= Only Yesterday (novel) =

Novel by Shmuel Yosef Agnon

- Cover of the English edition
- Author: Shmuel Yosef Agnon
- Translator: Barbara Harshav
- Language: Hebrew
- Publisher: Princeton University Press
- Publication date: 1945
- Publication place: Israel
- English publication date: 2000
- Pages: 704
- ISBN: 978-0691009728 (First English edition)

Only Yesterday (Hebrew: תמול שלשום, Tmol shilshom, lit. "yesterday and the day before that", meaning "not so long ago") is a 1945 Hebrew novel by the Israeli Nobel Prize laureate Shmuel Yosef Agnon, widely considered his masterpiece and one of the great works of modern Hebrew fiction. Through a blend of symbolism, intertextual allusions, and tragic comedy, it provides a nuanced perspective on the ideological and cultural tensions within the Jewish community in Palestine during the Second Aliyah period in the early 20th century.

== History and background ==
Shmuel Yosef Agnon is one of the central figures in modern Hebrew literature; he started writing in Hebrew at a time when it was "not yet the daily language of a modern society". He had immigrated to Palestine from Galicia in 1908 at age 20, part of the Second Aliyah wave of Jewish immigration motivated by the socialist Zionism movement. Much of the material in the novel is semi-autobiographical, drawing on Agnon's experiences of aliyah, and his life in Jaffa and Jerusalem. Tha writing process of the novel lasted almost 15 years, from 1931 to 1945, during World War II and the Holocaust. It was published in Palestine, and the book became "a sensation".

Only Yesterday is often called a masterpiece, and even "the Great Israeli Novel". The novel is sometimes categorized as "documentary fiction", and was called an "authoritative account of the Second Aliyah".

== Plot summary ==
Like all our brethren of the Second Aliyah, the bearers of our Salvation, Yitshak Kumer left his country and his homeland and his city and ascended to the Land of Israel to build it from its destruction and to be rebuilt by it.

— The opening line of the novel.

The main protagonist is Isaac Kumer (or Yitzhak Kumer), a Galician Jew who immigrates to Palestine around 1907 filled with idealism about building a new life working the land as part of the Zionist project. However, Isaac's initial dreams and illusions are gradually undermined by the harsh realities and cultural divides he encounters. In Jaffa, Isaac finds himself unable to get work on the agricultural settlements due to his lack of experience and labor scarcity, instead making a living as a house painter. He is exposed to the secular, cosmopolitan environment of Jaffa and the polemics between Labor Zionists and the religious old yishuv population in Jerusalem. Isaac develops a fateful relationship with the stray dog Balak; he writes the words "mad dog" (kelev meshugga) on its back, causing everyone who sees it to think that it has rabies, driving the plot in various ways. Isaac eventually marries the daughter of a religious family, suggesting an embrace of tradition over his earlier secular leanings. The book ends after Balak bites Isaac and he dies of rabies.

Isaac Kumer is sometimes compared with Don Quixote, and his name is read by some commenters as Yiddish/Hebrew "hybrid" that connects him to the binding of Isaac from Genesis 22. The Yiddish and German word "kumer" means '“grief,” “woe,” “misery,” or “sorrow”'. Balak is called one of the most recognizable animals in Jewish literature.

== Balak the 'Mad Dog' ==
What makes Balak so wonderful a creature is his total dogginess. He not only walks like a dog, runs like a dog, squats like a dog, sniffs like a dog, hungers like a dog, and thirsts like a dog, he also thinks like a dog or (so Agnon convinces us) thinks as a dog would think if a dog could think.

— Hillel Halkin

One of the most famous and analyzed elements of the novel is the stray dog named Balak who becomes an allegorical figure. Early in the story, the protagonist Isaac paints the words "mad dog" (kelev meshugga) in Hebrew on Balak's back. This act sets in motion a tragic chain of events where the dog is reviled, persecuted, beaten, and driven from place to place by people who believe he is rabid based on the writing on his back. The name, Balak, sounds like the Hebrew word for 'dog', kelev, spelled backwards. In the Bible, Book of Numbers 22:2–24:25, Balak was the King of Moab who urged Balaam to curse the Jews.

Balak's suffering mirrors the persecution of the Jewish people, but his role develops into a complex symbol over the course of the narrative, as his tale becomes increasingly intertwined with the experiences of Isaac and other human characters. Balak seems to represent the plight of the diaspora Jew, but also the alienation inherent in the condition of secular Jewish immigrants to Palestine. Interpretations have differed on whether Balak is solely a symbol of the Jewish outsider condition, or also represents aspects of Isaac's psyche. The role of Balak has been extensively analyzed through psychoanalytic lens.

Adam Kirsch called Balak's story "one of the great retellings of the Job story"; Hillel Halkin called Balak "a dog trapped by a Jewish fate." The Balak's appearance in the novel puzzled many critics, and one of the interpretations is that he is "representing a combination of Yitshak's sexual development, naivete, self-delusion, and larger psyche". Many more interpretations exist:

Reading Balak intertextually, Dan Miron counters by examining the dog as “a canine blend of Faust and Mephistopheles.” Looking not to Goethe but toward the book of Numbers, Ilana Pardes has recently reread the Balak narrative as an ironic commentary on the excesses of Zionist biblical exegesis. From a postcolonial perspective, Uri Cohen suggests that Balak is the inscription of imperialist violence evidenced in the text. Anne Golomb-Hoffman has also analyzed the story of Balak as an allegory of a “text cut loose”; in Todd Hasak-Lowy’s parallel estimation, it is an allegory of the eruptive potential of vernacular Hebrew.

Rabies in the novel can be both historical (in the 1930s there were hundreds cases of rabies in Tel Aviv) and symbolic, as argued by Sunny S. Yudkoff.

== Agnon's language and English translation ==
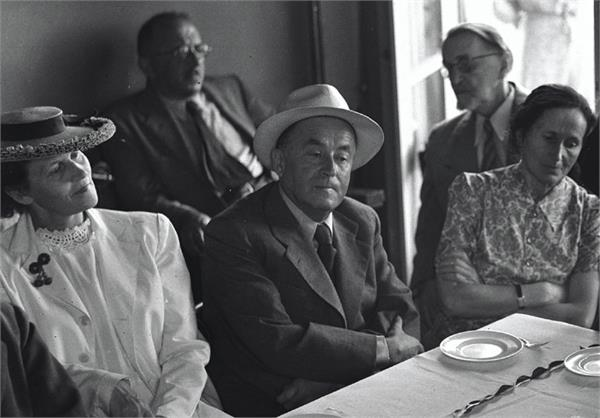
Agnon receiving the Ussishkin Prize in 1946

Agnon is often called "a notoriously difficult writer", his language is very different from modern Hebrew, and is described by Israelis now as "archaic":

Agnon was a linguistic pioneer who pitched his modern Hebrew prose on an ancient foundation. His language stretches back to biblical times and weaves in almost everything that came after, from Mishnaic and Talmudic and liturgical elements to modern Hebrew poems and Zionist slogans.

The first English translation of Only Yesterday was made in 2000 by Barbara Harshav, and published by Princeton University Press. The translation efforts were described as "the impossible task of wrestling Agnon into English" and "heroic efforts". The book also contains a glossary and "an excellent introduction" by Israeli poet and translator Benjamin Harshav, who is also Barbara Harshav's husband.

== Adaptations ==
Agnon collaborated with the artist Avigdor Arikha, who illustrated parts of the book published as "Stray Dog" (Kelev Hutzot). Amos Oz has "an episode-by-episode discussion of Only Yesterday" in his book The Silence of Heaven.
