= Iosif Begun =

Refusenik advocate and educator

Iosif Ziselovich Begun, sometimes spelled Yosef (born 9 July 1932, Russian: Иосиф Зиселевич Бегун, Hebrew: יוסף ביגון) is a former Soviet refusenik, prisoner of conscience, human rights activist, author and translator. Over the course of 17 years, Begun was imprisoned three times and spent over eight years in prisons and labor camps as a political prisoner. He was pardoned and freed in 1987 after political pressure from Jewish political organizations and the U.S. Government.

== Biography ==
Begun was born and grew up in Moscow, Soviet Union. He graduated from the radio technology department of the Moscow Power Engineering Institute, in 1957, and the department of mathematics at Moscow State University (the extension school), in 1962. He received a Candidate of Technical Sciences degree and worked as an electronics engineer and a statistician.

From 1971 to 1988, Begun was repeatedly arrested for his political activities. He was dismissed from his job as an engineer in 1971 after having submitted an application to emigrate. After that he began teaching Hebrew, but since this was not regarded as useful work, he was arrested on charges of social parasitism, and sent into exile in Siberia. One of his early arrests, in 1972, was during a 10-day Moscow visit by President Richard Nixon. After his first two labor camp terms, he was forced to live beyond the 101st kilometre from Moscow, in Strunino Village, Vladimir Oblast. He advocated for the free emigration of Soviet Jews to Israel. In 1982, he received a seven-year sentence for "anti-Soviet agitation and propaganda." His actual crime was writing descriptions of the situation of Soviet Jews that the authorities deemed to be anti-Soviet. His struggles led to wide protests in the West, by NCSJ and other Jewish organizations, and to U.S. diplomatic protestations. In the coverage of his case by various media outlets, he was described as a Jewish activist, or, in one instance, as a "leader of the Jewish emigration movement."

In February 1987 refusenik protests against Begun's continuing imprisonment took place on Arbat Street in downtown Moscow. The protesters, among them Begun's son Boris Begun, Begun's wife Inessa Begun, veteran refusenik Emilia Shrayer and other refuseniks, were attacked and beaten by KGB agents in plain sight of onlookers and foreign journalists. Following the refusenik protests, Begun's release from prison was announced on 16 February 1987 by Georgy Arbatov, a member of the Central Committee, in a Face the Nation interview on CBS.

In January 1988, a year after he was freed, Begun and his family were permitted to immigrate to Israel. In May 1988, President Ronald Reagan invited and honored Iosif Begun at the White House.

Begun's arrest, trial and imprisonment were followed and recorded by Amnesty International. He was fully rehabilitated in 1992, and got back his Russian citizenship in 2001. Haifa University awarded Begun an honorary doctorate "in recognition of his continued struggle to make Aliyah."

Begun settled in Jerusalem, and as of 2010 was running a small publishing house specializing in the translation of Jewish books into Russian.

== Legacy ==
- President Reagan kept a silver “Prisoner Of Zion” bracelet, engraved with the name “Yosef Begun” on his desk in the White House. Reagan later gave the bracelet to Begun at their 1988 White House meeting.
- He was one of the two Jews mentioned by Elie Wiesel in his Nobel Peace Prize acceptance speech, the other being Ida Nudel.
- Begun is the subject of short documentary "Iosef Begun - Human Rights Limited", made in 1980s.
- Begun is a subject of a documentary film "Refusenik", directed by Laura Bialis.
- Begun is a subject of the film "Through Struggle You Will Gain Your Rights".
- Begun is the subject of a long Russian-language poem, "Runner Begoon" (1987), by the author and former refusenik David Shrayer-Petrov. An English translation by Maxim D. Shrayer is available in print.

== See also ==
- Yuli-Yoel Edelstein
- Ida Nudel
- Natan Sharansky
- David Shrayer-Petrov
