= Iftach Alony =

Israeli writer, poet and architect

- יפתח אלוני
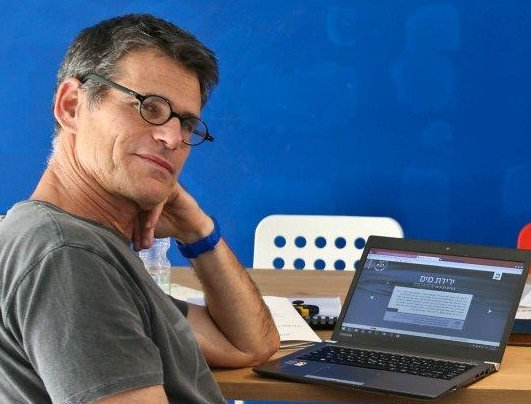
- Iftach Alony
- Born: September 15, 1955; Kibbutz Gvulot, Israel
- Education: Technion – Israel Institute of Technology, Polytechnic University of Catalonia
- Occupations: Writer, poet, architect
- Known for: Founder and chief editor of The Short Story Project, co-editor of Afik – Israeli Literature

Iftach Alony (Hebrew: יפתח אלוני; born 15 September 1955) is an Israeli writer, poet, and architect; he is the founder and chief editor of The Short Story Project, and the founder and co-editor of Afik – Israeli Literature.

== Biography ==
=== Early life ===
Alony was born and raised on Kibbutz Gvulot, located in the northwestern Negev desert. His parents, Shimon and Shoshana, were among the kibbutz founders. His father arrived in Israel at the age of seventeen on the Kastner train. His mother, Shoshana, was born on Moshav Givat Hen, near Ra'anana; her father, Israel, had been a member of the group of vegan pioneers who tried to settle Mount Kinneret and later deserted the area.

In 1960, the future of Kibbutz Gvulot was in jeopardy following the departure of most of its members. Along with a few others, Alony's parents stayed; Alony was one of a handful of children who remained on the kibbutz. The years of communal sleeping in the children's house, the constant search for social and academic frameworks in the nearby kibbutzim, and loneliness left their mark on him.

=== Architecture and Construction ===
Alony earned his bachelor's degree in architecture and urban planning from the Technion – Israel Institute of Technology and his master's in urbanism and interdisciplinary studies from the Polytechnic University of Catalonia's Institute for Advanced Architecture (thesis: Nomad Trajectories). At the end of his fourth year at the Technion, Alony won a competition for planning the community settlement Mitzpe Aviv, along with architect Tony Barter.

A partner at the architecture firm “I-Alony – D.Drori,” he has designed such projects as the master plan for the development of the western Negev (competition winner); Derech HaBesor, including the suspension bridge above HaBesor Stream; The Kiryat Malakhi Elderly Day Care Center (competition winner); the design of the Tzukim community settlement in the Arava area; the expansion of kibbutzim and moshavim; the planning of residential neighborhoods and commercial areas in Budapest, and commercial centers in Serbia.

=== Television and Art ===
During his years as an architect, Alony also devised and produced various cultural projects, including: "Story from the Movies" (six Israeli dramas based on Israeli fiction), in collaboration with The New Fund for Cinema and TV, which was aired on Channel 2, Telad Network; he served as executive producer of the film "To Each His Everest," following a group of people with special needs to the Everest Base Camp. He also produced various travel films broadcast on channel 2, including: “Kailash,” about a journey to the mountain holy to Hinduism and Buddhism, which included a personal meeting and extended interview with the Dalai Lama in Dharamshala, an interview that deeply influenced Alony later in life; the series "The Seven Peaks", which followed the journey of mountain climber Doron Erel to the highest mountain on every continent; he was also the executive producer of the film "Monks in the Desert – Spiritual Warriors", screened at the Amsterdam International Documentary Film Festival. Iftach Alony also initiated and participated in various delegations, which included accompanying hunters of the Inuit tribe to the Baffin Island in the Canadian Arctic Archipelago, and journeys to the Libyan Desert, the regions of the Caucasus (where he climbed Mount Elbrus), India, Nepal, and Tibet.

In 2005, Alony founded "Block—City/Media/Theory/Architecture", a multidisciplinary urban magazine. Alony was the magazine's co-editor-in-chief. The magazine was distributed by Keter Publishing House and supported by the Mifal HaPayis Council for the Culture and Arts.

The magazine's wide range of activities included organizing symposia on urban-cultural topics, participating in the first Bat-Yam Biennale of Landscape Urbanism (bus stations as living spaces), curating the exhibition "Insomnia" in the Petach-Tikva Museum of Art, and participating in the exhibition “Temporary Cities” in Barcelona.

In 2005, Alony participated in the group exhibition "Communal Sleeping," curated by Tali Tamir at the Helena Rubinstein Pavilion of the Tel Aviv Museum of Art. The exhibition provided a critical view of the communal sleeping practices in the children's houses of the kibbutz. Antony's work, "A Lexicon of Communal Words", exhibited index cards with words representing basic concepts of life on a kibbutz projected on a screen.

=== Literature ===
In 2009, Alony published his first novel, "Thief of Dreams" (Yediot Ahronoth and Sifrei Hemed), edited by Anat Levit.

In 2012, Alony co-founded "Afik Publishing House of Israeli Literature" with Professor Dan Miron and Lily Perry. The same year, his second book, "Spare Parts", was published and became a best-seller. As of September 2024, 270 titles have been published in Afik.

His first book of poems, "Let the Thorns Die," edited by Professor Dan Miron, was published in 2013. In 2014, he published his second book of poems, "Gravity," edited by Dror Burstein. Both books were published by Afik, and Alony's poems were published in various newspapers.

In 2015, Alony's collection of short stories, "Garuda’s Gaze," edited by Nurit Zarchi and Professor Dan Miron,

Alony's story collection, "Plagues Now," was published in 2016. It presents different interpretations of the Ten Plagues. A review by Uri Hollander appeared in Haaretz newspaper.

In 2014, Alony established "Maaboret—The Short Story Project," an online project that curates and publishes short stories from across the world; the stories appear in their original language (3000 stories from more than 50 states in 40 languages), and are also translated into English, Spanish, German, Arabic, and Hebrew, both in text and audio. Each story is uniquely displayed with video images. The project allows free access and is adaptable to any digital device. The project is supported by Mifal HaPayis Council for the Culture and Arts, the Goethe-Institut, and private agencies. There are 200,000 entries per month.

Alony's short fiction and poems have been published in various periodicals, including: Haaretz Gallery edition as well as in Haaretz Culture and Books Magazine, Yedioth Ahronoth Weekend edition, Granta 05 ("El Cavallo"), and in the anthologies “The Only Band that Matters” (published by Akik, 2015, editor: Dana Kessler; story: "xxx"), "We Don’t Forget, We Go Dancing" (published by Afik; 2015, editors: Norbert Kron and Amichai Shalev; story: "Saragossa in Berlin").

In 2014, Alony served as a judge in Haaretz's short story competition.

As part of the Short Story Project, Alony created the literary production "Listen to This", an ensemble of four actors (Menashe Noy, Alma Dishi, Or Rotem, Matan Ksirer) reading short stories from the project, accompanied by a pianist and a percussionist; Tzavta Theater staged the production.

In 2014 and 2017, Alony participated in the Metula Poetry Festival.

In 2024, he was awarded the Prime Minister's Prize for Hebrew Literary Works.

=== Personal life ===
Alony is the father of four, and lives with his partner.

== About his Books ==
- "Thief of Dreams" (Yediot Ahronoth - Sifrei Hemed, 2009)

A collage of monologues and conversations by nine characters; Tevet, the protagonist, fashions masks from the memories he steals from other people, turning them into his own.

- "Spare Parts" (Afik, 2012)

Matan Kol is an orphan. His parents, former circus performers, were killed in a tightrope accident (suspected suicide). He was raised by Eva, his maternal aunt, a bachelorette from Tel Aviv, and spent summer vacations with his grandmother, Leah, still mourning over her daughter. After his first love, Sima, breaks up with him, he moves to New York, where his career as a neurosurgeon takes off. Twenty years later, he returns to Israel, settling in Sde Boker and working at Soroka Medical Center. Despite being surrounded by women all his life, Matan suffers from anxiety and cannot enter into an intimate relationship.
The book opens with Matan choosing to let a patient die during brain surgery, despite the different choice at his disposal – performing split-brain surgery. The narrative goes back in time when the patient, Nadine, arrives in Israel to interview Matan for a profile piece.

The book reached third place on Steimatzky’s best-seller list.

- "Lost" (Afik, 2021)

Aloni's physical and spiritual journeys in the world: soul searching meeting in Dharamshala with the Dalai Lama, a desert journey with the author Nurit Zarchi, conversation with the archi-spy Rafi Eitan, looking for the god Anubis with a Bedouin and intimidating meeting with the African dictator Omar Bongo.

== Works ==
Poetry

- "Let the Thorns Die" (Afik, 2013); edited by Professor Dan Miron
- "Gravity", a selection of poems and flash fiction (Afik, 2014); edited by Dror Burstein

Fiction

- "Thief of Dreams" (Yediot Ahronoth - Sifrei Hemed, 2009); editor: Anat Levit
- "Spare Parts" (Afik, 2012); editor: Lily Perry
- "Garuda’s Gaze" (Afik, 2015); editor: Nurit Zarchi
- "Plagues Now" (Afik, 2016); editor: Nurit Zarchi
- "Titanic in the Sands" (Afik, 2018); editor: Nurit Zarchi
- "Lost" (Afik, 2021); editor: Yahil Zaban
- "The book of Running" (Afik, 2024)
