= Shmuel Yosef Agnon =

Israeli writer and Nobel laureate

- שמואל יוסף עגנון
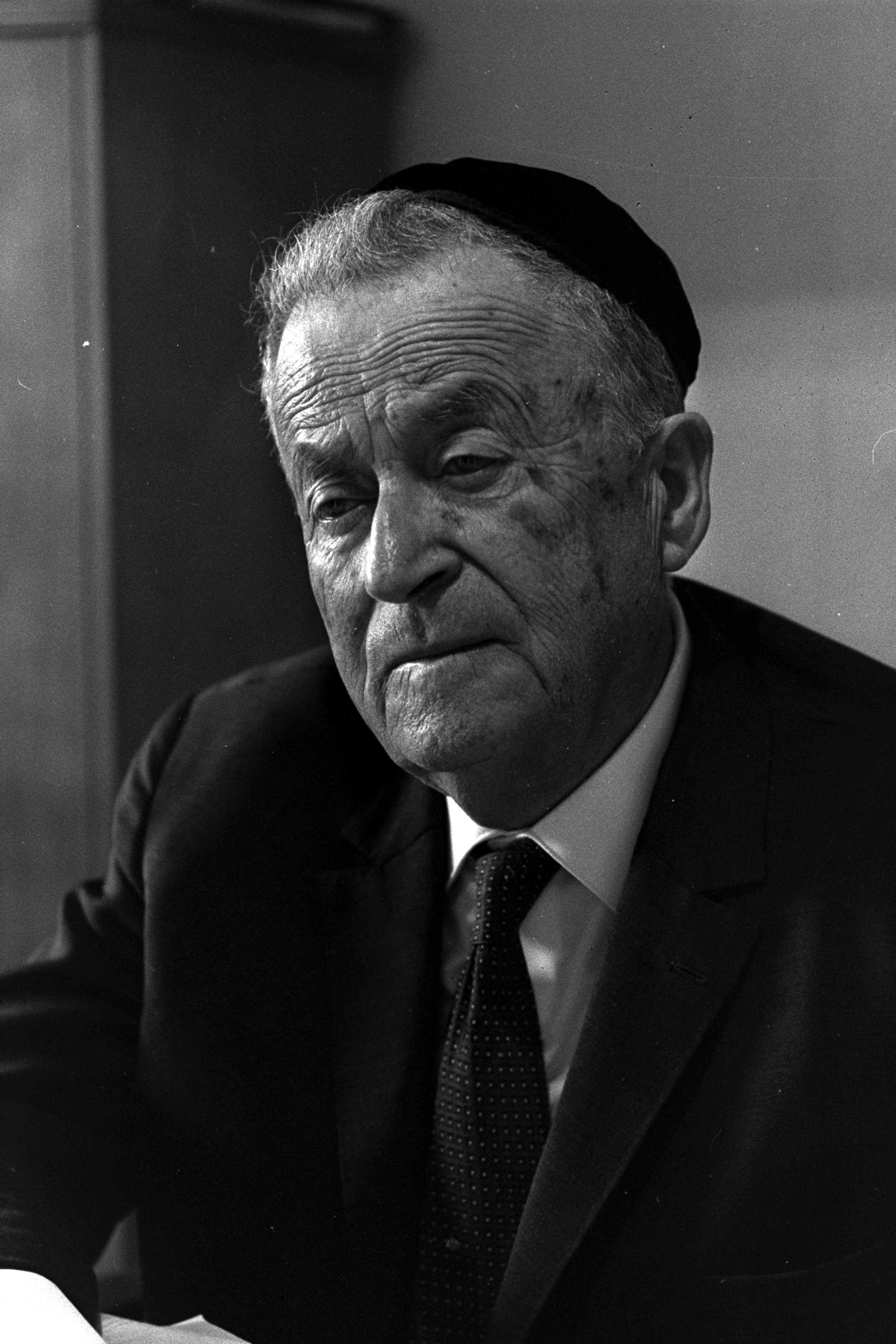
- Agnon in 1966
- Born: Shmuel Yosef Halevi Czaczkes; August 8, 1887; Buczacz, Austrian Galicia, Austria-Hungary (now Buchach, Ukraine)
- Died: February 17, 1970 (aged 82); Jerusalem
- Resting place: Mount of Olives Jewish Cemetery
- Occupations: Novelist, poet, short-story writer
- Spouse: Esther Marx
- Writing career
- Pen name: S. Y. Agnon ש"י עגנון
- Language: Hebrew
- Genre: Novels
- Notable awards: Nobel Prize in Literature; 1966

Shmuel Yosef Agnon (Hebrew: שמואל יוסף עגנון \ שְׁמוּאֵל יוֹסֵף עַגְנוֹן shmuél yoséf agnón; August 8, 1887 – February 17, 1970) was an Austro-Hungarian-born Israeli novelist, poet, and short-story writer. He was one of the central figures of modern Hebrew literature. In Hebrew, he is known by the nom de plume Shai Agnon (Hebrew: ש״י עגנון \ שַׁ״י עַגְנוֹן sháy agnón). In English, his works are published under the name S. Y. Agnon.

Agnon was born in Eastern Galicia, then part of the Austro-Hungarian Empire, and later immigrated to Mandatory Palestine, and died in Jerusalem.

His works deal with the conflict between the traditional Jewish life and language and the modern world. They also attempt to recapture the fading traditions of the European shtetl 'small town' (cf. Yiddish: שטאָט shtot 'town, city', שטעטל shtetl 'little town', דאָרף dorf 'village'). In a wider context, he also contributed to broadening the characteristic conception of the narrator's role in literature. Agnon had a distinctive linguistic style, mixing modern and rabbinic Hebrew.

In 1966, he shared the Nobel Prize in Literature with the poet Nelly Sachs.

== Biography ==
=== Early life in Galicia ===
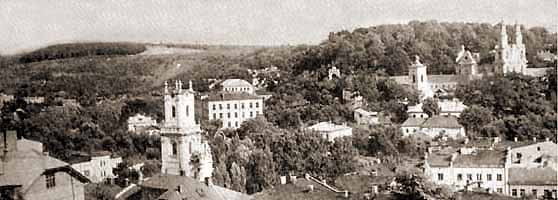
Buczacz, Agnon's hometown

Shmuel Yosef Halevi Czaczkes was born in Buczacz (German: Butschatsch), a small town in Eastern Galicia, then part of the Austro-Hungarian Empire and now Buchach, Ukraine. He was born in the summer of 1887, but in later life gave his birthday as the fast of Tisha B'Av in 1888, a date he seems to have adopted first to avoid military service and kept afterwards for its symbolism. (Note: He was born on 18 Av 5647, which corresponds to 8 August 1887. The date he later used, Tisha B'Av 5648, fell on 17 July 1888; it appears in his Nobel Prize biography and in many reference works. Arnold Band writes that Agnon invented the 1888 date in the 1920s.)

He was the eldest of five children in a traditional, middle-class family.

His father was a Hasid, while his maternal grandfather, Yehuda Farb, belonged to the Misnagdim, the movement opposed to Hasidism. Agnon entered cheder at three and left it about six years later; from then on he was taught privately, by tutors and by his father, with whom he studied the Talmud and Maimonides. Alongside rabbinic and Hasidic learning, the household was open to European culture, and as a youth he read widely in the literature of the Galician maskilim.

He began writing as a boy and, from 1903, published poems and stories in Hebrew and Yiddish in Galician periodicals. By the time he left Buczacz he had published some seventy pieces, occasionally under his own name but more often under pseudonyms. He left his hometown for good at the age of twenty.

=== Jaffa (1908–1912) ===
Drawn to Zionism, and facing possible conscription into the Austro-Hungarian army, Agnon set out for Palestine in 1908. Travelling by way of Lwów, Kraków and Vienna, he reached Jaffa at the beginning of June, during the Second Aliyah. He settled in Neve Tzedek, gave up religious observance, and soon became part of the small Hebrew literary circle then taking shape in Palestine.

His first story published there, "Agunot" ("Abandoned Wives"), an account of a failed marriage set in Jerusalem, appeared in the journal Ha-Omer in October 1908. He signed it "Agnon", a pen name drawn from the story's title that later became his legal surname. At Agnon's request, Martin Buber published a German translation of the story in the Zionist weekly Die Welt in 1910. In 1909 he met Hayim Nahman Bialik during the poet's visit to Palestine. The story won him recognition as a serious writer, above all from Yosef Haim Brenner, and a warm welcome among the intellectual leadership of the Yishuv. Some of his Jaffa stories reflected his new surroundings, such as "Tishre" (1911), later reworked as "The Sand Hill"; others went back to the Galician world he had left behind.

The most important work of these years was the novella Vehaya he-akov lemishor ("And the Crooked Shall Be Made Straight", 1912). Based on a Hasidic tale and set in and around Buczacz, it is dense with allusions to classical Jewish texts, a technique that became a hallmark of his writing. Brenner, at the time far better known than Agnon, paid for its publication as a book, reportedly by selling a pair of suspenders.

In Jaffa Agnon gave Hebrew lessons to the Zionist settlement official Arthur Ruppin and his wife, and the two men became friends. In October 1912, probably with Ruppin's encouragement, he left Jaffa in Ruppin's company, bound for Berlin.

=== Germany (1912–1924) ===
Agnon had planned a short stay in Germany but remained there for twelve years. The outbreak of the First World War in 1914 cut off any return to Palestine, and after the war he stayed for personal reasons. He lived in Berlin until early 1917 and spent long periods during the rest of the war in Leipzig, where his sister Rosa lived. Opposed to the war, he went to great lengths to avoid being drafted.

In Berlin he quickly became close to Buber, who already knew his work, and to the young German Zionists around him, among them Gershom Scholem. For this circle, which was rediscovering the Jewish culture its parents had turned away from, Agnon stood for the authentic tradition of Eastern European Jewry. Scholem called him "the Jews' Jew". Through these circles he met the businessman Salman Schocken, who became his patron and freed him from financial worries; in Laor's assessment, Schocken's support for Agnon had no parallel in twentieth-century Hebrew literature. Schocken also kept him supplied with books, and during these years Agnon read widely in European literature in German, from Flaubert and Dostoevsky to Goethe and Fontane.

Agnon's fiction of the German years dealt almost entirely with the Jewish world of Galicia and Poland, reworking pious legends, folklore and Hasidic tales. It included the long story "Ha-Nidah" ("The Outcast"), the cycle Polin, and the first version of Hakhnasat Kalla, serialized in 1920. And the Crooked Shall Be Made Straight appeared in German in 1918, in a translation by Max Strauss, and was reprinted three times within five years; Buber's monthly Der Jude became the main outlet for his stories in German, some of them translated by Scholem. In Hebrew, the Jüdischer Verlag in Berlin issued a new edition of the novella in 1919 with woodcuts by Joseph Budko, followed by the collections Be-sod yesharim (1921) and Al kapot ha-man'ul (1923). It was in Germany that he began his lifelong habit of revising and rewriting stories that had already been published. He also worked with Buber on a large anthology of Hasidic literature.

After a year in Munich, where his relationship with Esther Marx (1889–1973) of Königsberg deepened, Agnon returned to Berlin and married her in 1920. She was the sister of the scholar Alexander Marx. The couple, who had two children in the following two years, lived first in Wiesbaden and then for more than three years in Bad Homburg. Between 1921 and 1925 the spa town became a small centre of Hebrew literary life, where Agnon's circle included Bialik and Ahad Ha'am.

On 6 June 1924 a fire broke out in the Agnons' house in Bad Homburg, destroying his library and all his manuscripts, among them a novel, Be-tsror ha-hayyim, whose publication had already been announced, and the first volume of the Hasidic anthology. The loss is echoed occasionally in his fiction. Agnon saw the fire as a punishment for his long stay in exile, and within three months he had left Germany.

=== Jerusalem (1924–1948) ===
In the autumn of 1924 Agnon settled in Jerusalem, this time for good. Having set aside religious practice in Jaffa and Germany, he had by then returned to a traditional observant life, which he maintained until his death. This religious traditionalism, which he cultivated in his life as well as in his writing, made him a singular figure in the largely secular literary world of the Yishuv.

The family made their home in the neighbourhood of Talpiot. During the 1929 Palestine riots the house was looted, and much of Agnon's library, including rare books and manuscripts, was destroyed. Agnon came to call the Bad Homburg fire and the 1929 looting his "two destructions", likening them to the destruction of the two Temples.

Schocken remained his patron. In 1928 he informed Agnon that he had decided to found a publishing house of his own to bring out Agnon's works. In 1930 Agnon spent half a year in Leipzig overseeing the printing, and on the same journey made a short visit to Buczacz. The collected stories appeared in four volumes in 1931. Besides stories published up to mid-1929, they included Hakhnasat Kalla, now expanded into a full-length novel; the collection was hailed as a landmark and established Agnon as one of the central figures of modern Hebrew literature.

Further volumes followed from Schocken: the novella Sippur Pashut ("A Simple Story", 1935), a realistic portrait of the Buczacz of his youth, and the story collection Be-shuva va-nahat (1935). At the suggestion of the firm's editor, Moshe Spitzer, he compiled Yamim Nora'im ("Days of Awe"), an anthology of traditions and legends for the High Holy Days. In the early 1930s he also began to publish the stories of Sefer ha-Ma'asim ("The Book of Deeds"), a series of surreal, dreamlike pieces that mark his turn towards modernism.

His two major novels of these years both grew out of his own experience. A Guest for the Night, serialized from October 1938 to April 1939 and published as a book in 1939, drew on his 1930 visit to Buczacz and follows a narrator who returns to his Galician hometown to find it desolate after the First World War. Only Yesterday (1945) returned to Palestine in the years of the Second Aliyah. The two books are generally regarded as his greatest achievements.

=== State of Israel (1948–1970) ===
After the establishment of the State of Israel, Agnon had a hand in the Prayer for the Welfare of the State of Israel (1948). For decades its authorship was disputed: Chief Rabbi Yitzhak HaLevi Herzog was generally credited until a 1983 article in Ma'ariv by the scholar David Tamar suggested that Agnon had written it. In 2018 research by Yoel Rappel, corroborated by the National Library of Israel, established that Herzog was the author and that Agnon had edited the text.

In 1951 Agnon was diagnosed with a heart condition; until then he had written standing at a lectern, and from then on he worked seated. He continued to write prolifically, publishing about six new stories a year in Haaretz. For some twenty-five years he also worked on the novel Shira, set among German-Jewish immigrants in 1930s Jerusalem, which he never completed. In the aftermath of the Holocaust he wrote the stories later collected in Ir u-melo'ah ("A City in Its Fullness"), a vast body of legends and chronicles devoted to Buczacz, whose Jewish community had been annihilated. In 1966 he shared the Nobel Prize in Literature with Nelly Sachs.

Agnon generally kept his distance from public life and rarely voiced political opinions. After the Six-Day War, however, he joined the Movement for Greater Israel, founded in 1967; according to Abramovich, his belief in the biblical Land of Israel grew out of his religious outlook rather than a political programme.

In his last years Agnon suffered a series of strokes that left him incapacitated. He died in Rehovot on 17 February 1970 and was buried on the Mount of Olives in Jerusalem.

Agnon was a strict vegetarian in his personal life.

During much of the 20th century, there was debate about whether Agnon or Yitzhak HaLevi Herzog was the actual author of the Prayer for the Welfare of the State of Israel in 1948. Herzog was generally considered the author until a 1983 article in Ma'ariv by scholar David Tamar raised the possibility of Agnon's authorship. However, findings by scholar Yoel Rappel and corroborated by the National Library of Israel in 2018 confirmed Herzog's authorship but confirmed that Agnon had edited the work.

== Literary themes and influences ==
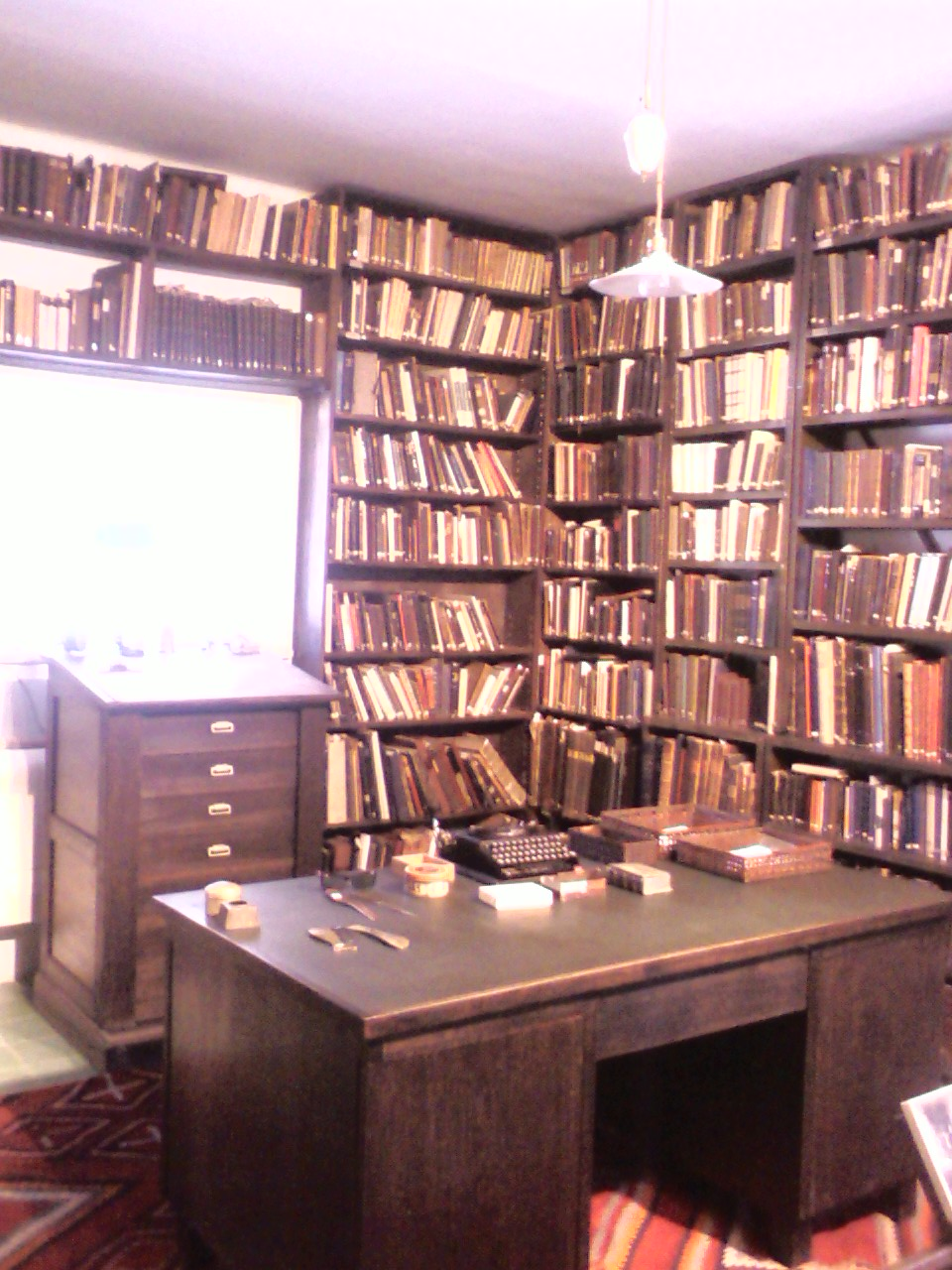
Agnon's study

Agnon's writing has been the subject of extensive academic research. Many leading scholars of Hebrew literature have published books and papers on his work, among them Baruch Kurzweil, Dov Sadan, Nitza Ben-Dov, Dan Miron, Dan Laor and Alan Mintz. Agnon writes about Jewish life, but with his own unique perspective and special touch. In his Nobel acceptance speech, Agnon claimed "Some see in my books the influences of authors whose names, in my ignorance, I have not even heard, while others see the influences of poets whose names I have heard but whose writings I have not read." He went on to detail that his primary influences were the stories of the Bible. Agnon acknowledged that he was also influenced by German literature and culture, and European literature in general, which he read in German translation. A collection of essays on this subject, edited in part by Hillel Weiss, with contributions from Israeli and German scholars, was published in 2010: Agnon and Germany: The Presence of the German World in the Writings of S.Y. Agnon. The budding Hebrew literature also influenced his works, notably that of his friend, Yosef Haim Brenner. In Germany, Agnon also spent time with the Hebraists Hayim Nahman Bialik and Ahad Ha'am.

The communities he passed through in his life are reflected in his works:

- Galicia: in the books The Bridal Canopy, A City and the Fullness Thereof, A Simple Story and A Guest for the Night.
- Germany: in the stories "Fernheim", "Thus Far" and "Between Two Cities".
- Jaffa: in the stories "Oath of Allegiance", "Tmol Shilshom" and "The Dune".
- Jerusalem: "Tehilla", "Tmol Shilshom", "Ido ve-Inam" and "Shira".

Nitza Ben-Dov writes about Agnon's use of allusiveness, free-association and imaginative dream-sequences, and discusses how seemingly inconsequential events and thoughts determine the lives of his characters.

Some of Agnon's works, such as The Bridal Canopy, And the Crooked Shall Be Made Straight, and The Doctor's Divorce, have been adapted for theatre. A play based on Agnon's letters to his wife, "Esterlein Yakirati", was performed at the Khan Theater in Jerusalem.

== Language ==
Agnon's writing often used words and phrases that differed from what would become established modern Hebrew. His distinct language is based on traditional Jewish sources, such as the Torah and the Prophets, Midrashic literature, the Mishnah, and other Rabbinic literature. Some examples include:

- batei yadayim (lit. 'hand-houses') for modern kfafot (כפפות)(gloves).
- yatzta (יצתה) rather than the modern conjugation yatz'a (יצאה) ("she went out").
- rotev (רוטב) meaning soup in place of modern marak (מרק). In Modern Hebrew the term 'rotev' means 'sauce'.
- bet kahava for modern bet kafe (coffee house / café), based on transliteration of the word 'coffee' from Arabic, rather than the contemporary term common in Hebrew, which comes from European languages.

Bar-Ilan University has made a computerized concordance of his works in order to study his language.

== Awards and critical acclaim ==
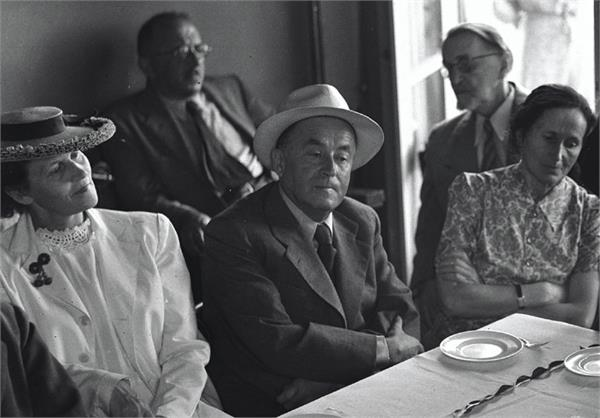
Agnon receiving the Ussishkin Prize 1946

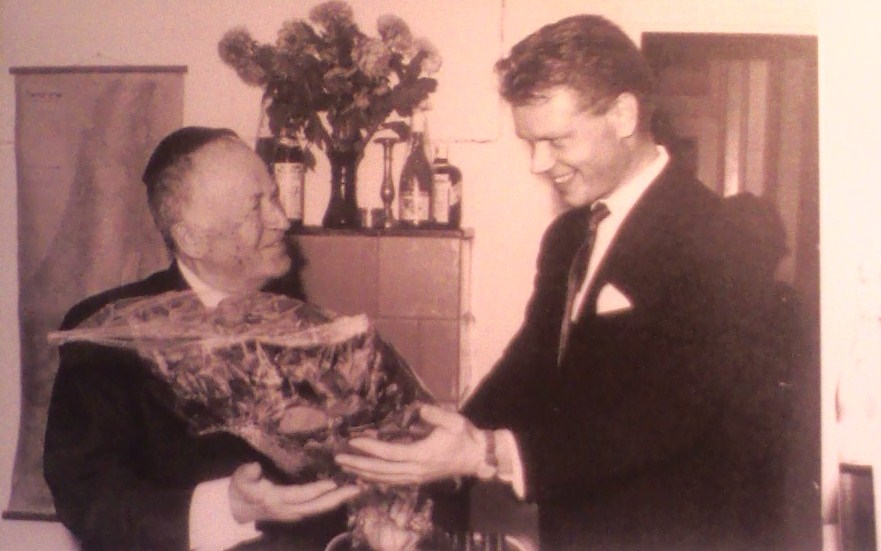
Agnon (left) receiving the Nobel Prize, 1966

Agnon was twice awarded the Bialik Prize for literature (1934 and 1950). He was also twice awarded the Israel Prize, for literature (1954 and 1958).

In 1966, he was awarded the Nobel Prize in Literature "for his profoundly characteristic narrative art with motifs from the life of the Jewish people". The prize was shared with German Jewish author Nelly Sachs. In his speech at the award ceremony, Agnon introduced himself in Hebrew: "As a result of the historic catastrophe in which Titus of Rome destroyed Jerusalem and Israel was exiled from its land, I was born in one of the cities of the Exile. But always I regarded myself as one who was born in Jerusalem". The award ceremony took place on a Saturday during the Jewish festival of Hanukkah. Agnon, who was religiously observant, postponed attendance at the awards ceremony until he had performed two Jewish ceremonies of his own on Saturday night, to end the Sabbath and to light the menorah.

In later years, Agnon's fame was such that when he complained to the municipality that traffic noise near his home was disturbing his work, the city closed the street to cars and posted a sign that read: "No entry to all vehicles, writer at work!"

== Death and legacy ==
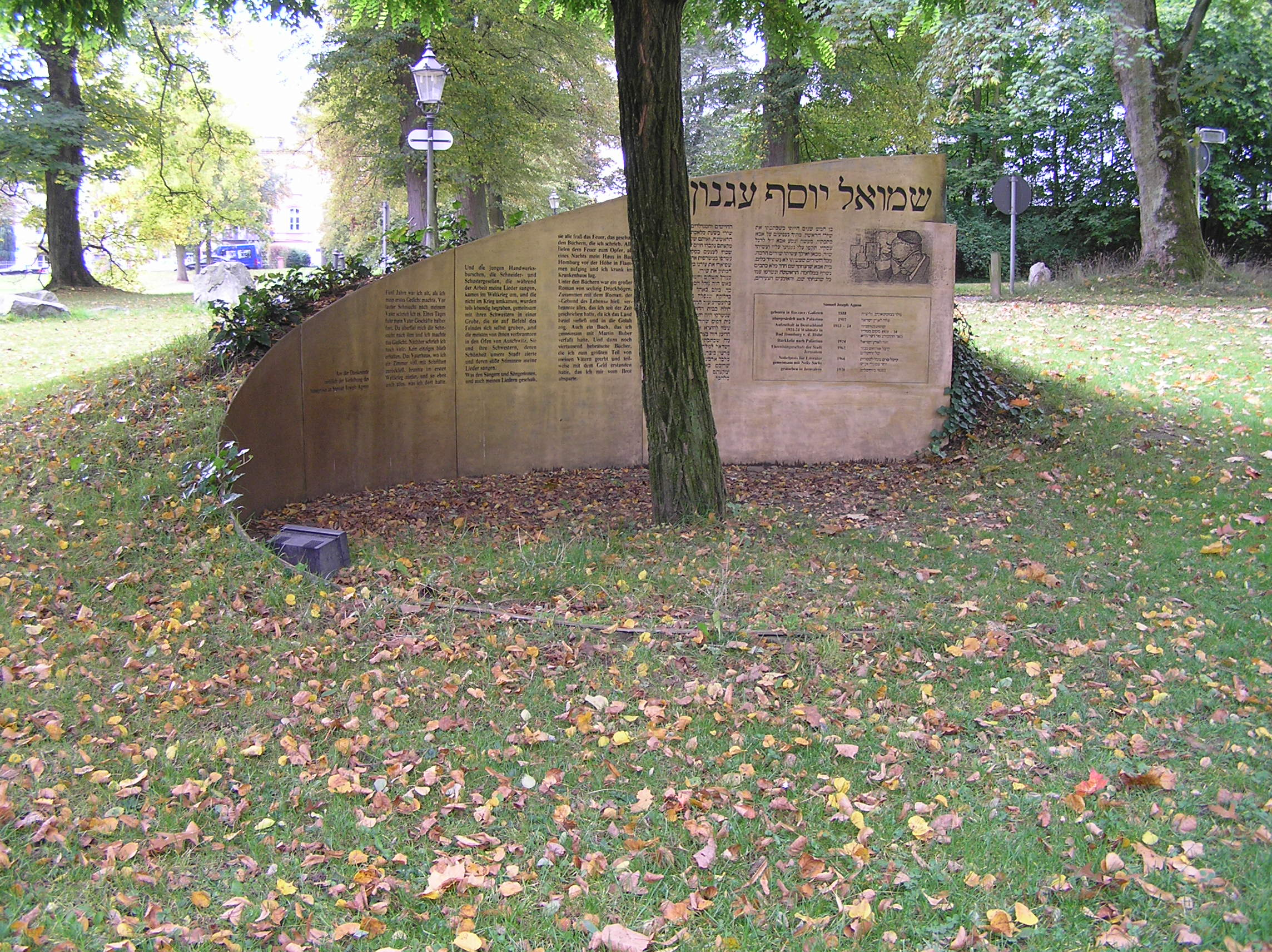
Shmuel Yosef Agnon Memorial in Bad Homburg, Germany

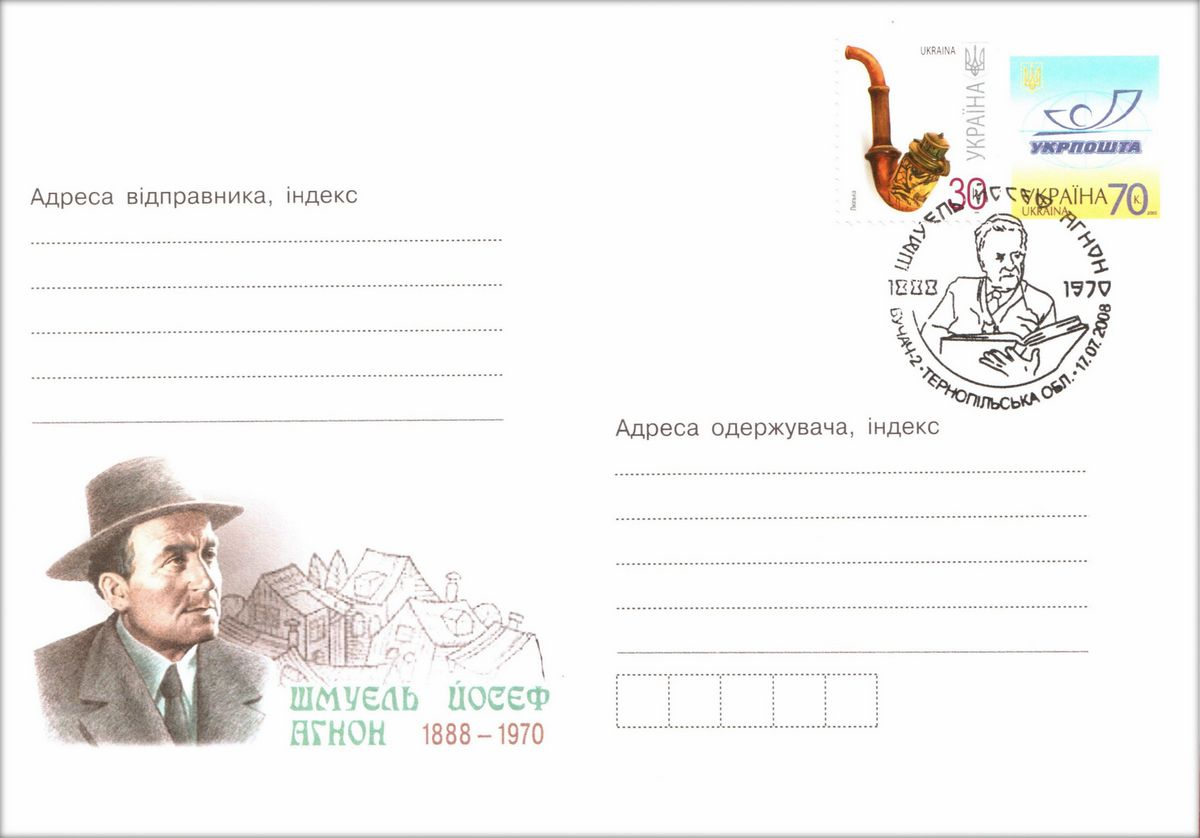
First day cover for Ukrainian commemorative stamp

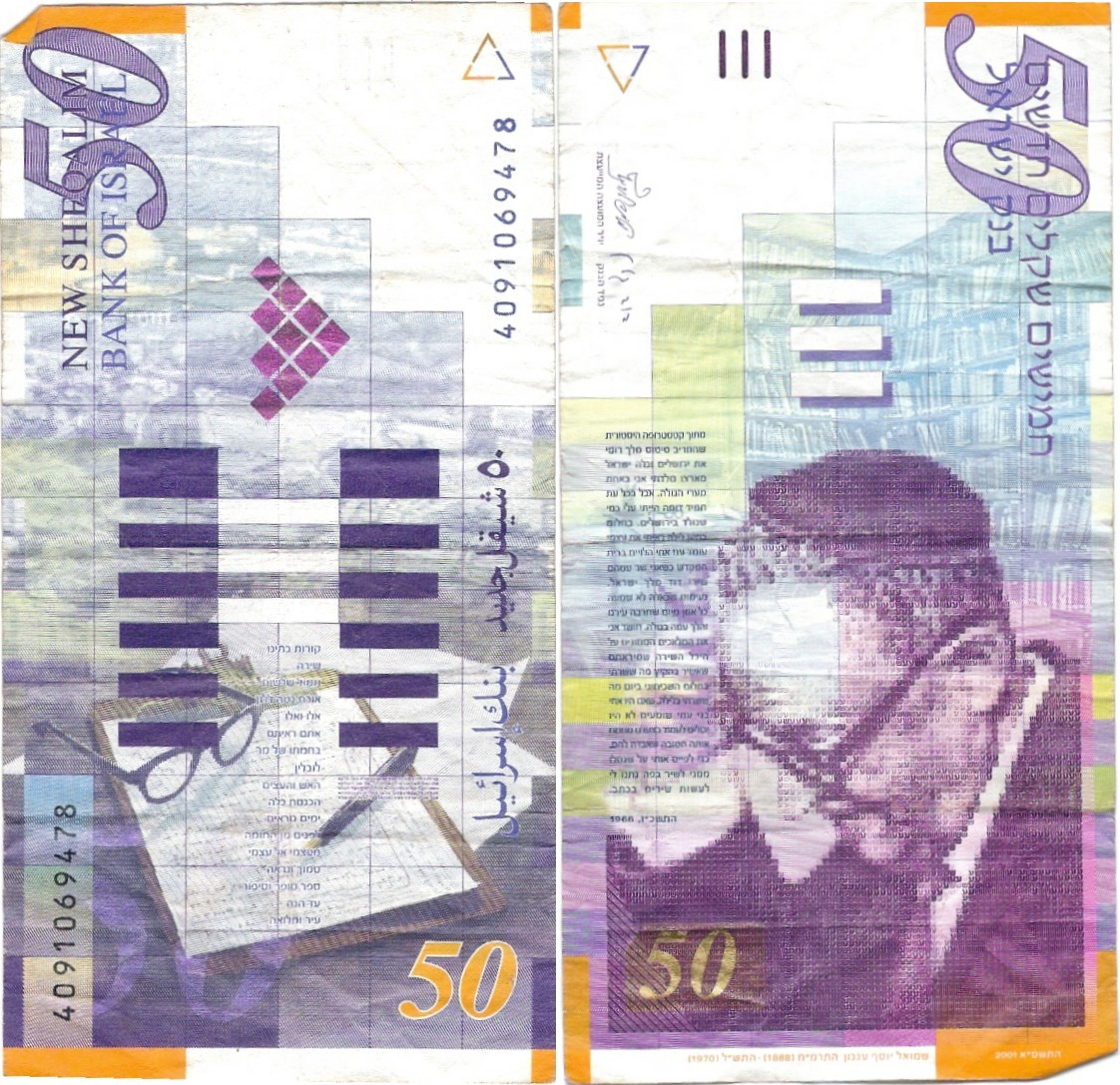
Agnon featured on the fifty-shekel bill, second series

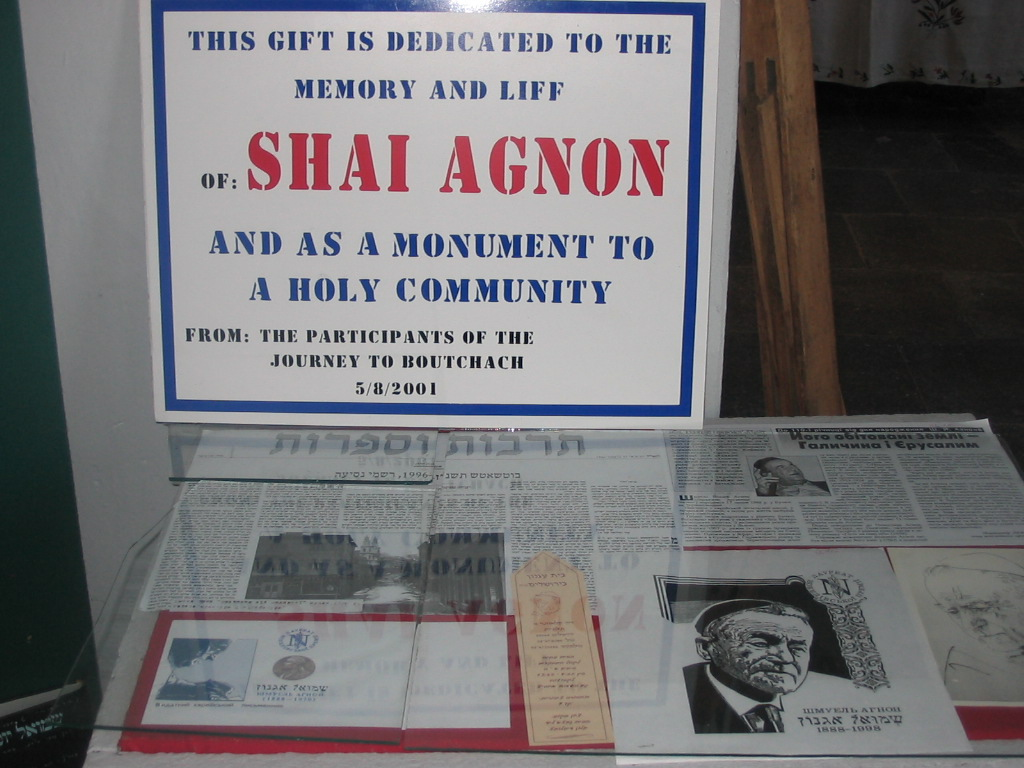
Exposition in Bouchach museum

Agnon died in Jerusalem on February 17, 1970. His daughter, Emuna Yaron, continued to publish his work posthumously. Agnon's archive was transferred by the family to the National Library in Jerusalem. His home in Talpiot, built in 1931 in the Bauhaus style, was turned into a museum, Beit Agnon. The study where he wrote many of his works was preserved intact. Agnon's image, with a list of his works and his Nobel Prize acceptance speech, appeared on the fifty-shekel bill, second series, in circulation from 1985 to 2014.

The main street in Jerusalem's Givat Oranim neighborhood is called Sderot Shai Agnon, and a synagogue in Talpiot, a few blocks from his home, is named after him. Agnon is also memorialized in Buchach (now in Ukraine). The Historical Museum in Buchach has an exhibit about him and a bust of the author is mounted on a pedestal in a plaza across the street from the house where he lived. The house itself is preserved and marked as the home where Agnon lived from birth till the age of (approximately) 19; the street that runs in front of the house is named "Agnon Street" (in Ukrainian).

Agnotherapy is a method developed in Israel to help elderly people express their feelings.

== Beit Agnon ==
After Agnon's death, the former mayor of Jerusalem Mordechai Ish-Shalom initiated the opening of his home to the public. In the early 1980s, the kitchen and family dining room were turned into a lecture and conference hall, and literary and cultural evenings were held there. In 2005, the Agnon House Association in Jerusalem renovated the building, which reopened in January 2009. The house was designed by the German-Jewish architect Fritz Korenberg, who was also his neighbor.

== Published works ==
=== Novels and novellas ===
- The Bridal Canopy (1931), translated from Hakhnāsat kallāh. An epic describing Galician Judaism at the start of the 19th century. The story of a poor but devout Galician Jew, Reb Yudel, who wanders the countryside with his companion, Nuta, during the early 19th century, in search of bridegrooms for his three daughters.
- In the Heart of the Seas, a story of a journey to the land of Israel (1933), translated from Bi-levav yamim. A short novel about a group of ten men who travel from Eastern Europe to Jerusalem.
- A Simple Story (1935), translated from Sipur pashut. A short novel about a young man, his search for a bride, and the lessons of marriage.
- A Guest for the Night (1938), translated from Ore'ah Noteh Lalun. A novel about the decline of eastern European Jewry. The narrator visits his old hometown and discovers that great changes have occurred since World War I.
- Betrothed (1943), translated from Shevuat Emunim. A short novel.
- Only Yesterday (1945), translated from Temol shilshom. An epic novel set in the Second Aliyah period. It follows the story of the narrator from Galicia to Jaffa to Jerusalem. Sometimes translated as Those Were The Days.
- Edo and Enam (1950). A short novel.
- To This Day (1952), translated from ʿAd henah. A tale of a young writer stranded in Berlin during World War I.
- Shira (1971). A novel set in Jerusalem in the 1930s and 1940s. Manfred Herbst, a middle-aged professor suffering from boredom, spends his days prowling the streets searching for Shira, the beguiling nurse he met when his wife was giving birth to their third child. Against the background of 1930s Jerusalem, Herbst wages war against the encroachment of age.

=== Short stories ===
- Of Such and Of Such, a collection of stories, including "And the Crooked Shall Be Made Straight", "Forsaken Wives", and "Belevav Yamim" ("In the Heart of the Seas") from 1933.
- At the Handles of the Lock (1923), a collection of love stories, including "Bidmay Yameha" ("In the Prime of Her Life"), "A Simple Story", and "The Dune".
- Near and Apparent, a collection of stories, including "The Two Sages Who Were In Our City", "Between Two Cities", "The Lady and the Peddler", the collection "The Book of Deeds", the satire "Chapters of the National Manual", and "Introduction to the Kaddish: After the Funerals of Those Murdered in the Land of Israel".
- Thus Far, a collection of stories, including "Thus Far", "Prayer", "Oath of Allegiance", "The Garment", "Fernheim", and "Ido ve-Inam" (Edo and Enam).
- The Fire and the Wood, a collection of stories including Hasidic tales, a semi-fictional account of Agnon's family history and other stories.
- Tale of the Goat

=== English translations ===
- "Forever (Ad Olam)", Translated and commentary by Yehuda Salu, CreateSpace, 2014.
- A Simple Story, revised edition, translated by Hillel Halkin, The Toby Press, 2014.
- Shira, revised edition of Agnon's final novel, The Toby Press, 2014
- Two Tales: Betrothed & Edo and Enam, contains two short novellas.
- Twenty-One Stories, a collection of translated stories from "The Book of Deeds" and elsewhere.
- Israeli Stories, ed. Joel Blocker. Contains the stories "Tehilah" (1950) and "Forevermore" (1954).
- New Writing in Israel, ed. Ezra Spicehandler and Curtis Arnson. Contains the story "Wartime in Leipzig", an excerpt from "In Mr. Lublin's Store".
- A Dwelling Place of My People, contains 16 short stories about the Hassidim of Poland, from the Hebrew volume "These and Those" (1932).
- Jaffa, belle of the seas: Selections from the works of S.Y. Agnon
- Tehilah, Israel Argosy, trans. by Walter Lever, Jerusalem Post Press, Jerusalem, 1956

=== Anthologies ===
- Days of Awe (1938), a book of customs, interpretations, and legends for the Jewish days of mercy and forgiveness: Rosh Hashanah, Yom Kippur, and the days between.
- Present at Sinai: The Giving of the Law (1959), an anthology for the festival of Shavuot.

=== Posthumous publications ===
- Ir Umeloah ("A City and the Fullness Thereof") (1973), a collection of stories and legends about Buczacz, Agnon's hometown.
- In Mr. Lublin's Store (1974), set in Germany of the First World War.
- Within the Wall (1975), a collection of four stories.
- From Myself to Myself (1976), a collection of essays and speeches.
- Introductions (1977), stories.
- Book, Writer and Story (1978), stories about writers and books from the Jewish sources.
- The Beams of Our House (1979), two stories, the first about a Jewish family in Galicia, the second about the history of Agnon's family.
- Esterlein Yakirati ("Dear Esther: Letters 1924–1931" (1983), letters from Agnon to his wife.
- A Shroud of Stories (1985).
- The Correspondence between S.Y. Agnon and S. Schocken (1991), letters between Agnon and his publisher.
- Agnon's Alef Bet Poems (1998), a children's guide to the Hebrew alphabet.
- A Book That Was Lost: Thirty Five Stories (2008)

In 1977 the Hebrew University published Yiddish Works, a collection of stories and poems that Agnon wrote in Yiddish during 1903–1906.

== See also ==
- List of Jewish Nobel laureates

== Bibliography ==
- Arnold J. Band, Nostalgia and nightmare : a study in the fiction of S.Y. Agnon, Berkeley and Los Angeles : University of California Press, 1968.
- Nitza Ben-Dov, Agnon's art of indirection: Uncovering latent content in the fiction of S.Y Agnon, Brill, (Leiden). 1993. ISBN 90-04-09863-1.
- Gershon Shaked, Shmuel Yosef Agnon: A Revolutionary Traditionalist. New York University Press, 1989.
- Anne Golomb Hoffman, Between Exile and Return: S.Y. Agnon and the Drama of Writing, New York: SUNY, 1991. ISBN 0-7914-0541-9.
- Amos Oz, The Silence of Heaven: Agnon's Fear of God, Princeton University Press, 2000.
- Roman Katsman, Literature, History, Choice: The Principle of Alternative History in Literature (S.Y. Agnon, The City with All That is Therein). Newcastle: Cambridge Scholars Publishing, 2013.
- Abramson, Glenda (2008). Hebrew Writing of the First World War. Valentine Mitchell. ISBN 9780853037712.
- Yaniv Hagbi, Language, Absence, Play: Judaism and Superstructuralism in the Poetics of S. Y. Agnon, Syracuse: Syracuse University Press, 2009.
- Ilana Pardes, Agnon's Moonstruck Lovers: The Song of Songs in Israeli Culture, Seattle: University of Washington Press, 2013.
- Ahuva Feldman, "Consciousness of time and mission in S. Y. Agnon's Shira. Hebrew Studies 50 (2009) 339-381.
- Marc Bernstein, Midrash and marginality: The Agunot of S. Y. Agnon and Devorah Baron. Hebrew Studies 42:7-58.
- Ezrahi, Sidra DeKoven (April 2004). "Sentient Dogs, Liberated Rams, and Talking Asses: Agnon's Biblical Zoo". AJS Review. 28 (1): 105–136. doi:10.1017/S0364009404000078. S2CID 163052331.
