= Roman Katsman =

Israeli researcher

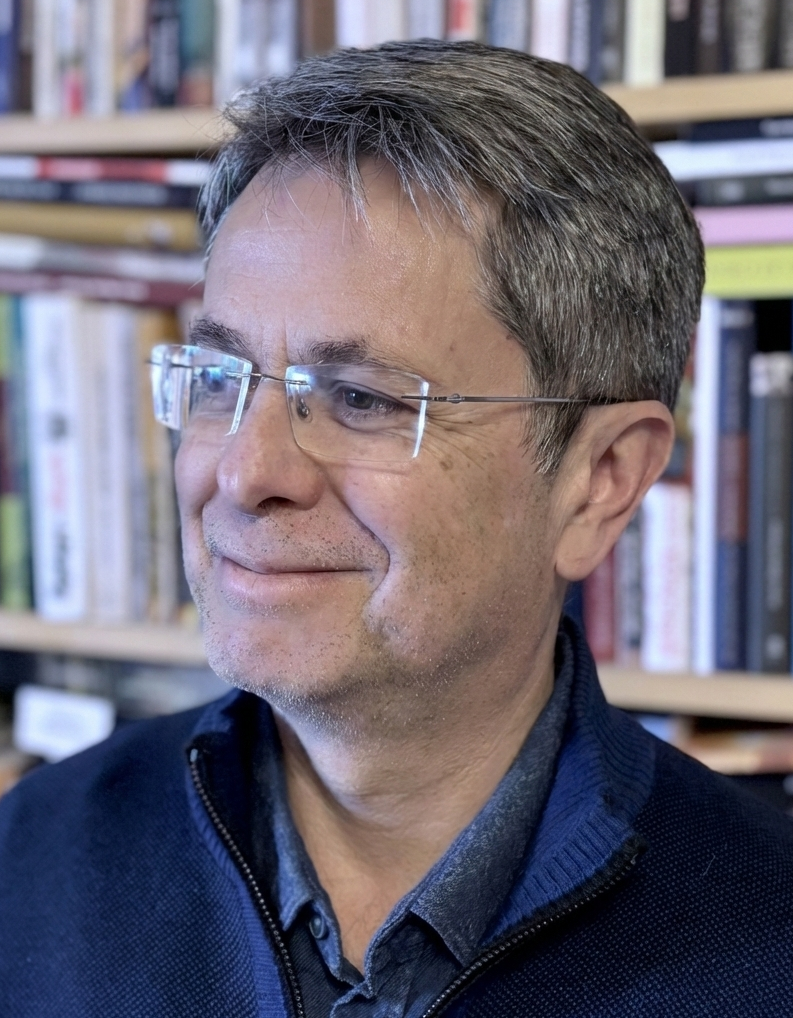
- Born: 26.11.1969
- Citizenship: Israel
- Website: https://hebrew-literature.biu.ac.il/en/node/570

Roman Katsman (Hebrew: רומן כצמן; born 1969) is an Israeli professor and researcher of Hebrew and Russian literature. He is Full Professor of the Department of Literature of the Jewish People in Bar-Ilan University.

== Biography ==
Katsman was born in Zhitomir (Ukraine) on November 26, 1969. He has lived in Israel since 1990. He earned his Ph.D. (cum laude) from Bar-Ilan University in 1999. The title of his dissertation was "Mythopoesis: Theory, Method and Application in the Selected Works by Dostoevsky and Agnon." Since 2000, Katsman has taught in the Department of Literature of the Jewish People in Bar-Ilan University. From 2014 to 2017, he served as the Head of the Department. Established the Program for Jewish-Russian Literature. Katsman is married to Tatyana and has two children - Anna and Eli.

== Research ==
=== Mythopoesis ===
Katsman's first book, The Time of Cruel Miracles (2002), is dedicated to developing a theory of mythopoesis, that is, how myth is created through the act of reading the literary text. Myth is defined (following Alexei Losev) as a miraculous history of personality given in words (the miracle in this case being perceived as the realization of the personality's transcendental purpose in empirical history). Based on Emmanuel Levinas' concept of revelation, a theory is proposed in which mythopoesis is seen as the personality's becoming towards its miracle in an ethical face-to-face encounter with another personality. A method for the study of literary mythopoesis is constructed on the foundation of this theory of mythopoesis.

=== Chaos theory (synopsis of the books) ===
This project continues in the direction of a theory of the literary figure as a mythopoeic personality. A dialogue with the René Girard and Eric Gans anthropological-philosophical theories has been developed, according to which a sign (in language and culture in general) is created in an originary scene of violence or prevention of violence towards a central personality (the victim), as a substitute for it. In this research, Girard's and Gans' theory is complemented with a theory of mythopoesis, according to which the personality's transformation into a sign is accompanied by a simultaneous process whereby the sign is transformed into a personality (this is the process of myth-creation). The two processes are treated as unified and feeding each other within a complex dynamic system. The system is then examined in terms of chaos theory. The discussion leads to the conclusion that the figure's origination is a chaotic system, characterized also by features of an autopoetic (living) system, in terms of the Humberto Maturana and Francisco Varela biological-cognitive theory. The book Poetics of Becoming (2005) is dedicated to this research, in which the theory of mythopoesis in its expanded form is examined through the works of Hebrew and Russian writers, including Agnon, Amos Oz, Meir Shalev, Orly Castel-Bloom, Etgar Keret, Dostoevsky, Mikhail Bulgakov, and Osip Mandelstam. The works by Isaac Babel and Mandelstam are discussed in the context of multi-culturalism and bi-national literature, leading to a new definition of Jewish-Russian literature.

=== Gestures (synopsis of the books and articles) ===
The book At the Other End of Gesture (2008) is devoted to the problem of gestures (body language) in literature. Based on recent advances in the modern science of gesture (Adam Kendon, David McNeill, Uri Hadar and others) a cognitive model is constructed of the processing of gestures in the course of reading a literary text, and a method is developed for an interdisciplinary study of the representation of gesture in text, from poetic, cultural, anthropological and semiological aspects. A series of discussions concerning the poetics of gesture in the writings of a number of modern Hebrew writers (Uri Nissan Gnessin, Isaac Dov Berkowitz, Yeshayahu Bershadsky, Gershon Shofman, Agnon, Jacob Steinberg, Etgar Keret, Judith Katzir, Meir Shalev, Aharon Appelfeld, Dorit Rabinyan) leads to far-reaching conclusions concerning their poetics and concerning the philosophy of gesture in modern culture. This study also examines how gesture functions as anthropological motive for creating art, and as one of the mechanisms whereby symbolism is created.

Some studies which have not been included in the last book are the following: spontaneous gestures in the Bible; gestures accompanying the reading/learning of the Torah among Yemenite Jews (a study at the crossroads between the science of gesture, visual anthropology and the anthropology of the body); a study on gestural practices in Jewish religious life; studies on gesture in the writings of Milorad Pavić as the key to his poetics (in his two major novels, Dictionary of the Khazars and Landscape Painted with Tea); a study on gesture in Dostoevsky's The Idiot in relation to the theme of man/body as machine.

=== Sincerity (synopsis of the book) ===
A Small Prophecy (2013) is a theoretical and applied research of sincerity as rhetorical and cultural, lingual and anthropological category. Sincerity and rhetoric provide two ways for constituting a personality (subject, identity, character) in the speech. They complement each other till their complete confluence in the intention of persuasion. Two opposite conceptions of sincerity – as genuine self-expression and as artificial "theatrical" performance – are presented as not effective, especially in such complex cultural phenomena as S.Y. Agnon's work. In the first part of the research, the analysis of sincere speech as rhetorical act leads to discussion of the rhetoric itself and to its repositioning in cultural-spiritual practice. By this course, the concept of cultural-communal rhetoric of sincerity has been shaped, which is applied to resolving the intricate problems roused within Agnon studies, particularly the problem of author's sincerity in representation of miracle, his religious or anti religious intentions. In the second part, the Book One of Ir u-mlo'a is discussed, focusing on the Agnon rhetoric and on what is called "Agnon's lessons in rhetoric and sincerity". The analysis brings out that Agnon's impossible, multi-intentional discourse on "the impossible" is aimed to scrutinize the realized possibilities of the historical existence of the Jewish community (on the scale from Buchach to the People of Israel), and to create new, not realized possibilities – the most mythic and true ones.

=== Alternative history (synopsis of the book) ===
The book Literature, History, Choice (2013) deals with one of the most popular subjects in the recent literature and cinematography – alternative (counterfactual, allo-history). Alternative history is not merely the definition of a historiographic method and of a subgenre of fantasy literature, but it is rather also a poetic and hermeneutical principle. One may discover foundations of the alternative history principle in works that have no connection at all to fantasy genres. In this case, one must speak of the poetics of historical alternative. Even when the work makes no overt use of the poetics of historical alternativity, the principle of historical alternativity can be used as a method of reading, that is, as a hermeneutic principle, which is used to reveal implicit historiographical and historical perceptions on which the poetics and ideology of the work are based. What makes it possible to speak of alternative history in such a sweeping sense is the observation that alternative history is not just oscillation between different histories but rather oscillation between alternative elements at four levels: myth (plot); personality (identity); choice (perception of history), and mode of choice (historiographical view). The mechanism of oscillation is identical at all of the levels and it consists of a return to the point of bifurcation in the past and a free choice of the new future. However, at every level, the historical, ethical, cultural and personalistic significance of the oscillation is different because at every level, different elements may be chosen. Thus, analysis of an implicit historical and historiographical discourse, which underlies every work of literature, is carried out using a multi-layered method.

The main point is that oscillation at each of these levels is what establishes the choice, as well as the subject and object of that choice. Without oscillation between unrealized possibilities, there can be no myth, no personality, no history, and no historiography. The oscillation does not happen after the poles of oscillation have been determined but is in fact what creates them. This oscillation is what creates the alternatives and not the other way around. Rhetoric is the internal mechanism that creates oscillation, and thus – creates the historical alternativity. To speak of alternative history is to speak of a mechanism for establishing meaning – of narrative, of personality, of memory, and of writing. Based on this, establishing meaning is a historical and personalistic creation, and thus it is an act of establishing ethics and of establishing truth.

Alternative history as a genre, as well as the principle of historical alternativity, is based on the implicit (and largely unconscious) metaphysical premise of the existence of a historical truth and of the possibility of proving it. Therefore this principle is not a postmodern or relativistic element but rather the opposite is true: alternative history was intended to repair the damage caused to culture by radical relativism which is characteristic of certain periods and ideologies, particularly postmodernism.

Agnon's oeuvre, and Ir u-meloa (The City and All It Has in It) in particular, is presented then as a classic example not only of historical writing but also of the poetics of historical alternativity. This research method is applied to Agnon's work in order to understand the complex philosophical-historical perceptions of the author. Both the theoretical analysis and the analysis of the works show that the nucleus of historical alternativity contains the question: "How does one choose?" or in other words, "How does one write (history)?" – this is the dilemma where oscillation between different historiographical perceptions unites with oscillation between different perceptions of writing on the one hand, and with oscillation between different ethical perceptions (i.e. concerning identity, memory, responsibility) on the other.

=== Russian-Language Israeli literature and Russian-Jewish Literature (synopsis of the books) ===
The book Nostalgia for a Foreign Land (2016) focuses on the last two and half decades of the history of Russian-language Israeli literature. It consists of chapters dedicated to Dina Rubina, Elizaveta Mikhailichenko and Yury Nesis, Nekoda Singer, and Mikhail Yudson.

== Publications ==
=== Books ===
- Неуловимая реальность: Сто лет русско-израильской литературы (1920–2020). Бостон: Academic Studies Press, 2020. ISBN 978-1-6446927-8-3, 978-5-6043579-3-4 (Elusive Reality: A Hundred Years of Russian-Israeli Literature (1920-2020))
- Высшая легкость созидания. Следующие сто лет русско-израильской литературы. Бостон: Academic Studies Press, 2021. ISBN 978-1-6446954-5-6, 978-5-6044709-8-5 (The Sublime Lightness of Creation. Next Hundred Years of Russian-Israeli Literature)
- Nostalgia for a Foreign Land: Studies in Russian-Language Literature in Israel. Series: Jews of Russia and Eastern Europe and Their Legacy. Brighton MA: Academic Studies Press, 2016. ISBN 978-1-6181-1528-7
- Literature, History, Choice: The Principle of Alternative History in Literature (S.Y. Agnon, The City with All That is Therein). Cambridge Scholars Publishing, 2013. ISBN 978-1-4438-5251-7
- Laughter in Heaven: Symbols of Laughter in the Works of S.Y. Agnon. (In Hebrew). Jerusalem: Magness Press, 2018. ("Skhok be-shamaim") ISBN 978-965-7763-88-9
- 'A Small Prophecy': Sincerity and Rhetoric in Ir u-meloa by S.Y. Agnon, in Hebrew, Bar-Ilan University Press, 2013. ("Nevua ketana") ISBN 978-965-226-438-1
- At the Other End of Gesture. Anthropological Poetics of Gesture in Modern Hebrew Literature, Begengung: Jüdische Studien, Frankfurt am Main, Peter Lang GmbH, 2008. ISBN 978-3-6315-6689-3
- Poetics of Becoming: Dynamic Processes of Mythopoesis in Modern and Postmodern Hebrew and Slavic Literature, Heidelberg University Publications in Slavistics, Frankfurt am Main, Peter Lang GmbH, 2005. ISBN 978-0-8204-9816-4
- The Time of Cruel Miracles: Mythopoesis in Dostoevsky and Agnon, Heidelberg University Publications in Slavistics, Frankfurt am Main, Peter Lang GmbH, 2002. ISBN 978-3-6313-7767-3

=== Edited ===
- Around the Point: Studies in Jewish Literature and Culture in Multiple Languages, ed. by Hillel Weiss, Roman Katsman, and Ber Kotlerman, Cambridge Scholars Publishing, 2014. ISBN 1-4438-5577-4, 978-1-4438-5577-8
- Two parallel volumes:

In English: The Parallel Universes of David Shrayer-Petrov: A Collection Published on the Occasion of the Writer's 85th Birthday, ed. Roman Katsman, Maxim D. Shrayer, Klavdia Smola. Boston: Academic Studies Press, 2021. ISBN 9781644695265, 9781644695289

In Russian: Parallel'nye vselennye Davida Shraera-Petrova: Sbornik statei i materialov k 85-letiiu pisatelia, ed. Roman Katsman, Klavdia Smola, Maxim D. Shrayer. St. Petersburg: Academic Studies Press/Bibliorossica, 2021.

- Two parallel volumes:

In English: Studies in the History of Russian-Israeli Literature. Edited by Roman Katsman and Maxim D. Shrayer. Boston: Academic Studies Press, 2023.

In Russian: Ocherki po istorii russko-izrail'skoi literatury. Edited by Roman Katsman and Maxim D. Shrayer. Boston: Academic Studies Press, 2023. ISBN 979-8-887191-88-1

=== Selected articles ===
- “My Thought Is Hungry”: The Hebrew Poetry of Gali-Dana Singer (in Hebrew), The Jerusalem Studies in Hebrew Literature, 31 (2020), pp. 565-601.
- Crisis of the Victimary Paradigm in Contemporary Russian Literature in Israel (An applied case study of Eric Gans's Generative Anthropology), Anthropoetics: The Journal of Generative Anthropology, XXIV, no. 1 Fall 2018.
- 'Parallelnye vselennye Davida Shraera-Petrova' (The Parallel Universes of David Shrayer-Petrov), Wiener Slawistischer Almanach, 79 (2017), pp. 255–279.
- Jewish fearless speech: towards a definition of Soviet Jewish nonconformism (F. Gorenshtein, F. Roziner, D. Shrayer-Petrov), East European Jewish Affairs, 48 (1), 2018, pp. 41–55.
- "Freakish Sacrifices": The Problem of Victimhood in Alexander Goldstein's Novel Quiet Fields (in Russian). Novoe literaturnoe obozrenie (New literary observer), 150 (2/2018), pp. 271–289.
- Stam: The Unbearable Lightness of Banality, or On the Nature of Etgar Keret's Humor,' Ben-Gurion University Review, Winter 2018.
- 'Krizis viktimnoj paradigmy. Sluchaj noveishej russko-izrailskoj literatury' (Crisis of Victimary Paradigm. A Case of Russian Literature in Israel). In RUSYCYSTYCZNE STUDIA LITERATUROZNAWCZE, # 27: Russian Literature and the Jewish Question, ed. Mirosława Michalska-Suchanek and Agnieszka Lenart. Katowice: Wydawnictwo Uniwersytetu Śląskiego, 2017, pp. 9–28.
- How Is Myth Possible? The Question of Shaping of the Historical-Personalistic Conception of Myth (Matvei Kagan and Mikhail Gershenson, 1919-1922) (in Russian), Issledovaniia po istorii russkoj mysli (Studies in Russian Intellectual History), 2017, pp. 513–538.
- Fearless Vulnerability of Nonconformism (I. Gabay, M. Grobman, G. Sapgir) (in Russian), Toronto Slavic Quarterly, # 59 (2017).
- Philosophy of Freedom in the Novel by Dennis Sobolev Jerusalem (in Russian), Studia Slavica Academiae Scientiarum Hungaricae, 62:2 (2017), pp. 459–474.
- Jerusalem: A Dissipative Novel by Dennis Sobolev (in Russian), Novoe literaturnoe obozrenie (New literary review), 143 (1/2017), pp. 291–312.
- "The Parable and Its Lesson" by S. Y. Agnon and the Thinking of Historical Alternativeness,' (in Hebrew), Mikan, 17 (2017), pp. 340–356.
- 'Eric Gans' Thinking of Origin, Culture, and of the Jewish Question vis-a-vis Hermann Cohen's Heritage,' Journal of Jewish Thought and Philosophy, 23, 2015, pp. 236–255.
- 'Network and Sacrifice in the Novel I/e_rus.olim by Elizaveta Mikhailichenko and Yury Nesis,' Toronto Slavic Quarterly, 54 (2015), pp. 27–49.
- 'Nekod Singer in Russian and Hebrew: Neoeclectism And Beyond', Symposium: A Quarterly Journal in Modern Literatures, 70:2, 2016, pp. 66–79.
- 'The Blue Altay: The Unknown Manuscripts of Avraam Vysotsky and the Genesis of the Novel Saturday and Sunday,' (in Russian), Toronto Slavic Quarterly, 56 (Spring 2016).
- 'Kotesh Grisin: The Alternative History of Agnon ('Ha-mevakshim lahem rav,' Ir u-Meloa),' (in Hebrew), Dappim le-Mekhkar be-Sifrut, 19, 2014, pp. 7–43.
- 'The Speech of Yakov Maze in Honor of Hermann Cohen,' (in Russian), translation and preface by Roman Katsman, in Issledovaniya po istorii russkoy mysli, vol. 10, Edited by Modest A. Kolerov and Nikolay S. Plotnikov, Moscow, Modest Kolerov, 2014, pp. 465–478.
- 'Boris Pasternak's Doctor Zhivago in the Eyes of the Israeli Writers and Intellectuals (A Minimal Foundation of Multilingual Jewish Philology),' in Around the Point: Studies in Jewish Multilingual Literature, ed. Hillel Weiss, Roman Katsman, Ber Kotlerman, Cambridge Scholars Publishing, 643-686.
- 'Etgar Keret: The Minimal Metaphysical Origin.' Symposium: A Quarterly Journal in Modern Literatures, vol. 67, 2013, pp. 189–204.
- 'Jewish Traditions: Active Gestural Practices in Religious Life,' Body-Language-Communication. An International Handbook on Multimodality in Human Interaction, ed. by Cornelia Müller, Alan Cienki, Ellen Fricke, Silva H. Ladewig, David McNeill, Sedinha Tessendorf. Series of Handbooks of Linguistics and Communication Sciences. Berlin-New York, Mouton de Gruyter, 2013, 320-329.
- 'Mordecai at the King's Gate: A Few Introductory Remarks to Matvei Kagan's 'Vom Begriff der Geschichte' (On the Concept of History),' in Eastern European Jewish Literature of the 20th and 21st Centuries: Identity and Poetics. Ed. by Klavdia Smola. Series: Die Welt der Slaven. München – Berlin – Washington/D.C., Verlag Otto Sagner, 2013, pp. 403–406.
- (As editor): Matvej Kagan. "Vom Begriff der Geschichte." Briefe: Simon Gulko – Matvej Kagan." In: Eastern European Jewish Literature of the 20th and 21st Centuries: Identity and Poetics. Series: Die Welt der Slaven. Ed. by Klavdia Smola. München – Berlin – Washington/D.C., Verlag Otto Sagner, 2013, pp. 406–432.
- 'Miracle, Sincerity and Rhetoric in the Writing of S.Y. Agnon' (in Hebrew), Ma'ase Sippur: Studies in Jewish Prose, vol. 3, ed. by Avidov Lipsker and Rella Kushelevsky, Ramat-Gan, Bar Ilan University Press, 2013, pp. 307–332.
- 'Matvei Kagan: Judaism and the European Cultural Crisis,' Journal of Jewish Thought & Philosophy, 21 (2013), pp. 73–103.
- 'Love and Bewilderment: Matvei Kagan's Literary Critical Concepts,' Partial Answers. Journal of Literature and the History of Ideas, 11:1 (2013), pp. 9–28.
- 'Sincerity, Rhetoric and Representation of Miracle in Literature' (in Hebrew), Mi'kan 12 (2012), pp. 126–143.
- (With Ber Kotlerman), 'Mordechai Nisan Kagan: Peretz un di folks-mytologie' (Peretz and Mythology), Les Cahiers Yiddish / Yidishe Heftn 168, 2012, pp. 3–7.
- 'Cultural Rhetoric, Generative Anthropology, and Narrative Conflict,' Anthropoetics 17, no. 2 (2012).
- (With Ber Kotlerman), 'Mordechai Nisan Kagan (Matvei Isaevich Kagan): Der Fargesener Russish-Yidisher Neo-Kantianer,' preface to: Matvei Kagan, 'Ivan Sergeevich Turgenev,' (in Yiddish), Yerushalaimer Almanac 29 (2012), pp. 433–442.
- The Unrealized Cantors: The Community Rhetoric of S. Y. Agnon' (in Hebrew), Ayin Gimel: A Journal of Agnon Studies, vol. 2, 2012, pp. 131–137.
- 'From Buchach to Talpiot: On the Book of Dan Laor S. Y. Agnon (2008)', (in Hebrew), Cathedra, 140, 2011, pp. 180–183.
- 'The Brit of Historical Remembrance', Zmanim, (in Hebrew), 116, 2011, pp. 111– 113.
- 'S.Y. Agnon's Community Rhetoric: The heroism and crisis of power in two tales of gabbais (treasurers) from 'Ir U-meloah (The City and All it Has in It)', Hebrew Studies, 52, 2011, pp. 363–378.
- 'To Read by Body: Gesture Studies in Culture and Literature' (in Hebrew), Ma'ase Sippur: Studies in Jewish Prose, vol. 2, ed. by Avidov Lipsker and Rella Kushelevsky, Bar Ilan University Press, 2009, pp. 373–404.
- 'Gesture in Literature: Cognitive Processing and Cultural Semiosis (Case Study in Agnon's Stories)', (in Hebrew), Mekhkarey Yerushalaim be-sifrut ivrit (The Studies in Hebrew Literature), 22 (2008), pp. 407–436.
- 'The Problem of Spontaneous Gestures in the Bible. A Case Study of Gestural Poetics', (in Hebrew), Mikan 9 (2008), pp. 80–96.
- 'An Invisible Gesture of A Jester: Body and Machine in The Idiot by F.M. Dostoevsky', Toronto Slavic Quarterly 26 (2008).
- 'Poetics of Gestures in the Writing of Milorad Pavic (Dictionary of Khazars)' (in Hebrew), Dappim: Research in Literature 16-17, 2007-2008, pp. 383–400.
- 'Gestures Accompanying Torah Learning/Recital Among Yemenite Jews', Gesture: The International Journal for the Interdisciplinary Study of Gestures and Nonverbal Communication (John Benjamins Publishing), 7:1 (2007), pp. 1–19.
- 'The Dance of Myths: Mythopoesis and Narrative Ethics', (in Hebrew), Ma'ase Sippur: Studies in Jewish Prose, vol. 1, ed. by Avidov Lipsker and Rella Kushelevsky, Bar Ilan University Press, 2005, pp. 431–446.
- 'Anthropoetic Gesture. A Key to Milorad Pavić's Poetics (Landscape Painted with Tea)', Toronto Slavic Quarterly 12 (2005).
- 'The Memory of the Body: The Novel-Myth by Meir Shalev Be'veito Be'midbar', (in Hebrew), Dappim: Research in Literature, vol. 14-15, 2005, pp. 269–291.
- 'Personality, Ethics and Ideology in the Postmodern Mythopoesis by Etgar Keret' (in Hebrew), Mi'kan, 4 (January 2005), pp. 20–41.
- 'The Myth of Myth-Creation in Ido ve-Eynam by Agnon', (in Hebrew), Criticism & Interpretation (Bar Ilan University), 35-36 (2002), pp. 231–245.
- 'The Miracle of Literature: An Ethical-Aesthetical Theory of Mythopoesis', Analecta Husserliana LXXV (2002), pp. 211–231.
- 'Personal-Historical Conception of Myth in Forevermore by Agnon' (in Hebrew), Alei-Siah 45 (Summer 2001), pp. 53–63.
- 'Generative Anthropology in the Works by Agnon' (in Hebrew), Proceedings of the 13 Congress of the World for Jewish Studies, 2001.
- 'Dostoevsky's A Raw Youth: Mythopoesis as the Dialectics of Absence and Presence', The Dostoevsky Journal: An Independent Review 1 (2000), pp. 85–95.
- 'Crime and Punishment: Face to Face' (in Russian), Dostoevsky i mirovaja kultura/Dostoevsky and the World Culture, N. 12 (1999), pp. 165–176.

=== Translations ===
==== Into Russian ====
- Shmuel Yosef Agnon, 'Poka ne pridiot Elijahu,' ('Ad she-yavo Elijahu'), trans. and afterword by Roman Katsman, Ierusalimsky zhurnal, 48 (2014), pp. 155–170. https://web.archive.org/web/20141029070558/http://magazines.russ.ru/ier/2014/48/
- Shmuel Yosef Agnon, 'Iz polskikh skazochnykh istoriy,' (Sipurei Polin), trans. and afterword by Roman Katsman, Ierusalimsky zhurnal, 52 (2015), pp. 185–198.
- Miron Izakson, 'Poems', Artikl, 29 (2015).

==== Into Hebrew ====
- David Shrayer-Petrov, Mivkhar shirim, trans. from Russian by Roman Katsman, Megaphone, http://megafon-news.co.il/asys/archives/186500.
