= Dan Miron =

Israeli-born American literary critic and author

- דן מירון
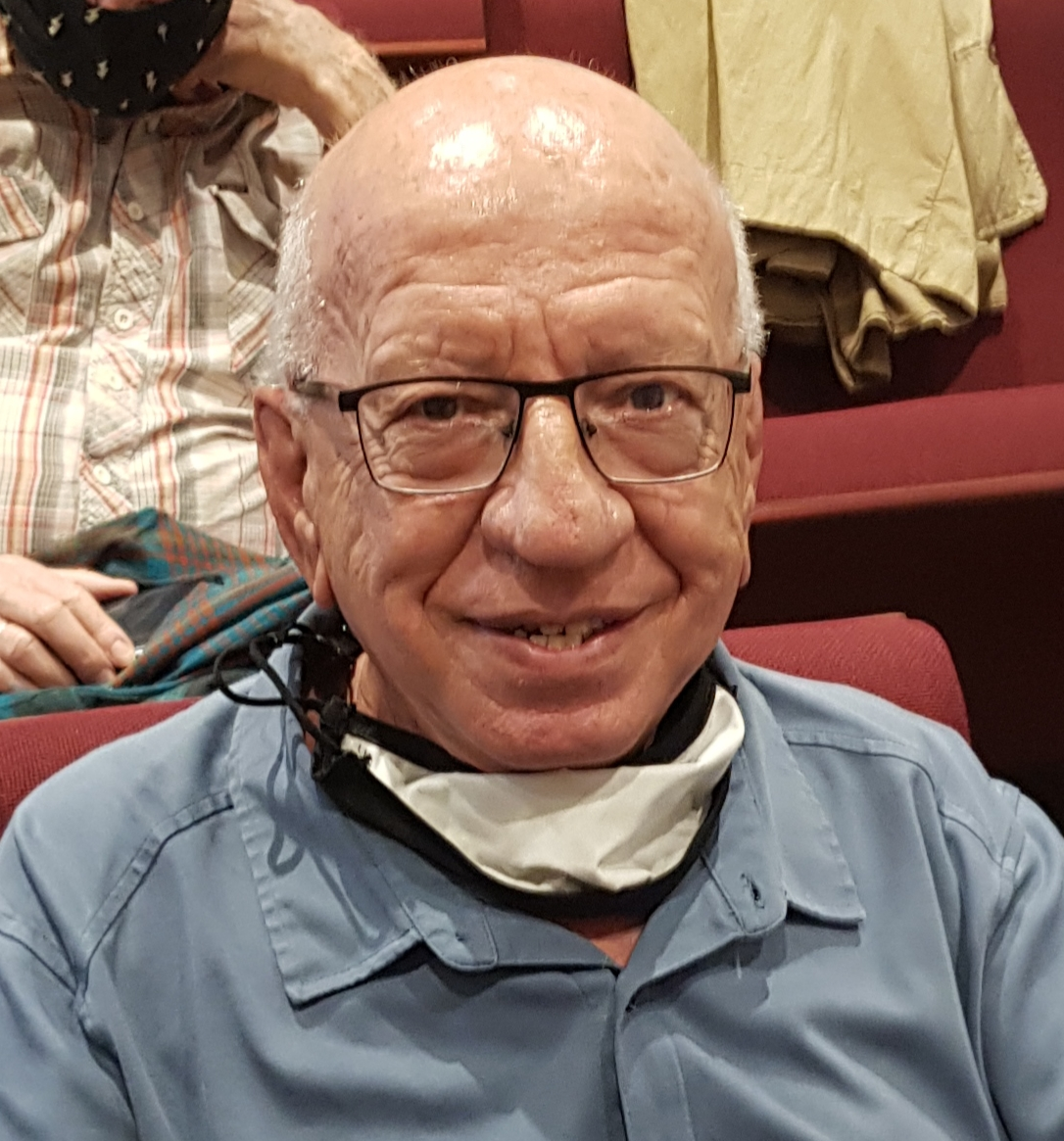
- Miron in 2021
- Born: November 13, 1934 (age 91); Tel Aviv, Mandatory Palestine
- Occupations: Literary critic, author, professor
- Employer(s): Hebrew University of Jerusalem, Columbia University
- Known for: Modern Hebrew and Yiddish literature
- Awards: Bialik Prize (1980); Itzik Manger Prize (1998); Israel Prize (1993)

Dan Miron (Hebrew: דן מירון; born 13 November 1934) is an Israeli-born American literary critic, author, and professor of Hebrew.

An expert on modern Hebrew and Yiddish literature, Miron is a Professor emeritus at the Hebrew University of Jerusalem. He is currently the Leonard Kaye Professor of Hebrew and Comparative Literature in the Department of Middle Eastern, South Asian, and African Studies (MESAAS) at Columbia University.

Since the 1950s Professor Miron has published dozens of books and hundreds of articles on modern Hebrew and Yiddish writers, including Hayim Nahman Bialik, Nathan Alterman, Uri Zvi Greenberg, and Sholem Aleichem.

In 2012, Miron co-founded the Afik Publishing House of Israeli Literature with Iftach Alony and Lily Perry.

== Awards and critical acclaim ==
- In 1980 Miron was awarded the Bialik Prize for Jewish thought.
- In 1993 he received the Israel Prize for Hebrew literature.
- In 1998 he was awarded the Itzik Manger Prize for contributions to Yiddish letters.
- In 2010 he won a National Jewish Book Award in the Scholarship category for From Continuity to Contiguity
- In 2020 he was chosen as a member of the Israel Academy of Sciences and Humanities.
- The Jewish Daily Forward called Miron "the doyen of Israeli literary criticism."

== Bibliography ==
- Haim Hazaz : a Monograph (Hebrew: חיים הזז : אסופת מסות). Hapoalim Publishers, 1959
- Sholem Aleichem – an essay (Hebrew: שלום עליכם : פרקי מסה). Masada Publishers, 1970 (An enlarged edition published in 1976)
- Sholem Aleichem: person, persona, presence (English). YIVO Institute, 1972
- A Traveler Disguised: The Rise of Modern Yiddish Fiction in the Nineteenth Century (Judaic Traditions in Literature, Music, and Art (English). Schocken Books, 1973
- Four Faces in Contemporary Hebrew Literature: Studies in The Works of Alterman, Ratosh, Yizhar and Shamir (Hebrew: ארבע פנים בספרות העברית בת ימינו, עיונים ביצירות אלתרמן, רטוש, יזהר, שמיר), Schocken Publishers, 1975
- Between Truth and Vision – the Beginnings of the Hebrew and Yiddish novel in the Nineteenth Century (Hebrew: בין חזון לאמת : ניצני הרומאן העברי והיידי המאה ה-19). Bialik Institute, 1979
- Open Notebook; Discussions of Current Israeli Fiction (Hebrew: פנקס פתוח : שיחות על הסיפורת בתשל״ח), Hapoalim Publishers, 1979
- Lights' Adjuatment – 20th Century Hebrew Fiction (Hebrew: כיוון אורות : תחנות בסיפורת העברית המודרנית). Schocken Books, 1979
- Der Imazh fun Shtetl – the fictional world of the Jewish Shtetl in the works of Sh. Y Abramovitsh and Sholem Aleichem, I. L. Peretz (Yiddish: דער אימאזש פון שטעטל : דריי ליטערארישע שטודיעס). Hakibbutz Hameuchad Publishing House, 1981
- Taking Leave of The Impoverished Self: Ch. N. Bialki's Early Poetry, 1891–1901 (Hebrew: הפרידה מן האני העני, מהלך התפתחות שירתו המוקדמת של חיים נחמן ביאליק 1891 – 1901). The Open University Press, 1986.
- Founding Fathers, Stepsisters: The Advent of Hebrew Women's Poetry & Other Essays (Hebrew: אמהות מייסדות, אחיות חורגות , על ראשית שירת הנשים העברית). Hakibbutz Hameuchad Publishing House, 1987
- If There is No Jerusalem – Essays on Israeli literature and Society (Hebrew: אם לא תהיה ירושלים : מסות על הספרות העברית בהקשר תרבותי-פוליטי). Hakibbutz Hameuchad Publishing House, 1987
- Come, Night – Irrationalism in early 20th Century Hebrew Literature (Hebrew: בואה, לילה : הספרות העברית בין הגיון לאי-גיון במפנה המאה העשרים : עיונים ביצירות ח״נ ביאליק ומ״י ברדיצ׳בסקי). Dvir Publishing House, 1987
- When Loners Come Together – a Generational Portrait of Hebrew Literature at the Beginning of the Twentieth Century (Hebrew: בודדים במועדם : לדיוקנה של הרפובליקה הספרותית העברית בתחילת המאה העשרים). Am Oved Publishing, 1987
- Ashkenaz: Modern Hebrew Literature and the Premodern German Jewish Experience (English) . Leo Beck Institute, 1989
- Founding Mothers, Stepsisters – How Hebrew Women's Poetry started (Hebrew: אמהות מייסדות, אחיות חורגות : על שתי התחלות בשירה הארצישראלית המודרנית). Hakibbutz Hameuchad Publishing House, 1994 (An enlarged edition published in 2004)
- Involved: Essays on Literature, Culture, and Society (Hebrew: נוגע בדבר : מסות על ספרות, תרבות וחברה). Zamora Publishing, 1994
- Facing the Silent Brother – The Poetry of the 1948 War (Hebrew: מול האח השותק : עיונים בשירת מלחמת העצמאות). Keter Publishing House, 1992
- News from the Arctic Zone – Studies in modern Hebrew Poetry (Hebrew: חדשות מאזור הקוטב : עיונים בשירה העברית החדשה). Zamora Publishing, 1993
- The Imaginary Physician: Classical Hebrew and Yiddish literature (Hebrew: הרופא המדומה : עיונים בסיפורת היהודית הקלאסית). Hakibbutz Hameuchad Publishing House, 1995
- An Estranged Classic –a Study of S.Y.Agnon's 'The Bridal Canopy' (Hebrew: הסתכלות ברבנכר : על ׳הכנסת כלה׳ מאת ש״י עגנון וסביביה). Hakibbutz Hameuchad Publishing House, 1996
- Posterity Hooked : U.N.Gnessin's Stories Interpreted (Hebrew: חחים באפו של הנצח : יצירתו של אורי ניסן גנסין). Mosad Bialik, 1997
- "Man is Nothing But…" – the Weakness of Power, the Power of the Weak: a Study in the Poetry of Power (Hebrew: האדם אינו אלא-- : חולשת-הכוח, עוצמת החולשה: עיונים בשירה). Zamora Publishing, 1999
- Snow of the Dove's Wing – The poetry of Abraham Sutskever (Hebrew: שלג על כנף היונה : פגישות עם שירתו של אברהם סוצקוור). Keshev leshira Publishing, 1999
- The Image of the Shtetl and other Studies of Modern Jewish Imagination (English). Syracuse University Press, 2000
- H.N.Bialik and the Prophetic Mode in modern Hebrew Poetry (English). Syracuse University Press, 2000
- From the Worm – A Butterfly; Young Nathan Alterman, a monograph (Hebrew: פרפר מן התולעת : נתן אלתרמן הצעיר, אישיותו ויצירתו). The Open University, 2001
- The Fragile Power – a Study if Yehudit Hendel's Fiction (Hebrew: הכוח החלש : עיונים בסיפורת של יהודית הנדל). Hakibbutz Hameuchad Publishing House, 2002
- Akdamut – Introducing Uri Zvi Greenberg (Hebrew: אקדמות לאצ״ג). Mosad Bialik, 2002
- The Dark Side of Sholem Aleichem's Laughter (Hebrew: הצד האפל בצחוקו של שלום עליכם : מסות על חשיבותה של הרצינות ביחס ליידיש ולספרותה). Am Oved Publishing, 2004
- In the City of Slaughter – a belated Visit (Hebrew: בעיר ההרגה – ביקור מאוחר). Resling Publishing, 2005 (Together with Hannan Hever and Michael Gluzman)
- Relax, then Touch – A new view of Jewish literary interrelationships (Hebrew: הרפיה לצורך נגיעה : לקראת חשיבה חדשה על ספרויות היהודים). Am Oved Publishing, 2005
- The Blind Library – Mixed Prose 1980–2005 (Hebrew: הספריה הָעִוֶרֶת : פרוזה מעורבת, 1980–2005). Yediot Books; Sifre Ḥemed, 2005
- The Shock of Independence: Reverberations in Early Israeli Poetry (English). Hunter College Press, 2006
- On the Poverty of Literairiness – a Study of Sholem Aleichem (Hebrew: על דלותה של הספרותיות : עיון במונולוג ׳עצה׳ מאת שלום עליכם). Hakibbutz Hameuchad Publishing House, 2007
- The Prophetic Mode in Modern Hebrew Poetry and Other Essays on Modern Hebrew Literature (English). Toby Press, New Milford, Conn. 2010
- From Continuity to Contiguity : Toward a New Jewish Literary Thinking (English). Stanford University Press, 2010
- Half Past Nine – on the Fiction of A.B. Yehoshua (Hebrew: תשע וחצי של א.ב. יהושע : מבט ׳אשכנזי׳ של שני רומאנים ׳ספרדיים׳). Hakibbutz Hameuchad Publishing House, 2011
- The Focalizing Chrystal – on the Poetry and Prose Fiction of Vladimir Jabotinsky (Hebrew: הגביש הממקד : פרקים על זאב ז׳בוטינסקי המספר והמשורר). Mosad Bialik, 2011
- From Mouth to Ear – Sholem Aleichem's Art of the Monologue (Hebrew: מפה לאוזן : שיחות ומחשבות על אמנות המונולוג של שלום עליכם). Afik Books, 2012
- More!: Cognitive Patterns in Early Israeli Poetry (Hebrew: עוד! : תשתיות קוגניטיביות בשירה הישראלית המוקדמת). Afik Books, 2013
- Why Gnessin? New Studies of a Hebrew Master (Hebrew: מדוע גנסין? שלושה עיונים). Mosad Bialik, 2014
- The Animal in the Synagogue – Aspects of Kafka's Jewishness (Hebrew: החיה בבית הכנסת : היבטים ביהודיות של פרנץ קפקא). Afik Books, 2016
- From Experience to Ritual – the Crisis of Hebrew Modernism in the 1930's: the Case of Tessler (Hebrew: מחוויה לפולחן : משבר המודרניזם בשירה הארץ-ישראלית : מקרה אליהו טסלר). Mosad Bialik, 2016
- Burning Sparks – on the Poetry of Leah Ayalon (Hebrew: גיצים בוערים – על שירת לאה אילון). Even Hoshen Private Press, 2017
- The Orphic Voice, Vols I-II, Israeli Women's Poetry (Hebrew: הקול האורפיאי : עיונים בשירתן של משוררות ישראליות (שני חלקים)). Afik Books, 2017
- The Stars Vindicated : Nathan Alterman's "Stars Outside" Re-Viewed (Hebrew: הכוכבים לא רימו : כוכבים בחוץ מאת נתן אלתרמן – קריאה מחדש). Am Oved Publishing, 2019 (Together with Ariel Hirschfeld)
- Approximations : Studies of Israeli Poetry (Hebrew: דוקים : עיונים בשירה הישראלית). Afik Books, 2021
- Between Two Mountains. Literary Pairs – Proximity, Distance & Creative Friction (Hebrew: בין שני הרים : ״זוגות סופרים״ : קרבה, ריחוק וחיכוך יצירתי). Bar-Ilan University Press, 2021
