= Shira (novel) =

Novel by Shmuel Yosef Agnon

Book cover of Shira.

Shira (Hebrew: שירה) is a 1971 posthumously-published unfinished Hebrew-language novel by Shmuel Yosef Agnon first serialized in Haaretz between 1948 and 1966, his longest novel at 558 pages and the last one he wrote. It was published by Schocken Books and edited by his daughter Emuna Yaron, who also wrote the afterword, and is widely considered one of the greatest Israeli novels.

== Synopsis ==
Set in Jerusalem in the 1930s and 1940s, the story follows Dr. Manfred Herbst, a middle-aged German-Jewish lecturer of Byzantine history at the Hebrew University of Jerusalem who suffers from boredom and spends his days prowling the streets searching for Shira, the beguiling nurse he met when his wife, Henrietta, was giving birth to their third child. Against the background of 1930s Jerusalem and the 1936–1939 Arab riots, Dr. Herbst wages war against the encroachment of age.
