= Tale of the Goat =

Tale of the Goat is a short story by S. Y. Agnon. It is also known as The Fable of the Goat. The story was originally written in Hebrew.

Tale of the Goat is also a short animation, in Yiddish, by Max Cohen, inspired by the story. Its Yiddish title is Di Mayse fun di Tsig, it is a winner of the coveted Judge's choice "Palm d'Schnorrers" at Heeb Magazine's first film festival, the Heeb Film Fest London 2004. An English translation by Barney Rubin of the Fable of the Goat was published in December 1966 in Commentary magazine.
