= Lily Perry =

Israeli writer, novelist, editor and critic

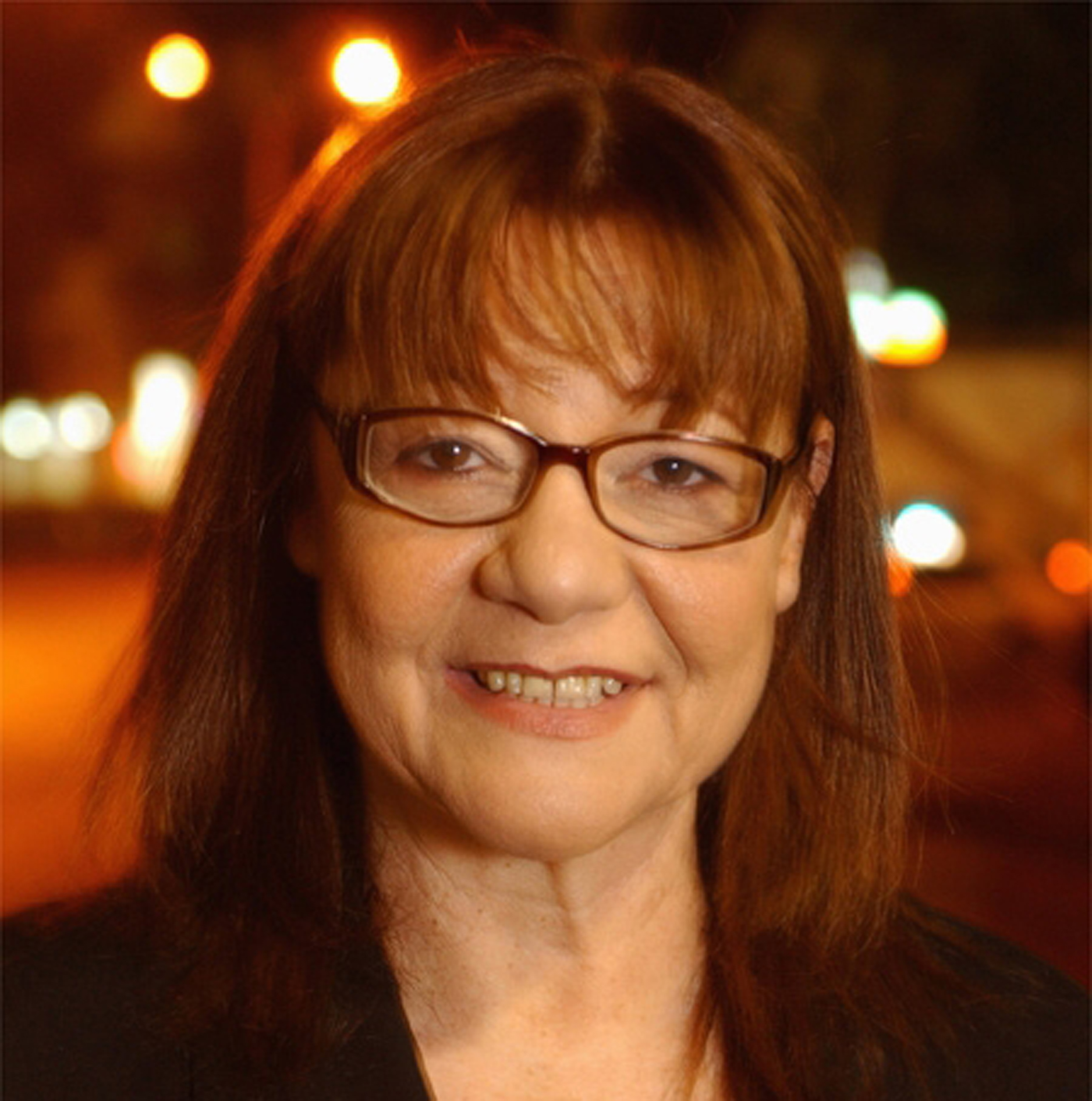
Lily Perry

Lily Perry (Hebrew: לילי פרי; born 1953) is an Israeli writer, novelist, editor, and critic. She is the founder and editor of “Totem Books” publishing house and “Salonet” literature site.

== Biography ==
Lily Perry is the first child of Romanian-born parents. Her father was a prisoner in a concentration camp during World War II, and her mother made Aliyah to Mandatory Palestine before the war. She was born in Hadera to impoverished parents, wandering the country searching for a steady income. The family settled at Netanya, where Lily grew up since she was nine. She was a youth guide at Sde Boker in her mandatory army service at the Israel Defense Forces. She earned a BA in general and Judaist philosophy from Tel Aviv University.

Perry started writing professionally in 1973 as a journalist and editor in HaOlam HaZeh, Al HaMishmar and Yedioth Ahronoth, which was Israel's largest newspaper by circulation. In Yedioth Ahronoth, she wrote the column “Figure”, about famous historical couples, especially women. She was the editor and writer of the “Persona” section in Al HaMishmar. During 1978–1996, she worked as a Humanities and Social science editor at the Open University of Israel. She was a news editor for Yedioth Ahronoth newspaper and Yedioth Books and a writing workshop instructor.

Since 1978 till today (2024), Perry has worked as a book editor in the genres of non-fiction, prose, and Poetry. In 2012, she established with Prof. Dan Miron and the writer Iftach Alony “Afik Books” publishing house. In 2002, she received the Olschwang Award; in 2006, she won the Prime Minister's Prize for Hebrew Literary Works. In 2013, she left Afik and established “Totem Books” publishing house, and serves as its editor-in-chief. Since 2015, she has been editor-in-chief of “Salonet” literature site.

Perry published seven books, six novels, and one "Petty Whims" with Yoram Barak, a non-fiction book. Her second book, "Golem in the Circle," was published in five editions in Keter Publishing House and sold 5,000 copies; it was published again in Yedioth Books in 2007. It was adapted into an award-winning movie under that name in 1993, including the Ophir Award, Wolgin Award for Israeli Cinema, Festival du cinéma méditerranéen de Montpellier Award, and the Uruguay International Film Festival award. and dramatized and presented as a one-woman play performed in Theatronetto, Tzavta, and Omanut Laam. Her book, “Swans in Jerusalem beach”, was included among the twelve finalists in the long list of Sapir Prize 2020.

Prof. Gabriel Moked delineated her artistic perspective and themes: "This author is one of the most promising forces in our literature… One of the main spirits in our feminine literature… More than any other narrator, she deals with the socio-economic spheres in Israel… Her novels depict a salient female character… Who is struggling in her social realms… The male characters are divided into two categories: the first category is "the bad guys" who misunderstand the women and strive to control them in relationships or public officials or mobs that get in the female's way and make their lives hard. The second category is supported men, whom the females alienate as their suitors... we can notice in her novels interactions between realism and fantasy... another feature in her novels is presenting the plots from the character's point of view. Sometimes, we can understand who his voice is, and more frequently, it seems like an anonymous point of view, at least at first sight; as the novel developed, the figure's nature unraveled."

== Family ==
Lily Perry is remarried, lives in Tel Aviv, and has two sons.

== Her Books ==
- Bare Eyes, Bustan Books, 1974.
- Golem in the Circle, Keter Publishing House, 1988; published in five editions.
- Dancing on the Water, Hakibbutz Hameuchad - Sifriat Poalim Publishing House, 1994.
- The Executioner’s Visit, Yedioth Books, 1999.
- Petty Whims (with Yoram Barak), Yedioth Books, 2004.
- Golem in the Circle, a new edition, Yedioth Books, 2007; with a foreword by prof. Dan Miron.
- Sonnet, Kinneret Zmora-Bitan Dvir, 2010.
- Swans in Jerusalem beach, Totem Books, 2019.
