= Nurit Zarchi =

Israeli poet and author

- נורית זרחי
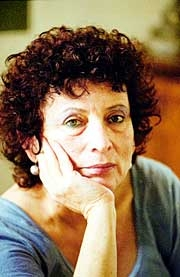
- Nurit Zarchi
- Born: 19 October 1941 (age 84); Jerusalem, Mandatory Palestine
- Occupations: Poet; Author; Journalist
- Known for: Children's literature, poetry, prose
- Awards: Bialik Prize (1999); Israel Prize for literature (2021)

Nurit Zarchi (Hebrew: נורית זרחי; born Jerusalem, October 19, 1941; 28 Tishri 5702 AM) is an Israeli poet and author for adults and children.

Her father was the author Israel Zarchi. He died when she was six, leaving her an orphan. She was raised at Kibbutz Geva as a guest. Later she went to Ein Harod, where she completed her secondary schooling. After her military service, she completed studies in psychology at the Hebrew University of Jerusalem. She earned bachelor's degrees in literature and philosophy at Tel Aviv University.

Zarchi has published many poems in children's newspapers. She has been a journalist for Yedioth Ahronoth. She has published more than one hundred books of children's literature, poetry, prose, and research.

== Awards ==
In 1999, Zarchi was the co-recipient (jointly with Aharon Almog and Yoram Kaniuk) of Bialik Prize for literature. In addition, she has been awarded many other prestigious prizes for her literary work, including the Prime Minister's Prize and several citations on the IBBY (International Board on Books for Young People) Honour List. In 2021 she received the Israel Prize for literature.

== Selected books ==
- Otobiographya Shell Delet ("Autobiography of a Door", 2018)
- Balua (Swallowed", 2016)
- Ahavata Shell Rosie Postil (Rosie Postil's Love, 2014)
- Bezel Gvirtenu ("In Our Lady's Shadow", 2013)
- Ani Ohev Lishrok Ba-Rehov ("I Like Whistling in the Street", 1967)
- Kaf Etz U-Kdera Shtuha ("Wooden Spoon and Flat Plate", 1969)
- Avigail Me-Har Ha-Melakhim ("Abigail from the Kings' Mountain", 1989)
- Amori Asig Atusa ("Amori Catches Up and Fly", 1992)
- Tinturu, A Tiny Elephant (in English translation, 1996), originally Tinturu Pila Ketana Meod (1993)
- Miligram ("Milligram", 1997)
- Cristabella O Sh'ela L'Rembrandt ("Cristabella or a Question for Rembrandt", 1997)
- Ketem Keter Ketchup Ahava ("Color, Crown, Ketchup, Love", 1998)
- Ha-Ritzpa Mitnadnedet ("The Floor Rocks", 2003)
- Sipur Lo Shimushi ("A Useless Story", 2003)
- Pa'am Haya Ve-Pa'am Lo ("Once Was, Once Wasn't", 2004)

== See also ==
- List of Bialik Prize recipients
