= The Bridal Canopy =

Novel by Shmuel Yosef Agnon

The Bridal Canopy (Hebrew: הכנסת כלה, Hakhnasat Kallah), a novel by Shmuel Yosef Agnon, is considered to be one of the first classics of modern Hebrew literature. In 1966, Agnon shared the Nobel Prize in Literature, the first author to do so writing in modern Hebrew.

== Synopsis ==
Agnon's novel describes the fictional wanderings of Reb Yudel through the Jewish villages of Galicia at the beginning of the 19th century, in search of a bridegroom and a dowry for his daughter. A modern critic described Agnon's fictional Reb Yudel as "naively pious." Others have characterized the fictional Reb Yudel as a Jewish archetype of Don Quixote.

Avraham Holtz has explored the roots of Agnon's central character in a character from Yiddish folklore, Reb Yudel Hasid.

The English translation by Israel Meir Lask was first published in 1937 by Doubleday and then in 1967 from the publisher Schocken Books New York.
