= Maxim D. Shrayer =

Russian-American writer (born 1967)

- Максим Давидович Шраер
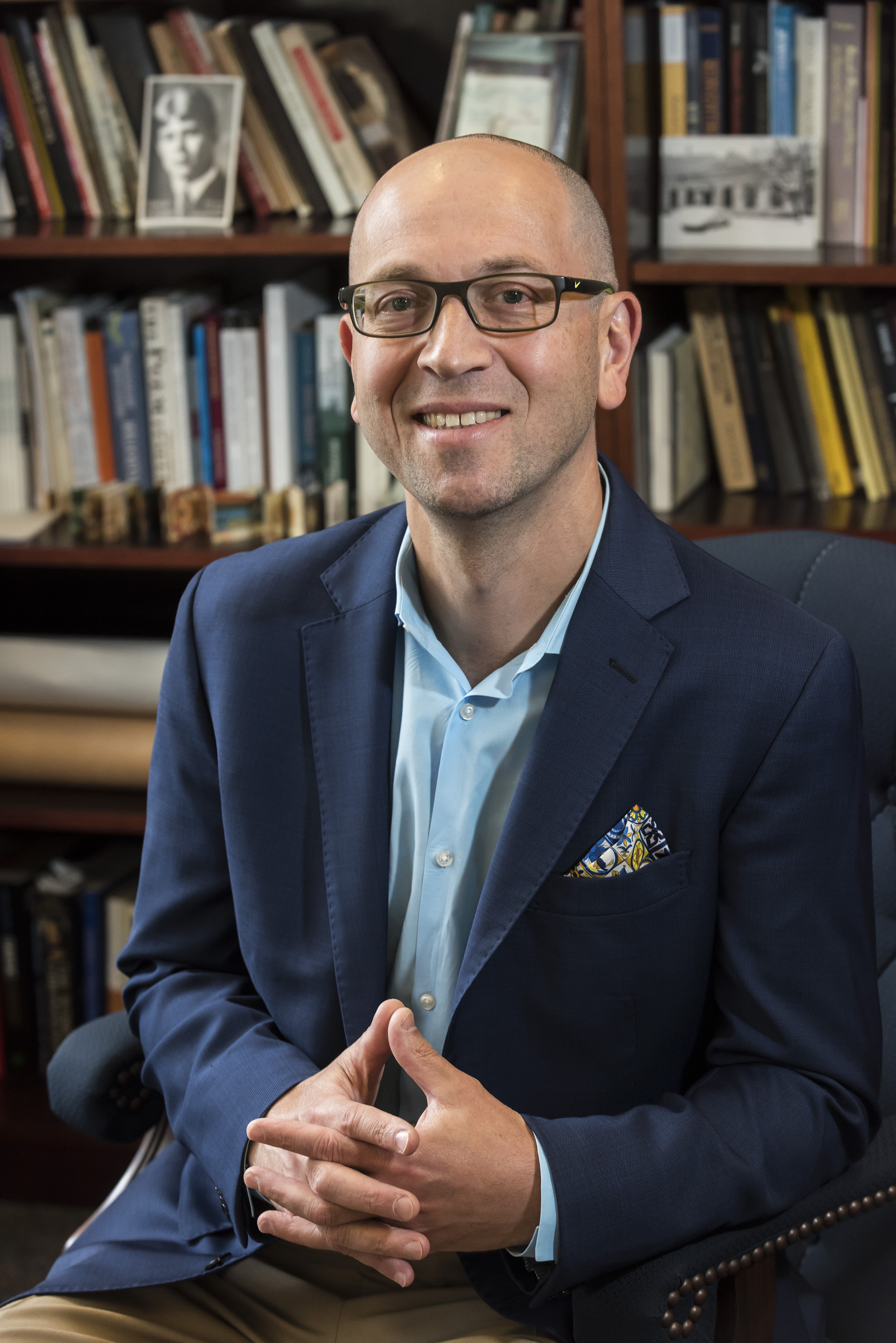
- Born: Maksim Davidovich Shrayer; 5 June 1967 (age 59); Moscow, Russian SFSR, Soviet Union
- Citizenship: American
- Education: Brown University, Yale University
- Occupations: Author; literary scholar; translator; professor
- Spouse: Dr. Karen E. Lasser
- Writing career
- Notable awards: National Jewish Book Award (2007) Guggenheim Fellowship (2012)
- Website: shrayer.com

Maxim D. Shrayer (Russian: Шраер, Максим Давидович; born June 5, 1967, Moscow, USSR) is a bilingual Russian-American author, translator, and literary scholar, and professor of Russian, English, and Jewish Studies at Boston College.

== Biography ==
Shrayer was born and grew up in Moscow, USSR, in the family of the writer David Shrayer-Petrov, and the translator Emilia Shrayer. Among his ancestors on the Shrayer side is the Russian-Israeli writer Batya Kahana (1901-1978). Together with his parents he spent almost nine years as a refusenik before immigrating to the US in the summer of 1987.

Shrayer attended Moscow University, Brown University (BA 1989), Rutgers University (MA 1990), and Yale University (Ph.D. 1995).

Since 1996 he has been teaching at Boston College, where he is presently a professor of Russian, English, and Jewish Studies and co-founded the Jewish Studies Program. Shrayer founded and moderates the Michael B. Kreps Readings (Крепсовские Чтения) in Russian Émigré Literature at Boston College. From 2017 to 2021, Shrayer directed the Project on Russian & Eurasian Jewry at Harvard's Davis Center.

Shrayer lives in Brookline and South Chatham, Massachusetts with his wife Dr. Karen E. Lasser, a medical doctor and researcher, their two daughters, Mira and Tatiana, and their silver Jewdle, Stella. Shrayer's younger daughter, Tatiana Rebecca Shrayer, won second prize in the 2019 Stone Soup book contest, resulting in the publication of her poetry collection Searching for Bow and Arrows.

== Critical/biographical writing and literary translations ==
Shrayer has authored, co-authored, edited, or co-edited more than thirty books in English and Russian. He has translated into English poetry and prose by over forty authors, many of them Jewish-Russian writers, including four books of fiction by his father, David Shrayer-Petrov, which he edited and cotranslated: Jonah and Sarah, Autumn in Yalta, Dinner with Stalin, and Doctor Levitin.

A scholar of Vladimir Nabokov, Ivan Bunin, Jewish-Russian literature, Russian Jewry, and Soviet literature, and a cultural historian of the Shoah, Shrayer has published extensively on émigré culture and various aspects of multilingual and multicultural identities in 19th- and 20th-century literature.

His book Russian Poet-Soviet Jew (2000) was the first study focused on Jewish literary identity in the early Soviet decades. With his father, David Shrayer-Petrov, Shrayer co-authored the first book about the avant-garde poet Genrikh Sapgir. Shrayer's Russian-language study, Bunin i Nabokov: Istoriia sopernichestva (Bunin and Nabokov. A History of Rivalry), has been a best-seller in Russia and has gone through four editions.

For the two-volume Anthology of Jewish-Russian Literature: Two Centuries of a Dual Identity in Prose and Poetry, 1801-2001, which showcases over 130 authors, Shrayer received the National Jewish Book Award in the Eastern European Studies category in 2007. In 2018 he published another anthology, Voices of Jewish-Russian Literature, to feature over 80 authors.

In 2012 Shrayer was awarded a Guggenheim Fellowship for his research on Jewish poets and witnesses to the Shoah, a topic he investigated in his book I SAW IT: Ilya Selvinsky and the Legacy of Bearing Witness to the Shoah (2013) and in articles.

His book With or Without it: The Prospect for Russia's Jews, examines Russia's dwindling yet still vibrant Jewish community.

== Literary career ==
Unlike most representatives of the so-called "new wave" of Russian-American writing, Shrayer had written and published poetry and prose extensively in his native Russian prior to having made a transition to writing prose predominantly in English and poetry in both languages. He continues to write verse and literary prose in both languages, and to co-author translations of his English-language works into Russian. His career has been described as one of a "translingual" writer.

Shrayer began to write poetry and prose in his native Russian at the age of eighteen and subsequently contributed it to Russian-language magazines abroad and in the former USSR. His Russian-language poetry has been gathered in four collections. At Brown University, he majored in comparative literature and literary translation, and studied fiction writing with John Hawkes. Around 1995, the year he received a Ph.D. in Russian literature from Yale University, Shrayer switched to creative prose mainly in English. His stories, essays and memoirs, have since appeared in American, Canadian, and British magazines, among them Agni, Kenyon Review, Southwest Review, and Tablet Magazine. His works have been translated into Russian, Japanese, German, French, Croatian, Italian, Chinese, Slovak and other languages. He quickly transitioned to writing prose in English, but it took him over thirty years to write his first book of poetry in English.

Shrayer's literary memoir Waiting for America: A Story of Emigration appeared in 2007 as the first literary book in the English language to capture the experience of Soviet Jewish emigres and former refuseniks waiting in Italy en route to the New World. Sam Coale wrote in The Providence Journal that "[t]he glory of this book lies in Shrayer's sinuous, neo-Proustian prose, beautifully fluid and perceptive with its luminous shocks of recognition, landscapes, descriptions and asides…Tales and teller mesmerize and delight."

Shrayer's Leaving Russia: A Jewish Story, chronologically a prequel to Waiting for America, came out in 2013 and was a finalist in the National Jewish Book Awards. It depicts the experience of growing up Jewish in the Soviet Union and the struggle of refuseniks for emigration. Annette Gendler wrote in Jewish Book World that "Maxim D. Shrayer's stunning memoir … is an engaging story of growing up as the son of Jewish intellectuals in Moscow who applied for emigration when he was ten to give him a future as a Jew. … Leaving Russia should be assigned reading for anyone interested in the Jewish experience of the twentieth century."

Shrayer's collection of stories Yom Kippur in Amsterdam was published in 2009. Leah Strauss wrote in Booklist: "This intricate, thoughtful collection explores the inexorable complexities of relationships and religion…Shrayer's eight delicate stories trace his characters' diverse struggles against the limits of tradition and culture."

Shrayer's literary exploration of the lives of Russian immigrants continued with A Russian Immigrant: Three Novellas. With this book, he reaffirmed his commitment to writing about the lives of Russian (Soviet) Jews abroad. Debra Lawless wrote, "Shrayer poses many profound questions about what it means to be an immigrant carrying 'the baggage of memory' in his new book A Russian Immigrant: Three Novellas."

In 2020, Shrayer, initially as a response to the election-year politics, and later to COVID-19, wrote a series of poems in English, which appeared as a book, Of Politics and Pandemics: Songs of a Russian Immigrant. The voice of the book stems in part from the voice of Shrayer's A Russian Immigrant: Three Novellas. Critic and Reed College Professor Marat Grinberg wrote of the collection: "'A Russian Immigrant' writing in English because it is 'a survival instinct,' since his 'audience is here,' both offers his American readers a rich lesson in Russian poetry and reminds them that traditional form does not preclude inventiveness and boldness of opinions."

Since 2020, Shrayer's poetic output in English has increased, resulting in publications in periodicals and in the 2024 publication of his second English-language collection, Kindred. According to the publisher, Finishing Line Press, the book "weaves together some of the principal themes in modern Jewish history: ancestry in Eastern Europe, the Shoah, antisemitism, exile, displacement and immigration, Zionism and Israel." Poet and translator Boris Dralyuk said, "Maxim D. Shrayer's new collection radiates the sad airy warmth of a home lost but never forgotten. There is a gentle, inviting glow to the poems, though the light they shed often lands on tragedy. With Kinship, Shrayer has expanded his place in the pantheon of émigré poets."

In 2025, Ben Yehuda Press released Zion Square, Shrayer's third collection of English-language poetry. In a conversation with the book critic Deborah Kalb, Shrayer stated, "October 7 is the collection's tuning fork, and it would be fair to describe Zion Square as a meditation on writing about wars while living between languages and cultures." The poet David Biespiel said, "with a stubborn belief that poetry must be healing, Shrayer writes poems that break through boundaries and fears, accept defeat, and yearn for pleasure."

According to Shrayer, the onset of the COVID-19 pandemic and the isolation led to the creation of his literary memoir Immigrant Baggage: Morticians, Purloined Diaries, and Other Theatrics of Exile (2023), which he had completed prior to Russia's invasion of Ukraine in February 2022. Critic and Stanley Kubrick biographer David Mikics described it as a "compact, pang-filled, hilarious marvel," whereas the writer David Samuels, literary editor of Tablet, in which sections of the book originally appeared, wrote that "Shrayer has the sharp humor of a Russian literary outsider, the longings of a Jewish emigre, and the artistic discipline to examine his experiences without sentiment or shtick. Nabokov would have read this book with pleasure."

== Books ==
Nonfiction and fiction in English:

- Immigrant Baggage: Morticians, Purloined Diaries, and Other Theatrics of Exile. Boston: Cherry Orchard Books, 2023. Russian-language version Багаж иммигранта. Israel: Sefer Kniga, 2024.
- A Russian Immigrant: Three Novellas. Boston: Cherry Orchard Books, 2019. Italian translation: Immigrato russo: tre novelle (Rome: WriteUp, 2024).
- Soviet Phantoms Vacation in Chile. A Family Chronicle [eBook]. Brookline: Ladispoli Books, 2019.
- With or Without You: The Prospect for Jews in Today's Russia. Boston: Academic Studies Press, 2017.
- Leaving Russia: A Jewish Story. Syracuse: Syracuse University Press, 2013. Russian translation Бегство: Документальный роман (Moscow: Tri kvadrata, 2019). Italian translation Fuga dalla Russia. Una storia ebraica (Pisa: Pisa University Press, 2020).
- Yom Kippur in Amsterdam: Stories. Syracuse: Syracuse University Press, 2009. Expanded Russian translation Исчезновение Залмана (Moscow: Knizhniki, 2017).
- Waiting for America: A Story of Emigration. Syracuse: Syracuse University Press, 2007. Russian translation "В ожидании Америки: Документальный роман" (Moscow: Al'pina Non-fikshn, 2013; 2nd ed. 2016; 3rd ed. 2021). Italian translation Aspettando America (Pisa: Pisa University Press, 2017).

Poetry with Russian and English translingual texts:

- Параллельное письмо/Parallel Letters. Zug, Switzerland: Sandermoen Publishing, 2025.

Poetry in English:

- Zion Square. Teaneck, NJ: Ben Yehuda Press, 2025.
- Kinship. Georgetown, KY: Finishing Lune Press, 2024.
- Of Politics and Pandemics: Songs of a Russian Immigrant. Boston: M-Graphics Publishing, 2020.

Poetry in Russian:

- Кролик по имени Макс (A Rabbit Named Max). Boston: Ladispoli Books, 2026.
- Войнa: Стихотворения 2023-2024 (War: Poems of 2023-2024). Tel Aviv: Babel Bookstore and Publishing, 2025.
- Стихи из айпада (Poems from the iPad). Tel Aviv: Babel Bookstore and Publishing, 2022.
- Американский романс (American Romance). Moscow: Russlit, 1994.
- Ньюхейвенские сонеты (New Haven Sonnets). Providence, RI: APKA Publishers, 1998.
- Табун над лугом (A Herd above the Meadow). New York: Gnosis Press, 1990.

Selected books of criticism and biography:

- Nabokov e o Judaísmo: História e Memória antes e depois do Holocausto). São Paulo: Editora Recriar, 2023.
- Антисемитизм и упадок русской деревенской школы: Астафьев, Белов, Распутин (Antisemitism and the Decline of Russian Village Prose: Astafiev, Belov, Rasputin). St. Petersburg: Academic Studies Press/BiblioRosica, 2020.
- Бунин и Набоков: История соперничества (Bunin and Nabokov. A History of Rivalry). Moscow: Alpina Non-fikshn, 2014; 2nd. ed. 2015; 3rd, expanded ed. 2019; 4th, expanded ed. 2023 Бунин и Набоков: ученичество — мастерство — соперничество. 1917-1977 (Bunin and Nabokov: Disciplehood—Mastery—Rivalry) [in Russian]. Slovak translation, 2016; Chinese translation, 2016.
- I SAW IT: Ilya Selvinsky and the Legacy of Bearing Witness to the Shoah. Boston: Academic Studies Press, 2013.
- Genrikh Sapgir: Avant-garde Classic (with David Shrayer-Petrov). St. Petersburg: Dmitrij Bulanin, 2004 [in Russian]. 2nd., corrected edition St. Petersburg: Bibliorossica, 2016. 3rd, corrected edition. Ekaterinburg: Izdatel'skie resheniia; Ridero, 2017.
- Nabokov: Themes and Variations. St. Petersburg: Academic Project, 2000 [in Russian].
- Russian Poet/Soviet Jew: The Legacy of Eduard Bagritskii. Lanham, MA and London: Rowman & Littlefield, 2000.
- The World of Nabokov's Stories. Austin, TX: University of Texas Press, 1998.

Anthologies:

- An Anthology of Jewish-Russian Literature: Two Centuries of Dual Identity in Prose and Poetry, 1801-2001. 2 vols. Armonk, NY: M. E. Sharpe, 2007.
- Voices of Jewish-Russian Literature. An Anthology. Boston: Academic Studies Press, 2018.

Edited volumes:

- Nabokov on the Heights: New Studies from Boston College. Edited by Maxim D. Shrayer. Boston: Academic Studies Press, 2025.
- Studies in the History of Russian-Israeli Literature. Edited by Roman Katsman and Maxim D. Shrayer. Boston: Academic Studies Press, 2023.
- Ocherki po istorii russko-izrail'skoi literatury. Edited by Roman Katsman and Maxim D. Shrayer. Boston: Academic Studies Press, 2023.
- The Parallel Universes of David Shrayer-Petrov. A Collection Published on the Occasion of the Writer's 85th Birthday. Edited by Roman Katsman, Maxim D. Shrayer, Klavdia Smola. Boston: Academic Studies Press, 2021.
- Parallel'nye vselennye Davida Shraera-Petrova. Sbornik statei i materialov k 85-letiiu pisatelia. Edited by Roman Katsman, Maxim D. Shrayer, Klavdia Smola. St. Petersbug: Academic Studies Press/Bibliorossica, 2021.

== Selected interviews ==
- "Growing Up Refusenik: A Q&A with Maxim D. Shrayer on his new memoir" Lea Zeltserman. Words on the Soviet-Jewish Immigration 12 December 2013
- "Interview with author Maxim D. Shrayer" Boston Bibliophile 26 May 2010
- "Pisat' po-angliiski ili po-russki, eto i sud'ba, i vybor" ("To write in Russian or in English is both a choice and a destiny") Runyweb 29 July 2011
- Maxim D. Shrayer in the Encyclopedia of Russian America 2011

== Selected news features ==
- "Son of Refuseniks Chronicles the Slow Dissolve of Russia's Jews" Jewish Telegraphic Agency 16 January 2018
- "American Productivity, The Boston Globe April 2008
- "Tales of a Totalitarian State: Newton Author Helps Chronicle Soviet Union Life" The Boston Globe 6 August 2006
- "Destiny: A Poet Writes in His Father's Words" Boston College Magazine Fall 2003
- "In Other Words: The Translator's Double Life" Boston College Magazine Spring 2002
