= Ilana Pardes =

Biblical scholar

- אילנה פרדס
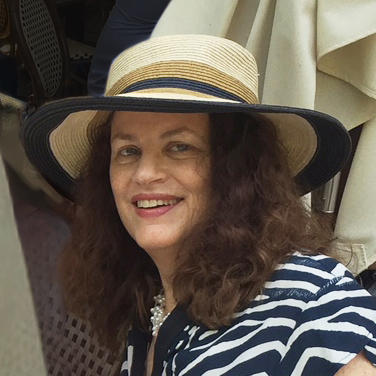
- Born: 1956 (age 69–70)
- Education: University of California, Berkeley

Ilana Pardes (Hebrew: אילנה פרדס; born 1956) is a biblical scholar. She is Katharine Cornell Professor of Comparative Literature at the Hebrew University of Jerusalem.

Pardes attended the University of California, Berkeley, where she studied under Robert Alter. She received her Ph.D. in Comparative Literature in 1990, and taught at Princeton University from 1990 to 1992. She has been at the Hebrew University since then.

In 2022, she was elected a member of the Academia Europaea.

== Books ==
- Countertraditions in the Bible: A Feminist Approach (Harvard University Press, 1992)
- The Biography of Ancient Israel: National Narratives in the Bible (University of California Press, 2000)
- Melville's Bibles (University of California, 2008)
- Agnon's Moonstruck Lovers: The Song of Songs in Israeli Culture (The Samuel and Althea Stroum Lectures in Jewish Studies, University of Washington Press, 2013)
- The Song of Songs: A Biography (Princeton University Press, 2019)
- Ruth: A Migrant’s Tale (Yale University Press, 2022).
- Ilana Pardes and Itamar Lurie, Joseph and His Dreams: Bible, Literature, Psychoanalysis (Bialik Institute, 2023)
