= David Shrayer-Petrov =

Russian American novelist, poet, and memoirist (1936–2024)

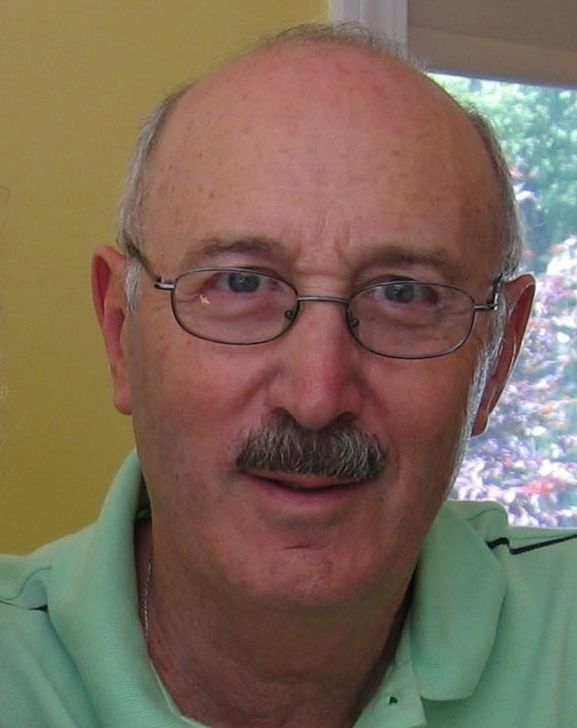
- Shrayer-Petrov in 2006
- Born: David Peisakhovich Shrayer; 28 January 1936; Leningrad, Russian SFSR, USSR
- Died: 9 June 2024 (aged 88); Boston, Massachusetts, U.S.
- Citizenship: United States
- Education: Leningrad First Medical School
- Occupations: Author, translator, medical researcher
- Spouse: Emilia Shrayer

David Peisakhovich Shrayer-Petrov (Russian: Давид Пейсахович <Петрович> Шраер-Петров; 28 January 1936 – 9 June 2024) was a Russian-American novelist, poet, memoirist, translator, and medical scientist best known for his novel about refuseniks, Doctor Levitin, his poetry and fiction about Russian Jewish identity and his memoirs about the Soviet literary scene in the late 1950s-1970s.

== Biography ==
Shrayer-Petrov was born of Jewish parents in Leningrad. Both of Shrayer-Petrov's parents, Petr (Peysakh) Shrayer and Bella Breydo, moved from the former Pale of Settlement to Leningrad (St. Petersburg) in the 1920s to attend college. Shrayer-Petrov spent his early prewar years in Leningrad and was evacuated from the besieged city to a village in the Ural Mountains. The future writer and his mother returned to Leningrad in the summer of 1944, his father serving as a captain, and, subsequently, a major, in a tank brigade, and, subsequently, a lieutenant commander in the Baltic Fleet.

In 1959, Shrayer-Petrov graduated from Leningrad First Medical School and subsequently served in the army as a physician. In 1966 he received a Ph.D. from the Leningrad Institute of Tuberculosis. He married Emilia Polyak (Shrayer) in 1962, and their son Maxim D. Shrayer was born in 1967, already after the family had moved from Leningrad to Moscow. From 1967 to 1978 Shrayer-Petrov worked as a researcher at the Gamaleya Research Institute of Epidemiology and Microbiology in Moscow until he was fired from a senior research position after applying for an exit visa. In 1979-1987 Shrayer-Petrov and his family were refuseniks and endured persecution by the Soviet authorities.

Shrayer-Petrov entered the literary scene as a poet and translator in the late 1950s. Upon the suggestion of Boris Slutsky, the poet adopted the pen name David Petrov. This assimilatory gesture did not simplify the publication of Shrayer-Petrov's poetry in the Soviet Union. Most of his writings were too controversial for Soviet officialdom and remained in the writer's desk drawer or circulated in samizdat. Shrayer-Petrov's first collection of verse, Canvasses, did not appear until 1967. With great difficulty Shrayer-Petrov was admitted to the Union of Soviet Writers in 1976, upon the recommendation of Viktor Shklovsky, Lev Ozerov and Andrei Voznesensky. His poem “My Slavic Soul” brought repressive measures against the author. A Jewish refusenik expelled from the Union of Soviet Writers, Shrayer-Petrov was unable to publish in the USSR; galleys of two of his books were broken in retaliation for his decision to emigrate. In spite of bullying and arrests by the KGB, Shrayer-Petrov's last Soviet decade was productive; he wrote two novels, several plays, a memoir, and many stories and verses. He was granted permission to emigrate in 1987. Shrayer-Petrov's best-known novel, Doctor Levitin (known in Russian as Herbert and Nelly), was the first to depict the exodus of Soviet Jews and the life of refuseniks in limbo. Since the publication of its first part in Israel in 1986, Herbert and Nelly has gone through three editions, most recently in 2014 in Moscow. Its English translation appeared in 2018. After a summer in Italy, in August 1987 Shrayer-Petrov and his family arrived in Providence, RI, the home of David Shrayer-Petrov and Emilia Shrayer for the next twenty years. In Providence he worked as a medical researcher at Brown University-Roger Williams Hospital (Dr. Shrayer published almost 100 scientific articles in microbiology and immunology). Emigration brought forth a stream of new literary works and publications. The writer and his wife resided until his death in Brookline, MA, where Shrayer-Petrov devoted himself to writing full-time.

Shrayer-Petrov died from complications associated with Parkinson's disease in Boston, on 9 June 2024, at the age of 88.

The works of David Shrayer-Petrov have been translated into English, Belarusian, Croatian, French, Hebrew, Japanese, Georgian, Lithuanian, Macedonian, Polish, and other languages.

Shrayer's first cousin is the Israeli visual artist David Sharir (Hebrew: דוד שריר).

== Books in English translation ==
- Doctor Levitin. A Novel. 2018, Detroit, Wayne State University Press.
- Dinner with Stalin and Other Stories. 2014, Syracuse, NY. Runner-up for the 2014 Edward Lewis Wallant Award.
- Autumn in Yalta: A Novel and Three Stories, 2006, Syracuse, NY.
- Jonah and Sarah: Jewish Stories of Russia and America, 2003, Syracuse, NY.

== Books in Russian ==
=== Poetry collections ===
- Winter Ship: Shorter and Longer Poems 1968-1979 (Zimnii korabl': Stikhotvoreniia i poemy 1968–1979), 2026, New York, NY, USA.
- Village Orchestra (Derevenskii orkestr), six long poems, 2016, St. Petersburg, Russia.
- Nevan Poems (Nevskie stithi), poetry, 2011, St. Petersburg, Russia.
- Lines-Figures-Bodies: A Book of Poems (Linii-figury-tela: king stikhotvorenii), poetry, 2010, St. Petersburg, Russia.
- Two Books: Poems (Dve knigi: stikhi, poetry, 2009, Philadelphia, USA.
- Form of Love (Forma liubvi), poetry, 2003, Moscow, Russia.
- Drums of Fortune (Barabany sud'by), poetry, 2002, Moscow, Russia.
- Petersburg Doge (Piterskii dozh), poetry, 1999, St. Petersburg, Russia.
- Lost Soul (Propashchaia dusha), poetry, 1997, Providence, RI, USA.
- Villa Borghese (Villa Borgeze), poetry, 1992, Holyoke, MA, USA.
- Song about a Blue Elephant (Pesnia o golubom slone), poetry, 1990, Holyoke, MA, USA.
- Canvases (Kholsty; in the collective Pereklichka), poetry, 1967, Moscow, Russia.

=== Fiction ===
- Judin's Redemption (Iskuplenie Iudina), novel, 2021, Moscow, Russia.
- Round-the-Globe-Happiness (Krugosvetnoe shchast'e), stories, 2017, Moscow, Russia.
- The Story of My Beloved, or The Spiral Staircase (Istoriia moei vozliublennoi, ii Vintovaia lestnitsa), novel, 2013, Moscow, Russia.
- The Third Life (Tret'ia zhizn'), novel, 2010, Lugansk, Ukraine.
- Carp for the Gefilte Fish (Karp dlia farshirovannoi ruby), stories, 2005, Moscow, Russia.
- These Strange Russian Jews (Eti strannye russkie evrei), two novels, 2004, Moscow, Russia.
- The Tostemaa Castle (Zamok Tystemaa), novel, 2001, Tallinn, Estonia.
- The French Cottage (Frantsuzskii kottedzh), novel, 1999, Providence, RI, USA.
- Herbert and Nelly (Gerbert i Nelli), novel, 1992, Moscow; 2nd ed. 2006, St. Petersburg, Russia; 3rd ed. 2014, Moscow, Russia.

=== Novels published serially but not in book form ===
- Model of Life (Model' zhizni), novel, 2009-2010 (Mosty).
- Judin's Redemption (Iskuplenie Iudina), novel, 2005-2006 (Mosty).
- The Kissing Game (Igra v butylochku), novel, 2018-2020 (Slovo/Word).

=== Non-fiction ===
- Hunt for the Red Devil: A Novel with Microbiologists (Okhota na ryzhego d'iavola: Roman s mikrobiologami), memoir, 2010, Moscow, Russia.
- Vodka and Pastries: A Novel with Writers (Vodka s pirozhnymi: Roman s pisateliami), memoir-novel, 2007, St. Petersburg, Russia.
- Genrikh Sapgir: Avant-Garde Classic (Genrikh Sapgir: Classic avangarda), criticism and biography, with Maxim D. Shrayer, criticism, 2004, St. Petersburg, Russia. 2nd., corrected edition St. Petersburg: Bibliorossica, 2016. 3rd, corrected edition. Ekaterinburg: Izdatel'skie resheniia; Ridero, 2017.
- Gold-Domed Moscow (Moskva zlatoglavaia), memoir-novel, 1994, Baltimore, MD, USA.
- Friends and Shadows (Druz'ia i teni), memoir-novel, 1989, New York, NY, USA.
- Poetry of Labor Heroizm (Poeziia o trudovom geroizme), essays, 1977, Moscow, Russia.
- Poetry and Science (Poeziia i nauka), essays, 1974, Moscow, Russia.

=== Drama ===
- Vaccine. Ed Tenner (Vaktsina. Ed Tenner), tragicomedy in verse, 2021, Moscow, Russia.

=== Edited by ===
- Genrikh Sapgir, Shorter and Longer Poems, co-edited with Maxim D. Shrayer, 2004, St. Petersburg, Russia.

== Sources ==
- David Shrayer-Petrov in "Encyclopedia of Russian America"
- David Shrayer-Petrov and Maxim D. Shrayer, "Dinner with Stalin: Parts 1-3," Jewish Book Council July 2014
- David Reich, "Destiny: A Poet Writes in His Father's Voice," Boston College Magazine, Fall 2003
- David Mehegan, "Russia to Rhode Island," Off the Shelf/The Boston Globe, February 8, 2008
- Alice Nakhimovsky, "Russian Literature," "The YIVO Encyclopedia of Jews in Eastern Europe"
- David Shrayer-Petrov reads from and discusses his works at Bar-Ilan University (2012)
- David Shrayer-Petrov(1936-2024) Obituary
