= The Jerusalem International Writers Festival =

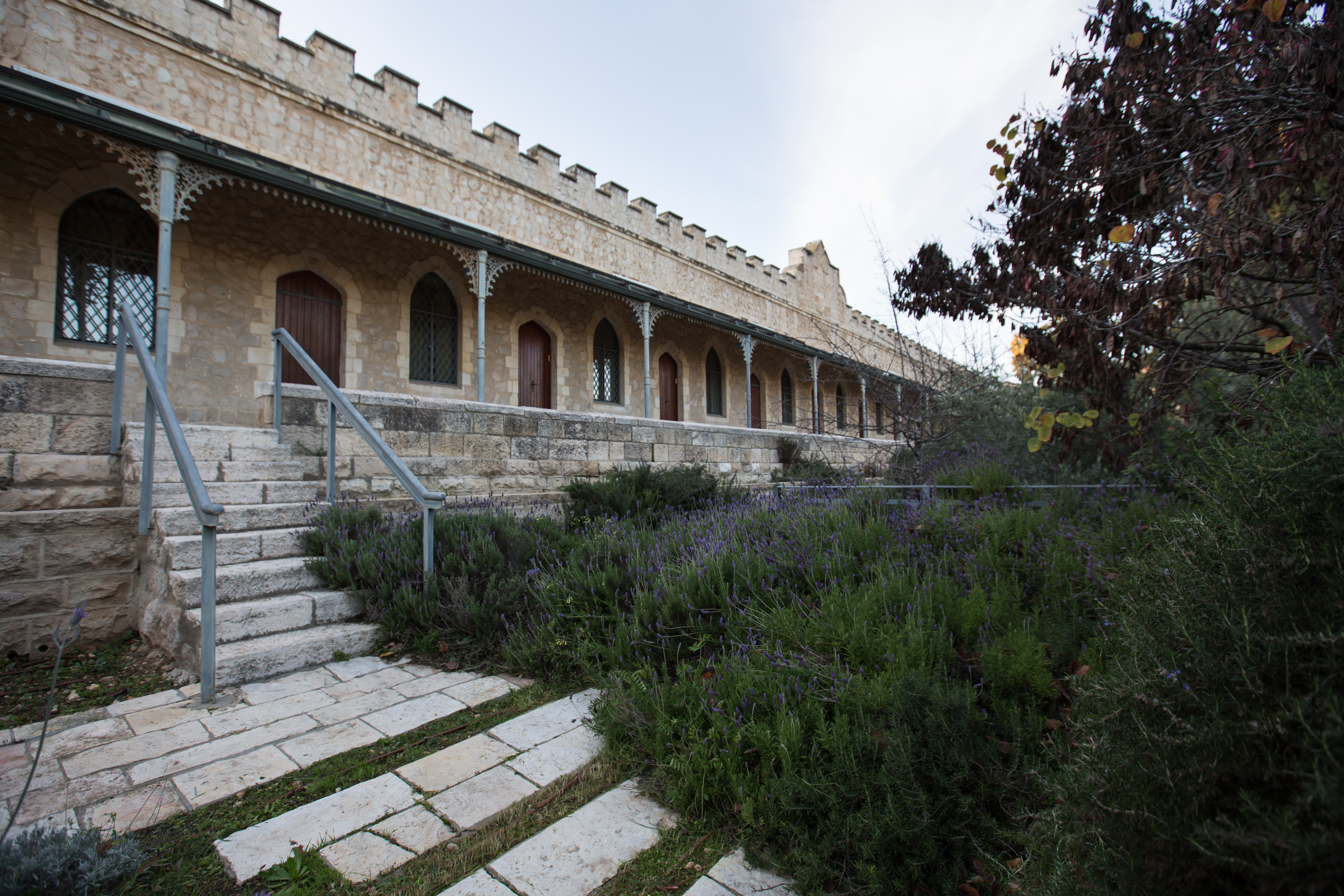
Venue of International Writers Festival, Mishkenot Sha'ananim, Jerusalem

The Jerusalem International Writers Festival is an annual festival that takes place at the Mishkenot Sha'ananim Cultural Center in Jerusalem, Israel. Since the Mishkenot Sha'ananim guesthouse opened in 1974, literature has been one of its main focuses. The Jerusalem International Writers Festival was first held in 2008 and was a biennial event until 2018, when it was decided to hold it on a yearly basis.

Each year, it features forty writers from Israel and other countries who take part in events on the Mishkenot campus and other locations in the city. The festival has been organized by Moti Schwartz since 2014.

== History ==
The Mishkenot Sha'ananim conference center, founded by The Jerusalem Foundation and situated across from the walls of the Old City of Jerusalem, is an international cultural institution and conference center for writers, artists, and scholars.

The center has hosted writers and literary events with guests specializing in music, film, theater, museums, architecture, and other cultural realms. Their programs try to focus on dialogue, tolerance, and diversity. The platform provides a forum for individuals to participate in cultural interaction in an inclusive setting.

Mishkenot's residency programs, some of which operate in the framework of the International Writers Festival, host artists who spend significant periods of time at the center and draw inspiration from it. For example, in the mid-1970s, Saul Bellow visited Israel and was the guest of Mishkenot. The author studied Israeli landscape and culture, gathering insights from individuals with diverse perspectives. He documented the opinions, passions, and dreams of many individuals, including Prime Minister Yitzhak Rabin and novelist Amos Oz among others. The resulting book, To Jerusalem and Back, provides an account of his experiences.

== 2022 ==
Featuring Writers: A. B. Yehoshua (IL), Meira Barnea-Goldberg (IL), Julian Barnes (UK), Illa Ben Porat (IL), Tamar Blumenfeld (IL), Yochi Brandes (IL), Oded Carmeli (IL), Amichai Chasson (IL), Joshua Cohen (US), Ron Dahan (IL), Jason Danino-Holt (IL), Ruth Elbaz (IL), Julia Fermentto Tzaisler (IL), Jonathan Franzen (US), Giovana Giordano (IT), Nechama Gross (IL), Netalie Gvirtz (IL), Tafat Hacohen-Bick (IL), Nadav Halperin (IL), Yuval Noah Harari (IL), Roy Hasan (IL), Yaakov Herskovitz (IL), Alon Hilu (IL), Noa Katz (IL), Rita Kogan (IL), Christian Kracht (CH), Hervé Le Tellier (FR), Danny Luzon (IL), Dror Mishani (IL), Rutu Modan (IL), Amir Naaman (IL), Véronique Olmi (FR), Galia Oz (IL), Noam Partom (IL), Shani Pocker (IL), Dorit Rabinyan (IL), Odeya Rosenak (IL), Rivki Rosner (IL), Meir Shalev (IL), Dorit Shiloh (IL), Nissan Shor (IL), Peter Singer (AU), Yaron Sivan (IL), Joshua Sobol (IL), Ronny Someck (IL), Noa Sorek (IL), Olga Tokarczuk (PL), Zohar Weiman-Kelman (IL), Oded Wolkstein (IL), Noa Yedlin (IL), Oxana Zabuzhko (UA).

== 2021 ==
Due to the COVID-19 pandemic, the ninth International Writers Festival in Jerusalem was held in a hybrid format.

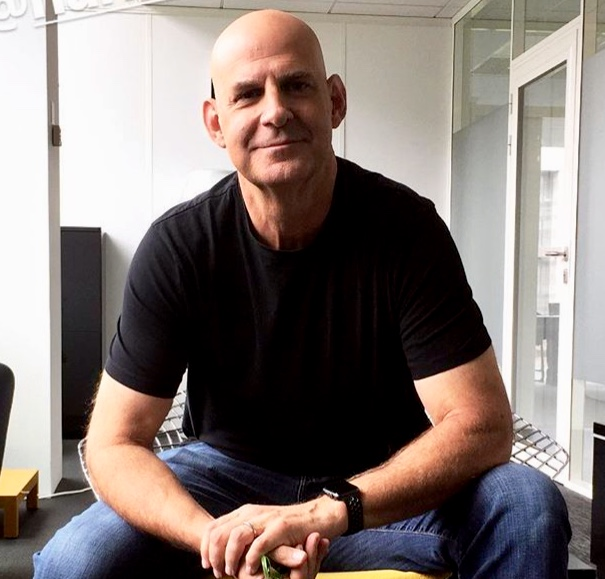
Harlan Coben

Featuring Writers: Yair Agmon (IL), Maya Arad (USA), Yiftach Ashkenazi (IL), Ehud Banai (IL), Amichai Chasson (IL), Harlan Coben (USA), Shifra Cornfeld (IL), Avni Doshi (USA/AE), Iris Eliya-Cohen (IL), Julia Fermentto Tzaisler (IL), Michal Govrin (IL), David Grossman (IL), Sheikha Haliva (IL), Yaniv Iczkovits (IL), Etgar Keret (IL), Lihi Lapid (IL), Noa Menhaim (IL), Dror Mishani (IL), Agi Mishol (IL), Marcel Moseri (IL), Emmanuel Moses (FR), Eshkol Nevo (IL), Goel Pinto (IL), Salman Rushdie (UK/USA), Jonathan Safran Foer (USA), Yonatan Sagiv (IL), Meir Shalev (IL), Zeruya Shalev (IL), Sarai Shavit (IL), Yaara Shehori (IL), Shoham Smith (IL), Ronny Somek (IL), Vanessa Springora (FR), Domenico Starnone (IT), Ayelet Tsabari (IL), Linn Ullman (NO).

== 2020 (Digital Edition) ==
Due to the COVID-19 pandemic, the Festival took place in a digital format.

Featuring Writers: Dan Ariely (Prof.) (IL), Marco Balzano (IT), Gon Ben Ari (IL), Ilana Bernstein (IL), Anat Einhar (IL), Eli Eliahu (IL), Evan Fallenberg (Prof.) (IL), Gaël Faye (FR/RW), Matti Friedman (IL), Sefy Hendler (Dr.) (IL), Liat Kaplan (IL), Adi Keissar (IL), Etgar Keret (IL), Nicole Krauss (US), Boaz Lavie (IL), Ron Leshem (IL), Noa Menhaim (IL), Dror Mishani (IL), Eshkol Nevo (IL), Tom Perrotta (US), Michael Pollan (Prof.) (US), Zeruya Shalev (IL), Sarai Shavit (IL), Leonie Swann (DE), Ayelet Tsabari (IL), Matthew Weiner (US), Rana Werbin (IL), Noa Yedlin (IL).

== 2019 ==
Featuring Writers: André Aciman (US), Ayọ̀bámi Adébáyọ̀ (NG), Yair Agmon (IL), Noga Albalach (IL), Eli Amir (IL), Nir Baram (IL), Sarah Blau (IL), Joyce Carol Oates (US), Julia Fermento (IL / US), Arik Glasner (Dr.) (IL), Michal Govrin (Prof.) (IL), Lauren Groff (US), David Grossman (IL), Ayelet Gundar-Goshen (IL), Adi Keissar (IL), Nidaa Khoury (Prof.) (IL), Lana Lux (UA/ DE), Dory Manor (Dr.) (IL), Noa Menhaim (IL), Tamar Merin (IL), Dror Mishani (IL), Orian Morris (IL), Yael Neeman (IL), Andrés Neuman (AR/ ES), Itamar Orlev (IL / DE), Fania Oz-Salzberger (Prof.) (IL), Ahmad Danny Ramadan (SY/ CA), Meir Shalev (IL), Zeruya Shalev (IL), Udi Sharabani (IL), Sjón (IS), Sharlene Teo (SG / UK), Éric Vuillard (FR).

== 2018 ==
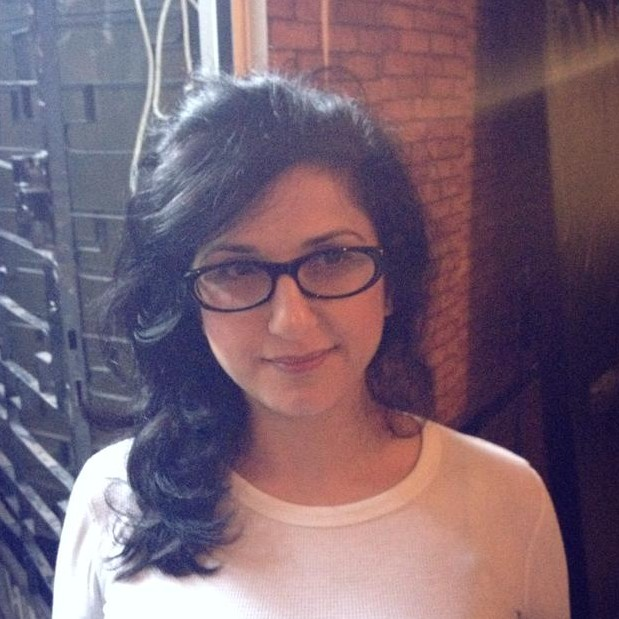
Dorit Rabinyan

Featuring Writers: Shimon Adaf (IL), Yair Agmon (IL), Maria Alyokhina (RU), Nir Baram (IL), Paul Beatty (US), Haim Be'er (IL), Gon Ben Ari (IL), Yuval Ben-Ami (IL), Michal Ben-Naftali (IL), Sarah Blau (IL), Hila Blum (IL), Olga Borisova (RU), Dror Burstein (IL), Ron Dahan (IL), Galit Dahan-Carlibach (IL), Assaf Gavron (IL), Ruth Gilligan (IE), Arik Glasner (IL), Michal Govrin (IL), Gail Hareven (IL), Nathan Hill (US), Miron H. Izakson (IL), Etgar Keret (IL), Alona Kimhi (IL), Lihi Lapid (IL), Noa Menhaim (IL), Dror Mishani (IL), Agi Mishol (IL), Eshkol Nevo (IL), Dorit Rabinyan (IL), Yishai Sarid (IL), Samanta Schweblin (AR), Francesca Segal (UK), Graeme Simsion (AU), Noa Yedlin (IL).

== 2016 ==
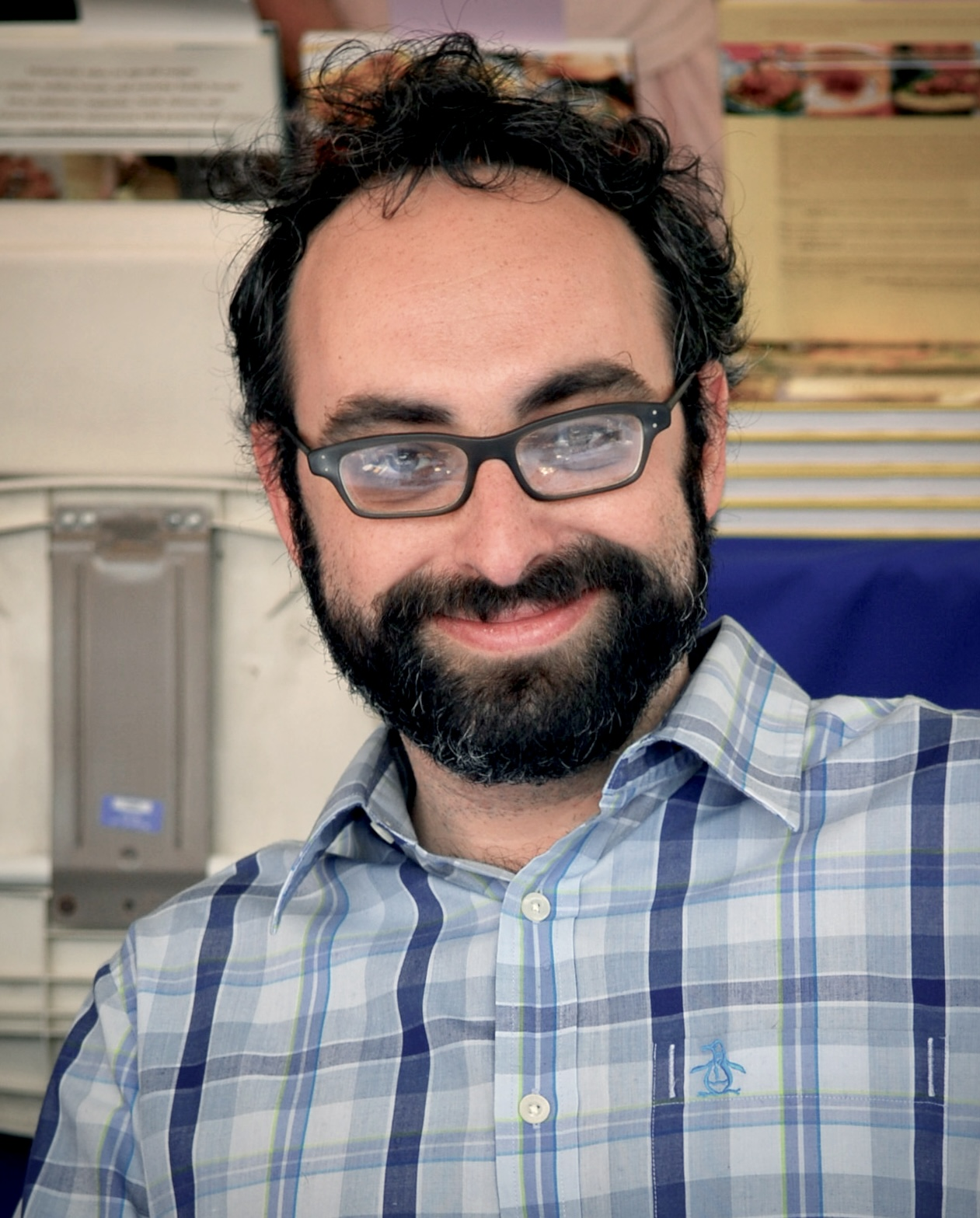
Gary Shteyngart

Featuring Writers: Shimon Adaf (IL), Noga Albalach (IL), Lila Azam Zanganeh (FR\IR), Nir Baram (IL), Sarah Blau (IL), Dror Burstein (IL), Jesus Carrasco (ES), Orly Castel Bloom (IL), Galit Dahan Carlibach (IL), Anita Desai (IN/US), Kiran Desai (/IN/US), Alex Epstein (IL), Assaf Gavron (IL), Shira Geffen (IL), Arik Glasner (IL), Michal Govrin (Prof.) (IL), David Grossman (IL), Matan Hermoni (IL), Mai Jia (CN), Dikla Keidar (IL), Etgar Keret (IL), Anthony Marra (US), Colum McCann (IE/US), Noa Menhaim (IL), Tamar Merin (IL), Sami Michael (IL), Dror Mishani (IL), Ruby Namdar (US\IL), Tal Nitzan (IL), Shelly Oria (US\IL), Leonid Pekarovsky (US), Dorit Rabinyan (IL), Yishai Sarid (IL), Asaf Schurr (IL), Meir Shalev (IL), Zeruya Shalev (IL), Yaara Shehori (IL), Ayman Sikseck (IL), Ronny Someck (IL), Gary Shteyngart (US), Juan Gabriel Vásquez (CO), Noa Yedlin (IL), Abraham B. Yehoshua (IL), Nell Zink (US/DE).

== 2014 ==
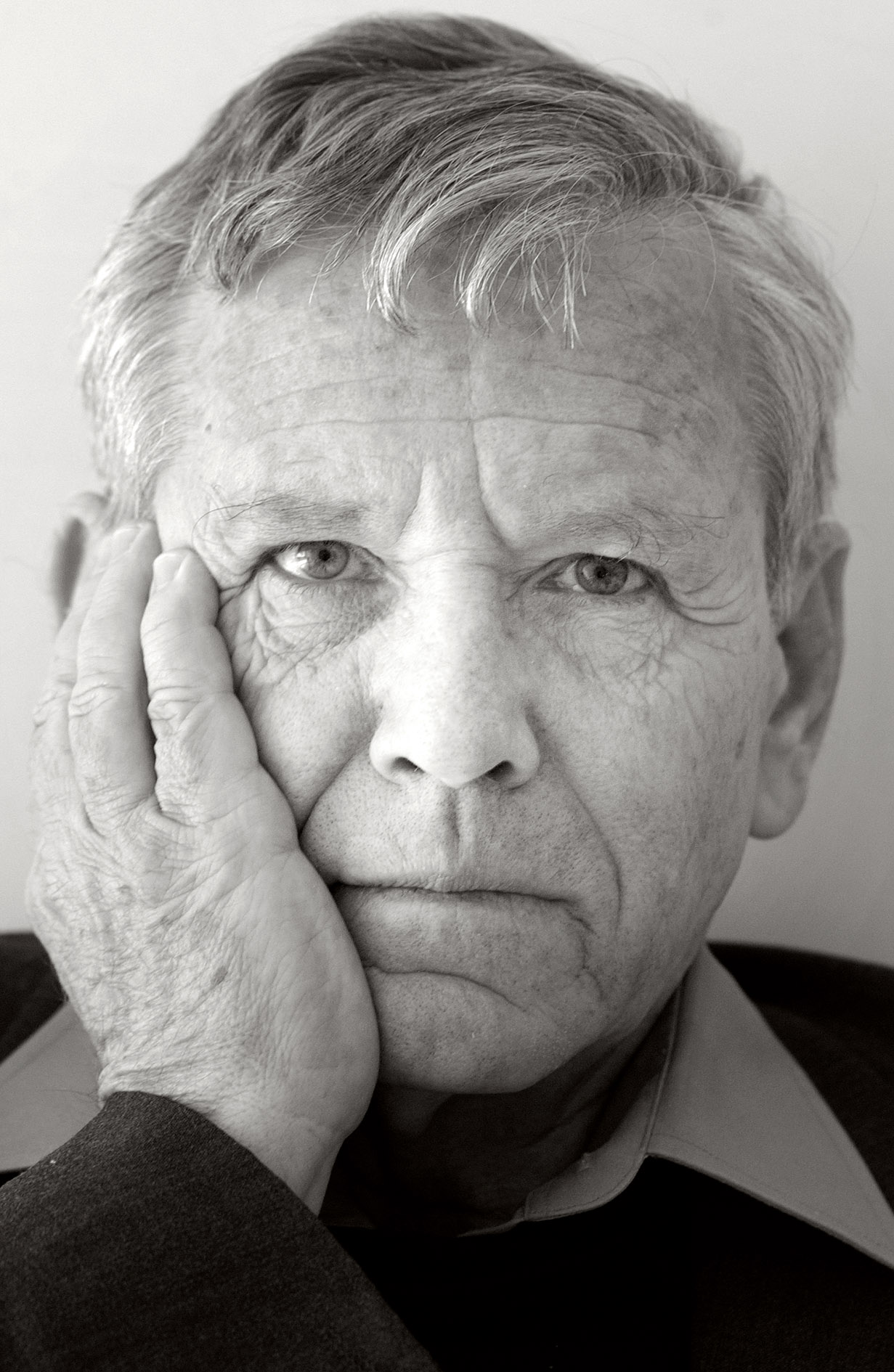
Amos Oz

Featuring Writers: Shimon Adaf (IL), Lea Aini (IL), Nir Baram (IL), Haim Be'er (IL), Oudeh Bisharat (IL), Sarah Blau (IL), Alex Epstein (IL), David Foenkinos (FR), Assaf Gavron (IL), David Grossman (IL), Ayelet Gundar-Goshen (IL), Eran Hadas (IL), Esti G. Haim (IL), Gail Hareven (IL), Matan Hermoni (IL), Assaf Inbari (IL), Miron C. Izakson (IL), Sayed Kashua (IL), Judith Katzir (IL), Etgar Keret (IL), Maria Kodama (AR), Michael Konyves (US), Lihi Lapid (IL), Nam Le (VN\AU), Ronit Matalon (IL), Dror Mishani (IL), Agi Mishol (IL), Reuven (Ruby) Namdar (US), Eshkol Nevo (IL), Krauss Nicole (US), Gabi Nitzan (IL), Amos Oz (IL), Dorit Rabinyan (IL), Laura Restrepo (CO), Marilynne Robinson (US), Judith Rotem (IL), Yishai Sarid (IL), Nava Semel (IL), Jan-Philipp Sendker (DE), Meir Shalev (IL), Jake Wallis Simons (UK), Ronny Someck (IL), Yossi Sucary (IL), Ofir Touche Gafla (IL), Ayelet Waldman(US), Noa Yedlin (IL), Abraham B. Yehoshua (IL).

== 2012 ==
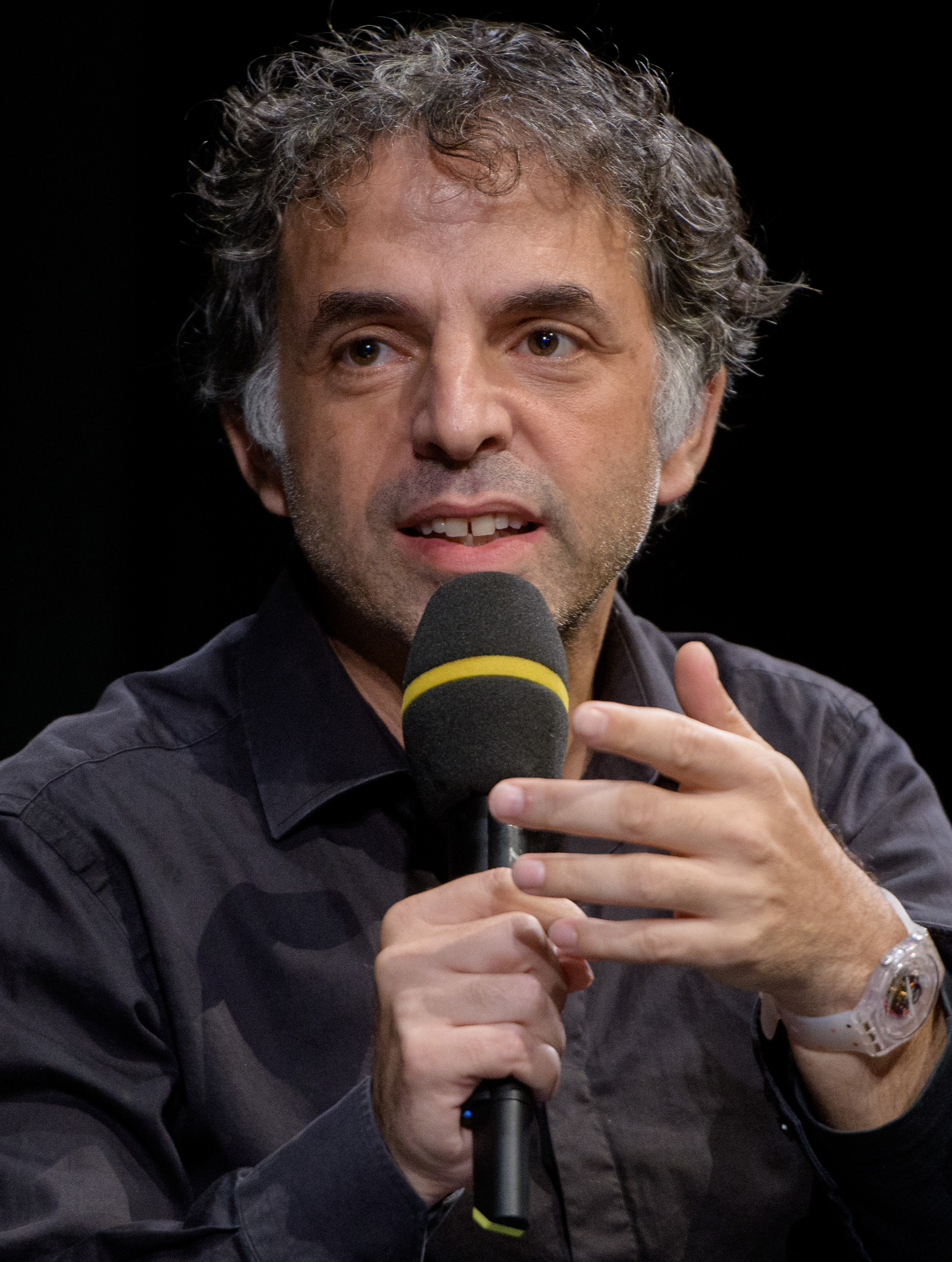
Etgar Keret

Featuring Writers: Shimon Adaf (IL), Lea Aini (IL), Eli Amir (IL), Yair Assulin (IL), Nir Baram (IL), Lukas Barfuss (SZ), Hanoch Bartov( IL), Haim Be'er (IL), Aimee Bender (US), Sami Berdugo (IL), Sarah Blau (IL), Yochi Brandes (IL), Orly Castel-Bloom (IL), Tracy Chevalier (UK), Solveig Eggerz (IS\US), Alona Frankel (IL), David Grossman (IL), Arnon Grunberg (NL), Amir Gutfreund (IL), Aleksandar Hemon (US\BA), Alon Hilu (IL), Sayed Kashua (IL), Etgar Keret (IL), Herman Koch (NL), Laszlo Krasznahorkai (HU), Haggay Linik (IL), Dory Manor (IL), Ronit Matalon (IL), Lorenza Mazzetti (IT), Dror Mishani (IL), Yael Neeman (IL), Eshkol Nevo (IL), Amos Oz (IL), Claudia Pineiro (AR), Dorit Rabinyan (IL), Tom Rob Smith (UK), Moshe Sakal (IL), Boualem Sansal (DZ), Meir Shalev (IL), Zeruya Shalev (IL), Gary Shteyngart (US), Einat Yakir (IL), Abraham B. Yehoshua (IL).

== 2010 ==
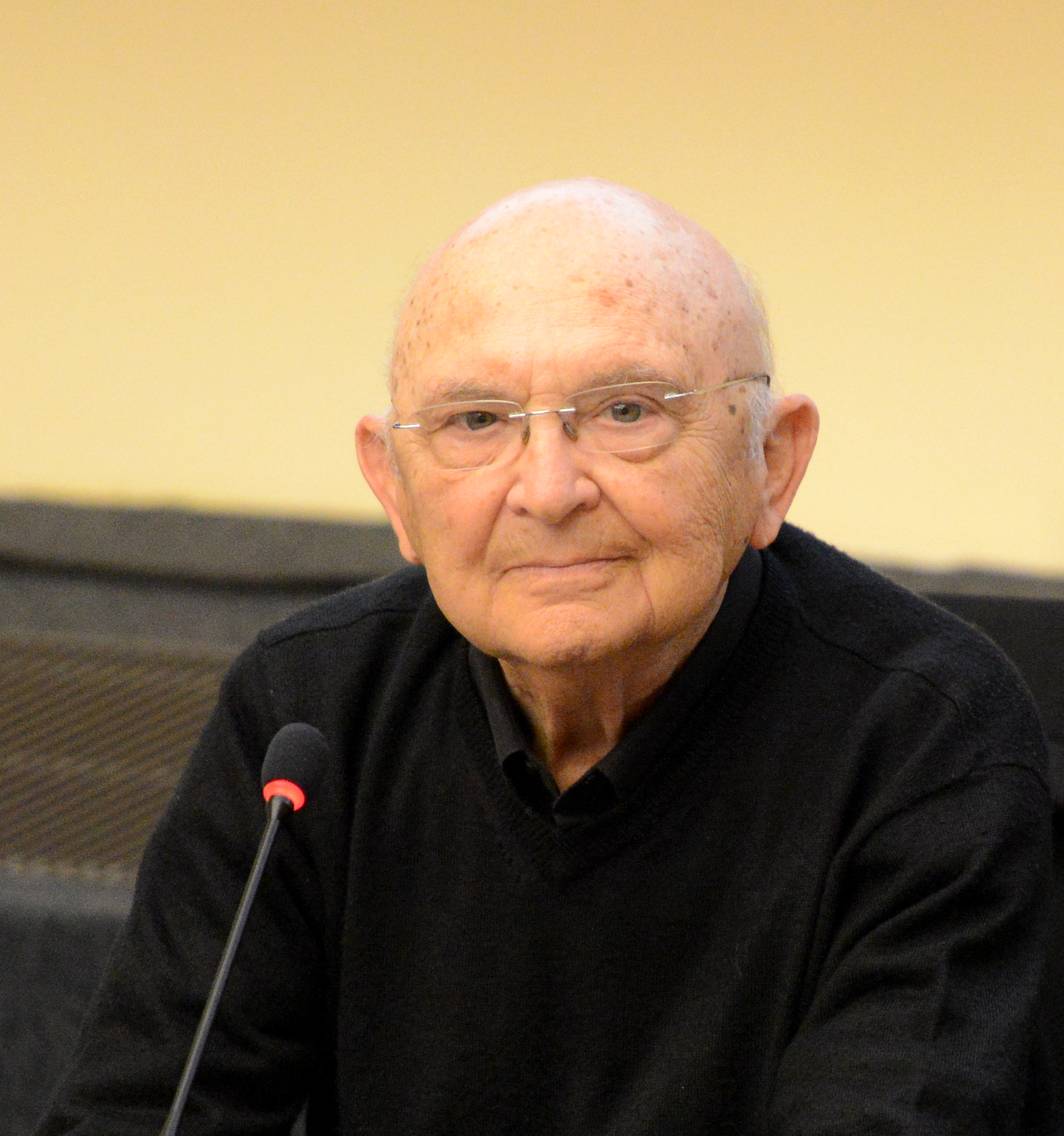
Aharon Appelfeld

Featuring Writers: Shimon Adaf (IL), Eli Amir (IL), Aharon Appelfeld (IL), Naim Araidi (IL), Paul B. Auster (US), Gabriela Avigur-Rotem (IL), Yossi Avni-Levy (IL), Russell Banks (US), Nir Baram (IL), Sarah Blau (IL), Dror Burstein (IL), Adolfo Garcia Ortega (ES), Nurit Gertz (IL), Paolo Giordano (IT), Michail Grobman (IL), David Grossman(IL), Amir Gutfreund (IL), Kathryn Harrison (US), Liliana Heker (AR), Judith Hermann (DE), Yoel Hoffman (IL), Yu Hua (CN), Siri Hustvedt (US), Sayed Kashua (IL), Judith Katzir (IL), Daniel Kehlman (DE), Etgar Keret (IL), Alona Kimhi (IL), Jamaica Kincaid (US), Nicole Krauss (US), Andrej Kurkov (UA), Ron Leshem (IL), Ayal Megged (IL), Daniel Mendelsohn(US), Eshkol Nevo (IL), Sofi Oksanen (FI), Amos Oz (IL), Michael Rips (US), Jonathan Safran Foer (US), Simon Sebag Montefiore (UK), Hussein Serag (EG), Meir Shalev (IL), Zeruya Shalev (IL), Yossi Sucary (IL), Gadi Taub (IL), Lyudmila Ulitskaya (RU), Abraham B. Yehoshua (IL).

== 2008 ==
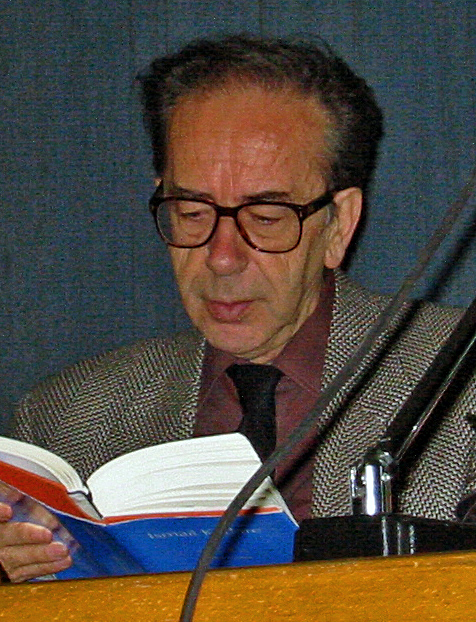
Ismail Kadare

Featuring Writers: Eli Amir (IL), Aharon Appelfeld (IL), Naim Araidi (IL), Yehuda Atlas (IL), Gabriela Avigur Rotem (IL), Haim Be'er (IL), Sarah Blau (IL), Yochi Brandes (IL), Erri De Luca (IT), Nathan Englander (US), Anita Diamant (US), Anna Enquist (NL), Avirama Golan (IL), Nadine Gordimer (ZA), David Grossman (IL), Amir Gutfreund (IL), Gail Hareven (IL), Alon Hilu (IL), Yoel Hoffman (IL), Lidia Jorge (PT), Salim Jubran (IL), Ismail Kadare (AL), Sayed Kashua (IL), Judith Katzir (IL), Etgar Keret (IL), Nicole Krauss (US), Savyon Liebrecht (IL), Gila Lustiger (FR\DE), Mira Magen (IL), Andrei Makine (FR), Guillermo Martinez (AR), Ayal Megged (IL), Noa Menhaim (IL), Sami Michael (IL), Eshkol Nevo (IL), Amos Oz (IL), Judith Rotem (IL), Jonathan Safran Foer (US), Ingo Schulze (DE), Hussein Serag (EG), Meir Shalev (IL), Zeruya Shalev (IL), Ilan Sheinfeld (IL), Hans Ulrich Treichel (DE), Niall Williams (IE), Boris Zaidman (IL).

In South Africa, Gordimer defended her decision to attend the conference, defying calls that she should boycott the event.

== Programs ==
- The festival program of 2022
- The festival program of 2021
- The festival program of 2020
- The festival program of 2019
- The festival program of 2018
- The festival program of 2016
- The festival program of 2014
- The festival program of 2012
- The festival program of 2010
- The festival program of 2008
