= Shulamith Hareven =

Israeli author and essayist

- שולמית הראבן
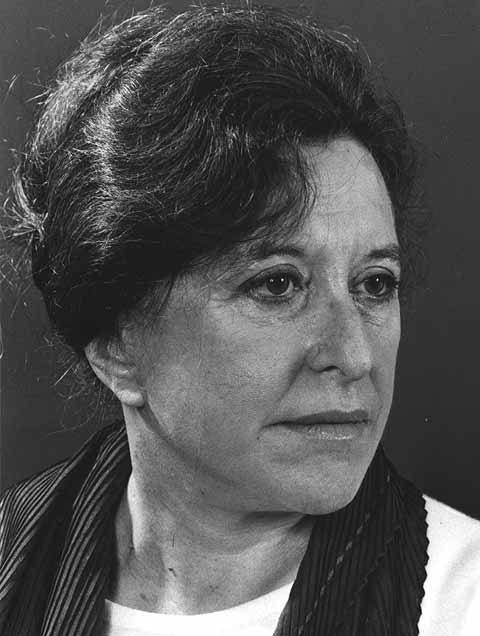
- Born: Shulamith Riftin; February 14, 1930; Warsaw, Poland
- Died: November 25, 2003 (aged 73); Jerusalem, Israel
- Occupations: Author, poet, translator, editor, essayist
- Spouse: Alouph Hareven
- Children: Gail Hareven
- Writing career
- Years active: 1950-2003

Shulamith Hareven (Hebrew: שולמית הראבן; pen name, Tal Yaeri; February 14, 1930 – November 25, 2003) was an Israeli author and essayist.

== Early life ==
She was born as Shulamith Riftin to a Zionist family. Her father, Avraham was a lawyer. They immigrated to Mandate Palestine in 1940.

== Career ==
At 17, she joined the Haganah and became a combat medic in the 1948 Arab-Israeli War; serving in the Battle for Jerusalem. Later, she was assigned to help establish Israel Defense Forces Radio; beginning the station's broadcasts in 1950. During the War of Attrition and the Yom Kippur War, she served as a war correspondent.

In 1962, she published her first book, a collection of poems titled Predatory Jerusalem. Since then, she has written prose, translations, and plays. She published essays and articles about Israeli society and culture in literary journals such as Masa, Orlogin, and Keshet, and in several newspapers, including Al Ha-Mishmar, Maariv, and Yedioth Ahronoth. Her essays have been collected in four volumes. She also published a thriller under the pen name "Tal Yaeri". Her books have been translated into 21 languages.

She was the first woman inducted into the Academy of the Hebrew Language and was an activist for Peace Now. In 1995 the French weekly L'Express deemed her an Author of Peace and listed her among the 100 women "who move the world".

== Personal life ==
Hareven protected her privacy: "I have always thought that culture begins where they know how to separate personal matters from public matters," she wrote in Hebrew in the foreword to her last book, Many Days, an Autobiography. She was married to Alouph Hareven, an intelligence officer who briefly served with Mossad. Their daughter is the writer Gail Hareven.

== Death ==
She is buried at Har HaMenuchot in Jerusalem. An archive of her materials may be found at Ben-Gurion University.

== Works translated into English ==
- City of Many Days (novel, 1977)
- The Miracle Hater (novella, 1988)
- Prophet (novella, 1990)
- Twilight and Other Stories (1991)
- Thirst: The Desert Trilogy (1996)
- The Vocabulary of Peace (essays, 1995)
