= Nili Gold =

Israeli-American Hebrew linguist (born 1948)

Nili Rachel Scharf Gold (Hebrew: נילי רחל שרף גולד; born 1948) is an Israeli-American professor of modern Hebrew language and literature in the Department of Near Eastern Languages and Civilizations at the University of Pennsylvania. Taking an interdisciplinary approach to the study of modern Hebrew literature, she draws in her research on approaches from psychoanalysis, urban history, diaspora and migration studies, and studies of collective and individual memory. She has published prize-winning books on the Israeli Hebrew poet, Yehuda Amichai, and on the cultural, social, and architectural aspects of the city of Haifa. She has promoted an awareness of modern Hebrew culture in the United States by sponsoring conferences about, and public readings and lectures by, a range of Israeli writers and filmmakers.

== Origin, education, and career ==
Born in Haifa, Israel, in 1948, to German-speaking parents, she earned a B.A. degree in Hebrew literature and Education from the Hebrew University of Jerusalem. She came to the United States in 1972 and earned M.A. and PhD degrees from the Jewish Theological Seminary of America (JTSA) in New York City. Under the supervision of Avraham Holtz, she wrote her doctoral thesis on the evolving artistic principles, or poetics, of the late works of Yehuda Amichai (1924–2000).

From 1979 to 1998, she taught at Columbia University, in the Middle Eastern and Asian Languages and Cultures department. During the 1998–99 academic year, she was Associate Professor and Chair of the Hebrew Language department at the Jewish Theological Seminary of America. She joined the faculty at the University of Pennsylvania in 2000.

== Scholarship and publications ==
Gold's first book appeared in Hebrew in 1994. Entitled, Lo Kabrosh (“Not Like a Cypress”), this book considers the transformations of images and structures in the late poetry of Yehuda Amichai. This book won the Award for the Best First Book in Hebrew Literature from the Ministry of Science and Culture of the State of Israel. Writing in the Lexikon heksherim lesifrut yisre’elit ("Lexicon of Hebrew Literature"), literary critic Maayan Harel wrote that this book "opened new directions in the study of Amichai."

Gold's second book, which appeared in English in 2008, is entitled, Yehuda Amichai: The Making of Israel’s National Poet, and traces the literary development of Amichai from the time of his childhood in Würzburg, Germany, following his family's emigration to mandatory Palestine in 1936, and later, after 1948, in Israel when he matured as a Hebrew poet. In the process she considers the vestigial influences of German on his Hebrew poetry. This book, which won the 2007 Lucius Littauer Foundation Publishing Award and the American-Israeli Cooperative Enterprise (AICE) publication grant for 2008, appeared in a revised edition in Hebrew in 2018. Writing in the Lexikon heksherim lesifrut yisre’elit ("Lexicon of Hebrew Literature"), literary critic Maayan Harel described Gold's book as a work of "poetic biography".

Gold's third book, Haifa: City of Steps, appeared in 2017, and won the 2016 Lucius Littauer Foundation Publishing Award and the 2017 Schusterman Center for Israel Studies Publication Grant. This book traces the history of Haifa and its people from end of Ottoman rule in the opening years of the twentieth century, through the British mandate period in Palestine, and following the establishment of Israel in 1948. Gold arranges her narrative around five architectural landmarks in the neighborhood of Hadar HaCarmel, where the city's diverse Jewish and Arab lived and mingled. Highly interdisciplinary, blending literary, architectural and political history, and including elements of memoir, Haifa: City of Steps uses the biography of this city to illuminate the collective cultural history of its residents across a century of change.

Gold has published articles in a wide range of journals, including Prooftexts, the Jewish Quarterly Review, Hebrew Studies, Middle Eastern Literatures, and more. Her publications reflect her work on the role of Mother Tongue in literature written in an acquired language, as illustrated in the poetry of Natan Zach; her analyses of the avant-garde Israeli author Yoel Hoffmann; and her attention to the works of Hebrew women writers, such as Lea Goldberg, Dahlia Ravikovitch, and Judith Katzir.

== Promotion of modern Hebrew culture in the US ==
Gold has taken an active role in promoting modern Hebrew works in English translation. At the University of Pennsylvania, she organized in 2004 an international conference featuring the work of Israeli novelist Amos Oz, who attended and spoke. She organized a similar international conference to celebrate the work of Aharon Appelfeld in 2011. In 2019, she hosted Israeli filmmaker Amos Gitai, who discussed his Hebrew film Tramway in Jerusalem.

Among the other writers and filmmakers she has hosted are Sami Michael, Amir Gutfreund, Meir Wiezeltier, Dahlia Ravikovitch, Yitzhak Gormezano Goren, and Judith Katzir. She has pursued this interest in promoting modern Hebrew culture through translation, and by engaging in comparative literary studies in classes the University of Pennsylvania, where she has taught Hebrew literature in English translation relative to its Arabic, Persian, and Turkish counterparts.

== Promotion of Middle Eastern film in the US ==
Beginning in 2010, Gold has promoted Middle Eastern cinema in Philadelphia by organizing an annual Middle East Film Festival with support from Penn's Middle East Center and other campus departments and programs. This festival has featured films from a range of Middle Eastern and North African countries, such as Iran, Algeria, Egypt, Palestine, Turkey, and Morocco. In conjunction with this series, Gold also invited several Israeli filmmakers, such as Avi Nesher and Amos Gitai, to speak on campus.
