= Meir Shalev =

Israeli writer (1948–2023)

- מאיר שלו
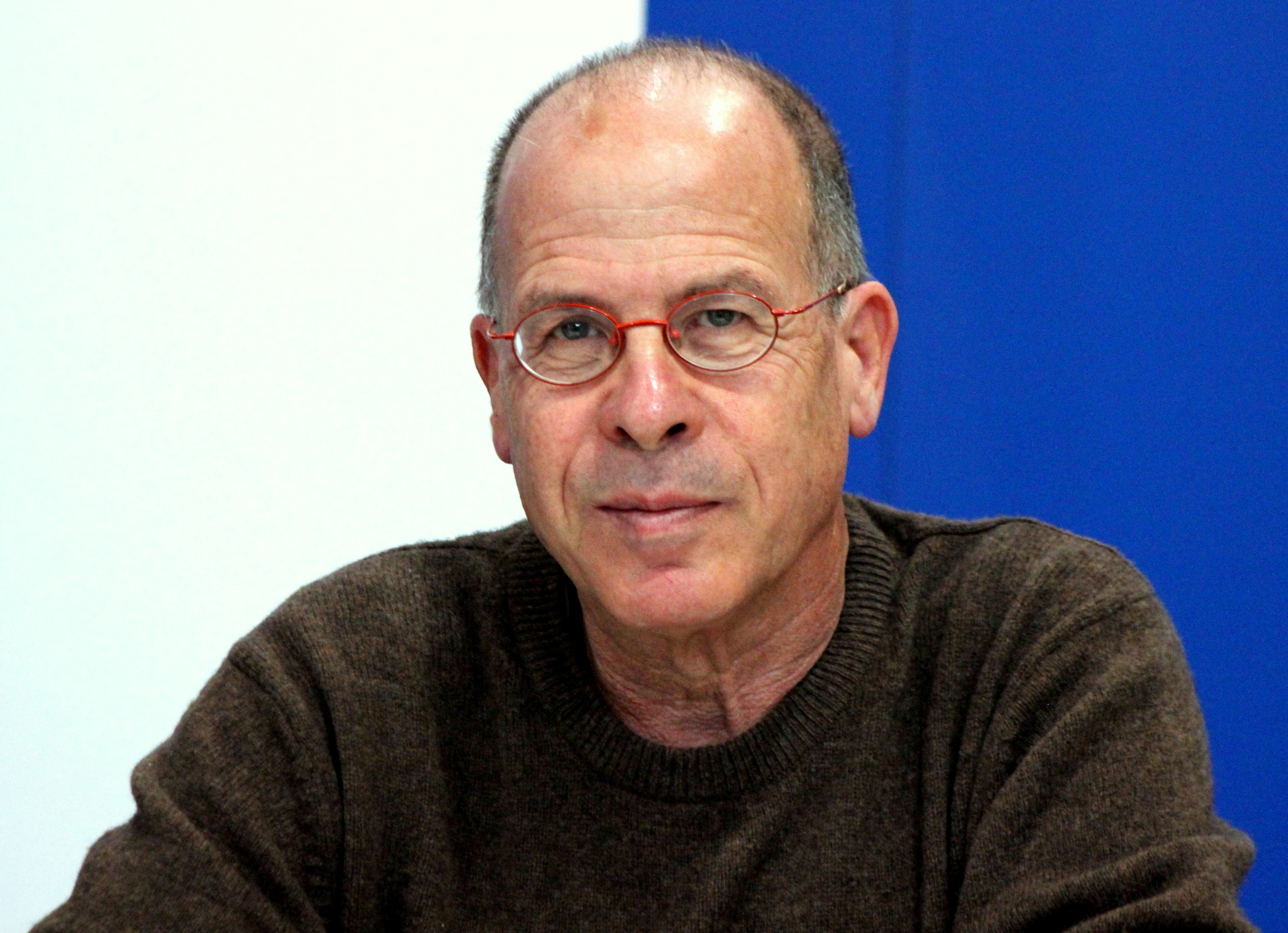
- Shalev in 2015
- Born: 29 July 1948; Nahalal, Israel
- Died: 11 April 2023 (aged 74); Alonei Abba, Israel
- Resting place: Nahalal Cemetery
- Writing career
- Language: Hebrew
- Notable awards: Bernstein Prize, Brenner Prize

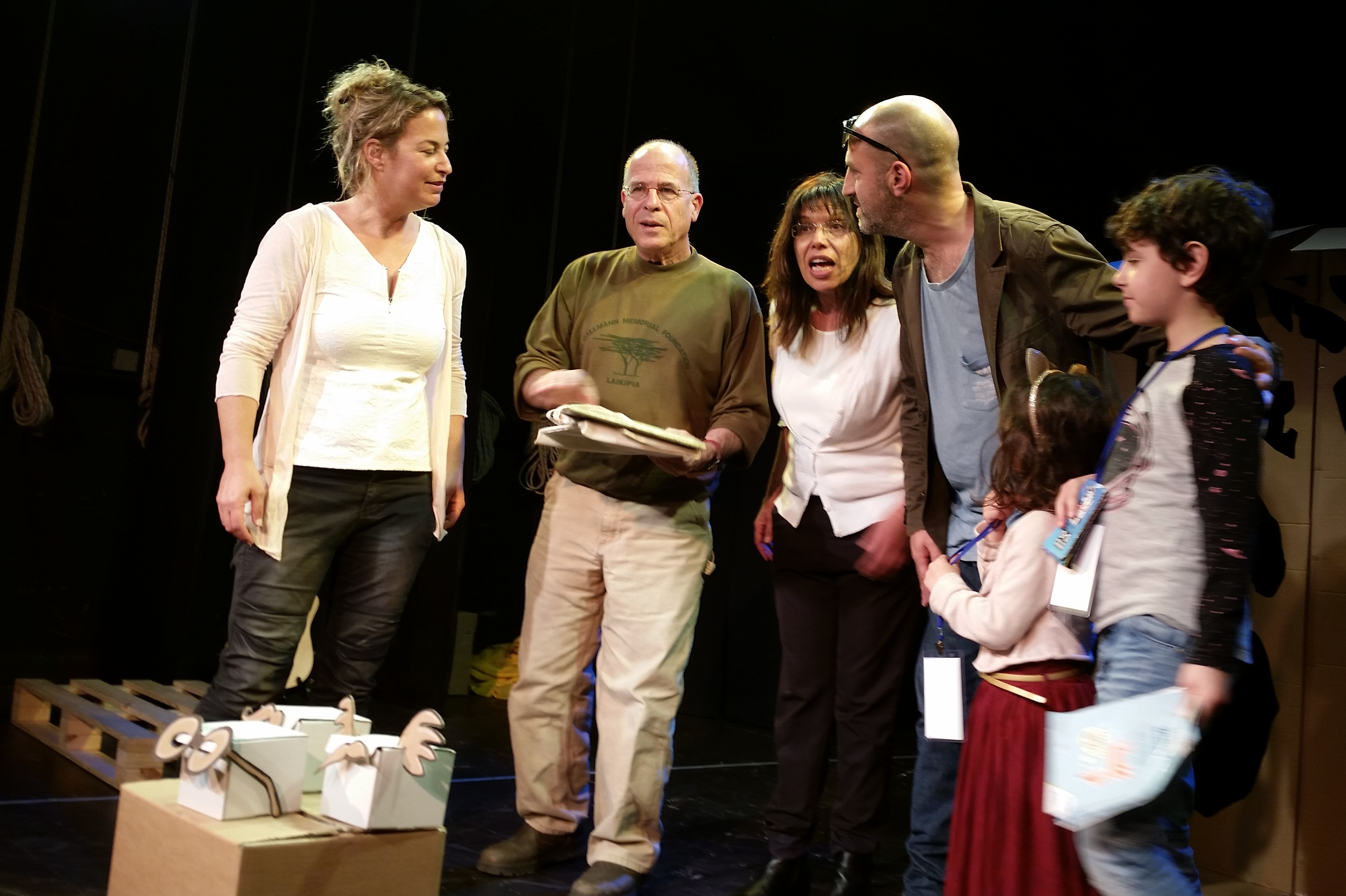
Meir Shalev and the theater performance team at the end of the play "Uncle Aaron and his Rain" which won the first prize at the Haifa International Children's Theater Festival in 2017

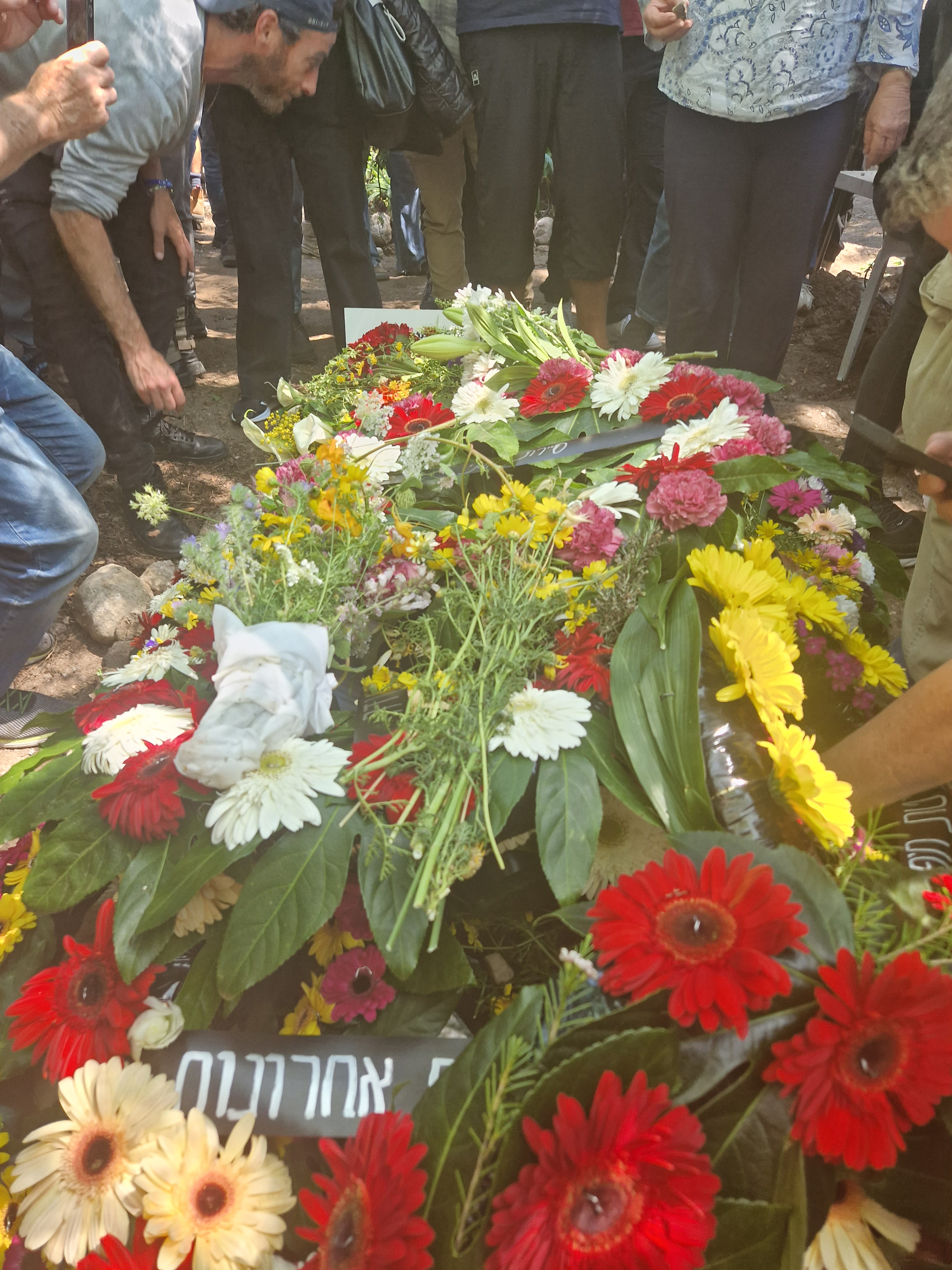
The grave of Meir Shalev is covered with flowers after the funeral, April 13, 2023

Meir Shalev (Hebrew: מאיר שלו; 29 July 1948 – 11 April 2023) was an Israeli writer and newspaper columnist for the daily Yedioth Ahronoth. Shalev's books have been translated into 26 languages.

== Biography ==
Shalev was born in Nahalal, Israel. Later he lived in Jerusalem and at Kibbutz Ginosar with his family. He is the son of the Jerusalem poet Yitzhak Shalev. His cousin Zeruya Shalev is also a writer.

He attended high school in the Hebrew University Secondary School. Shalev was drafted into the IDF in 1966, and did his military service in the Golani Brigade. He served as a soldier, a squad leader in the brigade's reconnaissance company. Shalev fought in the Six-Day War, and a few months after the war was injured in a friendly fire incident.

Shalev began his career by presenting ironic features on television and radio. He also moderated the program Erev Shabbat ("Friday night") on Israel channel one. His first novel, The Blue Mountain, was published in 1988.

Shalev also wrote non-fiction, children's books, and a weekly column in the weekend edition of Yediot Ahronot.

Shalev lived in the Jezreel Valley until his death on 11 April 2023, following a prolonged battle with cancer. He was 74. Upon news of Shalev's death, Israeli President Isaac Herzog expressed condolences: "Israel has lost one of its greatest storytellers, he made us love the Hebrew language, the Hebrew Bible, and ourselves, the Jewish People".

== Views and opinions ==
According to a January 2009 interview, Shalev identified with the Israeli left and believed that the conflict with the Palestinians could be resolved by establishing two states for two peoples. However, he expressed disappointment towards the extremism in the Palestinian camp, saying: "Radical Palestinians still say that the only solution would be for all Jews to pack their bags and return to where their grandparents came from. When there are no more Jews left in the Middle East, then the problem is solved, according to their logic. As long as they continue to think that way, there will be no peace. We are here and we are going to stay. Only after that fact is generally accepted can progress be made."

== Awards and recognition ==
- Bernstein Prize (original Hebrew novel category) (1989)
- Juliet Club Prize (1999)
- Chiavari Prize (1999)
- Brenner Prize (Israel) for A Pigeon and a Boy (2006)
- National Jewish Book Award for A Pigeon and a Boy (2007)
- Porta Siberia Prize (2009)
- Pratt Award for Environmental Journalism (2009)
- Neuman Prize (2011)
- Chevalier of the Ordre des Arts et des Lettres, along with Michal Govrin, in 2018

== Published works ==
=== Fiction ===
- 1988 The Blue Mountain ISBN 0-06-016691-6 (1988, originally published in Hebrew as Roman Rusi) English translation in 1991 by Hillel Halkin. Reprinted, 2010
- 1991 Esau ISBN 0-06-019040-X
- 1994 As a Few Days, also called The Four Meals or The Loves of Judith ISBN 1-84195-114-5
- 1998 His House in the Desert (or "Alone in the Desert")
- 2002 Fontanelle ISBN 3-257-23554-2
- 2006 A Pigeon and A Boy (originally published in Hebrew as Yona v'naar by Am Oved Publishers, Tel Aviv), translated by Evan Fallenberg, Random House, New York, ISBN 978-0-8052-4251-5
- 2013 Two She-Bears
- 2022 'Al Tesaper le-Akhicha (Hebrew: "Don't Tell Your Brother")

=== Non-fiction ===
- 1985 Bible Now, a book containing interpretations of Hebrew Bible stories from his personal point of view, which first appeared in the newspaper Haaretz.
- Elements of Conjuration
- 1995 Mainly About Love
- 1998 My Jerusalem
- 2008 In the Beginning: Firsts in the Bible
- 2011 Beginnings: Reflections on the Bible's Intriguing Firsts ISBN 0-307-71718-6 (Nonfiction)
- 2011 My Russian Grandmother and Her American Vacuum Cleaner ISBN 0-8052-4287-2
- 2017 My Wild Garden

=== Children's books ===
- 1982 Michael and the Monster of Jerusalem ISBN 965-382-001-X
- 1987 Zohar's Dimples
- 1988 My Father Always Embarrasses Me
- 1990 Nehama the Louse (also published as A Louse Named Thelma)
- 1993 How the Neanderthal Inadvertently Invented Kebab
- 1994 A flood, a snake and two arks
- 2021 “A Snake, a Flood, a Hidden Baby” (Eng, Kalaniot Books, USA)
- 1995 The Tractor in the Sandbox
- 2000 Aunt Michal
- 2004 A Lion at Night
- 2004 Roni and Nomi and the Bear Yaacov
- 2007 Uncle Aaron and his Rain
