= Galit Dahan Carlibach =

Israeli Author

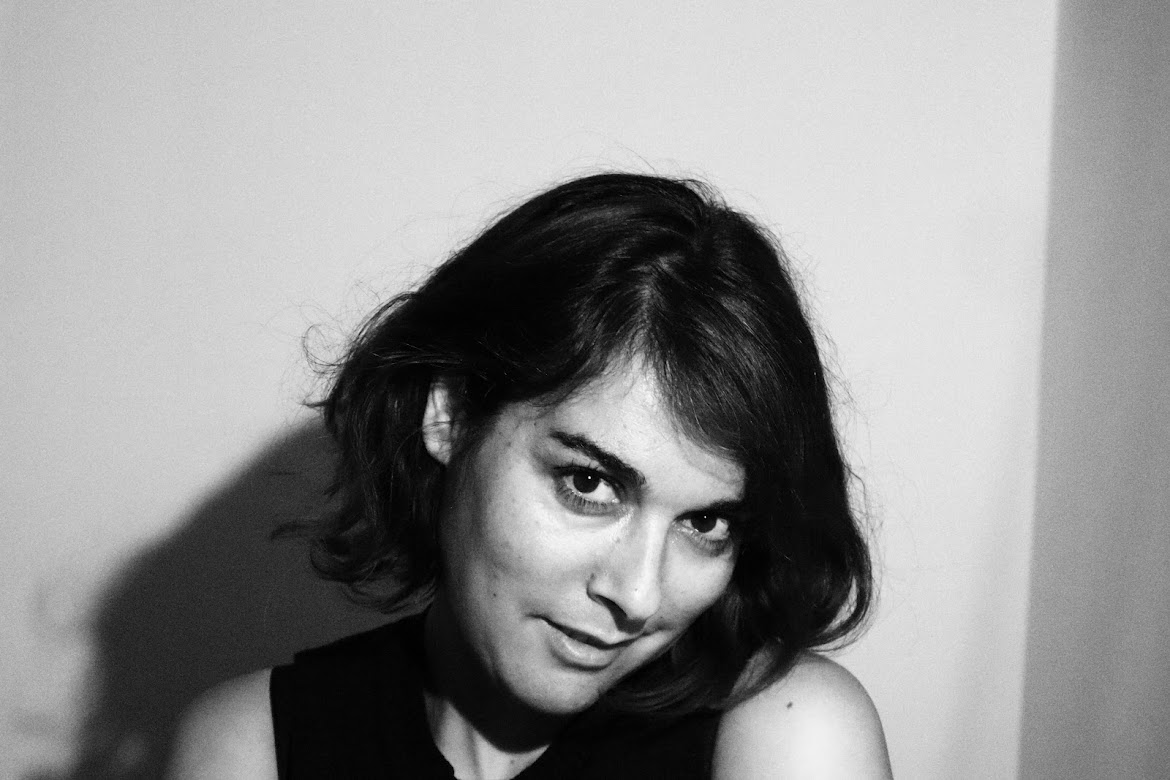
Galit Dahan-Carlibach in April 2023

Galit Dahan Carlibach (Hebrew: גלית דהן קרליבך; born 1981) is an Israeli author. She has published 7 books, short stories, essays and travel-literature

== Biography ==
Dahan Carlibach was born in 1981 in the development town of Sderot. She grew up there and in Ashdod and Jerusalem. She studied screenwriting in the Ma'aleh school in Jerusalem.

Some of her work has been translated to English, Spanish and German. Her short story Linber was included in the bilingual German-Hebrew collection We Don't Forget, We Go Dancing, and won first prize in the competition of the online magazine Berlin Today. Other short stories have appeared in English in Lilith (magazine) and Tablet magazine.

== Awards and Grants ==
- Prime Minister's Prize for Hebrew Literary Works (2014)
- ACUM Devora Omer Award (2014)
- National Library of Israel Pardes scholarship for young writers (2013-2014)
- Fulbright International writing program of Iowa University, where she wrote three short stories (2016)
- Shanghai writing program, 2017

== Works ==
=== Novels ===
- The Locked Garden, Kinneret-Zmora-Bitan, 2010
- Ghost Town, Booxilla (digital publisher), 2014
- The Hedge, Kinneret-Zmora-Bitan ,2014
- Alice's Storm, Kinneret-Zmora-Bitan, 2017
- It's me, Iowa, Graff, 2018
- Orphan's fortune, Ahuzat Bayit, 2023

=== Young adult titles ===
- Arpilea fantasy series
  - Book 1: Mystia, Kinneret-Zmora-Bitan, 2013
  - Book 2: The Return Of Ten Times, Kinneret-Zmora-Bitan, 2015
