= Nir Baram =

Israeli author

- ניר ברעם
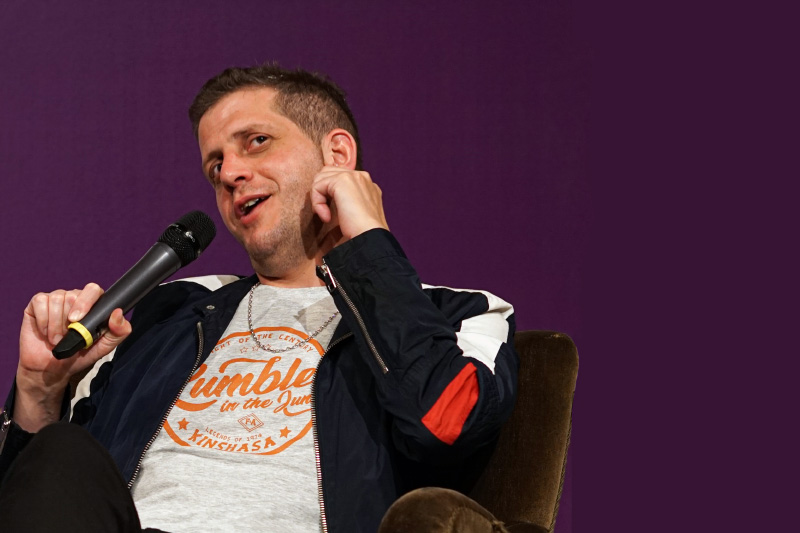
- Nir Baram at LiteratureXchange Festival in Aarhus (Denmark 2019)
- Born: June 2, 1976 (age 50); Jerusalem, Israel
- Education: Tel Aviv University (Literature)
- Occupation: Author
- Notable work: The Remaker of Dreams, Good People, World Shadow, At Night's End
- Relatives: Uzi Baram (father), Moshe Baram (grandfather)
- Awards: Prime Minister's Award for Hebrew literature (2010), Ophir Award for Best Documentary (2018)

Nir Baram (Hebrew: ניר ברעם; born June 2, 1976, in Jerusalem) is an Israeli author.

== Biography ==
Baram attended Hebrew University Secondary School. He later studied literature in Tel Aviv University and was an editor in Am Oved publishing house. His novels, The Remaker of Dreams (2006), Good People (2010) and At Night's End (2018), were shortlisted for Israel's Sapir Prize for Literature and were bestsellers in Israel. Good people was translated into 10 languages, and in 2010 Baram won the Prime Minister's Award for Hebrew literature and was shortlisted for the Rome Prize for literature (Premio Roma). His novel World Shadow, published in 2013, was a bestseller and attracted many responses inside the literary world and outside of it. Baram writes for Haaretz and other newspapers and is known for his political opinions. In the summer of 2006 he was one of the leaders of the young poets and authors who called for the ceasefire in the 2006 Lebanon War and in 2010 he gave a political and controversial speech in the opening of the 2nd International Writers Festival in Jerusalem.

In 2016 he published the non-fiction book A Land without Borders, based on his 2-year journey in the West Bank, which Baram later made into a documentary that won the Ophir Award (the Israeli Oscar) for best documentary in 2018. In 2018 Baram also published his novel At Night's End, based also on his childhood experiences in Jerusalem. The novel was a bestseller in Israel and was shortlisted for the Sapir Prize for Literature.

His father and grandfather are the Israeli politicians Uzi and Moshe Baram.

== Books ==
- The Remaker of Dreams, Keter, 2006 (German: Der Wiederträumer, Schöffling, 2009)
- Good people, Am Oved, 2010 (German- Carl Hanser Verlag; Spain- Alfaguara; Brasil- Editora Objetiva; France- Éditions Robert Laffont; Netherlands- De Bezige Bij; Italy- Ponte alle Grazie; Norway- Gyldendal; Finland- Otava; Denmark- Gyldendal; Catalan- Empuries Narrativa), (English- Text publishing
- World Shadow, Am Oved, 2013 Spain- Alfaguara, Netherlands- De Bezige Bij, Belgium- De Bezige Bij, Mexico- Alfaguara, Germany and Austria- Carl Hanser, Text publishing - world English rights
- A Land Without Borders, 2017, Text Publishing
- At Night's End, Am Oved, 2018, World rights were sold to Text publishing house
