= Sarah Blau =

Israeli author and playwright (born 1973)

- שהרה בלאו
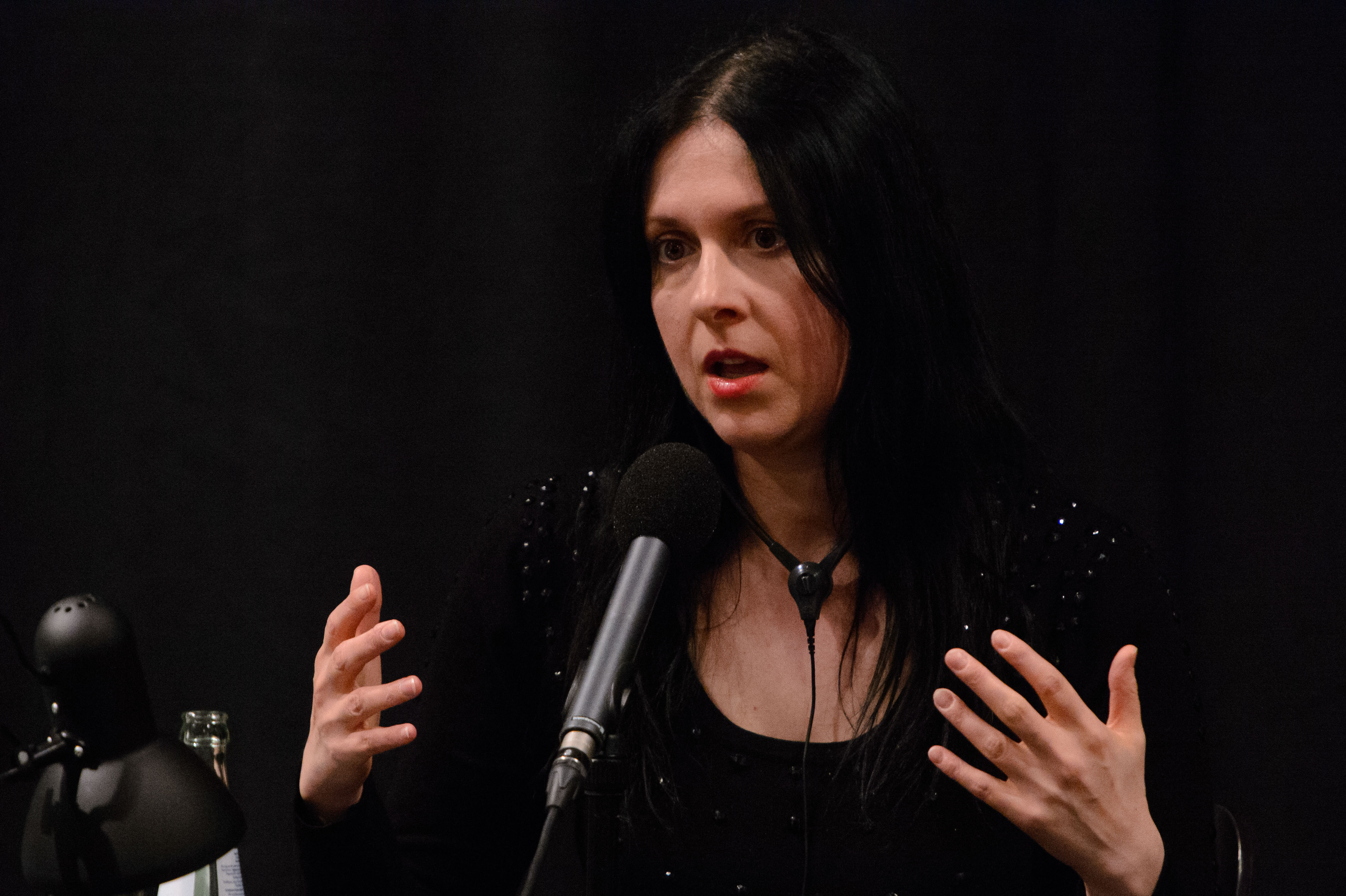
- Citizenship: Israel
- Occupations: Author, Columnist

Sarah Blau (Hebrew: שהרה בלאו; born May 17, 1973) is an Israeli author and playwright. She won the Levi Eshkol's Prize for Hebrew Literature in 2015 and the 2017 Bar-Ilan University Alumni Achievement Award.

== Early life education ==
Blau was born in Bnei Brak (a religious city which appears frequently in her work), the oldest daughter of modern orthodox religious family. She is considered a prominent voice in religious Israeli literature, and identifies herself as ‘religious-lite.’ She served as editor and presenter on various television and radio shows that focus on Jewish topics from an original, feminist perspective and also hosted a weekly TV show in which she discussed biblical figures with children. Single and childfree, she was quoted as saying, "I wrote an entire thriller to understand why it works for me." As part of her Sherut Leumi (National service) she volunteered in The Hedva Ibshitz Centre for the Study of the Holocaust, where she worked as a guide and documented Holocaust survivors.

In 1999 she initiated the alternative Yom HaShoa (Holocaust remembrance day) ceremonies. In the first years the alternative ceremonies took place in Tel Aviv and raised controversy, but later became widespread throughout Israel. The ceremonies focused on remembrance from a personal and social perspective of the participants.

== Literary work ==
In Blau's fiction, ancient Jewish myths serve as springboards for ironic reexamination and reinvention. She is the author of four novels, several plays and short stories published in various anthologies in Israel and abroad.

Blau's debut novel, "The Book of Creation" (Hebrew: "Yetzer Lev Ha-Adama", 2007), concerns a lonely woman who can't find a spouse so she creates a man shaped Golem.

Her second book, "Those Well-Raised Girls", (Hebrew: Ne'arot Le-Mofet, 2012) combines dark suspense with a tale of sexual awakening. At a religious high school for girls, a 17-year-old student is preparing a play based on the story of The 93 Girls, Jewish girls from Kraków who committed suicide to avoid rape (a story once believed to true, but now is considered a myth).

Her third book, "Stake", (Hebrew: "Yated", 2014), was written while Blau was performing her one-woman show, "Thy Shall Write". In the show, a heart broken novelist is working on a modern version of the story of Jael, the biblical heroine who killed Sisera to deliver the Israelites.

Her fourth book,"The Others", (Hebrew: "Ha'acherot", 2018), has been sold in eight languages.

In 2015 Blau was one of the winners of Levi Eshkol's Prize for Hebrew literature. The judges praised Blau for a daring, nonconformist style, that is at the same time connected to tradition and religious life.
