= Yishai Sarid =

Israeli author, novelist and lawyer (born 1965)

Yishai Sarid ישי שריד
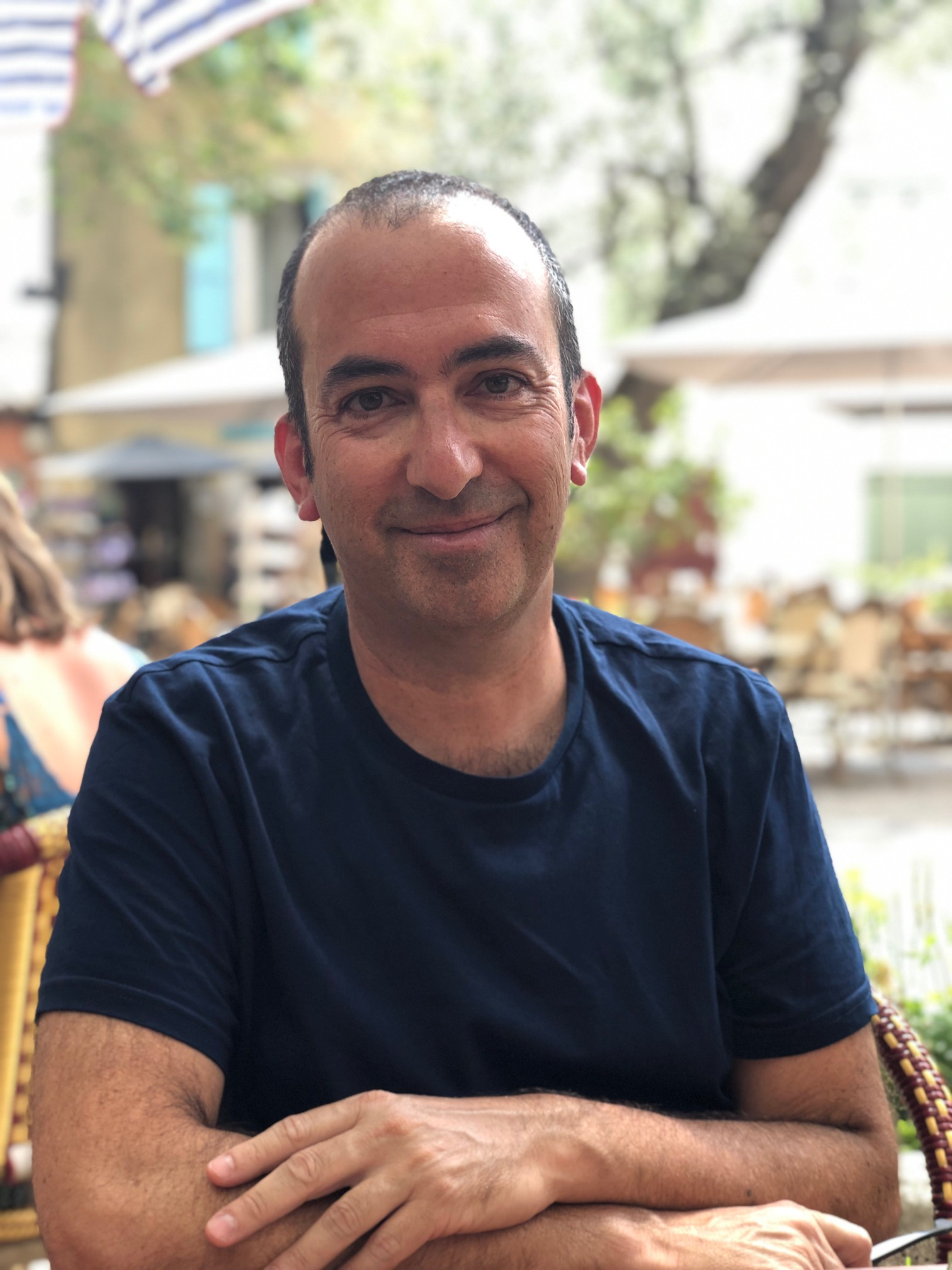
- Born: 1965 (age 60–61); Tel Aviv, Israel
- Occupations: Lawyer, writer, novelist, and journalist
- Writing career
- Notable works: Limassol, The Third, The Memory Monster
- Notable awards: Best international crime novel 2011 at the Grand Prix de Littérature Policière for Limassol. nominated for 2012 International Dublin Literary Award, SNCF Literary Award 2011, all for Limassol. 2016 Bernstein literary prize for The Third. 2023 Brenner prize for literature for "vulnerabilities". 2025 Agnon prize.

Yishai Sarid (Hebrew: ישי שריד; born 1965) is an Israeli author, novelist and lawyer.

== Biography ==
Yishai Sarid was born and raised in Tel Aviv, Israel. He is the son of senior politician and journalist Yossi Sarid. Between 1974-1977 he lived with his family in the northern town of Kiryat Shmona, near the Lebanon border. Sarid was recruited to the Israeli Army in 1983 and served for 5 years. During his service, he finished the IDF's officers school and served as an intelligence officer. He studied law at the Hebrew University of Jerusalem. Sarid has a Public Administration master's degree (MPA) from the Kennedy School of Government at Harvard University (1999).

Sarid is married to Dr. Racheli Sion-Sarid, a critical care paediatrician, and they have 3 children.

== Legal career ==
In 1994-1997 he worked for the Government as an Assistant District Attorney in Tel-Aviv, prosecuting criminal cases. Today he is a lawyer and arbitrator, practicing mainly civil and administrative law. His law office is located in Tel Aviv.

== Literary career ==
Sarid published so far 9 novels. His books won prestigious literary awards in Israel and were translated to different languages. His second book, Limassol, became an international best-seller. His fourth book, The Third, won the Bernstein literary award. His fifth book, The memory monster, was included on the New York Times list of 100 notable books of 2020.

== Published works ==
- The Investigation of Captain Erez, Yedioth Ahronoth, 2000. A female soldier accuses an officer of raping her, and a young lawyer is called to investigate the case. The book was published also in France.
- Limassol, Am Oved, 2009. It was translated to 8 languages, won the Grand Prix de litterature policiere in France (2011) and was shortlisted to the Irish IMPAC prize. It tells the story of a secret service agent getting involved in a plot with an ailing Palestinian poet from Gaza, his exiled terrorist son, and an Israeli female peace activist.
- Naomi's Kindergarten, Am Oved, 2013. A story of one crucial year in the life of a Tel Aviv preschool assistant. It was shortlisted for the Sapir Literary Prize in Israel, and published also in German.
- The Third, Am Oved, 2015. The story takes place in the Third Temple built in Jerusalem, after the state of Israel is replaced by the religious kingdom of Judea. It became a best seller in Israel and has been a subject of significant public discussion there, due to its relevance to cultural, political and religious issues that dominate Israeli society. It won the Bernstein literary award. It has been published in translation in French and Italian, and in 2024 into English under the title The Third Temple.
- The Memory Monster, Am Oved, 2017. A report written by a young historian to the chairman of the Yad Vashem (Israel's national Holocaust memorial authority), about the way his life has become trapped in the memory of the Holocaust due to his work as a guide to the sites of Nazi German extermination camps in Poland. It was included on the New York Times list of 100 notable books of 2020 and translated to 8 languages. The novel was adapted into a monodrama by the actor Ben Yosepovitch and presented by Israel's national theatre "Habima".
- Victorious, Am Oved, 2020. A veteran military psychologist, specializing in the mental training of combat soldiers, is consulting the chief of staff of the Israeli Army on how to win the next war. When her son is recruited to combat duty, a conflict of duties emerges. It was translated to English, German, Spanish and Catalan.
- Vulnerabilities, Am Oved, 2023. A coming of age story of a young specialist hacker of smartphones, working for an Israeli cyber company. The book won the Brenner Prize. It was translated to German and French.
- The Panelist, Am Oved, 2024. A veteran journalist, long forgotten, gets a chance to return to the spotlight in the patriotic TV channel. He catches this opportunity as a lifeline and is ready to sell his soul for it. It was translated to German.
- Hanoch the physician from Korazim, Am Oved, 2026. Hanoch, a physician from the village of Korazim, goes out day and night to treat the residents of the villages near the Sea of Galilee, trying to save them from disease, suffering and death. He must struggle not only against the decrees of nature, but also against the malicious persecutions of Rabbi Meir, the fanatical head of the village religious court. One day, a miracle worker named Jesus of Nazareth appears in the village. A relationship of closeness develops between him and Hanoch, alongside suspicion and competition. One is a very human hero, well aware of his limitations, while the other claims to be an all-powerful saviour.

== Awards and recognition ==
In 2011 Sarid won the Grand Prix de litterature policiere in France for "Limassol". In 2016 he won the Bernstein literary award for "The Third". In 2023 Sarid won the Levi Eshkol Prize for Hebrew writers, and announced he would donate it to The Israeli-Palestinian Parents Circle-Families Forum. Also in 2023 his book Vulnerabilities won the Brenner Prize for Hebrew literature.The prize committee explained its choice of the book by saying that it "confronts the reader with a universal theme whose manifestations are revealed in the human condition each time in a different way... Yishai Sarid built a complex character and presents her without any pretense or vanity, without self-righteousness or blame-shifting." In 2025 Sarid won the Agnon literary prize. The prize committee explained its choice by saying: "Yishay Sarid is one of the most prominent and penetrating voices in contemporary Israeli literature. Over the years, Sarid has published eight books through which he examines Israeli reality and reveals its complexity - its strengths alongside the horror and doubts that lurk within it. Sarid leads the reader on an investigative journey beyond the contemporary present, and poses pointed questions regarding the state of Israeli society and its future. His writing presents a reality in which the boundaries of imagination and Israeli existence merge with each other."

== Public activity ==
In August 2025 Sarid signed an Israeli Artists' petition to stop the atrocities against civilian population in Gaza, to stop the war there and to release the Israeli hostages through a diplomatic agreement.

Sarid spoke at demonstrations held in Israel against the right-wing government and its policies.
