= Eshkol Nevo =

Israeli writer (born 1971)

- אשכול נבו
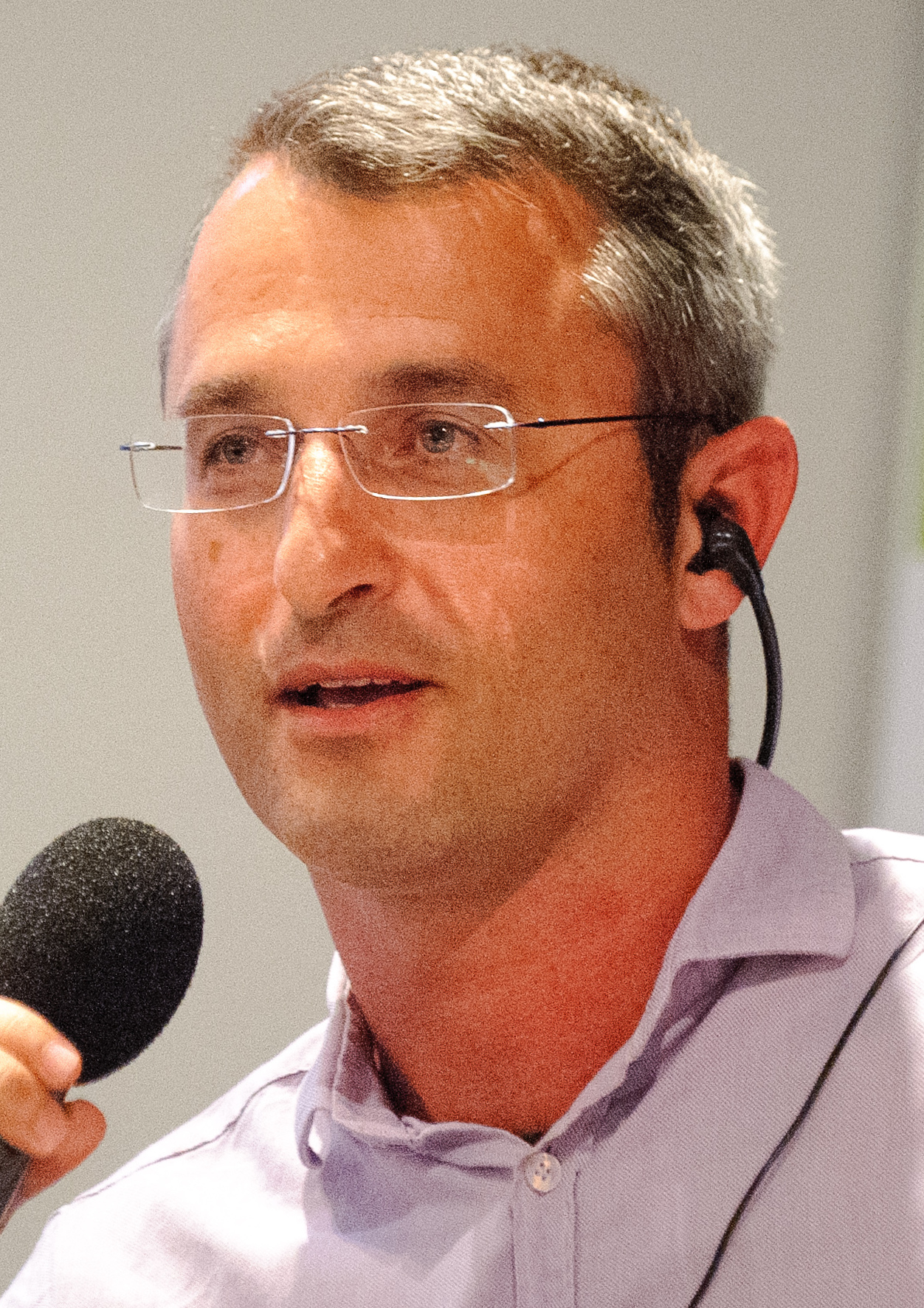
- German-Israeli Literature Days 2012
- Born: February 28, 1971 (age 55); Jerusalem, Israel
- Education: Tel Aviv University
- Occupation: novelist
- Writing career
- Period: 2001-Today
- Notable works: Homesick; World Cup Wishes; Neuland; Three Floors Up
- Website: www.eshkol-nevo.com

Eshkol Nevo (Hebrew: אשכול נבו; born 28 February 1971) is an Israeli writer who has published a collection of short stories, five novels and a work of non-fiction. One of his novels, Homesick, was awarded the Book Publishers Association Gold Prize (2005) and the FFI-Raymond Wallier Prize at the Salon du Livre (Paris, 2008). In 2008, Eshkol was awarded membership in the Israel Cultural Excellence Foundation (IcExcellence), one of the country's highest recognitions for excellence in the arts.

== Life and career ==
Eshkol Nevo grew up in Jerusalem, Haifa, and Detroit. He is the grandson of Israeli Prime Minister Levi Eshkol, for whom he was named.

He studied copywriting at the Tirza Granot School and psychology at Tel Aviv University.

He teaches creative writing and thinking at the Bezalel Academy of Art and Design, Tel Aviv University, Sapir College and the Open University of Israel. Nevo, together with Orit Gidali who is an author and poet, established Sadnaot Habait, which is a school for writers.

== Works in Hebrew ==
=== Stories ===
- Zimmer Be-Givatayyim (Bed & Breakfast), Zmora Bitan, 2001

=== Novels ===
- Arbaa Batim ve-Gaagua (Homesick), Zmora Bitan, 2004
- Mishala Achat Yamina (World Cup Wishes), Kinneret Zmora-Bitan Dvir, ISBN 965-517-274-0 (965-517-274-0), 2007
- Neuland, Zmora Bitan Publishing, 2011
- Ha-Miqveh ha-Aharon be-Sibir (The Last Ritual Bathhouse in Siberia), Kinneret, Zmora-Bitan, Dvir, 2013
- Shalosh Qomot (Three Floors), Zmora Bitan, 2015
- Ha-reayon ha-Acharon (The last interview), Zmora Bitan, 2018
- Gever Nichnas Bapardes (Man enters the orchard), Zmora Bitan, 2021
- Lev Raev (Hungry Heart), Zmora Bitan, 2023

=== For children ===
- Aba shel Amaliya Nosea le-Australiya (Amalia's father travels to Australia), 2010
- Machshava mamtina (Thought on hold), 2022

=== Nonfiction ===
- Nifradnu Trach (The Breaking-Up Manual), Zmora Bitan, 2002

== Works translated to English ==
- Homesick, Chatto and Windus, trade paperback, ISBN 978-0-7011-8128-4, paperback, ISBN 978-0-09-950767-3, 20 May 2008, translated by Sondra Silverston
- World Cup Wishes, Chatto and Windus, trade paperback, ISBN 978-0-7011-8442-1, 6 May 2010, translated by Sondra Silverston
- Neuland, Chatto and Windus, trade paperback, ISBN 978-0-7011-8778-1, paperback, ISBN 978-0-09-957855-0, 15 February 2014, translated by Sondra Silverston
- Three Floors Up, Other Press LLC, 2017, translated by Sondra Silverston. ISBN 1590518780, ISBN 9781590518786

== Works translated to German ==
- Vier Häuser und eine Sehnsucht ("Homesick"), premium: Band 24564, paperback, ISBN 3-423-24564-6, translated by Anne Birkenhauer
- Wir haben noch das ganze Leben ("World Cup Wishes"), paperback, ISBN 978-3-423-14067-6, translated by Markus Lemke
- Die einsamen Liebenden ("The Last Ritual Bathhouse in Siberia"), ISBN 978-3-423-26088-6, translated by Anne Birkenhauer
- Neuland, ISBN 978-3-423-14510-7, paperback, ISBN 978-3-423-28022-8, translated by Anne Birkenhauer
- Über uns ("Three Floors Up"), ISBN 978-3-423-28131-7, translated by Markus Lemke

== Works translated to French ==
- Quatre maisons et un exil, Gallimard, ISBN 978-2-07-077710-5, January 2008, translated by Raïa Del Vecchio
- Le cours du jeu est bouleversé, Gallimard, ISBN 978-2-07-012367-4, June 2010, translated by Jean-Luc Allouche
- Neuland, Gallimard, ISBN 978-2-07-013845-6, May 2014, translated by Jean-Luc Allouche
- Trois étages, Gallimard, ISBN 978-2-07-017820-9, 2018, 321 p., translated by Jean-Luc Allouche
- Jours de Miel , Gallimard, ISBN 9782070148943, 2016, 320 p., translated by Jean-Luc Allouche
- La dernière interview, Gallimard, ISBN 978-2-07-285520-7, 2020, 1. ed. 2018, 468 p. , translated by Jean-Luc Allouche
- Turbulences, Gallimard, ISBN 978-2072970337, 2024, 336 p., translated by Jean-Luc Allouche
