= Yael Neeman =

Israeli writer

- יעל נאמן
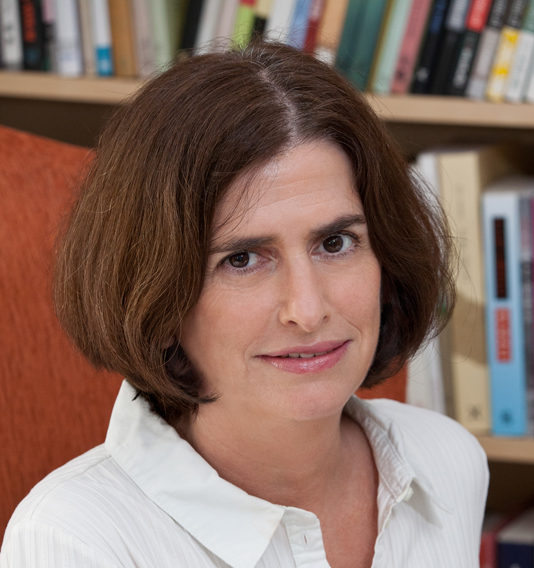
- Yael Neeman
- Born: 1960 (age 65–66); Kibbutz, Yehiam
- Occupation: Israeli writer

Yael Neeman (Hebrew: יעל נאמן; born 1960), is an Israeli author.

== Biography ==
Yael Neeman was born in Kibbutz Yehiam. In the early eighties she moved to Tel Aviv. She studied for her master's degree in Hebrew Literature and Philosophy at Tel Aviv University.

She worked as a literary editor in Israeli publishing houses and in the late 1990s started to write her own works.

In addition to her 5 novels, she has been published in newspapers and literary journals in Israel and abroad. Her play (written with Amir Rotem) was performed in Beit Lessin Theatre in 2006.

In 2011 she published her third book "We Were The Future" (Hayinu He’atid) with Ahuzat Bait Publishing House, which describes her childhood and adolescence in Kibbutz, Yehiam. The book was on the bestseller lists for many months, including no. 1 for several weeks. That same year, Neeman won The Book Publishers Association of Israel's Golden Book Award for having sold more than 20,000 copies, and was nominated for the prestigious Sapir Prize for Literature. The Polish version has been published under the name Byliśmy przyszłością (in September 2012) by the publisher Wydawnictwo Czarne. The book also won a special grant from The Rabinovich Foundation to be translated into English by Sondra Silverston. The book was published in English in the United States in September, 2016 by Overlook Abrams. The French version is being published by Actes Sud in April 2015 under the name "Nous étions l’avenir".

In August 2013 Neeman's fourth book, a selection of short stories entitled "The Option" (Ktovet Aish), was published by Keter Publishing House. The book readers and remained on the bestseller list for several weeks.

"The Option" was nominated for the Sapir Prize for Literature for 2014.

Neeman was awarded the Prime Minister's Prize for Hebrew Literary Works for 2015.

In 2015, she participated in the International Writing Program's Fall Residency at the University of Iowa in Iowa City, IA.

In May 2018 her book "There Was a Woman" was published by Ahuzat Bait Publishing House, and was shortlisted for the Sapir Prize for Literature, 2019, and it was on the bestseller lists for several months. The book won The Book Publishers Association of Israel's Golden Book Award for having sold more than 20,000 copies.

In 2024, she published "Were You Good or Were You Bad?", which explores the origins and lasting impact of Kibbutz communal child rearing and collective education.

== Works in Hebrew ==
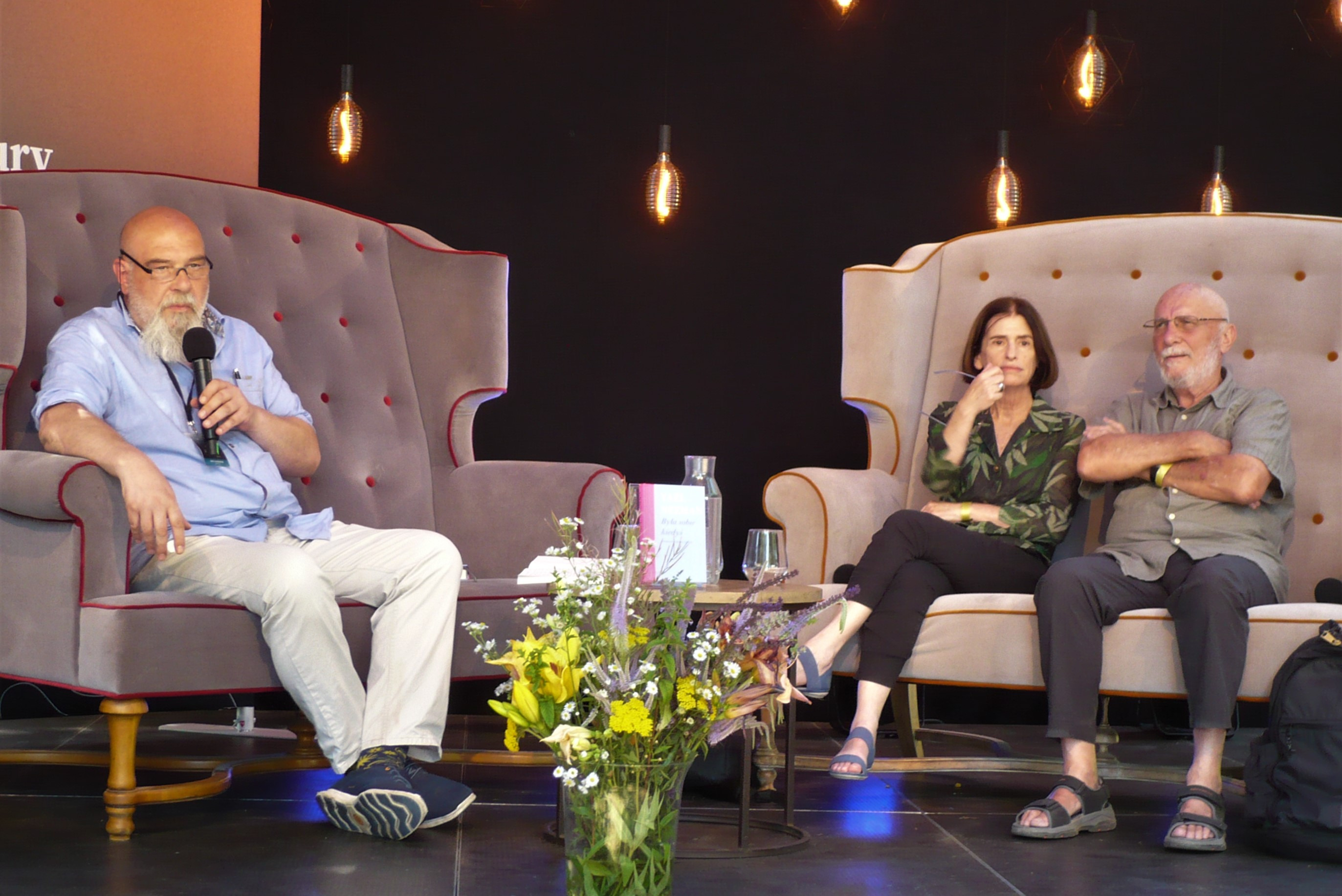
Yael Neeman, IX Literary Heights Festival, 2023

- "Orange Tuesday" Am Oved Publishing House, Tel Aviv 1998
- "Rumors About Love" Katom Publishing House, Tel Aviv 2004
- "We Were The Future" Ahuzat Bait Publishing House, 2011
- "The Option", Keter Publishing House, 2013
- "There Was a Woman" Ahuzat Bait Publishing House, 2018
- "Were You Good or Were You Bad?", Ahuzat Bayit Publishing House, 2024

== Translations ==
- Byliśmy przyszłością Wydawnictwo Czarne, Wolowiec 2012
- Nous étions l’avenir Actes Sud, 2015
- We Were The Future - A Memoir of the Kibbutz, New York - London, 2016
