= Shimon Adaf =

Israeli poet and author born in Sderot

- שמעון אדף
- Citizenship: Israel
- Occupations: Poetic and Author

Shimon Adaf (Hebrew: שמעון אדף; born 1972) is an Israeli poet and author born in Sderot. Shimon, born to parents of Moroccan origin, now lives in Jaffa.

== Education and career ==
Shimon Adaf's first book of poetry, Icarus' Monologue, won a prize from the Israeli Ministry of Education. In 1996–2000, Adaf studied at Tel Aviv University, simultaneously writing articles on literature, film and rock music for Israeli newspapers. In 2000–2005, he worked as a prose editor for Keter Publishing House. He is currently the chair person of the creative writing program at Ben Gurion University in Israel.

In 2013, he won Israel's prestigious Sapir Prize for his novel Mox Nox.

He was interviewed on the Shaping Business Minds Through Art podcast in 2020.

== Awards ==
- 2007 - Prime Minister's Prize for Hebrew Literary Works
- 2010 - Yehuda Amichai Award
- 2012 - Sapir Prize
- 2017 - Newman Prize
- 2024 - Landau Prize for Poetry

== Books ==
=== Poetry ===
- Icarus' Monologue, 1997
- That Which I Thought Shadow Is the Real Body, 2002
- Aviva-No, 2009

=== Prose ===
(All titles given in approximate English translation)

- One Mile and Two Days Before Sunset, 2004
- The Buried Heart, 2007
- Sunburnt Faces, 2008
- Frost, 2010
- Mox Nox, 2011
- Undercities, 2012
- The Wedding Gifts, 2014
- Detective's Complaint, 2015
- Shadrach, 2017
- Rise and Call, 2017
- I Loved Loving, 2019

=== Non-fiction ===
- Art and War, 2016 (with Lavie Tidhar)
- I am others, 2018
