= Ronny Someck =

Israeli poet and author (born 1951)

- רוני סומק
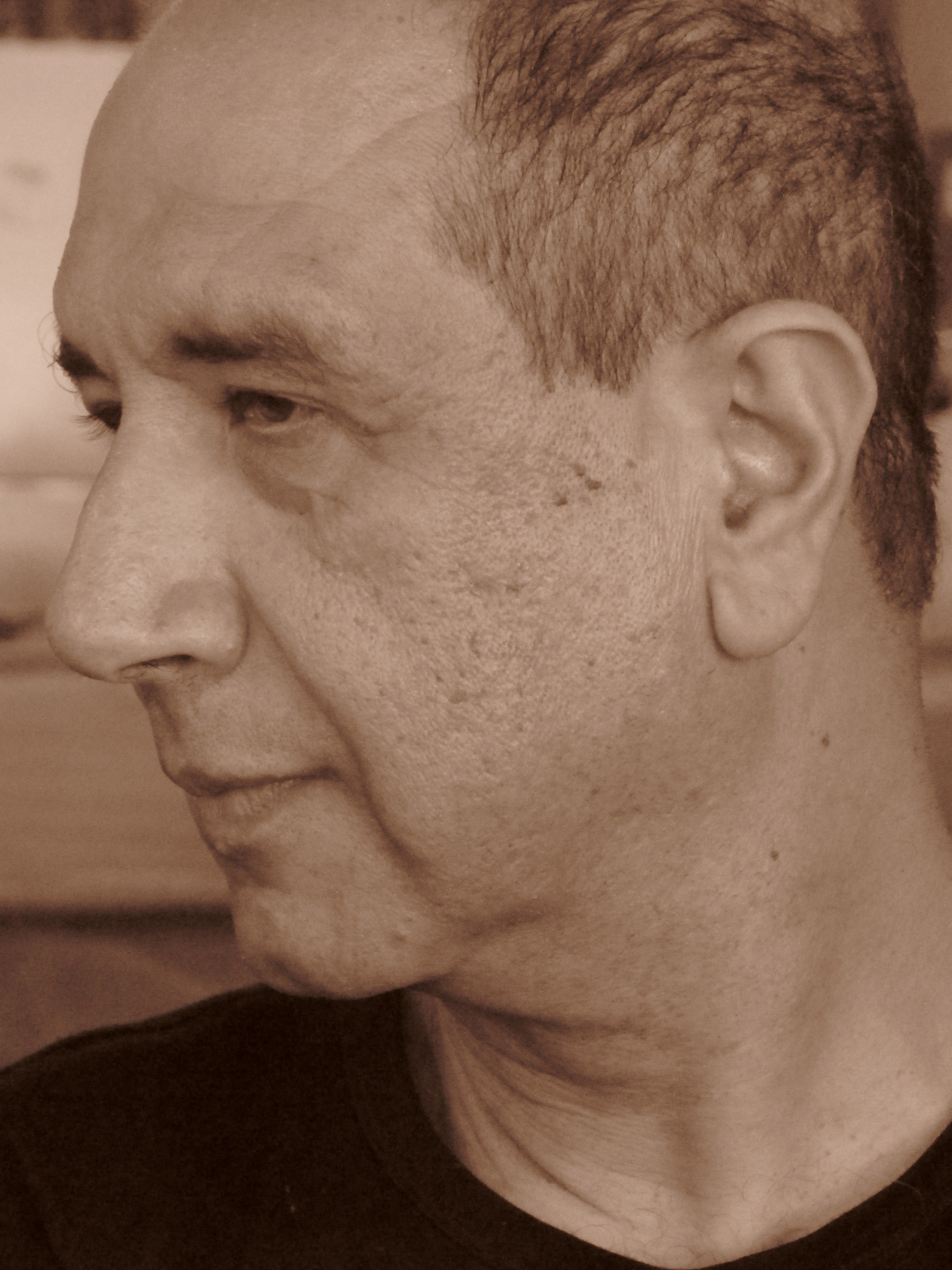
- Born: 1951 (age 74–75); Baghdad, Iraq
- Occupations: Poet, painter, author
- Writing career
- Language: Hebrew
- Notable works: The Milk Underground, Exile, Horsepower
- Notable awards: Prime Minister's Award for Hebrew Literature, Hans Berghhuis Prize (Netherlands), Ramat Gan Prize for Literature

Ronny Someck (Hebrew: רוני סומק; born 1951) is an Israeli poet, painter and author.

== Biography ==
Ronny Someck was born in Baghdad. His family immigrated to Israel when he was a young. He studied Hebrew literature and philosophy at Tel Aviv University and drawing at the Avni Academy of Art.

== Academic and literary career ==
Someck teaches literature and leads creative writing workshops.

Someck has published 16 volumes of poetry and authored 2 children's book together with his daughter Shirly (The Laughter Button and Monkey Tough, Monkey Bluff), that have been translated into 45 languages. Selections of his poems have appeared in Arabic translation, French, Catalan, Albanian, Italian, Macedonian, Croatian, Yiddish, Nepali, Dutch, Danish, Spanish, Portuguese, Romanian and English.

== Music and art career ==
He has recorded three discs with the musician Elliott Sharp: Revenge of the Stuttering Child, Poverty Line, and A Short History of Vodka.

As a visual artist, he has presented several notable exhibitions, including Nature’s Factory, Winter 2046, a collaborative exhibition with Benni Efrat at the Israel Museum in 1998, Two Times Chai at the Beit Avi Chai Gallery in Jerusalem, curated by Amichai Chasson, and Friends in Ink at the University of Haifa Gallery, curated by Philip Rantzer.

He is a member of the Public Council of the Batsheva Dance Company and the Hebrew-Arabic Theatre.

== Published works ==
- Stamp in the Body's Passport (2026)
- fire (2024)
- The Offside of love (2023)
- Hermes (2022)
- So much god (2020)
- Revenge of the Stuttering Child (2017)
- Horse power (2013)
- Algeria (2009)
- The Milk Underground (2005)
- The Revolution Drummer (2001)
- Rice Paradise (1996)
- Bloody Mary (1994)
- Panther (1989)
- Seven Lines on the Wonder of the Yarkon (1987)
- Asphalt (1984)
- Solo (1980)
- Exile (1976)

For children:

- The Laughter Button with Shirly Someck (1998)
- Monkey Tough, Monkey Bluff with Shirly Someck (2012)

In Albanian

- The Sign of the Bite (2001, Tirane)
- Prekla e te Qeshurit (2006, Tirane)

In Arabic:

- Jasmine (1994, Israel)
- And the poem is a gangster's girl (1996, Paris)
- Lion's Milk (2010 Cairo)
- I love her and let the world burn (2022, Israel)

In Catalan:

- En paper de vidre (2000, Barcelona)
- Amor Pirata (2006, Barcelona)

In Croatian

- Poems (Special edition on the occasion of Literature Live Festival. 2008, Zagreb)

In English:

- The Fire Stays in Red (2002, USA)
- The milk underground (White Pine Press - Cliff Becker Book Prize in Translation 2015 USA)

In French:

- Nes a Bagdad with A.K. El Janabi (1998, Paris)
- Constat de Beaute (Edition PHI, 2008, Luxembourg)
- Bagdad Jerusalem with Salach Al Hamdani(Edition s Bruno Doucey, Paris 2012)
- Le Baiser de la Poesie, 24 Poemes d'amour de Yehuda Amichai et Ronny Someck (edition Levant, Paris 2016)
- Le piano ardent (Editions Bruno Doucey, Paris 2017)
- Lettre imaginaires (Edition Segust, 2021)
- cristal blues (Edition Segust, 2022)
- La poesie n'est pas une metaphore (Edition Levant 2023)
- Contre chante & poèmes complices with Michel Eckhard Elial (Edition Levant 2025)

In Italian

- Il Rosso Catalogo della Parola Tramonto with Fausta Squatriti (NOLA)
- Il Bambino Balbuziente (Mesogea, Sicily 2008), transl. by Maria Teresa Milano

In Macedonian

- weat (2005, Skopje)
- Asphalt Dragons (2011, Skopje)

In Nepali

- Baghdad, February 1991 Translated into Nepali by Yuyutsu RD Sharma, (Nirala Publications, 2010, New Delhi in collaboration with White Lotus Book Shop, Kathmandu)

In Yiddish

- I am a pajama Iraqi (H.Levick Publishing House, Tel Aviv)

In Dutch

- Blues van de derde zoen (Azul Press.Maasticht 2010)
- Mug Shot (with Hans van de Waarsenburg) Azul Press.Maasticht 2012)

in Danish

- Solens fine pensel (Forlagrt Goldberg & Mor. Copenhagen 2010)

In Portuguese

- Left foot goal (annablume.brazil 2012)

In German

- Nagel (Azul Press 2012)

In Spanish

- El Paraiso del Arroz (Leviatan 2013)

In Russian

- The Leopard and the Glass Slipper. Tr:Lena (Elena) Baibikov. Knizhnoe obozrenie (ARGO-RISK): Moscow, 2014

In Turkish

- The Ballad of Alcohol valley. Tr: Muesse Yeniay. (Siiri). Turkey 2014

In Romanian

- "Bagdad-Ierusalim". Tr: Simona Modreanu. (JUMIMEA) Romania 2026

Translations of his poems have appeared in anthologies and poetry journals in 41 languages.

== Awards and recognition ==
He is the recipient of the Prime Minister's Award, Yehuda Amichai Award for Hebrew poetry, The "Wine poem award" in Struga Poetry Evenings, Macedonia, 2005 and Hans Berghhuis prize for poetry 2006 at the Maastricht International Poetry Nights, the Netherlands.

In 2012 he was awarded the Cross of The Order of The Knights for a Distinguished Service of Poland.

In 2013 he was awarded the knight of the Order of Arts and Letters of France.

In 2016 he was awarded the exemplary man of the "Lions International".

In 2017 he received a college prestige of the Arab Academic College for Education in Israel in Haifa.

In 2025 he received the degree of Doctor of Philosophy Honoris Causa from Haifa university.

- ACUM special Jubilee Prize for a special achievement, 1987.
- Prime Minister's Prize, 1989, 2000.
- Afrat Prize, 1999.
- Ahi Prize (The Association for the Promotion of Research, Literature and Art, founded in Israel by Jews from Iraq), 1999
- Yehuda Amichai prize for Hebrew poetry (2005)
- "wine poem award" Struga Poetry Evenings, Macedonia, 2005
- Hans Berghhuis prize for poetry 2006.the Maastricht International Poetry Nights. Holand
- Ramat Gan prize for poetry 2010
- He was awarded the exemplary man of the "Lions International" in 2016
- Meir Ariel Prize for Creativity in the Hebrew Language (2019)
- Erez Biton Prize (2024)
