= Eli Amir =

Israeli writer

- אלי עמיר
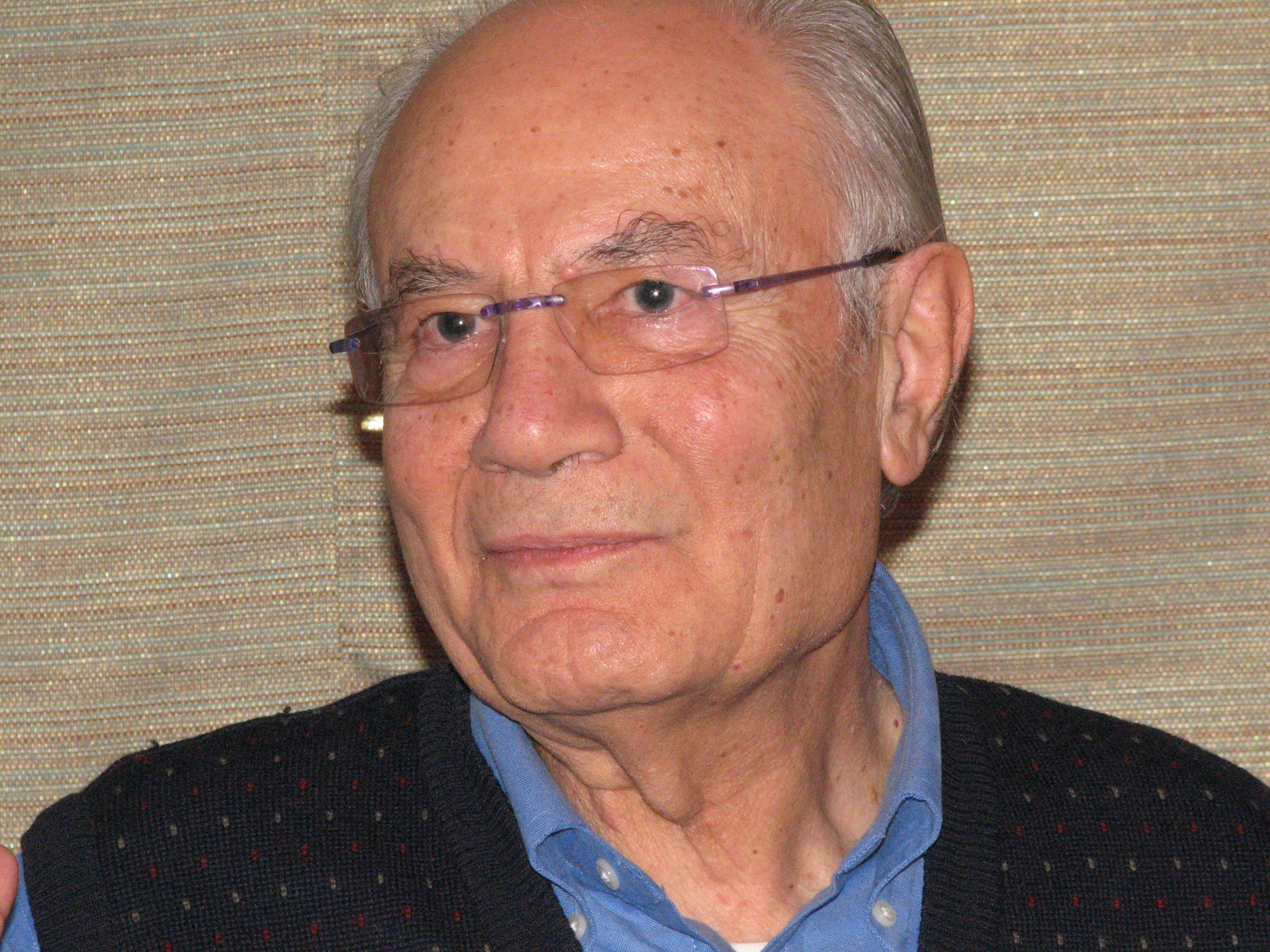
- Born: September 26, 1937 (age 88); Baghdad, Iraq
- Citizenship: Israeli
- Occupations: Writer and civil servant
- Employer: The Jewish Agency
- Title: Director General of the Youth Aliyah Department

Eli Amir (Hebrew: אלי עמיר; Arabic: ايلى عمير; September 26, 1937) is an Iraqi-born Israeli writer and civil servant. He served as director general of the Youth Aliyah Department of the Jewish Agency.

== Biography ==
Amir was born Fuad Elias Nasah Halschi in Baghdad, Iraq. He immigrated to Israel at the age of 13 with his family in 1950, and went to school in Kibbutz Mishmar HaEmek. He is now living in Gilo, Jerusalem. Amir studied at the Hebrew University of Jerusalem.

He held several acclaimed positions in the Ministry of Absorption and later managed Youth Aliyah and worked at the Jewish Agency for about twenty years. From 1975 to 1978, he served as an emissary and director of the Sephardic Federation in the United States and worked to encourage Israelis to return to Israel.

He began his literary career by publishing a story in Ma’ariv in 1975.

From 1964 to 1968 he served as adviser on Arab affairs to the Prime Minister of Israel, and as envoy for the Minister of Immigration Absorption of Israel to the United States. In 1984, he was appointed Director General of the Youth Aliyah department of the Jewish Agency.

== Literature ==
Eli Amir wrote several social novels, primarily focused on the tension between the 'other'—the Iraqi immigrant, the Palestinian, or the Sephardi—and the hegemonic Israeli society. Most of his books were successful and were translated into various languages.

His first novel Scapegoat (1983) is a semi-autobiographical story of Nuri, a 13-year-old immigrant boy from Iraq who is sent to a kibbutz and his absorption into Israeli society. The novel depicts the hardships of absorption experienced by a group of immigrant teenagers, most of them from Iraq, in a kibbutz during the 1950s. It is based on the author's own experiences in his youth. The book powerfully portrays the shock of these young boys as they encounter the new Israeli society and kibbutz ideology. It raises questions concerning religion and secularism, exile versus nationalism and Israeli identity, tradition versus technological openness and intellectual innovation. The novel achieved great success. It is taught in the Israeli high school curriculum, was translated into English and German, and was awarded the Youth Aliyah 50th Anniversary Prize (1984) and the Jewish Literature Prize in Mexico (1985).

The Dove Flyer (aka Farewell, Baghdad) (1992) is the story of 17-year-old Kabi Imari, an Iraqi Jewish boy growing up in a Zionist family. Saul's Love (1998) is a romance between Saul, born to a deeply rooted Sephardi family from Jerusalem, and Chaya, an Ashkenazi holocaust survivor. Jasmine (2005) is also largely autobiographical. The book's protagonist, Nuri Amari, who as a child had immigrated with his family from Iraq, is appointed to a government post in East Jerusalem in the wake of the Six-Day War. He meets Jasmine, a young Palestinian widow from a wealthy Christian refugee family.

Scapegoat is included in the Israeli secondary school syllabus, and was adapted into a play and television series.

== Awards ==
Amir received Youth Aliyah's Jubilee Prize (1983), the Jewish Literature Prize (in Mexico, 1985), the Ahi Award (1994), Am Oved's Jubilee Prize (1994), the Yigal Allon Prize for Outstanding Service to Society (1997), the Book Publishers Association's Platinum Prize (1998), and the Prime Minister's Prize (2002). In 2017 Amir was honored as a torchbearer in the national Israeli Independence Day ceremony.

== Political activism ==
Amir has frequently called for social justice and denounced what he has described as the deterioration of the Israeli welfare state. In 2007, when his book Jasmine was published in Arabic in Egypt, he expressed hope that more Israeli books be spread in the Arab world, saying "How can there be peace without us knowing each other?". He repeated that statement in a literary soiree held by the Israeli Embassy in Cairo. He also signed a petition calling for Prime Minister of Israel Ehud Olmert to negotiate a cease-fire with Hamas. In 2006, his name came up as a successor to President of Israel Moshe Katsav and Amir said he would consider it.

== Published works ==
=== In Hebrew ===
- Tarnegol Kaparot ("Scapegoat"), Am Oved, 1984
- Mafriah Ha-Yonim ("The Dove Flyer") Am Oved, 1992
- Ahavat Shaul ("Saul's Love"), Am Oved, 1998
- Yasmin ("Jasmine"), Am Oved, 2005
- Na'ar Ha-Ofnayim ("The Bicycle Boy"), Am Oved (2019)

=== Translated into English ===
- Amir, Eli (1987). Scapegoat: A Novel. Weidenfeld and Nicolson. p. 218.
- Amir, Eli (2010). The Dove Flyer. Halban Publishers. p. 544.
- Amir, Eli (2012). Yasmine. Halban Publishers. p. 436.

== See also ==
- History of the Jews in Iraq
- Israeli literature
