= Noa Yedlin =

Israeli writer and columnist

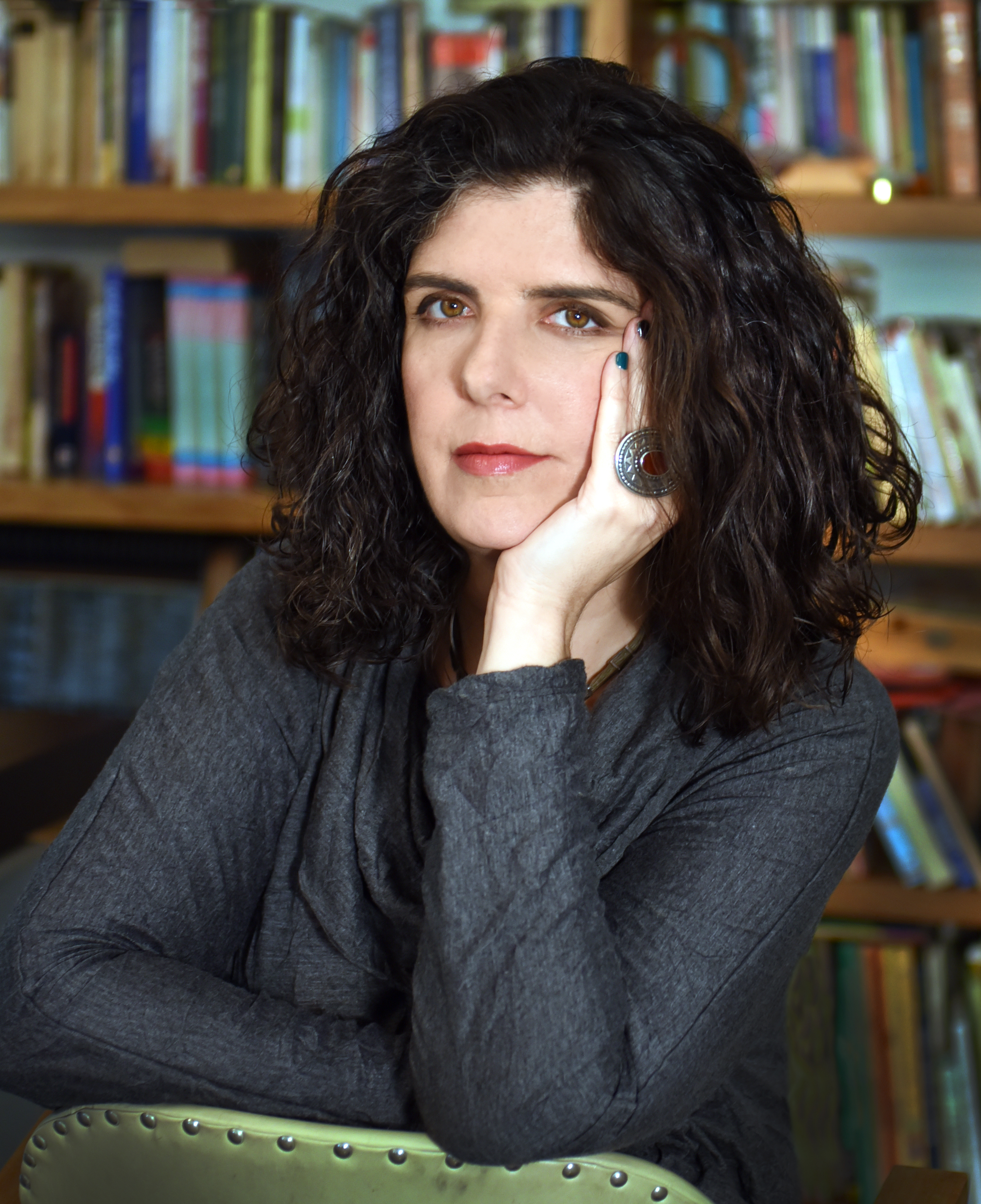
- Native name: נעה ידלין
- Born: Tel Aviv, Israel

Noa Yedlin (Hebrew: נעה ידלין) is an Israeli writer, columnist and screenwriter. Her books have been translated to several languages and won awards such as the Sapir Prize (2013) and the Prime Minister's Prize for Hebrew Literary Works (2021).

Yedlin has published numerous opinion pieces and articles, has been a presenter on television and radio, and she teaches creative writing.

== Education and career ==
Noa Yedlin was born and raised in Tel Aviv, Israel. She studied BA (1996–1999) and MA (2000–2002) in East Asian Studies in The Hebrew University of Jerusalem. In the 1990s and up until 2013 she worked as a journalist and senior editor for several Israeli newspapers. She has been teaching creative writing in Israel (Ben-Gurion University of the Negev, Beit Ariela central public library in Tel Aviv). She lives in Tel Aviv, married to Doron Nachum and has two children.

== Work ==
- The Wrong Book (הספר הלא נכון): novel, Israel: Kinneret Zmora, Dvir, 2022.
- People Like Us (אנשים כמונו): novel, Israel: Kinneret Zmora, Dvir, 2019. (German: Leute wie wir, Kein & Aber, 2021).
- Stockholm (שטוקהולם): novel, Israel: Kinneret Zmora, Dvir, 2016. (English: Stockholm, HarperVia, 2023; German: Unter Freunden Stirbt Man Nicht, Kein & Aber, 2023).
- House Arrest (בעלת הבית): novel, Israel: Kinneret Zmora, Dvir, 2013. (Arabic, 2019; Chinese Locus Publishing Company. 2018).
- Track Changes (חיי מדף): novel, Israel: Kinneret Zmora, Dvir, 2010.
- You Ask, God Replies (שאלות קשות לאללה: אתם שואלים, אלוהים משיב): novel, Israel: Hargol/Am Oved, 2005.

== Adaptations ==
- 2024 (upcoming_: People Like Us (Kan 11), TV series, written by Yedlin, based on the novel
- 2022: Antligen! (SVT Sweden), TV series, a Swedish remake of Stockholm
- 2021: A stage adaption of House Arrest at Beit Lessin Theater in Tel Aviv, based on the novel
- 2020: Unter Freunden Stirbt Man Nicht (2020, VOX, TVNOW), a German remake of the series
- 2020: Stockholm (Kan 11), TV series, written by Yedlin, based on the novel (second season)
- 2018: Stockholm (Kan 11), mini-series, written by Yedlin, based on the novel (first season)

== Awards and accolades ==
- 2013: House Arrest won the Israeli Sapir Prize.
- 2014: A writing grant from "Muza – Encouraging Creativity" in Jerusalem.
- 2016: Stockholm was shortlisted for the Sapir Prize.
- 2017: The "Am Ha'sefer" grant for translation.
- 2022: The Wrong Book was longlisted for the Sapir Prize.
- 2021: The Art Omi residency for writers
- Stockholm, the TV series based on the novel, won The Israeli Best Mini-Series TV Award
- Unter Freunden Stirbt Man Nicht, the German adaptation of Stockholm, won Best Scripted Format at 2021 International Format Awards and Best European Series at Festival de la Fiction at La Rochelle, France, 2021
- 2021: Israeli Prime Minister Award for Authors
