= Judith Katzir =

Israeli author (born 1963)

- יהודית קציר
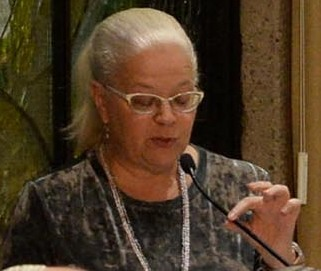
- Katzir in 2017
- Born: 1963 (age 62–63); Haifa, Israel
- Education: Tel Aviv University
- Writing career
- Language: Hebrew

Judith Katzir (Hebrew: יהודית קציר; born 1963) is an Israeli writer of novels, short stories, and children's books in Hebrew. Her works have been translated into multiple languages, including Arabic, Chinese, Dutch, English, Estonian, German, Italian, Macedonian, Polish, Portuguese, Russian, Serbian, and Spanish.

Katzir is known for her rich language, lyrical yet matter-of-fact tone, and distinct narrative style, often featuring a female second-person narrator. Her writing employs varied sentence structures, using both long and short sentences to reflect the rhythm of events. Critics have identified her as one of the first Israeli women novelists to break into what had been, until the 1980s, a male-dominated field.

== Career ==
Judith Katzir was born in 1963 in Haifa, a city whose landscapes and landmarks feature prominently in her writing. For example, her short story, "Disneyel", features the Carmel ridge, Balfour and Herzl Streets, and the blue waters of the Mediterranean sea along Haifa's coastline. Her parents were both lawyers and she is the eldest of three children.

Katzir studied literature and cinema at Tel Aviv University, and began publishing her stories in Israeli journals in the 1980s. She published her first book, Sogrim et ha-Yam, a collection of four novellas, in 1990; this appeared in English as Closing the Sea in 1992. The book was a best-seller and one of the stories in the volume, "Schlaffstunde" ("Sleeping Hours"), appeared in The Oxford Book of Hebrew Short Stories in 1996. "Schlaffstunde" has also been adapted into a one-person theater play, as well as a film entitled Family Secrets. Katzir's first novel was Le-Matisse Yesh et ha-Shemesh be-Beten ("Matisse Has the Sun in His Belly"). Katzir's most recent novel, Tzilla, appeared in 2013.

Katzir has published one play, Dvora Baron (2000), about the first Hebrew woman author. The play was performed in 2000 by the Cameri Theatre in the Tel Aviv Performing Arts Center. Katzir has taught creative writing and worked as an editor at Hakibbutz Hameuchad/Siman Kriah Publishing House.

== Literary themes and influences ==
Many of Katzir's novels and stories explore themes of female agency, often from the perspective of female adolescence. Some, such as the story "Schlaffstunde" and the novel Hineh Ani Mathillah ("Here I Begin") (2003; published in English as Dearest Anne in 2008), also evoke the Holocaust as it shapes the consciousness of her protagonists. Katzir noted in an interview that, growing up in Haifa in the 1960s and 1970s, Israeli schools did not teach children about the Holocaust. Nevertheless, she said that the event "was like a nuclear cloud above us, above our heads". Other works, like her novel Tzilla (2013), draw on elements of her family's history. Katzir has acknowledged basing the eponymous character of Tzilla on her great-grandmother, Tzilla Margolin, who was born near Minsk (now in Belarus) in 1883, lost an eye in a pogrom, and later immigrated to Palestine. The novel Tzilla focuses on the story of one woman and, in the process, offers a distinctly female perspective on Jewish settlement in Palestine. Married with five children, the real-life Tzilla met a man named Hanan who became her lover and soulmate. Hanan moved in with her family and lived with them for 25 years until the death of Tzilla's husband, whereupon Hanan and Tzilla were married.

== Social activism ==
Katzir noted in an interview that she used to be active in the Geneva Initiative, which involved Israelis and Palestinians negotiating for a future peace deal. Katzir has reported that her great-grandparents (Tzilla and Eliezer Margolin) lived in Gaza from 1919 to 1925, and that even after Tzilla's death in 1967, the family continued to maintain friendships with their former Arab neighbors and visited each other until the outbreak of the first Intifada in 1987. "I hope", she said, "I will one day be able to visit the descendants of my great-grandparents' neighbors in Gaza."

== Philosophy of reading ==
Katzir has affirmed the importance of novels in a world saturated with digital media. "In our lives, we make intimate acquaintance with only a few people: close relatives, family, a few friends. Literature gives us the opportunity to meet many more souls, characters, people we can identify with." She added that, "In a world that generates a lot of noise, books are oases of peace and quiet."

== Awards and honors ==
Katzir has won literary prizes in Israel and abroad, including the Book Publishers Association Gold and Platinum Book Prizes (1995; 1996; 1999; 2004); the Prime Minister's Prize (1996; 2007); and the French WIZO Prize (2004).

== Personal life ==
Katzir and her husband Moshe Levinson, a film producer, have two daughters. They reside in Tel Aviv.

== Bibliography ==
=== Novels ===
- Sogrim et ha-Yam (Closing the Sea), 1990
- Le-Matisse Yesh et ha-Shemesh be-Beten (Matisse Has the Sun in His Belly), 1995
- Megadlorim shel Yabasha, 1999
- Hinei Ani Mathillah (Here I Begin), 2003
- Sippur Haifa (A Story of Haifa), 2005
- Sippur Tel Aviv (A Story of Tel Aviv), 2008
- Tzilla, 2013

=== Children's books ===
- Hapiknik shel Amalia (Amalia's Picnic), 1994
- Habuah al gav haruach (The Bubble on the Back of the Wind), 2002
- Leshachrer et hapiyut (Releasing the Song), 2006
