= Michal Govrin =

Israeli author, poet and theater director

- מיכל גוברין
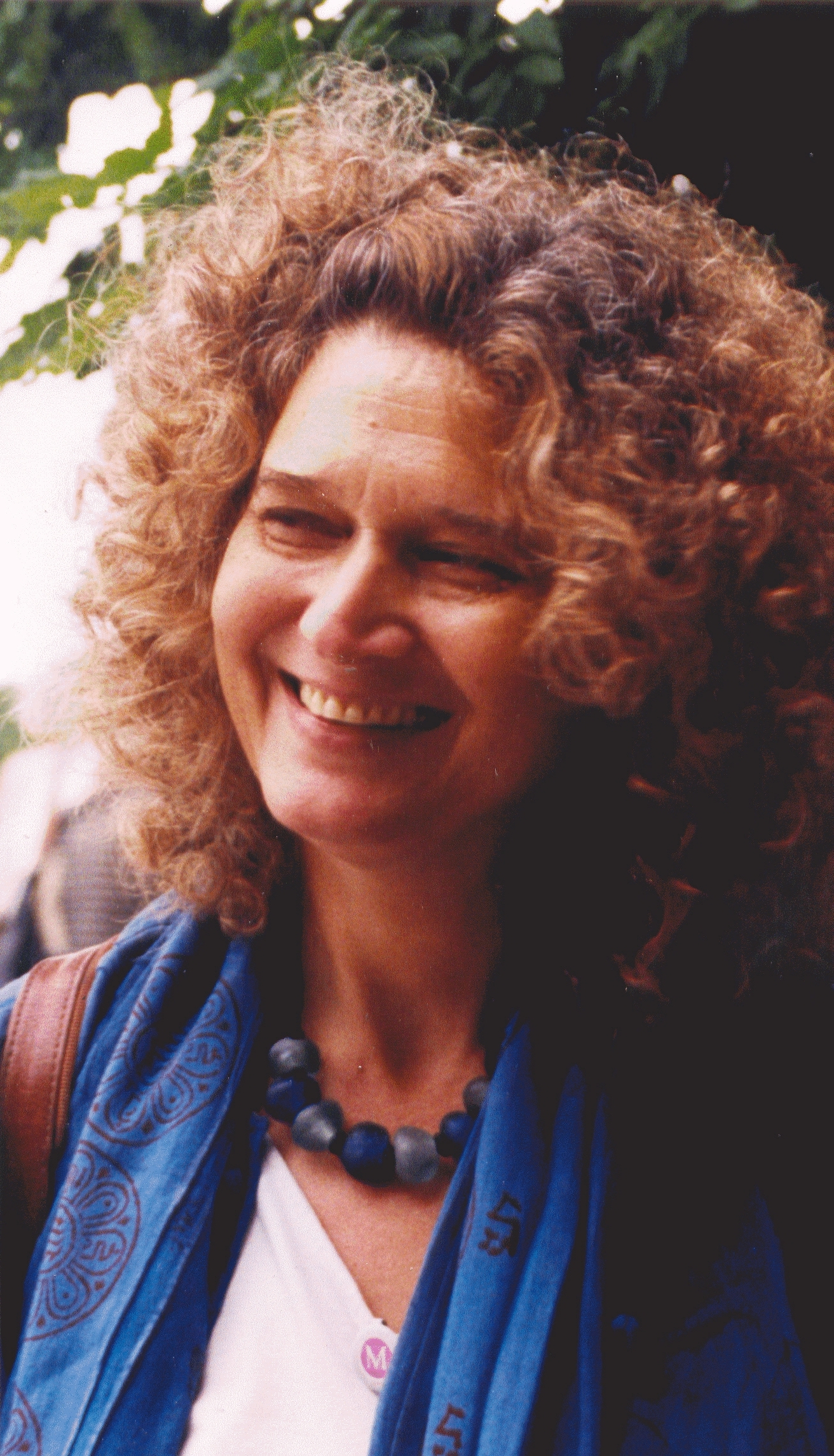
- Govrin in 2007
- Born: November 24, 1950; Tel Aviv
- Education: Tel Aviv University
- Occupations: Writer, poet, theater director
- Spouse: Haïm Brezis (1982–2024)
- Writing career
- Language: Hebrew, French, English

Michal Govrin (Hebrew: מיכל גוברין; November 24, 1950) is an Israeli author, poet and theater director.

== Biography ==
Michal Govrin was born and raised in Tel Aviv to a father who was part of the Third Aliyah and one of the founders of kibbutz Tel Yosef, and a mother who was a Holocaust survivor. She graduated in a municipal high school in Tel Aviv. Govrin has served in the IDF as a military reporter. At the Tel Aviv University she completed her undergraduate studies at the Comparative literature and Theater departments. In 1976 she completed her PhD from Paris University VIII in theater and religious studies. Her research 'Contemporary Sacred Theater, Theory and Practice', examines the theatrical aspects of Jewish mystical practices in Hasidic practices along with a study of the theater of Jerzy Grotowski and Peter Brook.

Govrin has published multiple fiction and poetry books, which have been awarded a number of prizes and were translated into several languages. In 2010 Govrin was chosen by the French Salon du Livre as one of the thirty authors that have left a mark on world literature. In 2013 she was awarded by the Ordre des Arts et des Lettres the title chevalier.

Govrin has directed plays in all the big theaters in Israel and was one of the founders of the Experimental Jewish Theater.

Govrin teaches at the Tel Aviv University, was the head of the Theater Department at Emmuna College, and has taught at the Schechter Institute of Jewish Studies in Jerusalem, at the Hebrew University of Jerusalem and at the School of Visual Theater. She was a Writer in Residence at University of Rutgers and gave an annual guest lecture at the Architecture School of Cooper Union in New York. Govrin lectures to open audiences around the world, in conferences, and in media. In 2012, she was appointed to professorship.

As part of the Van Leer Jerusalem Institute, Govrin founded in 2013 and was a director of a multidisciplinary research group 'Transmitted Memory and Fiction'. The group was committed to working out the essence of the Holocaust memory in an age when living survivors are no longer the memory carriers. In 2015 a concluding exhibition 'What is the memory? Seventy years later' was displayed at the Polonsky Academy at the Van Leer Institute in Jerusalem, along with a symposium and the production of a movie. Parallel to this project Govrin has founded and was the head of a team of historians, thinkers, and community leaders that composed a ground-breaking ceremony – the "Hitkansut" (Gathering): a "Haggadah" for the Holocaust memorial day. The gathering put forward the double attitude of "The responsibility to remember / Remember responsibly". In 2015 there were 10 experimental gatherings. Since 2016 the Gathering has been published and disseminated by the Hartman Institute and is practiced in a large number of schools, communities, working places or at homes across Israel.

== Family ==
Govrin was married to the Jewish-French mathematician Haim Brezis, whom she met in the year 1978 in Jerusalem. Brezis visited the city looking for Govrin, following an article she wrote about her journey to Poland. The couple has two daughters. Govrin lives in the Rehavia neighborhood of Jerusalem. Her uncle Akiva Govrin served as one of Israel ministers, and member of the Knesset.

== Books ==
=== Body of Prayer ===
The book is composed of three parts, written by David Shapiro, Jacques Derrida and Michal Govrin. The three are writing as secular-religious or religious-secular people about the nature and praxis of 'praying'. The book is concerned primarily with mapping the central issues surrounding the act of praying and offers, instead of 'relieving' those issues, to embrace these issues as a vital part of the praying experience itself. The book also offers a more existential notion of prayer, as something that is embedded in the act of living, deeply rooted in our 'bodies' and in the female act of 'childbirth'.

=== The Name ===
The Name is a novel whose plot traces a young woman named Amalia, daughter of a Holocaust survivor and named after his first wife who was murdered in the Holocaust.

The book was awarded the Koret Jewish Book Award and the Kugel Prize for literature, awarded by the Municipality of Holon, and was translated to English and Russian. It received positive reviews at its publication.

== List of literary and theater work ==
=== Fiction and Poetry ===
==== In Hebrew and in English translation ====
- "Hold on to the Sun: Stories and Legends (1984)" (Siman Kriaa / Hakibbutz Hameuchad, 1984) English translation, Dalya Bilu and others, Ed. Judith Gravec Miller, Feminist Press 2010)
- "The Name" (HaShem), Novel (Hasifria Hachadasha/ Hakibbutz Hameuchad 1995, and a new edition in 2013 with an afterword by Yehuda Liebes) English translation> Barbara Harshav, (Riverhead Books 1998)
- "Body of Prayer", with Jacques Derrida and David Shapiro (Dark Red Line / Hakibbutz Hameuchad and Mofet, 2013, a new and expanded version of the English original, The Cooper Union, New York, 2001)
- "Snapshots", Novel (Am Oved / Hasifria la'am 2002) English translation, Barbara Harshav, Riverhead Books, 2007

==== In Hebrew ====
- "That Very Hour" Poems, (1981)
- "That Night's Seder ", Poemx (Habama, 1989)
- "Word's Bodies", Poems (Hakibbutz Hameuchad, 1991)
- "The Making of the Sea, a Chronicle of Exegesis", with etchings by Liliane Klapisch (Harel 1998, Carmel 2000)
- "So Said Jerusalem: Hymns and Poems", with original drawings by Orna Millo (Devari-m / Carmel 2008)
- "The Shores of Ashkelon", Novel (Hakibbutz Hameuchad 2013)
- "Body of Prayer", essay (Hebrew version) with Jacques Derrida and David Shapiro (Hakibbutz Hameuchad, 2013)
- "Jerusalem Place of Desire, Journey to the Myth", essay (Hakibbutz Hameuchad, 2019)

=== Editing ===
- "We Were As Dreamers" (Haeinu Kecholmim), Family Saga. Introduction: Asaf, D. (Carmel Publishing House, Jerusalem, 2005)
- "But There Was Love, Shaping the Memory of the Shoah" editor with Dana Haifetz-Freibach, Etty BenZaken, (Carmel 2021)

==== Founder and editor of Devari-m Series (with Laurberbaum, M.) ====
- Schimmel, H., Cassida (with drawings by Tulkovski, Z.), (Devari-m/Carmel, Jerusalem, 2009)
- Liebes, Y., Mnemosyne, Translations of classical Poetry, (with works on paper by Altholz, S.) (Devari-m/Carmel, Jerusalem, 2011)
- Salhoov, S., Torat Ha'Khitukhim, poems (with works on paper by Gordon, M. and Petel, E.) (Devari-m/Carmel, Jerusalem, 2011)
- Laurnberbaum, M, Ma'atakim, translations of English Poetry (with works on paper by Sharon Etgar) (Devari-m/Carmel, 2013)
- Levin, G, Levant, translated from English by Zali Gurevitch, (Devari-m/Carmel, 2016)

=== Theatre directing ===
==== Directing, adaptation and translation at the Repertoire Theater ====
- "The condemned Man's Bicycle", Fernando Arrabal, translation and direction. Set: Moshe Sternfeld, Theater of the Hatzarim, Tel Aviv University (1972).
- “The Emigrants”, Slawomir Mrojek, translation and direction. Music: Joseph Tal, Costume and set: Moshe Sternfeld, Lighting: Ben-Zion Monitz, Movement: Rut Ziv-Eyal, Cast: Shabtai Konorti and Avinoam Mor-Haim, The Khan Theater (1976). The production won the "Margalit Prize" 1977.
- “In the Bloom of Her Day”, S.I. Agnon, adaptation, and direction. Set: Frida Goldberg, Music: Max Stern, Costume: Judith Westmor, Performed by Rachel Levi, The Khan Theater (1977).
- "Mercier and Camier", Samuel Beckett, adaptation and direction. Hebrew Translation: Mulli Meltzer Adaptation and Directing by: Michal Govrin, Set and props: Doron Livne, Costumes and props: Anat Palenker, Lighting: Ben-Zion Munitz, Movement: Raffi Goldwasser, Poster & Programme Design: Raphi Etgar, Cast: Aaron Almog, Sasson Gabbai, Avinoam Mor-Haim, Neta Plotzky, Uri Avrahami, Shalom Keinan, Uri Avrahami, Neta Plotzky, Danni Mudja, The Khan Theater (1979).
- “The Work-Room, L'Atelier”, Jean Claude Grumberg, translation and direction. Set: Moshe Sternfeld, Costumes: Genia Malkin, Music: Josef Tal, Lighting: Michael Lieberman, Song: Rene Mokadi. Cast: Shmuel Segal, Rachel Shor, Dalia Friedland, Ada Tal, Yael Druianov, Miki Kam, Adi Lev, Rolf Brin, Itzik Saidoff, Misha Natan, Shlomi Almagor, Roni Chen, Dekel Granit, Boaz Perlman, The Habima National Theatre (1981)
- “Happy Days”, Samuel Beckett, direction. Hebrew Translation: Mulli Meltzer, Set and Costumes: Frieda Klapholtz, Doron Livne, Lighting: Avi Tzabari, Cast: Hana Meron, Uri Levi, The Kameri Theatre, Tel Aviv, (1985).

==== Directing and adaptation of Experimental Jewish Theater ====
- “The Harvest of Folie”, Rabbi Nachman of Bratslav, adaptation and directing. Production: Judith Graves Miller, Music: Daniel Shalit, Set and costumes: Abraham Pincas, Joelle Pincas, Masks: Anne-Marie Paul, Cast: Françoise Bette, Arlette Chouraqui, Daniel Clark, Boris Endako, David Mergui, Shoshana Segev, Renaud Sylvestrie, The 7 Beggars company, Paris (1974).
- "Variations on Morning", The Jewish Morning Prayer; Samuel Beckett, translation, adaptation and directing. Set and costume: Ada Hameirit, Lighting: Yoram Ben-Yair, Cast: the students of the production workshop of the Department of Theatre, The Hebrew University, Jerusalem, The David Citadel (1980).
- "The Journey of the Year", editing and directing. Research, dramatization and performance: the students of the Theater Department, The Hebrew University, Design: Frieda Klapholtz, Musical arrangements: Andre Hajdu, Musical direction and flute: Akiva Ben-Horin, violin: Tania Susskind, guitar: Roger Yochai. Visitor Actors: Victor Attar, Yossi Kenan, The Jerusalem Khan Theatre. at The First International Festival of Jewish Theater, Outdoor performances: TAU Campus, Jerusalem Theater Grove (1982).
