= Gail Hareven =

Israeli author

- גיל הראבן
- Born: 1959 (age 66–67); Jerusalem, Israel
- Writing career
- Genre: novel

Gail Hareven (Hebrew: גַּיִל הַרְאֶבֶן; born 1959 Jerusalem) is an Israeli author.

== Biography ==
Gail Hareven studied at Ben-Gurion University of the Negev and Shalom Hartman Institute. Her work appears in The New Yorker.

She has published eleven books. In 2002, she was awarded the Sapir Prize for Literature for The Confessions of Noa Weber, about the struggle between feminist ideology and yearning for love and spirituality.

The Confessions of Noa Weber is her first book translated into English. It won the 2009 Best Translated Book Award for the Hebrew to English translation by Dalya Bilu. According to one literary critic, "Hareven's insights into desperate yearning are so dead on and painfully astute, the experience can be eviscerating. That the work is also witty and compelling will leave American readers, encountering Hareven for the first time, almost certainly pining for more."

In 2012, Hareven was an artist-in-residence at Mount Holyoke College.

In 2013, Hareven received the Prime Minister's Prize for Hebrew Literary Works.

== Published works ==
=== English ===
- The confessions of Noa Weber: a novel, Translated Dalya Bilu, Melville House, 2009, ISBN 9781933633688
- Hope, If We Insist
- Lies, First Person, Open Letter Books, 2015, ISBN 9781940953038

=== Hebrew ===
ארוחת צהרים עם אמא, סיפורים, 1993.
הסיפור האמיתי, רומן, 1994.
תקווה אם נתעקש, 1996.
מוזה, רומן, 1995.
הבוקר הרגתי איש, קובץ סיפורים, 1997.
הדרך לגן עדן, קובץ סיפורים, מדע בדיוני, 1999.
שאהבה נפשי, רומן, 2001. עליו זכתה בפרס ספיר, 2002.
חיי מלאך, רומן, 2003.
האיש הנכון, רומן, 2005.
שפת קיר, אלבום ציורי גרפיטי (יחד עם עליזה אולמרט), 2007
השקרים האחרונים של הגוף, רומן, 2008
לב מתעורר, רומן, 2010

== See also ==
- Israeli literature
- Hebrew literature
