= List of Israeli poets =

The poets listed below were either born in the Israel or else published much of their poetry while living in that country.

== A ==
- Ada Aharoni (born 1933)
- Karen Alkalay-Gut (born 1945)
- Nathan Alterman (1910-1970)
- Yehuda Amichai (1924–2000)
- Irit Amiel (1931–2021)
- Aharon Amir (1923–2008)
- Dana Amir (born 1966)
- Aharon Appelfeld (1932–2018)
- Maya Arad (born 1971)
- Naim Araidi (1950–2015)
- Dan Armon (born 1948)
- Yaron Avitov (born 1957)
- Lucy Ayoub (born 1992)

== B ==
- Rivka Basman Ben-Hayim (1925–2023)
- Miri Ben-Simhon
- Rachel Boymvol (1914–2000)
- Avraham Ben-Yitzhak (1883–1950)
- Shmuel Ben-Artzi (1914–2011)
- Rachel Tzvia Back (born 1960)
- Ya'qub Bilbul (1920–2003)
- Erez Biton (born 1942)
- Halina Birenbaum (born 1929)
- Yocheved Bat-Miriam (1901–1980)

== C ==
- Sami Shalom Chetrit (born 1960)
- Amichai Chasson (born 1987)
- Miriam Barukh Chalfi (1917–2002)
- Edith Covensky (born 1945)
- Raquel Chalfi
- Inbal Eshel Cahansky (born 1977)
- Ya'akov Cahan (1881–1960)
- T. Carmi (1925–1994)

== D ==
- Fatima Dhiab (born 1951)

== E ==
- Yael Eisenberg (born 1991)

== F ==
- Jacob Fichman (1881–1958)
- Robert Friend (1913–1998)
- Ezra Fleischer (1928–2006)

== G ==
- Gilla Gerzon
- Hagit Grossman (born 1976)
- Michal Govrin (born 1950)
- Dana Goldberg (born 1979)
- Leah Goldberg (1911-1970)
- Mordechai Geldman (1946–2021)
- Yael Globerman (born 1954)
- Amir Gilboa (1917–1984)
- Haim Gouri (1923–2018)
- Mikhail Gendelev (1950–2009)
- Igor Guberman (born 1936)

== H ==
- Dalia Hertz (born 1942)
- Benjamin Harshav (1928–2015)
- Ayin Hillel (1926–1990)
- Yair Hurvitz (1941–1988)
- Hedva Harechavi (born 1941)
- Paul Hartal (born 1936)
- Amira Hess (born 1943)
- Shlomo Herberg (1884–1966)
- Galit Hasan-Rokem (born 1945)
- Sabine Huynh (born 1972)
- Tehila Hakimi (born 1982)

== K ==
- Radu Klapper (1937–2006)
- Yehudit Kafri (born 1935)
- Adi Keissar (born 1980)
- Olga Kirsch (1924–1997)
- Yuri Kolker (born 1946)
- Ronen Altman Kaydar (born 1972)
- Abba Kovner (1918–1987)
- Shirley Kaufman (1923–2016)
- Admiel Kosman (born 1957)
- Nidaa Khoury (born 1959)
- Shlomo Kalo (1928–2014)

== L ==
- Yitzhak Lamdan (1899–1954)
- Giora Leshem (1940–2011)
- Malka Locker (1887–1990)
- Yitzhak Laor (born 1948)

== M ==
- Nava Macmel-Atir (born 1964)
- Margalit Matitiahu (born 1935)
- Rikva Miriam
- Agi Mishol (born 1946)
- Itzik Manger (1901–1969)
- Dory Manor (born 1971)
- Yakir Ben Moshe (born 1973)
- Efrat Mishori (born 1964)

== N ==
- Vaan Nguyen (born 1982)
- Yehezkel Nafshy (born 1977)
- Erich Neumann (1905–1960)
- Yonit Naaman (born 1975)
- Ron Nesher (born 1983)
- Tal Nitzán (born 1961)
- Zvi Nir (born 1946)

== O ==
- Mariya Ocher (born 1986)

== P ==
- Dan Pagis (1930–1986)
- Israel Pincas (born 1935)
- Hava Pinhas-Cohen (born 1955)
- Ravid Plotnik (born 1988)
- Haviva Pedaya (born 1957)

== R ==
- Alex Rif (born 1986)
- Abraham Regelson (1896–1981)
- Esther Raab (1894–1981)
- Tuvya Ruebner (1924–2019)
- Yonatan Ratosh (1908–1981)
- Janice Rebibo (1950–2015)

== S ==
- Zoya Semenduyeva (1929–2020)
- Ayat Abou Shmeiss (born 1984)
- Shin Shifra (1931–2012)
- Esther Shkalim (born 1954)
- Avner Shats (born 1959)
- Tal Slutzker (born 1986)
- Zalman Shneour (1887–1959)
- Gali-Dana Singer (born 1962)
- Amir Segal (born 1980)
- Ronny Someck (born 1951)
- Avraham Shlonsky (1900–1973)
- Rami Saari (born 1963)
- Abraham Sutzkever (1913–2010)
- Bracha Serri
- Avraham Stern (1907–1942)
- David Shimoni (1891–1956)
- Mati Shemoelof (born 1972)
- Shva Salhoov (born 1963)
- Nava Semel (1954–2017)
- David Dean Shulman (born 1949)
- Gershom Schocken (1912–1990)

== T ==
- Gabriel Talphir (1901–1990)
- Shimon Tzabar (1926–2007)
- Omer Toledano (born 1980)

== V ==
- Sam Vaknin (born 1961)

== W ==
- Yona Wallach (1944–1985)

== Z ==
- Nurit Zarchi (born 1941)
- Tawfiq Ziad (1929–1994)
- Boaz Zippor (born 1972)
- Linda Stern Zisquit
- Benny Ziffer (born 1953)

== See also ==
- Israeli poetry
- List of Hebrew-language poets
- List of poets
- List of years in poetry
