= Vovan and Lexus =

Russian comedy duo

Vladimir Aleksandrovich Kuznetsov
- Born: November 11, 1986 (age 40); Novorossiysk, Russian SFSR, USSR

Aleksei Vladimirovich Stolyarov
- Born: September 16, 1987 (age 39); Yekaterinburg, Russian SFSR, USSR

Vladimir Aleksandrovich Kuznetsov (Russian: Владимир Александрович Кузнецов, or Krasnov, nicknamed Vovan222, born 11 November 1986) and Aleksei Vladimirovich Stolyarov (born 16 September 1987), jointly known as Vovan and Lexus (Russian: Вован и Лексус, romanized: Vovan i Leksus), are Russian comedians noted for their prank telephone calls to prominent individuals.

The duo often prank those who are critical of the Russian government or Russian foreign policy, particularly non-Russians; they have been called state actors for the Russian government or the Federal Security Service (FSB), Russia's principal security agency, a claim the comedians deny.

== Background ==
=== Vovan ===
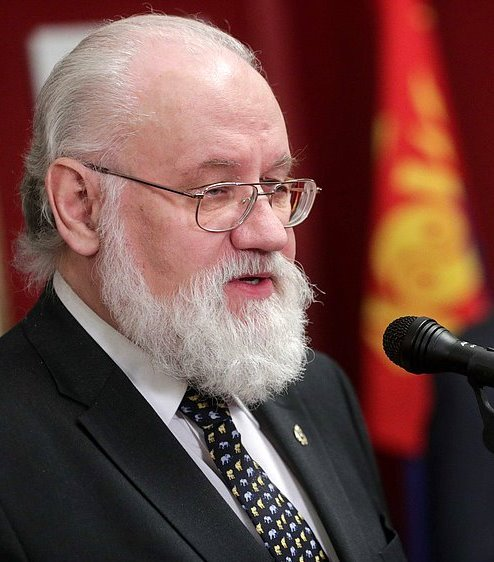
Vovan gained popularity in Russia through his prank on Russian official Vladimir Churov.

Vovan came to public attention in late 2011, when after that year's controversial parliamentary elections in Russia, he telephoned the chairman of Russia's Central Election Commission Vladimir Churov, introducing himself as Deputy Prime Minister Arkady Dvorkovich and almost convinced Churov that President Dmitry Medvedev intended to fire him. In June 2012, he phoned Vitaly Mutko, the Russian Minister of Sports, and persuaded him to apologise for the drunken behaviour of athletes.

=== Comedy duo formation ===
In 2014, Vovan and Lexus began to work together. They telephoned President of Moldova Nicolae Timofti, posing as Georgian politician Mikheil Saakashvili, and spoke with General Kevin McNeely in the United States, to whom Vovan introduced himself as the Minister of Internal Affairs of Ukraine Arsen Avakov. McNeely disclosed to the pranksters information about the supply of U.S. military aid to Ukraine during the ongoing Russo-Ukrainian War.

=== Elton John prank ===
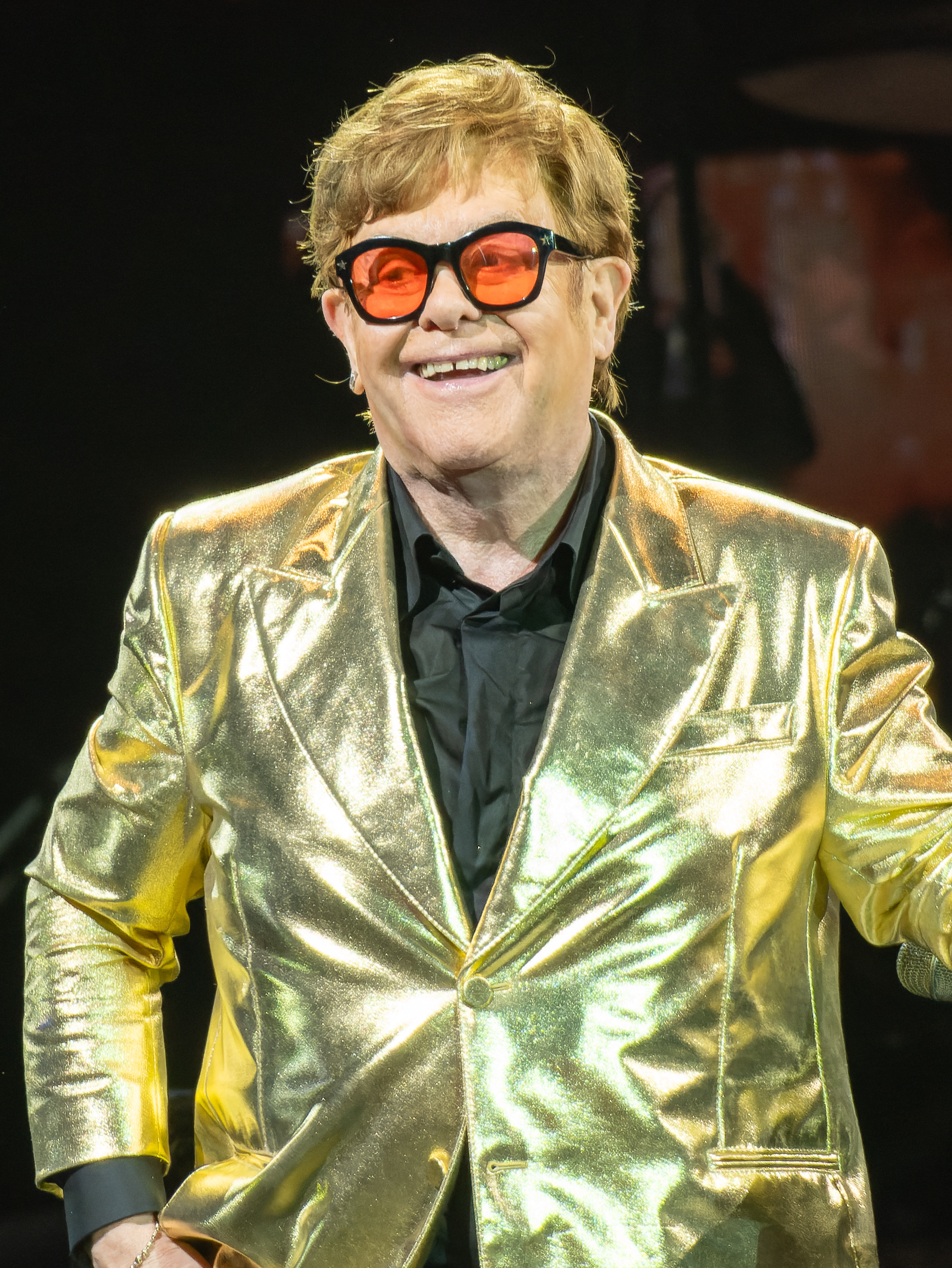
British singer Elton John was subject to one of their pranks. As a result, Russian president Vladimir Putin apologised to John.

In September 2015, Vovan and Lexus played a telephone prank on the British musician Elton John; Vovan impersonated Russian president Vladimir Putin and Lexus pretended to be his translator. They claimed to be discussing the rights of gay people in Russia. (Note: Gay rights in Russia had been under increased scrutiny from John and many in the West since an anti-gay-propaganda law had been passed by the State Duma in 2013. In defending the law in the lead-up to the Sochi Olympics in 2014, Putin cited the Russian public's support of Elton John – who is gay – and his music to dispute the notion Russia is homophobic. John responded by offering to introduce Putin to Russians he said were victimised and abused under the legislation. John had previously expressed an interest in talking to Putin on the issue but thought the possibility of such was unlikely.) Erroneously believing the call to be genuine, John, on Instagram, made a post congratulating Putin for having contacted John to discuss the issue. Putin's press secretary Dmitry Peskov denied the conversation took place, and Putin telephoned Elton John apologising for the prank and describing the pranksters as "harmless".

=== Other prominent individuals ===
By 2015, Vovan and Lexus had pranked many prominent people, including former Soviet leader Mikhail Gorbachev, U.S. statesman John McCain, Soviet dissident Valeriya Novodvorskaya, Russian politician Vladimir Medinsky, Ukrainian politician Vitali Klitschko, viral Russian politician Natalia Poklonskaya, Russian ballerina Anastasia Volochkova, Russian actor Aleksei Panin, and Russian politician Vitaly Milonov.

In February 2016, Vovan and Lexus pranked President of Turkey Recep Tayyip Erdoğan; they introduced themselves as Ukrainian politicians Petro Poroshenko and Arseniy Yatsenyuk. Since April 2016, Vovan was co-host of weekly television prank show Zvonok ("[the] Call") on the Russian channel NTV. He co-presented the show with Lexus and Mikhail Gendelev. In July 2019, Vovan and Lexus called President of North Macedonia Zoran Zaev and they introduced themselves as Poroshenko.

In early 2018, they pranked U.S. Representative Adam Schiff. Posing as the head of the Ukrainian parliament Andriy Parubiy, they said he had compromising nude photographs of U.S. President Donald Trump after a claim Trump visited Moscow in November 2013 and was provided an escort with Russian singer and model Olga Buzova at the 2013 Miss Universe pageant in Moscow. Vovan and Lexus also said Buzova met with Trump in New York sometime later, where a supposed affair took place. Afterwards, Schiff was convinced Russian President Vladimir Putin was made aware of the photographs by the duo, who said Ksenia Sobchak provided Buzova with an escort to Trump and that Sobchak was Putin's god-daughter, that Vovan and Lexus had secretly visited Ukraine, and that the Ukrainian government had access to the materials. The duo said Putin had a mediator, Russian singer Arkady Ukupnik, who met ex-advisor of President Trump Michael Flynn on Brighton Beach, Brooklyn, and used a secret password, "Weather is good on Deribasovskaya" – the name of a Russian-American film – and that Ukupnik told Flynn the compromising photographs would not be released if Trump would cancel all sanctions against Russia.

In 2019, during the Venezuelan presidential crisis, they pranked Speaker of the National Assembly of Venezuela Juan Guaidó, and self-proclaimed interim president of the country, introducing themselves as Ueli Maurer, President of the Swiss Confederation. They told Guaidó that Nicolás Maduro had accounts in a fictitious Swiss bank and asked him to provide Swiss authorities with a legal request to freeze Maduro's assets. Vovan and Lexus also called U.S. Special Representative for Venezuela Elliott Abrams, who dismissed the possibility of military action by the U.S. in the country during the call.

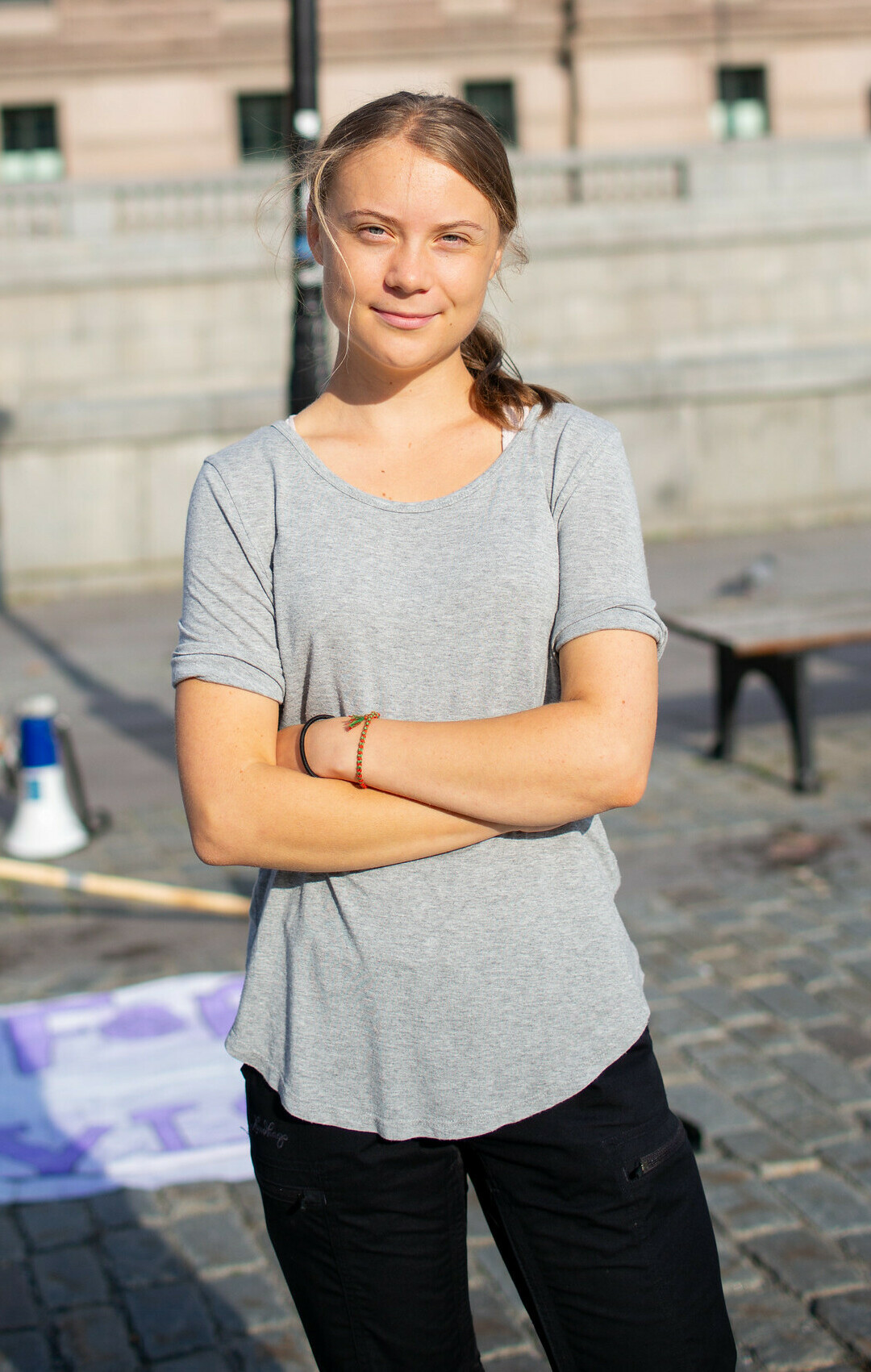
The pair impersonated environmental activist Greta Thunberg numerous times.

In 2020, Vovan and Lexus made two telephone calls to Prince Harry, Duke of Sussex, and introduced themselves as Greta Thunberg and her father. They also impersonated the Thunbergs in calls to Maxine Waters, an American politician and Canadian prime minister Justin Trudeau. Impersonating Thunberg and her father, Vovan and Lexus also mentioned the shooting down of Ukraine International Airlines Flight 752 and urged Canada to leave NATO.

Posing as Thunberg during the 2020 Democratic Party presidential primaries in the U.S., Vovan and Lexus pranked Democratic presidential candidate U.S. Senator Bernie Sanders. In January 2020 the duo also pranked presidential candidate Senator Kamala Harris, who later became the Vice presidential nominee for Joe Biden. The duo posing as Greta and her father claimed that they had a secret recording of a secret encounter with U.S. President Donald Trump at the September 2019 United Nations meeting they claimed that Trump told Greta “You will never achieve your goal” and they claimed that they were in Canada and would be returning to the US soon and that they should arrange a meeting to provide copies of the recording to help Kamala in her campaign. The duo also pranked singer Billie Eilish and actor Joaquin Phoenix. In April 2021, Vovan and Lexus approached politicians in a number of European countries by impersonating Leonid Volkov, a Russian opposition politician and chief of staff of Russian opposition leader Alexei Navalny's campaign. It was reported they used deepfake technology to impersonate Volkov. They told The Verge they had used a look-alike rather than deepfakes.

In October 2020, Vovan and Lexus impersonated Sviatlana Tsikhanouskaya, the Belarusian opposition leader, in a virtual video conference with Danish lawmakers. In July 2021, President of the U.S. National Endowment for Democracy (NED) Carl Gershman was the subject of a hoax by Vovan and Lexus, who convinced Gershman and other NED officials they were speaking to Tsikhanouskaya and an aide. Gersham said the NED "support[ed] many, many groups and we have a very, very active program throughout the country", and NED had contact with the chief aide to Alexei Navalny. The NED official in charge of its work in Belarus said the NED had helped inspire that year's protests against Lukashenko.

In November 2022, on the night following the 2022 missile explosion in Poland, they pranked Polish President Andrzej Duda into thinking he was talking with Emmanuel Macron. Duda's office later stated that he realized he was speaking with an impersonator and ended the conversation.

In June 2022, they pranked J. K. Rowling, making her believe she was on a Zoom call with Ukrainian President Volodymyr Zelenskyy and discussing the ongoing Russian invasion of Ukraine.

In February 2023, they announced that they pranked Angela Merkel, pretending to be Petro Poroshenko. The full conversation has not been released.

In March 2023 they pranked President of the European Central Bank Christine Lagarde while posing as Volodymyr Zelenskyy, conversing in English, inducing her to admit that the e-euro might be introduced in October in spite of some early protests and that "control" played a significant role in its planning.

In November 2023 they pranked Italian Prime Minister Giorgia Meloni while posing as a senior African Union official, inducing her to admit that European leaders were tired of the war in Ukraine and want to broker a deal with the Kremlin, saying that "we need a way out". In March 2024, the International Olympic Committee announced that its president Thomas Bach was the victim of Russian prank calls "purporting to be from the African Union Commission appear to have been made by the very same group that has already attacked a number of global political leaders and other high-ranking personalities in the same way". They discussed a ban on Russian athlete parades in the aftermath of Russia's invasion of Ukraine. One recording, which featured Bach saying that Russian athletes who had made statements supporting the Russian government would be excluded from the Olympic Games, was released in April 2024. This led Russian Foreign Ministry spokeswoman Maria Zakharova to accuse Bach of "enter[ing] into a political-administrative and, apparently, criminal conspiracy with one specific party [Ukraine] to exclude strong sports competitors from international competitions".

In February 2025 they called Johann Wadephul, a representative of the German Parliament and member of the Christian Democratic Union of Germany, pretending to be employees of the Ukrainian president Volodymyr Zelenskyy. In the 20 minute call, they talked about military support and the delivery of Taurus cruise missiles.

== Controversies ==
In December 2023, Vovan and Lexus called Boris Akunin and Dmitry Bykov, pretending to be representatives of the Ukrainian Government, and released the recordings of Akunin and Bykov expressing their support for Ukraine. The response in Russia was negative: many Russian publishing booksellers, including publishing company AST, ceased publication and distribution of Akunin's and Bykov's works. One of the few booksellers that continued to distribute Akunin's books, Zakharov Books, came under investigation by the Investigative Committee of Russia. Russian politician Andrey Gurulyov (United Russia) called Akunin an "enemy" that "must be destroyed".

Meduza said of Vovan and Lexus; "for some reason, their spoofs always seem to serve the interests of Russia's authorities". Vovan and Lexus told the website they would never play pranks on Putin allies such as head of Chechnya Ramzan Kadyrov or Primate of the Russian Orthodox Church Patriarch Kirill.

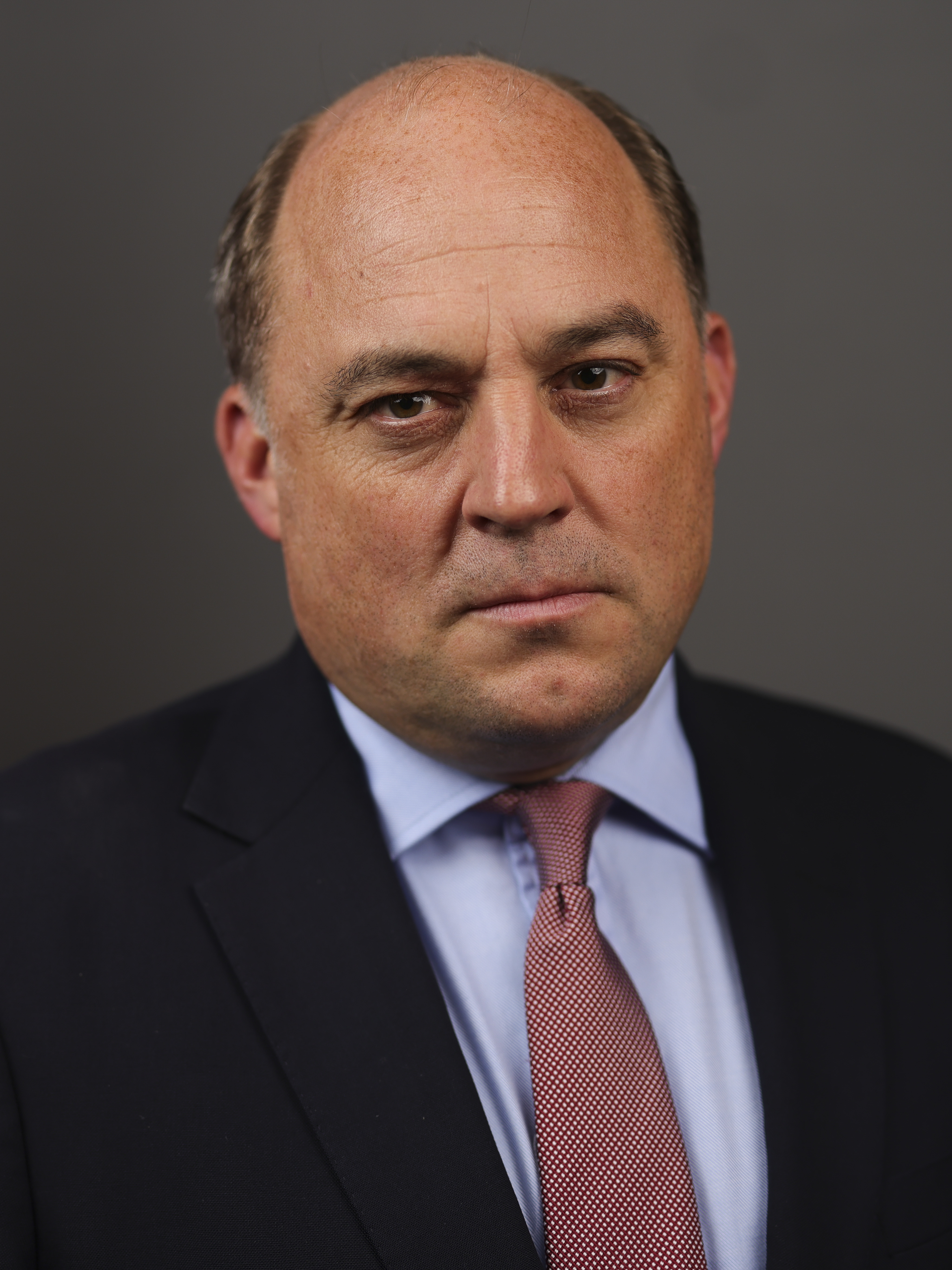
British defence secretary Ben Wallace was pranked by the duo in 2022, during the Russian invasion of Ukraine, leading to Vovan and Lexus's channel being removed from YouTube.

As many of the people they prank are those critical of the Russian government or Russian foreign policy, particularly non-Russians, critics say that Kuznetsov and Stolyarov work for the Russian authorities or Russia's security service (the FSB), or are otherwise involved in the Kremlin's foreign political interference programmes. The British government has repeated this claim. The duo deny being state actors, and Vovan has stated that he is free as to whom he pranks and does not work for hire, but that friends sometimes suggest who they prank next. After the prank on Italian prime minister Giorgia Meloni, Vovan said "For the mass media it is much more advantageous to say that the head of state was fooled not by two simple people, but that it was a very difficult intelligence operation in which a lot of money, time and resources were invested".

In Russia, some have called Vovan's pranks "telephone hooliganism". After participating with them in a program on state television channel Zvezda, Russian journalist and television presenter Mikhail Kozhukhov called the duo "a disgrace to the profession to which I belong".

=== YouTube ban and migration to Rutube ===
In 2022, during the Russian invasion of Ukraine, clipped footage of British defence secretary Ben Wallace in a prank call by Vovan and Lexus was released online. Vovan and Lexus impersonated Ukrainian prime minister Denys Shmyhal, saying Ukraine wished to promote its own nuclear deterrent to protect itself from Russia, a claim previously made by the Russian government. Vovan and Lexus also called British home secretary Priti Patel. After this prank, on 26 March 2022, YouTube banned Vovan and Lexus, and on 22 March that year, the British Ministry of Defence had called for YouTube to remove all videos of calls by Vovan and Lexus. Following the ban, the two prankers opened up the channel on Rutube and continued publishing new content.
