= Revazov =

The surname Revazov (Russian: Ревазов), female form Revazova (Russian: Ревазова) is a patronymic derivation from the Georgian given name Revaz.

The surname may refer to:

- Arsen Revazov (born 1966), Russian writer and photographer
