= Kozhukhov =

Kozhukhov (Russian: Кожухов) is a Russian masculine surname, its feminine counterpart is Kozhukhova. It may refer to

- Alexandr Kozhukhov (1942–2008), Russian handball player
- Mikhail Kozhukhov (born 1956), Russian journalist and television presenter
