= Hamutal Bar-Yosef =

- חמוטל בר-יוסף
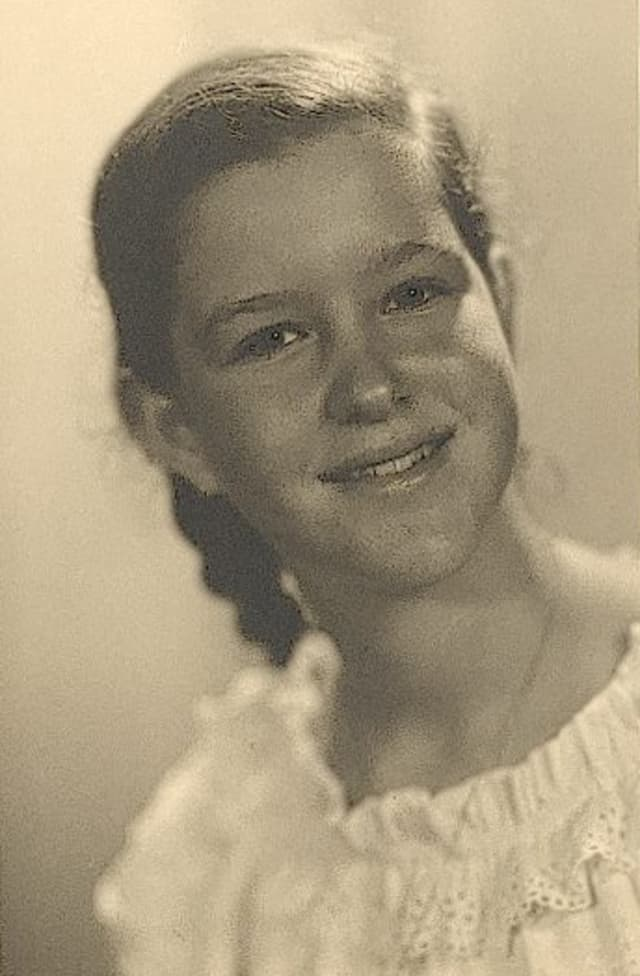
- Born: Hamutal Burnshtein; June 13, 1940 (age 86); Tel Yosef, Mandatory Palestine
- Education: Hebrew University of Jerusalem
- Occupations: Poet; author; translator; literary scholar
- Spouse: Yosef Bar-Yosef (m. 1960; div. 1993)
- Children: 4
- Writing career
- Language: Hebrew
- Notable awards: Brenner Prize (2005); Yehuda Amichai Prize (2011); ACUM Lifetime Achievement Award (2013)

Hamutal Bar-Yosef (Hebrew: חמוטל בר-יוסף;) is an Israeli poet, writer, translator, literary scholar and professor emerita at Ben-Gurion University of the Negev. She has taught at universities and academic institutions in Israel and abroad, including New York , Paris, Moscow, Kyiv, Stockholm and Poznań.

== Biography ==
Bar-Yosef was born in Kibbutz Tel Yosef, Mandatory Palestine to Avigdor & Munia Burshtein. Her brother was killed in the 1948 war. She married the playwright Yosef Bar-Yosef in 1960, and the couple had four children before divorcing in 1993. Since 1976 she has lived in Jerusalem.

== Education and academic career ==
Between 1957 and 1960, Bar-Yosef studied for a Bachelor of Arts degree at the Hebrew University of Jerusalem. Alongside teaching at a secondary school, she worked in the Curriculum Department of the Israeli Ministry of Education and Culture between 1971 and 1985.

She received a Master of Arts degree in Comparative Literature from the Hebrew University of Jerusalem in 1977 and completed her Ph.D., graduating Magna cum laude, in 1984. She subsequently served as an assistant professor at the university for three years.

In 1987, Bar-Yosef joined Ben-Gurion University of the Negev. In 1993 she established the university's M.A. program in Creative writing, regarded as an innovative graduate program in the field. In 1997 she was appointed a full professor and, in addition to academic teaching, conducted poetry-writing workshops.

She has also served as a visiting professor and lecturer at universities in New York , Paris, Moscow, Kyiv, Stockholm and Poznań, as well as at the Shalom Hartman Institute, Herzog College and the Ein Prat: the Academy for Leadership.

Bar-Yosef has published scholarly books and articles on Hebrew literature and Yiddish Symbolism, Decadence, Jewish-Christian literary relations, mysticism in twentieth-century Hebrew poetry, and the Russian context of modern Hebrew literature. Her studies have examined the works of writers such as Uri Nissan Gnessin, Zelda, and Leah Goldberg. Some of her scholarly books have been translated into other languages, including works on mysticism in modern Hebrew poetry (English, 2010) and the Russian context of modern Hebrew literature (Russian, 2013). In addition to her academic research, she has published collections of literary essays (Ta'amei ha'Mikrah, 2006) and reviews (Kriot u-Shrikot, 2005), also edited an anthology of modern Hebrew literature in Russian translation, published by the Russian State University for the Humanities in 1999.

== Literary career ==
She began publishing Poetry in 1959. Her poetry collections include If Not in a Hurry (1971), Taking Air (1978), Only the Green (1981), Jumping Jacks (1984), In the Crush (1990), The No (1998), Night, Morning (2000), Food (2002), Recovery (2004), Selected and New Poems (2010), 15 Epitaphs, 13 Woodcuts (2010), Portraits (2012), A Whistle (2014), Motar (2015), Without Many Words (2018), The Miraculous Mistake (2020), Poems 2020–2023 (2023), Epitaphs (2025), and Tohelet (2026).

Bar-Yosef's poetry has been translated into several languages. Book-length collections of her poems have been published in Russian (Saint Petersburg, 2004; Moscow, 2014; Haifa, 2024), English (New York, 2008, 2014, and 2025), French (Paris, 2013), Arabic (Cairo, 2010; Paris, 2013; Ar'ara, 2025), Spanish (Madrid-Monterrey, 2013), Hungarian (Budapest, 2009), Romanian (Suceava, 2017), Georgian (Tbilisi, 2019), and Polish (2026). Individual poems have also been translated into German, Ukrainian, Italian, Danish, Swedish, and Yiddish and published in literary journals and anthologies.

Several composers have set her poems to music, including Eran El-Bar, Yael Tai, Albert Sofer, Oded Zehavi, Neta Aloni, Rotem Sherman, Noa Shemer, Alon Shav, Netanel Zalevsky and Micha Bitton.

Since 2023, Bar-Yosef has participated in spoken-word performances organised by the Poetry Slam movement in Israel. She has also appeared at literary festivals including the Metula Poetry Festival, Poetry in the Desert Festival in Sde Boker, the Nissan Maghar Festival and the Guadalajara International Book Fair in Mexico.

In addition to poetry, she published two collections of short stories, ''Music'' (2012), which received the ASY Prize and was translated into Russian (2015), English (2016), and French (2019), and ''I Found Him on the Internet'' (2021; 2022 edition), which was translated into Russian (2024), English (2024), and Ukrainian (2025).

She also published the historical novel ''The Wealthy'' (2018), which received the Goldberg Prize and was translated into English in 2022, as well as a children's book (1984). A Monodrama based on one of the stories from the children's book was broadcast in 2011. In addition, she published an autobiographical book in the form of an interview (2016) and an autobiographical work about the life and death of her son (2026).

== Awards & honors for poetry ==
- ACUM Prize (1987)
- Tel Aviv Foundation Prize (1987)
- Jerusalem Foundation Prize for Poetry (1990)
- WIZO Prize for the Creative Woman (1999)
- President's Prize for Literature (2002)
- Brenner Prize (2005)
- Yehuda Amichai Prize (2011)
- Ramat Gan Municipality Prize (2012)
- ACUM Lifetime Achievement Prize (2013)
- Prize for Creative Writers and Poets (2017)
- Prime Minister's Prize for Literature (2017)
- Zelda Prize for Poetry (2024)

== Selected works ==
=== Poetry ===
- If Not in a Hurry (1971)
- Taking Air (1978)
- Only the Green (1981)
- Jumping Jacks (1984)
- In the Crush (1990)
- The No (1998)
- Night, Morning (2000)
- Food (2002)
- Recovery (2004)
- Selected and New Poems (2010)
- 15 Epitaphs, 13 Woodcuts (2010)
- Portraits (2012)
- A Whistle (2014)
- Motar (2015)
- Without Many Words (2018)
- The Miraculous Mistake (2020)
- The Wonderful Error (2020), Hakibbutz Hameuchad Publishing
- The Hard and the Ripe (2023), Hakibbutz Hameuchad Publishing
- Poems 2020–2023 (2023)
- Epitaphs (2025)
- Tohelet (2026)

=== Fiction ===
- Music (2012)
- The Wealthy (2018)
- I Found Him on the Internet (2021)

== See also ==
- Hebrew literature
- Israeli literature
- List of Israeli poets
