= Mois Benarroch =

Moroccan-Israeli poet and translator

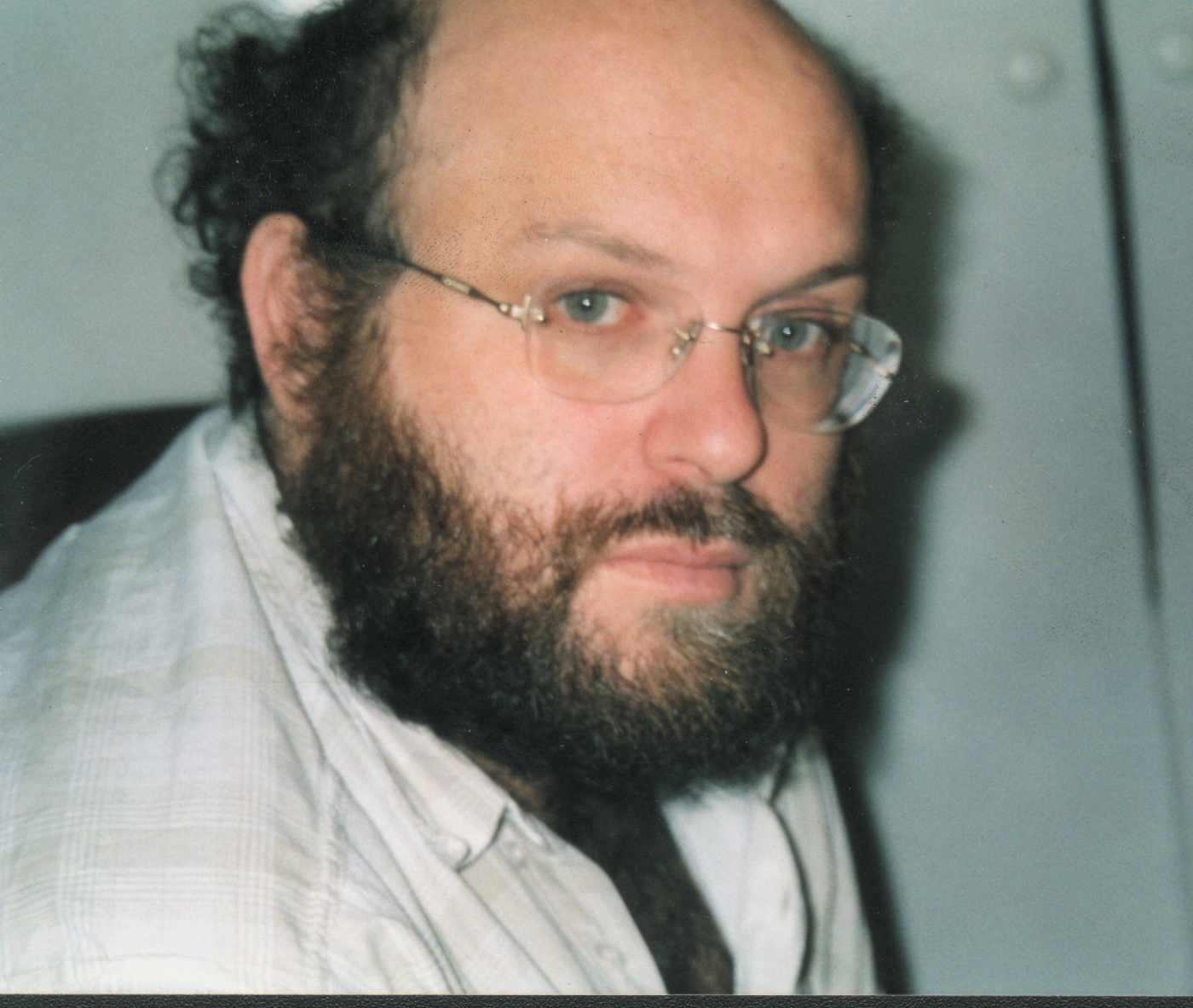
Mois Benarroch

Mois Benarroch (Hebrew: מואיז בן הראש; born 12 October 1959) is a Moroccan-Israeli poet and translator. Born in Tétouan, he moved to Tel Aviv, Israel in September 1972 at the age of thirteen with his family. Raised speaking Spanish in Morocco, he began writing poetry in English. He began translating his poetry from English to Hebrew before beginning to write poetry in Hebrew directly.

Benarroch has published over 25 novels and was awarded the Jacqueline Kahanoff Prize for fiction and The Yehuda Amichai Prize in 2012.
