= Rachel Tzvia Back =

Israeli poet

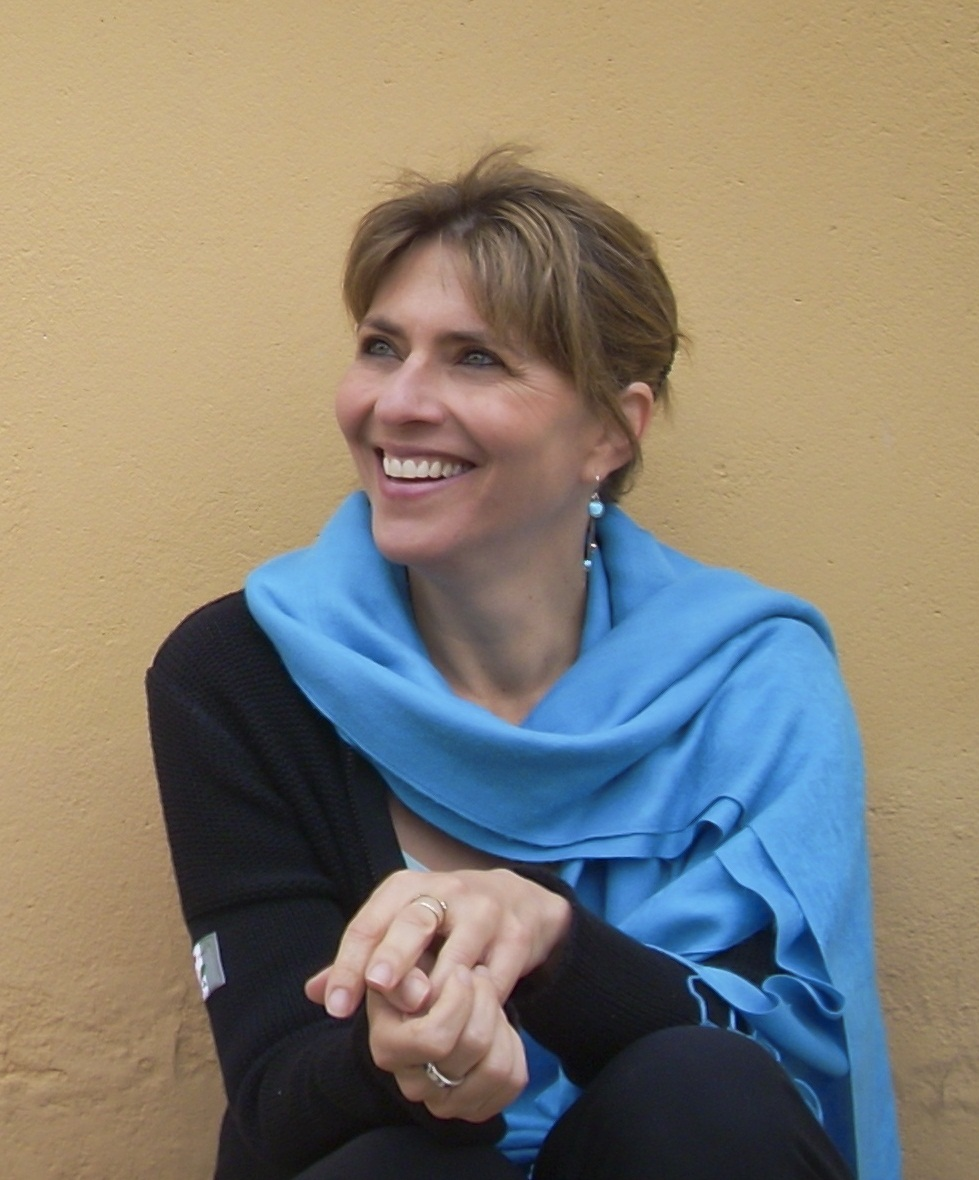
- Rachel Tzvia Back
- Born: Buffalo, New York, U.S.

Academic background
- Education: Yale University; Temple University; Hebrew University of Jerusalem (PhD)

Academic work
- Discipline: English literature
- Institutions: Oranim Academic College

Rachel Tzvia Back (Hebrew: רחל צביה בק) is an English-language Israeli poet, translator and professor of literature.

== Biography ==
Born in Buffalo, New York, Rachel Tzvia Back was raised in the U.S. and Israel. The seventh generation of her family in Israel, she returned to the country in 1980. She has lived in the Galilee, in the north of the country, since 2000. Back studied at Yale University, Temple University, and received her PhD from the Hebrew University of Jerusalem. She is a professor of English literature and head of the graduate English track at Oranim Academic College.

From 1995 to 2000, Back was the Israeli Academic and Administrative Director of the Wesleyan and Brown Universities Overseas Program in Israeli and Palestinian Studies, based in Jerusalem.

== Literary career ==
Back's most recent book publication is her memoir The Dark-Robed Mother (Wesleyan University Press 2026), an unflinching account of her decades-long journey through depression, loss, and motherhood. With poetic beauty and emotional intelligence, the memoir highlights the particular struggles of living with cyclical “high-functioning” depression, and its profound impact on self and family.

A noted and award-winning translator of Hebrew verse, Back's most recent translation publication is the bilingual anthology This Longing City: Modern Hebrew Poems of Jerusalem (Hebrew Union College Press). This singular collection, including 77 poems penned by 41 different Hebrew poets over 100 years, is the first such anthology of Hebrew Jerusalem poems to appear in English. Back was also the first to bring the work of Hebrew poet Tuvia Ruebner into English, in her two collections In the Illuminated Dark: Selected Poems of Tuvia Ruebner (winner of the 2016 TLS-Risa Domb/Porjes Award) and Now at the Threshold: the Late Poems of Tuvia Ruebner (2020).

Back's translations of preeminent Hebrew poet Lea Goldberg in Lea Goldberg: Selected Poetry and Drama were awarded a PEN Translation Grant, and the collection On the Surface of Silence: The Last Poems of Lea Goldberg, was shortlisted for the TLS-Risa Domb/Porjes Award in 2019. Back was also the editor and primary translator of the English edition of the groundbreaking anthology With an Iron Pen: Twenty Years of Hebrew Protest Poetry, Night, Morning: Selected Poems of Hamutal Bar Yosef and work collected in The Defiant Muse: Hebrew Feminist Poetry from Antiquity to the Present (The Feminist Press, 1999) and Hebrew Writers on Writing (Trinity University Press, 2008).

In 2015, Back was a finalist for the National Literary Translation Award in Poetry and the National Jewish Book Award in Poetry for the collection In the Illuminated Dark: Selected Poems of Tuvia Ruebner. That same year, Back delivered the Stronach Lecture at the University of Berkeley California, an address titled: "'This Bequest of Wings': On Teaching Poetry in a Region of Conflict."

In 2002, Back's critical monograph Led by Language: the Poetry and Poetics of Susan Howe, was published by University of Alabama Press.

== Grants & awards ==
- 2019 TLS-Risa Domb/Porjes Prize Shortlist (for On the Surface of Silence)
- 2016 TLS-Risa Domb/Porjes Prize Winner (for In the Illuminated Dark)
- 2015 National Translation Award Finalist
- 2015 National Jewish Book Award Finalist
- 2012 Dora Maar Fellowship of Brown Foundation Fellows Program
- 2012 Translation Grant from the Rabinovich Foundation
- 2008 Fundación Valparaíso Writer's Residence Award
- 2006 Scholar's Travel Grant from the Ford Foundation
- 2006 Research Grant from the Sherman Institute
- 2005 Hadassah-Brandeis Institute Research Award
- 2005 PEN Translation Grant
- 2005 Blue Mountain Artists Residence Fellowship
- 2000 Allan Bronfman Prize for Academic Excellence, Hebrew U.
- 1996 Absorption Minister's Prize for Immigrant Writers

== Works ==
Poetry

- What Use is Poetry, the Poet is Asking (Shearsman Books, 2019)
- A Messenger Comes (Singing Horse Press, 2012)
- On Ruins & Return: Poems 1999-2005 (Shearsman Books, 2005)
- Azimuth (Sheep Meadow Press, 2001)
- Chapbooks: The Buffalo Poems (Duration Press, 2003) & Litany (Meow Press, 1995)

Translations

- Now at the Threshold: The Late Poems of Tuvia Ruebner (HUC Press, 2020)
- On the Surface of Silence: The Last Poems of Lea Goldberg (HUC Press, 2018)
- In the Illuminated Dark: Selected Poems of Tuvia Ruebner (HUC Press, 2014)
- With an Iron Pen: Twenty Years of Hebrew Protest Poetry (SUNY Press, Excelsior Editions, 2009)
- Night, Morning: Poems by Hamutal Bar Yosef (Sheep Meadow Press, 2008)
- Lea Goldberg: Selected Poems & Drama (Toby Press, 2005)

Critical work

- Led by Language: the Poetry and Poetics of Susan Howe (University of Alabama Press, 2002)
