= Arsen Revazov =

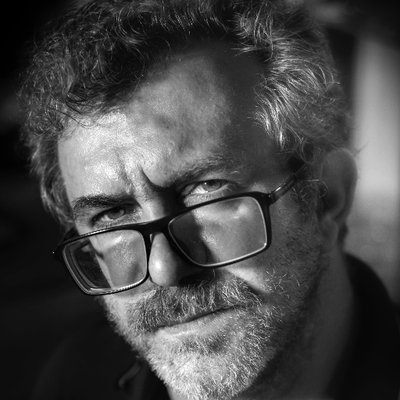
- Born: Arsen Anatolyevich Revazov; December 12, 1966 (age 59); Moscow, USSR
- Occupations: Author, entrepreneur, art-photographer
- Writing career
- Genres: Thriller, adventure, mystery, conspiracy

Arsen Revazov (Russian: Арсен Анатольевич Ревазов; born December 12, 1966) is an Israeli author, entrepreneur, and art-photographer.

== Early life and entrepreneurship ==
Arsen Revazov was born in Moscow, USSR, on December 12, 1966. He subsequently emigrated to Israel, where he lived for several years before returning to Moscow. In 1990, he graduated from the Moscow State University of Medicine and Dentistry, and since 1991 he has worked in the advertising and high-tech industries. Since 2002, he has served as president and chairman of the board of directors of online advertising agency IMHO Vi. In 2019 founded Oken Technologies, a neuroscience startup focused on detecting humans' cognitive state with eye tracking data. In 2020-21 as part of Oken Technologies' team Revazov published an article on the subject and filed patent application on corresponding machine learning technology.

== Literary career ==
Revazov's literary career began in 1992, when he published a collection of poems in Jerusalem, Israel. Between 1992 and 1995, he published a series of Russian-language short stories in Israel. Revazov is also an occasional writer of short stories for Russian periodicals. In 2005, Revazov’s debut novel, Loneliness-12 (Odinochestvo-12), was published by Moscow-based Ad Marginem Press. The author dubbed it a “fusion thriller”—a blend of conspiracy thriller, mystery, adventure, travelogue, and postmodernist literary elements.

In Loneliness-12, Joseph Mezenin, the hapless owner of a failing Moscow PR agency, teams up with his two best friends—a hot-headed go-getter, Matty Krasnov, and a mathematician turned high-tech consultant, Anton Epstein—to investigate the murder of a fourth friend, the Chemist, found decapitated in his own apartment, head missing. Not long after the murder, Joseph receives an advertising contract from an anonymous new client, FF, who pledges big money for each media placement of the words Deir el-Bahari, Calypsol, loneliness, and the number 222461215 but demands absolute nondisclosure. Unable to keep this momentous secret, Joseph reveals it to his friends and to his already-married girlfriend, Maria Zephori, precipitating further deaths, mysteries, and high-stakes encounters that take the group through Israel, Italy, Japan, and throughout Russia in search of the Chemist's murderers. As the friends unravel FF's keywords, they find themselves battling an international cult of the woman-pharaoh Hatshepsut to defeat which they must brave government bureaucracies, psychedelic rituals, historical puzzles, daring escapes, existential mysteries, love triangles, and the prospect of eternal loneliness.

Loneliness-12 became a bestseller in Russia and attracted praise and mentions from critics, journalists, bloggers, and publications—including The Moscow Times, Newsweek Russia, The Russian Gazette, Gazeta.ru, MK Boulevard, Vedomosti, Novaya Gazeta, Kommersant Business Gazette, Cosmopolitan, Glamour, Afisha, and others.

The politician and journalist Valeriya Novodvorskaya described Loneliness-12 as a "saga written in very good Russian prose masterfully laced with slang—a tale of four modern-day musketeers who venture through fire, water, and brass pipes, through perestroika, privatization, and wild capitalism, through jails and privations, through monastic cells and mystical afterworlds, through the Vatican, the Land of Israel, and the mansion of a mafia kingpin." Russian critic Lev Danilkin described it as "'Murakami plus'—plus Foucault's Pendulum, plus The Da Vinci Code, plus The Club Dumas, plus Naïve. Super., plus By the River Piedra I Sat Down and Wept. Plus Seven Years In Tibet, plus Fear and Loathing in Las Vegas, plus In the Mood for Love, plus The Bourne Identity, plus The Ninth Gate." Between 2006 and 2013, Loneliness-12 was translated into several languages—including Italian, Polish, Hungarian, Czech, and German—and published internationally under various titles.^{[⇨]}

In 2020, the novel, heavily rewritten, was re-released by Corpus. The book received positive reviews from critics.

At the moment, the writer is working on his next book - the novel "Loneliness-13. Metaferons". An experimental video book format was chosen for it: the author himself reads the text of the chapters on the camera, and the episodes are published on the You-tube channel, Yandex.Dzene and in online cinemas. The book premiered at the non / fiction 2021 exhibition.

In the future, it is planned to release the novel "Loneliness-13. Metaferons" in a traditional print edition.

Revazov is the founder and editor-in-chief of SilentRoom Journal, an online publication about writing and artificial intelligence.

== Art photography ==
Revazov is an art-photographer. He began experimenting with photography as early as the third grade of elementary school. Today, he specializes in large-format analog photography and uses infrared film and platinum printing techniques. His artistic vision focuses on the exploration of an unseen, invisible world that can be visualized in four-dimensional space, on black-and-white infrared film. Exhibitions of Revazov's works have been displayed by various art galleries and other venues in a number of countries, such as in Russia, Italy, and the UK.^{[⇨]}

== Musical career ==
Arsen Revazov is a leader of the Yauza musical group. It's post-rock music is a fusion of styles: from rock romance and Balkan jazz to blues art rock and rock ballads. In some compositions, musicians use allusions, reminiscences and references to classical music: Brahms, Albinoni, etc. The team was created in the fall of 2019. The group got its name in honor of the Yauza River, where Arsen spent his childhood, as well as in honor of the eponymous Soviet tape recorder.

The musicians began active creative and concert activity in the summer of 2020, the group managed to give a number of concerts in Moscow, perform at several city festivals and on television and radio.

On November 27, the group's first album, entitled "Butterflies and Tanks", was released. All the songs on the album were written by Arsen Revazov on the verses of the famous Leningrad-Jerusalem poet Mikhail Gendelev.

At the moment "Yauza" is working on the second album on the verses of Osip Mandelstam, from which two singles with music videos have already been released.

== Miscellaneous ==
Revazov is credited with the idea of the "white ribbon", which became a symbol of dissent during the 2011–13 Russian protests, against the results of the 2011 Russian legislative election.

== Bibliography ==
=== Novels in Russian ===
- Revazov, Arsen. Odinochestvo-12: Roman-fusion. Moscow: Ad Marginem, 2005. Original edition. ISBN 5-93321-109-5
- Revazov, Arsen. Odinochestvo-12: Roman-fusion. Moscow: Ad Marginem, 2006. Reprint. ISBN 5-91103-015-2
- Revazov, Arsen. Odinochestvo-12. Moscow: Ad Marginem, 2008. Reprint. ISBN 978-5-91103-021-6

=== Translations ===
- Revazov, Arsen. Solitudine 12. Translated into Italian by Nadia Cicognini and Cristina Moroni. Casale Monferrato (AL): Piemme, 2008. ISBN 88-384-7640-3
- Revazov, Arsen. Samotność 12: Powieść-fusion. Translated into Polish by Marek Jerzowski. Kraków: Wydawnictwo Literackie, 2008. ISBN 978-83-08-03991-5
- Revazov, Arsen. Magány-12. Translated into Hungarian by Balázsi József Attila. Budapest: Gabo, 2007. ISBN 978-963-689-057-5
- Revazov, Arsen. Osamocení 12: Román-fusion. Translated into Czech by Ondřej Mrázek. Praha: Argo, 2009. ISBN 978-80-257-0091-4
- Revazov, Arsen. Der Schwarze Gral: Thriller. Translated into German by Anna Serafin. München: Blanvalet, 2009. ISBN 978-3-442-36568-5
- Revazov, Arsen. Der Schwarze Gral: Roman. Translated into German by Anna Serafin. München: Blanvalet, 2007. ISBN 978-3-442-37316-1

== Photography exhibitions ==
- Invisible Light. Tretyakov Gallery. Moscow, Russia. December 2019–January 2020.
- Red/Slash/Beautiful. ar33studio. Venice, Italy. May–September 2017.
- Antarctic Loneliness. Mia Art Fair. Milan, Italy. May 2017.
- Art Venice 2016, International Exhibition of Contemporary Art. San Servolo, Venice, Italy. October 2016.
- Italy From the Fourth Dimension. Saatchi Gallery. London, United Kingdom. September 2016.
- From a Window of Venice. ar33studio. Venice, Italy. August 2016.
- Shaping the Light. With José Manuel Alorda. Palumbo Fossati Palace. Venice, Italy. May 2016.
- 4D. ar33studio. Venice, Italy. February 2016.
- In Memory of Boris Christoff. CALL'ART 2016: International Exhibition of Contemporary Art. Spazio Badoer. Venice, Italy. February 2016.
- 4D. Triumph Gallery. 6th Moscow International Biennale of Contemporary Art. Moscow, Russia. October–November 2015.
- Italy From the Fourth Dimension. ar33studio. Venice, Italy. October–November 2015.
- Because the World Is Round. Gallery of Classical Photography. Moscow, Russia. October–November 2012.
- One by Two. Triumph Gallery. Moscow, Russia. June–July 2012.
- Unrumpled Sheets of Venice. 4th Moscow International Biennale of Contemporary Art. Art-House Gallery. Moscow, Russia. 2011.
- Non-Apparent World. Winzavod Contemporary Art Center, Meglinskaya Gallery. Moscow, Russia. July–August 2010.
- Non-Apparent World. PhotoCenter Exhibition Hall. Moscow, Russia. 2010.
- Non-Apparent World. 2010 Moscow Photo Biennale. Triumph Gallery. Moscow, Russia. 2010.
