= Galit Hasan-Rokem =

Professor of folklore

Professor Galit Hasan-Rokem
- גלית חזן־רוקם
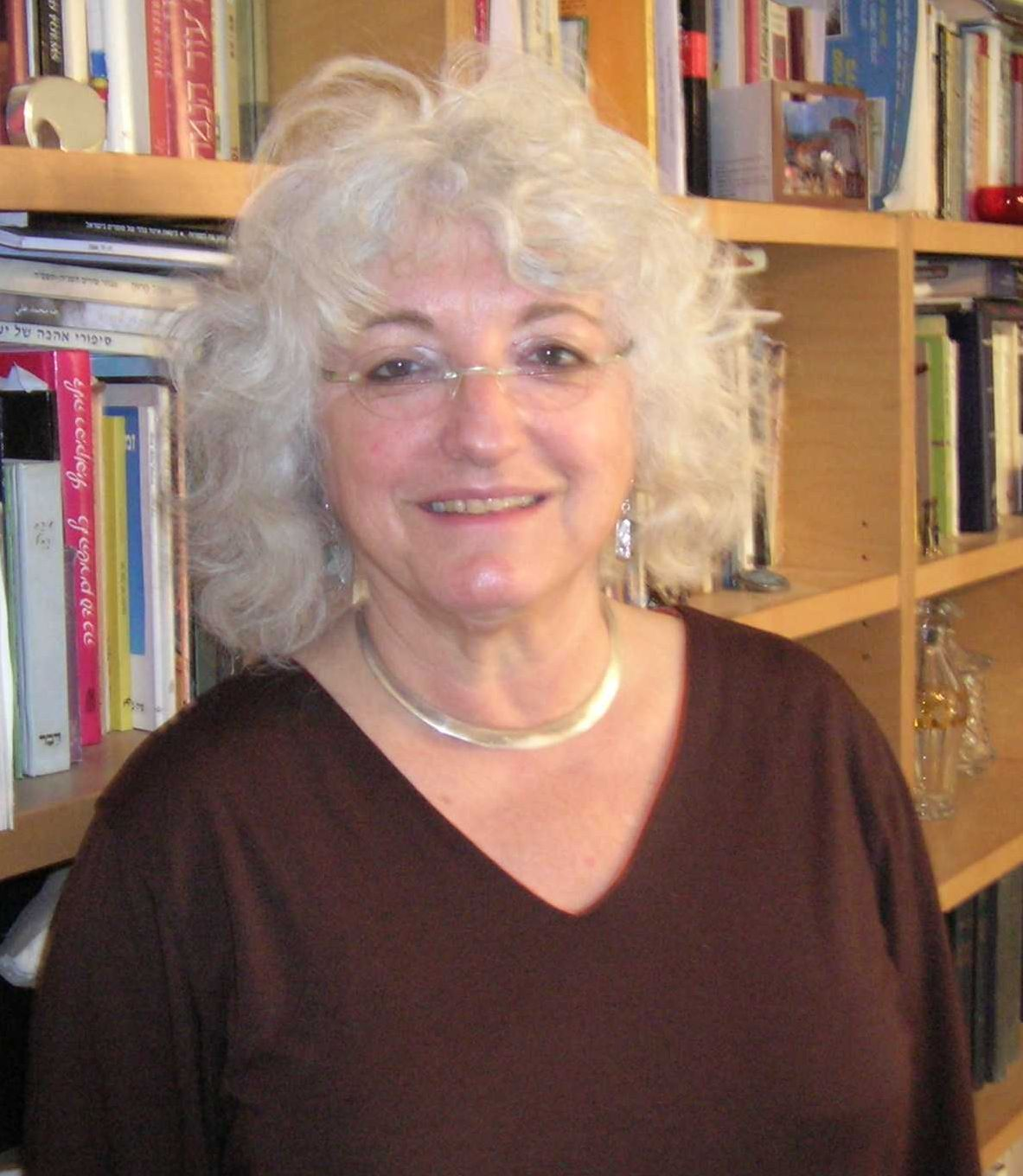
- Galit Hasan-Rokem in 2008
- Born: 29 August 1945 (age 81); Helsinki, Finland
- Education: Hebrew University of Jerusalem (PhD)
- Employer: Hebrew University of Jerusalem
- Known for: Paremiology, folklore in Israel
- Spouse: Freddie Rokem
- Children: 3

Galit Hasan-Rokem (Hebrew: גלית חזן־רוקם; born 29 August 1945) is the Max and Margarethe Grunwald professor of folklore at the Mandel Institute of Jewish Studies at the Hebrew University of Jerusalem. Author and editor of numerous works, including co-editor of the Wiley-Blackwell Companion to Folklore (2012), her research interests include proverbs, folklore and culture of the Middle East, and folklore genres and narratives. She is also a published poet and translator of poetry, and a Pro-Palestinian activist. The Jerusalem Post has called her "a figure of some prominence in Jerusalem intellectual circles".

== Early life and education ==
Galit Hasan-Rokem was born in 1945 in Helsinki to Jewish parents who were also natives of Finland. She attended the Helsinki Jewish day school from 1952 to 1957. In 1957, at the age of 12, she immigrated with her family to Israel.

Following high school graduation, she completed her compulsory military service and enrolled in the Hebrew University of Jerusalem in the late 1960s. After attaining her undergraduate degree, she participated in an exchange program at the University of Helsinki's Department of Finnish and Comparative Folklore, where she studied under Professors Matti Kuusi and Lauri Honko, solidifying her desire to become a folklorist. She earned her doctorate at the Hebrew University of Jerusalem in 1978, studying under Professor Dov Noy. She became a full professor of folklore at the Hebrew University of Jerusalem in 1984.

== Work ==
Hasan-Rokem's research interests include proverbs, folklore and culture of the Middle East, and folklore genres and narratives, including folklore in rabbinic literature. She has produced several major works studying proverbs in Israel and the proverbs of Georgian Jews in Israel.

Hasan-Rokem displays a "conscious feminism" in her work. Her interdisciplinary approach to folklore, including the feminist aspects of her research, are frequently quoted by other authors. Books and other works by Hasan-Rokem have been published in more than eight languages.

== Other activities ==
Hasan-Rokem founded the Proverb Indexing Project at the Hebrew University of Jerusalem Folklore Research Center. She assisted her mentor, Professor Noy, in developing the Hebrew University's Folklore Program into a full undergraduate, graduate, and doctoral degree program. She co-founded the annual Israeli Inter-University Folklore Conference in 1981. She is also credited with elevating the recognition of Israeli folklore studies to the international level. She has lectured as a visiting professor at Ben-Gurion University of the Negev, the University of California at Berkeley, the University of Pennsylvania, and the University of Chicago, and engages in teaching and research cooperation with scholars in the United States, Germany, Scandinavia, and the Palestinian Authority.

She was the associate editor of Proverbium, the yearbook of international proverb scholarship from 1984 until 2021. She is a regular contributor to the Encyclopedia of Fairy Tales, published by the Göttingen Academy of Sciences and Humanities.

From 2001 to 2004 she headed the Mandel Institute of Jewish Studies at the Hebrew University of Jerusalem.

== Poet ==
ARS POETICA (Note: The word "ars", which means "art" in Latin, phonetically translates as "pimp" in Hebrew and Arabic slang.)
Men poets have muses
Wrapping them in soft affection
Calling them with gentle voices, Fondling
And I have you, poetical pimp
Sending me to the street corner
Dressed in light, cheap clothes
Tyrannizing me, selling me
Upon my return, stealing my wages
Hitting me so that I'll know
Driving my heart mad
Making a laughingstock of me
Sometimes offering me the grace of a moment
No man will get this from me.

— Galit Hasan-Rokem

Hasan-Rokem is a published poet and translator of poetry. She has produced three volumes of poetry in Hebrew, some of which has appeared in translation. She translated a selection of Swedish-language poems by Finnish poet Edith Södergran (1892–1923) into Hebrew for her second book of poetry, Voice Training: Poems (1998). In 2013 she translated the complete poems of Swedish poet Tomas Tranströmer into Hebrew.

== Pro-Palestinian activist ==
Hasan-Rokem is a founding editor of the Palestine–Israel Journal and a long-time pro-Palestinian activist. She is a strong supporter of the two-state solution and the division of Jerusalem into the capital of both Israel and a Palestinian state. As a visiting scholar at Rutgers University in 2014, she claimed that Israeli street signs exhibit bias against Arabic-speaking residents, since the Hebrew text is more prominent and the Arabic translation is often a phonetic version of the Hebrew.

== Memberships ==
Hasan-Rokem served as president of the International Society for Folk Narrative Research from 1998 to 2005. She is a member of the Folklore Fellows international executive committee and advisory board since 1993, and a member of the King Gustav Adolf Academy for Folk Culture in Sweden since 2007. She has been awarded two fellowships from the Herbert D. Katz Center for Advanced Judaic Studies at the University of Pennsylvania, in 2003–2004 and 2015–2016. Hasan-Rokem was Fellow at the Wissenschaftskolleg https://www.wiko-berlin.de/en/zu Berlin in 2004–5.

== Personal ==
Hasan-Rokem is married to Freddie Rokem, the Emanuel Herzikowitz Professor for 19th- and 20th-Century Art at Tel Aviv University and a published author in theatre studies. They have three children. Their son, Amitai, died in a hiking accident in 1990.

She is fluent in Finnish, Hebrew, Swedish, and English.

== Selected bibliography ==
- Sirens in the Rabbinic Academy: Poetics, Folklore and Hermeneutics in Leviticus Rabbah (in Hebrew). The Bialik Institute. 2023.
- A Companion to Folklore. John Wiley & Sons. 2012. ISBN 978-1405194990. (co-edited with Regina Bendix)
- Tales of the Neighborhood: Jewish Narrative Dialogues in Late Antiquity. University of California Press. 2003. ISBN 0520928946.
- Jewish Women in the Yishuv and Zionism: A Gender Perspective (in Hebrew). 2001. English revised edition: Jewish Women in Pre-State Israel: Life History, Politics, and Culture, Brandeis University Press, 2008 (co-edited with Margalit Shilo and Ruth Kark)
- Web of Life: Folklore and Midrash in Rabbinic Literature. Stanford University Press. 2000. ISBN 0804732272.
- The Defiant Muse: Hebrew Feminist Poems from Antiquity to the Present: A Bilingual Anthology. Feminist Press at CUNY. 1999. ISBN 1558612246. (co-edited with Shirley Kaufman and Tamar Hess)
- The Palestinian Aggadic Midrash Eikha Rabba (in Hebrew). 1996.
- Untying the Knot: On Riddles and Other Enigmatic Modes. Oxford University Press. 1996. ISBN 0195108566. (with David Dean Shulman)
- Adam le-Adam Gesher: Proverbs of Georgian Jews in Israel (in Hebrew). Machon Ben-Zvi. 1993. ISBN 9789652350473.
- The Wandering Jew: Essays in the Interpretation of a Christian Legend. Indiana University Press. 1986. ISBN 978-0-253-36340-4. (co-edited with Alan Dundes)
- Proverbs in Israeli Folk Narratives: A structural semantic analysis. Suomalainen Tiedeakatemia. 1982. ISBN 9789514104268.

=== Poetry ===
- Tsippori: Forty-Minus-One Byzantine Haiku from the Galilee and a Poem (in Hebrew). Am Oved. 2002.
- Voice Training: Poems (in Hebrew). Hakibbutz Hameuchad. 1998.
- Like Lot's Wife (in Hebrew). 1989.
