= Hagit Grossman =

Israeli poet and novelist

- חגית גרוסמן
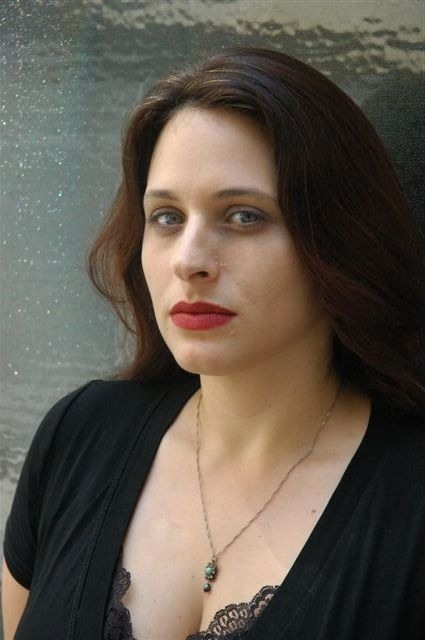
- Born: September 26, 1976 (age 49); Rishon LeZion, Israel
- Occupation: Poet
- Spouse: Yehonatan Dayan
- Children: 2

Hagit Grossman (Hebrew: חגית גרוסמן; born on September 26, 1976, in Rishon LeZion, Israel) is an Israeli poet and novelist.

== Early life and education ==
Her first poem was published at the age of six in a school newspaper. When she was ten, her parents separated and her father raised her and her two sisters on his own. When she was fourteen, one of her poems was published in an anthology.

Grossman went to the Ness Ziona high school, studied photography at "Camera Obscura", theater at "Beit Zvi", painting at "Hamidrasha" Art College, and Hebrew and General Literature at Tel Aviv University. In 2006, she studied for a master's degree in Literary and Creative Writing at the Department of Hebrew Literature of the Ben-Gurion University of the Negev.

== Literary career ==
Grossman teaches writing at "Musrara", a multidisciplinary art school in Jerusalem.

Grossman is one of the most prominent of the young generation's poets, her work has been published in various literary journals.

As of 2018, she had published six poetry books, four novels, and a collection of short stories.

=== Poetry ===
Her first book of poems is a kind of lament to her father, a sensitive journey with a description of the relationship and longing for him:

Let the light undress the shadow's secret from your thin arms.
Your blue eyes freezes by the flight of the great light
And I sit and stare into the dark, my neck wrapped
around your shadowed scarves.

("Let the Light" from Nine poems for Samuel)

In her second book of poems there are lamentations to her lover who committed suicide alongside Love poems to her current lover, and poems of childhood memories, relationships and anxiety:

At night, I saw you through a veil of darkness
And I dreamt I had a smile.
A warm sound passed through my body
And your love does not subside.

("Through a Veil" from Ash Whales)

Her poetry was published in France by "Levant", and in the UK by Shearsman Books.

Her poem "On Friendship", published in The New Yorker, participates in research at a hospital that examines the impact of writing and reading poetry on cancer patients.

=== Novels ===
In her first novel, Where they are Not, she manages to tread the fine boundaries between poetry and prose, and best describes a world where the occult and the visible are mutually intertwined. Her poems deal with the tension between foreignness and love, between death, absence and longing for the past and finding ways to revive it through poetry. At times it seems abstract and ambiguous, but its linguistic sensitivity and penetrating gaze create an expressive and rich expression that indicates virtuosic talent, without inhibition or formal restraint. Her poetry, wrote Erez Schweitzer (2010), is an event of passion and holiness, of vitality and of death, of danger but also of refuge.

== Published books ==
Poetry

- Nine poems for Samuel (Plonit Publishing House, 2007)
- Ash Whales (Keshev Leshira, 2010)
- Trembling of the City (Keshev Leshira, 2013)
- The Book of the Body (Hakibutz Hameuhad, 2017),
- The lovers (tarsat,2023).
- The origin of hunger (Hakibutz Hameuhad, 2024).

Novels

- Where they are not (Yedioth Books, 2012)
- Laila and Lewis (Kineret Zmora Bitan, 2014).
- רוחות פרצים ('Drafts'; Kineret Zmora Bitan, 2018)

Alone in a hotel room(navadim, 2026)

Collection of short stories

- To Revive Silent Things (Pardes Publishing, 2017)

== Private life ==
Grossman lives in Tel Aviv. She is married to Yehonatan Dayan, a literature scholar, editor and translator. The couple has two daughters.
