= Boaz Zippor =

Israeli artist and poet

- בועז ציפור
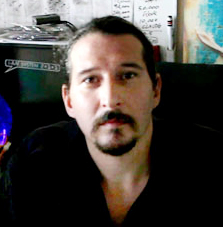
- Boaz Zippor, 2011
- Born: 1972 (age 53–54); Tel Aviv, Israel
- Education: Industrial Design and Visual Communications
- Alma mater: Istituto Europeo di Design
- Known for: artist, poet and musician
- Website: www.boazzippor.net

Boaz Zippor (Hebrew: בועז ציפור; born 1972) is an Israeli artist, photographer, poet, and author, based in Thailand. He is the author of three books on poetry. His artwork has been exhibited in Thailand, Hong Kong, China, United States, Israel, Spain, and Italy. He is a native of Tel-Aviv, Israel.

== Professional background ==
Boaz Zippor was educated at Istituto Europeo di Design in Milan, Italy, where he majored in Industrial Design and Visual Communications, earning a degree in 1997.

Following his graduation, he founded two multimedia and design companies, entitled Anything.it in Italy and KOTO-FOIRD in Israel.

He eventually developed his own career as an artist, photographer, and poet, which began with several exhibitions of mixed media and large-scale prints, debuting in a 2001 exhibition at Via Malaga Art Center in Milan.

Zippor moved to Bangkok, Thailand in 2003, where he initially worked as art director and creative director for AMA Design, HYM Design, and California Wow Experience. As of 2011, Zippor has held 14 exhibitions of mixed media, multimedia projections, and photography, which garnered media attention.

=== Music Projects ===
In 2013 Zippor changed his creative focus to music, founding an experimental music production company and self releasing albums through his label. As of September 2019, he has released 24 albums and jam session recordings with a variety of musicians, including percussionist Didier Mpondo and guitarist Clark Berger. He has explained that his music comes from the same creative drive as his poetry, a healthy way to let out his emotions and keep them from bottling up, and that he turned to making music for himself out of a dissatisfaction with the music around him.

He has also explained that he views himself as an iconoclast, that he is happy performing for cheesecake when he is not on a diet, and will consider performing live as long has he does not come on after Carlos Santana.

== Philanthropy ==
Zippor began his involvement in charity work with various organizations, including Latet in Israel. He has supported several projects in Thailand, including Camillian Hospital, Rotary Club Bangkok South, Baan Unrak, Baan Prakart, Newsmakers Clutter Sale, and Bangkok Opera Education Fund, most of which are projects in the field of education for underprivileged children.

== Published works ==
- Anthology, (three volumes), Boaz Zippor Creative Co. ltd., October 18, 2011 ISBN 978-1-257-76749-6
- Waiting, Boaz Zippor Creative Co. Ltd., September 30, 2011 ISBN 978-1-257-56077-6
- Visual Poetry, (two volumes), Boaz Zippor Creative Co. Ltd (Standard Copyright License), March 31, 2010.
