= Mordechai Geldman =

Israeli writer, artist, and psychologist (1946–2021)

- מרדכי גלדמן
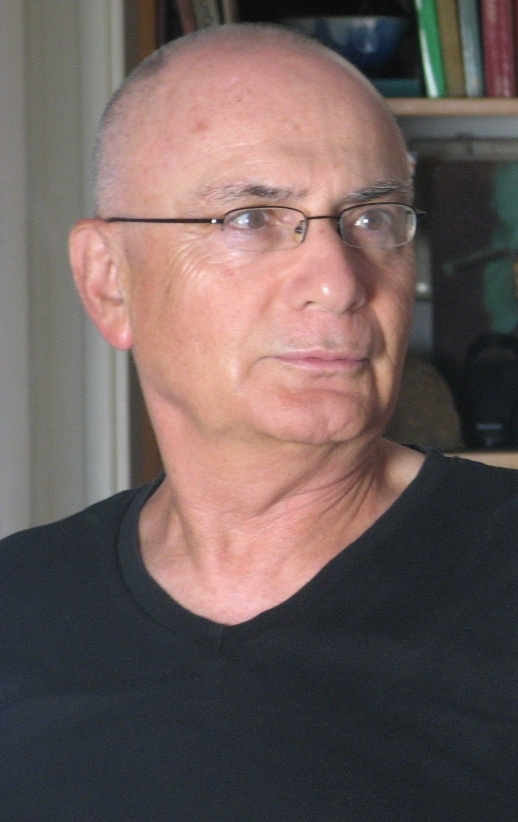
- Born: 16 April 1946; Munich, Germany
- Died: 8 October 2021 (aged 75); Tel Aviv, Israel
- Occupations: Poet; Art critic; Essayist; Photographer; Psychologist
- Writing career
- Pen name: Daniel Kasif (1 book)
- Notable awards: Brenner Prize; Bialik Prize

Mordechai Geldman (Hebrew: מרדכי גלדמן; 16 April 1946 – 8 October 2021) was an Israeli poet, non-fiction writer, artist, art critic and curator, and psychologist. His poems were translated into many languages, including the collection Years I Walked at Your Side published in 2018 by SUNY Press. He received awards including the Bialik Prize for his life achievements.

== Biography ==
Geldman was born at a displaced persons camp in Munich to Polish parents who had survived the Holocaust. His family immigrated to Israel in 1949 and settled in Tel Aviv, where he lived ever since. He studied world literature and clinical psychology at Bar Ilan University. He was an independent psychotherapist using psychoanalytical methods.

Geldman published 18 poetry books, a book of short stories, and six non-fiction books. A two-volume collection from his poetry books was published in 2011. His last poetry book is the third volume, of works written until 2019. His poems were translated into many languages, including Chinese and Japanese. His book Becoming One was translated into Portuguese (Teoria Do Um) and published in Portugal in 2017. A large collection of his poems in English was published in 2018 by SUNY Press of the State University of New York, titled Years I Walked at Your Side in translations by Tsipi Keller.

Geldman's poetry is philosophical, psychological and existentialistic. It combines literary Hebrew and everyday language, even using some slang. His later poetry tends to be meditative and includes many haiku, influenced by Zen Buddhist aesthetics and philosophy. His poetry has many aspects, including lyrical, philosophical, sensual, erotic, religious and ironic. He was gay, and was one of the first Israeli poets to write explicit homo-erotic poetry in the 1970s.

He was a representative of poetry from Israel at international events such as the Biennale of Poetry in Liège, Belgium, in 1995, the Israeli Cultural Season in France in 1998, the Second Tokyo Poetry Festival in 2011, and the poetry festival LiFFt in Baku, Azerbaijan, in 2019.

Geldman's non-fiction books deal with subjects as the self in psychoanalytic theories and in Yoga and Buddhism, psychoanalytic interpretation of literature, such as doubles, and symmetries in Shakespeare's plays, and his favorite Israeli poets and artists.

As a visual artist, Geldman was engaged in plastic arts, ceramics and photography. His photographs were exhibited at such places as the Tel Aviv Museum of Art. Geldman was an art critic of the Israeli daily Haaretz, and curated exhibitions for many Israeli artists.

Geldman died of cancer at age 75.

Zvika Nir, the chairman of the Writers' Association, summarised:

Mordechai Geldman was a poet with a unique and extraordinary voice. Brave, daring, who did not hesitate to reveal his life, loves and looks in his many years of poetry. His language of poetry was a work of thought of the various stages of the Hebrew language embedded in pearls of world poetry, especially European and Western poetry for the generations he knew well. As a psychologist and analyst, he has been engaged in new artistic endeavors all his life and in recent years has also devoted himself to the types of Japanese poetry. He was also a multidisciplinary artist, engaged in painting and drawing, photography and sculpture. In addition, he also wrote prose and especially books of thought and study in which he pointed out the system of connections between literature and psychoanalysis.

== Awards ==
- Chomsky Prize for Poetry (1983)
- Prime Minister's Prize for Hebrew Writers (1996)
- Brenner Prize for literature (1997)
- The Yehuda Amichai Prize (2004)
- Bialik Prize for his life achievements (2010)

== Publications ==
Geldman published works in many genres, including:

=== Poetry ===
- Sea Time, Land Time (1970)
- Bird (1975)
- Window (1980)
- Songs 1966-1983 (1983)
- Milano (1988)
- Eye (1993)
- Book of Ask (1997)
- Time (1997) with art by Moshe Gershuni
- Mourning Songs (2000) with art by Pesach Slabosky
- Oh My Dear Wall (2000)
- The Heart's Poem (2004)
- Tamir's Poems (2007), under the pseudonym Daniel Kasif
- Years I Walked at Your Side (2011), in 2 volumes. A wide collection from Geldman's poetry books and new poems.
- Becoming One (2013)
- Night Line (2015)
- Years I Walked at your Side (2019), 3rd volume. A collection from Geldman's poems written 2013–2019
- Crescent on a Boat (Haiku collection) (2019)
- Teoria Do Um (תורת הייחוד) (2016), in 2 volumes. Translated to Portuguese by Joao Paulo Esteves Da Silva. Portugal: Douda Correria
- Years I Walked at Your Side (2018), a collection from Geldman's poetry. Translated to English by Tsipi Keller. Excelsior Editions, State University New York Press
- Wine on Ice, English poems, Demer Press (Netherlands), 2021

=== Non-fiction ===
- Dark Mirror (1995)
- Psychoanalytic Criticism (1998)
- Eating Fire, Drinking Fire (2002)
- The True Self and the Self of Truth (2006)
- In the Silver Mirror: Bianca Eshel Gershuny (2007)
- Mirrors and Doubles: Shakespeare as a psychoanalyst (2019)

=== Catalogues ===
- Sharon Landscapes: Helen Berman (2009)
- Dad's Bird: Naomi Brickman (2012)
- The Source of Light: Einan Cohen (2015)

=== Prose ===
- Neighbours and Other Perverts (2014)
