= Edith Covensky =

American poet

- אדית קובנסקי
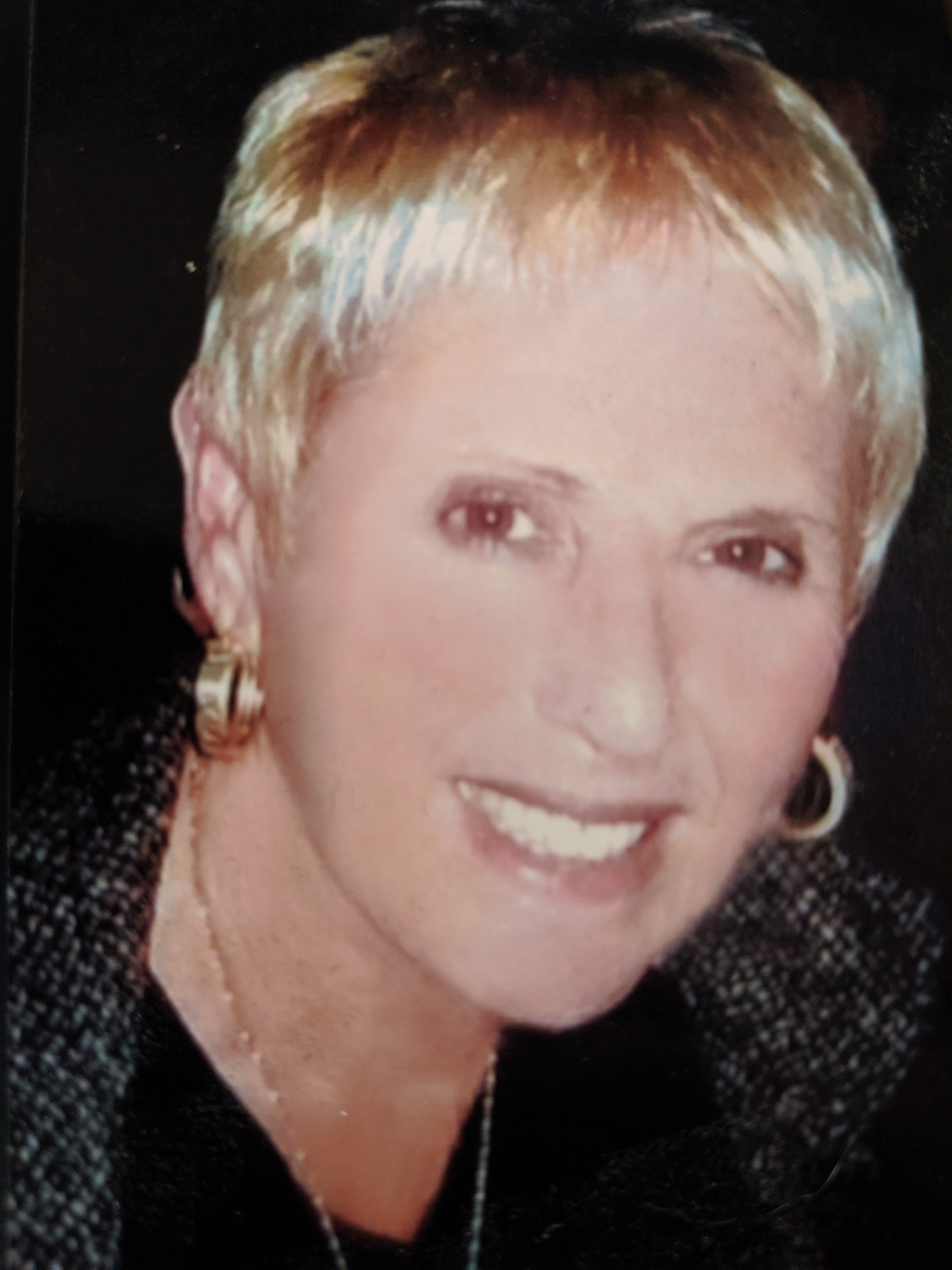
- Born: April 14, 1945 (age 81); Bucharest, Romania
- Education: Wayne State University

Edith Covensky (Hebrew: אדית קובנסקי; born April 14, 1945, Idit Ḳovensḳi in Romanian) is a Hebrew poet living in the United States and senior lecturer in Hebrew and Israeli Studies at Wayne State University. She has authored 34 books of poetry, in Hebrew, bilingually in Hebrew and English, trilingually in Hebrew, Arabic and English, and in Romanian and Spanish.

== Early life ==
Covensky was born in Bucharest, Romania, grew up in Haifa, Israel, and presently resides in Bloomfield Hills, Michigan. Growing up in Haifa, she went to "Maalot Ha'neveem" ("Steps of the Prophets") elementary school, and continued high school at Alliance Francaise Israelite (Kol Israel Haverim) where she focused on Hebrew and French literature. She served in the Israel Defense Forces (IDF, 1963-1965) as a code-breaker. Following her military discharge in 1965, she traveled to the United States.

== Professional career ==
Since 1987 Covensky has been teaching Hebrew and Israeli Studies at Wayne State University in Detroit, Michigan.

She is a member of the National Association of Professors of Hebrew, and of the Hebrew Writers Association in Israel; editor of Pseifas, an Israeli literary Journal dedicated to classical and Hebrew poetry; and a member of the Association of Alexander Dumas the Father, located in Paris, France.

Covensky started writing Hebrew poetry in 1981, publishing her first poem "Small Blessings" (Hebrew: "Al Hassadim Ktanim") in Bitzaron, a distinguished literary journal issued by New York University, in 1982. She has published to date 34 poetry books. Her numerous individual poems have been published in Israel, Canada, and in the United States.

French Professor Michael Giordano, prefaced her poetry in the volume In the Beginning (Hebrew: Breeah; French: Genese), Gvanim, Tel-Aviv, 2017. Jeffrey L. Covensky prefaced Life as Fiction (Gvanim, 2017.) A Hebrew version was published in Pseifas, 2017.

== Critical response ==
Covensky's poetry has been the subject of the volume Under a Silky Sky: The Symbolist Poetry of Edith Covensky, written by scholar and literary critic Yair Mazor. He described her work in a 1996 review as "lyrical poetry", praising it for its "esthetic dexterity" in "composition, theme, and metaphorical artistry". In a 2012 review he described her work as "metaphysical poetry". He likens it to the work of impressionist painters, which must be observed from the correct distance to be fully seen.

Edith Covensky's most praiseworthy volumes of poetry operate on two levels. The surface layer provides the most enchanting poetic experience, even prior to a comprehensive analysis of the poem. The latent layer, however, is available for the reader only after a systematic elucidating process of fastidious interpretation. Both layers introduce a work of poetry of the most worthy, rewarding nature. Yair Mazor, 2012.

== Works ==
The following books are published by Eked Publishers, Tel Aviv, Israel; the books are in bi-lingual editions: Hebrew-English unless otherwise specified, translated into English by Edouard and Susann Codish.

- Other Words (1985, Hebrew)
- Syncopations (1987, Hebrew)
- Night Poems (1992, Hebrew-English)
- An Anatomy of Love (1992, Hebrew-English)
- Partial Autobiography (1993, Hebrew-English)
- Origins (1994, Hebrew-English)
- Synesis (1995, Hebrew-English)
- Jerusalem Poems (1996, Hebrew-English)
- Poetics (1997, Hebrew-English)
- After Auschwitz (1998, Hebrew-English)
- Metamorphosis and Other Poems (1999, Hebrew-English)
- Steps (2000, Hebrew-English)
- Electrifying Love (2001, English-Romanian)
- Collage (2002, Hebrew-English)
- Zohar (2002, Hebrew-English)
- Anatomy of Love: Selected Poems 1992-2002 (2005, Hebrew-English)

The following books are published by Gvanim Publishers, Tel-Aviv, Israel; translated from the Hebrew into English by Edouard and Susann Codish unless otherwise specified.

- Variations on a Theme by Albert Camus (2006, Hebrew-English)
- Black Rain (2007, Hebrew-English)
- True Love (2007, Hebrew-English)
- Testimony (2008, Hebrew-English)
- In the Beninning (2009, Hebrew-English)
- Pentagram: Selected Poems from 2006-2008 (2010, Hebrew-English)
- Also Job was a Paradox (2010, Hebrew-English)
- Love Embraces Love (2011, tri-lingual edition: Hebrew-Arabic-English, translated into Arabic by Professor and acclaimed poet Naim Araidi)
- On the Existence of Love (2011, Hebrew-English)
- Allusion to Auschwitz (2011, Hebrew), edited by Professor Hanna Yaoz Kest. Van Gelder Center, Bar Ilan University, Ramat Gan, Israel.
- Matters of Sand (2012, Hebrew-English)
- On the Edge of Water (2012, Hebrew-English)
- Microcosm (2014, Hebrew)
- Life as Fiction (2017, Hebrew-English; translated into English by Edith Covensky)
- Genesis (2017, Hebrew-French; translated into French by Collette Salem; Spanish translation by Marta Teitelbaum and Luisa Futoransky; Published by Leviathan, Argentina, 2019)
- Identities (2019, Romanian; published by Detectiv Literar, Bucharest; translated from Hebrew into Romanian by Menachem Falek)

(This book consists of selected poems from Microcosm, originally in Hebrew, published by Gvanim, Tel-Aviv, Israel 2014)

- Portrait of a Poet (2020, Hebrew), Beth-Eked Sfarim Publishers. Tel-Aviv, Israel.

=== Published Hebrew-English dialogue book ===
- (Conversations for the Study of Hebrew-English), entitled: Where to Go? Jerusalem: Rubin Mass Publishers, 2017.
