= Shirley Kaufman =

American-Israeli poet and translator

- שירלי קאופמן
- Born: June 5, 1923; Seattle, Washington, U.S.
- Died: September 25, 2016 (aged 93); San Francisco, California, U.S.
- Education: James A. Garfield High School
- Alma mater: San Francisco State University
- Occupation: Poet
- Children: 3
- Writing career
- Genre: Poetry

Shirley Kaufman Daleski (Hebrew: שירלי קאופמן דלסקי; June 5, 1923, in Seattle – September 25, 2016 in San Francisco) was an American-Israeli poet and translator.

== Life ==
Her parents immigrated from Poland. She grew up in Seattle and graduated from James A. Garfield High School in 1940 and from the University of California, Los Angeles in 1944, and in 1946 she married Dr. Bernard Kaufman, Jr. They had three daughters: Sharon (b. 1948), Joan (b. 1950) and Deborah (b. 1955). She studied at San Francisco State University with Jack Gilbert.

She married Hillel Matthew Daleski and immigrated to Jerusalem, Israel in 1973.

Her daughter, poet and playwright Debra Kaufman, made a short film about her poem "Ezekiel's Wheels".

Her work has appeared in Ploughshares, Harper's, The American Poetry Review, and The New Yorker.

She died from Alzheimer's disease at the age of 93.

== Awards ==
- 1979 NEA Fellowship
- 1989 Alice Fay Di Castagnola Award of the Poetry Society of America
- 1990/1991 Shelley Memorial Award

== Works ==
=== Poetry ===
- "Cyclamen"; "The Last Threshold", Poets Against War
- "Milk", Poetry Foundation
- Bread and Water. Winter 1990–1991.
- The Temples of Khajuraho. Spring 1988.
- After the Wars. Spring 1984.
- The Floor Keeps Turning. University of Pittsburgh Press. 1970. ISBN 9780822931904.
- Gold Country. University of Pittsburgh Press. 1973. ISBN 9780822932697.
- Looking at Henry Moore's Elephant Skull Etchings in Jerusalem During the War. Greensboro, North Carolina: Unicorn Press. 1977. ISBN 978-0-87775-108-3. second edition, 1979
- Hebrew translation by Dan Pagis, Tel Aviv: 1980
- From One Life to Another. University of Pittsburgh Press. 1979. ISBN 978-0-8229-5300-5.
- Claims. New York: The Sheep Meadow Press. 1984. ISBN 978-0-935296-53-2.
- Rivers of Salt. Port Townsend, Washington: Copper Canyon Press. 1993. ISBN 978-1-55659-055-9.
- Roots in the Air: New and Selected Poems. Port Townsend, Washington: Copper Canyon Press. 1996. ISBN 978-1-55659-055-9.
- Me-Hayyim le-Hayyim Aherim (selected poems in Hebrew translated by Aharon Shabtai, Dan Miron and Dan Pagis). Jerusalem: 1995
- Un abri pour nostêtes (selected poems in French translated by Claude Vigée). Bilingual edition, Le Chambon-sur-Lignon, France: 2003
- Threshold. Port Townsend, Washington: Copper Canyon Press. 2003. ISBN 978-1-55659-192-1.
- Ezekiel's Wheels. Port Townsend, Washington: Copper Canyon Press. 2009. ISBN 978-1-55659-307-9.

=== Translations ===
- Abba Kovner (1971). My Little Sister. London. ISBN 978-0-932440-20-4. 2nd edition 1986
- Abba Kovner (1973). A Canopy in the Desert. University of Pittsburgh Press. ISBN 978-0-8229-5232-9.
- Scrolls of Fire, translated from the Hebrew of Abba Kovner. Tel Aviv: 1978
- Amir Gilboa (1979). The Light of Lost Suns. New York: Persea Books. ISBN 978-0-89255-037-1.
- Judith Herzberg (1988). But What: Selected Poems of Judith Herzberg. Oberlin, Ohio: Oberlin College Press. ISBN 978-0-932440-24-2.
- Meir Wieselteir (Fall 2003). The Flower of Anarchy: Selected Poems. University of California Press. ISBN 978-0-520-23553-3.
- Shirley Kaufman; Galit Hasan-Rokem; Tamar Hess, eds. (1999). Hebrew feminist poems from antiquity to the present: a bilingual anthology. Feminist Press. ISBN 978-1-55861-224-2.

=== Anthologies ===
- Robert Hass; David Lehman, eds. (2001). "The Emperor of China". The Best American Poetry 2001. Simon and Schuster. ISBN 978-0-7432-0384-5.
