= Hedva Harechavi =

Israeli poet (1941–2025)

Hedva Harekhavi חדוה הרכבי
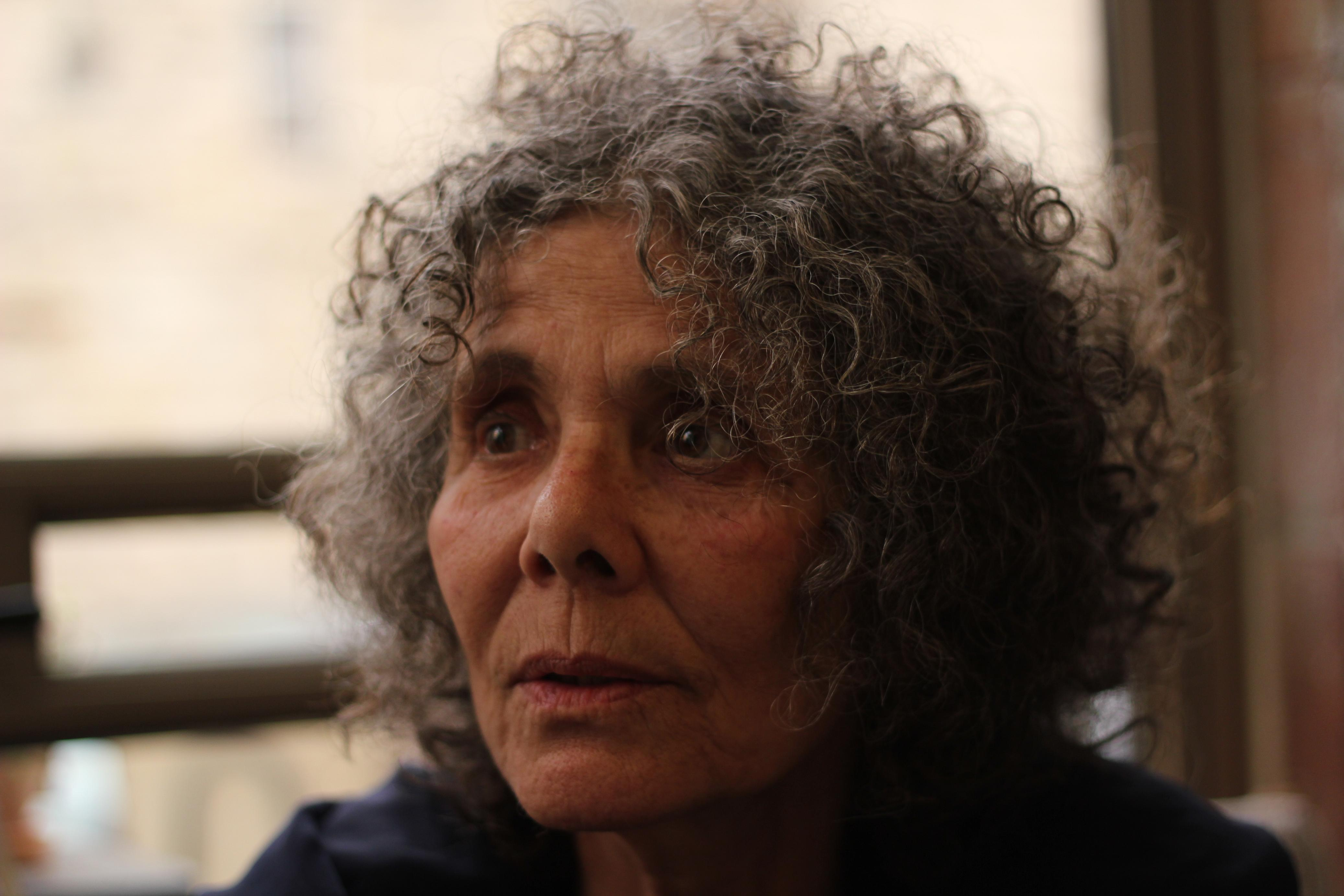
- Born: 28 January 1941; Degania Bet, Mandatory Palestine
- Died: 28 December 2025 (aged 84)
- Education: Betzalel Academy of Arts and Design
- Notable work: Because He is A King
- Awards: The Rachel Newman Prize, The Levi Eshkol Prime Minister's Prize for Hebrew Writers, 1982 and 1992, The Yehuda Amihai Prize, 2010, The Ramat Gan Prize, 2011, The ACUM Prize for Poetry, 2013, The Bialik Prize for Hebrew Literature, 2014

Hedva Harekhavi (Hebrew: חדוה הרכבי; 28 January 1941 – 28 December 2025) was an Israeli poet and visual artist.

== Life and career ==
Harekhavi was born in 1941 in Kibbutz Degania Bet, one of the oldest kibbutzim in Israel. Harechavi had one child, Elisha, who died at a young age. She lived most of her life in Jerusalem.

Harekhavi was a graduate of the Bezalel Academy of Art in Jerusalem. Her art works have been exhibited in one-person shows in Israel and in many group shows in Israel and abroad.

Her first poems, published in the Hebrew daily Al Hamishmar (1967), were submitted for publication by the Hebrew poet Leah Goldberg (1917–1970). Goldberg later selected and prepared for publication also Harekhavi's first book of Hebrew poetry, Ki Hu Melech (Because He Is A King), 1974, which received the Rachel Newman Poetry Prize. Her poems have been translated into many languages including English, Arabic, Russian and German and have appeared in numerous publications and anthologies.

Her major collection of poetry, A Bird that is Inside Stands Outside: Poems, 1962-2008, was published in 2009 by the HaKibbutz HaMeuhad publishing house and the Bialik Institute in Jerusalem - two of Israel's major publishers of Hebrew poetry. Her most recent book, Rana, was published in 2014 by the HaKibbutz HaMeuchad Publisher.

Harechavi is known for writing poems that are heavy in repetition, which implies that the reader is not listening, further exacerbating her emotions. She is considered to be a part of the feminist movement of poetry, taking the linguistics of ancient Hebrew texts and using them as an inspiration for her poetry.

As an artist, she mainly painted in watercolor.

Harechavi won several prizes in poetry, among them the Prime Minister Prize for Poetry in 1982 and 1993, and The Yehuda Amichai Prize for poetry in 2010. She is considered to be one of the Israeli great female poets.

Harechavi died from cancer on 28 December 2025 at the age of 84.

== Prizes ==
- The Rachel Newman Prize for Ki Hu Melech (Because He Is A King, 1974)
- The Levi Eshkol Prime Minister's Prize for Hebrew Writers, 1982 and 1992
- The Yehuda Amihai Prize, 2010
- The Ramat Gan Prize, 2011
- The ACUM Prize for Poetry, 2013
- The Bialik Prize for Hebrew Literature, 2014

== Published works ==
- Because He Is A King – poetry (1974)
- Adi – poetry (1981)
- I Just Want To Tell You – poetry (1985)
- The Other – poetry (1993)
- A Bird That is Inside Stands Outside – poetry (2009)
- Rana – poetry (2014)
- Migo – poetry (2017)
