= Revaz =

Revaz is a Georgian masculine given name; see რევაზ for the etymology. Notable people with the name include:

- Revaz Chelebadze, Soviet football player
- Revaz Dogonadze, Georgian scientist
- Revaz Dzodzuashvili, Georgian football manager
- Revaz Gabashvili, Georgian politician
- Revaz Gamkrelidze (1927–2025), Georgian mathematician
- Revaz Kemoklidze, Georgian football player
- Revaz Tchomakhidze, Russian water polo player

== See also ==
- Ditavan (Armenia), formerly named Revaz
