= Erez Biton =

Algerian-born Israeli poet

- ארז ביטון
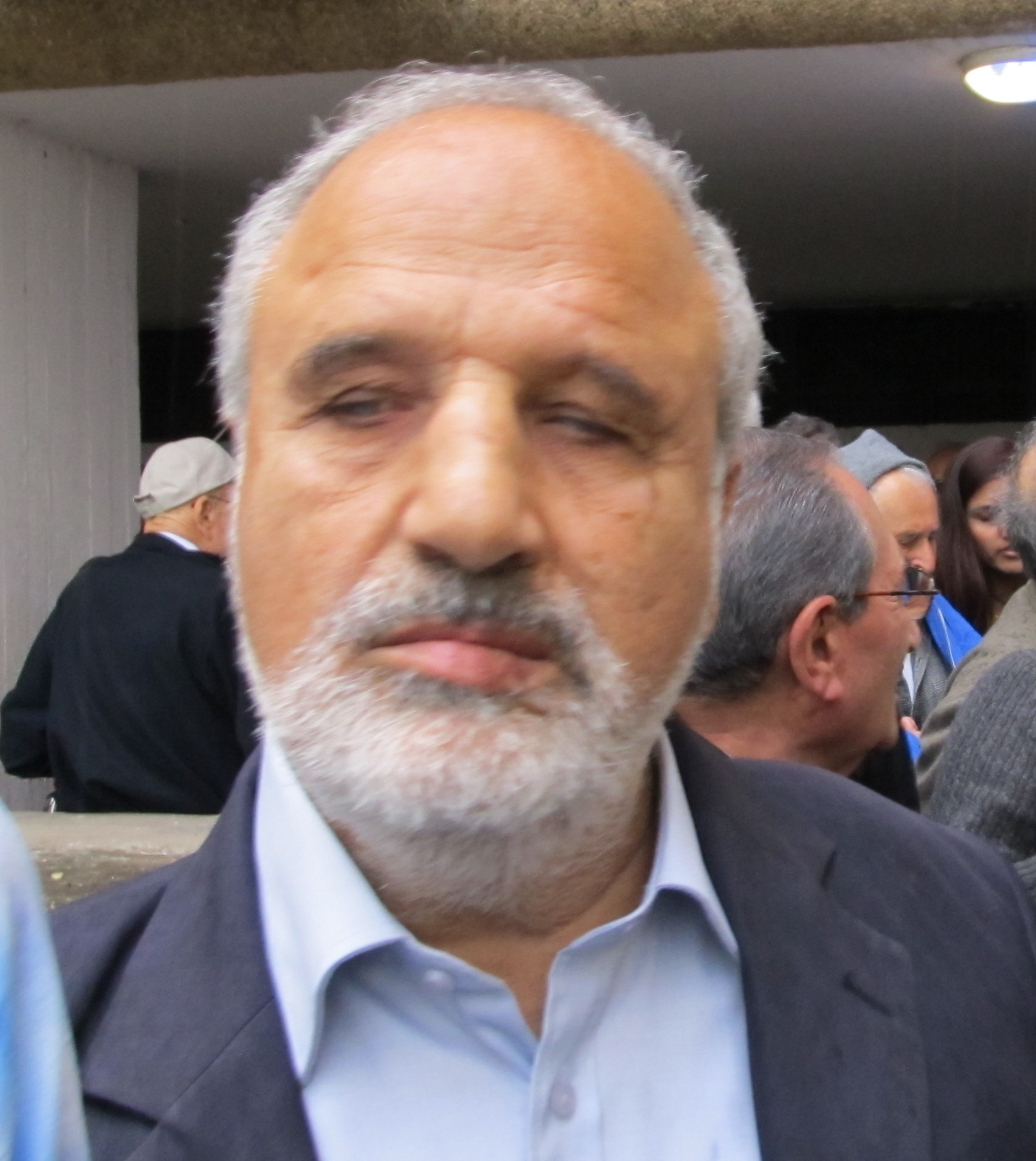
- Erez Biton
- Born: 1942 (age 83–84); Oran, Algeria
- Occupation: Poet
- Known for: Founding father of Mizrahi poetry in Israel
- Awards: Israel Prize (2015); Bialik Prize (2014); Yehuda Amichai Prize (2014); Prime Minister's Prize (1988)

Erez Biton (Hebrew: ארז ביטון; born 1942 in Oran, Algeria) is an Algerian-born Israeli poet of Moroccan descent. He is the 2015 recipient of the Israel Prize for Hebrew Literature and Poetry, among other literary awards.

== Biography ==
Erez Biton was born in Oran in a Moroccan Jewish family. His family fled Algeria in 1948, and made aliyah to Israel. He grew up in Lod. At the age of 10, he lost his vision and his left hand to a stray hand grenade that he had found. The following year he went to school at Jerusalem's Institute for the Blind. He earned a B.A. in social work from the Hebrew University in Jerusalem and an M.A. in psychology at Bar-Ilan University. Biton is married to Rachel Calahorra Biton and the couple have two children.

== Career ==
Following his studies, Biton worked as a social worker in Ashkelon for seven years and as a psychologist in an outlying town. He worked as a journalist and published a weekly column in the Israeli mainstream daily Maariv. His first book, Mincha Marokait (Moroccan Gift), published in 1976, established him as the founding father of Mizrahi poetry in Israel.

== Published works ==
=== Poetry ===
- Mincha Maroka'it (Hebrew: מנחה מרוקאית) "Moroccan Gift," Eked, 1976
- Sefer Hana'na (Hebrew: ספר הנענע) "The Book of Mint," Eked, 1979
- Tsipor bein Yabashot (Hebrew: ציפור בין יבשות) "Intercontinental Bird", 1990
- Timbisert, Tsipor Maroka'it (Hebrew: תמביסרת, ציפור מרוקאית), "Timbisert, a Moroccan Bird", Hakibbutz Hameuchad, 2009
- Nofim Khavushei Einayim (Hebrew: נופים חבושי עיניים) "Blindfolded Landscapes", Hakibbutz Hameuchad, 2013
- Bet Hapsanterim (Hebrew: בית הפסנתרים) "The House of Pianos", Hakibbutz Hameuchad, 2015

=== Drama ===
- Sulika (Hebrew: סוליקה) "Soulika", Snir, 2005

== Awards and recognition ==
- (2015) Biton was awarded the Israel Prize for Literature, the first Mizrahi Jew to receive it. The prize committee described his poems as being "the epitome of courageous dealings, sensitive and deep with a wide range of personal and collective experiences centered around the pain of migration, planting roots in the country, and the reestablishment of the Mizrahi identity as an integral part of the overall Israeli portrait."
- (2014) Bialik Prize for Lifetime Achievement
- (2014) The Yehuda Amichai Prize
- (1988) Prime Minister's Prize
- (1982) Miriam Talpir Prize

== See also ==
- Israeli literature
