= Inbal Eshel Cahansky =

Israeli poet

Inbal Eshel Cahansky ענבל אשל כהנסקי
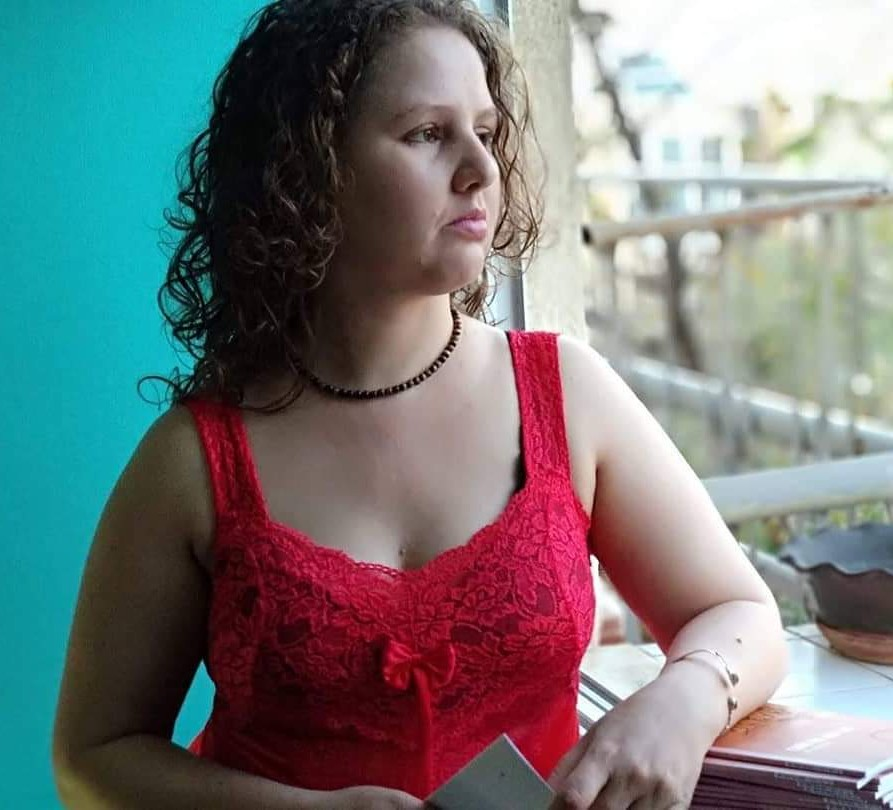
- Born: 1977 (age 48–49); Jerusalem
- Occupations: Poet, literary editor

Inbal Eshel Cahansky (Hebrew: ענבל אשל כהנסקי; born in 1977) is an Israeli poet, literary editor and feminist activist.

== Biography ==
Eshel Cahansky was born in 1977, in Jerusalem. In 2000, she completed her BA in behavioral science at the College of Management Academic Studies. Her poems have been published in literary journals, including Iton 77, Carmel, Social Poetry, and Anonymous Fish, as well as in daily newspapers, such as Haaretz, Maariv, and Yedioth Ahronoth.

Her poetry deals with several central issues: Being a mother to a daughter, dealing with a neurological syndrome. and erotica. Her first poetry collection, Wilds of Day, was published in 2009. A total of four collections of her poems have been published.

Eshel Cahansky is active in the Israeli poetry scene, participating in poetry readings, and she edits poetry and conducts poetry reading events. She is co-founder of several poetry groups, and together with Gal Elgar and Hani Tsafrir, Eshel Cahansky manages the popular Facebook page "Women's Poetry – a Poem a Day". She is also active in book surfing, and a social-economic initiative called "The Garden of Scent and Shadows" in Ra'anana Park.

In recent years, Eshel Cahansky has begun creating multi-disciplinary art, focusing on mixed-media painting and scorched wood. Her works have been exhibited in various venues in Israel. Her first solo exhibition took place in Tel Aviv in September 2018.

Eshel Cahansky has a neurological condition called essential myoclonus, which is characterized by hypnic jerks and stammering. Her second book, Samael My Love, deals with the worsening of her condition and her coping with her disability.

Eshel Cahansky lives in Ra'anana, with her life partner and their child.

== Works ==
- פראי היום Carmel, 2009, Pardes, 2017 The Wilds of Day
- סמאל אהובי Pardes, 2013 Samael My Beloved
- שואגת בלולאת-אינסוף Pardes, 2016 Roaring in an Infinite Loop
- במקום אחר חוץ לזמן Pardes, 2019 In the Other Place Out of Time
