= Yehezkel Nafshy =

Israeli poet and writer (born 1977)

Yehezkel Nafshy (Hebrew: יחזקאל נפשי; born 24 November 1977) is an Israeli poet and writer. Yehezkel was born in Petah Tikva, Israel. He began his literary career at a young age.

== Career ==
At age 17, he first published fantasy stories in magazines such as wiz, Last Sorcerer and others, often using pseudonyms. When he was 20, he was hospitalized for a year and a half due to a rare birth defect. During his stay at the hospital he wrote his book Opening Now that won the Eisenberg prize and many literary grants.

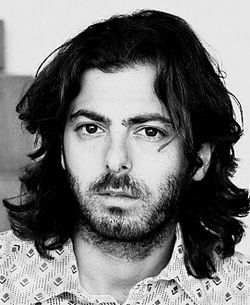
Yehezkel Nafshy

His poems have been translated into Arabic, Hindi, French, English, German and Russian. His poems were turned into songs by singers including Dan Toren, Eyal Gazit, Jasmine Even and Abigail Cohen. His Poem "At the Hour of the Objects" composed by singer E. B. Dan and was playing on the radio and the Israeli music channel 24. Nafshy was the youngest deputy editor of the literature journal, Moaznaim between 2003 and 2005 alongside poet Moshe Ben Shaul.

In March 2013, he published the first volume of his trilogy Self Portrait at Emda publishing house. The third edition of the first volume, entitled when fear of god falls upon me, was published in June 2013.

Yehezkel organized a series of literary evenings at the theatre Habima called "Report on the Human Condition" which combine poets, writers and musicians such as Jeremy Kaplan, Dan Toren, Dudi Levy and others. He was chief editor to the series of exhibitions "Poet's dialog" and editor of the literary corner on the "campus voice" radio station. in 2011, he participated in the project musical spells by Jasmine Even.

== On the poet and his creation ==
- Mini-site on literature and poetry of T. Greco.
- Eli Eshed, grace of god
- Eli Eshed, Yehezkel Nafshy's poets and artists dialog
- Mati Shemoelof, joy the young poetry, KETEM, issue 2, February 2007
- Galit Giat on Self Portrait on YouTube Kol Yisrael

=== Interviews ===
- Interview on Self Portrait on YouTube Channel 1 (Israel) with Yehezkel Nafshy
- Boaz Cohen interviews Yehezkel Nafshy, 16.6.2008, Globes
- Yehezkel Nafshy interviews on his book, Self Portrait on Maariv, The Marker
- Interview on Self Portrait on YouTube on Erev Hadash with Harel Segal
- Interview on Self Portrait on YouTube on "Madafim" show in Kol Ha Campus.
- A chapter from Yehezkel Nafshy's book, Self Portrait on ynet.
- A Writer?! : Yehezkel Nafshy interviews about his book Self Portrait for nrg.
- Interview on Self Portrait on YouTube on Tal Man's TV show.
- Interview on Self Portrait on YouTube by Amir Lev
