= Dory Manor =

Israeli poet

- דורי מנור
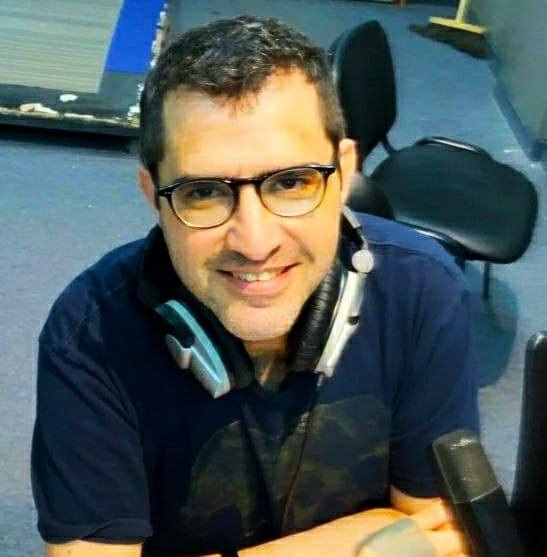
- Born: 11 September 1971
- Occupations: Poet, translator, literary editor, university teacher
- Writing career
- Notable awards: Prime Minister's Prize for Hebrew Literary Works, Tchernichovsky Prize, Yehuda Amichai Prize, Chevalier des Arts et des Lettres, Prime Minister's Prize for Hebrew Literary Works
- Website: www.dorymanor.co.il

Dory Manor (Hebrew: דורי מנור; born 11 September 1971, Tel Aviv, Israel) is an Israeli poet, translator, literary editor, essayist, and educator, writing in Hebrew. His work has garnered several prizes and honors, including the Tchernichovski Prize for Translation (2008) and the French Chevalier dans l'ordre des Arts et des Lettres (2018). As of 2020, Manor published five books of poetry, dozens of literary translations – especially from French (Baudelaire, Mallarmé, Valéry, Rimbaud, Hugo) – and is the founding editor of the Hebrew literary journal Ho! (since 2005). He also edits books of poetry by other Hebrew poets. In addition to his poetic and translation work, Manor has published the memoir Sharav Rishon (2022), the essay collection The Blessing of Babel (2024), and the novel Hof HaDatim (Turn, Turn, Turn, 2025). He is also the co-founder and editor-in-chief of Altneuland Press, the first Hebrew-language publishing house established outside Israel since the 1940s. Manor lived for a decade in Paris before relocating to Berlin in 2019, where he has been based since.

== Early life and education ==
Manor was born in Tel Aviv to a Jewish Israeli family. During his high school studies, he developed an interest in the French language and in French literature. As a teenager, Manor discovered he was attracted to men, and experienced loneliness and fear, in what he later described as an atmosphere of intolerance of homosexuality in Israel at the time, and a lack of inspiring, visible homosexuals in the Israeli public sphere. He remained closeted until his early twenties, and came out some time after returning from New York City and encountering the poetry of Allen Ginsberg.

He published his first translations into Hebrew, of poems from Baudelaire's Les Fleurs du Mal, when he was 18 and serving in the Israeli Defense Force (as a producer and broadcast editor at the army radio station), in the literary supplement of Israeli newspaper Ha'aretz.

In 1995 he moved to Paris to study French and literature at the Paris Diderot University. He completed a Diplôme d'Études Supérieur Appliqué degree in the University of Paris 8 Vincennes-Saint-Denis in 2000, and a doctorate with honors from the Institut national des langues et civilisations orientales (INALCO) in 2017. His doctoral dissertation topic was "Baudelaire in Hebrew (1890-present): his reception, influence, and translations". During his time at INALCO, Manor also taught Hebrew literature.

== Literary work ==
=== Hebrew poetry ===
Manor has published five volumes of original poetry so far. The first, titled Minority (Hebrew: מיעוט), published in 2000, contains original poetry as well as several classic French poems in translation. It was shortly followed, in 2001, by the standalone publication of a libretto Manor co-wrote with poet Anna Herman for an opera named Alpha and Omega (music by Gil Shohat), based on a series of lithographs by Edvard Munch. In 2005, Manor published another volume of original Hebrew poetry and translations from the French, titled Baritone (Hebrew: באריטון). In 2012, a comprehensive collection of Manor's poetic work was published under the title The Center of the Flesh (Hebrew: אמצע הבשר), edited and with a scholarly essay by Hebrew literature professor Dan Miron. As of 2020, Manor's latest book of original poetry is 2019's One Soul Away (Hebrew: נפש אחת אחריך).

==== Poetics ====
Manor is a poet with a distinct style, emphasizing musicality, meter, rhyme, and classical structures (such as sonnets, a form that waned in popularity in the latter third of the 20th century in Hebrew). Manor does not reject free verse, noting that:

A large proportion of what I read before bed is free verse. I don't check line endings before falling in love with a poem. But metered and rhymed verse has a significant advantage, in its ease of memorization. Unmemorizable poetry is less communicative. When poems don't stick in one's memory, it's lethal to poetry.

— Dory Manor, Interview with Tsur Ehrlich, published in Makor Rishon, 8-Jul-2005

Of the craft of poetry, Manor said:

I don't believe in inspiration, and when it comes, I resist it. I believe a poet must be above all an expert craftsperson. The poet must have complete mastery of the technical tools of the craft, and write consciously and deliberately, rather than in the throes of some great passion, which would usually guarantee the writing of awful pretentious poetry. And the muse? Let's leave her to those who believe in fairies and wizards.

— Dory Manor, Interview with Boaz Cohen, published in Globes, 2-Mar-2009

Nonetheless, Manor regards himself as a non-prolific poet, remarking:

I have always written little, and with difficulty, and have only published a fairly small number of original poems to date. I would consider a year in which I wrote ten poems to be a bountiful year, and in most of my writing years I completed no more than four or five poems per year.

— Dory Manor, נתן אלתרמן, אבוי, Nathan Alterman, Alas, published in Ha'aretz, 15-Apr-2018

==== Early reception and the meter-and-rhyme controversy ====
In 2001, following the publication of Manor's first two books – Minority and Alpha and Omega – Benny Ziffer, longtime editor of the literary supplement of Ha'aretz, who had previously published Manor's early translations of Baudelaire, sparked a lively debate on poetic form when he wrote a glowing review of the two books, noting that "forty years after [the music of poetry] was trampled by an avantgarde aspiring to plain speech", Manor's poetry is "a watershed moment for Hebrew poetry" and praising the "welcome nerve to go back to basics in poetry, as though [Hebrew free verse poets] Amichai, Wollach, and Wieseltier never existed".

This unusually warm reception by the editor of a prestigious Hebrew literary periodical led to a number of responses, and started a public controversy, mostly published in later issues of the same literary supplement of Ha'aretz. The most influential dissent was by veteran Hebrew poet Nathan Zach, whose poetic "rebellion" against the then-regnant poetics of Nathan Alterman in the mid-1950s was so impactful it led to a wide rejection of meter and rhyme in almost all Hebrew poetry written after Zach's early books. In the article Zach submitted to Ziffer as a response to Ziffer's praise, he rejected Manor's poetics as "regressive", "epigonic" (e.g. of Manor's admired Baudelaire), as well as mocked Manor's poetic exaggeration, in the titular poem "Minority": "O, country all of whose poets are straight!". Zach did acknowledge that his own epigones have often failed to apply "a sufficiently-musical ear", as free verse requires "even more than the tam-tam trance of metered verse", but asserted that "the solution cannot be to return to Alterman and Baudelaire".

Manor responded to Zach's attack, in an article also published in Ha'aretz, defending his poetics and denying the allegation he rejects all free verse or the entire poetic generations from Zach onwards. He also compared his own poetic exaggeration to Russian poet Marina Tsvetaeva's similar exaggeration in her line "All poets are Jews".

Yoram Bronowski, another critic writing in Ha'aretz's literary supplement, also praised Manor's Minority, calling Manor "a master of the [Hebrew] language, a virtuoso with few peers in the history of Hebrew poetry, perhaps comparable to Ephraim Luzzatto". Bronowski also appreciated Manor's included translation of Paul Verlaine and Arthur Rimbaud's co-written "Sonnet to an ass-hole", judging it "a translation of genius, like (almost) all of Manor's translations", and that Manor recreated the French poem as "an original, witty, surprising Hebrew poem". Bronowski notes Manor excels at translating "the poets considered 'untranslatable', like Baudelaire and Mallarmé", and that Manor's rendition of two verse fables by La Fontaine are "among the peaks of the art of translation, a marvel of wit and elegance", but that with "a somewhat 'simpler' poet such as Auden, he is somewhat less successful, though still employing his fantastic language gift."

==== Later reception ====
Israeli historian, essayist, and translator Amotz Giladi wrote of Manor's third book, Baritone, that in it Manor "opens a window to the laboratory where the miracle of the alchemy of the word takes place", citing several examples of what he considers particularly poems executed in a form particularly well-suited to their semantic content. In general, Giladi cautioned against "rejecting classical forms a priori, with no regard to how they are used and how well they work with the content". He identified the polarity between childhood and adulthood as a key to the book. Fellow poet and translator Rafi Weichert, on the other hand, rejected the book entirely, accusing Manor of a "calculated attempt to distance himself from Nathan Zach", and asserting that Manor's poetry is insincere and uninspired. At the same time, he also complains that Manor chose to publish only 28 original poems in Baritone (the other half of the book being Manor's translations of French poetry), interpreting it as further evidence supporting his aesthetic judgment. Nonetheless, Weichert allows that some of Manor's poems are "excellent", singling out "פרימה" ("unraveling"). Poet and translator Amir Beker reviewed the book, writing that "Manor's work is vibrant with [a mixture of] contemporary Hebrew and admirably literary language, slang and foreign terms with genuine richness; this is much more than reclaiming words from oblivion and reintroducing them into circulation". He, too, identifies a focus on time and personal memory in the book's themes. "Manor is a total poet.", he adds, "He treats his work and its themes with gravity, and even when he writes about his loves, his poetry is never cloying. The hints of humor here and there, too, elicit laughter in the reader that isn't only amused." Tel Aviv University professor of literature Ziva Shamir praised the book, and Manor's poetics in general, noting that "the regnant free verse imported into Hebrew literature 50 years ago is today the epigone's refuge", and "Manor's revolution is welcome and necessary". She accuses the "old guard" of unjustifiably resisting change, and observes that "it is no accident that poetry lost its appeal to the general public", expressing the hope Manor's poetics are the beginning of a change that would restore poetry's central position in Hebrew culture. She worries, however, that Manor's "aestheticist", "art for art's sake" poetics would not be sufficient to usher in a new era in Hebrew poetry.

In The Center of the Flesh, Manor's fourth book, Hebrew literature scholar and novelist Lilach Netanel found "the beautiful poet; the sensual, erotic poet", as well as "the dead poet", considering this book's retrospective quality to be Manor's contemplation of his own future demise. Classics scholar and Hebrew poet Reviel Netz praised Manor for his words "having a tactile quality, words-as-sculpture", as well as for the "musical perfection" of his lines. Netz notes Manor's use of longer lines than is common in Hebrew or English metered poetry. He observes that "for 20 years now, Manor has been working to create both the sound and the audience" for the music of his poetry. Poet, critic, and literary editor Eli Hirsh interpreted this volume's inclusion of lyrics Manor wrote to music by Israeli composer Sasha Argov as "testimony to the centrality of music to Manor's poetics". He identifies "fertility and barrenness" as a key polarity in Manor's symbolic vocabulary, and writes that Manor regards poetry as "an avenue of fertility" for homosexuals, and a way to "exist beyond death".

Of Manor's fifth book, One Soul Away, critic and poet Eli Hirsh wrote: "fascinating and diverse, full of beauty and vitality". Hirsh maintains that in this book, Manor has matured and is expressing key events in his life in "open, sharp, revealing, and occasionally cruel words", having given up on his youthful revolutionary ideas. Hirsh asserts that despite Manor's early success at a young age, Manor should be considered a "slow-maturing poet", and considers this book to be Manor's mature work.

==== Prose ====
- Sharav Rishon (“First Heatwave”, 2022) Manor’s first work of prose, the memoir Sharav Rishon, was published in 2022 by Nine Lives Press. The book, a lyrical coming-of-age chronicle, received enthusiastic critical acclaim, including positive reviews by Ofra Offer-Oren, Rachel Faran, and literary critic Arik Glasner.

- The Blessing of Babel (2024) In 2024, Manor published a collection of essays, literary reflections, and critical pieces titled The Blessing of Babel (Ha-Berakha shel Bavel) with Hakibbutz Hameuchad. The book gathers two decades of Manor’s writing on Hebrew poetry, world literature, translation, aesthetics, and cultural identity.
- Hof HaDati'im: Turn, Turn, Turn (2025) Manor’s debut novel, Hof HaDati'im (“The Religious Beach”), subtitled Turn, Turn, Turn, was published in November 2025 by Kinneret Zmora-Dvir. The novel, set in 1990s Tel Aviv, explores sexuality, adolescence, trauma, and artistic awakening, and received wide critical attention upon publication.

=== Translation into Hebrew ===
Even before publishing his own original poetry, Manor began submitting translations into Hebrew of 19th-century French poetry to the literary supplement of Ha'aretz, beginning with poems by Baudelaire. These translations were very well received, and led to Manor's publishing several volumes of translations between 1997 and 2017.

Manor mainly translates verse, and publishes verse translations regularly in literary supplements (primarily Ha'aretz) and in the literary journal he is founding editor of, Ho!. As separate books, Manor published two volumes of poetry by Baudelaire – a selection from Les Fleurs du Mal (1997), Le Spleen de Paris: Petits Poèmes en prose (1997); a collection of Paul Valéry's poetry named le Cimetière marin (2011); a collection of poems by Mallarmé named le tonnerre muet (2012) – all from French. In 2017, Manor published a volume of selected poems by Greek poet Cavafy, which he jointly translated with Israela Azulay, naming it Remember, Body.

In prose, Manor translated Jean Echenoz's novel Je m'en vais (2001), Jules Verne's Le docteur Ox (2004), Voltaire's Candide (2006), Françoise Sagan's Bonjour Tristesse (2009), and Molière's play l'Avare.

Earlier on, Manor translated several non-fiction books, including Flaubert's Letters to Louise Colet (1999), Descartes's Meditations on First Philosophy (2001), Baudelaire's Les Paradis Artificiels (2003), and Raymond Aron's La Tragédie algérienne (2005).

=== Literary editing ===
In 1993, Manor founded, with fellow young poets Ori Pekelman and Gal Kober, a literary journal named Ev (Hebrew: אֵב; a literary Hebrew word meaning a young plant's shoot), where they published original and translated poetry, as well as literary essays. The journal featured a distinct poetics favoring highly musical verse, and published mostly younger authors, including Shimon Adaf, Anna Herman, Eli Bar-Yahalom, Benny Mer, and Ayana Erdal. Three issues were published between 1993 and 1996, and the journal was discontinued when Pekelman and Manor moved to Paris to attend university. Despite its short life, its poetics were influential on a generation of poets. Literary scholar and critic Nissim Calderon credits Manor and Ev with directing his attention to musicality as the primary dimension of the changes of poetics in Hebrew poetry in the latter half of the 20th century.

=== Publishing and series editing ===
Between 2006 and 2012, Manor served as editor-in-chief of the book publishing department of Sal Tarbut Artsi, an Israeli state-funded art support program. Of his work as the person selecting titles for publication by the department, and working with the authors, he remarked in an interview:

When I compose a poem by myself on the page, a drink in my hand, when I organize a poetry event, edit a literary journal, or work in a public organization, it is the very same kind of act: In all of these roles, I am a culture activist, working to widen the audience for cultural works.

— Dory Manor, Interview with Tamar Rotem, published in Ha'aretz, 30-Aug-2009

==== Oh! – Literary Journal* (2005 – present) ====
Since 2005, Manor has served as the founding editor-in-chief of Oh!, a prominent Hebrew literary journal dedicated to contemporary poetry, essays, and translation. The journal is widely regarded as one of the most influential platforms in the Israeli literary landscape, noted for its commitment to musicality, meter, rhyme, and a broad international outlook.

Oh! publishes original Hebrew poetry and literary prose alongside extensive thematic sections devoted to world poetry in translation, featuring material from a wide range of languages and traditions. Over the years, the journal has become known both for introducing new poetic voices and for serving as a home for established authors.

The journal has featured contributions by many major Hebrew writers and poets, including Maya Arad, Roy Chen, Yehoshua Kenaz, Dan Miron, Ronit Matlon, Yuval Shimoni, Dror Mishani, Yaakov Biton, Shimon Adaf, Nurit Gertz, Matan Hermoni, Almog Behar, Menachem Perry, Yaara Shechori, Avraham B. Yehoshua, Ilana Bernstein, Hedva Harekhavi, Nurit Zarchi, Reuven Namdar, and Michal Ben-Naftali.

==== Altneuland Press ====
In 2023, Manor co-founded Altneuland Press in Berlin together with writer Moshe Sakal, serving as the publishing house’s editor-in-chief. Altneuland is the first Hebrew-language publishing house founded outside Israel since the 1940s, operating as a fully independent, privately funded press with no institutional affiliation to the State of Israel and receiving no financial support from Israeli public bodies. Based in Berlin, the press publishes original Hebrew literature as well as translations into German and English, emphasizing a multilingual, transnational approach to contemporary Hebrew writing.

Altneuland’s list includes works by Lea Aini, Maya Arad (in English and German), Yael Neeman (in German), Gish Amit, Marit Ben Israel, Orna Coussin, Hillel Cohen (in Hebrew and German), and Itamar Orlev (in English and German), and Ruth Margalit (English, German, Hebrew) among others.

Further information on the press and its vision appears in Haaretz’s profile of the publishing house, published in November 2024, and on Altneuland’s official website.

== Music and radio ==
Manor frequently collaborates with musicians, either in the context of setting his own poetry to music, or as a translator of lyrics, especially from French, to be performed in Hebrew. Notably, Manor worked with Israeli musician Shlomi Shaban, translating into Hebrew lyrics by Jacques Brel and Georges Brassens, as well as with musicians Yoni Rechter, Ninet Tayeb, Maor Cohen, and Rona Kenan.

Between 2010 and 2015, Manor (with Shlomzion Kenan, and later with Rona Kenan) broadcast a weekly late-night radio program on the Israeli Galey Tzahal radio channel, called Tsipporey Layla Mitpaytot, a variant of the longstanding program Tsipporey Layla. The program featured songs, poems, and short passages around a theme, and was edited by Manor and his co-broadcasters.

== Personal life ==
Manor is openly gay and lives with his partner the writer Moshe Sakal.

== Honors ==
- (Israeli) Prime Minister's Prize for Hebrew Literary Works (2007)
- Tchernichovsky Prize for Translation of World Masterpieces (2008) for his translation of Voltaire's Candide
- (Israeli) Ministry of Culture Prize for Literary Editing (2011) for editing the literary journal Ho!
- The Yehuda Amichai Prize for Hebrew Poetry (2015)
- (Israeli) Prime Minister's Prize for Hebrew Writers (2018)
- Knight of the Order of Arts and Letters (France; French: Chevalier de l'Ordre des Arts et des Lettres; 2019)
