= Yehuda Amichai Prize =

- Country: Israel
- Presented by: Ministry of Culture and Sport; Jerusalem Municipality
- Reward: ₪60,000

The Yehuda Amichai Prize for Hebrew Poetry is a prestigious Israeli literary award established in memory of the poet Yehuda Amichai. The prize is awarded annually by the Israeli Ministry of Culture and Sport, together with the Jerusalem Municipality. It is considered one of the most respected and influential awards in the fields of Hebrew literature and poetry, recognizing outstanding achievement and significant contribution to modern Hebrew poetry.

== History ==
The prize was founded to honor Yehuda Amichai's legacy and to encourage excellence in Hebrew poetic writing. For many years, the chair of the board of trustees was Prof. Dan Laor. Since 2023, the board has been chaired by Prof. Giddon Ticotsky. In recent years, the monetary award has been ₪60,000.

== Past Recipients ==
- 2002 – Agi Mishol; Shin Shifra
- 2004 – Ronny Someck
- 2005 – Mordechai Geldman
- 2006 – Nurit Zarchi
- 2007 – Yitzhak Laor
- 2010 – Shimon Adaf; Hedva Harechavi
- 2012 – Mois Benarroch; Haviva Pedaya
- 2014 – Erez Biton
- 2015 – Dory Manor
- 2017 – Efrat Mishori
- 2024 – Raquel Chalfi
- 2025 – Amichai Chasson

== See also ==
- Hebrew literature
- Israeli poetry
