= Mikhail Kozhukhov =

Russian journalist and television presenter

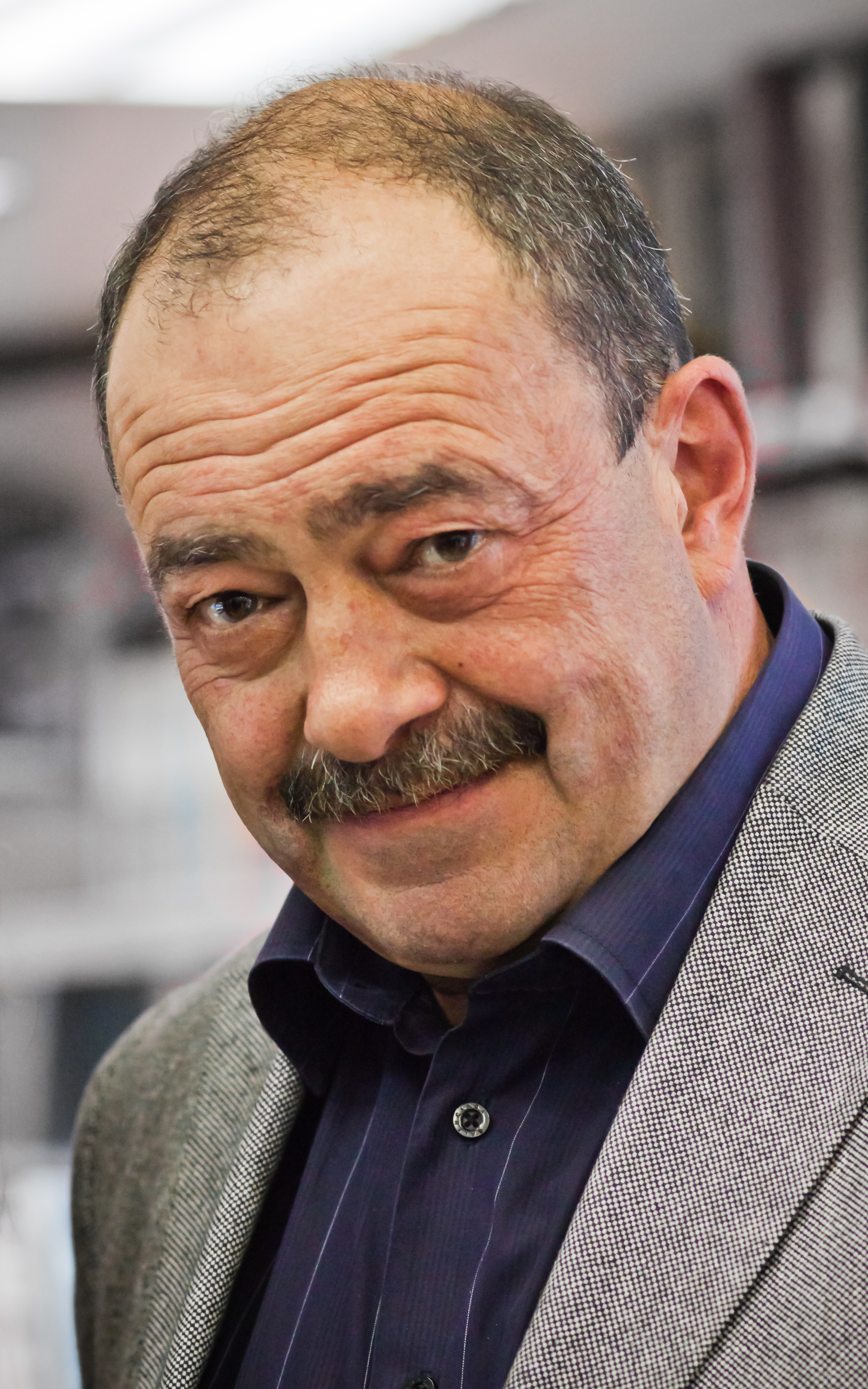
Mikhail Yuryevich Kozhukhov

Mikhail Yuryevich Kozhukhov (Russian: Михаил Юрьевич Кожухов; born 16 December 1956, Moscow) is a Russian journalist and television presenter. Kozhukhov was a host of In Search of Adventures television program, for which he received the TEFI award in 2004; he was also awarded the Order of the Red Star.

Kozhukhov graduated from Moscow State Linguistic University in 1979. In 1985–1989 he worked as a staff reporter of Komsomolskaya Pravda in Afghanistan and lately authored the book Alien Stars Over Kabul. In 1989–1994 Kozhukhov worked for the newspaper Izvestia. In 1996 he started to work in the TV company VID. Kozhukhov was an author and host of the program Sdelay shag (Make a Step) on Russian channel TVS in particular.

In 1999–2000 Kozhukhov has been a press secretary of Vladimir Putin.
