= Mikhail Gendelev =

Russian poet

- Михаи́л Самуэ́левич Ге́нделев
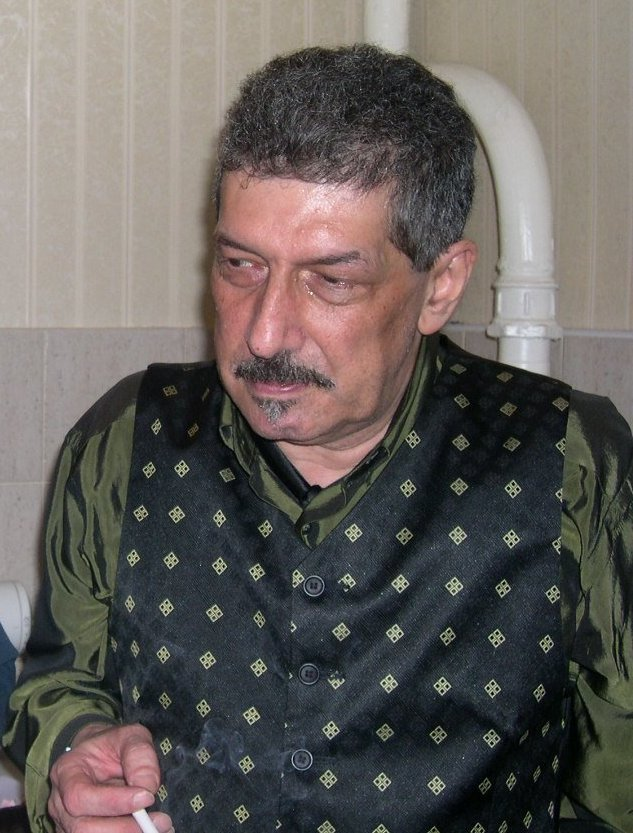
- Born: 1950; Leningrad
- Died: 30 March 2009 (aged 58–59); Tel Aviv
- Education: Leningrad Medical Institute
- Occupation: Poet
- Writing career
- Language: Russian
- Notable work: Стихотворения Михаила Генделева
- Notable awards: Ettinger Prize

Mikhail Samuelevich Gendelev (Russian: Михаи́л Самуэ́левич Ге́нделев, IPA: [mʲɪxɐˈil səmʊˈelʲɪvʲɪdʑ ˈɡʲenʲdʲɪlʲɪf]; 1950 Leningrad – 30 March 2009 Tel Aviv) was a Russian poet who for many years lived in Israel. He is referred as one of the founders Russian-language literature of Israel.

Mikhail Gendelev graduated from Leningrad Medical Institute. He worked as a sport physician. Since 1967 he started to write poetry that was not published in the Soviet Union. In 1977 he emigrated to Israel. Since 1979 he lived in Jerusalem. He participated in the 1982 Lebanon War as a combat medic. In the 1990s he had many publications as a journalist. He was the first president of the Jerusalem Literary Club.

Gendelev was a recipient of several Israeli Literary Prizes including Ettinger Prize and Tsaban Prize. He published poetry in many Russian language magazines including Kontinent and Ekho. Gendelev translated into Russian medieval Jewish poetry including works of Moses ibn Ezra, Solomon ibn Gabirol and Yehuda Alharizi as well as modern Israeli poets like Haim Gouri.

== Works ==
Gendelev is one of the creators of the concept of modern Russophone literature of Israel. Among his books are:

- "Стихотворения Михаила Генделева. 1984",
- "Праздник" (1993),
- "Избранное" (1996),
- "Царь" (1997),
- "В садах Аллаха" (1997),
- "Неполное собрание сочинений" (2003) ISBN 5-94117-054-8
- "Легкая музыка: 1996-2004) ISBN 5-93273-174-5
- "Любовь, война и смерть в воспоминаниях современника"
- "Великое русское путешествие" (Ha-Tor Ha-Rusi Ha-Gadol) ISBN 5-87106-075-7

Gendelev was also a notable food critic and published his Book of Tasty and Unhealthy Food (an obvious reference to the Soviet-era cookbook The Book of Tasty and Healthy Food).
