= Prime Minister's Prize for Hebrew Literary Works =

Israeli Hebrew-language literary prize

- Awarded for: Award to recognize excellence and encourage creative works in Hebrew
- Sponsored by: Ministry of Culture and Sport
- Date: 1969; 57 years ago
- Country: Israel
- Formerly called: Levi Eshkol Literary Award
- Reward: Annual stipend equivalent to a teacher's salary

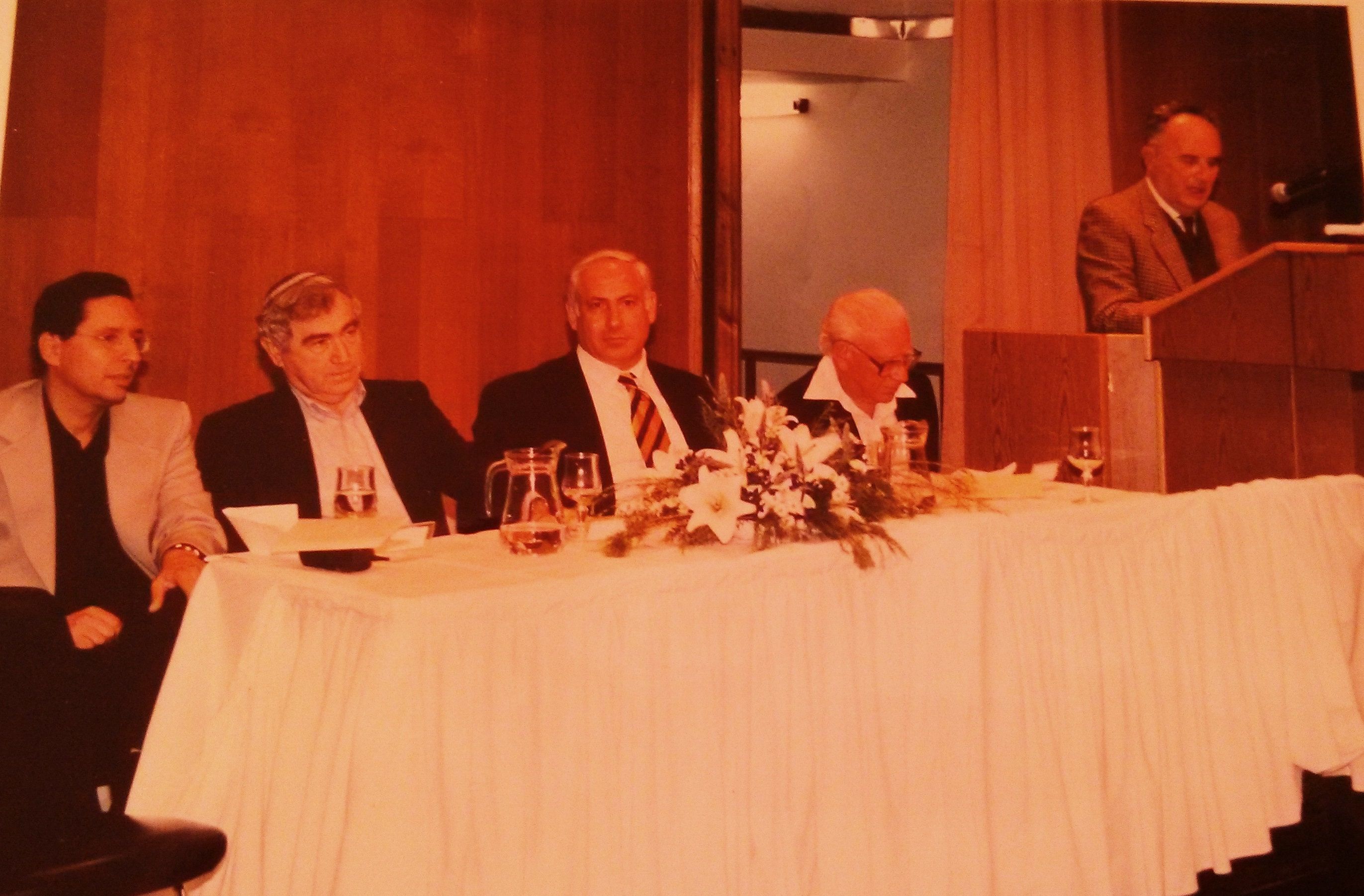
A.B. Yoffe (on the podium) receiving the prize, 1996

The Prime Minister's Prize for Hebrew Literary Works, also known as the Levi Eshkol Literary Award, named after Israel's third Prime Minister, is an annual award granted to writers in the Hebrew language. The prize was established in 1969.

== About the prize ==
The stated purpose of the award is to "appreciate Hebrew literature and encourage excellence in Hebrew literary writing," by providing a financial grant to writers, which would enable them to be free to write for a year. The grant, as of 2016, is NIS 65,000 – the equivalent of a teacher's annual salary. The award was founded by Prime Minister Levi Eshkol and initiated by writer Zelig Lavon, Pinhas Lavon's brother.

The award is granted by the Ministry of Culture from its budget and in accordance with the regulations drawn up by the Ministry, according to which, every three years, a seven-member trustee board is appointed, including three representatives of the Minister of Culture and Sport and four from the Hebrew Writers Association, with a chairperson appointed annually by the Minister. The board appoints a three-member selection committee, which selects up to 14 award recipients per year by majority vote.

The winners are announced in December of the year ending before the calendar year during which the award stipend is provided (hence, for example, 2020 award winners were announced in December 2019).

== Winners ==
=== 1960s ===
Year	Winners
1969	Poetry: Amir Gilboa; Fiction: Aharon Appelfeld, David Shahar, Eliyahu David Shafir; Essays & Criticism: Avraham Kariv

=== 1970s ===
Year	Winners
1970	Poetry: Uri Zvi Greenberg, Yonatan Ratosh; Fiction: Naomi Frankel, Aharon Almog; Essays & Criticism: Yeshurun Keshet
1971	Poetry: Yehoshua Tan-Pi, Yehuda Amichai, Ozer Rabin, S. Shalom; Fiction: Amalia Kahana-Carmon
1972	Poetry: Dan Pagis, Esther Raab; Fiction: Uri Orlev, A. B. Yehoshua; Essays & Criticism: David Canaani
1973	David Avidan, T. Carmi, Arie Sivan, Getzl Kresel, Aharon Megged, Pinchas Sadeh
1974	Poetry: Yair Hurvitz, Zelda, Dov Homsky; Fiction: Hanoch Bartov, Yonat Send, Dan Tsalka
1975	Shulamit Hareven, Moshe Shamir, Natan Yonatan, Avraham Halfi, Tuvya Ruebner, Ehud Ben Ezer
1976	Poetry: Zrubavel Gilad, Eli Netser, Israel Pincas; Fiction: Yitzhak Orpaz, Yehudit Hendel; Criticism: Yitzhak Ikviyahu
1977	Dahlia Ravikovitch, Benjamin Tammuz, Shimon Blass, Meir Wieseltier, Yoav Levitas Halevy, Yehoshua Kenaz
1978	No awards granted
1979	Poetry: Shin Shalom, Haim Be'er, Rivka Miryam; Fiction: Dvora Omer, Amnon Shamosh; Essayist: Rivka Gorfein

=== 1980s ===
Year	Winners
1980	Poetry: Gavriela Elisha, Yaakov Beser, Nurit Zarchi, Anton Shammas; Fiction: Amalia Kahana-Carmon, Amatzia Porat
1981	Amir Gilboa, Eda Zoritte, and others
1982	
1983	
1984	Giora Leshem and others
1985	Poetry: David Avidan, Shimon Tsameret; Fiction: Israel Hameiri, Yotam Reuveni; Playwright: Josef Mundy
1986	Maya Bejerano, Yosef Bar-Yosef, Binyamin Galai, Moshe Dor, Yehudit Kafri, Reuven Miran, Aba Kovner, Yoram Kaniuk, Dan Shavit, Yoram Sharon
1987	Yoseph Sharon, Shulamit Apfel, Yair Hurvitz, Shin Shifra, and others
1988	Dudu Barak, and others
1999	Shin Shifra, and others

=== 1990s ===
Year	Winners
1990	
1991	Ehud Ben Ezer, Shamai Golan, Miriam Eitan, Nurit Zarchi, Yehudit Mosel-Eliazarov
1992	Itamar Ya'oz Kasat, and others
1993	Yaakov Buchan, Haim Be'er, Miriam Akavia, Yosef Ozer, and others
1994	Lea Aini, Israel Eliraz, Hannah Bat Shahar, Batya Gur, Maya Bejerano, Ramy Ditzanny, Yehezkel Yosef, Josef Mundy, Ronit Matalon, Agi Mishol, Aryeh Samo, Ofra Ofer, Dahlia Ravikovitch, Amnon Shamosh
1995	Ofra Offer Oren and others
1996	Yonadav Kaplun, Shimon Shlush, A. B. Yaffe, Rami Saari, Judith Katzir, Maya Bejerano, Nava Semel, and others
1997	Yosef Sharon, Shin Shifra, and others
1998	Dan Armon, and others
1999	Eleonora Lev, and others

=== 2000s ===
Year	Winners
2000	Dorit Rabinyan, and others
2001	Endad Eldan, Alon Alters, Yonatan Ben Nahum, Yitzhak Gormazano Goren, Varda Genosar, Dalia Hertz, Natan Zach, Yechiel Hazak, Orzion Ishay, Yitzhak Laor, Ronny Someck, Eda Zoritte, Orly Castel-Bloom, Roi Reshkes
2002	Gavriela Avigur-Rotem, Thelma Admon, Esther Ettinger, Dror Elimelech, Yaakov Buchan, Tamir Greenberg, Yael Hedaya, Yona Tefer, Shlomit Cohen Asif, Efrat Mishori, Yoram Meltzer, Amnon Navot, Yizhar Smilansky, Alona Kimhi, Dorit Rabinyan, Rivka Raz, Asher Reich, Shlomo Shva
2003	Sharon As, Haya Esther, Alex Epstein, Mishka Ben David, Avraham Bar-Oz, Yitzhak Bar-Yosef, Aliza Greenberg, Dorit Weisman, Esti G. Haim, Haim Lapid, Giora Leshem, Alexander Sand, Eli Amir, Dorit Peleg, Yehudit Rotem, Dan Shavit, Tsipi Shachrur, Leah Snir
2004	Arye Aharoni, Yitzhak Orbach-Orpaz, Lea Aini, Haim Gouri, Rami Ditzanny, Rafi Weichart, Gali-Dana Singer, Sarah Hafri Aflal, Iris Leal, Ran Yagil, Hillel Mittlefunkt, Rami Saari, Avshalom Kaveh, Mirik Snir
2005	Yaron Avitov, Aharon Amir, Maxim Ghilan, Shifra Horn, Amira Hess, Hava Havushi, Tamir Lahav Radelmesser, Eyal Meged, Mira Magen, Michal Snunit, Sayed Kashua, Dahlia Ravikovitch, Yuval Shimoni
2006	Esther Eisen, Dvorah Amir, Shimon Buzaglo, Dror Bornstein, Yitzhak Ben-Ner, Sammy Berdugo, Aviva Doron, Eliaz Cohen, Miri Litvak, Yoram Levi Porat, Ruth Bondy, Lily Perry, Shimon Zimmer, Lior Sternberg
2007	Shimon Adaf, Yehoram Ben-Meir (Pichi), Michal Ben-Naftali, Hanoch Bartov, Hagai Dagan, Anna Herman, Dory Manor, Yael Mishali, Itamar Yaoz-Kassat, Shez, Oded Peled, Judith Katzir, Tuvya Ruebner, Natan Shaham
2008	Aharon Megged, Ruth Almog, Yoel Hoffmann, Yossi Avni-Levy, Suzanne Adams, Tamar Gelbetz, Nira Harel, Goren Agmon, Moshe Dor, Gilad Meiri, Debbie Saar, Liat Kaplan, Shlomo Aviv, Zisi Stavi
2009	Israel Eliraz, Moiz Ben Harosh, Yitzhak Bezalel, Ariel Hirschfeld, Alon Hilu, Hagar Yanai, Einat Yakir, Haim Sabato, Shoham Smith, Naim Araidi, Orna Coussin, Assaf Shor, Tzur Shezaf, Ayelet Shamir

=== 2010s ===
Year	Winners
2010	Egor Schiff, Elisha Porat, Almog Behar, Amnon Navot, Arik Eisenberg, Bracha Serri, Guy Ad, Daniela Carmi, Tal Nitzan, Yirmi Pinkus, Nir Baram, Roni Givati, Tahel Ran, Tamir Greenberg
2011	Orly Castel-Bloom, Elhanan Nir, Assaf Gavron, Gavriela Elisha, Yosef Oren, Yaniv Iczkovits, Yael Hedaya, Yitzhak Bar-Yosef, Israel Wiesler, Israel Pincas, Meir Wieseltier, Mira Meir, Aina Ardel, Tami Shemtov
2012	Dana Amir, Yakir Ben Moshe, Benny Barabash, Michael Bar-Zohar, Ilana Bernstein, Yitzhak Ganuz, Uri Hollander, Sivan Har-Shefi, Nidaa Khoury, Jonathan Yavin, Galia Oz, Ephraim Sidon, Moshe Sakel, Naomi Shmuel
2013	Yehonatan Geffen, Menahem Perry, Amichai Shalev, Moshe Ohayon, Yehuda Atlas, Shulamit Apfel, Yaara Ben David, Amir Gutfreund, Yehezkel Rahamim, Ofra Galbert Avni, Tzipora Dolan, Gail Hareven, Dan Laor, Dror Mishani
2014	Avirama Golan, Alona Frankel, Ofir Tousha Gefla, Eli Eliyahu, Galit Dahan Carlibach, Haim Pesach, Yonadav Kaplun, Miki Ben Canaan, Matan Hermoni, Aliza Greenberg, Eran Bar-Gil, Anat Zacharia, Tzipi Gon-Gross, Zeruya Shalev
2015	Eli Hirsch, Sabina Meseg, Yigal Sarna, Sarah Blau, Yaara Schori, Emuna Elon, Yael Neeman, Ilan Sheinfeld, Tzvika Sternfeld, Dido S. Didovsky, Yaakov Biton, Yosef Ozer, Yossi Sucary
2016	Noga Elbelech, Anat Einhar, Esti G. Haim, Sagi Elnakwe, Hila Lahav, Ran Yagil, Menahem Ben, Alex Epstein, David Tarbai, Yossi Granovski, Sigal Ben Yair, Iris Eliya Cohen, Mira Kedar, Yair Assulin
2017	Yiftach Ashkenazi, Rachel Eshed, Ayman Sikseck, Leah Pilowski, Binyamin Shvili, Navit Barel, Ketzia Alon, Yudit Shachar, Yehuda Atai, Adi Wolfson, Avichai Kimchi, Racheli Avraham Eitan, Dorit Zilberman, Shachar-Mario Mordechai
2018	Bachal Serlawi, Rafi Weichert, Shula Modan, Galila Ron Feder Amit, Dror Bornstein, Nina Pinto-Abecasis, Ziva Shamir, Pini Rabenu, Naomi Ben Gur, Celine Assayag, Hamutal Bar Yosef, Riki Daskal, Hayuta Deutsch, Yonatan Berg
2019	Inbar Ashkenazi, Ariella Goldmintz, Arik Glasner, Tehila Hakimi, Shemi Zarhin, Anat Levin, Dory Manor, Avivit Mishmari, Yoav Alvin, Assaf Inbari, Dorit Kelner, Noam Partom, Maya Tevet Dayan, Shimon Riklin

=== 2020s ===
2020	Shay Aspril, Anat Sharon Belyis, Adi Sorek, Yonit Naaman, Orit Wohlfeiler, Deakla Keydar, Anat Sharon Belyis, Kobi Nissim, Sagit Emet, Yaakov Barzilai, Gidon Tikotzky, Yael Globerman
2021	Hila Blum, Etgar Keret, Nurith Gertz, Yirmi Pincus, Roy Chen, Amichai Chasson, Noa Yedlin, Yannets Levi, Yaakov Z. Meir, Rutu Modan, Levana Moshon, Shira Stav, Eli Shmueli, Shalom Eilati, Tamar Merin
