= Globerman =

Globerman is a surname. Notable people with the surname include:

- Yael Globerman (born 1954), Israeli poet, writer, translator, and educator
- Dror Globerman (born 1977), Israeli TV host, journalist and lecturer.
- Yehoshua Globerman (1905–1947), IDF General

== See also ==
- Glaberman
- Glauberman
