= Haim Be'er =

Israeli writer

- חיים באר
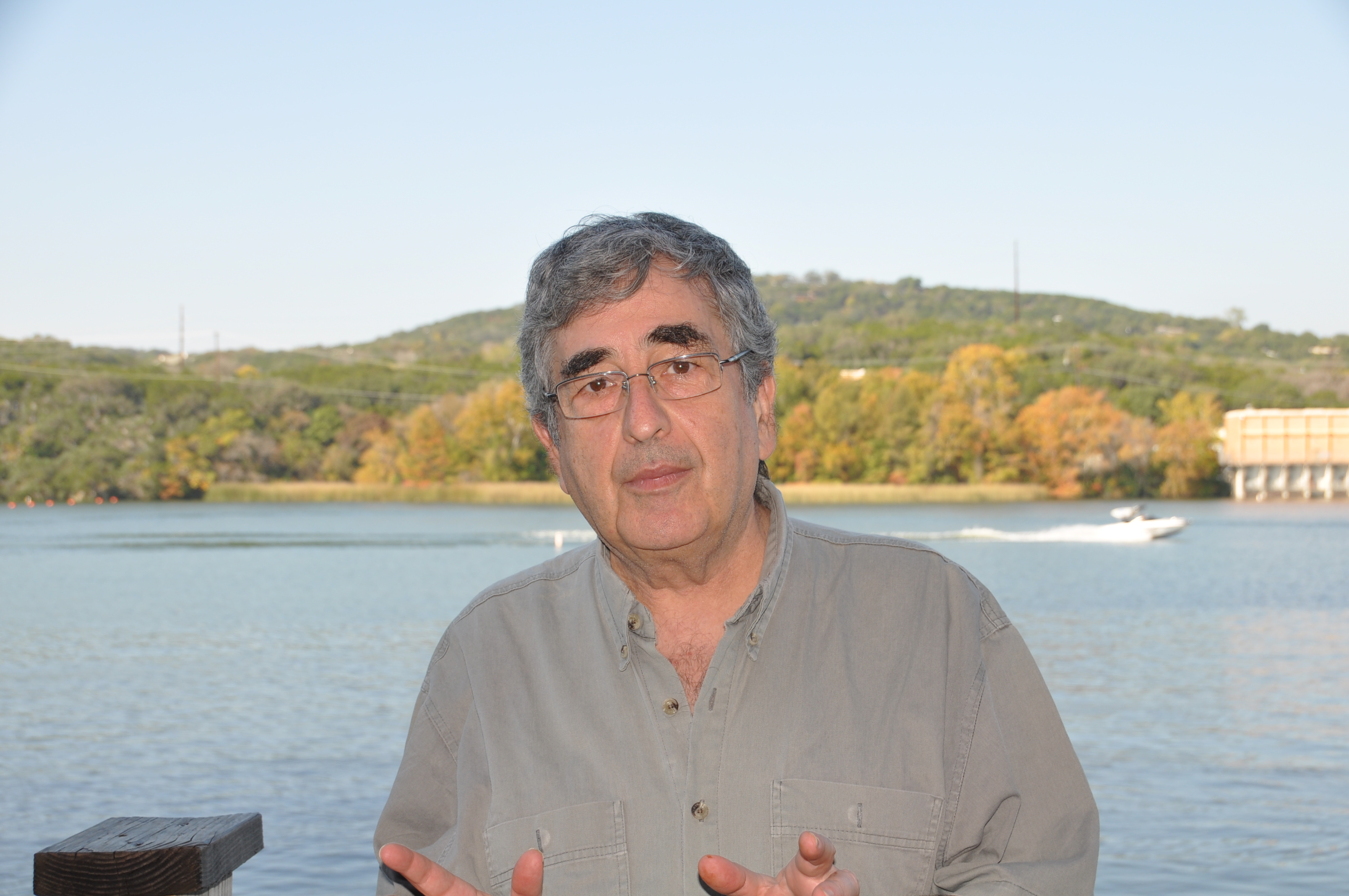
- Born: February 9, 1945 (age 81); Jerusalem
- Occupation: novelist
- Writing career
- Language: Hebrew
- Period: 1963-Today
- Notable works: Feathers; The Pure Element of Time
- Notable awards: Bernstein Prize (1980); Bialik Prize (2002); Prime Minister's Prize for Hebrew Literary Works (2013); The Agnon Prize for the Art of Prose (2017)

Haim Be'er (Hebrew: חיים באר; b. 9 February 1945) is an Israeli novelist.

== Biography ==
Haim Rachlevsky (Be'er) was born in Jerusalem to an Orthodox Jewish family. He grew up in the Geula neighborhood and attended Ma'aleh, a state religious high school. From 1963 to 1965 he served in the Israel Defense Forces in the army rabbinate, writing for the army newspaper Mahanayim. Concurrently, he worked nights as a copy editor at the daily newspaper Davar.

In 1966, he began working at the Am Oved publishing house, first as a copyeditor and later as an editor and member of the editorial board. All his books have been published by Am Oved. For ten years, he wrote a weekly column called "Memoirs of a Bookworm" (Mi-zikhronoteha shel tolaat sefarim).

Be'er teaches Hebrew literature at Ben-Gurion University of the Negev.

Be'er's latest novel, El Makom Sheharuakh Holekh ("Back from Heavenly Lake"; 2010), was inspired by a trek to Nepal and Tibet. Dedicated to the classic Yiddish writer Mendele Mocher Sforim, it is a mystical tale about a Hasidic rebbe from Bnei Brak who travels to Tibet.

== Published works ==
- Sha'ashu'ei Yom Yom (Day to Day Delights, poems, 1970).
- Feathers (in English translation, 2004), originally Notzot (1979).
- Et ha-Zamir (The Time of Trimming, 1987).
- Gam Ahavatam Gam Sinatam - Bialik, Brenner, Agnon Ma`arakhot Yahasim (Their Love and Their Hate: Bialik, Brenner, Agnon, Relationships, biography, 1993).
- The Pure Element of Time (in English translation, 2003), originally Havalim (1998).
- Lifnei Hamakom ("Upon a Certain Place") (2007).
- El Makom Sheharuah Holekh ("To Where the Wind Goes") (2010).
- Halomoteihem he-Hadashim ("Their new dreams") (2014).
- Be-Hazara me-Emek Refa'im ("Back from Emek Refa'im") (2018).
- Masa Dilugim ("Skipping trip") (2019).
- Tzel yado ("The shadow of his hand") (2021).

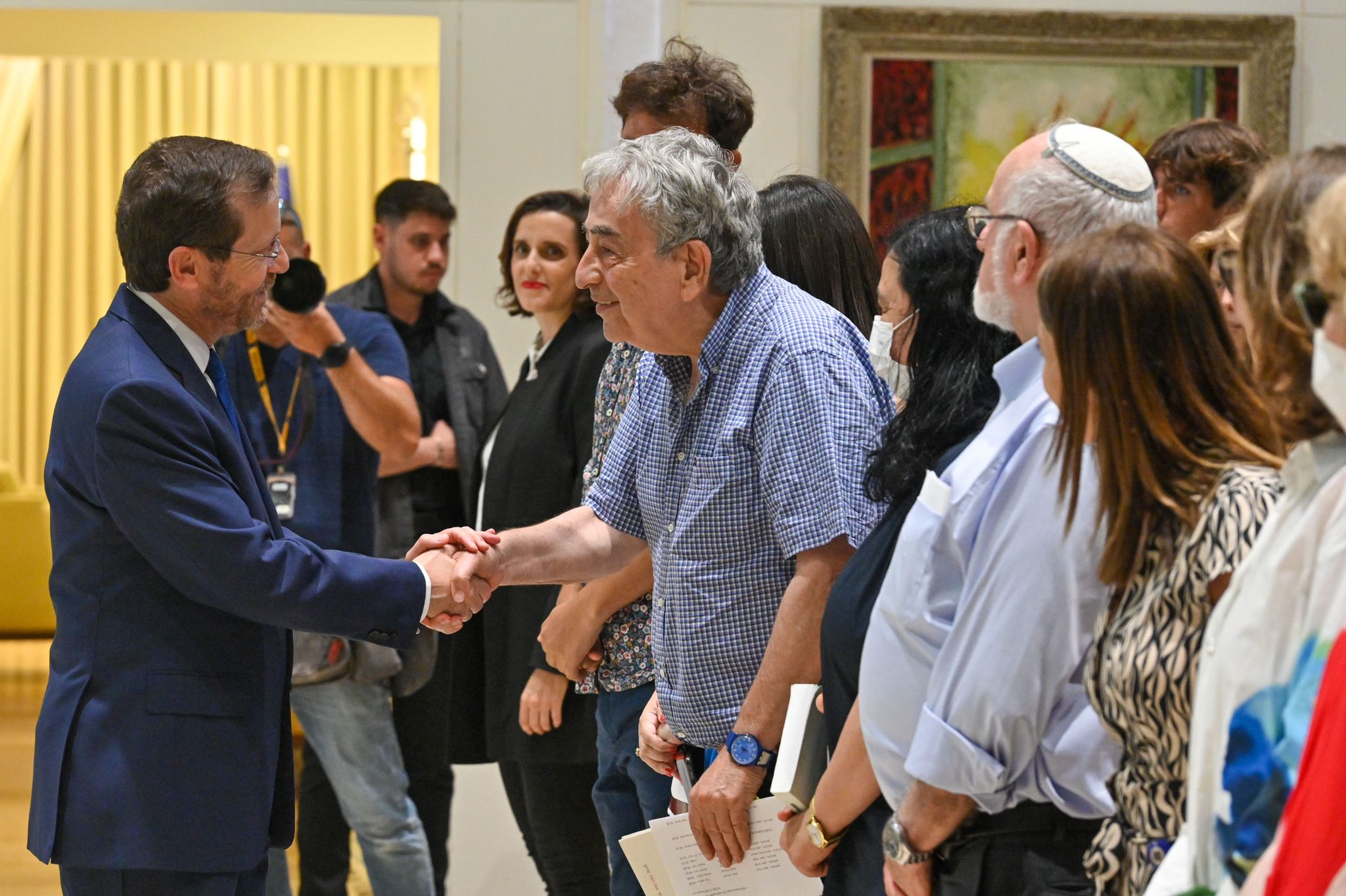
President Isaac Herzog at a meeting with Haim Be'er, June 2022.

== Awards (selection) ==
- Bernstein Prize, original Hebrew novel category (1980).
- Kugel Prize for literature, awarded by the Municipality of Holon (2000).
- Bialik Prize for literature, jointly with Maya Bejerano, Yoel Hoffman and Miriam Rut (2002).
- Prime Minister's Prize for Hebrew Literary Works, for poetry (2013).
- The Ramat Gan Prize for Literature in the field of prose, for his book El Makom SheHaRuach Holekh (2013).
- The Agnon Prize for the Art of Prose (2017).
- Honorary Doctorate from the Hebrew University of Jerusalem (2022).

== See also ==
- List of Bialik Prize recipients
