= Serri =

Serri may refer to:

== People ==
- Bracha Serri (1940–2013), Israeli poet
- Eddy Serri (born 1974), Italian cyclist
- Rino Serri (1933–2006), Italian politician
- Serri (singer), South Korean singer, member of girl group Dal Shabet

== Places ==
- Serri, Sardinia, Italy

== Other ==
- Serri, one of the dialects of the Lule Sami language spoken in Norway and Sweden
