= Sorek =

Sorek may refer to:

== Places ==
- Sorek, Nepal
- Nahal Sorek, a river and drainage basin in Israel
- Soreq Nuclear Research Center, Israeli research and development institute

== People ==
- Adi Sorek (born 1970), Israeli writer
- Rotem Sorek (born 1975), Israeli scientist
- Zehorit Sorek (born 1975), Israeli LGBTQ rights activist
- Murder of Dvir Sorek, 2019
- Murders of Neta Sorek and Kristine Luken, 2010
