= Alex Epstein =

Alex Epstein may refer to:

- Alex Epstein (American writer) (born 1980), American energy theorist
- Alex Epstein (Israeli writer) (born 1971) Russian-born Israeli writer, known for his micro stories
- Alex Epstein (screenwriter), (born 1963), American/Canadian screenwriter (TV, film and video games) and book author
