= Tamar Gelbetz =

Israeli writer (1957–2022)

- תמר גלבץ
- Born: September 30, 1957
- Died: November 29, 2022 (aged 65); Tel Aviv, Israel
- Education: University of Haifa; Tel Aviv University
- Occupations: Journalist; Novelist
- Writing career
- Notable awards: Prime Minister's Prize for Hebrew Literary Works

Tamar Gelbetz (Hebrew: תמר גלבץ; September 30, 1957 – November 29, 2022) was an Israeli writer and journalist. She won the 2008 Prime Minister's Prize for Hebrew Literary Works.

== Biography ==
Tamar Gelbetz studied at University of Haifa, and Tel Aviv University.

== Literary career ==
Gelbetz was the film critic for the Haaretz supplement. She was a senior editor at Maariv. She was one of the founders of the Maariv culture supplement and served as the newspaper's television critic. In the mid-1990s, she wrote for the "Florentine " television series, and was the editor of Gal Uchovsky's "Small Circle" culture program on Channel 2.

In 1994, her essay "We are all ants in a convoy" appeared in People Died of Fear, a collection of essays about Israel in the Gulf War. In 2004, her story "Peas" was selected for Haaretz's short story contest.

In 2004, she published her first novel, At betkufa tova. In 2006, she published Mekupelet, which was nominated for the Sapir Prize.

== Published works ==
- את בתקופה טובה (You're Doing Fine) 2004 ISBN 9789657120354
- מקופלת (Chocolate Bar), 2006
- המתים והחיים מאוד (The Dead and the Very Much Alive) (2013) ISBN 9789651323010
- האחרון (The Last One) (2023) - published after her death.

=== English ===
- Dome, illustrator Gil Marco Shani, Revolver; 2006. ISBN 9783865882936

== See also ==
- Hebrew literature
- Journalism in Israel
