= Lea Aini =

Israeli author and poet

- לאה איני
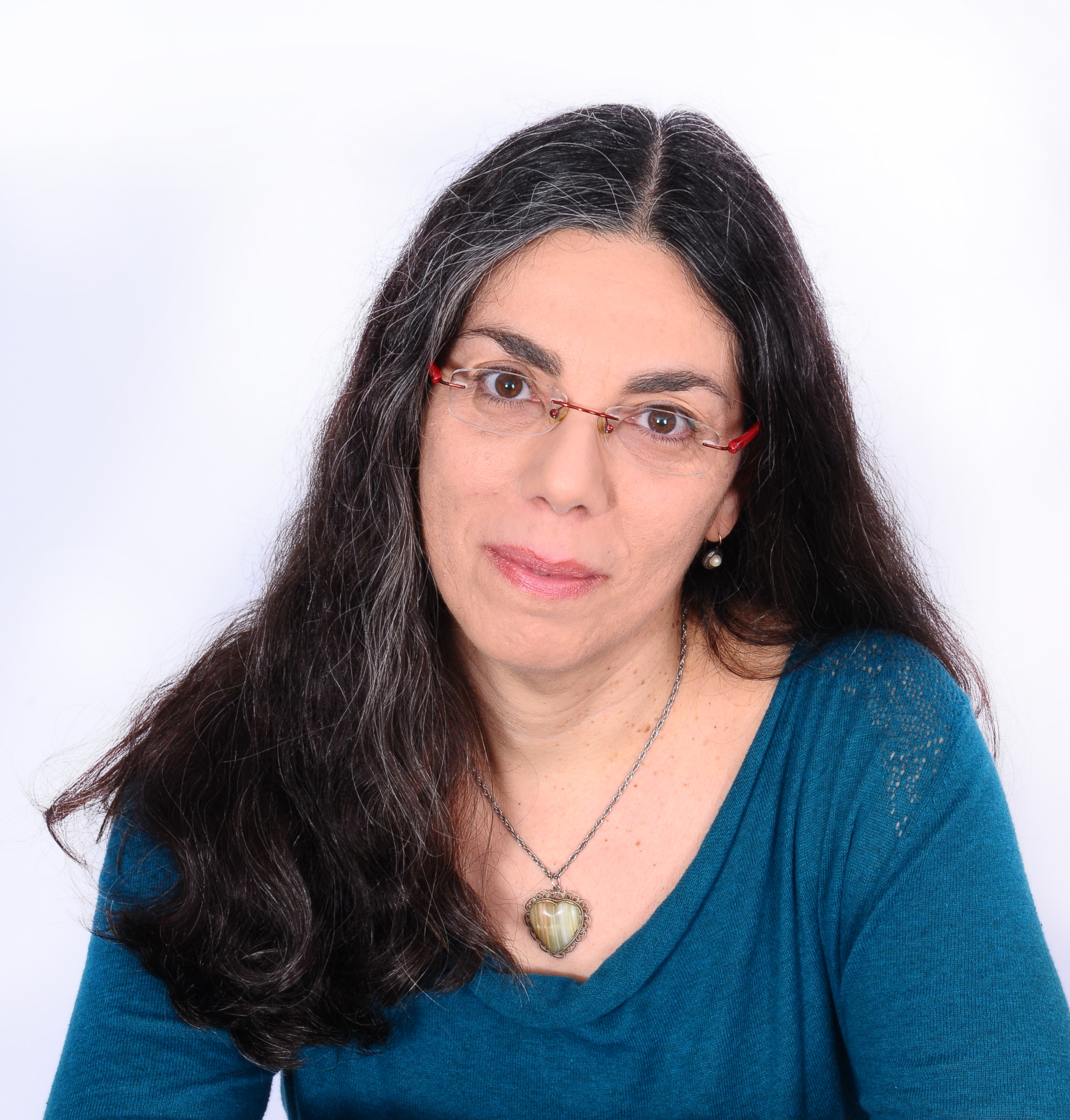
- Lea Aini
- Born: 1962 (age 63–64); Tel Aviv, Israel
- Occupations: Author, poet
- Notable work: The Rose of Lebanon
- Awards: Wertheim Prize for Poetry (1988), Adler Prize for Poetry (1988), Prime Minister's award for Hebrew Literature (1993, 2003), Tel Aviv Foundation Award (1994), Bernstein Prize (2006), Bialik Prize (2010)

Lea Aini (Hebrew: לאה איני; born 1962 Tel Aviv), is an Israeli author and poet, who has written over twenty books.

Her 2009 novel The Rose of Lebanon, her eighth prose book, deals with the stories that a female soldier volunteer tells about her childhood as the daughter of a Holocaust survivor from Saloniki.

== Awards ==
- In 1988, Eini won the Wertheim Prize for Poetry and the Adler Prize for Poetry.
- In 1993, she was awarded the Prime Minister's award for Hebrew Literature, which she received again in 2003.
- In 1994, she received the Tel Aviv Foundation Award.
- In 2006, she received the Bernstein Prize (original Hebrew language play category).
- In 2010, she was awarded the Bialik Prize for literature, (jointly with Shlomit Cohen-Assif and Mordechai Geldman).

== Books published in Hebrew ==
=== Poetry ===
- Diokan ("Portrait"), Hakibbutz Hameuchad, 1988
- Keisarit Ha-Pirion Ha-Medumeh ("The Empress of Imagined Fertility"), Hakibbutz Hameuchad/Siman Kriah, 1991

=== Short fiction ===
- Giborei Kayits ("The Sea Horse Race" - stories & novella), Hakibbutz Hameuchad/Siman Kriah, 1991
- Hardufim, O Sipurim Mur`alim Al Ahava ("Oleanders or Poisoned Love Stories" - stories) Zmora Bitan, 1997
- Sdommel (novella & two stories), Hakibbutz Hameuchad/Siman Kriah, 2001

=== Novels ===
- Geut Ha-Hol ("Sand Tide"), Hakibbutz Hameuchad/Siman Kriah, 1992
- Mishehi Tzricha Lihiot Kan ("Someone Must Be Here"), Hakibbutz Hameuchad/Siman Kriah, 1995
- Ashtoret ("Astarte"), Zmora Bitan, 1999
- Anak, Malka ve-Aman Hamiskhakim ("Giant, Queen, and the Master of Games"), Hakibbutz Hameuchad, 2004
- Vered Ha-Levanon ("Rose of Lebanon"), Kinneret, Zmora-Bitan, 2009
- Susit ("Horsey"), Kinneret, Zmora-Bitan, 2012
- Bat ha-Makom ("The Native" - novel & novella), Kinneret, Zmora-Bitan, 2014

=== Youth titles ===
- Tikrah Li Mi-Lemata ("Call Me from Downstairs"), Hakibbutz Hameuchad, 1994
- Hei, Yuli ("Hi, Yuli"), Hakibbutz Hameuchad, 1995

=== Children's titles ===
- Mar Arnav Mehapes Avoda ("Mr. Rabbit's Job Hunt"), Am Oved, 1994
- Hetzi Ve-Ananas: Tamnunina ("Half-Pint and Wandercloud: Octopina"), Hakibbutz Hameuchad, 1996
- Shir Ani, Shir Eema ("One Song Me, One Song Mummy"), Hakibbutz Hameuchad, 2000
- Kuku Petrozilia ("Parsley Ponytail"), Kinneret, 2002

== See also ==
- List of Bialik Prize recipients
