= Orly Castel-Bloom =

Israeli author

- אורלי קסטל-בלום
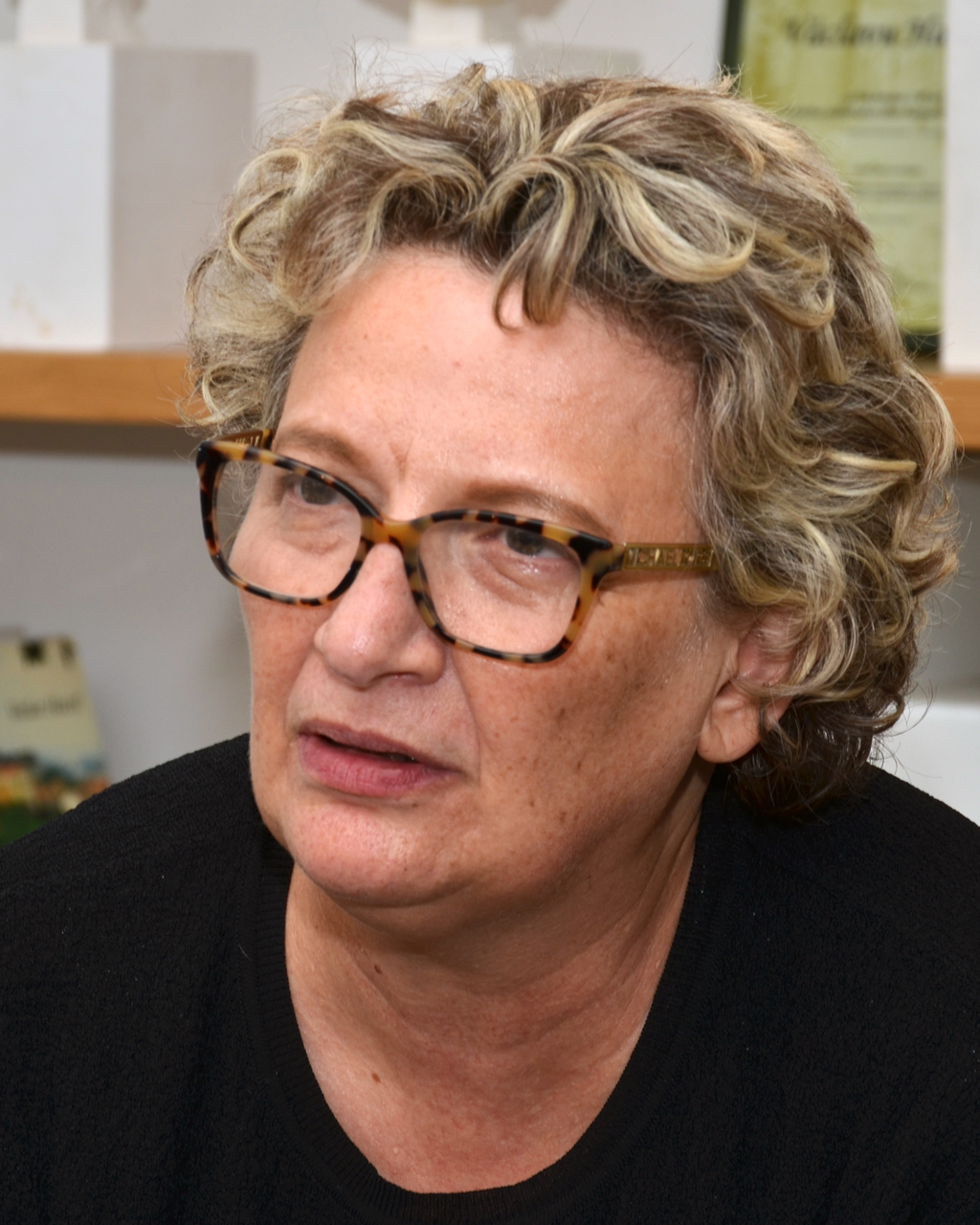
- Orly Castel-Bloom (2017)
- Born: 1960 (age 65–66); Tel Aviv, Israel
- Education: Tel Aviv University, Beit Zvi School for the Performing Arts
- Occupations: Author, Lecturer
- Children: 2
- Writing career
- Language: Hebrew, French
- Notable works: Dolly City, Free Radicals, Human Parts
- Notable awards: Prime Minister's Award, Tel Aviv Award for Fiction

Orly Castel-Bloom (Hebrew: אורלי קסטל-בלום; born 1960, Tel Aviv) is an Israeli author.

== Biography ==
Orly Castel-Bloom was born in Northern Tel Aviv in 1960, to a family of French-speaking Egyptian Jews. Until the age of three, she had French nannies and spoke only French. She studied film at Tel Aviv University and theater at the Beit Zvi School for the Performing Arts in Ramat Gan.

Castel-Bloom lives in Tel Aviv and has two children. She has lectured at the universities of Harvard, UCLA, Cambridge and Oxford and currently teaches creative writing at Tel Aviv University.

== Literary career ==
Castel-Bloom's first collection of short stories, Not Far from the Center of Town (Lo Rahok mi-Merkhaz ha-Ir), was published in 1987 by Am Oved. She is the author of 11 books, including collections of short fiction and novels. Her 1992 novel Dolly City, has been included in the UNESCO Collection of Representative Works, and in 1999 she was named one of the fifty most influential women in Israel. Dolly City has been performed as a play in Tel Aviv.

In Free Radicals (Radikalim Hofshiyim) published in 2000, Castel-Bloom stopped writing in the first-person. In Human Parts (Halakim Enoshiyim) published in 2002, she was the first Israeli novelist to address the subject of Palestinian suicide bombings. Her anthology of short stories You Don't Argue with Rice (stories from 1987 to 2004), was published in 2004. Castel-Bloom has won the Prime Minister's award twice, the Tel Aviv award for fiction and was nominated for the Sapir Prize for Literature.

Israeli literary critic Gershon Shaked called her a postmodern writer who "communicates the despair of a generation which no longer even dreams the dreams of Zionist history."

== Bibliography ==
=== Novels ===
- Heykan ʾaniy nimṣeʾt (1990). Where I Am
- Doliy siyṭiy (1992). Dolly City, trans. Dalya Bilu (Loki Books, 1997; Dalkey Archive, 2010)
- HaMiynah Liyzah (1995). Mina Lisa
- Ha-Sefer he-hadash (1998). Taking the Trend
- Ḥalaqiym ʾenwṣiyyim (2002). Human Parts, trans. Dalya Bilu (Godine, 2003)
- Teqsṭiyl (2006). Textile, trans. Dalya Bilu (The Feminist Press, 2013)
- HaRoman HaMistri (2015). An Egyptian Novel, trans. Todd Hasak-Lowy (Dalkey Archive, 2017)

=== Short story collections ===
- Lo Rahok mi-Merkhaz ha-Ir (1987). Not Far from the Center of Town
- Sevivah 'oyenet (1989). Hostile Surroundings
- Sipurim bilti-retsoniyim (1993). Unbidden Stories
- Radikalem hofshi'im (2000). Free Radicals
- Im orez lo mitvakchim (2004). You Don't Argue with Rice

== Awards and honors ==
Castel-Bloom won the Prime Minister's Prize for Hebrew Literary Works in both 2001 and 2011, and the prestigious Sapir Prize for Literature for An Egyptian Novel in 2015.

== See also ==
- Israeli literature
- Women of Israel

== Relevant literature ==
- Shiffman, Smadar. "Orly Castel-Bloom and Yoel Hoffmann: On Israeli Postmodern Prose Fiction." Hebrew Studies 50, no. 1 (2009): 215-227.
