= Miriam Akavia =

Polish-born Israeli writer, translator and Holocaust survivor (1927–2015)

- מרים עקביה
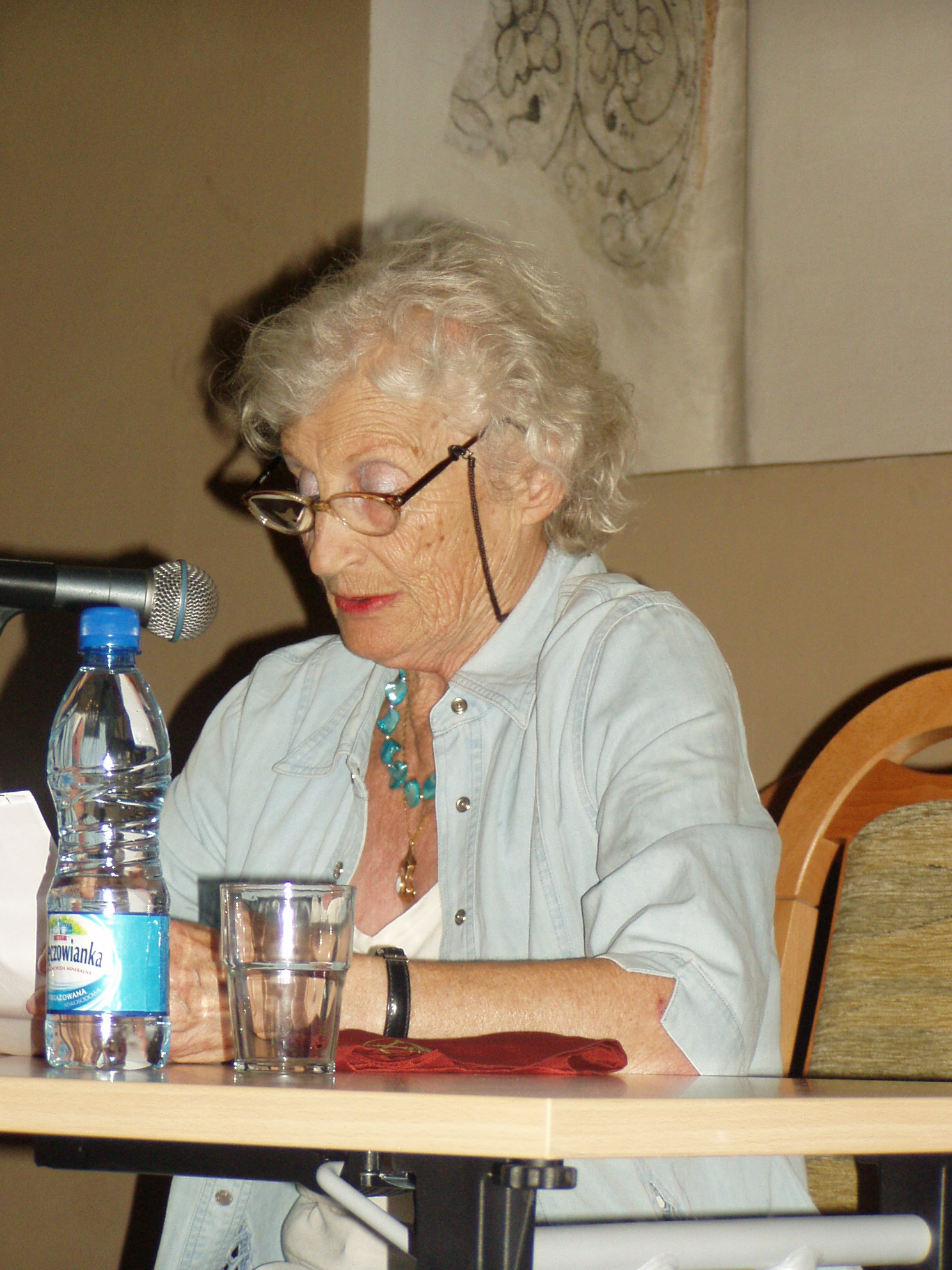
- Born: Matylda Weinfeld; 20 November 1927; Kraków, Poland
- Died: 16 January 2015 (aged 87)
- Education: Tel Aviv University
- Occupations: Writer, Translator, Holocaust Survivor
- Known for: Holocaust memoirs and novels
- Awards: Yad Vashem Prize (1978), Prime Minister's Prize for Hebrew Literary Works (1993)

Miriam Akavia also Matylda Weinfeld (Hebrew: מרים עקביה; 20 November 1927 – 16 January 2015) was a Polish-born Israeli writer and translator, a Holocaust survivor, and the president of the Platform for Jewish-Polish Dialogue.

== Early life and education ==
She was born in 1927 in Kraków to the Weinfeld family. During World War II she was interned in the Kraków Ghetto, and then an inmate of the Kraków-Płaszów concentration camp, Auschwitz concentration camp and finally the Bergen-Belsen concentration camp.

== Career ==
After the latter camp's liberation by the British army, she was among the ailing women inmates evacuated by the Swedish Red Cross for convalescence in Sweden. In 1946 she found her way to Mandatory Palestine. She qualified as a registered nurse, and studied literature and history at Tel Aviv University. She also served as a cultural attaché in Israeli diplomatic posts located in Budapest and Stockholm. Miriam Akavia was one of the three students who were stopped from attending public schools as a result of German Invasion; however, she was transferred to the Jewish Gymnazjum.

Miriam Akavia began publishing novels and memoirs in 1975. As a president of the Platform for Jewish-Polish Dialogue, she organized meetings with teenagers of both countries. She aimed to defuse stereotypes which separate Poles and Jews.

== Writing ==
Miriam Akavia wrote mainly about her childhood, the Holocaust and her war experiences. She was also a translator who translated Hebrew literature into Polish and vice versa.

She was a laureate of many honours in Poland, Israel and Germany. In 1978 she received a Yad Vashem Prize. Her books have been translated into many languages, including English, German, Danish, and French. In 1993, she received the Prime Minister's Prize for Hebrew Literary Works.

== Bibliography ==
=== In English translation ===
- An End to Childhood (1995) Essex: Vallentine Mitchell
- My Own Vineyard (2006) London: Vallentine Mitchell
