= Amalia Kahana-Carmon =

Israeli writer and literary critic (1926–2019)

- עמליה כהנא-כרמון
- Born: 18 October 1926; Ein Harod, Palestine
- Died: 16 January 2019 (aged 92); Tel Aviv, Israel
- Education: Herzliya Hebrew Gymnasium Hebrew University in Jerusalem
- Occupations: Author, literary critic

Amalia Kahana-Carmon (Hebrew: עמליה כהנא-כרמון; 18 October 1926 – 16 January 2019) was an Israeli author and literary critic. She was awarded the Israel Prize for literature in 2000.

== Biography ==
Amalia Kahana-Carmon was born in Kibbutz Ein Harod on 18 October 1926. She moved to Tel Aviv as a child and studied at Herzliya Hebrew Gymnasium, but her studies were interrupted by the 1948 Palestine war where she served in the Negev Brigade of Palmach as a signals operator and wrote the famous telegram for the capture of Eilat. Upon her return from military service, Kahana-Carmon attended the Hebrew University in Jerusalem and studied library science and philology. Soon after graduating, she moved to Switzerland (1951 to 1955) and then to England (1955 to 1957) before moving back to Tel Aviv to work as a librarian and writer.

== Family ==
Kahana-Carmon’s father, Chaim Kahana (1890-1910), immigrated to Palestine in 1910. In Palestine, he received a rabbinical education and both invented and held consultations for technical mechanisms. Her mother, Sara Crispin (1903-1985), was born in Bulgaria and attended the Hebrew Teachers Seminary in Bulgaria before immigrating to Palestine in 1922 where she studied bee-keeping at the Mikveh Israel Agricultural School. Crispin spent the rest of her life as a bee-keeper and Hebrew teacher. Kahana-Carmon had one younger sister named Miriam (b. 1929). While Kahana-Carmon was in London in 1951, she met and married an Israeli student named Arie Carmon, who studied civil engineering. They had three children together–Raya (b. 1953), Iddo (b. 1956), and Haggai (b. 1959)–before divorcing in 1978.

== Life as a writer ==
Kahana-Carmon began writing in the 1950s but is not considered to be part of the Palmah Generation, a movement that dominated the literary scene in the 1940s and 1950s, nor the Generation of Statehood, a counter-movement to the Palmah Generation. Her writing differed from these groups in an important way: it centered around the individual rather than national ideals. This does not mean that Kahana-Carmon was not influenced by others; in fact, her writing was shaped by Nehamah Pukhachewsky (1869-1934), who wrote about the struggles of women pioneers in Palestine, and Devorah Baron (1886-1956), who wrote about the victimization of women in male-dominated religious Jewish institutions. Many also believe that Kahana-Carmon’s writing was influenced by Virginia Woolf because of their shared lyrical, poetic style, but Kahana-Carmon commented that this relation was due to similarity in thought rather than any influence.

During Kahana-Carmon’s time, authors who explored national ideals, usually represented by men's lives, were valued over those who focused on the individual or women’s experiences. Typically when women were mentioned, they were used as metaphors for the land of Israel. Consequently, women’s writing, which more often than not centered around women’s experiences, was pushed to the periphery. Kahana-Carmon’s writing was no exception to this. That being said, Kahana-Carmon believed that all writers were outsiders, not because of social rejection but because others were incapable of understanding their commitment to their crafts.

Many have tried to translate Kahana-Carmon’s writing, but she rejected their attempts, believing that her work was untranslatable. There are still a few translations that do exist, including With Her on Her Way Home, translated into Italian and Chinese, and Bridal Veil, in G. Abramson’s (ed.) Oxford Book of Hebrew Short Stories (1996) and R. Domb’s (ed.) New Women’s Writing from Israel (1996).

== Literary style and themes ==
Kahana-Carmon writes about the lives of traditional women in male-dominated environments before marriage, during war, or during university years using a lyrical style that explores the depths of her characters’ emotions. Most of Kahana-Carmon’s writing focuses on one mundane event, and the descriptions are a reflection on that event, allowing the reader to peer into the inner world of the characters. Generally, this reflection does not lead to a solution, but the characters experience freedom from understanding their situations.

Many of Kahana-Carmon’s characters experience romantic feelings, but often the object of these emotions is in a different social circle or the characters are in the wrong place at the wrong time, so they cannot be together. Despite their romantic defeats, her heroines emerge as queens who recognize what they have lost but continue to have hope. She challenges the happily-ever-after paradigm but still believes in the dignifying aspects of love.

Furthermore, Kahana-Carmon’s characters are outsiders in their societies because of their genders, classes, or races. Some of them even cross gender and race boundaries, such as in Up in Montifer. In this novella, Clara, the heroine, has a black, freed slave as her companion. She reaches independence as a merchant through dialogue with this freed slave, where both characters are gender and race conscious.

Kahana-Carmon also wrote feminist critiques of Israeli literature and culture. These essays were inspired by a trip to America where she attended an international meeting for writers and was introduced to Frantz Fanon (1925-1961), who wrote postcolonial criticisms about race relations. She was also inspired by gender critiques from Simone de Beauvoir (1908-1986).

== Awards ==
- In 1971, and again in 1980, Kahana-Carmon was awarded the Prime Minister's Prize for Hebrew Literary Works.
- In 1985, Kahana-Carmon was awarded the Brenner Prize for literature. She was the first woman Hebrew fiction writer to receive this award.
- In 1993, she received the Bialik Prize for Hebrew-language literature.
- In 1995, Kahana-Carmon received the Newman Prize.
- In 1995, Kahana-Carmon received the ACUM Prize.
- In 1997, Kahana-Carmon received the President’s Prize.
- In 2000, she was awarded the Israel Prize, for original Hebrew literature.

== Published works ==
- Under One Roof (1966)
- And Moon in the Valley of Ayalon (1971)
- A Piece for the Stage, in the Grand Manner (1975)
- Magnetic Fields (1977)
- High Stakes (1980)
- Up in Montifer (1984)
- With Her on Her Way Home (1991)
- Here We'll Live (1996)

== See also ==
- Hebrew literature
- List of Israel Prize recipients
