= Yehudit Hendel =

Israeli author (1921–2014)

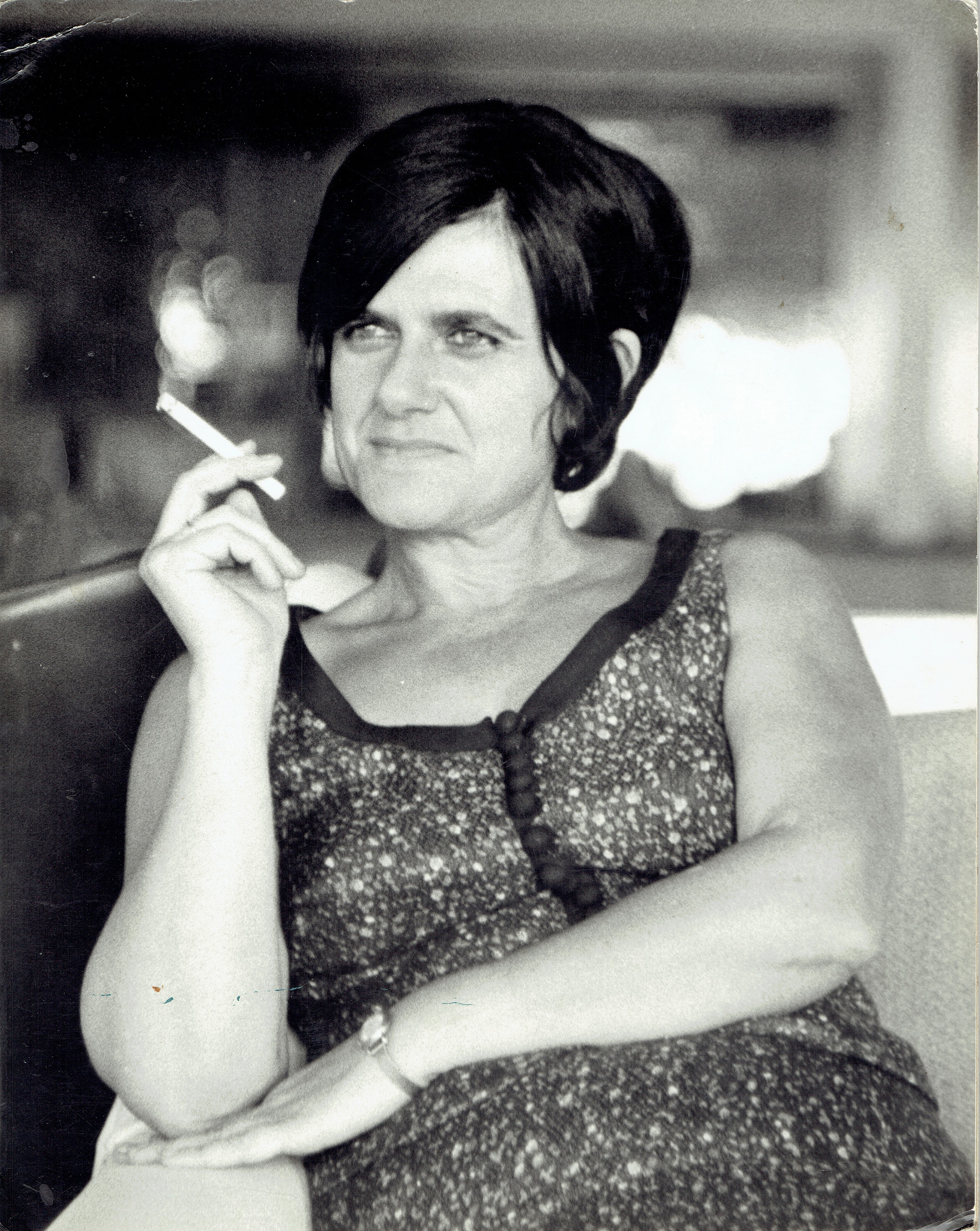
- Yehudit Hendel in the 1960s
- Native name: יהודית הנדל
- Born: October 25, 1921 Warsaw
- Died: May 23, 2014 (aged 92) Tel Aviv
- Spouse: Zvi Meirovitz
- Children: Dorit (b. 1952), Yehoshua (b. 1963)

Yehudit Hendel (English: Judith Hendel; German: Jehudit Hendel; Hebrew: יהודית הנדל) was an award-winning Israeli author. She wrote novels, short stories, and non-fiction.

Much of her work focuses on the Holocaust, displaced persons, people with depression, and the terminally ill.

When she won the Israel Prize in 2003, the selection committee stated that "she is a unique, moving, powerful voice with psychological depth. She delves into man's soul and into the everyday existential problems with delicate observations, and out of recognition of people's tragic fates. Yehudit Hendel is a pioneer in turning from the center of the social map to its edges."

== Biography ==
Hendel was born in 1921 in Warsaw. The same year, her grandfather moved to Palestine; her parents and family moved to Haifa in 1930. Her father, Akiva, took a job as a bus driver.

As a child, Hendel was a member of the HaNoar HaOved VeHaLomed, a Zionist youth movement. She attended the teacher's college in Tel Aviv, and in 1948 she married the painter Zvi Meirovitz. They had two children, Dorit (b. 1952) and Yehoshua (b. 1963). In 1980, Hendel moved to Tel Aviv, where she lived for the rest of her life.

== Literary work ==
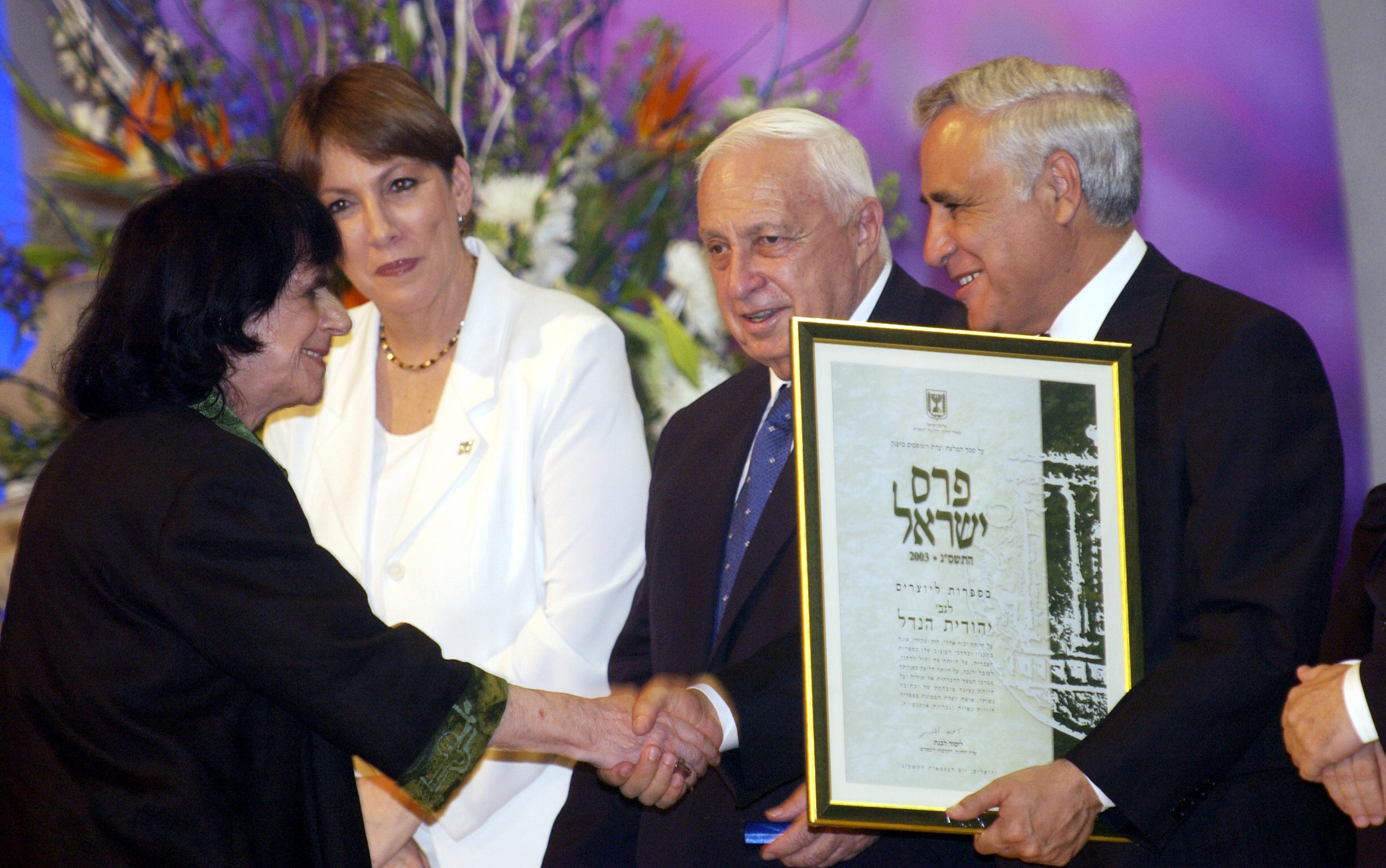
Hendel receiving Israel prize award in 2003

Hendel's first short story, "Bi-khvot Orot" ("At lights-out"), was published in 1942 when she was seventeen years old. Her first collection of short stories, Anashim Aherim Hem (They are different), was published in 1950. In 1954, the manuscript for her novel Rehov ha-Madregot (Street of steps) won the Asher Barash Competition. It was published in 1955 and became a bestseller. This was followed by the publication of a second novel, He-Hazer shel Momo ha-Gedolah (The courtyard of Momo the Great) in 1969. She was working on a third novel, to be titled Zelilah Hozeret (Repeat dive), in 1970 when her husband became ill and the book was set aside; her husband died in 1974. She never finished the book, but it formed the basis of a film of the same title directed by Shimon Dotan in 1982. In 1984, she published Ha-Koah ha-Aher The other force), a biography of her late husband Zvi Meirovitz.

The 1980s and 1990s were a prolific period for her work. She wrote several more novels and short stories, as well as literary reviews. In 1985, she hosted a radio program on Voice of Israel radio.

== Publications ==
=== English translations ===
==== As primary author ====
- The Street of Steps (1963)
- Kesef Katan: A Collection of Stories (1988)
- Small Change: A Collection of Stories (2002)

==== As contributor ====
- Ribcage: Israeli Women's Fiction (1994)
- The Oxford Book of Hebrew Short Stories (1996)
- Six Israeli Novellas (1998)
- Children of Israel, Children of Palestine: Our Own True Stories (1998)
- Dreaming the Actual: Contemporary Fiction and Poetry by Israeli Women Writers (2000)

=== Hebrew ===
- “Bi-khvot Orot” (At lights-out, 1942) [short story]
- Twenty+ short stories (1944-1949) in Mi-Bifnim, Davar, Sh’naton Davar, Mishmar, Le-Ahdut ha-Avodah, Haaretz, Molad, and Keshet Sofrim.
- La-Magen: Pirkei Shirah (Poems for the defender, 1948) [poems]
- Anashim Aherim Hem (They are different, 1950) [short stories]
- Rehov ha-Madregot (Street of steps, 1954) [novel]
- He-Hazer shel Momo ha-Gedolah (The courtyard of Momo the Great, 1969) [novel] -- reprinted in 1993 as Ha-Hamsin ha-Aharon (The last sirocco)
- Zelilah Hozeret (Repeat dive, 1982) [screenplay by Shimon Dotan, based on novel by Hendel]
- Ha-Koah ha-Aher (The other force, 1984) [biography]
- Le-Yad Kefarim Shketim: Shneym-Asar Yamim be-Polin (Near quiet places: twelve days in Poland, 1987)
- Kesef Katan: Mahzor Sippurim (Small change: a cycle of stories, 1988) [short stories]
- Har ha-To’im (The mountain of losses, 1991)
- Aruhat Boker Temimah: Mahazor Sippurim (An innocent breakfast: a cycle of stories, 1996)
- Rehov ha-Madregot (1998)
- reprinting of Anashim Aherim Hem (They are different), including the previously censored short story “Kever Banim” (The sons’ grave), 2000
- Terufo shel Rofe ha-Nefesh (Crack-up, 2002)

== Awards ==
Hendel was the recipient of many recognitions for her work, including:

- Asher Barash Competition (1954), for Rehov ha-Madregot (Street of steps)
- ACUM (Israel Association of Composers and Publishers) award (1976)
- Agnon Prize (1989)
- Newman Prize for Hebrew Literature (1995)
- Bialik Prize for Literature (1996)
- Prime Minister's Prize (1975, 1998)
- Israel Prize for Lifetime Achievement (2003)
