= Mira Magen =

Israeli author (born 1950)

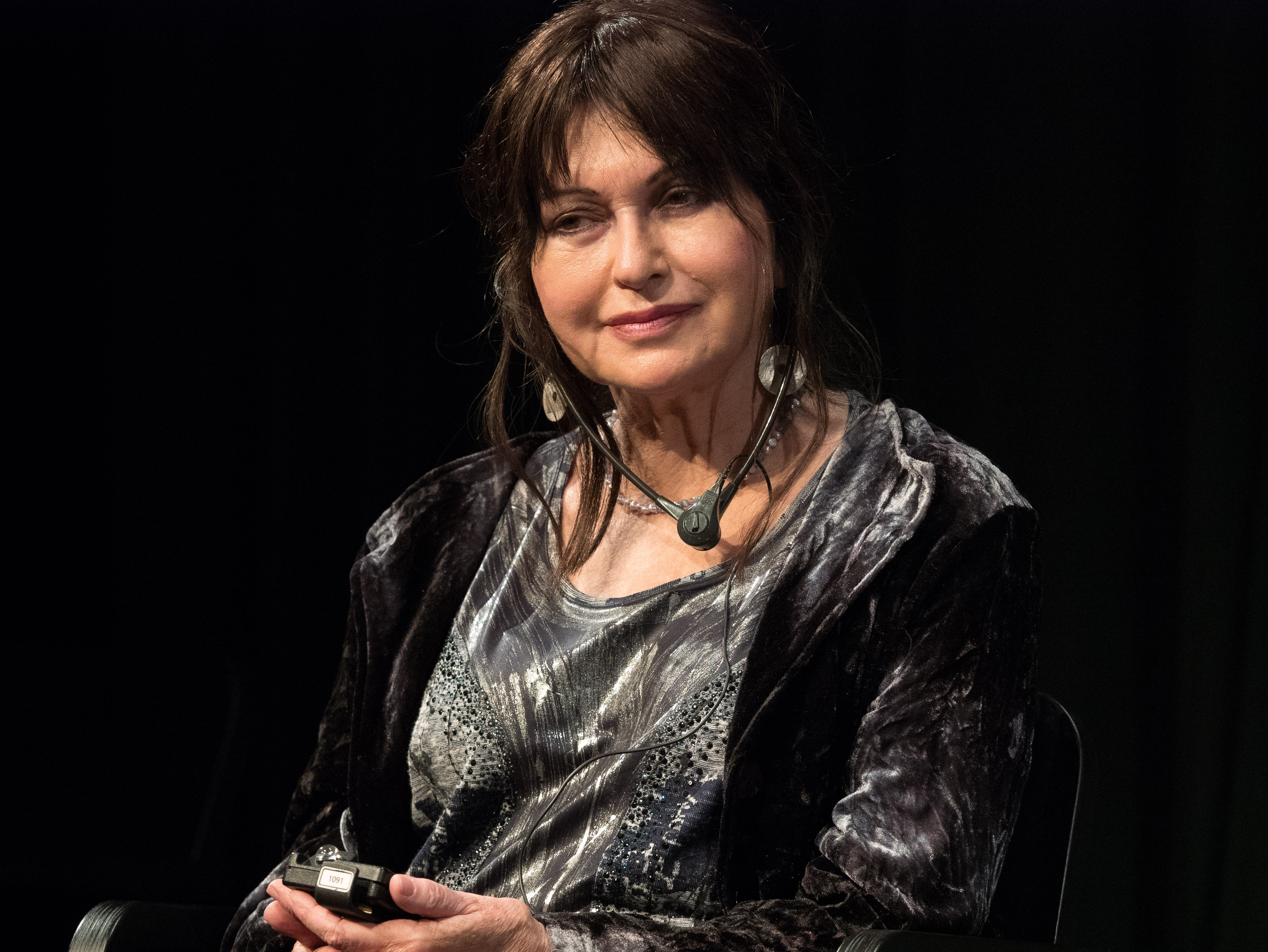
- Mira Magen, 2018
- Native name: מירה מגן
- Born: 1950 (age 75–76) Kfar Saba, Israel
- Occupation: novelist
- Language: Hebrew
- Notable awards: Prime Minister's Prize for Hebrew Literary Works (2005)

Mira Magen (Hebrew: מירה מגן; born 1950) is an Israeli author writing in Hebrew. Her books have been translated into German, French and Italian.

== Biography ==
Magen was born in Kfar Saba, Israel to an orthodox Jewish family.

She served in Nahal, Israel Defense Forces, and there she met her husband, Shayke Magen.

She worked as a teacher for a couple of years. She studied psychology and sociology in Ben-Gurion University of the Negev. Worked some years at Bituah Leumi - Israel's national social security agency. Afterwards, she learned nursing and worked as a nurse in Hadassah Medical Center in Mount Scopus, Jerusalem. In the early 1990s, while still working as a nurse, she began writing short stories.

Her first book, Well Buttoned-Up - a collection of her short stories, was published in 1994. The book was translated from Hebrew to German in 1997. In 1998, she won the Olschwung Foundation Award for this book.

Her second book, Do Not Strike the Wall, was published in Hebrew in 1997, and a translation to German was published in 2001.

Her third book, Love, After All, was published in Hebrew in 2000, and translated to German in 2004.

Her fourth book, Brother and Sister, was published in Hebrew in 2000.

Her fifth book, Her Angels Have All Fallen Asleep, was published in Hebrew in 2003, and translated to German in 2006.

In 2005 she was awarded the Israeli Prime Minister's Prize.

Her sixth book, The Glass Butterfly, was published in 2005 in Hebrew, in 2007 in German and in 2008 in French.

Her seventh book, Time Will Tell, was published in 2008 in Hebrew, in 2010 in German and French and in 2015 in Italian.

Her eighth book, Vodka and Bread, was published in Hebrew in 2010, and in German in 2012.

Her ninth book, The Bluest Eyes, was published in Hebrew in 2012, and in German in 2017.

Her tenth book, The Carpenter's Sister, was published in 2015 in Hebrew, in 2017 in French and in 2018 in German.

Her eleventh book, Michaela, was published in 2018 in Hebrew.
