= Esther Raab =

Israeli poet (1894–1981)

- אסתר ראב
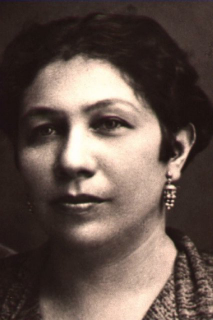
- Esther Raab
- Born: April 25, 1894; Petah Tikva, Ottoman Empire
- Died: September 4, 1981 (aged 87)
- Occupations: poet, prose writer
- Spouse(s): Yitzhak Green (1921-1930); Arieh Alwei (1932-1935)
- Writing career
- Language: Hebrew
- Years active: 1921-1981
- Notable awards: Kugel Prize awarded by the Municipality of Holon (1964); The Prime Minister's Prize for Hebrew Literary Works (1972)

Esther Raab (Hebrew: אסתר ראב; April 25, 1894 – September 4, 1981) was a Hebrew author of prose and poetry, known as "the first Sabra poet," due to her eminence as the first Israeli woman poet and for the prominence of her native landscape in her imagery.

== Biography ==
Esther Raab was born and raised in the rural moshava of Petah Tikva in Palestine (part of Ottoman Syria at the time), to founding residents Judah (Yehuda) and Leah Raab. Raab's grandfather was an immigrant from the Hungarian village of Szentistván who moved to Palestine with his son in 1876 and settled in Jerusalem. Raab was the second of four children born to Yehuda and Leah, Yehuda's second wife. In late 1909, the moshava’s school became co-ed, and Raab, aged fifteen, was prohibited by her father from attending. She later wrote that that decision hurt her a lot.

In 1913, she moved to Degania Alef, the earliest kibbutz (socialist Zionist farming commune), with Second Aliyah pioneers. In 1914, she returned to Petah Tikva.

In 1921, Raab visited her cousins, the Green family, in Cairo, Egypt. In December 1921, Raab married her cousin, Yitzhak Green, in Cairo. Raab and Green lived in Hilwan, a suburb of Cairo, for five years following their marriage. She then returned to Palestine (by then under British rule) and lived in Tel Aviv, where her home became a literary salon. Raab’s first poetry collection, Kimshonim ("Thistles"), was published in 1930. The collection is dedicated to Green, who died suddenly the same year. Raab was briefly remarried to artist Arieh Alwei from 1932 to 1935. In 1945, she returned to Petah Tikva. During that time, she studied education and worked in teaching and agriculture.

Raab continued to publish over several decades, often silent for years due to financial and other difficulties. Raab’s second poetry collection, Tefila Achrona ("Last Prayer"), was published in 1964.

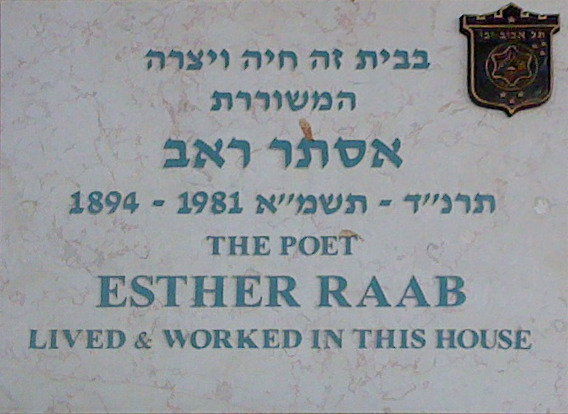
commemorative plaque on Raab's Tel Aviv home

Raab died in 1981. A line from her poem Neshoret ("Fallout") is written on her tombstone: "The clods of your soil were sweet to me, homeland, as the clouds in your skies."

Two collections of Raab's work were published after her death: Collected Poems in 1988 and Collected Prose in 2001. Both volumes were edited by Raab's nephew, Ehud ben Ezer. Ben Ezer is also the author of her 1998 biography, Yamim shel La'anah u-Devash ("Days of Gall and Honey").

== Poetry ==
Much of Raab's poetry is free verse, with no set rhyme or meter.

The principal theme in Raab's work is nature; she references particular plants and often describes the land of Israel in her works. Much of Raab's poetry also manipulates traditional ideas of sex and gender, challenging a concrete gender binary.

== Awards and recognition ==
- 1964 – Kugel Prize for literature, awarded by the Municipality of Holon for the poetry book The Poems of Esther Raab (in Hebrew)
- 1972 – the Prime Minister's Prize for Hebrew Literary Works

== Published works ==
Books in Hebrew

- Thistles (poems), Hedim, 1930 (Kimshonim, קמשונים)
- Poetry of Esther Raab (includes Thorns), Massada, 1963 (Shirei Esther Raab, שירי אסתר ראב)
- Last Prayer (poems), Am Oved, 1972 (Tefila Acharona, תפילה אחרונה)
- The Murmur of Roots, HaKibbutz HaMeuhad, 1976 (Hemyat Shorashim, המיית שורשים)
- A Destroyed Garden: selected stories and seven poems, Tarmil, 1983 (Gan She-Charav, גן שחרב)

Later Compilations and Editions in Hebrew

- Esther Raab, An Anthology: selected poems with an introduction, selected edited and introduced by Ehud Ben Ezer and Reuven Shoham, Yachdav and the Hebrew Writers Association, 1982 (Esther Raab, Yalkut Shirim, אסתר ראב ,ילקוט שירים)
- Complete Poetry, Zmora Bitan, 1988 (Kol Hashirim, כל השירים); a second edition published 1994
- Complete Prose, Astrolog, 2001 (Kol Haproza, כל הפרוזה)

Works in Translation

- English: Selected Poems of Esther Raab, translated by Ehud Ben-Ezer and the Institute for the Translation of Hebrew Literature, Bnei Brak, 1996
- English: Thistles: Selected Poems of Esther Raab, translated and introduced by Harold Schimmel, Jerusalem, 2002, ISBN 9659012489

== See also ==
- Rachel Bluwstein (1890–1931), friend and Hebrew poet, known as "Rachel the poetess"
