= Elisha Porat =

Hebrew poet

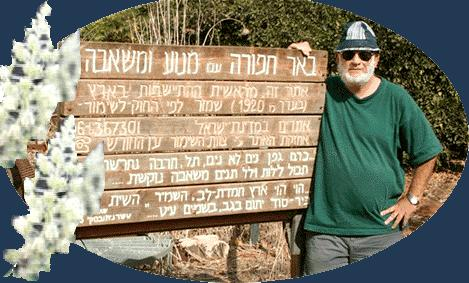
Elisha Porat

Elisha Porat (Hebrew: אלישע פורת; June 25, 1938 - March 24, 2013) was an Israeli poet and writer in the Hebrew language.

== Literary career ==
From 1973, Elisha Porat published 19 volumes of Hebrew fiction and poetry. In 1996, he was awarded Israel's Prime Minister's Prize for Literature. His works have appeared in translation in Israel, the United States, Canada and England. The English translation of his short stories collection "The Messiah of LaGuardia", was released in 1997. The English translation of his second stories collection "PAYBACK", was published in 2002. His novel, Episode, was published in 2006.
