= Avirama Golan =

Israeli journalist, writer, and translator

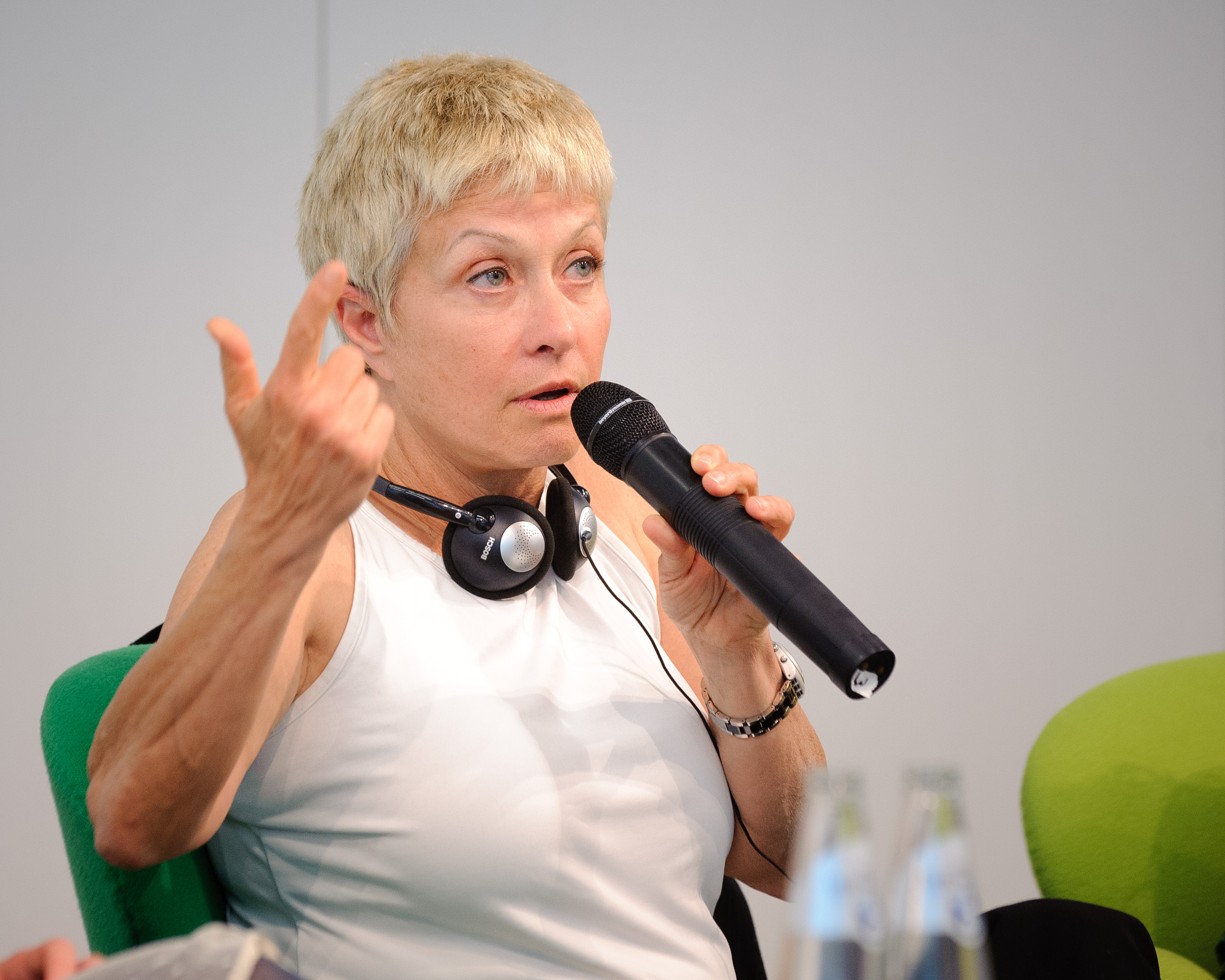
Avirama Golan, 2012

Avirama Golan (Hebrew: אבירמה גולן, born 1950) is an Israeli journalist, columnist, translator, and writer.

Her journalistic associations include Davar, Haaretz (since 1992 until present), and Liberal Magazine.

In 2012 she became director of the Center for Urbanism and Mediterranean Culture in Bat Yam.

She has published novels, non-fiction and children’s books, translated children's literature into Hebrew, and wrote screenplays for children's TV.

== Awards ==
- 2011: ACUM Prize for 2010
- 2014: Prime Minister's Prize for Hebrew Literary Works
- 2023: Knight of the order of Legion of Honour, France, for her propagation of French culture in Israel
