= Josef Mundy =

Israeli author and playwright (1935-1994)

Josef Mundy

Josef Mundy (Hebrew: ג'וזף מונדי; 1935 in Bucharest, Romania – 1994 in New York City, New York) was an Israeli author and playwright.

Josef Mundy was born in Bucharest to a prosperous middle-class family. At the age of 16 he immigrated to Israel. In the 1960s he lived for a while in France. In general, he spent years abroad throughout his life. HaMashber ("the crisis", in Hebrew) published in 1970, was his first play to gain recognition. Initially staged by HaMartef ("the basement") Theatre, it had an eventual run of over 1,000 performances. His plays have been performed by leading Israeli theatre companies including the "Cameri" and "Habima", and at the Acco Festival of Alternative Israeli Theatre. Mundy's works, with political, controversial, and Absurdist elements, show a Brechtian influence. Mundy died in New York City at the age of 59, while rehearsing one of his plays at "La Mama" Theatre.
