= Bracha Serri =

Israeli poet

Bracha Serri ברכה סרי
- Born: July 13, 1940; Sana'a, Yemen
- Died: April 25, 2013 (aged 72); Jerusalem
- Occupation: Poet
- Writing career
- Pen name: Pu'ah Meri-Dor
- Language: Hebrew
- Years active: 1970–2013
- Subjects: Mizrahi people, feminism, occupation of Palestine
- Notable awards: Prime Minister's Literature Award, 1990

Bracha Serri (in Hebrew: ברכה סרי; July 13, 1940 – April 25, 2013) was an Israeli poet, recipient of the Prime Minister's Literature Award for 1990.

== Biography ==
Serri was born in Sana'a, Yemen, to a religious Jewish family. Her father, Moshe ("Mosi") was a shopkeeper, and a student of Rabbi Yiḥyah Qafiḥ, leader of the Dor Daim religious stream. Her mother was Hamama, most of whose family already lived in Israel since 1932. Serri came to Israel at the age of 10 with her parents in Operation Magic Carpet. The family settled in the Yemenite neighborhood near Kiryat Ata. Serri has a BA an MA in Hebrew and Semitic Linguistics from the Hebrew University of Jerusalem, and worked researching Yemenite dialects, especially the language of women.

During the 1960s and 1970s, in Jerusalem, there was a surge of social movements, affected by similar developments elsewhere in the world, dealing with social and political rights – including the Black Panthers (Mizrahi social movement) and Matzpen (anti-Zionism). Serri became involved a group on campus dedicated to empowerment of the Yemenite population. Serri taught Hebrew to Palestinians from East Jerusalem (only recently conquered by Israel, in 1967), and initiated literacy campaigns in immigrant communities. In the early 1970s, she married an American-born ex-hippy, whom she later left with her two young children due to domestic violence, and raised them alone.

In cooperation with the Jerusalem municipality, Serri ran youth programs, but often found herself at odds with the bureaucratic establishment. This was a recurring theme for Serri, who found herself on the margins of almost every social and institutional setting: At the university, she found intellectual development, but detachment from her religion, culture and tradition. In her work with the city and with religious organizations, she was the "primitive" Mizrahi in an Ashkenazi world. In a nation ruled by military men, she was a woman.

During 1989–1997 Serri lived in Berkeley, California.

== Writing ==
Serri's writing focuses on several main subjects, including Judaism, Mizrahi identity, and political feminism. Her often overtly political and feminist poetry draws heavily on the metaphoric tradition of the great Yemenite poets, such as Shalom Shabazi.

Her first published work was a short story, "Kri'a" ("Tearing", 1980), which appeared in the feminist journal Noga. The story was adapted into a play by the same name, which ran for over a year, toured twice between 1983 and 1987, and garnered praise from the critics. The story, dealing with the patriarchal traditions of marriage in Yemen, was also included in a women's stories anthology in 1994. It tells of the wedding night of a young girl, given in marriage by her father to an old man, who is already twice-widowed. The girl is completely innocent and unprepared for what is to come. The narrative is from the girl's perspective, and is described as a violent rape, which is, in her culture, the rite of passage from girlhood to womanhood, which to her horror, means complete enslavement to home and family. She becomes pregnant, and the story ends with the difficult description of giving birth to her first son. She wrote this story under a pen name, Pu'ah Meri-Dor, in her words, "out of embarrassment" because of the taboo subject.

At the core of Serri's writing are autobiographical foundations. One was her mother, who was uneducated, married young, and gave birth to 18 children. Serri wanted to empower women like her mother, and give them voice. She recalled that she wrote her poems for her mother, but was afraid that she would think Serri was mocking her when she handed her the published book. But to Serri, her mother was the first poet she knew. The women in Yemen, who led lives almost completely separate from the men, would sing or chant about their problems and feelings while doing household tasks, repeating and adding lines as they moved from chore to chore. It was only upon arriving in Israel, Serri said, that her mother fell silent. This was the more personal, and feminist aspect.

But her writing was also influenced by her father, who was, political, revolutionary, and a social and educational reformer. He was part of the Dor Daim movement in Yemen, and orthodox stream that believed in expanding education, for women as well, developing independent thought, and moving away from superstition and ignorance. Her poetry melds both these influences with the reality of her own time and place, and her status within it.

The political aspects of Serri's writing express left-ideology and issues relating to Mizrahi culture and identity in Israel. Her poetry collection, Seventy Wandering Poems (1983) combined beat generation stylings with Yemeni traditions and feminist expression. In her writing and in her activism, she began to create connections between the social struggle of the Mizrahim in Israel to the immorality of the occupation of Palestine, while as a Mizrahi feminist, outlining the patronizing, patriarchal attitudes of the Israeli left, in particular in her later collections, Sacred Cow (1990) and Red Heifer (1991).

Serri founded a publishing house, Ha'Or Ha'Ganuz, after her poems were rejected by the mainstream publishers, who published Ashkenazi poets almost exclusively. The innovation of her work was reflected also in the design of the books she published. Her writing became highly intertextual, incorporating references from the Bible dealing with women, while pointing to the conditions of Mizrahi women living in the modern age who refuse to let go of their traditions. Her work also incorporates her social activism, similarly to her contemporary, Vicki Shiran, and Jewish themes, like the poet Haviva Pedaya. Her writing is considered interdisciplinary, postmodern, and feminist.

Her work was included in the anthology of Mizrahi poetry, One Hundred Years, One Hundred Writers: A Collection of Hebrew Poems by Mizrahi Poets of the 20th Century, edited by Sami Shalom Chetrit (1980). Her poems have also been anthologized in The Tribe of Dinah (1989).

From the beginnings, in which her work was refused by publishers, Serri has become an important figure in the study and criticism of Israeli poetry, in recognition of her important literary contribution.

== Works ==
- Seventy Poems of Wandering שבעים שירי שוטטות, ירושלים: הוצאה עצמית, 1983.
- Red Cow פרה אדומה, תל אביב: הוצאת ברירות, 1990.
- Sanctification (Book of Covenant and Grace, part 1) קידושין (ספר הברית והחסד – חלק א'), ירושלים: הוצאת האור הגנוז, 2000.
- Nurit: Lessons in the Discipline of Work (Book of Covenant and Grace, part 2) נורית: שיעורים בתורת העבודה (ספרי הברית והחסד – חלק ב'), ירושלים: הוצאת האור הגנוז, 2001.
- Prayers and Silences תפילות ושתיקות (ספרי הברית והחסד – חלק ג'), ירושלים: הוצאת האור הגנוז, 2002.
- Edna: Stopping and Voyaging in Fifty Gates עדנה: חניה ומסע בחמישים שערים, ירושלים: הוצאת האור הגנוז, 2005.
- Wisdom בינה, ירושלים: הוצאת האור הגנוז, 2006.
- Of Wine בת יין, ירושלים: הוצאת האור הגנוז, 2007.
- Yakum Porkan יקום פורקן התש"ע, ירושלים: הוצאת האור הגנוז, 2011.
- Illiterate: a collection of translated poems, Berkeley: Ha'Or Ha'Ganuz, 1995.

== Awards ==
- 1998 – New Immigrant Excellence Award
- 2009 – Prime Minister's Literature Award
- 2011 – Libi BaMizrach (My Heart is in the East) Special Commendation

== Additional reading ==
- בסוד ברכה : יצירתה של ברכה סרי Be-sod Berakhah : Yetsiratah shel Berakhah Serri
  In secret blessing : the poetry of Bracha Serri; Henriette Dahan Kalev; Jerusalem : Karmel, 2013.
