= Ramy Ditzanny =

Israeli poet

Ramy Ditzanny (Hebrew: רמי דיצני; 1950 – 15 July 2012) was an Israeli poet.

== Biography ==
Ditzanny was a certified Electronics Engineer and Tour guide, and studied at the London Film School.

His most famous poem is Baal Akhshuv, which can be translated as Lord of the Spiders. The name is a parody of Baal Zevuv, "Lord of the Flies." Subtle connections are made between the ancient Canaanites and the modern Palestinians.

He died on 15 July 2012 at the age of 62.
