= Alex Epstein (Israeli writer) =

Israeli writer

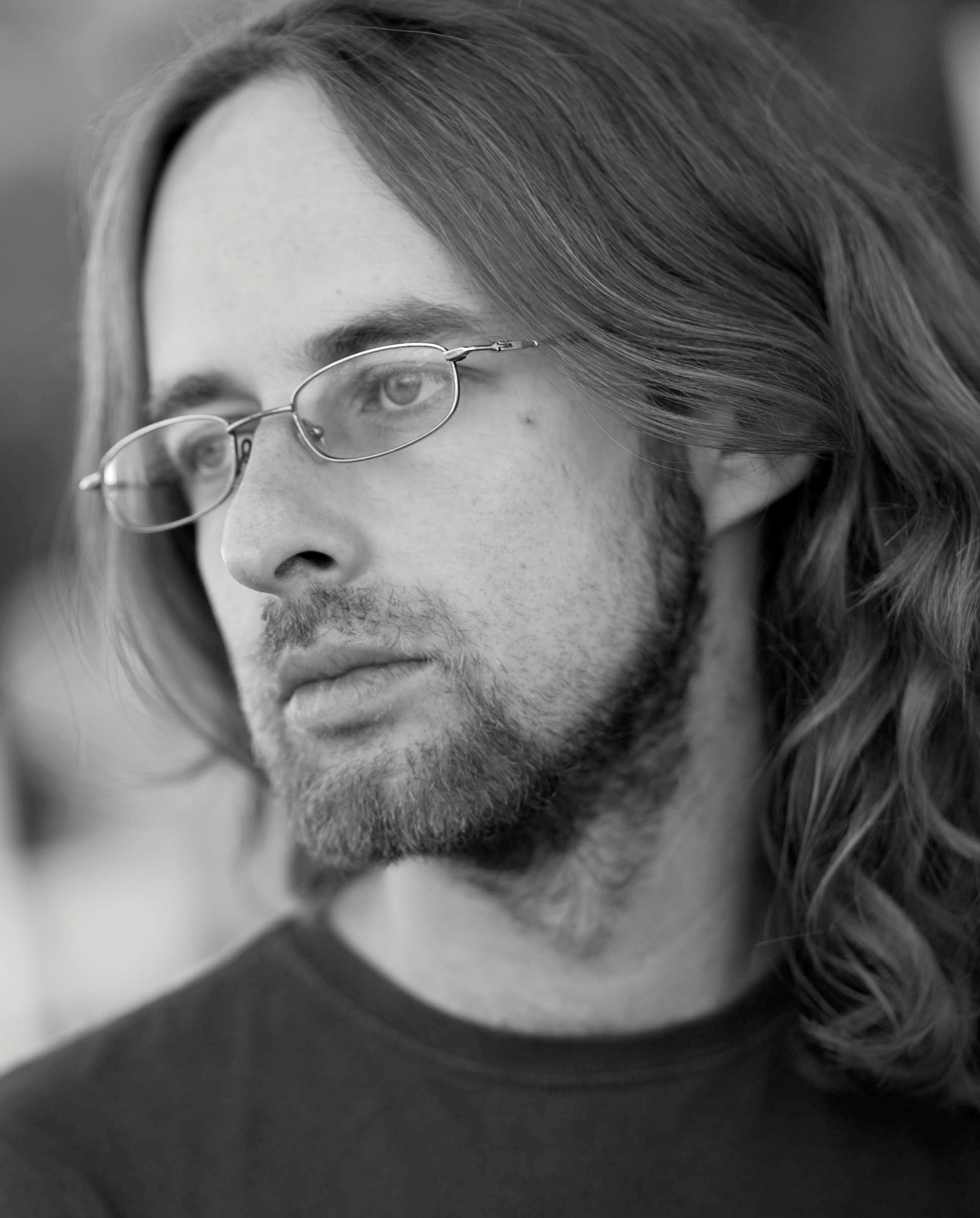
Alex Epstein

Alex Epstein (Hebrew: אלכס אפשטיין; born 1971, Saint Petersburg) is an Israeli writer, known for his micro stories. He moved to Israel at the age of eight and lived with his family in the city of Lod. Epstein received his first publishing contract from Zamora-Bitan at 23. He has since published three novels and eight collections of stories in Hebrew, as well as numerous pieces in English-language journals including Ploughshares, The Kenyon Review, Guernica, JuxtaProse Literary Magazine, Zeek, Electric Literature, The Guardian, and The Collagist. His translations in Electric Literature were illustrated by renowned Israeli artist and animator, David Polonsky. Epstein has twice received the Israeli Prime Minister's Prize for Authors and Poets (2003; 2016). Epstein lives in Tel Aviv and has served as a writer-in-residence for the International Writing Program at the University of Iowa, and as a Schusterman Family Foundation Artist-in-Residence at the University of Denver in Denver, Colorado (2010). In 2010 he took part of the PEN World Voices Festival in New York, he was featured in a panel with other writers such as Claire Messud, Lorraine Adams, Norman Rush, Yiyun Li and Aleksandar Hemon.

Alex Epstein's very brief stories (some of them as short as one sentence) have been described as examples of the "philosophical, or allegorical short-short story", one of the primary types of short story common to contemporary Hebrew writing. In a National Post review of Epstein's second English-language collection, writer Ian McGillis said that Epstein's works invited comparison to both "contemporary McSweeney's-style pranksters and the august lineage of Kafka, Borges and Bruno Schulz". Likewise, The Forward named Epstein "Israel's Borges." Epstein's work has been translated into numerous languages, including English, French, Portuguese and Russian. American publisher Clockroot Books published two translated collections of his work, Blue Has No South (2010) and Lunar Savings Time (2011). His second collection was widely and well-reviewed in Publishers Weekly, Three Percent, The Millions, Words Without Borders, and elsewhere. An experimentalist both in terms of narrative and format, Epstein's literature app "True Legends" was made available in 2014 and reviewed by the LA Times. Israel's premier daily newspaper, Haaretz, regularly publishes his stories under the title "Ktsartsarim" (short-shorts). The English Haaretz has also featured his work. His microfiction has been the subject of at least one peer-reviewed academic article in Shofar (2015), "The Shape of Time in Microfiction: Alex Epstein and the Search for Lost Time."

== Books in English ==
- Blue Has No South, Clockroot Books, 2010, ISBN 978-1-56656-806-7 (paperback).
- Lunar Savings Time, Clockroot Books, 2011, ISBN 978-1-56656-852-4 (paperback).
