= Glauberman =

Glauberman is a surname. Notable people with the surname include:

- Dana E. Glauberman (born 1968), American film editor
- George Glauberman (born 1941), American mathematician
