= Navit Barel =

Israeli poet, translator, literary editor, literary researcher (born 1977)

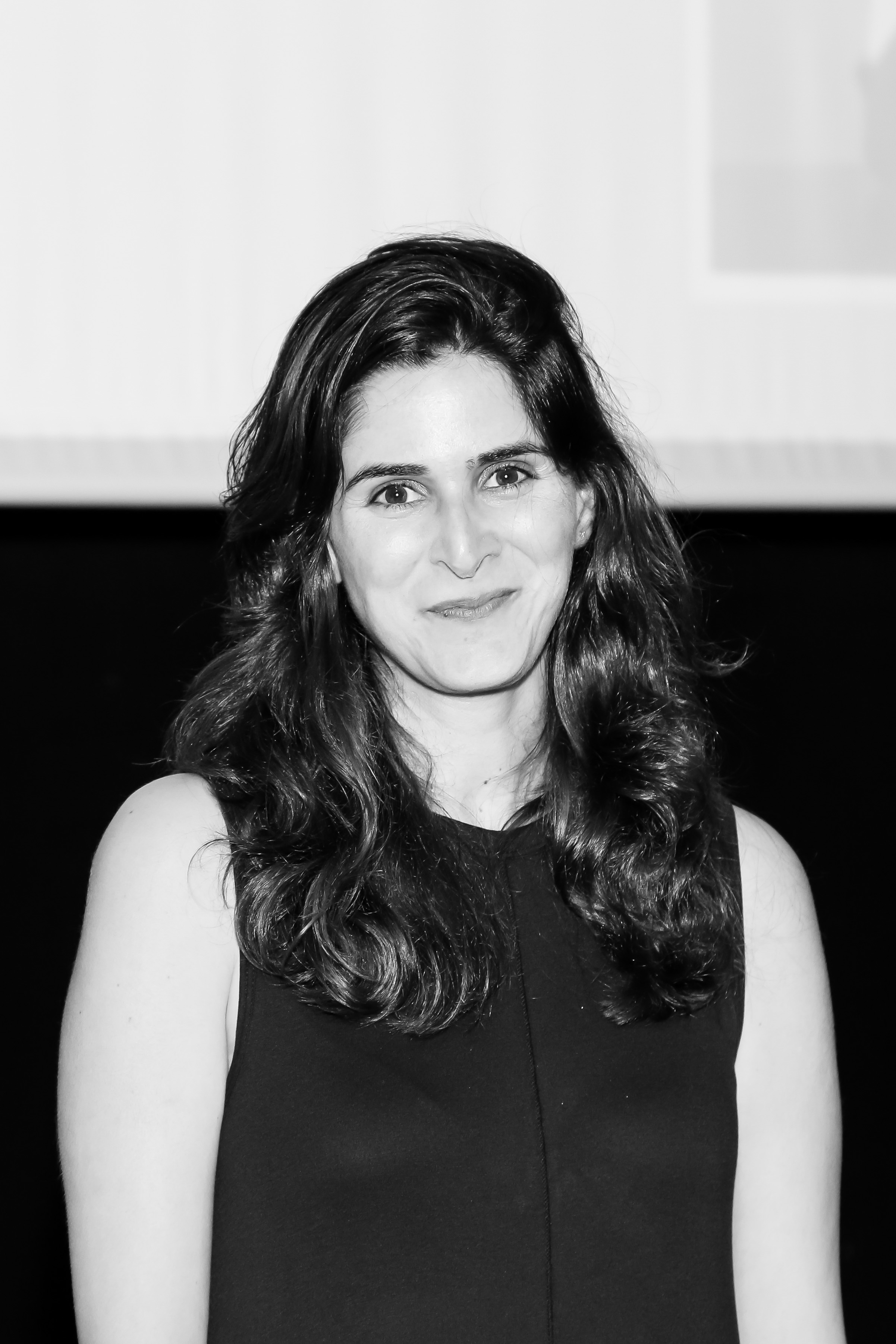
Navit Barel at the award ceremony, 2017

Navit Barel (Hebrew: נוית בראל; born 1977) is an Israeli poet, editor, literary critic, translator, scholar of Israeli literature, editor-in-chief of the book publishing house Helikon and the editor of the literary magazine with the same name.

== Biography ==
Navit Barel was born in Ashkelon to a family of immigrants from Libya. She earned her Ph.D. (Tel Aviv University, 2019) on some aspects of the poetry of Dahlia Ravikovitch.

== Awards ==
- 2017: Prime Minister's Prize for Hebrew Literary Works. The judges' rationale: "Barel writes delicate lyrical poetry, words that process reality transparently and at once illuminate the caverns of the naked soul within a house and within a body. These appear as parallel spaces whose interplay is the foundation for slavery and freedom of the soul. Her poetry processes and reprocesses the experience of orphanhood, and from within it the close distance and the alien intimacy between men and women and between a person and himself are remeasured."
