= Adi Sorek =

Israeli writer and editor

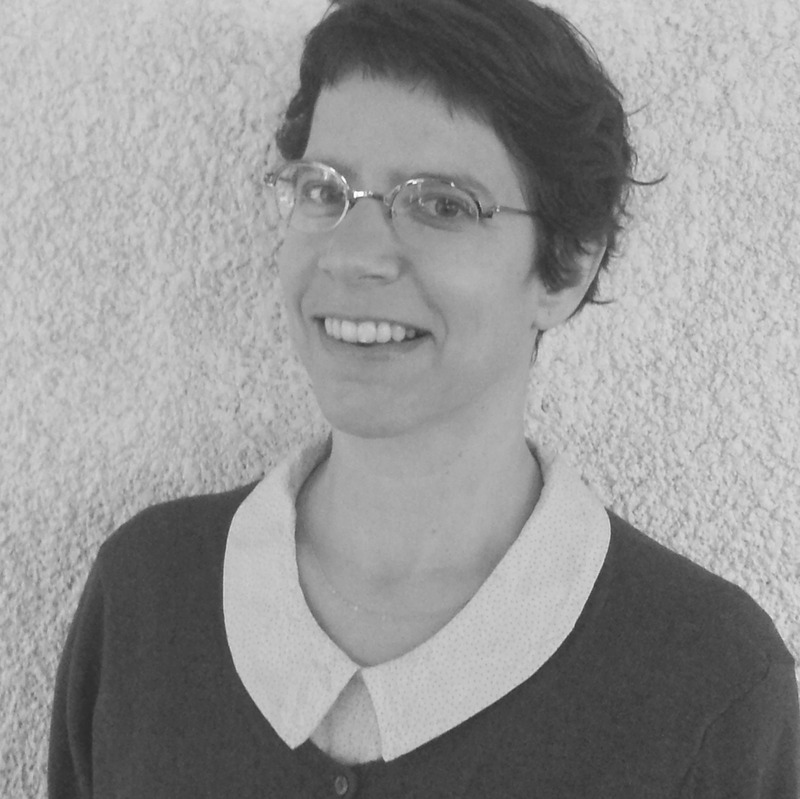
Adi Sorek

Adi Sorek (Hebrew: עדי שורק; born 1970) is an Israeli writer and editor who lives in Tel Aviv. She is the author of five fiction books, winner of the 2019 Levi Eshkol Prime Minister’s Award for Hebrew Authors, the 2012 Leib-Goldberg Award for Literary Works and second place of the 1999 Moses Foundation Literary Award. Her latest novel, Nathan, was nominated for the 2019 Sapir Prize.

She is also the founding and chief editor of the Vashti prose series at Resling Publishing and a doctoral student at the Department for Comparative Literature at Tel Aviv University. Her dissertation discusses the notion of cities of refuge in the Babylonian Talmud and modern Jewish literature.

She was born in Nes Ziona, Israel, and later lived in Kibbutz Alumot and Kibbutz Ein Gev. In 1979 she moved with her family to Haifa where she lived for about ten years. In 1989, her family immigrated to the United States and she remained in Tel Aviv. At the age of 27, she began studying literature at Tel Aviv University, from which she graduated with honours.

In 2004, she founded Vashti, a prose series published by Resling Publishing.

In addition to her writing in prose, Adi Sorek also writes essays on literature and other subjects. She has published stories and essays in various periodicals and anthologies such as Orot, Studio, Resling, Orienteering and Granetta.

The judges of the Prime Minister’s Award wrote: “Adi Sorek is a top-notch author and editor. In her books, she has established a unique style of writing that boldly explores the boundaries of creative expression from within and without. Her books unfold for her readers a dense tapestry of affinities and allusions to Hebrew and world literature, erecting multi-layered and polyphonic texts. With genre-defying prose, often blending into existential essayist writing, she brings to the surface questions about home, place and space. In addition, as founder and editor of the Vashti Books Series at Resling Publishing, Adi Sorek has introduced international, avant-garde authors to Israeli readers.”

Panel of Judges: Eyal Dotan, Meron Rapaport, Galit Distal Atbaryan, December 2019

== Books by Adi Sorek ==
- Nathan (a novel) Keter Publishing 2018 (ed: Oded Walkstein) - Nominated for the 2019 Sapir Award. Nathan, a successful businessman who had lost his job and got into some serious debt, leaves his family behind in Israel and travels to New York in search of employment. He sleeps at a friend’s place in Brooklyn and dreams of getting an interview with Hal Griffith, a tycoon capable – so they say – of turning everything around. But Nathan’s path to Griffith’s door grows ever trickier. Meanwhile, Nathan, who remained speechless at his father’s funeral, wanders the streets of New York – which is unforgettably portrayed in this novel – and the city conjures words for him that he had never known. Little by little, Nathan becomes unmoored from more and more of his life and is beckoned by memories not his own, though he recognizes in them the mark of the silences that have always enveloped him. From one street corner to the next, from one bench to another, Nathan is summoned to the threshold of ancient stories, which he reiterates through his own tales: the man depleted of deeds and of stories has become unawares a narrator. Adi Sorek’s Hebrew traces this metamorphosis as it slips in and out of climates and melodies that have been marginalized in contemporary Israeli culture, prophesizing its forgotten history with a marvellous filigree collage. Nathan captures the experience of immigration in today’s global era with sadness-tinged humour, linking it to the tradition of Jewish immigration to New York in the early 20th century. Nathan discovers the United States as a harsh dreamland while Israel, the abandoned homeland, remains dear to heart but laden with problems and failure.
- Sometimes you lose people (short story collection) Yediot Books 2013 (ed: Navit Barel) - Winner of the Goldberg Prize. The book opens with a novella entitled “Sometimes You Lose People” – about the detached existence of a young woman who longs to find a lost friend and in the process raises questions about closeness and loss. The novella, inspired by Gertrud Stein’s style, is written in an intense and musical syntactic rhythm, contrasting a slightly aloof-amused register with some pain-filled contents. The rest of the book consists of short, sometimes very short stories, creating a thematic patchwork quilt which moves between homelessness and homeliness. Despite the fact that each story stands on its own, many stories are interwoven – as a sequel, as a parallel story, or as a story that completes a certain move started by a previous one.
- Internal Tourism Yediot Books 2005 (ed: Michal Ben-Naftali) - a collection of short stories that includes three Alphabetical cycles: "Alphabet Tel Aviv", "Alphabet woman" and "Alphabet Haifa". Each cycle has its own Oulipian writing rules and creates a private-public dictionary and map.
- Spaces (a short novel) Resling Publishing 2004, in: Spaces, Airports, Mall - This novella deals with the building of spaces and with the characters operating in them. The story, which describes a fortnight in the life of the narrator, who makes a living as an artistic house painter, takes place in the Azrieli Center (a complex of skyscrapers in the center of Tel Aviv built on top of a shopping mall) and in villas being built in the periphery. With unique density and rhythm, the text captures numerous minutiae of Israeli society and its spaces.
- Seven matrons (a novel) Yediot Books 2001 (ed: Lili Peri) - The novel combines the childhood memories of a character named A with a plot progression in which a young woman wishes to shoot a film in South Tel Aviv, with the aid of a crew of unskilled neighbors and bizarre passers-by, seven matrons looking for a stage.

== A selection of books edited by Vashti ==
=== Translated books ===
- The Use of Speech - Nathalie Sarraute (Translation - Hagit Bat Ada, Scientific Editing - Dr. Dafna Schnitzer), 2004.
- Portrait of the Artist as a Young Dog - Dylan Thomas (Translation - Oded Peled, Scientific Editing - Prof. Avraham Oz ), 2004.
- Paris, France - Gertrude Stein, Translation - Edith Shorer, Afterword - Dr. Orly Lubin, Scientific Editing - Dr. Einat Avrahami, 2004.
- Proust - Samuel Beckett Translated by Idit Shorer, translation of French quotations - Helit Yeshurun, 2005.
- The event - Annie Ernaux Translated by Nora Bonneh, 2009.
- Perhaps the Heart - Emily Dickinson Translated and edited by Lilach Lachman, 2006.
- Nadja - Andre Breton Translated by Michal Ben-Naftali, 2007
- Book, Childhood - Michal Ben Naftali, 2007.

=== Anthologies featured ===
Look at Him, (story), in: "His Consistent Love", Shai Tzur and Michal Heruti (eds.), Yedioth Ahronoth Publishing, 2005. ("Essays and Points"), in: "How was Avot Yeshurun," Lilach Lachman (ed.), Hakibbutz Hameuchad Publishing House, 2011. Stories, in "Two", Tamer Masalha, Tamar Weiss-Gabay, Almog Behar (eds.), Keter Publishers, 2014. Connected to the Movie (story), in "You Too Crying?", Ricky Cohen (ed.), Buxila, Digital Collection, 2013
