= Yael Globerman =

Israeli writer, poet and translator (born 1954)

- יעל גלוברמן
- Born: 1954 (age 71–72); Tel Aviv, Israel
- Occupations: Poet, writer, translator, book editor, educator
- Spouse: Jack Adelist (divorced)
- Children: 2
- Writing career
- Notable works: Shaking the Tree, Alibi, Same River Twice, Map of the Peninsula
- Notable awards: ACUM Prize (2000, 2018), Mifal HaPayis Prize (2002), Prime Minister's Prize for Hebrew Literary Works (2020)

Yael Globerman (Hebrew: יעל גלוברמן; born 1954) is an Israeli poet, writer, translator, book editor, and educator in literature.

== Biography ==
She was born in Tel Aviv to emigrants from Poland to Israel after the Holocaust. She graduated from the Herzliya Hebrew Gymnasium, she enlisted in the Nahal. During that time she began publishing poems and stories in periodicals. After military service she studied painting and sculpture at the Free University (unrecognized), The Hague, and graduated from Steve Tisch School of Film and Television, Tel Aviv University. Since the 1980s she lived for about 10 years in the United States with actor Jack Adelist and they had two children. They divorced and in 1992 she returned to Israel.

== Books ==
- 1996: Shaking the Tree, novel
- 2000: Alibi, poetry
- 2007: Same River Twice, poetry
- 2018: Map of the Peninsula, poetry

== Awards ==
- 2000: ACUM Prize for her debut poetry book Alibi
- 2002 Mifal HaPayis Prize
- 2018: ACUM Prize for Map of the Peninsula
- 2020: Prime Minister's Prize for Hebrew Literary Works
