= Israel Pincas =

Israeli poet (1935–2026)

- ישראל פנקס
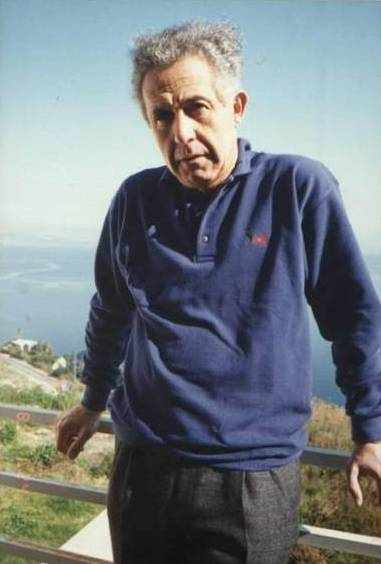
- Born: January 28, 1935; Sofia, Bulgaria
- Died: July 19, 2026 (aged 91); Tel Aviv, Israel
- Burial place: Ganey Esther cemetery, Rishon Letzion
- Occupation: Poet
- Notable work: Ilmale
- Awards: Bernstein Prize; Israel Prime Minister's Prize; Israel Prize (2005)

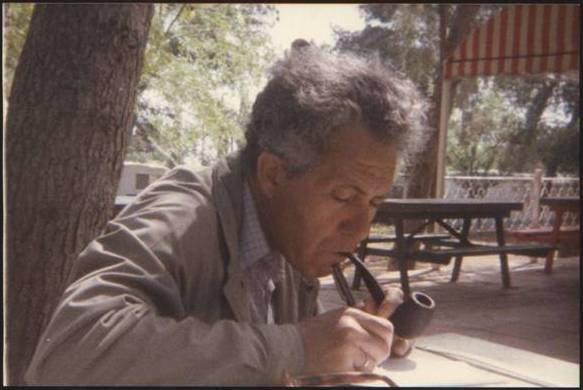
Israel Pincas

Israel Pincas (Hebrew: ישראל פנקס; January 28, 1935 – July 19, 2026) was an Israeli poet.

== Life and career ==
Pincas was born in Sofia, Bulgaria on January 28, 1935. He lost his father at the age of six. He emigrated to Mandate Palestine with his mother in 1944. When serving in the IDF, he was also a military correspondent. He lived in Tel Aviv.

== Death ==
Pincas died on July 19, 2026, at the age of 91.

== Published works ==
In 1951, Pincas started publishing poetry in Israeli newspapers and magazines. Pincas later published his first book of poetry, 14 Poems, in 1961. His poems were published in various literary supplements of daily newspapers and periodicals. Many of his poems were published in the magazine Exclamation Point, after many years of nonrecognition. He published eight books of poetry, many of which were issued by the Exclamation Point publishing house. He also worked as an editor for the local office of the United Press news agency. Pincas translated several books by Shlomo Kalo from Bulgarian to Hebrew. In 2012, he published the collection of poetry "Diskurs über die Zeit" ("Discourse about time"), translated into German (Stiftung Lyrik Kabinett München).

== Awards ==
Pincas received the Bernstein Prize as well as the Israel Prime Minister's Prize. In 2005, Pincas was awarded the Israel Prize for poetry.
