= Amir Gilboa =

Israeli poet (1917–1984)

- אמיר גלבע
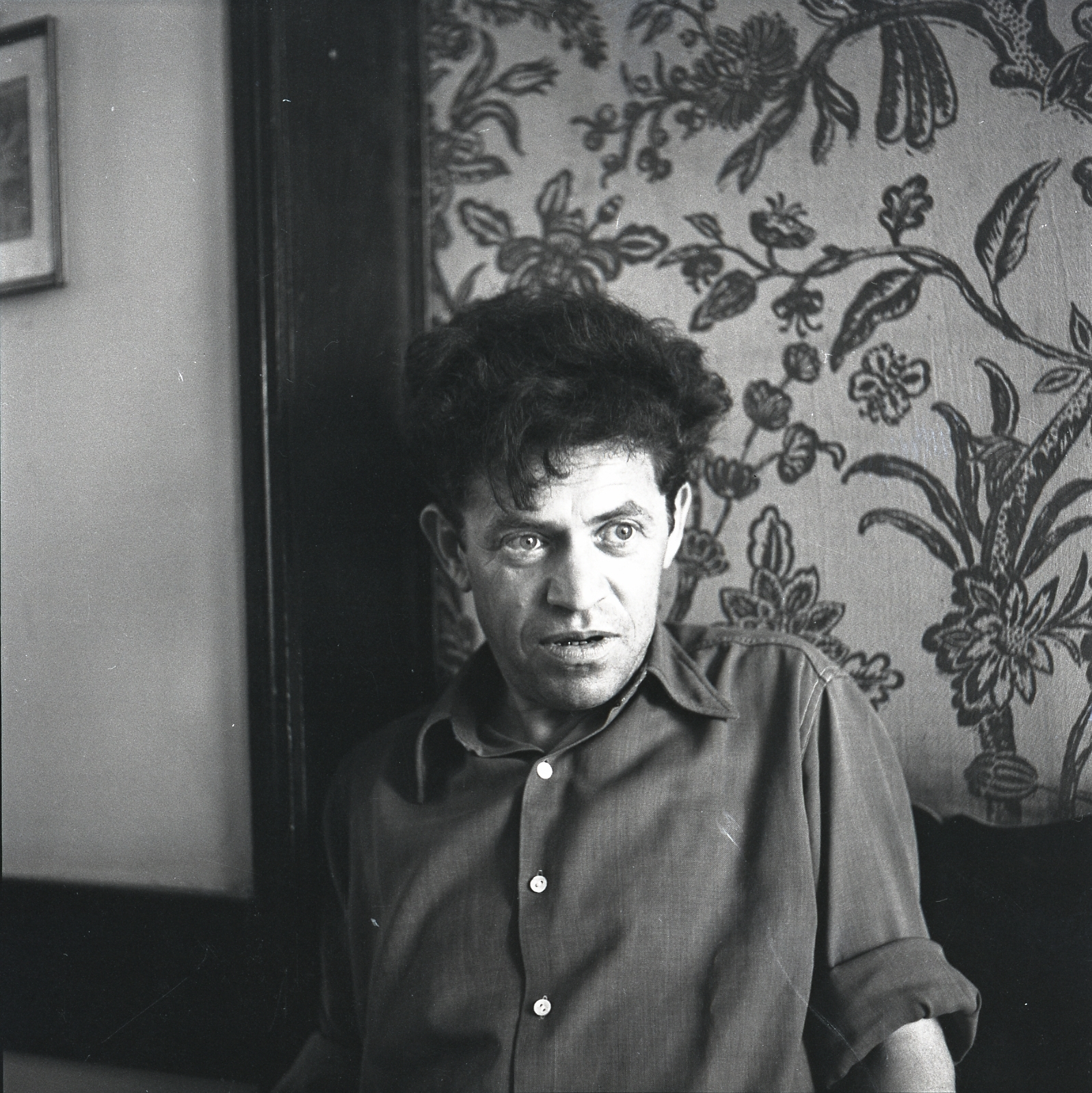
- Gilboa, 1953
- Born: Berl Feldmann; September 25, 1917; Radziwillow, Volhynia, Ukraine
- Died: September 2, 1984 (aged 66); Petah Tikva, Israel
- Occupation: Poet
- Known for: Hebrew poetry
- Awards: Bialik Prize (1971); Israel Prize (1982)

Amir Gilboa (Hebrew: אמיר גלבע; born 25 September 1917 – died 2 September 1984) was an Israeli poet. Gilboa was awarded the Israel Prize for literature in 1982.

== Biography ==
Berl Feldmann (later Amir Gilboa) was born to a Jewish family in Radziwillow (now Radyvyliv, Volhynia) in Ukraine. In 1937, he immigrated to Mandate Palestine. In 1942, he enlisted in the British Army and fought with the Jewish Brigade after its formation. In 1948, he fought in Israel's Independence War. He died in 1984 at Beilinson Hospital in Petah Tikva due to complications from ischemic heart disease.

== Literary career ==
In 1949, he published a volume of poetry entitled Sheva Reshuyot ("Seven Domains") about his war-time experiences. This collection, along with his Early Morning Songs, published in 1953, established his reputation as a leading Hebrew poet. His early work was influenced by Avraham Shlonsky and Natan Alterman, especially in its use of archaic, biblical Hebrew. Later, his language becomes more colloquial, with an abundance of rhymes, word play and satirical commentary. I Wanted to Write the Lips of Sleepers, published in 1968, is devoted to the act of writing poetry and the poet's feelings.

== Awards and recognition ==
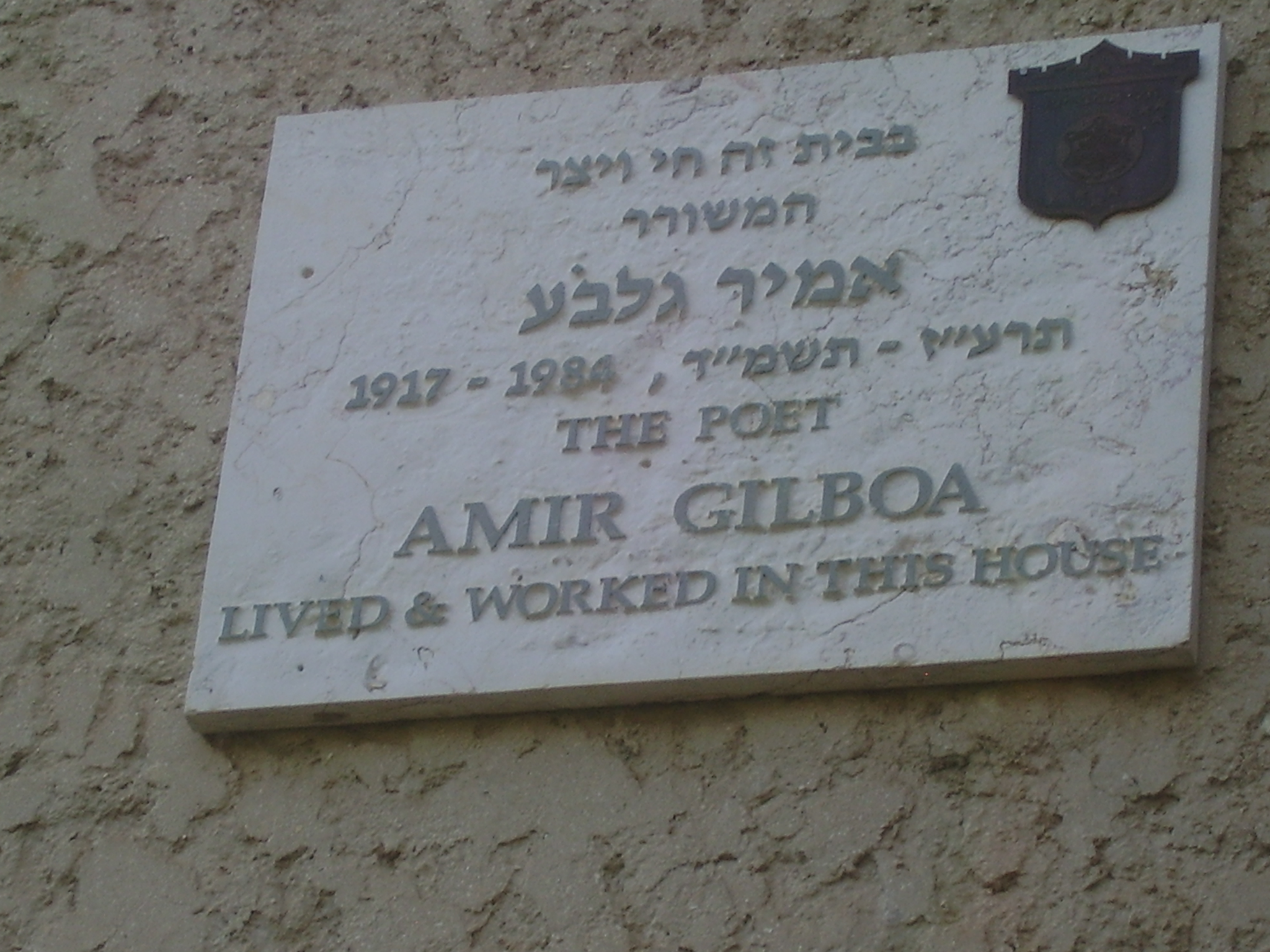
Memorial plaque on Gilboa's home in Tel Aviv

- In 1971, Gilboa was awarded the Bialik Prize for literature.
- In 1982, he was awarded the Israel Prize, for Hebrew poetry.

== See also ==
- List of Israel Prize recipients
- List of Bialik Prize recipients
