= Rami Saari =

Israeli poet, linguist and translator

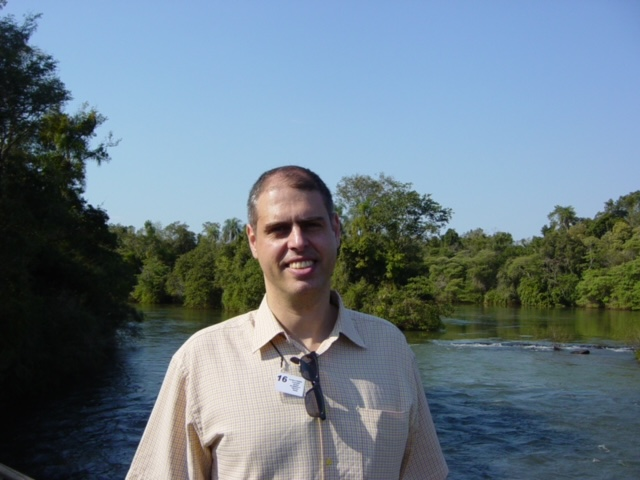
Rami Saari

Rami Saari (Hebrew: רמי סערי; born 17 September 1963, Petah Tikva, Israel) is an Israeli poet, translator, linguist and literary critic.

== Biography ==
Saari studied Semitic and Uralic languages at the Universities of Helsinki, Budapest and Jerusalem. He did his PhD in linguistics at the Hebrew University of Jerusalem. His doctoral thesis, "Maltese Prepositions", was published in 2003 by Carmel Publishing House.

== Career ==
The author has published fourteen volumes of his own poetry and translated more than one hundred books of prose and poetry, from Albanian, Catalan, Estonian, Finnish, Greek, Hungarian, Portuguese, Spanish and Turkish. In 2002-2006, Saari was the national editor of the Israeli pages of the Poetry International website. Saari has won several Israeli literature awards.

== Personal life ==
Since 2003 he lives and works in several different locales. He also holds Argentine and Finnish citizenships.

== Awards and honors ==
- In 1996 and 2003, Saari was awarded the Prime Minister’s Prize for Literature.
- In 2006, he received the Tchernichovsky Prize for exemplary translation.
- In 2010, he was awarded the Asraf Prize of the Academy of the Hebrew Language for his contribution to the enrichment of Hebrew literature.

== Works (Hebrew) ==
=== Poetry ===
- Hinneh, Matzati et Beti (Behold, I've Found My Home), Alef, 1988
- Gvarim ba-Tzomet (Men at the Crossroad), Sifriat Poalim, 1991
- Maslul ha-Ke'ev ha-No'az (The Path of Bold Pain), Schocken, 1997
- Ha-Sefer ha-Xai (The Living Book), Hakibbutz Hameuchad, 2001
- Kamma, Kamma Milxama (So Much, So Much War), Hakibbutz Hameuchad, 2002
- Ha-Shogun ha-Xamishi (The Fifth Shogun), Hakibbutz Hameuchad, 2005
- Tab'ot ha-Shanim (Rings of the Years), Hakibbutz Hameuchad, 2008
- Mavo le-Valshanut Minit (Introduction to Sexual Linguistics), Carmel, 2013
- Bnei Kafavis u-Nkhadav (Cavafy's Sons and Grandsons), Carmel, 2015
- Mesarim mi-Loikhpatlistan (Messages from Icouldntcarelessland), Carmel, 2016
- Doktor Yosefa ve-ha-pitgamim (Dr. Josepha and the Proverbs), Carmel, 2019
- Enzimim ba-nefesh ve-yamim ke-tiqqunam (Enzymes in the Soul and Regularized Times), Carmel, 2021
- Al miftan ensof ha-zman (On the Threshold of Endless Time), Rimonim, 2024
- Ha-Adam, ha-'Am ve-ha-'Olam (The Human, the People and the World), Carmel, 2026

=== Doctoral thesis ===
- Milot ha-Yakhas ha-Malteziyot (Maltese Prepositions), Carmel, 2003
