= Maya Bejerano =

Israeli poet

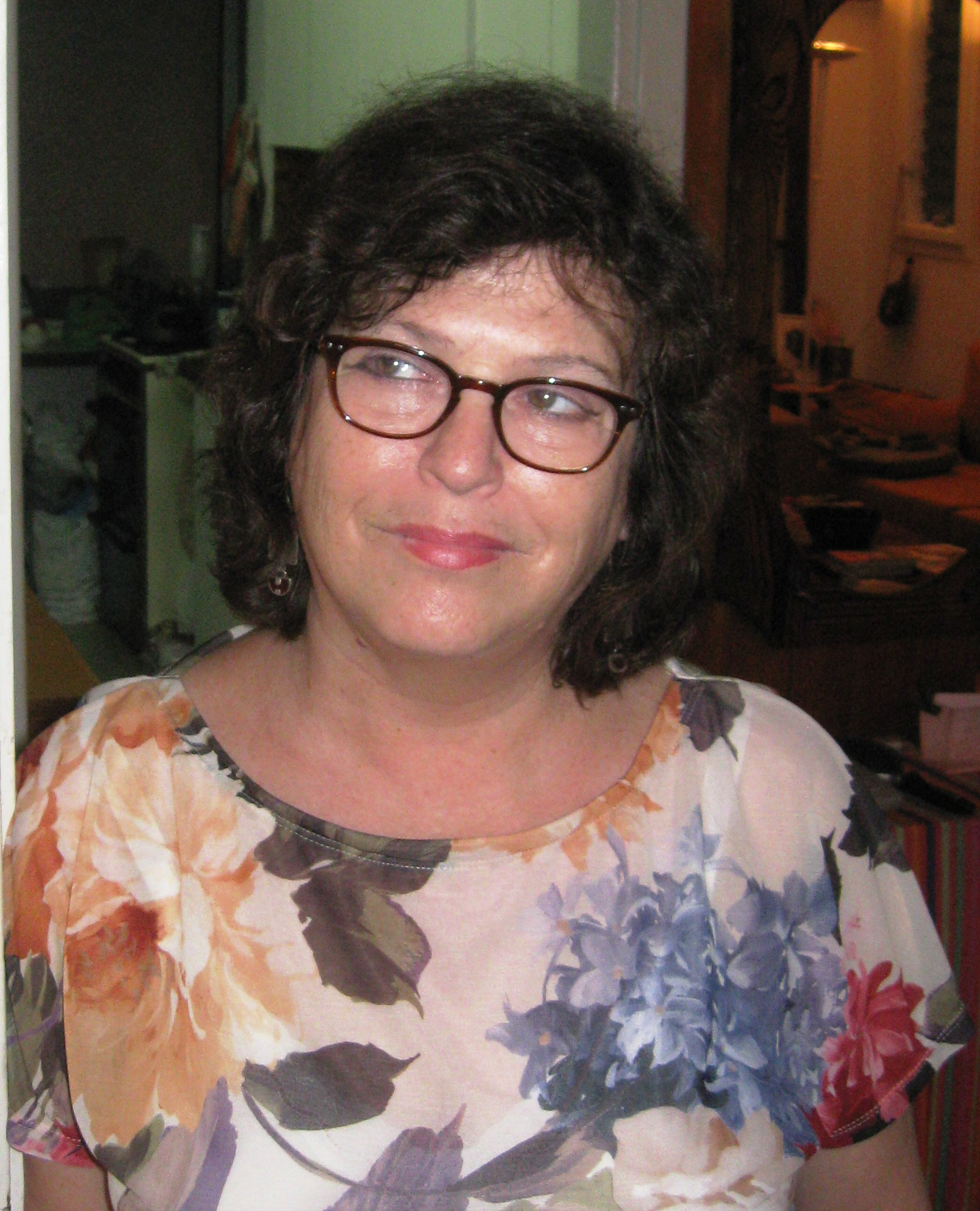
Maya Bejerano

Maya Bejerano (Hebrew: מאיה בז'רנו; born 1949 Kibbutz Eilon) is an Israeli poet.

She graduated from Bar-Ilan University with a B.A. in Literature and Philosophy, and from Hebrew University with an M.A. in Library Sciences. She won a 2010 ACUM literary award, and is a three-time recipient of the Prime Minister's Prize for Hebrew Literary Works (1986, 1994, 1996). In 2002 she was awarded the Bialik Prize.

== Works ==
- Bat Ya`ana (Ostrich), Achshav, 1978
- Ha-Hom Ve-Ha-Kor (The Heat and the Cold), Alef, 1981
- Ibud Netunim 52 (Data Processing 52), Alef, 1983
- Shirat ha-Tziporim (The Song of the Birds), Achshav, 1985
- Kol (Voice), Siman Kriah/Hakibbutz Hameuchad, 1987
- Retzef Ha-Shirim 1972-1986 (Selected Poems), Am Oved, 1987
- Leviatan (Whale), Hakibbutz Hameuchad, 1990
- Ha-Simla Ha-Kehula Ve-Sochen Ha-Bituach, (The Blue Dress and the Insurance Agent), stories & play, Keter, 1992
- Mizmorei Iyov (The Hymns of Job), Hakibbutz Hameuchad, 1993
- Ha-Perah Ha-Sakran (The Curious Flower) children, Yaron Golan, 1993
- Anaseh Laga`at Be-Tabur Bitni (Trying to Touch My Belly Button), Hakibbutz Hameuchad, 1998
- Tedarim (Frequencies), Hakibbutz Hameuchad, 2005
- Madrich Taiarim Ba-Ir Zara (A Tour Guide in a Foreign City) stories, Carmel, 2007
- Hitorarti be- Merkazu sel Ha- Alachsun (Waking at the Heart of the Diagonal), Hakibbutz Hameuchad, 2009

=== Books in English ===
- The Hymns of Job and Other Poems, Translator Tsipi Keller, Rochester, NY: BOA Editions, 2008, ISBN 978-1-934414-16-3

=== Anthologies ===
- Tsipi Keller, ed. (2008). Poets on the edge: an anthology of contemporary Hebrew poetry. SUNY Press. ISBN 978-0-7914-7686-4.
- Miriyam Glazer, ed. (2000). Dreaming the actual: contemporary fiction and poetry by Israeli women writers. SUNY Press. ISBN 978-0-7914-4558-7.
