= Hebrew literature =

Literature in the Hebrew Language

Hebrew literature consists of ancient, medieval, and modern writings in the Hebrew language. It is one of the primary forms of Jewish literature, though there have been cases of literature written in Hebrew by non-Jews, mostly among the Arab citizens of Israel. Hebrew literature was produced in many different parts of the world throughout the medieval and modern eras, while contemporary Hebrew literature is largely Israeli literature. In 1966, Agnon won the Nobel Prize for Literature for novels and short stories that employ a unique blend of biblical, Talmudic and modern Hebrew, making him the first Hebrew writer to receive this award.

There have been many bibliographies recording Hebrew books and authors, one of the most comprehensive being The Bibliography of the Hebrew Book 1473-1960, a bibliography of all printed Hebrew books published before 1960 which lists some 12,000 authors and 9000 titles.

== Ancient era ==
Literature in Hebrew begins with the oral literature of the Leshon HaKodesh (לְשׁוֹן הַקֹּדֶשׁ), "The Holy Language", since ancient times and with the teachings of Abraham, the first of the biblical patriarchs of Israel, c. 2000 BCE. Beyond comparison, the most important work of ancient Hebrew literature is the Hebrew Bible (Tanakh).

The Mishna, compiled around 200 CE, is the primary rabbinic codification of laws as derived from the Torah. It was written in Mishnaic Hebrew, but the major commentary on it, the Gemara, was largely written in Aramaic. Many works of classical midrash were written in Hebrew.

== Medieval era ==
During the medieval period, the majority of Jewish and Hebrew literature was composed in Islamic North Africa, Spain, Palestine, and the Middle East. Many works of medieval philosophical literature, such as Maimonides' Guide to the Perplexed and The Kuzari, as well as many works of fiction, were written in Judeo-Arabic and form part of Judeo-Arabic literature. Works of rabbinic literature were more often written in Hebrew, including: Torah commentaries by Abraham ibn Ezra, Rashi and others; codifications of Jewish law, such as Maimonides' Mishneh Torah, the Arba'ah Turim, and the Shulchan Aruch; and works of Musar literature (didactic ethical literature) such as Bahya ibn Paquda's Chovot ha-Levavot (The Duties of the Heart). One work of fiction which was written in Hebrew was the "Fox Fables" by Berechiah ben Natronai ha-Nakdan, Hebrew fables which resemble Aesop's Fables.

Much medieval Jewish poetry was written in Hebrew, including liturgical piyyutim in Palestine in the seventh and eighth centuries by Yose ben Yose, Yannai, and Eleazar Kalir. These poems were added to the Hebrew-language liturgy. This liturgy was compiled in book form as "the siddur" by rabbis including Amram Gaon and Saadia Gaon. Later Spanish, Provençal, and Italian poets wrote both religious and secular poems; particularly prominent poets were Solomon ibn Gabirol, Yehuda Halevi, and Yehuda al-Harizi. Most were also active in translating Jewish rabbinic and secular literature from Arabic into Hebrew.

Only one Hebrew poem by a woman is attested for the medieval period (and is both the first and the last for some centuries): composed by the wife of Dunash ben Labrat, it laments Dunash's departure into exile.

== Modern era ==
In addition to writing traditional rabbinic literature in Hebrew, modern Jews developed new forms of fiction, poetry, and essay-writing, which are typically called "Modern Hebrew Literature".

=== 18th century ===
By the early eighteenth century, Jewish literature was still dominated by Sephardic authors, often writing in Judeo-Arabic. Moses Hayyim Luzzatto's allegorical drama "La-Yesharim Tehillah" (1743) may be regarded as the first product of modern Hebrew literature. It has been referred to as "a poem that in its classic perfection of style is second only to the Bible". Luzzatto's pupil in Amsterdam, David Franco Mendes (1713–92), in his imitations of Jean Racine ("Gemul 'Atalyah") and of Metastasio ("Yehudit"), continued his master's work, though his works are not as respected as were Luzzatto's.

Later in the eighteenth century, the Haskalah (Jewish enlightenment) movement worked to achieve political emancipation for Jews in Europe, and European Jews gradually began to produce more literature in the mould of earlier Middle Eastern Jewish authors. Moses Mendelssohn's translation of the Hebrew Bible into German inspired interest in the Hebrew language that led to the founding of a quarterly review written in Hebrew. Other periodicals followed. Poetry by Naphtali Hirz Wessely such as "Shire Tif'eret," or "Mosiade," made Wessely, so to speak, poet laureate of the period.

=== 19th century ===
In nineteenth-century Galicia, poets, scholars, and popular writers who contributed to the dissemination of Hebrew and to the emancipation of the Jews of Galicia included:

- Joseph Perl (1773–1839), writer and educator who, in 1819, published Revealer of Secrets, the first Hebrew novel.
- Nachman Krochmal (1785–1840), a philosopher, theologian, and historian.
- Solomon Judah Loeb Rapoport (1790–1867), a rabbi, poet, and biographer
- Isaac Erter (1792–1841), a satirical poet whose collection of essays, "Ha-Tzofeh le-Bet Yisrael", is one of the purest works of modern Hebrew literature, attacking Hasidic superstitions and prejudices in a vigorous and classical style.
- Meir Halevy Letteris (1800–1871), a lyric poet also known for his adaption of Goethe's Faust into Hebrew.

In 19th century Amsterdam, Hebrew-language authors included the poet Samuel Molder (1789–1862). Prague became an active center for the Haskalah. One of the leading Haskalah writers there was Jehudah Loeb Jeiteles (1773–1838), author of witty epigrams ("Bene ha-Ne'urim") and criticism of Hasidism and superstition. In Hungary, Hebrew-language authors included Solomon Lewison of Moor (1789–1822), author of "Melitzat Yeshurun"; Gabriel Südfeld, a poet who was the father of Max Nordau; and the poet Simon Bacher. A notable Jewish author in Romania during the nineteenth century was the physician and writer Julius Barasch.

Italian Jews of the nineteenth-century who wrote in Hebrew included I. S. Reggio (1784–1854), Joseph Almanzi, Hayyim Salomon, Samuel Vita Lolli (1788–1843). Another figure of note was Rachel Morpurgo (1790–1860), who was one of the few female writers in the Haskalah movement, and whose poems have been described as characterized by "religious piety and a mystic faith in Israel's future". The best known Italian writer was Samuel David Luzzatto (1800–65) was the first modern writer to introduce religious romanticism into Hebrew and to attack northern rationalism in the name of religious and national feeling.

Prominent Hebrew writers in the Russian Empire in the nineteenth century included:

- the poet and mathematician Jacob Eichenbaum (1796–1861)
- the Haskalah leader Isaac Baer Levinsohn
- Kalman Schulman (1826–1900), who introduced the romantic form into Hebrew
- the romantic poet Micah Joseph Lebensohn (1828–52)
- the Lithuanian author Mordecai Aaron Ginzburg, known as "the father of prose"
- Lithuanian poet Abraham Baer Lebensohn, known as the "father of poetry", whose poems "Shire Sefat Kodesh" were extraordinarily successful.
- Abraham Mapu (1808–1867), the creator of the Hebrew novel, whose historical romance "Ahabat Tziyyon" exercised an important influence on the development of Hebrew.

The poet Judah Leib Gordon, also known as "Leon Gordon" (1831–1892), was a well-known satirical poet who has been characterized as "an implacable enemy of the Rabbis".

=== 20th century ===
As Zionist settlement in Palestine intensified at the start of the twentieth century, Hebrew became the shared language of the various Jewish immigrant communities along with native Palestinian Jews of the Old Yishuv, who continued the literary traditions of earlier Sephardic and Arab-Jewish writers such as Maimonedes (Moshe ibn Maimoun) and al-Harizi. Eliezer Ben-Yehuda in particular worked to adapt Hebrew to the needs of the modern world, turning to Hebrew sources from all periods and locales to develop a language that went beyond the sacred and poetic and was capable of articulating the modern experience.

With the rise of the Zionist movement amongst Jews in Europe, Ashkenazi Jews embraced Hebrew literature and began to dominate it for the first time. The foundations of modern Israeli writing were laid by a group of literary pioneers from the Second Aliyah including Shmuel Yosef Agnon, Moshe Smilansky, Yosef Haim Brenner, David Shimoni and Jacob Fichman. Hayim Nahman Bialik (1873–1934) was one of the pioneers of modern Hebrew poets and came to be recognized as Israel's national poet. Bialik contributed significantly to the revival of the Hebrew language, which before his days existed primarily as an ancient, scholarly, or poetic tongue. Bialik, like other great literary figures from the early part of the 20th century such as Ahad Ha-Am and Tchernichovsky, spent his last years in Tel Aviv, and exerted a great influence on younger Hebrew writers; the impact of his work is evident throughout modern Hebrew literature.

In parallel, a number of Palestinian and Levantine Jewish writers were influenced by the resurgence of Hebrew literature, and adopted Hebrew for their writings. In contrast to the experiences of pioneers such as Bialik, who were Ashkenazi immigrants from Europe, the Levantine Jewish writers were educated in Arabic literary traditions, and thus they incorporated many Arabic, Sephardic, and vernacular Palestinian themes and linguistic elements in their writing. Novelist Yehuda Burla, born in Jerusalem in 1886, served in the Ottoman army, and later taught Hebrew and Arabic in Damascus. In 1961, he was awarded the Israel Prize, for literature. The novelist Yitzhaq Shami was a Palestinian Jewish native of Hebron, and his work—which was written from the perspective of both Arabic-speaking Jews and Muslim Palestinians—incorporated diverse Arabic, Sephardic, and Middle Eastern themes. Shami holds a relatively unique place in Hebrew literature, since his writing is also recognized as Palestinian literature; in 2004 Shami was recognized by the Palestinian Academic Society as one of the important Palestinian writers.

In 1966, Agnon won the Nobel Prize for Literature for novels and short stories that employ a unique blend of biblical, Talmudic and modern Hebrew. Literary translators into Modern Hebrew, most notably Leah Goldberg among others, also contributed a great deal to Israeli-Hebrew literature through bringing international literature and literary figures into Hebrew circles through translation. Goldberg herself was also noted for being a prolific writer and pioneer of Israeli children's literature as well.

== Contemporary era ==
A new generation of Hebrew writers emerged with the establishment of the State of Israel in 1948. This new generation included the novelists Aharon Megged, Nathan Shaham, and Moshe Shamir, and the poets Yehudah Amichai, Amir Gilboa, and Haim Gouri. The novels My Michael (1968) and Black Box (1987) by Amos Oz and The Lover (1977) and Mr. Mani (1990) by A. B. Yehoshua describe life in the new state. These works also explore topics such as the conflict between parents and children and the rejection of some once-sacred ideals of Judaism and Zionism. Many Hebrew writers in the late twentieth century dealt with the Holocaust, women's issues, and the conflict between Israelis and Arabs. Another topic was the tension between Jews of European origin, the Ashkenazim, and Jews of Middle Eastern and Mediterranean origin, the Mizrahim and Sephardim. In 1986, the Palestinian-Israeli author Anton Shammas published the Hebrew novel "Arabesques", marking a milestone with the first major work of Hebrew literature written by a non-Jewish Israeli. Shammas's novel has been translated into a number of foreign languages.

Modern Hebrew authors include Ruth Almog, Aharon Appelfeld, David Grossman, Amalia Kahana-Carmon, Etgar Keret, Savyon Liebrecht, Sami Michael, Yaakov Shabtai, Meir Shalev, and Zeruya Shalev. Contemporary Israeli authors whose works have been translated into other languages and attained international recognition are Ephraim Kishon, Yaakov Shabtai, A. B. Yehoshua, Amos Oz, Irit Linur, Etgar Keret and Yehoshua Sobol. Hebrew poets include David Avidan, Maya Bejerano, Erez Biton, Dan Pagis, Dalia Ravikovitch, Ronny Someck, Meir Wieseltier, and Yona Wallach. In the 2010s, thousands of new books are published in Hebrew each year, both translations from other languages and original works by Israeli authors.

== Bibliography ==
- Shea, William H. (2000). "Chronology of the Old Testament". In Freedman, David Noel; Myers, Allen C. (eds.). Eerdmans Dictionary of the Bible. Eerdmans. ISBN 9789053565032.
