= List of Hebrew-language poets =

This is a list of Hebrew-language poets (year links are to corresponding "[year] in poetry" article):

== Biblical ==
- Moses
- King David
- King Solomon
- Jeremiah

== Early Middle Ages ==
- Eleazar ha-Kalir
- Jose b. Jose
- Yannai

== Golden Age in Spain ==
- Joseph ibn Abitur
- Abraham Abulafia
- Meir Halevi Abulafia
- Todros ben Judah Halevi Abulafia
- Samuel he-Hasid
- Todros Abulafia
- Yehuda Alharizi (1190-1240)
- Judah Ben Samuel Halevi (born c. 1086)
- Dunash ben Labrat (10th century)
- Santob De Carrion (late 14th century), also a proverb writer
- Abraham ibn Ezra, also known as Abraham ben Meir ibn Ezra (1088-1167), known mainly for Biblical commentaries and grammar works
- Moses ibn Ezra (1070-1139)
- Solomon Ibn Gabirol (1021-1058)
- Isaac ibn Ghiyyat
- Solomon ibn Zakbel (fl. 12th century
- Yehuda Halevi
- Joseph Kimhi (1105-1170), born in Spain, he fled to Narbonne, Provence, where he became known as a grammarian, exegete, poet, and translator.
- Shmuel haNagid, also known as Samuel ibn Naghrela or Samuel Ha-Naggid (992-1055)
- Menahem ibn Saruq
- Joseph ben Jacob ibn Zaddik (died 1149)

== Medieval Germany ==
- Baruch of Worms (early 13th century), liturgical poet and commentator
- Meir ben Baruch, known as Ma'aram of Rothenburg (1215-1293), a Talmudist, Tosafist and liturgical poet
- Judah he-Hasid
- Eleazer ben Judah ben Kalonymus of Worms (1176-1238), a Talmudist, Cabalist, moralist, scientist and poet

== Medieval France ==
- David Hakohen (late 13th century), composer of piyyutim from Avignon
- Isaac Gorni (late 13th century), troubadour from Aire-sur-l'Adour
- Jedaiah ben Abraham Bedersi (1270-1340), poet, philosopher and physician born in Béziers
- Joseph ben Isaac Bekor Shor (12th century), Tosafist, exegete and poet from Orléans

== Safed Cabalists ==
- Solomon Alkabetz (16th century)
- Israel ben Moses Najara (c. 1555-c. 1625)

== Italian Renaissance ==
- Deborah Ascarelli (17th century)
- Immanuel Frances
- Immanuel the Roman also known as Immanuel ben Solomon and Immanuel of Rome (1270-1330), a satirical poet and scholar
- Daniel ben Judah (late 14th century), liturgical poet
- Moses Judah Abbas (17th century)
- Moshe Chaim Luzzatto, also known as Moses Hayyim Luzzatto (1707-1747)
- Judah Leone Modena, also known as: Leon Modena or Yehudah Aryeh Mi-modena (1571-1648), a rabbi, orator, scholar, teacher and poet
- Sara Copia Sullam (died 1641)

== North Africa and Yemen ==
- Shalom Shabazi
- David Buzaglo

== Jewish Enlightenment (Haskalah) ==
- Isaac Erter (1792-1851) satirist and poet
- Judah Leib Gordon (1831-1892), also known as "Judah Löb ben Asher Gordon" or "Leon Gordon"
- Abraham Baer Gottlober (1811-1899)
- Abraham Dob Bär Lebensohn (1789-1878)
- Micah Joseph Lebensohn (1828-1852)
- Meir Halevi Letteris (1800-1871)
- Isaac Baer Levinsohn (1788-1860)
- Samuel David Luzzatto (1800-1865)
- Rahel Luzzatto Morpurgo (1790-1871)
- Süsskind Raschkow
- Constantin Shapiro (1841-1900)
- Hermann Wassertrilling
- Naphtali Hirz Wessely (1725-1805)
- Hannah Bluma Sultz

== Modern Hebrew ==
=== A ===
- Shimon Adaf (born 1972), Israeli poet and author
- Shmuel Yosef Agnon
- Ada Aharoni
- Lea Aini
- Nathan Alterman, also known as Natan Alterman (1910-1970), Israeli journalist, translator and popular poet
- Ronen Altman Kaydar (born 1972)
- Yehudah Amichai (1924-2000), Israeli poet and one of the first to write in colloquial Hebrew
- Aharon Amir
- Aharon Appelfeld
- Roy Arad
- Dan Armon
- David Avidan (1934–1995), Israeli poet, painter, filmmaker, publicist and playwright

=== B ===
- Simon Bacher
- Yocheved Bat-Miriam (1901–1979), German-born Israeli
- Menahem Ben (Braun)
- Itamar Ben Canaan
- Yakir Ben Moshe
- Avraham Ben-Yitzhak
- Reuven Ben-Yosef
- Fania Bergstein
- Haim Nachman Bialik (1873-1934)
- Ya'qub Bilbul
- Erez Biton

=== C ===
- Ya'akov Cahan (1881-1960)
- T. Carmi
- Miriam Chalfi (writing as Miriam Barukh)
- Rahel Chalfi
- Sami Shalom Chetrit
- Amichai Chasson

=== D ===
- Menahem Mendel Dolitzki (1858-1931)

=== E ===
- Dror Elimelech
- Israel Eliraz

=== F ===
- Jacob Fichman (1881-1958) a critic, essayist and poet
- Ezra Fleischer
- Simeon Samuel Frug (1860-1922), wrote in Russian, Yiddish and Hebrew

=== G ===
- Yehonatan Geffen
- Mordechai Geldman
- Amir Gilboa
- Simon Ginzburg (1890-1944)
- Uri Nissan Gnessin
- Haim Gouri
- Leah Goldberg (1911-1970), born in Lithuania, immigrated to Israel
- Uri Zvi Greenberg (Tur Malka)

=== H ===
- Simon Halkin
- Avigdor Hameiri (1886-1970), born in Carpato-Russ and immigrated to Israel in 1921; also a novelist
- Hedva Harekhavi
- Shulamith Hareven
- Paul Hartal
- Galit Hasan-Rokem
- Roy Hasan
- Haim Hazaz
- Haim Hefer
- Dalia Hertz
- Amira Hess
- Ayin Hillel
- Yair Hurvitz

=== I ===
- Naphtali Herz Imber (1856-1909), the author of Hatikvah ("The Hope"), called "the Jewish national hymn"

=== K ===
- Yehudit Kafri
- Ben Kalman, see Abraham Reisen
- Itzhak Katzenelson (anglicized: Isaac Katzenelson; 1886-1944), murdered in Auschwitz
- Admiel Kosman
- Abba Kovner

=== L ===
- Yitzhak Lamdan (1899-1954)
- Yitzhak Laor (born 1948) Israeli poet, author, and journalist
- Haim Lensky, also known as "Hayyim Lensky" (1905–1942 or 1943), Russian poet who wrote in Hebrew; imprisoned in Soviet labor camps after 1934, where he wrote most of his verse
- Giora Leshem
- Hezi Leskali
- Hanoch Levin
- Judah Lob Levin (1845-1925)
- Ephraim Lisitzky (1885-1962)

=== M ===
- Meir Leibush Malbim (1809-1879), notable Russian Bible commentator who wrote some poetry in Hebrew
- Salomon Mandelkern (1846-1902), Ukrainian poet and scholar; author of the Hebrew concordance, Hekal Hakodesh
- Mordecai Zvi Mane (1859-1886)
- Reda Mansour
- Salman Masalha
- Margalit Matitiahu
- Rivka Miriam
- Agi Mishol (born 1947), Hungarian-born Israeli poet

=== N ===
- Vaan Nguyen
- Tal Nitzán

=== O ===
- Amir Or
- Ofra Offer Oren

=== P ===
- Dan Pagis
- Alexander Penn
- Isaac Loeb Peretz (1851-1915), wrote in Hebrew and Yiddish
- Israel Pinkas
- Anda Pinkerfeld Amir
- Elisha Porat
- Daniel Preil (1911- )
- Gabriel Preil

=== R ===
- Rachel (Hebrew: רחל) in English, sometimes transcribed as "Ra'hel" or "Rahel", also known as "Rachel the poetess" (Hebrew: רחל המשוררת), pen name of Rachel Bluwstein Sela (1890–1931), poet who immigrated to Palestine in 1909
- Yonatan Ratosh
- Dahlia Ravikovitch
- Janice Rebibo
- Abraham Regelson
- Abraham Reisen (1870-1953), Russian native who immigrated to the United States; prolific poet and prose writer; pen name: Ben Kalman
- Tuvya Ruebner

=== S ===
- Rami Saari
- Yossi Sarid
- Zalman Shneur (1887-1959), novelist and poet
- A. A. Schwartz (1846-1931)
- Amir Segal
- Aharon Shabtai
- Yaakov Shabtai
- Amnon Shamossh
- Zalman Shazar
- Naomi Shemer
- David Shimonowitz, also known as "David Shimoni" (1886-1956)
- Abraham Shlonsky
- Simha Siani
- Tal Slutzker
- Ronny Someck
- Jacob Steinberg (1887-1948)
- Hannah Szenes

=== T ===
- Shaul Tchernichovsky, also known as Saul Tchernihowsky* (1875-1943)
- Yoram Taharlev, (1938-present)
- Benjamin Tene

=== V ===
- David Vogel

=== W ===
- Yona Wallach
- Meir Wieseltier

=== Y ===
- Zvi Yair
- Miriam Yalan-Shteklis
- Avoth Yeshurun
- Natan Yonatan

=== Z ===
- Nathan Zach
- Nurit Zarchi
- Zelda
- Eliezer Zvi Zweifel, also a Russian scholar, commentator and defender of Hassidism
- Stephan Zweig, (1836-1913), wrote in Hebrew and Yiddish
- Eliakum Zunser, (1881-1942), born in Vienna; also a biographer and dramatist

== See also ==
- The Modern Hebrew Poem Itself
- List of Yiddish-language poets
