= The Modern Hebrew Poem Itself =

Hebrew poetry book

The Modern Hebrew Poem Itself is an anthology of modern Hebrew poetry, presented in the original language, with a transliteration into Roman script, a literal translation into English, and commentaries and explanations.

Two editions of this book have appeared so far:

- First edition, published in 1965 by Schocken Books. Edited by Stanley Burnshaw, T. Carmi, and Ezra Spicehandler. Twenty-four poets, 69 poems, 220 pages. Has no ISBN. Library of Congress number; 66-26731. Reprinted by Schocken in 1989. Reprinted by Harvard University Press in 1995.
- Second edition, published in 2003 by Wayne State University Press. Edited by Stanley Burnshaw, T. Carmi, Ariel Hirschfeld, and Ezra Spicehandler. Forty poets, 106 poems, 359 pages. ISBN 0-8143-2485-1

Poets included in both editions of the book

- Chaim Nachman Bialik
- Saul Tchernichovsky
- Jacob Fichman
- Avraham Ben Yitshak
- Jacob Steinberg
- Uri Zvi Greenberg
- Simon Halkin
- Avraham Shlonsky
- Yochebed Bat-Miriam
- Yonatan Ratosh
- Nathan Alterman
- Leah Goldberg
- Gabriel Preil
- Amir Gilboa
- Abba Kovner
- Tuvya Ruebner
- Haim Guri
- Yehuda Amichai
- T. Carmi
- Ayin Hillel
- Dan Pagis
- Nathan Zach
- Dalia Ravikovich

Poet included in the first edition but not in the second

- Avot Yeshurun

Poets included in the second but not the first edition

- Zelda
- Dalia Hertz
- David Avidan
- Israel Pinkas
- Erez Biton
- Hedva Harekhavi
- Meir Wieseltier
- Yair Hurvitz
- Yona Wallach
- Agi Mishol
- Yitzhak Laor
- Dan Armon
- Ramy Ditzanny
- Ronny Someck
- Hezi Leskali
- Amir Or
- Admiel Kosman
