= Gabriel Moked =

Israeli literary critic, editor and philosopher (1933–2026)

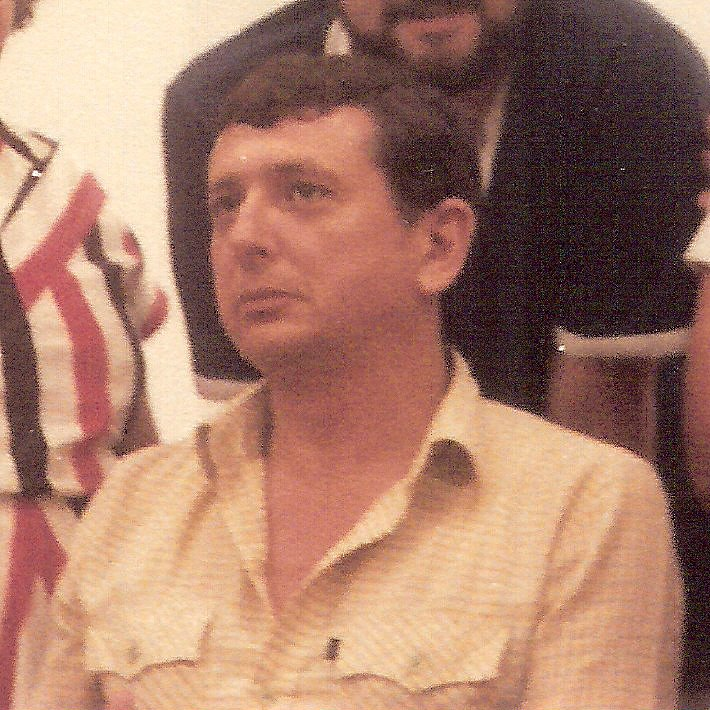
- Gabriel Moked, 1984
- Born: Gabriel Munvez; August 27, 1933; Warsaw, Second Polish Republic
- Died: May 29, 2026 (aged 92); Tel Aviv, Israel
- Resting place: Yarkon Cemetery
- Occupations: Literary critic, cultural critic, editor, writer, philosopher
- Years active: 1950–2026

Gabriel Moked (originally Gabriel Munvez; 27 August 1933 – 29 May 2026) was an Israeli literary and cultural critic, editor, philosopher, writer, and Holocaust survivor. He was best known as the long-time editor of the literary journal Achshav (Now), which he edited from 1957 onward. He was also a professor of philosophy at Ben-Gurion University of the Negev.

== Biography ==
Moked was born as Gabriel Munvez in Warsaw, Poland. His family traced its origins to Jews who had settled in Poland after the expulsion of Jews from Spain and Portugal at the end of the fifteenth century.

When World War II broke out, his family was imprisoned in the Warsaw Ghetto. Moked and his mother, Magdalena Teichner, escaped from the ghetto, while his father, a physician who remained there to assist the ghetto's inhabitants and members of the Warsaw Ghetto Uprising, was murdered by the Nazis. Moked and his mother survived the war while hiding under a Christian identity in Zakopane. In 1946 they immigrated to Mandatory Palestine. His Hebrew surname, Moked, was suggested by his friend, the poet David Avidan.

During the 1950s, Moked served as deputy editor to Alexander Penn, who edited the literary supplement of the newspaper Kol HaAm. At the end of the decade, Moked co-founded the literary journal Achshav together with Baruch Hefetz, Nathan Zach, and others.

Moked earned his doctorate at the University of Oxford. Based on his doctoral dissertation, he published Particles and Ideas, a study of the philosophy of the Irish philosopher George Berkeley. He later completed postdoctoral studies at Oxford as well. Throughout his academic career, he published numerous scholarly articles in Israel and abroad on a variety of philosophical topics.

Moked was Professor Emeritus of Philosophy at Ben-Gurion University of the Negev. He also taught in literature departments at the Hebrew University of Jerusalem and the University of Haifa.

As editor of Achshav, he played a major role in discovering and promoting many of the leading poets and writers of Israel's "Statehood Generation", including Yona Wallach, Meir Wieseltier, Yair Hurvitz, Yosef Mundi, Daphna Shchori, and Maya Bejerano. As a writer, he became known for his literary form of "variations" and "meta-variations".

From 2001 to 2004, Moked served as chairman of the Hebrew Writers Association in Israel.

In December 2006, he was indicted on charges related to the misuse of funds belonging to the association during his tenure as chairman. In September 2008, as part of a plea bargain, the indictment was amended to breach of trust in a corporation. He received a suspended sentence and was ordered to repay funds that he had received contrary to the association's regulations.

In later years, Moked experienced financial difficulties and publicly stated that he was at risk of eviction from his apartment in Tel Aviv.

Together with Professor Haim Marantz and Professor Karen Alkalay-Gut, Moked helped establish an English-language literary journal devoted to Israeli and Jewish writers in translation. Originally titled Tel Aviv Review, the publication was later renamed Jerusalem Review. Twelve issues were published.

== Personal life ==
Moked was married three times. During the 1960s he was married to the poet Ofra Shunit (Smolyanov), later known as the mother of Israeli musician Inbal Perlmutter. He later married Daniela Shami. During the 1970s he married Tova Rosen, with whom he had two sons.

In 1984, his mother, Magdalena Teichner, was murdered in her apartment in Tel Aviv during a robbery.

Moked lived in Tel Aviv for most of his life.

He died on 29 May 2026 at the age of 92 following a heart attack.

== Thought ==
Moked's literary and philosophical work began with the study of the writings of the Irish philosopher George Berkeley, particularly Berkeley's theories concerning the nature of matter and atoms.

His aesthetic views revolved around philosophical positions that he presented in his book Artistic Judgment: An Outline for a Moderate Objectivist Model in Aesthetics. In this work, he argued for a moderate form of objective critical judgment. According to Moked, such judgment should be based on the objective characteristics of a work of art that are dependent upon the medium in which it was created. Each artistic medium possesses a number of distinctive characteristics that can serve as the basis for evaluating artistic quality.

In addition to these theoretical writings, Moked published over the years a series of literary works known as "Variations" and later "Meta-Variations". These texts, usually ranging from a single page to longer essays, combine philosophical reflection with personal and experiential observations. Moked described them as:

Experimental prose in which I confront existential states of affairs directly. It is existentialist, perhaps neo-existentialist, writing.

Moked viewed his aesthetic and philosophical work as inseparable from his editorial practice. Through the many volumes of Achshav that he edited over the decades, he sought to demonstrate the principles of literary judgment that he had developed in his philosophical writings. In this sense, his philosophy has been described as a philosophy of critical editing.

=== Political views ===
In his political essays, published in Achshav and in the newspaper Haaretz, Moked frequently criticized both the Israeli right and the radical left.

He opposed nationalist and ideological extremism on the right while also criticizing what he regarded as dogmatism and intellectual rigidity among parts of the Israeli left. Throughout his career, he advocated an independent intellectual position that resisted identification with any political camp.

His essays often addressed questions of Israeli identity, Zionism, Jewish culture, secularism, and the relationship between literature and politics. He argued that cultural and intellectual life should remain independent of political orthodoxies and ideological conformity.

Moked was known for his polemical style and for engaging in public debates with writers, critics, academics, and political activists. His literary criticism frequently combined aesthetic evaluation with broader reflections on philosophy, society, and culture.

According to Moked, literature should not be judged solely according to political criteria. He maintained that artistic achievement possesses qualities that can be evaluated independently of political or ideological considerations, a position consistent with the moderate objectivist aesthetic theory he developed in his philosophical writings.

Throughout his career, he remained an influential and often controversial figure in Israeli literary culture, both as a critic and as an editor. His advocacy of writers such as Yona Wallach, Meir Wieseltier, Yair Hurvitz, and others contributed significantly to the development of modern Hebrew literature in the second half of the twentieth century.

== Books ==
- Harsh Words (Hebrew: Devarim Butim), Tel Aviv, 1953.
- Studies in Franz Kafka's "Metamorphosis": Chapters in the History of an Existential Experience (Hebrew: Iyunim be-Metamorphosis le-Franz Kafka), Tel Aviv, 1956.
- Five Variations (Hebrew: 5 Variations), Tel Aviv, 1971.
- Artistic Judgment: An Outline for a Moderate Objectivist Model in Aesthetics (Hebrew: Ha-Shifut ha-Amanuti: Mitveh le-Degem Objektivisti Matun be-Aestetika), Tel Aviv: Hebrew Writers Association, 1986.
- Particles and Ideas: Bishop Berkeley's Corpuscularian Philosophy (Oxford University Press, 1988).
- In Praise of Adiel Amzeh (Hebrew: Shivhei Adiel Amzeh), a study of Until Forever and Iddo and Enam by Shmuel Yosef Agnon, Schocken Books, 1989.
- Four Poets: On Yehuda Amichai, Nathan Zach, David Avidan and Yona Wallach (Hebrew: Arba'ah Meshorerim), published in the Open University of Israel lecture series, Ministry of Defense Publishing House, 2006.
- Eight Meta-Variations (Hebrew: 8 Meta-Variations), edited by Ran Yagil and Yehuda Vizan, Hamehadir Press, Tel Aviv, 2009.
- In Real Time (Hebrew: Bizman Amiti), Ktav Publishing House, 2011.
- Concepts of Judaism in the Works of Hayim Nahman Bialik, Shmuel Yosef Agnon and Uri Zvi Greenberg (Hebrew: Tfisot ha-Yahadut shel Bialik, Agnon ve-Uri Zvi Greenberg), Amda Hadasha, 2014.

== Books edited ==
As editor of the literary journal Achshav, Moked edited and promoted the work of numerous Israeli poets and writers. Among the books he edited were:

- Baganah ha-Tziburit by Yehuda Amichai (1959).
- Things (Hebrew: Dvarim) by Yona Wallach (1966).
- Slavion by Yair Hurvitz (1966).
- The Soloist (Hebrew: Ha-Solanit) by Lali Tsipi Michaeli (2013).
- Footnote (Hebrew: He'arat Shulayim) by Amir Sommer (2017).
- Prologue by Yoav Gilboa (2018).
- Poems for Louis (Hebrew: Shirim le-Louis) by Yair Hurvitz (2018).
- Lehisha'en by Daniel Weil (2022).

== Film appearances ==
Moked appeared as a character in several film and documentary projects relating to modern Hebrew literature.

- In the 2014 biographical film Yona, which depicts the life of the poet Yona Wallach, Moked was portrayed by Israeli actor Shalom Michaelshwili.
- In 2019, filmmaker Shlomit Carmeli released the documentary film The Sword Man (Hebrew: Ish Ha-Herev), devoted to Moked's life, literary activity, and influence on Israeli culture.

== Legacy ==
Moked is regarded as one of the most influential literary editors and critics in modern Hebrew literature. Through his work as editor of Achshav, he played a major role in introducing and promoting many of the most significant voices of the generation that emerged after the establishment of the State of Israel.

His writings on aesthetics, philosophy, literary criticism, and culture contributed to debates concerning artistic judgment, modernism, existentialism, and the relationship between literature and society.

As both a critic and editor, Moked remained a prominent and controversial figure in Israeli intellectual life for more than six decades.

== Selected articles ==
- Gabriel Moked, "The Function of Literary Criticism in a Democratic Society", Achshav, various issues.
- Gabriel Moked, "Aesthetics and Objective Judgment", Iyyun, Vol. 35.
- Gabriel Moked, "Literature, Philosophy and Cultural Identity", Haaretz, selected essays.
- Gabriel Moked, "The Writer and Political Commitment", Achshav, selected essays.

== See also ==
- Achshav
- Nathan Zach
- David Avidan
- Yona Wallach
- Meir Wieseltier
- Yair Hurvitz
- Hebrew literature
- Israeli literature
- Literary criticism
- Aesthetics
