= Itamar =

Itamar may refer to:

- Ithamar, a Biblical figure
- Itamar (name), a Hebrew given name
- Itamar (Israeli settlement), an Israeli settlement in the West Bank
- Itamar (footballer, born 1950), Itamar Antônio Bellasalma, Brazilian football manager and former forward
- Itamar (footballer, born 1980), Itamar Batista da Silva, Brazilian football forward
