= Yael Feldman =

American literary critic

Yael S. Feldman (Hebrew: יעל פלדמן; née Keren-Or; born 1941) is an American cultural historian and literary critic. She is particularly known for her work in comparative literature and feminist Hebrew literary criticism. Feldman is known for her research on Hebrew culture, history of ideas, gender and cultural studies, and psychoanalytic criticism. She is currently the Abraham I. Katsh Professor Emerita of Hebrew Culture and Education in the Judaic Studies Department at New York University and an affiliated professor of Comparative Literature and Gender Studies. She is also a fellow of the American Academy for Jewish Research, and a visiting fellow at Wolfson College, Cambridge.

== Early life and education ==
Feldman earned her Bachelor of Arts degree in Hebrew literature and language and English literature from Tel Aviv University in 1967 and her Master of Arts degree in medieval Hebrew literature from Hebrew College in 1976. She later completed her Ph.D. in 1981 from Columbia University with a dissertation on the Hebrew-American poet Gabriel Preil, which became the subject of her first book, Modernism and Cultural Transfer: Gabriel Preil and the Tradition of Jewish Literary Bilingualism (1986). After earning her Ph.D., she completed postdoctoral study at the Columbia University Center for Psychoanalytic Training and Research.

== Career ==
Feldman has lectured and published internationally, and served as editor of both general and academic journals. She is recognized as a leading scholar in Israeli literary feminism, along with Anne Golomb Hoffman and Naomi Sokoloff. Feldman's book No Room of Their Own: Gender and Nation in Israeli Women's Fiction (1999) was the first book-length treatment devoted to Israeli women writers and written from a feminist perspective. The book was a finalist in the 2000 National Jewish Book Awards. Her fifth book, Glory and Agony: Isaac's Sacrifice and National Narrative, is the first book-length study of the ethos of national sacrifice in modern Hebrew culture, exploring the biblical and classical stories of potential and enacted sacrifice that have nourished myths of altruist heroism over the last century. This study was a finalist in the 2010 National Jewish Book Awards.

Feldman's scholarship has been supported by various grants and fellowships, including the National Endowment for the Humanities, Fulbright-Hays Program, Littauer Foundation, Centers for Advanced Jewish Studies at Oxford and PENN Universities, Lady Davis Fellowship at the Hebrew University of Jerusalem, and Yad Vashem International Holocaust Research Center. Feldman has also served as the Culture and Art Editor of Ha-do'ar, an American Hebrew Journal of long standing (1921–2005) for 17 years (1985–2002). She has also served on the editorial boards of the academic journals Prooftexts, Hebrew Studies, Contemporary Women's Writings, and Women in Judaism. In 1992 she founded the Discussion Group for Modern Hebrew Literature at the Modern Language Association of America and served as its first chair.

== Selected publications ==
=== Articles ===
The following is a selection of the more than 90 refereed journal articles and book chapters authored by Yael Feldman.

- “The Romantic Hebraism of Gabriel Preil.” Prooftexts: a Journal of Jewish Literary History. Vol. 2, No. 2, May 1982, pp. 147–162.
- "The Latent and the Manifest: Freudianism in A Guest for the Night". Prooftexts: a Journal of Jewish Literary History (Indiana University Press), Vol. 7, No. 1, Special Issue on S. Y. Agnon, January 1987, pp. 29–39
- "Zionism: Neurosis or Cure? The "Historical" Drama of Yehoshua Sobol", Prooftexts: a Journal of Jewish Literary History (Indiana University Press), Vol. 7, No. 2, May 1987, pp. 145-162
- "The Invention of Hebrew Prose: Modern Fiction and the Language of Realism" by Robert Alter. Modern Fiction Studies (The Johns Hopkins University Press), Vol. 36, No. 4, Winter 1990, pp. 692–693
- "Whose Story Is It, Anyway? Ideology and Psychology in the Representation of the Shoah in Israeli Literature" in Saul Friedländer (ed.), Probing the Limits of Representation: Nazism and the "Final Solution". Harvard University Press, 1992, pp. 223–239. ISBN 0-674-70766-4
- "Feminism under Siege: Israeli Women Writers" in Judith Reesa Baskin (ed.), Women of the Word: Jewish Women and Jewish Writing. Wayne State University Press, 1994, pp. 323–342. ISBN 0-8143-2423-1
- "Postcolonial Memory, Postmodern Intertextuality: Anton Shammas's Arabesques Revisited". PMLA, Vol. 114, No. 3 (May, 1999), pp. 373–389
- "From "The Madwoman in the Attic" to "The Women's Room": The American Roots of Israeli Feminism". Israel Studies, Vol. 5, No. 1, The Americanization of Israel, Spring 2000, pp. 266–286
- "From Essentialism to Constructivism? The Gender of Peace and War in Gilman, Woolf, Freud". Partial Answers: A Journal of Literature and History of Ideas, January 2004, pp. 113–145.
- "On the Cusp of Christianity: Virgin Sacrifice in Pseudo-Philo and Amos Oz". The Jewish Quarterly Review, Vol. 97, No. 3, Summer 2007, pp. 379–415.
- "Deconstructing the Biblical Sources in Israeli Theater: Yisurei Iyov by Hanoch Levin". AJS Review, 1987, 12, pp 251–277
- "The Land of Issac? From 'Glory of Akedah' to 'Issac's Fear'". Shma: A Journal of Jewish Ideas, September 2011, pp. 16–17.
- "Between Genesis and Sophocles: Biblical Psycho-politics in A. B. Yehoshua's Mr. Mani," History and Literature: New Readings of Jewish Texts in honor of Arnold Band, eds. William Cutter and David Jacobson, Brown UP, 2002, 451–464.
- "On the Cusp of Christianity: Virgin Sacrifice in Pseudo-Philo and Amos Oz." JQR, 97: 3 (Summer 2007): 379–415.
- "’Not as Sheep Led to Slaughter’?: On Trauma, Selective Memory, and the Making of Historical Consciousness" Jewish Social Studies (2013), 139–169.
- "Deliverance Denied: Isaac’s Sacrifice in Israeli Arts and Culture - a Jewish-Christian Exchange?" The Bible Retold, eds. Leneman and Walfish (2015), 85–117.
- "‘Flavius on Trial in Mandate Palestine, 1932-1945," in Josephus in Modern Jewish Culture, ed. Andrea Schatz; Giuseppe Veltri's series, Studies in Jewish History and Culture, Brill (2019), 309–329.
- "Women, Blacks, Jews: Overcoming Otherness -- the Impact of Beauvoir, Sartre, and Fanon on Israeli Gender Discourse," in Sartre, Jews, and the Other, Vidal Sassoon Studies in Antisemitism, Racism, and Prejudice, Vol. I, Manuela Consonni and Vivian Liska, eds., de Gruyter (2020), 252–270.

=== Books ===
- Modernism and Cultural Transfer: Gabriel Preil and the Tradition of Jewish Literary Bilingualism. (Cincinnati: Hebrew Union College Press 1986) ISBN 0-87820-409-1

- Polarity and Parallel: Semantic Patterns in the Medieval Hebrew Qasida (published in Hebrew as בין הקטבים לקו המשווה : שירת ימי־הביניים : תבניות סמאנטיות בשיר המורכב). Tel Aviv: Papyrus, 1987
- Teaching the Hebrew Bible as Literature in Translation, co-editor. New York: MLA Publications, 1989. ISBN 978-0-87352-523-7
- No Room of Their Own: Gender and Nation in Israeli Women's Fiction. New York: Columbia University Press, 1999. ISBN 0-231-11146-0

A National Jewish Book Award Finalist, 1999 [category: Women Studies].

- Published in Hebrew [translation by Michal Sapir] as ללא חדר משלהן: מגדר ולאומיות ביצירתן של סופרות ישראליות: עמליה כהנא כרמון,שולמית הראבן, שולמית לפיד, רות אלמוג, נתיבה בן-יהודה.

[Lelo heder mishelahen: Migdar uleumiut biyetziratan shel sofrot israeliyot, Tel Aviv: Hakibbutz Hameuhad, 2002]

Abraham Friedman Memorial Prize, 2003

- Glory and Agony: Isaac's Sacrifice and National Narrative. Stanford UP, California: Stanford University Press, 2010. ISBN 978-0-8047-5902-1

A National Jewish Book Award Finalist, 2010 [category: Scholarship]
