= Lali Tsipi Michaeli =

Israeli poet

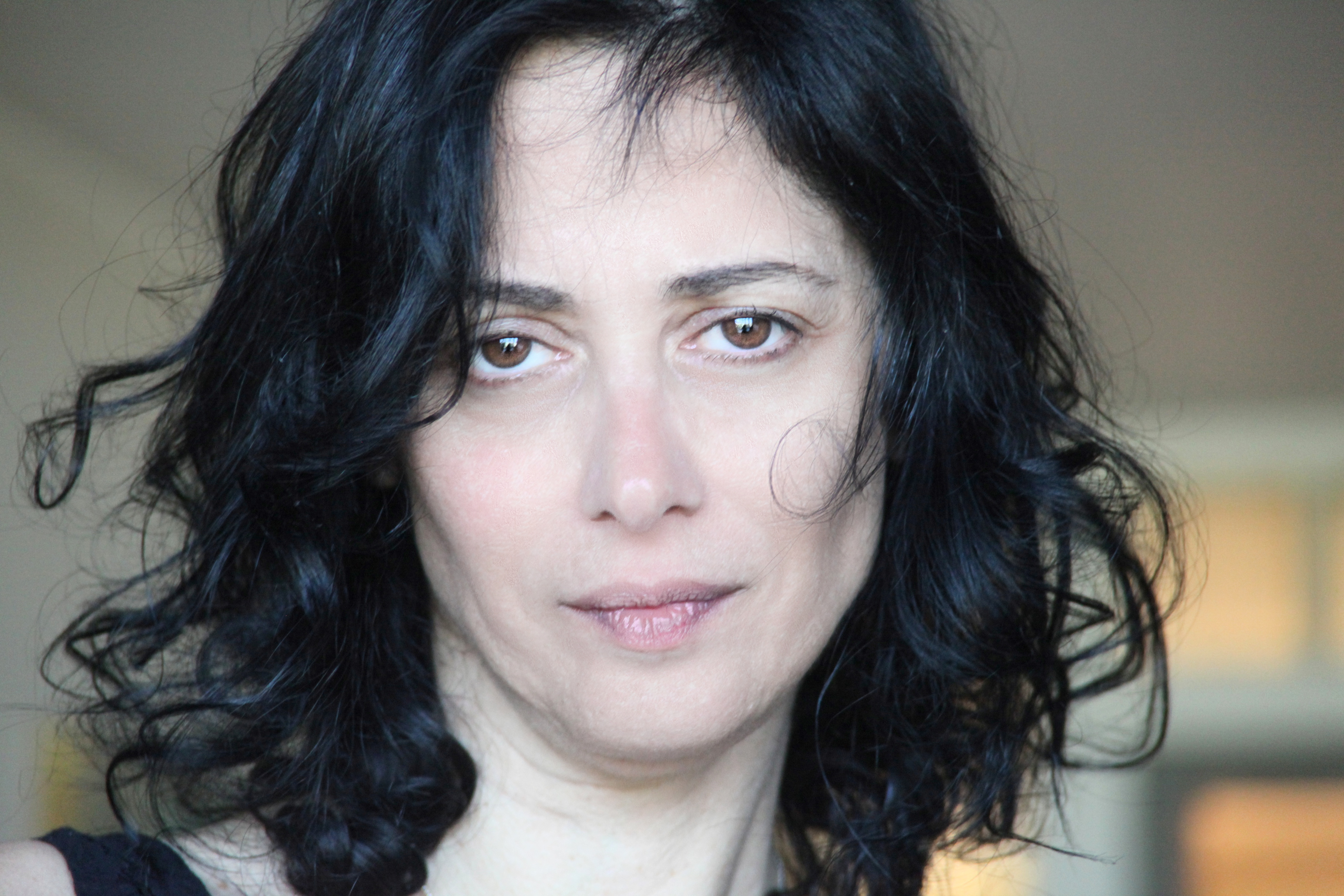
Lali Tsipi Michaeli

Lali Tsipi Michaeli (Hebrew: ללי ציפי מיכאלי; born 1964) is an Israeli poet.

== Biography ==
She was born in Georgia and immigrated to Israel with her family at the age of 7. She has a master's degree in comparative literature from Bar-Ilan University.

She published eight poetry books. Her books have been translated and published in the United States, Russia, Georgia, France, Romania, Turkey, Ukraine, Italy and India, among other countries. Her poems were published in Iton 77, Moznaim, Efes Shtaim, Mosaic, Achshav, Haaretz, Yedioth Ahronoth, Maariv, Sinn und Form, Times of Israel and Poetry International Web, as well as in online literary journals and international anthologies. She has participated in poetry festivals worldwide. Her poems were dramatized and performed in the Czech Republic on the stages of Brno and Prague by the Agadir Theater, 2025. 'My Mom', a poem by Michaeli, was launched to the moon in a time capsule in February 2024 as part of NASA's LUNAR CODEX.

In 2009–2010, she created Poetry Video Art posted on Ynet, showing her reading poetry to passersby. In 2018, she participated in a residency program for writers in New York. Over the years she taught a Hebrew language at Bar-Ilan University, Tel Aviv University and Ben-Gurion University of the Negev. She taught Hebrew language and poetry at Shanghai International Studies University.

She lives in Tel Aviv with the architect Zvi Pfeffer and has one son.

== Poetry ==
Prof. Gabriel Moked described her as an urban-erotic poet.

In an interview to Israeli daily Haaretz, Michaeli explained how she regards the role of poetry: “Hebrew poetry is like a broken record that is stuck and has stopped playing… there is a need for merging human existence with the desire to break through it in whatever way you can. The repetition of patterns is not a good recipe for poetry’s survival… I am really fascinated by poetry that shatters barriers. Poetry that doesn’t recycle itself. That doesn’t care what people will say. Poetry that is written from within itself. Without the boundaries of content or form. I don’t like crybaby poetry… I don’t like gushy poetry; it’s pathetic.”

Prof. Admiel Kosman wrote in a review of her book "The Mad House" (הבית המשוגע) in Iton 77: “One of the strongest books I have come across in the field of poetry is Lali Tsipi Michaeli’s The Mad House. My feeling as a reader was that in front of me there was a poet, mature and accurate in the sense that every word in her book was placed in its accurate spot where it had to be said. The poems were not written willingly, but out of a force that drove the poet to write, and to me this is the strongest sign for quality poetry… In this intense book, the poet sings the song of the shaky house of anyone looking at their own life (in this sense, the “house” is a metaphor for the life by which each one of us is trying to create a permanent hold of reality), even after all they desired has been given to them and they are ostensibly very happy in all possible senses – with an eye that almost breaks at the sight of the viewer – popping the question on the reason for that existence and whatever exists or does not exist beyond it.”

Jonathan Berg diagnoses a new poetic language in Michaeli's poetry and writes in Walla!: "Michaeli is very busy with the new: in the search for new ways to express and reflect reality, this is true both in the formal side and in the content related to the content of her poetry. Michaeli's poems are not" disciplined ", the basic order that leads them is movement of consciousness and search in language of expression to that Free movement".

Her book Papa corresponds with her deceased father. Poet and poetry reviewer Yotam Reuveny writes about this book in a review in the Israeli daily Haaretz: “Anyone who has lost a father would relate to the poems of Lali Tsipi Michaeli's elegy, Papa. The poems, collecting memories from various periods in the life of the father and thoughts of the daughter after his death, create a harsh picture of inconsolable loss… The whole book is written in this tone, the tone of a direct appeal to the dead father, to make him know what his living daughter is undergoing… This is a touching book, in which every poem seeks to be the final farewell to Papa, while becoming yet another expression of the dire need to still have him around.”

In 2011 she self-published the protest anthology Resistance (התנגדות) comprising poetry of 22 living and dead poets. In the introduction to the anthology she lays out her believing self in poetry and claims "Poetry in itself is a resistance…an alternative to our fact of being", and in an interview to the Israeli daily Haaretz, Michaeli sheds light about what she intended in the book and the manner in which she chose the poems to be included there: “The challenge was to find rebellious poetry that is also good poetry and which does not fall into the niche of protest poetry. In my opinion, poetry is an act of rebellion. Rebellion in that grey area that is imposed upon us as human beings. We are forced to survive and that is why poets who are very conscious of themselves and of their existence are also very fragile individuals. To a great extent, they are pushed into a paradoxical corner. They are both inside and outside life. When they are outside life, to a great extent, they endanger their very existence.”

== Books ==
- "Lali's Poems", שירי ללי (Eked, 1990)
- "Paint Me Ablaze", צייר אותי בוערת (Carmel, 2008)
- "Frontwoman", הסולנית (Ahshav, 2013)
- "Tractate of Faces", מסכת פנים (Ahshav, 2015)
- "The Mad House", הבית המשוגע (Even Hoshen, 2018)
- "PAPA", פאפא (Even Hoshen, 2019)
- "My Secret Lover, You", אהובי הסודי, אתה (Olam Hadash Books, 2022)
- "How Will I Light Up The World?", איך אאיר את העולם? (Black Dove Publishing House, 2023)
- "Hole In The Tongue", (חור בשפה, personal essay, Tarsat publishing house, Tel Aviv, (2026)

== Edited ==
- "Resistance", Protest Anthology, התנגדות (self-published, 2011)

== Michaeli's books translated into foreign languages ==
- "50 Poems", 50 ლექსი, translated into Georgian by Manana Dumbadze (Nodar Dumbadze Publishing House, Tbilisi, Georgia, 2018).
- "A Woman's Psalm", Psaume de femme, translated into French by Michel Eckhard Elial (Levant Publishing House, France, 2019).
- "The Mad House", Casa de Nebuni, translated into Rumanian by Carolina Lica and Lana-Valeria Dumitru (Editura Academiei Internationale Orient-Occident Publishing Press, Rumania, 2019).
- "The Mad House", La Casa Folle, translated into Italian by Sara Ferrari (Lieto Colle, Italy, 2019).
- "The Mad House", Божевільний ДІМ, translated into Ukrainian by Elena Mordovina (Каіала Publishing House, Kyiv, Ukraine, 2020).
- "The Mad House", Безумный дом, translated into Russian by Elena Mordovina (Издательский дом Владимира Коркунова Publishing House, Moscow, Russia, 2020)
- "The Mad House", Translated into English by Michael Simkin (Adelaide Books Publishing House, New York, USA, 2020).
- "The Mad House", पागल सदन, translated into Hindi by Rakesh Singh (Aabs Publishing House, Kolkata, India, 2020).
- "The Mad House", পাগল বাড়ি, translated into Bengali by Silpa Sanyal (Aabs Publishing House, Kolkata, India, 2020).
- "The Mad House", Deli Ev, translated into Turkish by Yeliz Altunel (Şiirden Yayıncılık Publishing House, Istanbul, Turkey, 2021).
- "The Mad House", 疯狂的房子, translated into Chinese by Shi Yonghao (The Earth Culture Press, China, 2021).
- "The Mad House", Савдойи уй, translated into Uzbek by Rahim Karim (Altaspera Publishing House, Canada & Uzbekistan, 2021).
- "The Mad House", Тентек уй, translated into Kyrgyz by Rahim Karim (Altaspera Publishing House, Canada & Kyrgyzstan, 2021).
- "Papa", पापा, translated into Hindi by Rakesh Singh Singh (Aabs Publishing House, Kolkata, India, 2021).
- "Papa", পাপা, translated into Bengali by Silpa Sanyal Singh (Aabs Publishing House, Kolkata, India, 2021).
- "Papa", Папа, translated into Russian by Elena Mordovina (St. Petersburg, Russia, 2021).
- "Papa", translated into English by Maayan Eitan (Adelaide Books Publishing House, New York, USA, 2021).
- Iran: Tehran,"Black Bird پرنده سیاه", Asare Bartar (آثار برتر), 2021, tr. Nima Niknam.
- Romanian: Bucarest, PAPA, Editura Academiei Internationale Orient-Occident Publishing Press, 2021, tr. Carolina Lica and Lana-Valeria Dumitru.
- Turkish: Istanbul, "İlya'ya Ağıtlar", Şiirden Yayıncılık Publishing House, 2022, tr. Yeliz Altunel.
- China: "你，我的秘密情人", ("My Secret Lover, You"), Translated into Chinese by Shi Yonghao, The Earth Culture Press, China, 2023).
- USA: "My Secret Lover, You", Translated into English by Gilad Padva (Adelaide Books Publishing House, New York, USA, 2023).
- Czech Republic: "Mešuge dům", (The Mad House, Translated into Czech by Michaela Rozov, Dauphin Publishing House, Prague, Czech Republic, 2023)
- Turkish: Istanbul, "Benim Gizli Aşığım", Şiirden Yayıncılık Publishing House, 2023, tr. Gizem Atlı, Metin Cengiz.
- USA: "How Will I Light Up The World?", Translated into English by Gilad Padva (Adelaide Books Publishing House, New York, USA, 2024).
- Sweden: "Ett poem om Gaza och två andra poesistycken", Translated into Swedish by G. Avraham (eBook, Linguistrator AB, 2026).
