= Itamar (name) =

Hebrew male given name

Itamar (Hebrew: אִיתָמָר, romanized: ʼĪṯāmār), also spelled Ithamar or Etamar, is a Hebrew masculine given name. The name means "isle of palms" in Hebrew, from the Hebrew i (Hebrew: אִי, romanized: 'î, lit. 'coast; isle') and tamar (Hebrew: תָּמָר, romanized: tāmār, lit. 'date palm'). The Yiddish form is Issamar, also spelled Isamar. No feminine form of the name exists in Hebrew or Yiddish but it is feminized in Portuguese and Spanish by adding an -a to the end of the name, making it Itamara or Ithamara. It is etymologically related to the feminine Hebrew name Tamar.

In Judaism, Ithamar is the youngest son of Aaron and the nephew of Moses. He is mentioned in the Book of Leviticus.

== People ==
- Ithamar, Bishop of Rochester (also Ythamar, fl. 7th century CE), English bishop
- Itamar Assumpção (1949–2003), Brazilian songwriter and composer
- Itamar Batista da Silva (born 1980), Brazilian football forward
- Itamar Bellasalma (born 1950), Brazilian footballer and manager
- Itamar Ben-Avi (1882–1943), Israeli journalist and pioneer of modern Hebrew
- Ithamar Ben-Canaan (born 1976), Israeli writer
- Itamar Ben-Gvir (born 1976), Israeli politician
- Itamar Biran (born 1998), Israeli alpine ski racer
- Itamar Borochov (born 1984), Israeli jazz trumpeter
- Itamar Einhorn (born 1997), Israeli Olympic cyclist
- Itamar Even-Zohar (born 1939) Israeli sociologist and linguist
- Itamar Franco (1930–2011), Brazilian politician and president
- Issamar Ginzberg (born 1980), Israeli business consultant and journalist
- Itamar Golan (born 1970), Israeli pianist
- Itamar Greenberg (born 2006), Israeli anti-war activist
- Ithamar Howell (1866–1920), American politician
- Ithamara Koorax (born 1965), Brazilian singer
- Itamar Marcus (born 1953), Israeli writer and political activist
- Itamar Marzel (born 1949), Israeli basketball player
- Itamar Moses (born 1977), American writer
- Itamar Nitzan (born 1987), Israeli footballer
- Itamar Noy (born 2001), Israeli footballer
- Itamar Rabinovich (born 1942), Israeli historian, diplomat and president of Tel Aviv University
- Isamar Rosenbaum (1886–1973), Nadvorna Rebbe
- Itamar Rosensweig, American rabbi
- Itamar Schülle (born 1967), Brazilian football manager
- Itamar Shimoni (born 1968), Israeli politician
- Itamar Simonson (born 1951) Professor of marketing at Stanford University
- Itamar Singer (1946–2012), Israeli historian
- Ithamar Sloan (1822–1898), American politician and lawyer
- Itamar Vieira (born 1979), Brazilian writer
- Itamar Zorman (born 1985), Israeli violinist

== See also ==
- Itamar, an Israeli settlement in the West Bank
