= Poem for Rent =

Nonprofit project for arts distribution founded in Israel

- Formation: October 2005; 20 years ago
- Purpose: Arts distribution
- Official language: Hebrew

Poem for rent in Qiryat Chaim, Israel

Poem for Rent is a nonprofit project for arts distribution founded in Israel. Poems on bulletin boards are posted in the same format as standard "house for rent" posts with several detachable tear-offs on the bottom. Instead of a telephone number, quotes from the poem are written on the tear-offs. This way, anyone who passes by can read the poem and pick a tear-off with a quote they liked from the poem.

== History ==
The first poems for rent were posted in Israel during October 2005. One of those was documented in the Hebrew creation site Tzura. Those were poems of famous Israeli poets such as Yehuda Amichai and Nathan Zach, as well as poems of the Polish poet, Nobel Prize winner, Wislawa Szymborska.

In 2006, the concept expanded to other types of arts, such as painting for rent and comics for rent. The project has also expanded geographically: poems for rent have appeared in Switzerland and The Netherlands. In its summer 2006 issue, the Dutch poetry magazine "Awater" dedicated an article to the project, titled "Wat Bezielt" (What Inspires).

== See also ==
- Culture of Israel
- Israeli literature
