= Miriam Barukh Chalfi =

Israeli poet and sculptor

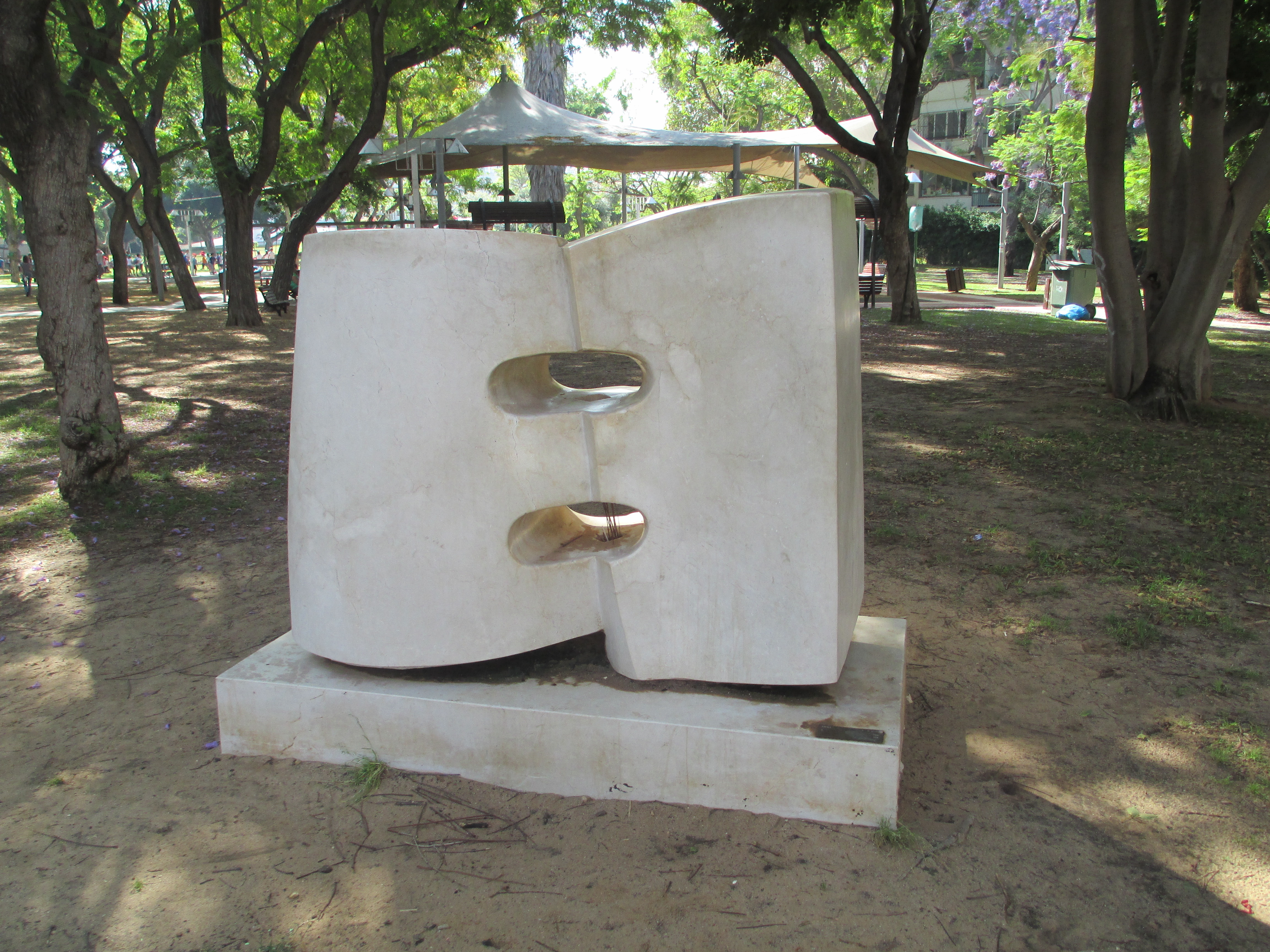
sculpture by Chalfi in Tel Aviv

Miriam Barukh Chalfi (Hebrew: מרים ברוך חלפי; c. 1917 – October 17, 2002) was an Israeli poet and sculptor.

== Biography ==
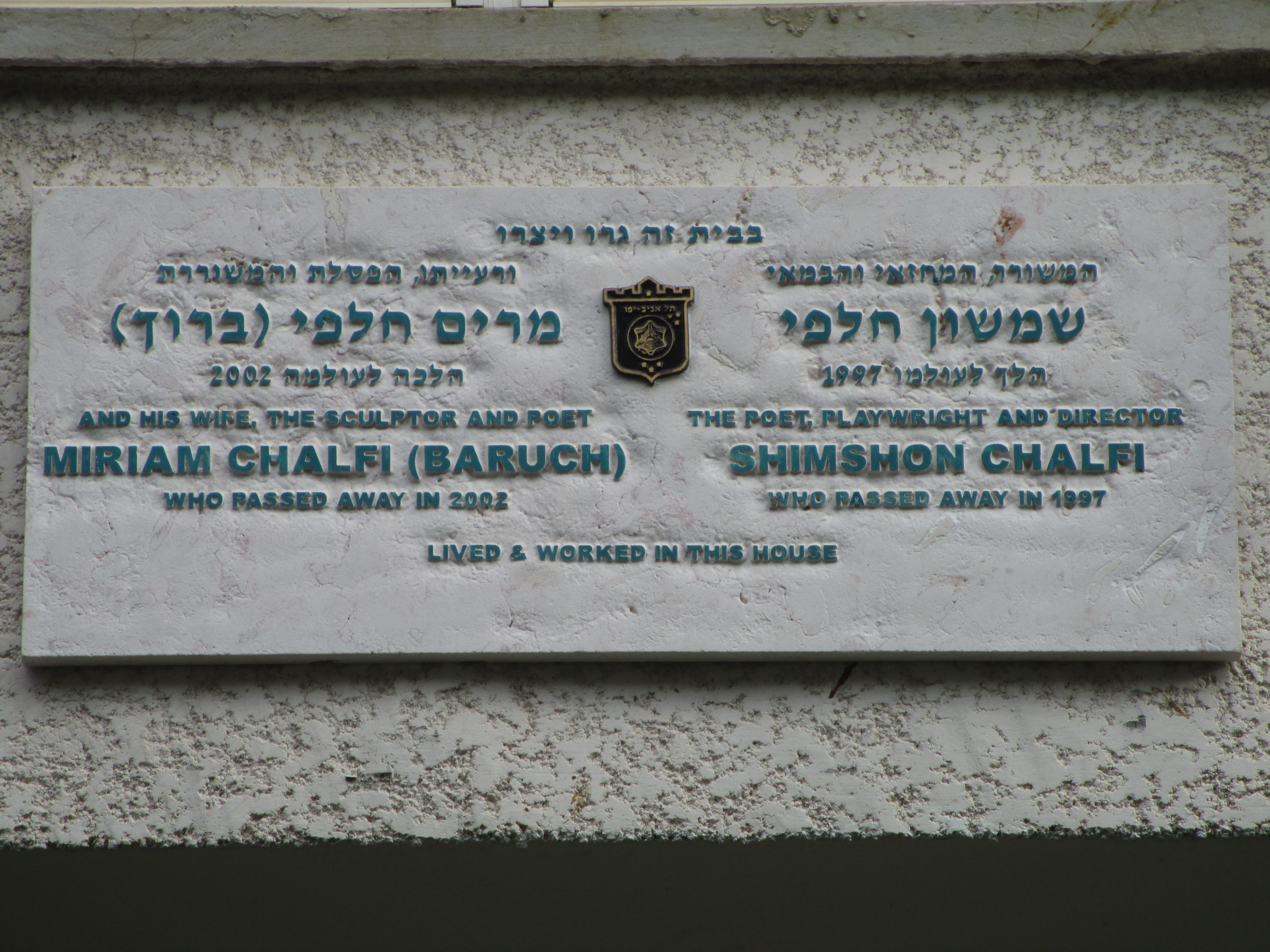
Memorial plaque in Tel Aviv

Miriam Chalfi (from the Sternbaum family) was born in Sokołów (Poland). Her father, Barukh, was a merchant. Her mother, Rachel was born initially into the Salzberg family. Chalfi grew up in a traditional, Zionist household. Her father was a Maskil and taught her Hebrew in her youth. In 1925, she moved to the Land of Israel with her father (though her mother had died in Poland by this point). She was accompanied by three brothers and one sister. She, with her family, lived in Tel Aviv. In Palestine she studied in a night high school, Gymnasia Humanista, and she studied in a course for kindergarten teachers. In her early and her teenage years, she worked various jobs in order to provide for her family and her brothers.

After her studies, she worked as a teacher and a kindergarten teacher in special education. In 1937, she married the poet and playwright Shimshon Chalfi. In 1952, the couple was sent to Mexico to teach in the Tarbut/Cultura school system wherein she established a Hebrew kindergarten. There, she completed sculptural studies in La Academía del Arte in Mexico City. When she returned to Israel, she continued in her sculptural studies with Rudi Lehmann and Dov Feigin.

Her daughter, Raquel Chalfi, is a poet and filmmaker.

She died in Tel Aviv in 2002.

== Works ==
Her works were exhibited in, among other exhibits, the exhibit "80 Years of Sculpture in Israel" in The Israel Museum. Chalfi published her first poems under the pen-name "Miriam Barukh". Not a soul—besides close family—knew her identity. She did not want her publicity as a sculptor to be understood through the perspectives of her poetry.

Her visual works, similar to her poetry, specialize in concentration as well as Tzimtzum, that is contraction. The artist Oziash Hofstetter wrote, "In her sculptures, an elegant celibacy emerges from the dimensions of her strength... Her works break through religious peaks. The language of her faithfulness... touches upon all of that which is in her heart—the hidden and the eternal."

Her first book, Ba-Tavekh (In the Inside) (בַּתָּוֶךְ), was well received in the literary community. The poet Yisrael Har wrote regarding this book: "Chalfi's poems are rare and sparkle in their individualism." David Wienfeld wrote of Chalfi, "Her poems are deep and amazingly focused." Hayim Pesah wrote: "She successfully brings in a spiritual universe—decorated, rich, and echoing through a tight framework of succinct poetry that knows well the secret of Tzimtzum.

In her second book, Kimmahon (Longing) (כִּמָּהוֹן) (Ha-Kibbutz Ha-m'uchad, 1999), Barukh revealed her identity in using her full name. Kimmahon was lauded by critics. The poet Admiel Kosman wrote, "This poetry is the poetry of life. She is like the footprints remaining in the sand of whoever passes by, and we merely contemplate that stranger's qualities in amazement."

== Sources ==
- Lexicon of Literature 2 |00690
- Haaretz, Raquel Chalfi, Culture & Literature: No Need; Rocheleh; Truly, No Need 08/10/08
- Haaretz, Erez Shvitzer Matters in Song, Longing to See Heaven 09/03/11
