= Poetry International Web =

International webzine and a poetry archive

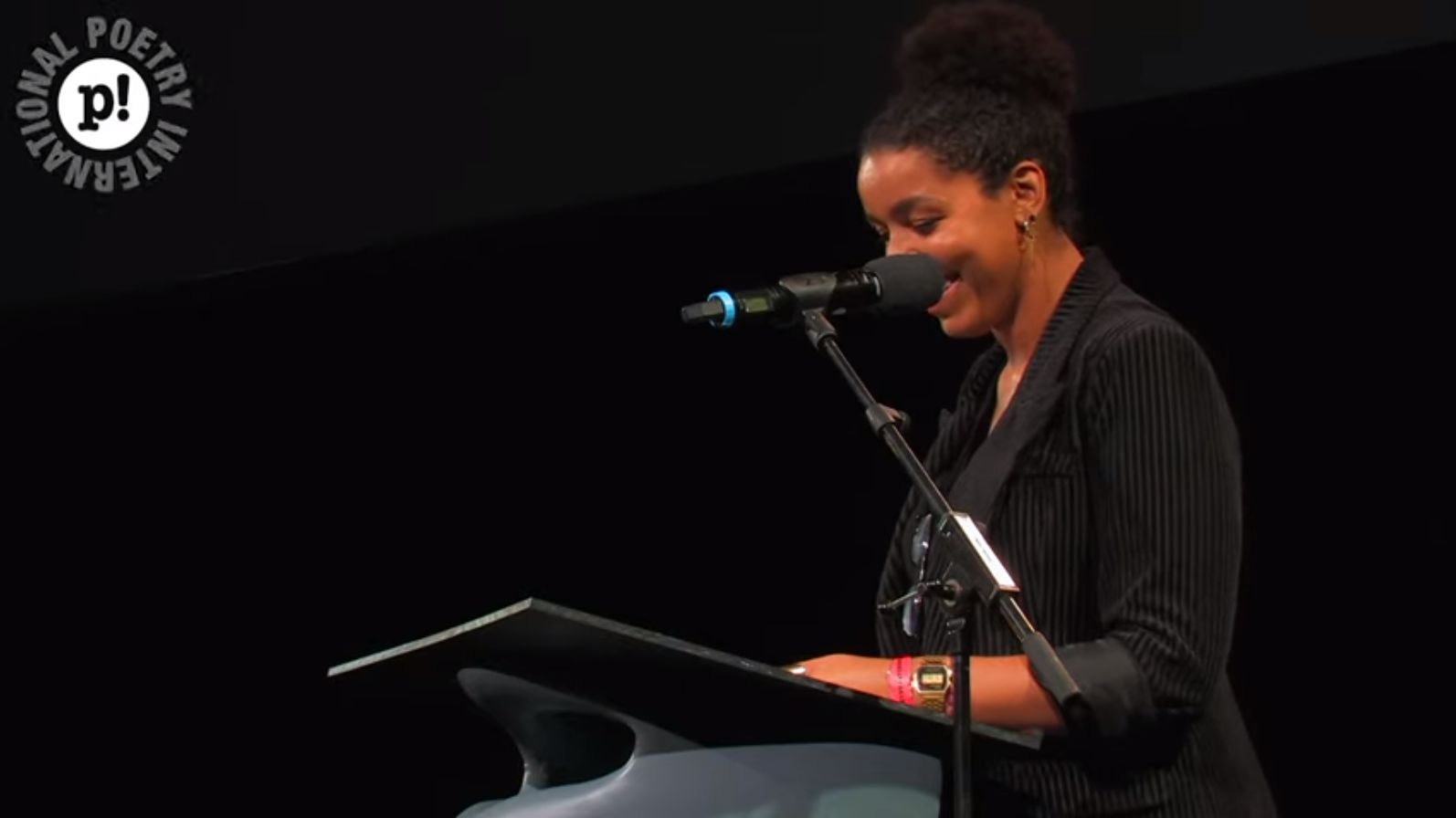
- Simone Atangana Bekono - IV. Recorded at the 50th Poetry International Festival Rotterdam, 2020.
- Owner: Poetry International Foundation
- Website: www.poetryinternational.org/pi/home
- Commercial: No
- Launched: 2002; 24 years ago

Poetry International Web is an international webzine and a poetry archive put together by a collective body of editors around the world and centrally edited in Rotterdam. It was originally launched in 2002. The site presents poetry from many countries in their original languages and in English translation. The website also publishes journalistic contributions such as essays and interviews on poets and poetry and provides annual media coverage of the Poetry International festival in Rotterdam.

It also features audio and video recordings of the poets reading their own work. Poets featured in the archives include John Ashbery, Elizabeth Bishop, Yves Bonnefoy, Joseph Brodsky, Kwame Dawes, Allen Ginsberg, Seamus Heaney, Judith Herzberg, Hiromi Ito, Lali Tsipi Michaeli, Dunya Mikhail, Pablo Neruda, Vikram Seth, Galsan Tschinag, Uljana Wolf and Mario Petrucci. Radio Netherlands recorded the programming of Poetry International from its inception in 1970.

Published poets are selected by Poetry International's national editors, based in their countries and often in collaboration with the major national poetry organization (such as the Poetry Foundation in the United States, Poetry East West in China, and the Poetry Society in the UK). Otherwise, the poets are published on the website because they have been invited as performers for the annual Poetry International Festival.

Poetry International Web was created as part of to the Poetry International Festival, which has been showcasing international poets annually in Rotterdam since 1970.

== Sources ==
- "About Us". Poetry International.
- Inge Ruigrok (September 2004). "Poetry International Web" (in Dutch). powerofculture.nl.
- "Poetry International". poetrysociety.org.
