= T. Carmi =

Israeli poet (1925–1994)

- ט. כרמי
- Born: December 31, 1925; New York City, United States
- Died: November 20, 1994 (aged 68); Jerusalem, Israel
- Education: Yeshiva University, Columbia University
- Occupations: Poet, editor, translator
- Writing career
- Language: Hebrew

T. Carmi (Hebrew: ט. כרמי; December 31, 1925 – November 20, 1994) was the literary pseudonym of Carmi Charny, an American-born Israeli poet.

== Biography ==
Carmi Charny was born in New York City. His father, Rabbi Bernard (Baruch) Charney, was the principal of Yeshiva of Central Queens, a Jewish day school. The family spoke Hebrew at home. Charny studied at Yeshiva University and Columbia University.

In 1946, he worked with orphan children in France whose parents were murdered in the Holocaust. He moved to Israel in 1948, just before the outbreak of the 1947–1949 Palestine war.

He died in 1994.

The first initial T is the English equivalent of the Hebrew letter tet, which Carmi adopted as it is the first letter of his original family name as written in Hebrew.

== Literary career ==
Carmi's books translated into English include Blemish and Dream (1951), There are no black Flowers (1953), The Brass Serpent (1961), Somebody Like You (1971), and At The Stone Of Losses (1983).

He was also translator of Shakespeare to Hebrew. His translations include Midsummer Night's Dream, Measure For Measure, Hamlet, Much Ado About Nothing and Othello. He co-edited The Modern Hebrew Poem Itself, together with Stanley Burnshaw and Ezra Spicehandler. His major critical work was as editor and translator of The Penguin book of Hebrew Verse, a chronological anthology that spans 3,000 years of written Hebrew poetry. He wrote the preface to a collection of Gabriel Preil's poems, Sunset Possibilities and Other Poems (1985).

T. Carmi was also the pseudonymous co-author jointly with Shoshana Heyman, "Kush" (short for the acronym of Carmi ve(and) Shoshana - in hebr.) of the classic Israeli children's book "Shmulikipod." A sick boy laments that he has no one for company but the donkeys on his pajamas. Relief comes in the form of a visit from a somewhat short-tempered hedgehog (Hebr. "kipod") named Shmulik. After a few messy misadventures that never leave the playpen, Shmulik flees; the book concludes, "And Shmulikipod walked, and walked, and walked, and walked ...."

== Awards and recognition ==
- In 1987, Carmi received a Guggenheim Fellowship award;
- In 1990, Carmi was a co-recipient (jointly with Pinchas Sadeh) of the Bialik Prize for literature.
- He has also received the Brenner Prize and the Shlonsky Prize.

== See also ==
- Hebrew literature
- List of Bialik Prize recipients
