= Ronen Altman Kaydar =

Israeli writer and poet

Ronen Elimelech Altman Kaydar
- רונן אלטמן קידר
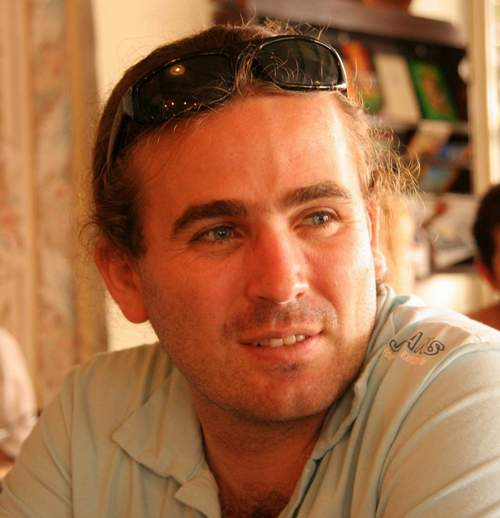
- Born: 1 October 1972 (age 53); Tel Aviv, Israel
- Education: Tel Aviv University
- Occupations: Writer; poet

Ronen Elimelech Altman Kaydar (Hebrew: רונן אלטמן קידר; born October 1, 1972) is an Israeli writer and poet.

The topics of his academic and artistic writing include science fiction, sexual identity, philosophy of science, history of science and more. After his marriage in 2003, he had added the surname "Kaydar".

== Biography ==
Altman Kaydar was born in Tel Aviv. Both of his parents were practicing scientists. In 1993 he completed his bachelor's degree in Mathematics and Physics in Tel Aviv University's excellence program in the academic reserve. After his release from the Israel Defense Forces, he studied at the Cohen institute for history and philosophy of the sciences and ideas in Tel Aviv University. His Master's thesis applied models for the spread of science on the case of Israeli genetics.

== Literary work ==
Altman Kaydar is a graduate of the Helicon poetry program (class of 1997), where his poems were first published. In 2000, his debut novel Chaos Butterflies was published by Shufra. The novel combines several plot lines regarding sexual identities in an American city at the end of the 20th century. Since then, Kaydar has frequently published poems in literary journals. His poems have been translated into English and Russian, and two of them were set to music by the Israeli composer Avner Dorman and performed at a music festival in Görlitz, Germany. His first poetry collection, Bite Marks (Helicon) was published in August 2007. He has also published translations of poetry in various journals and websites.

Since April 2009, Altman Kaydar has co-edited the web-based literary journal 'Zuta' with poet Anat Avissar. In 2009 he published the first Hebrew translations of poems by Mascha Kaleko (seven poems in Helicon, an Israeli poetry journal). Later that year, he edited his first poetry volume - Inbal Cahansky's The Wilds of Day - which was published in 2010. In addition, he translated the graphic novel 'Farm 54', by Galit seliktar and Gilad Seliktar from Hebrew to English; the translation was published by Fanfare in 2011.

== Other work ==
Altman Kaydar co-authored the script of the student film Make-up, produced in Temple University, directed by Inbar Gilboa and starring Lucy Dubinchik.
