= Yannai =

Yannai is both a given name and a surname. Notable people with the name include:

- Alexander Yannai (c. 130 BC–c. 76 BC), more commonly latinized in English as Alexander Jannaeus, second king of the Hasmonean Dynasty
- Michal Yannai (born 1972), Israeli actress
- Rabbi Yannai (fl. 3rd century), also transliterated as Rabbi Jannai, Jewish sage
- Yannai (Payetan) (fl. late fifth–early sixth century), Byzantine Galilee payyetan
