= Anda Pinkerfeld Amir =

Israeli poet and author (1902–1981)

- אנדה פינקרפלד-עמיר
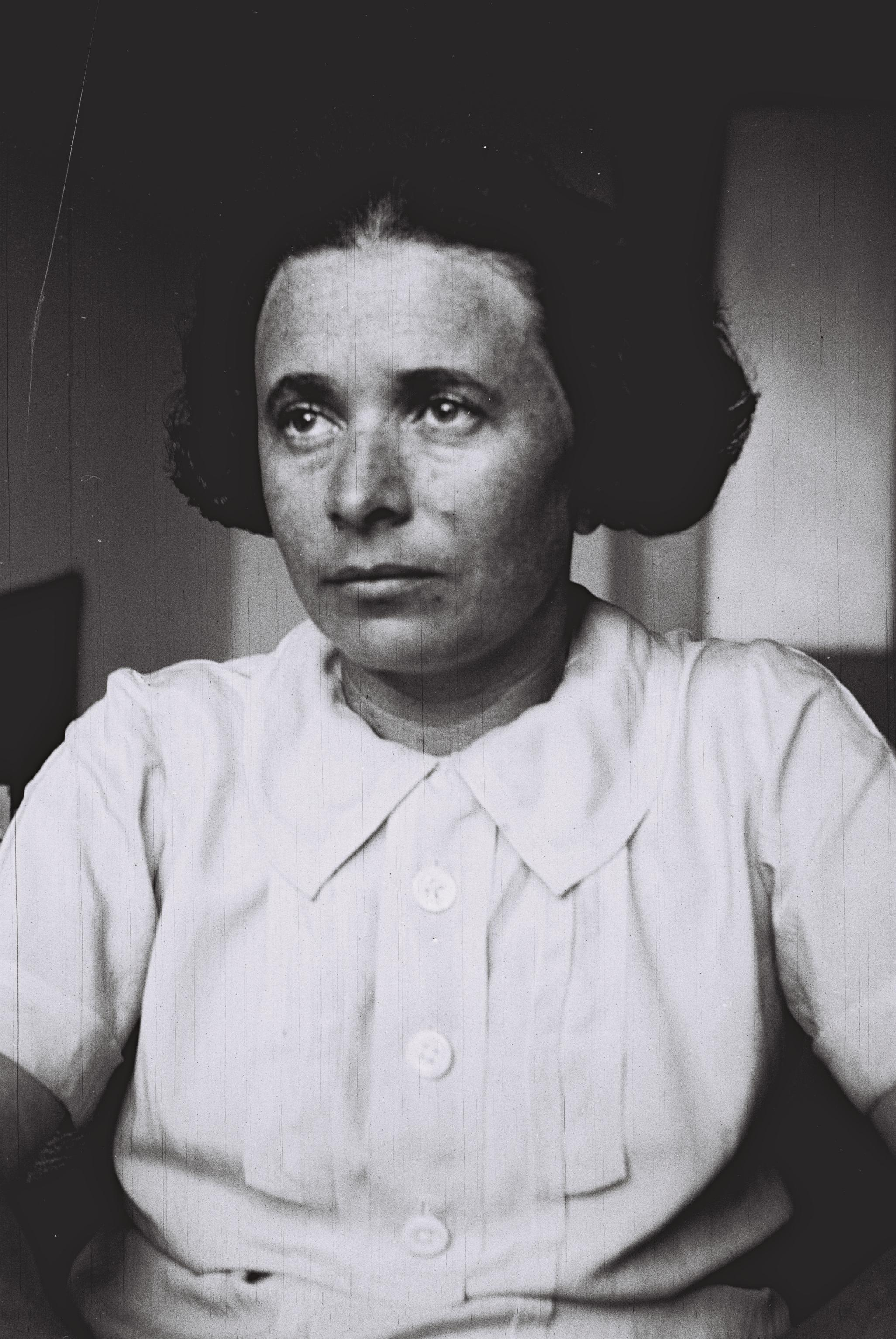
- Pinkerfeld Amir in 1936
- Born: 26 June 1902; Rzeszów, Poland
- Died: 27 March 1981 (aged 78); Israel
- Occupations: Poet, writer
- Writing career
- Notable awards: Bialik Prize (1936); Hayim Greenberg Prize (1971); Israel Prize for children's literature (1978)

Anda Pinkerfeld Amir (Hebrew: אנדה פינקרפלד-עמיר; 26 June 1902 – 27 March 1981) was an Israeli poet and writer. She is best remembered in Israel as a children's writer.

== Biography ==
Anda Pinkerfeld was born in Rzeszów, Poland in 1902. Her father worked as an architect for the Austro-Hungarian government. Her family was secular, and did not provide a Jewish education. After the Lwów pogrom (1918), she became involved with the Hashomer Hatzair movement and switched schools to the Jewish gymnasium in Lwów. In 1920 she left for Mandate Palestine with a Hashomer Hatzair group, but later returned to Lvov, for her BA.

During this time, she married Arieh Krampner-Amir, an agriculturalist. In 1924, the couple returned to Palestine. After living in Kibbutz Bet Alfa and Tel Aviv, they eventually settled in Kiryat Anavim and had a daughter, Zippor and a son, Amos.

In the aftermath of World War II, Pinkerfeld-Amir was sent to work in the Displaced Persons camps in Germany by the Jewish Agency. Pinkerfeld-Amir kept a diary of her experiences in Europe. She later worked in the archives of the Ministry of Defense, keeping records of soldiers who fell in the 1948 War of Independence.

Pinkerfeld-Amir died on 27 March 1981.

== Work ==
In her youth, Pinkerfeld-Amir wrote and published poetry in Polish. After immigrating to Palestine, she was influenced by Uri Zvi Greenberg and began writing in Hebrew. Her earliest work in Hebrew was published in 1928 under the pen name Bat-Hedva, meaning daughter of Hedva, her mother's Hebrew name.

She wrote many portrayals of biblical characters, but after her experiences in the camps in Germany, her work took on a more nationalistic tone. She was among the first writers to deal with the holocaust, when most writers avoided the subject.

Her most remembered work was written for children; in rhyme and lyrics, and more serious writing helping children deal with loss.

== Awards and honors ==
- In 1936, she received the Bialik Institute prize for her book of Children's poems.
- In 1971, she was awarded the Hayim Greenberg Prize for her poetry.
- In 1978, she received the Israel Prize, for children's literature.

== Publications ==
=== In Polish ===
- Song of Life, 1921

=== In Hebrew ===
- Whispering Days, 1929
- Al Anan Kevish, 1933
- Children's Poems, 1934
- Geisha Lian Tang Sharah, 1935
- Gittit, 1937
- From Time Immemorial: Ancient Figures, 1942
- Haruzim Alizim, 1944
- Duda'im ("Mandrakes"), 1945
- Gadish ("Grain Heap"): Poems, 1949
- Ahat: Poema, 1952
- Stars in the Bucket, 1957
- Shalom, Yeladim, 1965
- A Secret with My Older Brother
- Tehiyyot, 1976
- U-vekhol Zot, 1980
