= Partial Answers =

Partial Answers: Journal of Literature and the History of Ideas
- Discipline: Literature, History
- Language: English
- Edited by: Leona Toker

Publication details
- History: 2003–present
- Publisher: Johns Hopkins University Press (United States)
- Frequency: Biannually

Standard abbreviations
- ISO 4: Partial Answ.

Indexing
- ISSN: 1565-3668 (print); 1565-3668 (web)
- OCLC no.: 166882797

Links
- Journal homepage; Online access

Partial Answers: Journal of Literature and the History of Ideas is a peer-reviewed interdisciplinary academic journal that focuses on the study of literature and the history of ideas. The journal publishes articles on various national literatures including Hebrew, Yiddish, German, Russian, and (predominantly) English literature. It was named "Best New Journal of 2004" by the Council of Editors of Learned Journals.

The journal is published twice a year in January and June by the Johns Hopkins University Press. The current editor in chief is Leona Toker of the Hebrew University of Jerusalem.
