= Shem Tob ben Isaac Ardutiel =

14th-century Spanish Jew and Hebrew writer

Shem Tov ben Isaac Ardutiel (also Shem Tov ibn Isaac Ardutiel or Santob de Carrión) (c. 1290 – c. 1369) a 14th-century Spanish Jew, Hebrew writer and a translator of Arabic texts. His best known works include Proverbios morales.
