= Raquel Chalfi =

Israeli poet

- Native name: רחל חלפי
- Born: 1939 (age 86–87) Tel Aviv, Mandatory Palestine
- Occupation: Poet
- Language: Hebrew
- Notable awards: Bialik Prize 2006 Prize for Fine Literature; ACUM Prize 2015
- Spouse: Chaim Tadmon
- Children: Daniel
- Relatives: Avraham Chalfi

Raquel Chalfi (Hebrew: רחל חלפי) is an Israeli poet, filmmaker, and professor. In her career, she has published 21 volumes of poetry and book of prose. She worked at the Israeli Broadcasting Authority for much of her career. She is known for her experimental filmmaking style.

== Biography ==
Raquel (Rachel) Chalfi was born in Tel Aviv, where she lives and works. Her mother was the sculptor and poet Miriam Chalfi and her uncle was the poet and actor Avraham Chalfi. She completed her MA in English literature at the Hebrew University of Jerusalem, and later studied theater at University of California, Berkeley as well as film at the AFI Conservatory in Hollywood.

Chalfi is married to Chaim Tadmon, a broadcaster, writer and poet. Their son, Daniel, is an English teacher.

Chalfi has worked as a journalist and independent filmmaker and has taught film at Tel Aviv University. She has made documentaries as well as experimental films and has written plays for which she won awards, both in Israel and abroad.

Chalfi published her first book of poetry, Underwater and Other Poems, in 1975. Since then, she has published seven more collections of poetry.

== Awards and recognition ==
Chalfi is the recipient of several literary awards, including the following:

- Prime Minister's Prize for Hebrew Literary Works;
- Ashman Prize in 1999;
- 2006 Bialik Prize for literature (co-recipient with Ruth Almog and Uri Orlev).

== Poetry books published in Hebrew ==
- Underwater and Other Poems, Hakibbutz Hameuchad, 1975 [Shirim Tat-Yami`im Ve-Aherim]
- Free Fall, Marcus/Achshav, 1979 [Nefilah Hofshit]
- Chameleon or the Principle of Uncertainty, Hakibbutz Hameuchad, 1986 [Zikit O Ekron I Ha-Vada`ut]
- Matter, Hakibbutz Hameuchad, 1990 [Homer]
- Love of the Dragon, Hakibbutz Hameuchad, 1995 [Ahavat Ha-Drakon]
- Stowaway, Hakibbutz Hameuchad, 1999 [Nosa`at Semuyah]
- Solar Plexus: Poems 1975-1999, Hakibbutz Hameuchad, 2002 [Miklaat Ha-Shemesh]
- A Picture of a Father and his Daughter, Keshev, 2004 [Tmuna Shel Aba VeYalda]

== See also ==
- Hebrew literature
- List of Bialik Prize recipients
