= Tuvya Ruebner =

Israeli poet and translator (1924–2019)

- טוביה רובנר
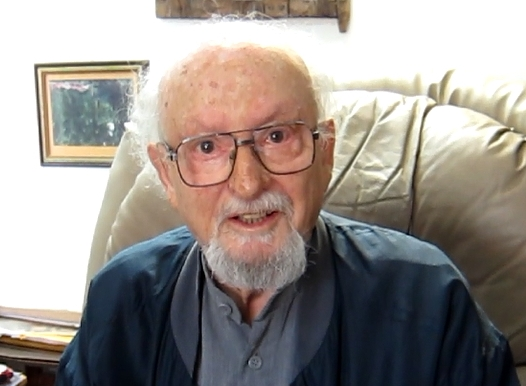
- Tuvya Ruebner in 2012
- Born: 30 January 1924; Pressburg, Slovakia
- Died: 29 July 2019 (aged 95)
- Occupations: Poet; Translator; Professor; Photographer
- Known for: Poetry in Hebrew and German; Translation of literature
- Awards: Anne Frank Prize (1957); Israel Prime Minister Award for Creative Writing (1975); Israel Prize for Poetry (2008); Theodor Kramer Prize (2008); Konrad Adenauer Stiftung Prize (2012)

Tuvya Ruebner (Hebrew: טוביה רובנר; 30 January 1924 – 29 July 2019) was an Israeli poet who wrote in Hebrew and German. He also translated poems - from Hebrew into German and from German into Hebrew. In addition, he was the editor of numerous literary books, a scholar, a teacher and a photographer. Ruebner was Emeritus Professor of German and Comparative Literature at Haifa University and Oranim College. The recipient of many literary awards in Israel, Germany and Austria, he was awarded the Israel Prize for Poetry in 2008 - the highest accolade the State of Israel bestows. The jury awarding that prize described Ruebner as "among the most important Hebrew poets", and his poetry as "restrained, polished and intellectual ... nourished by the ancient strata of Hebrew poetry and the best of the tradition of Central European poetry."

== Biography ==
Kurt Tobias Ruebner (later Tuyva Ruebner) was born in Pressburg – now Bratislava, in Slovakia. His parents were German speaking Jews. He attended the local school until 1939 when Slovakia, which had become a puppet state of Nazi Germany, banished Jewish pupils from schools. Consequently, Ruebner left school at the age of 15, thus - ending his formal education in the ninth grade. Acquiring coveted permission papers, Ruebner was able to leave Slovakia in 1941. Together with a group of youth, he made his way to Palestine, leaving his parents and sister behind. He was settled in Kibbutz Merchavia in northern Israel, where he lived for the rest of his life. His parents, his sister and other relatives were murdered in Auschwitz-Birkenau concentration camp in 1942.

In 1944 Ruebner married Ada Klein, also from Slovakia, with whom he had a daughter. In 1950, Ada was killed in a traffic accident, which also left Ruebner severely injured. Unable to be involved in agricultural labour, Ruebner was appointed librarian of the kibbutz. Sometime later he met the Israel-born pianist Galila Yisraeli and they married in 1953. The couple had two sons. In 1983, their youngest son, Moran, disappeared on a trip to Ecuador. All attempts to find him thus far have failed.

Between 1963 and 1966 the family lived in Switzerland where Ruebner served as Secretary General of the Swiss branch of the Jewish Agency. On his return in 1966, Ruebner began teaching - first at Oranim College, and later at Tel Aviv University as well as at Haifa University. In 1974 he was appointed Professor of German and Comparative Literature at Haifa University and Oranim College. Ruebner retired as Professor Emeritus at Haifa University in 1993. He died in 2019, aged 95.

== Literary career ==
Ruebner began writing poetry as an adolescent. He continued to write in his native German language during his early years in the kibbutz. While there, he was introduced to learned people such as Werner Kraft and Ludwig Strauss; who helped him a great deal. He was also introduced to the Israeli poet Leah Goldberg by the influential Avraham Shlonsky. Goldberg encouraged him to write in Hebrew and became a mentor and a close friend. Indeed, she was instrumental in publishing his first Hebrew poem, which appeared in the Davar newspaper in 1950.

Ruebner's first book of Hebrew poetry was published in 1957, and his first one in German in 1990. In 1955 he had already won the Anne Frank Prize for poetry. Many other awards followed - for example, The Theodore Kramer Prize in Austria, and the Israeli Prime Minister's Award for Creative work. All culminated in the award of the Israel Prize of Poetry in 2008.

Ruebner was also a leading translator. He translated works of Goethe, Friedrich Shlegel and Ludwig Strauss into Hebrew. He also translated the works of Shmuel Yosef Agnon and other poets into German. In addition, he engaged in editorial work - editing, among others, the poetry collections of Leah Goldberg. The Israel Prize Official Website lists all Ruebner's contributions up to 2008. Indeed, even later on and up until the very last months of his long life Ruebner sustained his involvement in literature - particularly in publishing poetry books. He wrote the phrase - “Words are whores.” in a 1983 poem about grief. He seemed to use the phrase to denote his anger for 'words' for their failure to preserve their referents .i.e. his lost son (As per a media).

Much of Ruebner's poetry deals with loss: the loss of his family in the Holocaust and the subsequent deaths of his first wife and, later, the disappearance of his son. Poet and Professor Rachel Tzvia Back, Ruebner's English-language translator, notes that Ruebner's poetry of "textual rupture and fragmentation" reflects the extreme rupture and fragmentation of his life. She explains that his "insistence on indeterminacy" in his writing, “reflects the indeterminacy of a new life built in the shadows of the old .”

"In the landscape of modern Hebrew poetry, Tuvia Ruebner holds a special and treasured place," writes Israeli editor and critic Israel Pinkas. "Ruebner's poetry adds new energy and clarity, artistry and sophistication."

== Critical acclaim ==
The Jury that awarded the Israel Prize in Poetry to Ruebner in 2008 noted that interest in his works had been shown not only in Israel but also abroad – notably in Germany, but also in the US, Slovakia and Sweden.

Literary critic and poet Shahar Bram writes that Ruebner's poetry is often his reaction to the visual arts - a technique referred to as ekphrasis. Ruebner, he writes, applies “the interdisciplinary theory of 'word and image', as two “sister arts”. Fellow poet and literature Professor Rafi Weichert writes that Ruebner's poetry deals with the experience of living with contradictions: “The whole volume of Ruebner’s creation ... is his way of “keeping his balance upon the abyss, the abyss of his biography.” In the Introduction to her 2014 translations of Ruebner's poems Poet and Professor of Literature Rachel Tsvia Back goes into some details. She guides readers to a number of aspects that she considers characteristic of Ruebner's writing. Lisa Katz and Shahar Bram's introduction to their translations includes examples of cultural influences that affected Ruebner's writing. In the Introduction to her later publication of Ruebner's poems, which she translated to English too, Rachel Tsvia Back offers an overview of Ruebner's long literary life. Having worked with him on the translation of those poems until a few months before his death, her account ends thus: "In the tradition of the Psalms, Ruebner's late poems marvel at the breadth given, at the day offered, and at the wonder of a word speaking from the page".

All in all, the Jury awarding Ruebner the Israel Prize of Poetry in 2008 refers to him thus: “In his poetry he struggles in a personal and unique way with the individual’s suffering of loss, with the holocaust of the Jews and the difficulties of an immigrant who has two homelands." The Jury concludes: “Looking back at over fifty years of creativity it is possible to delineate Tuvya Ruebner’s poetry as enthralling, continuously renewing itself – its contents and its form, poetry that, by sustaining conversions and upheavals, attests to its strength and its enduring dynamism.”

== Published works ==
Many of Ruebner's Hebrew poems were first published in literary supplements of Israeli papers. Published poetry books are the following:

=== Poetry books in Hebrew ===
- The Fire in the Stone. Sifriyat Po’alim Press. 1957.
- Poems Seeking Time. Sifriyat Po’alim Press. 1961.
- As Long As. Sifriyat Po’alim Press. 1967.
- Poems by Tuvia Ruebner. Ekked Press. 1970.
- Unreturnable. Sifriyat Po’alim Press. 1971.
- Midnight Sun. Sifriyat Po’alim Press. 1977.
- A Graven and a Molten Image. Hakibbutz Hame’uchad Press. 1982.
- And Hasteneth to His Place. Sifriyat Po’alim Press. 1990.
- Latter Days Poems. Keshev Press. 1999.
- Almost a Conversation. Keshev Press. 2002.
- Nasty Children’s Rhymes and Others. Tsiv’onim Press. 2004.
- Traces of Days: New & Selected Poems, 1957–2005. Keshev Press. 2005.
- Everything After It. Keshev Press. 2007.
- Belated Beauty. Keshev Press. 2009.
- Contradictory Poems. Even Hoshen Press. 2011.
- Last Ones: 2011–2012. Keshev Press. 2013.
- The Cross-Road. Keshev Press. 2015.
- Still Before. Kvar Series - Bialik Institute Press. 2017.
- From here To: Selected Poems. Hakibbutz Hame’uchad Press. 2018.
- Seventeen. Even Hoshen Press 2018.
- More No More. Kvar Series - Bialik Institute Press. 2019.

=== Poetry books in German ===
Ruebner was already writing poems in his mother tongue (German) when he arrived in Palestine in 1941. Although the poems in German were written first, they were published later than the ones written in Hebrew. The following is a selection of his poetry books in German:

- Selected Poems. Piper Press. 1990.
- Wuestenginster. Rimbaud Press. 1990.
- Granatapfel. Rimbaud Press. 1995.
- Rauchvöegel 1957–1997, Vol. 1. Rimbaud Press. 1998.
- Stein will fliesse. Rimbaud Press. 1999.
- Zypressenlicht 1957–1999, Vol. 2. Rimbaud Press. 2000.
- Wer hält diese Eile aus. Rimbaud Press. 2007.
- Spaetes Lob der Schoenheit. Rimbaud Press. 2010.
- Lichtschatten. Rimbaud Press. 2011.
- In Vorbereitung: Wunderbarer Whan. Rimbuad Press. 2013.
- Im halben Lich (2016). Rimbaud Press. 2016.

=== Autobiography ===
Ein langes kurzes Leben; Von Preßburg nach Merchavia. Rimbaud Press. 2004. (in German) ISBN 978-3890866642

A Short Long Life (2006). Keshev Press. 2006.(in Hebrew) ISBN 965-7089-82-4

=== Photography books ===
Everything that Came After; Poems and photographs. Keshev Press. 2007.

That Too My Eyes Have Seen. Keshev Press. 2007.

=== Translations ===
Ruebner's involvement in translating poetry from Hebrew to German as well as from German to Hebrew was considerable. Distinguished among these were his translations from Hebrew to German of stories by the eventual Nobel Prize winner J.S. Agnon. The Jury awarding Ruebner the Prize Israel of Poetry in 2008 noted that: ”His translations from German broadened the horizons of the Israeli reader, and his translations to German- especially of the writing of SJ Agnon – promoted Israeli literature in the world.”

The present article focuses on Translations of Ruebner's poetry to English

=== Ruebner’s Poetry in English Translation ===
Individual translations of Ruebner's Hebrew poems into English appeared in various literary forums from as early as 1974. However, full-fledged poetry books of such translations are a far more recent development. Rachel Tsvia Back's 2014 volume (see below) is the most extensive, but all three books listed below were published only at the beginning of the 21st century. These are the following:

Now at the Threshold: The Later Poems of Tuvia Ruebner. Introduced and translated from Hebrew by Rachel Tzvia Back. Hebrew Union College Press. 2020. Bilingual edition. ISBN 978-0-87820-186-0

Late Beauty: Tuvia Ruebner. Introduced and translated from Hebrew by Lisa Katz and Shahar Bram. Zephyr Press. 2017. ISBN 978-1-938890-11-6

In the Illuminated Dark: Selected Poems of Tuvia Ruebner. Introduced, translated from Hebrew and annotated by Rachel Tzvia Back. Hebrew Union College Press. 2014. Bilingual edition. ISBN 978-0-8782-0255-3

=== Performed works - readings and poems set to music ===
CDs of Ruebner reading his poems attached to his poetry books:

- Almost a Conversation. Keshev Press. 2002.
- Cross-Road. Keshev Press. 2015.
- Still Before. Bialik Institute Press. 2017.

=== Poems set to music by Moni Amerilio - with various performers ===
A Green Sun Again. Akum – CANTI1. 2007.

== Awards and recognition ==
=== Israel ===
- 1957 Anne Frank prize for poetry
- 1966 - ACUM Award for Poetry
- 1975 - Israel Prime Minister Award for Creative Writing
- 2007 - Jerusalem Prize for Poetry
- 2008 - Israel Prize for Poetry

=== Overseas ===
- 1981 - Steinberg Preis (Switzerland)
- 1987 - Ruebner was accepted as a corresponding member by the German Academy of Language and Poetry at Darmstadt, and the Mainz Academy of Science and literature
- 1994 - Christian Wagner Prize (Germany)
- 1999 - Jeannette Schocken Prize (Germany)
- 1999 - Paul Celan Translation Prize (Germany)
- 2002 - Jan Smrek Prize (Slovakia)
- 2008 - Theodor Kramer Prize (Austria)
- 2012 - Konrad Adenauer Stiftung Prize (Germany)

== See also ==
- The Modern Hebrew Poem Itself (2003), ISBN 0-8143-2485-1
- List of Israel Prize recipients www.education.gov.il/pras-Israel
- Poetry Translation Centre https://www.poetrytranslation.org
