= David Avidan =

Israeli poet (1934–1995)

- דוד אבידן
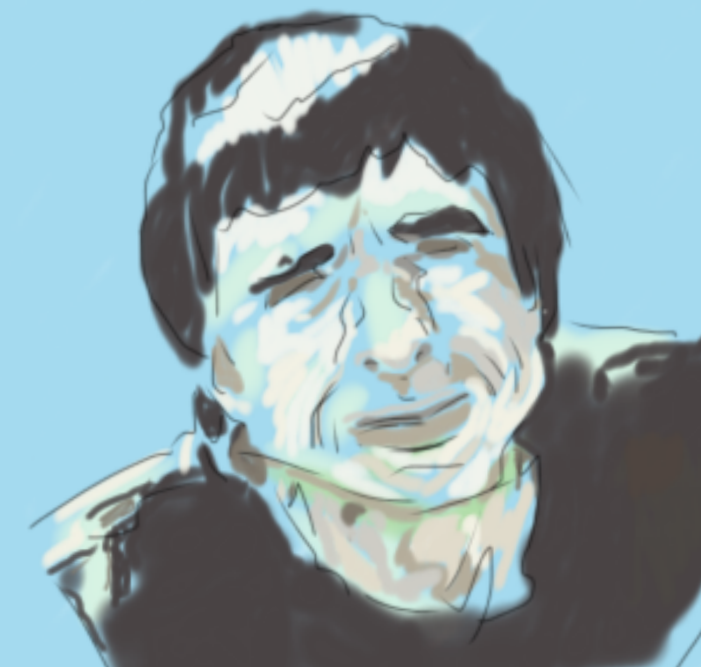
- "David Avidan", painting by Yael-Shahar Sarid, 1994
- Born: February 21, 1934; Tel Aviv, Palestine
- Died: May 11, 1995 (aged 61); Tel Aviv, Israel
- Education: Hebrew University of Jerusalem
- Occupations: Poet, painter, filmmaker, publicist, and playwright
- Awards: 1993 Bialik Prize for Hebrew literature

David Avidan (Hebrew: דוד אבידן; February 21, 1934 – May 11, 1995) was an Israeli "poet, painter, filmmaker, publicist, and playwright" (as he often put it). He wrote 20 published books of Hebrew poetry.

== Biography and literary career ==
He was born in Tel Aviv, Mandatory Palestine, and studied Literature and Philosophy while briefly studying at Hebrew University. He wrote mostly in Hebrew, and was an avant-garde artist throughout his life. He translated many of his own poems into English, and received several awards both as a poet and as a translator.

He studied at the ‘Shalva’ Gymnasium. From 1952 to 1954, he studied at the Hebrew University of Jerusalem. At a young age, he was diagnosed with asthma, which caused him choking attacks and accompanied him throughout his life. In 1952, he began publishing poems, mainly in the daily newspaper Kol HaAm, the publication of the Israeli Communist Party (Maki), and even joined the youth movement of the party, Banki (the Israeli Communist Youth Alliance). Gabriel Moked was the first to recognize his talent while they studied together at the gymnasium and supported his work and writing about it for many years. At the same time, Alexander Penn, the literary editor of Kol HaAm, was impressed by him and encouraged him. His early poems were deeply influenced by the pathos in Penn’s poetry and his translations of Mayakovsky, but even in these early works, there is a clear familiarity with the poems of Shlonsky, Alterman, and their generation.

Avidan became disillusioned with communism and committed poetry, and left Banki in 1953. For a short time afterward, he still published poems combining social pathos with existential anxiety in the HaMishmar newspaper of the Mapam party and in the weekly Bama’avak, but later he distanced himself from the political and aesthetic world of committed poetry. He was not popular with most critics or the general public throughout his life, often criticized as being egocentric, chauvinistic, and technocratic. His first book, Lipless Faucets (1954), was attacked by nearly all poetry critics; the first favorable review was by Gabriel Moked, editor of the literary quarterly Akhshav, who later became one of Avidan's closest friends.

From the late 1960s onward, Avidan showed considerable interest in technological innovations and sought to incorporate them into his work. He began using a dictaphone and, instead of writing his poems on paper, recorded them. His book My Electronic Psychiatrist (1974) includes eight conversations between Avidan and ELIZA, Joseph Weizenbaum’s computer program, a parodic simulation of a psychotherapist. The back cover of his book Spy Satellite Transmissions (1978) notes: “The vast majority of the components of the new book are transcriptions of handheld dictaphone recordings, which Avidan has, over the past four years, turned into a personal creative tool.”

By the early 1990s he could scarcely make a living, and his mental condition had deteriorated. Avidan died in Tel Aviv, the city which had played a central role in his life, and was, in many ways, the center of his creation. Alongside the literary persona, Avidan developed a real-life character that was somewhat a continuation of his poetic persona. He inherited from the Futurists the rejection of the modest poet figure, one who is hidden only in their texts, and the passion to shock “good taste.” He did everything to be “wise,” as he put it, and not just a poet — that is, a being with intelligence who lives what he writes and continues his texts through various forms of public appearance and provocation of public decency.

This combination — of the fatal literary persona and the provocative public figure — accompanied Avidan throughout his life. He developed and refined this dual personality — who loved to portray himself as a leaping tiger — from book to book, from provocation to provocation. Because of this rebellious and heroic personality, he provoked rejection (he did not receive prestigious prizes, and only the Bialik Prize was awarded to him a few months before his death), but he also attracted attention and influenced poets (for example, a deep influence on Yona Wallach). Even after his death, his personality continues to be a source of inspiration for Israeli poets and many artists

Avidan died on May 11, 1995 Hebrew date Iyar 11, 5755, in his Tel Aviv apartment at the age of 61. Engraved on his gravestone is his short poem "Adamila, the combination of two words man and word. It represents one of the hallmarks of Avidan's poetry — the expansion of linguistic boundaries, primarily through the creation of new words formed by combining two familiar ones.

Since his death, Avidan's reputation has been on the rise both in literary circles and in the popular imagination, positioning him as one of the core and contemporary poets of the Israeli canon. A volume of Selected Poems by Avidan, "Futureman," translated by Tsipi Keller, has been published by Phoneme Media in 2017.

He left a profound mark on Hebrew poetry, but the notion of being only a poet seemed narrow-minded to him. His image was etched into the cultural consciousness of Israelis primarily thanks to his poems, but also due to the fatal richness and joy he poured into all forms of communication — through his constant movement between texts and actions that challenged public propriety, and through his yearning for the communication of the future.

The David Avidan Archive was deposited in the archive of the Heksherim Institute for the Study of Jewish and Israeli Literature and Culture at Ben-Gurion University of the Negev in Be’er Sheva.

== Awards ==
In 1993, Avidan was the co-recipient (jointly with Amalia Kahana-Carmon) of the Bialik Prize for Hebrew literature.

== Movies ==
- Message from the Future, a 1981 Israeli film Avidan wrote, directed and starred in, is a science fiction movie in English about future humans visiting present-day Israel. In the year 3005, a man is sent back to 1985 to convince the present leaders make certain that World War III happens, which he guarantees will make for a better future. Having already caused natural disasters and catastrophes by coming back from the future, he now tries to force his message on the world press and TV. Sheldon Teitelbaum has judged the film 'execrable'.

== Books (poetry) – partial list ==
- Lipless Faucets, 1954
- Personal Problems, 1957
- Subtotal, 1960
- Pressure Poems, 1962
- Something for Someone, 1964
- My Electronic Psychiatrist, 1974
- Spy Satellite Transmissions, 1978
- A Book of Possibilities – Poems and More, 1985
- The Last Gulf: Desert Storm Poems and Seven Background Poems, 1991
- Collected Poems I 1951-1965, 2009
- Collected Poems II 1968-1973, 2010
- Collected Poems III 1974-1978, 2010
- Collected Poems VI 1985-1991, 2012

== See also ==
- List of Bialik Prize recipients
