= Solomon ibn Zakbel =

12th-century Spanish Jewish poet

Solomon ibn Zakbel (Hebrew: שלמה אבן צקבל; fl. 12th century), also known as Solomon ibn Sahl, was a Spanish Jewish poet. He was the author of the first known maqāma in Hebrew.

== Work ==
Solomon was the author of a satirical romance written in the form of the maqāmāt of Abu al-Ḳasim Mohammed al-Ḥarizi, which were later imitated in Hebrew by Judah al-Ḥarizi in his renowned Taḥkemoni. The hero of this romance, which, according to Joshua Heschel Schorr, is also entitled Taḥkemoni, is named Asher ben Judah. In rhymed prose, interspersed with small poems in absolutely strict rhythm, he relates his love adventures, which were marked by various disappointments and vicissitudes of fortune. According to Isidore Singer and Isaac Broydé, this poetical production, from which Al-Ḥarizi may have borrowed both the title and the style, is "remarkable for the elegance of its language and for its combination of profound thought and light banter."
