= Ithamar Handelman Smith =

Israeli writer

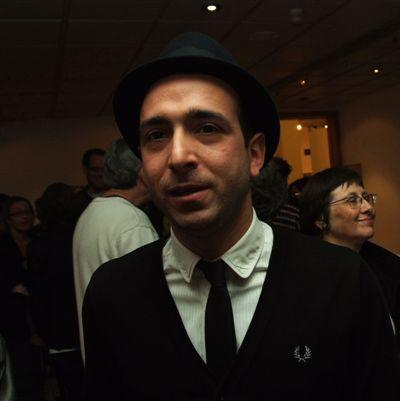
Handelman Smith as seen in Tel Aviv Museum, 2010

Itamar Handelman Smith (Hebrew: איתמר הנדלמן סמית; born May 30, 1976, in the city of Eilat, Israel), also known by his pen name Ithamar Ben-Canaan, is a British writer, columnist, filmmaker, playwright, and DJ based in London. Handelman-Smith publishes his literary and journalistic works in both English and Hebrew.

His latest book Unholy Land, published by Repeater, was released in May 2018. As a documentary filmmaker he's known for Shalom Belfast about Northern Irish factions taking sides in the Israeli–Palestinian conflict.

Handleman is named after Hebrew-language revivalist Itamar Ben-Avi. Via his paternal side Handelman Smith is descendant of 18th-century Hasidic leader grand rabbi Dov Ber of Mezeritch.

== Career ==
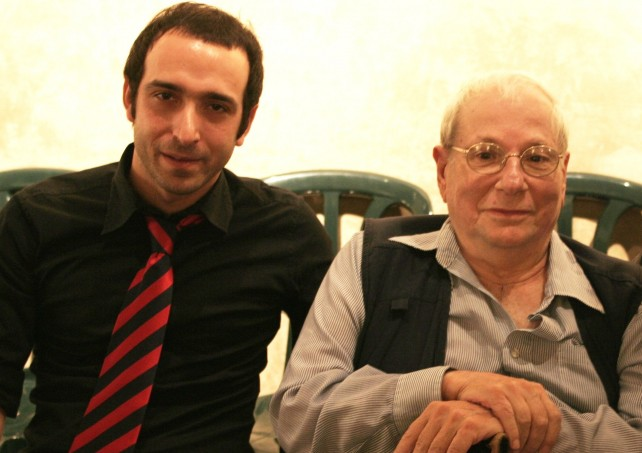
Handelman Smith and friend Yoram Kaniuk, 2009

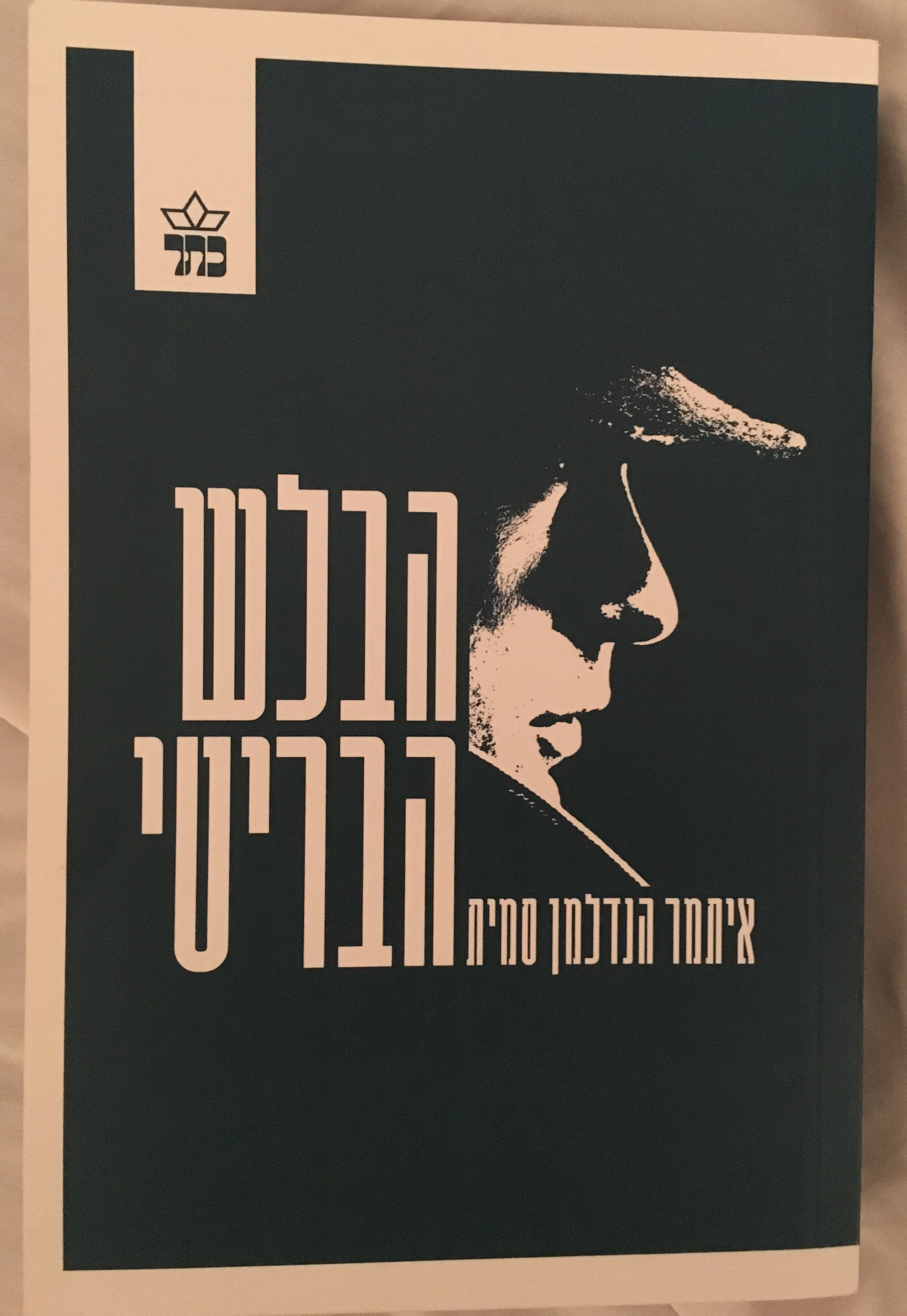
The British Detective, novel by Handelman Smith, Hebrew edition 2015

Handelman Smith began writing for the Herzliya supplement of Haaretz network at the age of 17. Between the years 1998 and 2003 he wrote a weekly culture critic column in Maariv weekend magazines. During those years he published two volumes of short fiction: Where Have You Gone, Arik Einstein? (1999) and Dreaming of Junk Food (2001).

In 2004 Handelman Smith began writing a more personal weekly column in Time Out Tel Aviv that earned cult status in Israeli culture. In addition to those collections of short stories he produced two volumes of poetry and one controversial novel. Handelman Smith also translated the poetry of Charles Bukowski into Hebrew and edited translations of other American writings.

In 2005 he was a subject of a documentary film, The Ashkenazim.

During 2009 and 2010, while living in Belfast, Northern Ireland, Handelman Smith was commissioned by the Verbal Arts Centre in Derry and the Legacy Trust UK to write a musical titled The Naked Tornado (2011) with young Northern Irish composer Neil Burns. A 30-minute-long piece of the play was staged in Belfast. In early 2012 Handelman Smith's film Shalom Belfast was released and broadcast on BBC Northern Ireland. Since October 2017 Handelman Smith moved back to the UK after living in Paris for almost seven years

Handelman Smith lives with his wife Julia Carolyn Ann Handelman Smith in London and was employed by Ha'ir, a Tel Aviv local newspaper associated with Haaretz as well as Globes (from 2013). His columns often provoked Israeli mainstream. In 2011 his piece concerning the Sephardic Jewish Israeli singer Margalit Tzan'ani was the cause of great controversies.

== Bibliography ==
- 1999 – Where Have You Gone, Arik Einstein?
- 2001 – Dreaming of Junk Food
- 2002 – Like Those Dogs Who Die of Sorrow when Their Owners Take Off for the Weekend
- 2004 – Open
- 2014 – The British Detective, published by Keter Publishing House
- 2017- "Before the Sun", published by Keter Publishing house
- 2018- "Unholy Land: An Unconventional Guide to Israel" published by Repeater

== See also ==
- Dahn Ben-Amotz
- Itamar Ben-Avi
- Nimrod Kamer
- Yoram Kaniuk
- Stilyaga
