= Itamar Bellasalma =

Brazilian footballer

Itamar
Personal information
- Full name: Itamar Antônio Bellasalma
- Date of birth: 14 February 1950 (age 76)
- Place of birth: São Carlos, Brazil
- Position: Forward

Senior career*
Years	Team	Apps	(Gls)
1965–1967	São Carlos Clube		
1968–1970	Ferroviária		
1971	Garça		
1973–1974	São Paulo	10	(1)
1973–1974	→ Marília (loan)		
1975–1976	Palmeiras	45	(10)
1977	Grêmio Maringá		
1977–1978	Londrina		
1978–1980	Grêmio Maringá		
1980	Criciúma		
1980–1981	Londrina		
1981	Grêmio Maringá		
1981	Colorado-PR		
1982	Londrina		

Managerial career
- 1983: Londrina
- 1983: Platinense
- 1985: Criciúma
- 1986: AA Votuporanguense
- 1988: Fernandópolis
- 1989: Maringá AC
- 1990: Marília
- 1991: Inter de Lages
- 1991: Fernandópolis
- 1992: Juventus-SC
- 1993: Operário Ferroviário
- 1993: Apucarana
- 1994: Jandaia
- 1995–1996: Maringá FC
- 1997: Operário Ferroviário
- 1999: Comercial-MS
- 1999: Apucarana
- 1999: Londrina
- 2000: Rio Branco-PR
- 2000: Grêmio Maringá
- 2004: Roma Apucarana
- 2004: Engenheiro Beltrão
- 2005: Roma Apucarana
- 2006: Operário-MS
- 2008: Engenheiro Beltrão
- * Club domestic league appearances and goals as of 4 October 2025

Itamar Antônio Bellasalma (born 14 February 1950) is a Brazilian former professional footballer and manager, who played as a forward.

== Playing career ==
Born in São Carlos, Bellasalma began his career at São Carlos Clube, then played for Ferroviária and Garça. In 1973, he joined São Paulo, where he played 10 matches and scored one goal, and was subsequently loaned to Marília. In 1976, he joined Palmeiras, where he played 45 matches and scored 10 goals, winning the state championship. He won a state championship again in 1977 with Grêmio Maringá and with Londrina in 1981. He stood out during his career for his fights with opposing defenders.

== Managerial career ==
Bellasalma coached several teams from 1983 to 2008, especially Londrina, Criciúma and other teams from Paraná, such as Roma Apucarana in 2004 and 2005.

== Honours ==
Palmeiras

- Campeonato Paulista: 1976

Grêmio Maringá

- Campeonato Paranaense: 1977

Londrina

- Campeonato Brasileiro Série B: 1981
- Campeonato Paranaense: 1981

Individual

- 1977 Campeonato Paranaense top scorer: 15 goals
