= Yona Wallach =

Israeli poet (1944–1985)

- יונה וולך
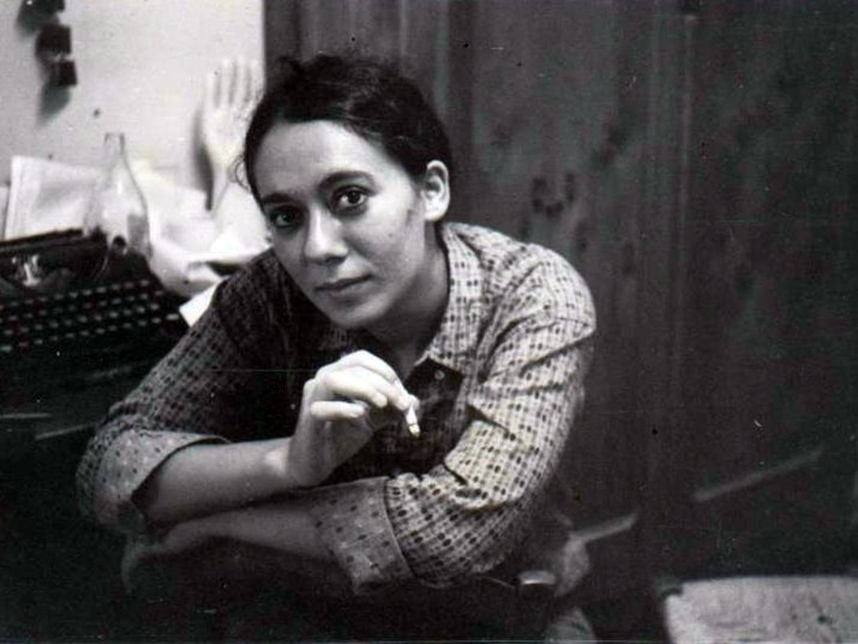
- Born: 10 June 1944; Kiryat Ono, Mandatory Palestine
- Died: 26 September 1985 (aged 41); Kiryat Ono, Israel
- Citizenship: Israeli
- Occupation: Poet

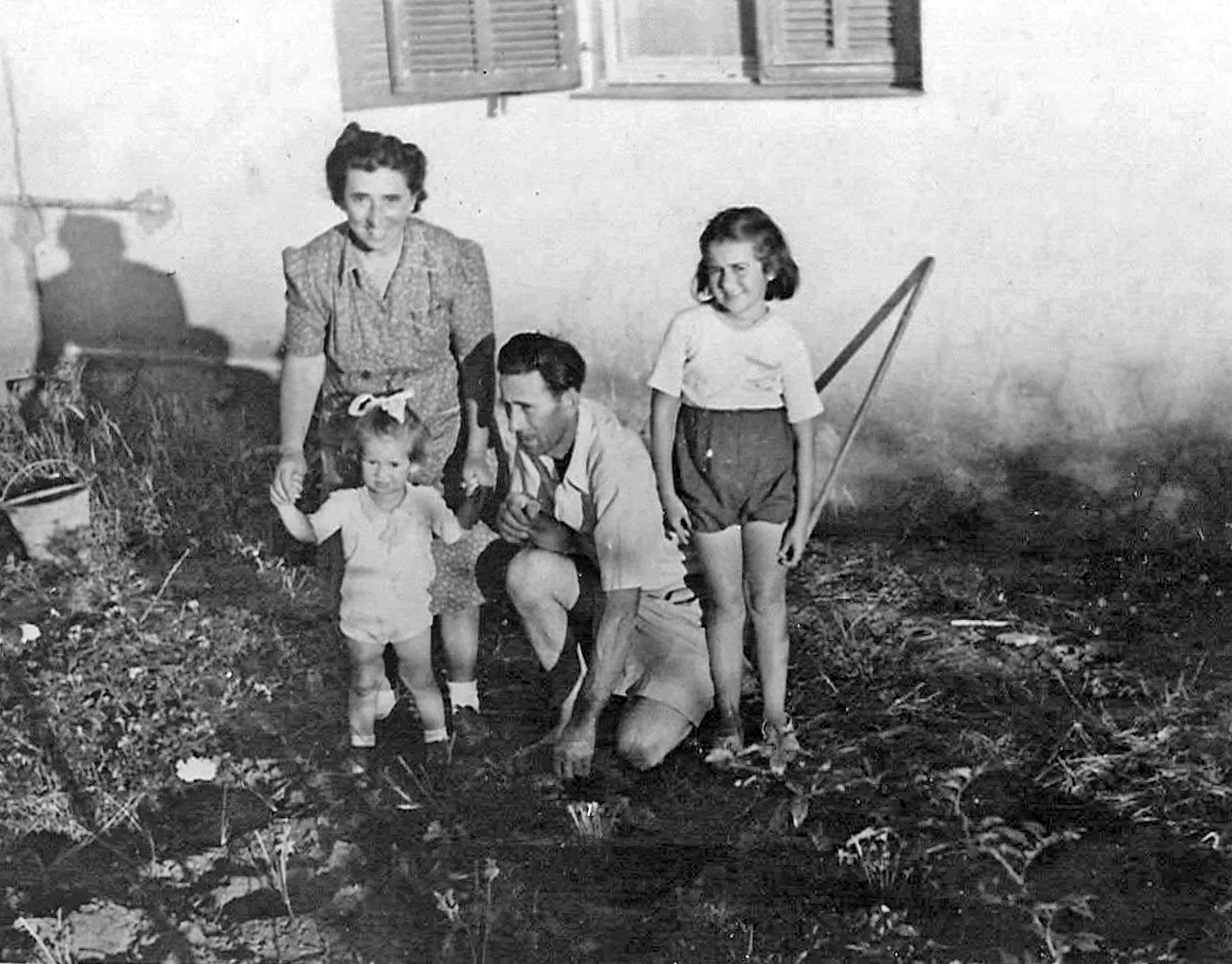
The Wallach family 1945, from right to left: Nira, Michael, Esther, Yona

Yona Wallach (Hebrew: יונה וולך; 10 June 1944 – 26 September 1985) was an Israeli poet. Her surname also appears as Volach. She is considered a revolutionary Israeli feminist and post-modernist.

Wallach had written poetry from a young age. Her work was influenced by Jewish mysticism. Throughout her life, she struggled with periods of drug addiction. She began receiving critical acclaim in the late 1970s.

Wallach developed breast cancer in 1981 and refused treatment for two years. She died in 1985.

== Biography ==
=== Early life ===
Yona Wallach was born on June 10, 1944, in Kiryat Ono, Israel. The name Yona was given to her in memory of three deceased relatives. When she was four, Wallach's father Michael was killed in the 1948 Arab-Israeli War. Wallach and her older sister Nira were raised by their widowed mother Esther on Michael Wallach Street in Kiryat Ono. As a young child, Wallach excelled in elementary school. As she grew older, she began dressing androgynously, wearing her late father’s clothes, and had her first abortion at sixteen. She was expelled from Tichon Hadash high school after tenth grade, and then spent a short time at the Avni Institute of Art and Design.

Around the age of nineteen, Wallach moved to Jerusalem, where she befriended petty thieves and drug dealers.

=== Psychiatric hospitalization and sexuality ===
Wallach experienced multiple mental breakdowns, the first one occurring in her late teens. Wallach stated that she voluntarily admitted herself to a psychiatric hospital around the age of twenty to gain insight into the mental struggles her friends were facing. However, in reality, she agreed to admission after experiencing impulses to harm her mother. At the psychiatric hospital, she underwent psychedelic therapy. Her doctor, inexperienced with dosage management, nearly caused a fatal LSD overdose during one session. Wallach enjoyed using psychedelics, describing the hallucinations as experiences that expanded her consciousness. Her therapist at the institution noted Wallach's complex sexuality, observing that she identified as homosexual while continuing to engage in relationships with men. She was known for stealing the girlfriends of her male friends.

At 24, Wallach was admitted to a psychiatric hospital for a second time, where she remained for four and a half months. Symptoms of a drug-induced psychotic break had been intensifying, leading friends to worry about her potential for self-harm. Wallach later claimed that she only began to feel safe and secure once her works were published and her reputation established.

=== Final years and death ===
Wallach returned to live with her mother, Rachel, in Kiryat Ono after her second psychiatric hospitalization. Yona served as the primary caregiver for Rachel, who had Parkinson’s disease. Their relationship was strained. Rachel Wallach's medical records indicated that she was physically abused by her daughter. During this period, Yona Wallach relied on her financial support from Rachel and did not maintain steady employment. In 1974, Yona attempted suicide and declined hospitalization afterward.

Yona Wallach began performing her poetry with a rock band she formed with two musician friends, though they insisted she recite rather than sing her poetry, as she struggled to stay in tune. Wallach captivated audiences with her provocative clothing and overtly sexual poetry.

In 1981, at the age of 36, Wallach found a lump in her breast and was diagnosed with breast cancer. She declined treatment for two years, convinced that the same inner spirit driving her poetry would also guide her healing process. As the cancer progressed and her pain intensified, she began actively seeking treatment. A doctor in Kiryat Ono informed her that she had less than eight years to live. From that point forward, she remained committed to treatment, often relying on friends to help administer her medication. Those close to her described Wallach as being lonely at the end of her life. Wallach's once rough demeanor softened, revealing a gentler side. She died on September 26, 1985.

== Literary career ==
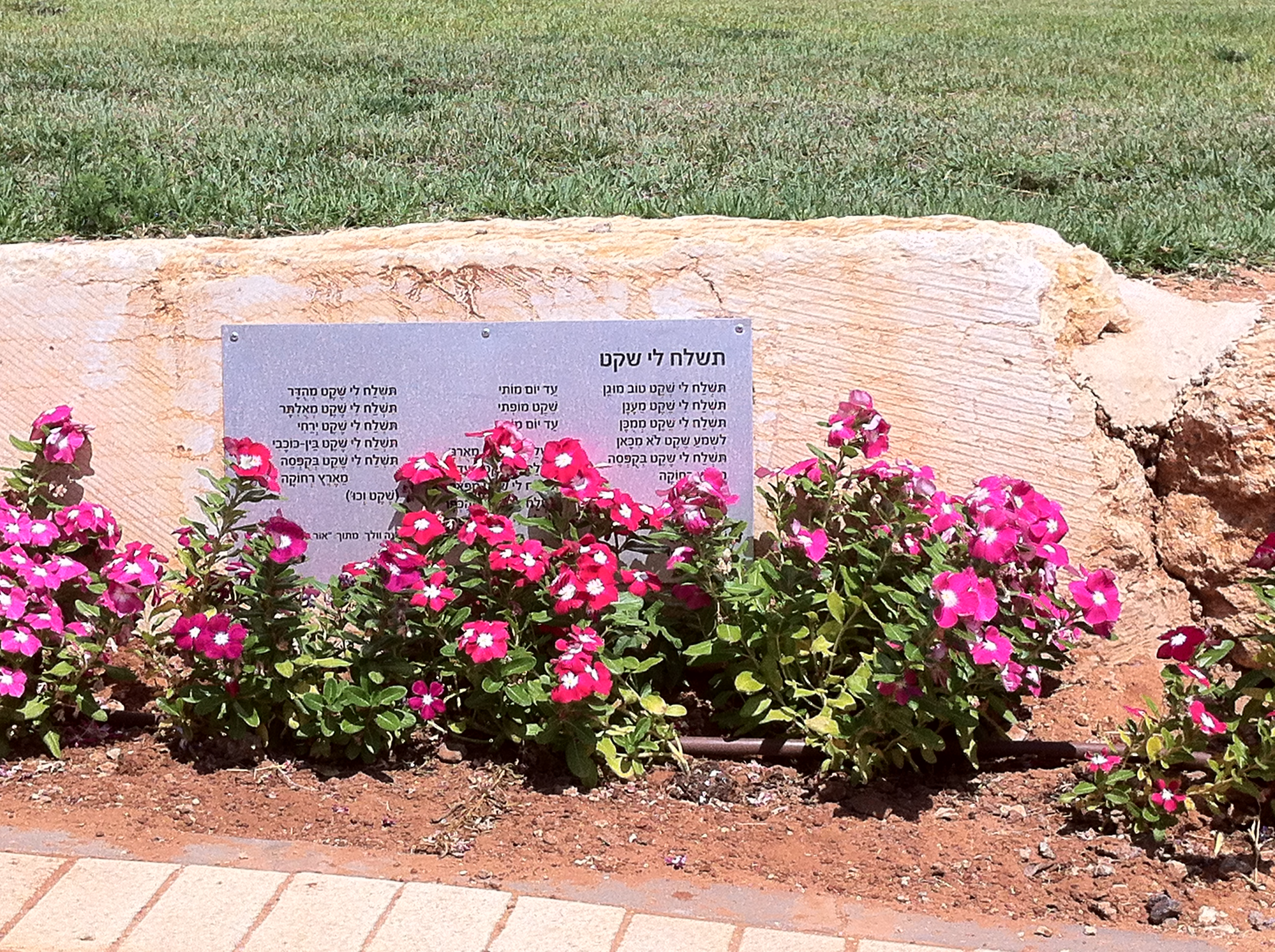
Yona Wallach sculpture garden, Kiryat Ono

Wallach knew from a young age that she wanted to be a writer. When she was kicked out of school in the tenth grade, the headmistress cited Wallach as having neglected her studies in preference to doodling and writing poems. At the age of eighteen she first attempted to be published by Eked publishing house and was rejected, likely because she did not permit any revisions. She became a member of the "Tel Aviv Poets" group, which was influenced by American Beat Poetry, with poets Meir Weiseltier and Yair Hurvitz.

It is unknown at what age she wrote her first published poems. The first of her poems to be published, one without a title, was printed on January 3, 1964, in Yediot Aharanot when she was nineteen. Hurvitz submitted the poem for her to the literary magazine. In the following months five more of her poems had been published in various magazines and periodicals, and her name was mentioned in Ha-Boker as an "important young Israeli avant-garde poet."

She spent the next few years neglecting her writing to experiment with sex and drugs, which decidedly influenced much of her future poetry. Wallach never left the country seeking intellectual inspiration like many of her literary counterparts. Instead, she surrounded herself with "societal misfits" and spent time exploring her inner self and Kabbalah — the ancient, mystical Jewish tradition of interpreting the Bible.

Though she was well known in literary circles, she received little critical acclaim until the mid 1970s. Her 1976 volume of poems, Shira, received instant acclaim. She was unanimously accepted into the Tel-Aviv Foundation for Culture and Art and won three literary prizes between the summers of 1977 and 1978. Wallach became an Israeli celebrity, with tabloids following her around and her work becoming more widely published. Her final collection, Mofa, was published posthumously in 1985.

== Books in Hebrew ==
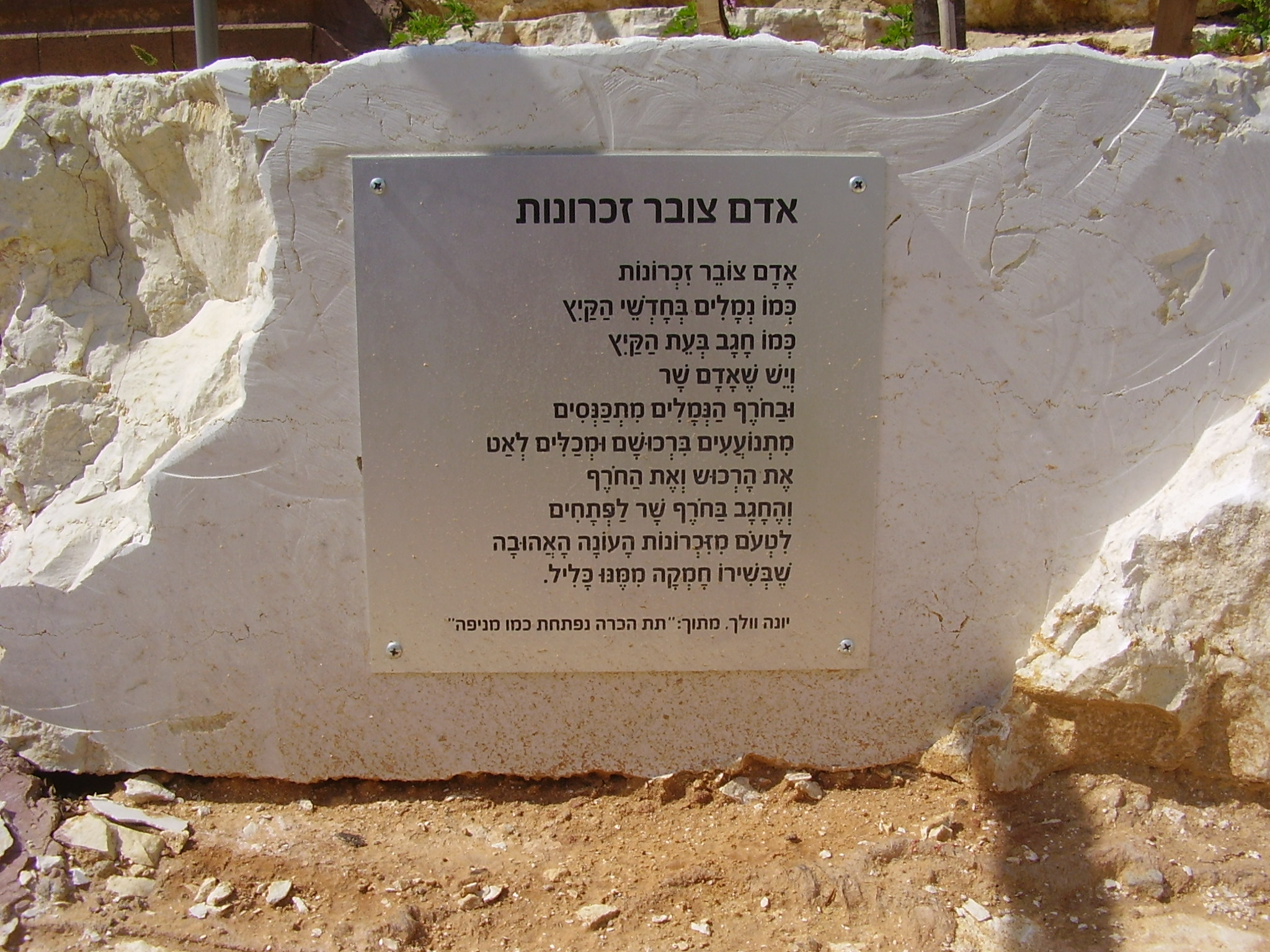
Poem by Yona Wallach, etched in stone

- Things, Achshav, 1966 [Devarim]
- Two Gardens, Daga, 1969 [Shnei Ganim]
- Collected Poems, Siman Kriah, 1976 [Shirim]
- Wild Light, Echut, 1983 [Or Pere]
- Forms, Hakibbutz Hameuchad/Siman Kriah, 1985 [Tzurot]
- Appearance, Hakibbutz Hameuchad, 1985 [Mofah]
- Selected Poems 1963–1985, Hakibbutz Hameuchad/Siman Kriah, 1992

== Books in translation ==
- Selected Poems, English: New York, Sheep Meadow, 1997
- Wallach, Yona, and Zisquit, Linda. Let the Words : Selected Poems / Yona Wallach ; Translated by Linda Stern Zisquit. Riverdale-on-Hudson, NY: Sheep Meadow Press, 2006.
- Individual poems have been published in: Arabic, Chinese, Czech, Dutch, English, Esperanto, Estonian, French, German, Greek, Hungarian, Italian, Japanese, Polish, Romanian, Russian, Serbo-Croatian, Spanish, Vietnamese, and Yiddish.

== Awards ==
- Kugel Prize awarded by the Municipality of Holon (1978)

== See also ==
- Zelda (poet)
- Rachel (poet)
- Women in Israel

== Relevant literature ==
- Mark, Zvi. "The Dybbuk as imagery and as psychological state in the work and life of Yona Wallach." Hebrew Studies 50, no. 1 (2009): 245-264.
- Her poem "a summary (of a conversation)" Google-translated to something resembling English
