= Admiel Kosman =

Israeli poet and professor of Talmud (born 1957)

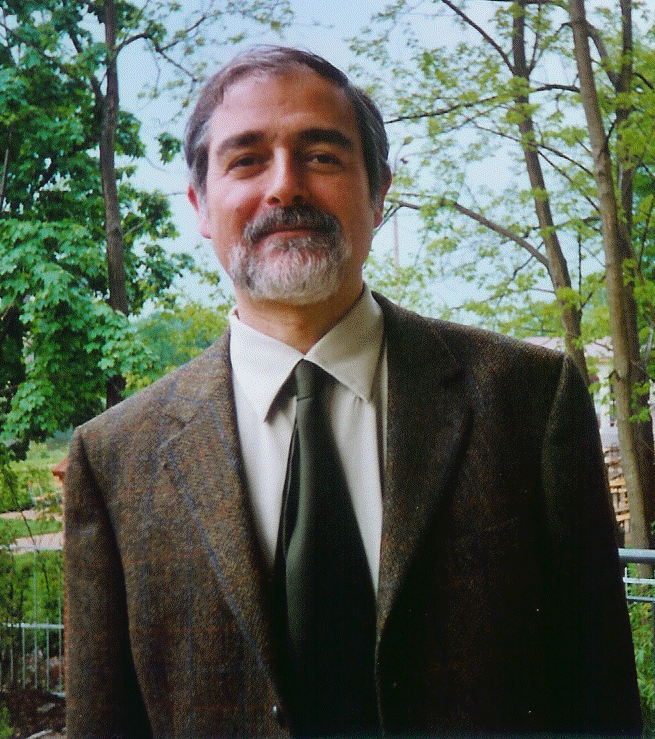
Admiel Kosman

Admiel Kosman (Hebrew: אדמיאל קוסמן; born in 1957) is an Israeli poet and professor of Talmud.

== Biography ==
Admiel Kosman was born in Haifa, Israel to an Orthodox Jewish family. His father hailed from a German Jewish family living in France, and his mother immigrated from Iraq. After serving in the Israel Defense Forces in an artillery unit and attending Yeshivat Hakotel in the Old City of Jerusalem, he studied graphic art and pottery at the Bezalel Academy of Art and Design. He did his Ph.D. in Talmud at Bar-Ilan University in Ramat Gan.

Kosman has four children from his first marriage.

Since relocating to Berlin, Kosman is a professor of Religious and Jewish Studies at the University of Potsdam and the academic director of Abraham Geiger Reform Rabbinical Seminary.

Kosman is the author of eight books of poetry. His poems often deal with the tension between his religious faith and artistic sensibilities. Kosman has also written three volumes of post-modern scholarship on gender in traditional Jewish texts. In 2000, he was invited by Nobel Prize–winning Polish poets Czeslaw Milosz and Wislawa Szymborska to participate in an interfaith festival in Kraków, Poetry – between Prayer and Song.

== Awards ==
Kosman has been awarded national prizes for poetry including:

- the Bernstein Prize (original Hebrew-language poetry category) (1991)
- the Prime Minister's Prize (1976, 1992)
- the Brenner Prize (2000)

== Published work ==
=== Poetry ===
- And Then the Act of Poetry, 1980 [Ve-Aharei Mora`ot Ma`ase Ha-Shir]
- The Prince's Raiment, 1988 [Bigdei Nasich]
- Soft Rags, 1991 [Smartutim Rakim]
- What I Can, 1995 [Ma Ani Yachol]
- We Reached God, 1998 [Higanu Le-Elohim]
- Forty Love Poems and Two Additional Love Poems to God, 2003 [Arbaim Shirei Ahava Ve-Shnei Shirei Ahava Nosafim Le-Elohim]
- Proscribed Prayers, Siddur Alternativi, Seventy One New Poems), Hakibutz Hameuchad, Tel Aviv 2007
- You’re Awesome! (Ktaim Itcha), Hakibutz Hameuchad, Tel Aviv 2011
- Approaching You in English: Selected Poems of Admiel Kosman, translated by Lisa Katz and Shlomit Naim-Naor (Zephyr Press, 2011)

=== Books and articles ===
- Gender and Dialogue in the Rabbinic Prism (Studia Judaica; de Gruyter, New York and Berlin, 2012)
- "The Story of a Giant Story - The Winding Way of Og King of Bashan in the Jewish Aggadic Tradition", in: HUCA 73, (2002) pp. 157–190.
- Men’s World: Reading Masculinity in Jewish Stories in a Spiritual Context. Ergon, Würzburg 2009.
- "Two Women Who Were Sporting with Each Other": A Reexamination of the Halakhic Approaches to Lesbianism as a Touchstone for Homosexuality in General, (with Anat Sharbat), HUCA 75, (2004), pp. 37–73
- Men’s Tractate: Rav and the Butcher and other Stories – On Manhood, Love and Authentic Life in Aggadic and Hassidic Stories, Keter, Jerusalem 2002
- "Blessed art thou who made me a man – and a woman". Archived from the original on 2002-06-28.
- Treading toward sanctity. Musings and meditations on close to a century's worth of discussions occasioned by Van Gogh's series of paintings of worn shoes. Was the artist's statement primarily aesthetic, or political, or was it religious? In: Ha-Aretz (19.11.2009)

== See also ==
- The Modern Hebrew Poem Itself
