= Gabriel Preil =

- Preil reading his work in 1983.
- Born: 21 August 1911; Tartu, Livonia, Russian Empire
- Died: 5 June 1993 (aged 81); Jerusalem, Israel
- Occupations: Poet, translator
- Writing career
- Notable awards: Bialik Prize (1992)

Gabriel Preil (Hebrew: גבריאל פרייל; August 21, 1911 – June 5, 1993) was a modern Hebrew poet active in the United States, who wrote in Hebrew and Yiddish. Preil translated Robert Frost and Walt Whitman into Hebrew.

== Biography ==
Gabriel (Yehoshua) Preil was born in Tartu, Livonia, Russian Empire in 1911, but he was raised in Krakės, Kovno until his father died. He then moved with his mother to the United States in 1922. Though primarily influenced by Yiddish poets of the Inzikh (Introspective) movement, Preil's influence extends to younger Israeli poets (Dan Pagis nicknamed him "The Duke of New York") and Israelis were his primary audience. Preil lived with his mother and step-father in the Bronx, NY, until their deaths. In 1975, he received an honorary Doctorate of Hebrew Letters from Hebrew Union College. Preil died in Jerusalem on June 5, 1993, while visiting on a book tour.

== Poems ==
Many of Preil's poems focus on New York city, Maine, and his grandfather, a rabbi, who lived in Lithuania and wrote for Ha-Melitz. One of his poems is dedicated to the Israeli poet Leah Goldberg: "Leah's Absence". Another references Abraham Mapu; others, Jacob Glatstein and Mendele Mocher Sforim.

Yael Feldman wrote of Preil's Yiddish and American atmosphere, "One could say that Preil's life and art are a manifestation of two diametrically opposite movements: His physical biography led him further away from Israeli soil, but, through his artistic activity, he tenaciously bridged the distance and successfully approached the contemporary sources of his poetic medium. In order to do this, he had to cross two language barriers: Yiddish, his European mother tongue, which continued to be the language spoken at home throughout his life, and English, the language he acquired in his new home-country and which soon became a rich literary source for young Preil, the avid reader."
