= Yair Hurvitz =

Israeli poet

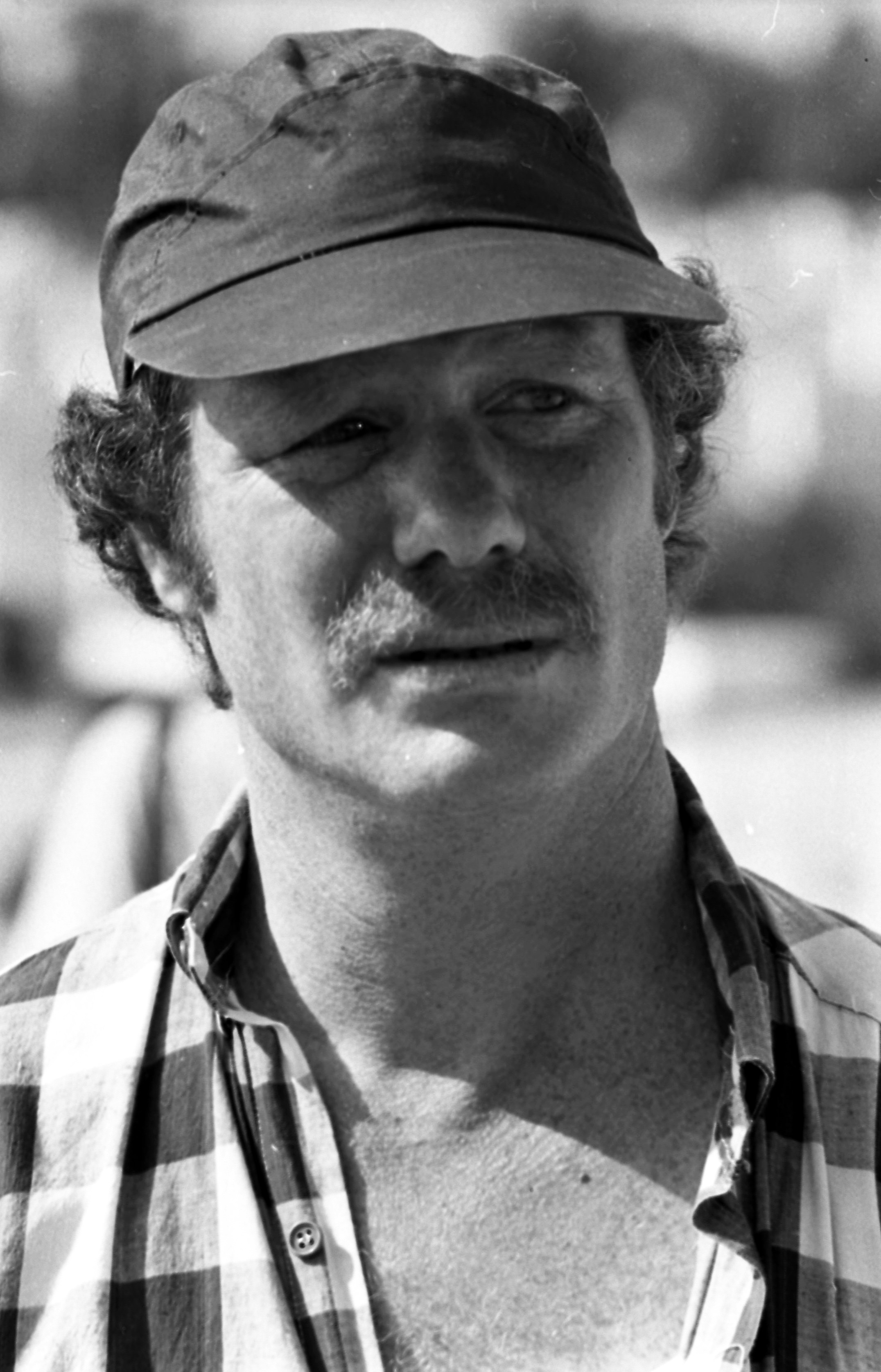
Funeral of the poet Yona Wallach. Photo shows: Yair Hurvitz participating the funeral.

Yair Hurvitz (Hebrew: יאיר הורביץ; 1941–1988), also known as Yair Horowitz, was an Israeli poet who began publishing poetry in the 1960s, he was a member of the "Tel Aviv Poets" group. His poems mark a return to the tradition of Haim Nachman Bialik. According to literary critic, Ariel Hirschfeld, a poem by Hurvitz comes close "to an invocation, to the creation of a visionary world by means of the word."

He died in 1988 at the age of 47 from the heart disease that had plagued him since childhood.
