= Meir Wieseltier =

Israeli poet and translator (1941–2023)

- מאיר ויזלטיר
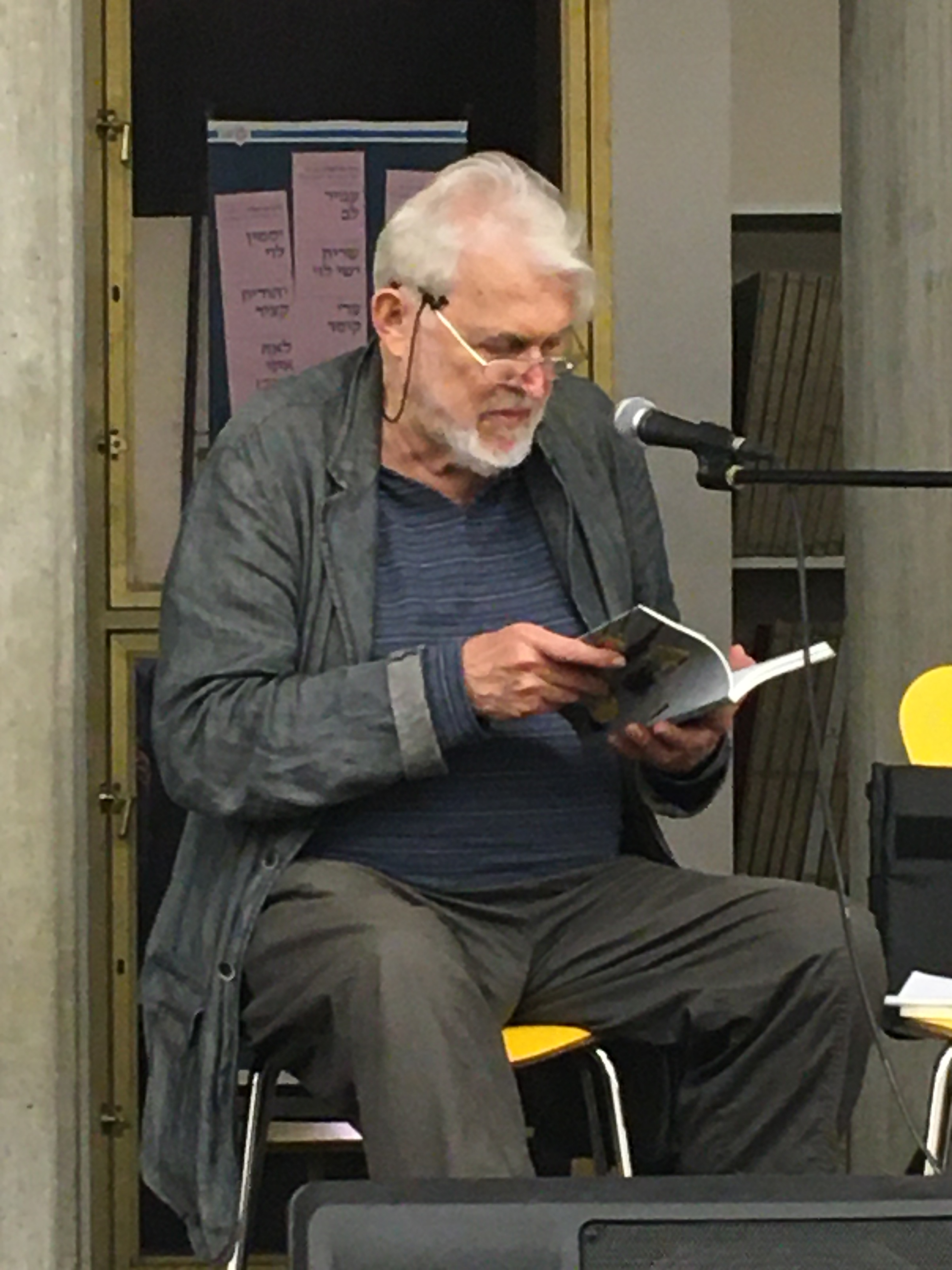
- Meir Wiseltier at Beit Ariela, 2021
- Born: March 8, 1941; Moscow, Soviet Union
- Died: March 30, 2023 (aged 82); Ramat Gan, Israel
- Occupations: poet, translator, journalist
- Writing career
- Language: Hebrew

Meir Wieseltier (Hebrew: מאיר ויזלטיר; March 8, 1941 – March 30, 2023) was an Israeli poet and translator. Wieseltier was awarded the 2000 Israel Prize.

== Biography ==
Meir Wieseltier was born in Moscow in 1941, shortly before the German invasion of Russia. He was taken to Novosibirsk in southwestern Siberia by his mother and two older sisters. His father was killed while serving in the Red Army in Leningrad. After two years in Poland, Germany, and France, the family immigrated to Israel. Wieseltier grew up in Netanya.

In 1955, he moved to Tel Aviv, where he has lived ever since. He published his first poems at the age of eighteen. He studied at the Hebrew University of Jerusalem. In the early 1960s, he joined a group known as the Tel Aviv Poets. He was co-founder and co-editor of the literary magazine Siman Kriya, and a poetry editor for the Am Oved publishing house.

== Literary career ==
Wieseltier published 13 volumes of verse. He translated English, French, and Russian poetry into Hebrew. His translations include four of Shakespeare's tragedies, as well as novels by Virginia Woolf, Charles Dickens, E.M. Forster, and Malcolm Lowry. Wieseltier often wrote in the first person, assuming the role of a moralist searching for values in the midst of chaos. He penned powerful poems of social and political protest in Israel. His voice is alternately anarchic and involved, angry and caring, trenchant and lyric.

Wieseltier was a poet in residence at the University of Haifa.

== Awards ==
Among the many awards Wieseltier received are the following:

- In 1977 and 2011 Wieseltier was the co-recipient Prime Minister's Prize for Hebrew Literary Works
- In 1994, Wieseltier was the co-recipient (jointly with Hanoch Levin) of the Bialik Prize for literature.
- In 2000, he received the Israel Prize, for literature and poetry.

== Published works ==
- Shirim Iti'im (Slow Poems), 2000
- Merudim Vesonatot (Merudim and Sonnets), 2009
- Perek Alef, Perek Beit (Chapter 1, Chapter 2), 1967
- Meah Shirim (100 Poems), 1969
- Kakh (Take It), 1973
- Davar Optimi, Asiyat Shirim (Something Optimistic, The Making of a Poem), 1976
- Pnim Vahutz (Interior and Exterior), 1977
- Motzah El Ha-Yam (Exit into the Sea), 1981
- Kitzur Shnot Hashishim (The Concise Sixties) 1984
- Ee Yevani (Greek Island) 1985
- Michtavim Veshirim Aherim (Letters and other poems) 1986
- Makhsan (Storehouse), 1994 [Mahsan]
- The Flower of Anarchy, 2003, ISBN 978-0-520-23552-6
- Forty, 2010, (Arbaim)
- Davar Optimi, Asiyat Shirim (Something Optimistic, The Making of a Poem, a new edition + Appendix), 2012

== See also ==
- List of Bialik Prize recipients
- List of Israel Prize recipients
