= Joshua Simon (writer) =

Israeli writer (born 1979)

- יהושע סימון
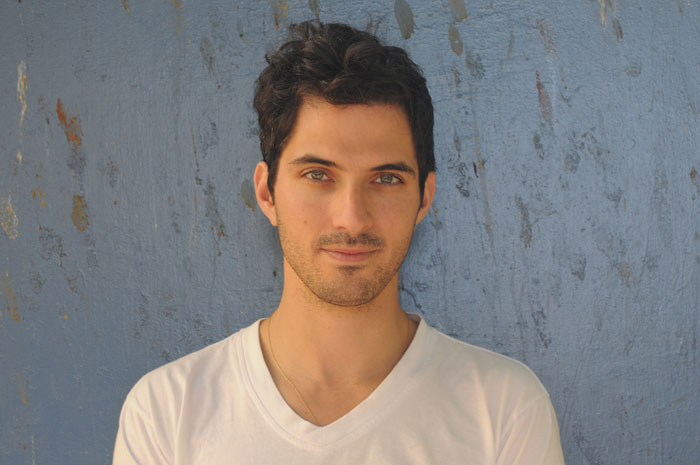
- Simon in 2011
- Born: March 3, 1979 (age 47)
- Education: Tel Aviv University (BA) Goldsmiths College (MPhil, PhD)
- Occupations: Curator and writer
- Organization(s): The Free Academy, Baboon Films, Maayan publishing, The New and Bad Art gallery, Guerrilla Culture

Joshua Simon (Hebrew: יהושע סימון; born 1979, Tel Aviv) is a curator, writer, publisher, cultural critic, poet, filmmaker and public intellectual. He currently lives in Philadelphia.

In 2024, Simon curated a seminal art project in Vienna Secession titled SLIME .

Prior to that, Simon curated exhibitions in museums and art spaces in Tel Aviv-Yafo, NYC, Melbourne, London, Zürich, Vienna, Berlin, and Amsterdam, among other places. Simon is former director and chief curator at MoBY-Museums of Bat Yam, Israel (2012- 2017), which made him the youngest museum director in the history of the country. Co-founding editor of the Tel Aviv-Yafo based Maayan publishing together with Roy Chicky Arad. His writing has been taught among other places at the Royal College of Art London, UK, Northwestern University Chicago, US, and the Oslo National Academy of the Arts Norway.

== Art ==
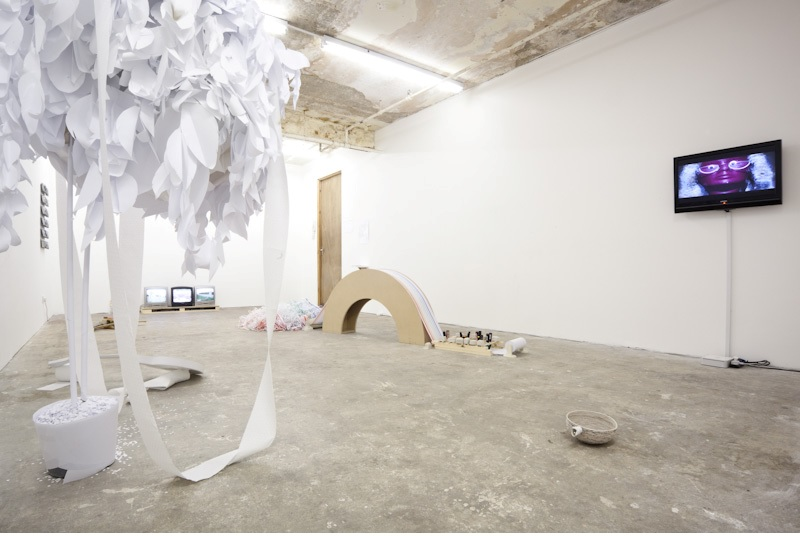
Installation view of The Unreadymade

Simon began curating in his rooftop apartment which he named The Free Academy Pavilion of Art, on Jaffa Rd. 3, Tel Aviv. The debut exhibition, I Slept With Ari Libsker (2001), gained mythical stature as several artists in it went on to become prominent cultural figures in the city and worldwide, namely Roee Rosen, Zoya Cherkassky and Roy Chicky Arad.

Simon is signed as curator on some seminal exhibitions in the Israeli art scene and internationally. In 2004 he curated Sharon, an exhibition which is considered the first to introduced a class reading to the imagery of the Occupation. In 2007, at the age of 28, Simon curated The Rear - The First Herzliya Biennial for Contemporary Art, which was a multi-venue art event at the Herzliya Museum of Art and in non-art spaces around the coastal city, with new works commissioned from 75 artists. That same year Simon co-curated with Maayan Strauss and Roy Chicky Arad the exhibition Doron, around a key Israeli collector Doron Sabag, and the relation of him being a key donor to museums to his business in human resources and the deteriorating workers rights in the local labor market. It has been argued that the fact that Sabag is on the board of directors of the Tel Aviv Museum of Art, blocked Simon from being seriously considered for the position of chief curator at the Tel Aviv Museum of Art a decade later. In 2012 Simon curated together with Roy Chicky Arad and Ari Libsker the exhibition Iran in opposition to Israeli government plans to go to war with Iran.

Simon headed the theory studies at the Postgraduate program, Hamidrasha School of Art, Beit Berl College, which he helped to set up (2009-2014).

During his tenure at MoBY - Museums of Bat Yam, Simon initiated an international programming with group and solo-shows which traveled around the world. As director of MoBY, Simon put special emphasis on expanding outreach programs, developing funding options and facilities and cataloging the museum's collection.

Simon has worked with artists, writers and curators such as Hito Steyerl, Anri Sala, Anna Witt, Thomas Galler, Cristina Garrido, Nicole Wermers, Micah Hesse, Ohad Meromi, Olaf Nicolai, Francesco Finizio, Mika Rotenberg, Keren Cytter, Ari Libsker, Nimrod Kamer, Maayan Strauss, Vincent Vulsma, Harald Thys and Jos de Gruyter, Ekaterina Degot, Boyan, Elisheva Levy, Ariella Azoulay, Jan Verwoert, Ingo Niermann, Kerem Halbrecht, Lara Favaretto, Irit Rogoff, Caterina Riva, Omer Fast, Joseph Grima, Noam Yuran, Jodi Dean, Noa Yafe, Bini Adamczak, Slavoj Zizek, Aim Deuelle Luski, Michael E. Smith, Ruti Sela and Maayan Amir, Oliver Ressler, David Riff, Noa Tsaushu, Zoya Cherkassky, Simon Fujiwara, Doron Rabina, Avi Bohbot, Zachary Formwalt, Moshe Gershuni, Harun Farocki, Yael Bartana, Yair Garbuz, Boris Buden, and Roee Rosen, among others. His writing has been published in a wide range of publications: Springerin, Frieze, Afterall, Domus International, Modern Painters, Temporary Art Review, Artpress, Mousse Magazine, Art Actuel, e-flux journal, Public Seminar and Israeli Art magazine Studio.

Simon is a fellow at the Vera List Center for Art and Politics, The New School, New York (2011-2013), and the Akademie de Künst der Welt, Cologne (2017).

=== Neomaterialism ===
The book Neomaterialism (2013), examines the meaning of materialism today, as materiality has been supposedly defeated by financial and digital operations. Since the so-called dematerialization of currencies and art practices in the late 1960s and early 1970, we have witnessed several shifts the book claims: the focus of labor has moved from production to consumption, the commodity has become the historical subject, and symbols now behave like materials (brands etc.). Neomaterialism explores the meaning of the world of commodities, and reintroduces various notions of dialectical materialism into the conversation on the subjectivity and vitalism of things. At the height of the influence of Object Oriented Ontology and speculative realism in contemporary art circles, the book provided a much needed critique of these trends of re-fetishization and de-contextualization. Putting debt at the center of the contemporary experience, the book explores our material culture following the 2008 crisis and the attempts to secure the art market. Simon put forward several concept in the book, such as the unreadymade, sentimental value, and the promise of the dividual as a means for a vocabulary in this new economy of meaning. Reflecting on the general intellect as labor and the subjugation of an overqualified generation to the neo-feudal order of debt finance — with a particular focus on dispossession and rent economy, post-appropriation display strategies and negation, the barricade and capital's technocratic fascisms—Neomaterialism merges traditions of epic communism with the communism that is already here.

==== Reception ====
Neomaterialism has been taught in several art programs around the world, and generated several reading groups in Europe, the UK and the US. Among the reactions to it Boris Groys wrote: "After a short period of ‘unbearable lightness of being,’ the social gravitation begins to be felt again. In his book Joshua Simon describes and analyzes the growing weight of the technical, economic, material basis of our society. The author's sensibility for today's Zeitgeist is at the same time entertaining and precise." Jan Verwoert, wrote for Frieze Magazine: "In his new book Neomaterialism, Joshua Simon perceptively argues that debt is the crux of the matter. Credit card purchases and mortgage settlements may feel abstract at first. But debt brings its material truth home to you: you do not own that new computer, TV, car or flat; they own you." Pelin Tan wrote in Domus Magazine: "Neomaterialism is a book that prevents us to fall into the pessimism of perceiving the thought of new materialism as a minimalist approach as well as to reconsider our practice as curators, architects and artists in a transversal way in order to create a further criticism not only of the modernist but also post-structuralist heritages of representation and subject-object relations." And Louis Moreno wrote in Onlineopen.org: "Perhaps Simon’s book represents a new form of guide to contemporary art. This is art as diagnostic toolkit, able to decipher the complex threats that lurk within the fixtures and fittings of everyday life […] Simon’s implicit suggestion that neomaterialist art embodies an auto-critique of financialised capitalism is fascinating."

The book had numerous print runs.

=== The New and Bad Art Gallery ===
In the summer of 2007 Simon and Arad opened together with artist Maayan Strauss The New and Bad Art Gallery in Tel Aviv, which presented a line-up of debut solo exhibitions by young female artists (Eden Bannet, Inbal Strauss, Noa Tsaushu, Oren Ben Moreh, Efrat Kedem and Fumio Sakurai), with two male exceptions (Nimrod Kamer and Know Hope). Initially planned to operate for six months, the gallery re-opened after a few months in Haifa under the directorship of Natalie Levin, and operated there for two years.

=== Notable concepts ===
Simon's work is often identified with several concepts -

- The Curatorial
- Unreadymade
- The Overqualified
- Dividual
- Mesoscopic
- Metastability

== Publishing and Film ==
Since the late 1990s, Simon has been working closely with poet and writer Roy Chicky Arad on a number of initiatives in Tel Aviv. Together they founded The University of Shenkin and The Free Academy (for which Simon opened the Art Pavilion in his apartment), two platforms of nomadic study that were hosted by art schools and art festivals, theatres and schools. Out of these initiatives came out a travelling poetry reading program that Simon and Arad initiated, which in turn morphed into Guerilla Culture – a platform of poets and activists who organized poetry demonstrations and publications throughout the 2000s.

Parallel to these projects in poetry, since the 2000 Simon has been writing and directing short films as a member of the group of filmmakers Baboon, together with Tom Shoval, Daniel Adar, Michael Hanegbi, Adam Sanderson and Oren Shay. Simon's films were shown among other places on Arte/ZDF, Israeli channel 1 and channel 2, and in Anthology Film Archives, NYC, and in The Berlinale Film Festival, Mar Del Plata, Argentina, Rencontres Internationales Paris and Berlin, FIDMarseille France, Oberhausen IFF Germany, INVIDEO and Milan Short Film Festival, among other places. For his film The Radicals (2001), Simon was awarded The Jerusalem Cinematheque Award for Young Filmmaker.

In 2005 Simon and Arad formed Maayan Publishing, which publishes Maayan Magazine for Poetry, Literature and Ideas which they co-edit; Western (Maarvon) – New Film Magazine (which Simon edits); The New and Bad Contemporary Art Magazine (which they edit together with Natalie Levin); and a series for poetry books and original theatre plays. Simon is the author of the poetry book National Citizens. In the first issue of Maayan he published a list called "The Prince", exploring his life and views on the world from A to Z. Since then he wrote essays for the magazine and translated for it songs by Woody Guthrie and Pete Seeger among others. Simon translated Mierle Landerman Ukeles "Maintenance Art Manifesto" (1969) into Hebrew on its 40th anniversary for The New and Bad Contemporary Art Magazine

=== Maarvon (Western) – New Film Magazine ===
Originally, Maarvon was intended as an extended supplement to Maayan Magazine dedicated to cinema and film, but eventually it grew to become an independent film magazine. On its board are key filmmakers, programmers and scholars such as Dan Shadur, Adam Aboulafia, Laliv Melamed, Dani Rosenberg, Nimrod Kamer, Ari Libsker, Tom Shoval, and Karin Rywkind Segal. The magazine also included a column by artist and filmmaker Roee Rosen (issues 1–6). While expanding the writing on contemporary cinema in Hebrew, the magazine made it its goal to look carefully into Israeli film history and present, with essays on sub-genres and rediscovered figures, funding conditions and theoretical blind spots, films by female filmmakers, overview of themes and styles. In recent issues the magazine has been focusing more and more on the shift from montage to the digital. It has dedicated special issues to filmmakers such as Jean Luc Godard, Alexander Kluge, Hito Steyerl, Harun Farocki and others, as they have portrayed the shift from visualising the totality of the social through montage to an exploration of the totality of capital in the digital. Parallel to these filmmakers, the magazine highlighted the work of Albert Serra, Jia Zhangke, Amos Guttman, Abderrahmane Sissako, Scandar Copti, Lisandro Alonso, Barry Jenkins, Apichatpong Weerasethakul, Keren Yedaya, Hagar Ben-Asher, Pedro Costa, Adam Sandler, Rob Schneider, Avi Mograbi, Peter Watkins, Roberto Rossellini, Sasha Grey, Russ Meyer, Pier Paolo Pasolini, Miguel Gomes, Dušan Makavejev, Matías Piñeiro, Elida Gera, Kendrick Lamar, Claire Denis, Michal Bat-Adam. Simon also contributed to the magazine essays on Israeli cinema, on finance and psychosis, and on contemporary romantic comedies of the 2000s and Bromance movies, among other subjects.

=== Journalism ===
In the media magazine Firma (a supplement of Globes Financial News), Simon has published articles from 2000 to 2009 on various issues. Simon contributed to the culture section of the daily newspaper Globes with art reviews and interviews and was the newspaper's art critic and contributor to the paper's Op-Eds. In Firma, Simon served as editorial board member, ran a column "Reading the News" which was a focused on media critique, interviewed key figures of the local political scene such as Benjamin Netanyahu (Minister of Finance at the time), Ehud Olmert (Minister of Industry, Trade and Labor at the time), Avigdor Lieberman (Minister of Strategic Affairs at the time), Amir Peretz (Chairman of the General Organization of Workers in Israel at the time), Akiva Orr (key political figure of anti-Zionist Left in Israel since the 1960s), Shimshon Bichler (world renowned scholar of the political economy of Israel's military-financial complex), filmmaker Menachem Golan, as well as International philosopher Slavoj Zizek and many others.

In addition, from 2005 to 2009 Simon ran a weekly column in the now mythological metro weekly Ha-Ir (the Tel Aviv equivalent of The Village Voice). The column, "Close to Home," was key to define the changes the city has undergone in its leadership's attempt to position it as a Global City. In his column, Simon observed urban developments and gentrification trends, gave voice to right to the city movements and expanded on the intertwined political and architectural meaning of public sphere.

== Select exhibitions ==
- In The Liquid – group exhibition, PrintScreen Media Art Festival, Holon Israel, Oct.-Nov. 2018
- Second Nature – group exhibition, the main exhibition at the fifth International Photography Festival, Tel Aviv (Nov.-Dec. 2017), Traveled to Gate3 gallery in Haifa (Feb.-April 2018)
- The Kids Want Communism – a two and a half year long program of exhibitions and events marking 99 years to the Soviet Revolution. A joint project of Tranzit, Prague; Free/Slow University of Warsaw; State of Concept, Athens; Škuc gallery, Ljubljana; Visual Culture Research Center, Kyiv and MoBY-Museums of Bat Yam, with exhibitions also travelling to Westspace, Melbourne and Kunstraum Kreuzberg Bethanien, Berlin (October 2015-November 2017)
- Roee Rosen: Group Exhibition – retrospective exhibition of the works of Roee Rosen, Tel Aviv Museum of Art, Israel, January–April 2016, co-curated with Gilad Melzer
- Factory Fetish – group exhibition, Westspace Melbourne, Australia, November–December 2015, co-curated with Liang Luscombe
- Francesco Finizio: ARKPAKCRAFTRAFTCLINICCLUBPUB – solo exhibition, MoBY-Museums of Bat Yam, February–May 2015
- Ruti Sela – solo exhibition, MoBY-Museums of Bat Yam, April–July 2014; Stedelijk Museum Bureau Amsterdam, Feb.-March 2015
- Goods – group exhibition, MoBY – Museums of Bat Yam, November 2013, co-curated with Liz Hajaj
- ReCoCo – Life Under Representational Regimes – group exhibition, White Space - Office for Curating-Art-Theory, Zurich Feb. 2011; Kunsthalle Exnergasse, Vienna, May 2011; MoBY – Museums of Bat Yam, May 2013, co-curated with Siri Peyer
- Iran – group exhibition, The Spaceship at Hayarkon 70, Tel Aviv-Yafo, March–May 2012. co-curated with Ari LIbsker and Roy Chicky Arad
- Omer Fast – Satellites – solo exhibition, Herzliya Museum of Contemporary Art, January–April 2012
- The Unreadymade – group exhibition, FormContent, London Dec. 2010-Jan. 2011
- The Invisible Hand – group exhibition, Sommer Contemporary Art Gallery, Tel Aviv-Yafo, Oct.-Dec. 2009
- Internazionale! – group exhibition, Left Bank: The Israeli Communist Party Culture Club, Tel Aviv-Yafo, Sep. 2008
- "Come to Israel: It’s Hot and Wet and We Have the Humus" – group exhibition, Storefront for Art and Architecture, NYC; April 2008
- The Rear – The 1st Herzliya Biennial of Contemporary Art, Israel, 2007
- Doron – group exhibition, Minshar College of Art, Tel Aviv-Yafo, 2006, co-curated with Maayan Strauss and Roy Chicky Arad
- Blanks – group exhibition, Center for Contemporary Art, Tel Aviv-Yafo, Nov. 2005, co-curated with Sergio Edelsztien
- Sharon – group exhibition, Teachers College of Technology, Tel Aviv-Yafo, 2004
- Amos Gitai – A Retrospective, travelling film program in Israeli cinematheques, 2003
- I slept with Ari Libsker - group exhibition, The Free Academy Pavilion of Art, Tel Aviv-Yafo, 2001
- 96 Elections – solo exhibition of Roy Chicky Arad, Tal Esther Gallery, Tel Aviv-Yafo, 2000

== Authored books ==
- National Citizens - Essays [אזרחים לאומיים], Tel Aviv: Havkin Publishing, 1998, 6 pp. (In Hebrew) [reprinted in: Hamidrasha Art Journal, Issue 11: Parody/Irony, 2008 (In Hebrew)]
- National Citizens [אזרחים לאומיים], Tel Aviv: Shadurian Publishing, 2001, 80 pp. (In Hebrew)
- Neomaterialism, Berlin: Sternberg Press, 2013, 194 pp. ISBN 978-3-943365-08-5

== Edited books ==
- Sea & Sun, catalogue for the Israeli Pavilion at the Venice Architecture Biennale 2004, 124 pp.
- With Asma Agbarieh-Zahalka, Turky Ammar, Roy Chicky Arad, Marwan Makhoul, Nir Nader, Yaara Shehori and Mati Shmuelof, Red – Class Poetry [אדומה – אסופה לשירה מעמדית], Maayan Publishing in partnership with Etgar, Hakivun Mizrah, 2007, 232 pp. (In Hebrew and Arabic)
- With Roy Chicky Arad, Ronen Eidelman, Tomer Gardi, Nir Nader, Yaara Shehori, Mati Shmuelof and Boaz Yaniv, Out – Against The Attack on Gaza [לצאת – נגד ההתקפה על עזה], Maayan Publishing in partnership with Daka, Etgar, Guerilla Culture, Maarav and Sedek, 2008, 74 pp. (In Hebrew and Arabic)
- With Manon Slome, The Aesthetics of Terror, New York and Milan: Charta Books, 2009, 104 pp. ISBN 978-8881587278
- United States of Palestine-Israel, Berlin: Sternberg Press, 2011, 128 pp. ISBN 978-1-933128-91-7
- With Roy Chicky Arad, Good Energies – the Protocol of the Israeli Parliamentary Committee on Natural Gas Royalties, Maayan Publishing, 2011, 53 pp. [In Hebrew]
- With Roy Chicky Arad, Ronen Eidelman, Ori Ensenberg, Roni Hirsch, Efrat Mishori, Nir Nader, Yudit Shahar, Yaara Shehori, Mati Shmuelof, The Revolution Song-Book - Tents Poetry [שירון המהפכה – שירת האוהלים], Maayan Publishing in partnership with Daka, Etgar, Erev-Rav and Guerilla Culture, 2011, 109 pp. (In Hebrew)
- Ruti Sela: For The Record, Berlin: Archive Books, 2015, 224 pp. ISBN 978-3-94362-027-6
- With Ingo Niermann, Communists Anonymous, Berlin: Sternberg Press, 2017, 292 pp. ISBN 978-3-95679-349-3
- Being Together Precedes Being: A Textbook for The Kids Want Communism, Berlin: Archive Books, 2019, 392 pp. ISBN 978-3-943620-82-5

== Select Articles ==
- "Damn, We’re Sexy: Joshua Simon and Roy Chick Arad in conversation," Hamidrasha Art Journal , Issue 7: Education/Initiation, 2004 (In Hebrew)
- "Il Principe – Autobiography," Maayan Magazine for Poetry Literature and Ideas, Issue 1, Winter 2004-5 (In Hebrew)
- "Silence of the Lamps: on the films of Jos De Gruyter and Harald Thys," Afterall Journal, Issue 22, Fall 2009
- "A Certain Tendency in Israeli Cinema," Maarvon – New Film Magazine, Issue 1, Winter 2005-6 (In Hebrew) [reprinted in English online on Slash Seconds:
- "On the Aesthetics of Terror," in: Boris Groys and Peter Weibel (eds.), Medium Religion, ZKM: Center for Art and Media Karlsruhe, Autumn-Winter 2008
- "White Picket Fence: Settlement and Suburbia, Geography and Real Estate," in: Ariella Azoulay (ed.), HomeLessHome, Museum on The Seam, Jerusalem Feb. 2010
- "Neo-Materialism," three part essay on e-flux journal #20, #23, #26 (Nov. 2010; March 2011; Sep. 2011);
- "Betrayal and the Curatorial," in: Jean-Paul Martinon (ed.), The Curatorial: A Philosophy of Curating, Bloomsbury Publishing, UK, 2013
- "Shockwork: The Selfie and the Labour of the Overqualified," in: Journal, ICA, London, 2014:
- "The Overqualified," Art Handler Magazine, Issue 1, NYC, 2015
- "Debt and the Materiality of the Dividual," key note paper from the conference ‘Transversal Practices: Matter, Ecology and Relationality’, VI Conference on New Materialisms 27–29 September 2015, The Victorian College of the Arts, The University of Melbourne, Melbourne, Australia. Published in: Springerin Magazine, Vienna, Austria, January 2016 [German and English]:
- "The Dual Power of Arts Organizations," Temporary Art Review, November 2016:
- "Neoliberal Politics, Protective Edge, and BDS," in: Kareem Estefan, Carin Kuoni, Laura Raicovich (eds.), Assuming Boycott: Resistance, Agency, and Cultural Production, OR Books, NYC, 2017
- "From Value to Price, From Labor to Debt, From Revolution to Disruption," Public Seminar, The New School, NYC, Oct. 2017:
- "Soviet Knowledge," Haokets for Social Critique, Nov. 2017 (In Hebrew)
- "Phantom-Politics," in: Marina Grzinic (ed.), Border Thinking: Disassembling Histories of Racialized Violence, The Academy of Fine Arts Vienna and Sternberg Press, 2018
- "The Postman Always Rings Twice: Why Does Post-History Repeat Itself?," in: Joshua Simon (ed.) Being Together Precedes Being: A Textbook for The Kids Want Communism, Berlin: Archive Books, 2019
- "Speculation and Counter-Speculation." MaHKUscript: Journal of Fine Art Research, 3(1), p. 3, 2019:
- "Gentlemen of the Spoon: The meaning of Netanyahu," Maayan Magazine, Issue 15, Summer 2019 (In Hebrew). Appeared online on Mekomit:
- "The Way Things Are Organized: The Mesoscopic, The Metastable, The Curatorial," in: Paul O'Neill, Simon Sheikh, Lucy Steeds and Mick Wilson (eds.), Curating After The Global, MIT Press, 2019

== Select short films ==
- Push Up Teaser (teaser for feature film starring Yael Grobglas, Omer Goldman and Danielle Kitzis), 2011
- Die Unsichtbare Hand (special commission from the Zebra Poetry Film Festival, Berlin, based on a poem by Daniel Falb), 2010
- Les mots et les choses (starring Yehuda Levi, Gili Saar and Roee Rosen), 2004
- My Room (documentary short commissioned by Channel 8 for science & culture), 2002
- The Radicals (starring Yaara Sharon, Roy Chicky Arad, Michael Hanegbi, Dan Shadur, Ari Libsker, Lior Levy, Michal Shalev), 2001
- Moments (documentary commissioned by Israeli Channel 1), 2001
- City Hole (starring Iva Kafri and Tomer Persico), 1999
