= Adi Keissar =

Israeli poet

Adi Keissar עדי קיסר
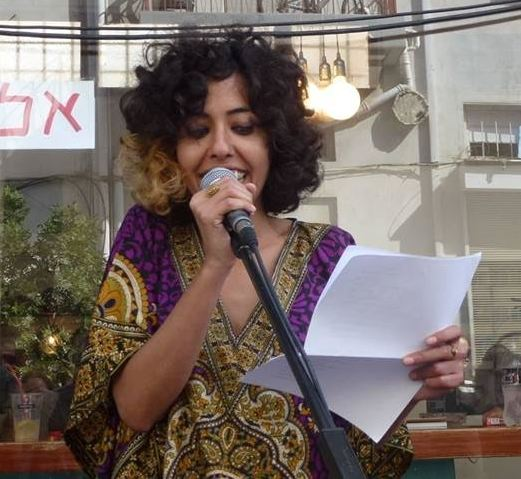
- Born: December 11, 1980 (age 45); Jerusalem
- Citizenship: Israel
- Occupation: Poet
- Years active: Since 2012
- Notable work: Black on Black; Loud Music; Chronicles

Adi Keissar (in Hebrew: עדי קיסר; born December 11, 1980) is an Israeli poet, and founder of the cultural group Ars Poetica.

== Biography ==
Keissar was born in the Gilo neighborhood of Jerusalem. She is the third of four children in her family, which is of Yemeni extraction. Her mother Ziona, is a special education teacher, and her father, Benny, is a printer. Her mother's family came to Israel in the 1950s from Yemen. Her father's family arrived from Sanaa in 1882.

From a young age, Keissar experienced bullying and discrimination because of her dark skin color, and according to her, she came to understand that she belongs to a low social status group. During her compulsory army service, she worked as an infantry instructor, and began to develop her Mizrahi identity. After an extended trip to South America and some time in New York, Keissar returned to Israel, and began working as a cultural reporter for a local Jerusalem newspaper. In 2009, she moved to Tel Aviv, and began writing for Ha'ir.

In 2017, Keissar gave birth to a daughter.

== Education ==
Keissar completed her bachelor's degree in the Humanities at the Open University in 2008. In 2010, she completed an MFA in screenwriting at Tel Aviv University.

== Career ==
Keissar started writing poetry at the age of 32, after years of reporting and screenwriting. She viewed poetry as white, elitist and unrelated to her. But after finding some poems on newspaper clippings, she became inspired. She began reading such poets as Sami Shalom Chetrit, Yona Wallach, Yehuda Amichai, Dahlia Ravikovich, Vicki Shiran, Erez Biton, and Miri Ben-Simhon - and started writing her own works. Keissar is especially concerned with changing the perception that poetry is something generally out of reach, and believes it belongs to us all. According to Keissar, poetry belongs in our homes and in the streets, not on high shelves in libraries. She says poetry that is not accessible is futile and serves no purpose. In 2017, Israel's ministry of education began including Keissar's poems in the literature curriculum, and her work is also studied in Arab-Jewish culture studies at Ben-Gurion University and Tel Aviv University.

=== Ars Poetica ===
Keissar found the typical Israeli poetry readings and spaces to be condescending and alien. In January 2013, she established poetry nights called Ars Poetica – which in Hebrew is a play on the latin phrase meaning "the art of poetry", whereas the word "Ars" also a commonly used racist epithet used towards Mizrahim. Keissar wanted to reclaim the word, and make it into a source of pride. Her original intention was to hold a single event, but it was so successful, that it became a monthly popular event.

Keissar claims that the Israeli literature canon is Ashkenazi-Western-masculine, and that feminine and Mizrahi art is marginalized and excluded from the consensus. Ars Poetica, therefore, creates a space for the marginalized to express themselves and their art publicly. Ars Poetica, according to Keissar, is a platform for social and political discourse on gender, social identity, and Israel's ethnic rift, which are generally absent from poetry meets, and from Israeli culture as a whole. The evenings are intentionally Mizrahi - including Mizrahi music, belly dancing, spoken word, and a newly formed sub-culture of Mizrahi poets, some of whom have become well-known and won national awards, such as Roy Hasan, Tehila Hakimi, Mati Shemoelof, and others. According to some culture critics, Ars Poetica has given rise to a new art stream that has shaken the world of poetry, literature and culture in Israel. Haaretz culture section has called Keissar the most influential poet working in Israel today.

=== Publication and appearances ===
Keissar's poems have appeared in a wide variety of newspapers, magazines and journals in Israel and around the world, as well as in several anthologies and multiple websites. Her work has been translated into at least eight languages. Keissar also appears and lectures in festivals and educational institutions.

Her most noted poem, "I Am the Mizrahi", which has been integrated into the national curriculum, expresses the core of her artistic thesis:

Don’t tell me how to be Mizrahi/Even if you’ve read Edward Said/Because I’m the Mizrahi/Who’s not afraid of you/Not in admissions committees/ Not in job interviews/And not in airports/ Even though you ask me/Quite a few questions/With accusing eyes/ Searching me for Arab traces/How long did you come here for/And how much cash have you got/You didn’t come here to work, right?/You didn’t come here to work, right?

== Books ==
Keissar has published three collections of her poetry:

- "Black on Black" שחור על גבי שחור (Guerrilla Tarbut, September 2014)
- "Loud Music" מוזיקה גבוהה (Ars Poetica, June 2016)
- "Chronicles" דברי הימים (Ars Poetica, 2018)

Editor:

- Ars Poetica, First Anthology - ערס פואטיקה, גרילה תרבות, May 2013
- Ars Poetica, Second Anthology - ערס פואטיקה, אסופה שנייה December 2013

== Awards ==
- 2013 – Pessach Millin Award, from the Israeli Writers Association
- 2015 – Ministry of Culture Award for emerging poets
- 2015 – Bernstein Literature Award, for Black on Black
- 2015 – "Women at the Front" award, from Saloona magazine. The award announcement included these reasons: "For breaking the rules, giving a voice to the voiceless, and turning the margins into the center while providing a professional center stage to Mizrahi artists and creating a revolution in the cultural discourse".
