= Herzliya Biennial =

The Herzliya Biennial of Contemporary Art (in Hebrew: הביאנלה בהרצליה ,הביאנליה בהרצליה לאמנות עכשווית) was an art biennial event held in the city of Herzliya, Israel, in 2007, 2009 and for the last time in 2011.

The first year that the biennial took place on September 23, 2007, with the theme of "The Rear" (in Hebrew: Ha'Oref, העורף) and is scheduled to present the works of more than 70 Israeli artists in various locations in the center of Herzliya, such as underground warehouses, storage halls, the Herzliya museum, apartments, shops and bomb shelters.

The first Herzliya Biennial curator was Joshua Simon (יהושע סימון) and its directors were Yehuda Ben Ezra and Dalia Levin.

== Manifesto ==
Inspired by other biennials such as the Gwangju Biennale, and by Israeli politics and surroundings, the opening manifesto of the Herzliya Biennial states:

"The First Herzliya Biennial of Contemporary Art will focus on presentation of works by contemporary Israeli artists who address the notion of posteriority articulated in its title, "The Rear" (Ha'Oref in Hebrew which also denotes "home front", "hinterland", "nape") in various ways: the home front as opposed the front line—civilian society in Israel versus the army; the public sphere—where society stands in relation to the state; where labor is located to capital. "The Rear" (or "home front") is a general term that surfaced repeatedly during the recent war with Lebanon in the summer of 2006, when a million Israeli citizens in the country's north sat in bomb shelters, and a million Lebanese became refugees."

== Notable artists ==
Some of the notable artists to present their works at the Herzliya Biennial are: Guy Ben-Ner, Mika Rottenberg, Roee Rosen, Yair Garbuz, Ariella Azoulay, Elisheva Levy, Gil Shani, Ari Libsker, Zoya Cherkassky, Roy Arad, Keren Cytter, Sigalit Landau and Noa Tsaushu.

== Reviews ==
The Herzliya Biennial got mixed reviews in local and foreign press.

Smadar Shefi from Haaretz wrote that the name Biennial might be a bit too provincial to use for a city like Herzliya, whether it would be biannual or not.

Anat Turisky from Ha-Ir wrote that the idea to place the mega exhibition in Herzliya was original and efficient.

The Jerusalem Post article said (quote): "Is the biennial being used as a quick fix for the organizers and curatorial staff who are presenting particular kinds of art forms and media, while making a concerted effort to bring foreign guests, critics, museum people and local aficionados of the arts from outside the Herzliya/Dan region to view the displays? This was definitely not the objective according to both (Dalia) Levin and (Joshua) Simon."
