= Nimrod Kamer =

Comedy writer and journalist

- נמרוד קמר
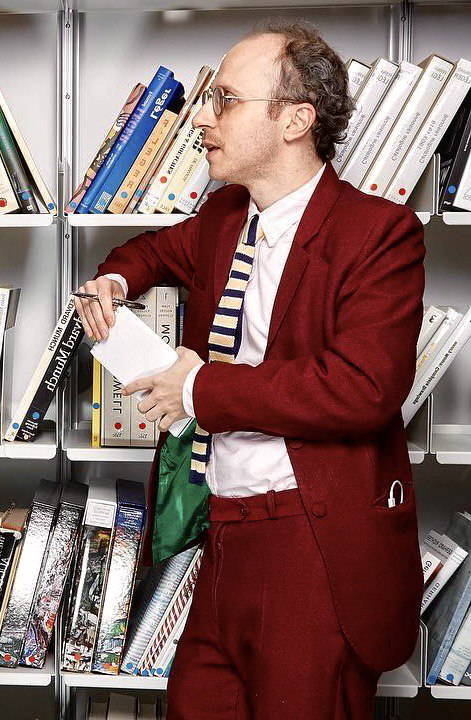
- Kamer in 2018
- Born: 1981 (age 44–45)
- Education: Sam Spiegel Film and Television School

Comedy career
- Genres: Gonzo journalism, satire

Nimrod Kamer (Hebrew: נמרוד קמר; born 1981) is a comedy writer, gonzo journalist and club crasher based in London.

== Life and career ==
Kamer was born in 1981 in Petah Tikva, Israel. Kamer claims to hold both Romanian and Israeli passports. In 2004, while attending Hebrew University of Jerusalem, Kamer and a friend were charged with painting anti-Israeli graffiti that sparked a "media sensation"; he was placed under house arrest for 10 days, served 250 hours of community service and was on probation for a year. By 2007, he was a high school teacher of cinema.

Kamer's public career started in Israel in 2005, as the Sudoku puzzle tutor known as "Captain Sudoku". In 2006, he started writing for the Hebrew-language financial newspaper Globes and contributed to the first edition of Maayan, an Israeli arts magazine edited by Roy Arad and Joshua Simon. In 2009, Kamer became social media manager of BIP, a comedy channel owned by Keshet Broadcasting. Under that channel he eventually created the comedy shows Michael and I and Jobless Nimrod.

Moving to London in 2011, Kamer started publishing periodically in film and written form on BBC Newsnight, VICE Magazine, The Guardian, Interview, Wired, The Huffington Post, London Evening Standard, SCNR, British GQ, and Fortune. In 2012 he began appearing as himself on UK's Channel 4 show Random Acts alongside Heydon Prowse. In September 2013 he presented a Guardian show titled #Thinkfluencer in association with Arte Channel.

In late 2016, Kamer began as an art editor for GQ magazine, which lasted until the early part of 2018.

On 13 July 2017, Kamer attended The Spectator magazine's summer party in Whitehall, and briefly spoke to then Prime Minister Theresa May about his concerns as a Romanian passport holder residing in the UK in the wake of Brexit. May assured him that he could stay in the country, whilst Spectator editor Fraser Nelson also reassured him, upon hearing that Kamer is also an Israeli passport holder.

== Selected spoofs, satires and journalism ==
Kamer has made several adversarial news films alongside satirical reporting.

In 2006, Kamer visited Egypt and made a five-minute documentary titled Girls at the Cairo National Stadium during one of the matches of the Africa Cup of Nations. In the film he focused on the female spectators in the crowd, which caused the Daily News Egypt to write an article called "Filming Gone Too Far?", about the ethics of filming Egyptian lady fans without permission.

In April 2012, he made a series of prank videos in which he extorted celebrities vis-á-vis vandalising their Wikipedia pages. In May 2012, he posed as a rich man and made "indecent proposals" to celebrities such as Kelly Brook attending the Cannes Film Festival. In April 2012, he appeared in the video series produced by Don't Panic, dressed in an old lord outfit whilst arriving at the House of Lords to claim various expenses (Lords are reimbursed for expenses). He "purchased" land in Scotland, a token amount for £29.99, which presumably made him a de facto lord. In October 2012, Kamer created a fake Obama Kenya birth video to highlight the "Birthers" and Donald Trump's obsession with getting an old 8mm footage of the US president's alleged African birth.

During 2013, he created a fake TED Talk with Billie JD Porter to ridicule the TED apparatus and satirise individuals and companies who use Wikipedia for profit. It was embedded on Gawker. In March 2013, he reported on the new "finger hashtag" in Wired magazine.

In June 2014, Kamer joined Katharine Hamnett to perform a stunt outside Hackney Town Hall, aiming to make Hackney Mayor Jules Pipe ban all Monsanto Roundup herbicides being used in the borough. In July 2014, Kamer travelled to Nassau to investigate a leak by Edward Snowden that suggested the NSA listen to phone calls made in the Bahamas. He spoke with local ministers, parliament members and attended a local Freedom of Information rally. In December 2014, Business Insider reported on Kamer's satirical quest to become the worst rated passenger in Uber's history.

Kamer has been described as "the doyen of club-crashers". His article "The Art of Getting In" is a satirical piece on clever ways to get into members-only events and locations normally reserved for the rich and (almost)-famous, which he calls a "new form of class warfare". His first piece as a regulator contributor to Air Mail magazine is a guide depicting the various ways to enter Mar-a-Lago without a membership.

== Other works ==
In November 2015, Kamer and German novelist Delilah Jay released a song entitled "It's A Boy" with the hope of representing the United Kingdom in the upcoming Eurovision Song Contest 2016. Eurovision news source Wiwibloggs published the story. Kamer also hosted The Golden News Shower on Fair Planet, directed by William Pine and commissioned by Joseph Reich.

In 2018, The Social Climber's Handbook: A Shameless Guide by Kamer was published through BIS Publishing, with illustrations by Charlie Behrens (son of Timothy Behrens).
