= Roy Arad =

Israeli writer and activist (born 1977)

Roy "Chicky" Arad רועי "צ'יקי" ארד
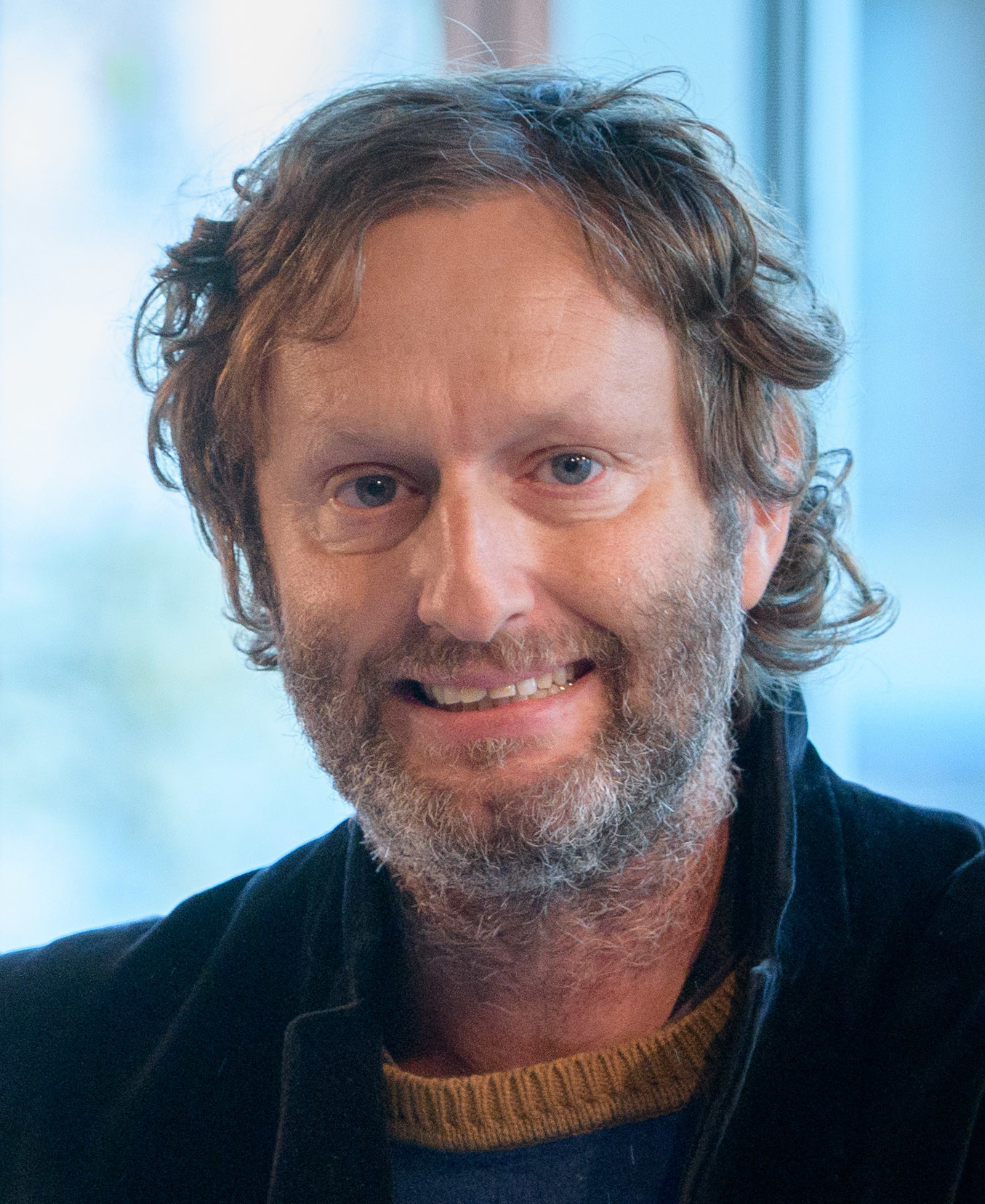

Background information
- Born: January 5, 1977 (age 49)
- Origin: Israel
- Genres: Poetry; Music
- Occupations: Poet; Singer; Script-writer; Artist; Political activist
- Formerly of: PingPong
- Writing career
- Notable works: The Israeli Dream; The Pelican

Roy "Chicky" Arad (Hebrew: רועי "צ'יקי" ארד; born 5 January 1977) is an Israeli poet, singer, script-writer, artist, and political activist. Arad is the founder and former editor of Maayan magazine for poetry and a former journalist for Haaretz.

== Poetry and Literature ==
Arad has published eight books. He formed a style that he called "Kimo" and defined as "a Hebrew adaptation of the Japanese Haiku": it consists of three lines of 10, 7, and 6 syllables. It usually describes one frozen scene that has no movement in it, and in practice, the content of the poems is close to Senryū. As an author, Arad published the book "The Israeli Dream" (Xargol-Am Oved) in 2010, "The Pelican" (Xargol-Modan) in 2013, and many short stories. In 2016, "The Israeli Dream" was chosen on Mako website as one of the ten best Israeli books of the 21st century.

Arad's poem "The Owl" which deals with the destruction of the Israeli urban city center in favor of a giant shopping mall, "The Negev Mall", interlacing elements of ancient eastern Gods, was a part of Michal Helfman's work in the Venice Biennale 2003. In 2007, a translation was published in the USA at "In Our Own Words", an anthology of young writers. He was one of the editors of three poetry anthologies: "Aduma" (the red) of socialist contemporary poetry, "Latzet" (go out) against the 2009 war in Gaza, and "The Revolution Songbook" following the social protest of summer 2011. As the publisher of Maayan, he edited several poetry books of young writers such as Vaan Nguyen's Eye of the Truffle.

Arad is co-editor (with Joshua Simon) of Maayan magazine Israeli periodical for poetry, literature, and ideas and of New&Bad Art Magazine. In July 2009, his poem, "The Night's End Anthem" was performed by the Tel Aviv philharmonic orchestra by Zubin Mehta with the music of Ella Sheriff for 100 years to Tel Aviv. Along with Mati Shemoelof, Aharon Shabtai, and Almog Behar, Arad is a key member of Guerrilla Tarbut, a group of Israeli poets and artists striving to promote social and political causes through poetry and music.

At the end of July 2009, Arad participated in the San Francisco International Poetry Festival and had a show with the influential musician Jonathan Richman. Some of Arad's poems were translated into Arabic and published in Lebanon and Egypt. In March 2012 he co-curated the exhibition Iran – The Exhibition, in opposition to Israeli government plans to go to war with Iran, and that seemed to have succeeded in saying something about Israeli-American security paranoia. As a poet and author, his texts were translated into several languages and were published in several magazines, from English and Spanish Granta to French REVU and Plaine Page. Roy Chicky Arad participated in literary and poetry festivals in San Francisco, Sete (France), Rosario (argentine), Toledo (Spain), Berlin and had a residency in the International Writing Program in Iowa City.

== Publications ==
- Hakooshi, Shadurian, 2000 (Novelettes and Kimo Poetry)
- Aerobic, Shadurian, 2003. Editor: Roee Wolman (a Novel)
- Paintings and Poetry 2000–2003, Shadurian and Tal Esther Gallery (Art and Kimo Poetry)
- Guns and Credit Cards, Plonit, 2009 (poetry)
- The Israeli Dream, Xargol-Am Oved, 2010. Editor: Eli Hirsch (Novelettes)
- Right Wage, Maayan, 2013 (a Novelette)
- The Pelican, Xargol-Modan, 2013. Editor: Eli Hirsch (a Novel)
- The Aircraft Carrier, Maayan, 2014. Editor: Aharon Shabtai (Poetry)
- The Coffee Book, Maayan Intl, 2019. Editor: Chamini Kulathunga (Poetry)

== Music ==
In 2000 Roy's band "Ping Pong" represented Israel in the Eurovision Song Contest in Sweden with the song Sameach. At the close of voting the song had received 7 points, placing 22nd in a field of 24. The song lyrics mentioned a friend from Damascus who dates an Israeli girl. The band was dis-endorsed by the Israel Broadcasting Authority after waving the flag of Syria during the rehearsal and the video-clip of the song. They refused to back down for the performance in the final and pulled the flag out live.

In 2002 Arad released "Sonol" ("Ra Records", Israel, Produced by Ram Orion). In 2004 Arad released "Tourists, come to Israel, it's a Nice Country". On January 7, 2005, he released two different albums in the same day: "Monster" (Comfortstand) with French musician Chenard Walcker, and "Sputnik in Love" under the Dutch label WM Recordings.

Some of Arad's music is political. In July 2005 Arad released "I Vanunu" with Chenard Walcker (Freesamplezone, Paris), named after the nuclear technician Mordechai Vanunu who was imprisoned for releasing information about the Israeli nuclear weapons program. The video clip to the title song was shot in Ramallah. In 2006 Arad released his fifth solo album, "Good Friends" (Birdsong, Israel). In August 2006, Arad released a song against the war in Lebanon. In 2002, Arad was one of the organizers of "Rave against the occupation", a line of parties protesting against the Israeli policy during Second Intifada.

== Journalism and scriptwriting ==
Arad was an editor of "Firma", a supplement in Globes between 2000 till 2009. Since 2010 Arad is a journalist in Haaretz, writing about social issues in Gonzo Journalism style. Arad participated in the blog of London Review of Books. Arad was the scriptwriter for the satirical television series Toffee and the Gorilla that aired in 2007 on the private Israeli comedy channel, Bip (channel). and directed a documentary movie about the death of construction workers in Israel. In September 2020, Due to allegations of sexual misconduct with women, one of them under the age of consent, Arad has resigned from his positions in Haaretz and Maayan magazine.

== Film ==
In 1999 to 2001 Arad appeared in City Hole and The Radicals, both films directed by Joshua Simon .

== See also ==
- Ari Libsker
- Joshua Simon
