= Miri Ben-Simhon =

Israeli poet, literary editor (1950 - 1996)

- מירי בן-שמחון
- Born: 13 January 1950; Marseille, France
- Died: 24 June 1996 (aged 46); Israel
- Occupation: Poet
- Years active: 1975–1996

Miri Ben-Simhon (Hebrew: מירי בן-שמחון; 13 January 1950 – 24 June 1996) was an Israeli poet.

== Biography ==
Miri Ben-Simhon was born in a transit camp in Marseille, France, while her parents, Zehava and Haim Ben-Simhon, were on their way from Fez, Morocco to Israel, the youngest of their three children. The family was placed in a transit camp in Jerusalem, and later moved to the Katamon neighborhood of Jerusalem. According to a critical anthology of essays about Ben-Simhon, she was a bright student and identified in elementary school as having a gift for literature. Her father abandoned the family when Ben-Simhon was young. Her mother then married an immigrant from Italy, which broadened her cultural horizons.

Ben-Simhon did her military service in an intelligence unit and worked for two years in the secret security services. After witnessing things that disturbed her deeply, she left the service. She studied Hebrew Literature at the Hebrew University of Jerusalem and acting at the Beit Zvi dramatic arts academy in Tel Aviv. After graduation she worked for an advertising agency, wrote for the local newspaper "Jerusalem," and worked as a translator and editor.

Several episodes of mental illness led to hospitalization at the Talbiya psychiatric hospital in Jerusalem. She was in a long-term relationship with novelist Shimon Zimmer.

On 24 June 1996, Ben-Simhon was killed in a car crash.

== Literary career ==
Ben-Simhon started writing at age 25. She wrote short stories and poems, and also translated poems into Hebrew. Her first collection, Interested Not Interested, was published in 1983. She published four volumes of poetry. In addition, her poems were included in anthologies, and some were translated to English.

Ben-Simhon's work deals with issues relating to gender, ethnicity, class, culture and politics. She writes about being a Mizrahi woman in Israel, and about being a Mizrahi poet in an Ashkenazi literary world. Her poetry has been called "sensitive and brutal, personal and political," and also "fascinating, sharp and in particular, very intelligent." She wrote about racial stigmas, about societal power relations, about growing up poor, and living in a society where you "cannot gain entrance by being good", because you do not have the correct identity profile.

A great deal of her poetry dealt with significant relationships in her life: For example, her friendship and collegial relationship with Israeli poet Amira Hess, which spanned over 20 years, found its way into both women's books and poetry. Other poets whose work touched on hers in some way include that of her life-partner writer Shimon Zimmer, and poets Oded Peleg and Balfour Hakak.

Israeli poet Meir Wieseltier also loomed large in her life. Many of the poems in Interested Not Interested are about her feelings for him, although little is known about the nature of this relationship and it may have been fantasy. Her life-partner, Shimon Zimmer, says that Ben-Simhon occasionally went to his house and tried to confront him. "I think one time a window was broken and he called the police." So much of what she wrote may have been a product of her imagination. Mutual acquaintances said that Wieseltier treated her in a condescending manner, and according to researcher and poet Mati Shemoelof, it is far from coincidental that one of her best-known poems in this collection is about the inferior status of a Mizrahi woman and the stereotypical way Mizrahi women are sexualized and dismissed as uninformed and unintelligent. Critic Eli Hirsch disagrees: "Attempting to attribute a central role to Wieseltier not only in her biography but also in the understanding of her poetry seems problematic to me. Wieseltier seems to mostly be a kind of hook on which the poet hung her yearning for a father. Much more significant is the influence of other women poets on the poetry of Ben-Simhon – Yona Wallach, and Hess, a friend of Ben-Simhon, who shared the heavy burden of Mizrahi women's poetry in those years."

== Commemoration ==
In 2017, a documentary film about Ben-Simhon's life, Miriam's Song (Ahava Mitrageshet Lavo) was created by filmmakers Eldad Boganim and Israel Winkler, with screenwriter Dan Albo. The film includes a recording from 1988, which was discovered by chance, after her death, in which Ben-Simhon reads a love letter to the poet Meir Wieseltier. The letter, the heart of this film, offers a glimpse at Ben-Simhon's ruptured soul.

== Published works ==
- מעוניינת לא מעוניינת, הוצאת הקיבוץ המאוחד, תל אביב, 1983. Interested Not Interested
- שבלת דקה בכד חרס עתיק, אל"ף, תל אביב, 1985. A Thin Wheat-Stalk in an Ancient Clay Jar
- צמא, ספרית הפועלים, תל אביב, 1990. Thirst
- אקזיסטנציאליזם חרד, הוצאת כרמל, ירושלים, 1998. Anxious Existentialism. Published posthumously.

In 2018, an anthology of all her works, with some additional poems from her estate, was published:

- רק האויר בחוץ שגיא, גמא, תל אביב 2018 Only the Air Outside is Exalted
