= Tehila (given name) =

- Language: Hebrew

Origin
- Meaning: Glory, praise

Other names
- Variant forms: Tehilla, Tehillah

Tehila, also spelled Tehilla or Tehillah (Hebrew: תְּהִלָּה or תהילה), is a Hebrew feminine name meaning "glory" or "praise". It is derived from the Hebrew word תְּהִלָּה} (tehillah) meaning "praise, song or hymn of praise", which itself is derived from הָלַל (halal) meaning "to shine; to praise, boast, be boastful".

== People with the name ==
- Tehilla Blad (born 1995), Swedish actress, singer, swimmer and ballet dancer
- Tehila Hakimi (born 1982), Israeli poet and author
- Tehila Friedman (born 1976), Israeli lawyer and politician
- Tehilla Lichtenstein (1893–1973), co-founder and leader of Jewish Science

== See also ==
- Tehila (disambiguation)
