= Kedma =

Kedma (Hebrew: קדמה) may refer to:

- Kedma (film), a film directed by Amos Gitai
- Kedma, Israel, a village in south-central Israel
- Kedma School, an alternative secondary school in Jerusalem
