= D. A. Levy =

American poet (1942–1968)

d.a. levy

d.a. levy (October 29, 1942 – November 24, 1968), born Darryl Alfred Levey (later changed to Darryl Allen Levy), was an American poet, artist, and alternative publisher active during the 1960s, based in Cleveland, Ohio. He consistently signed his work with lower-case letters.

== Biography ==
Levy was born to Joseph J. and Carolyn Levey on Cleveland's near West side. Toward the end of his high school years and later, after a short stint in the Navy, Levy decided to read everything and write everything, and lose himself in the search for infinity. He later found a creative outlet in publishing on a small printing press. During this time he also discovered an important spiritual outlet in Buddhism, though Jewish by birth.

He published his own and others' works, printed on his hand press, or in mimeographed editions through his Renegade Press and Seven Flowers Press. His intense awareness of the gritty and burgeoning art scene of Cleveland, which included drugs and sex, and his need to express this scene which he felt a way of attaining enlightenment, meant that he was not welcome in the political environment.

=== Obscenity trial ===
In 1966, he was indicted for distributing obscene poetry to minors. He was arrested again in 1967, and his pressing materials confiscated. In a comment to then Cleveland Plain Dealer reporter Gene I. Maeroff, Levy said "It's absolutely not obscene," he said. "And even if it were I wouldn't care. You can go anywhere in this city and pick up something published by Grove Press or girlie or nudist magazines. The cops aren't bothering them." The case attracted wide attention, and prompted a benefit reading on May 14, 1967, on the Case Institute of Technology campus which featured such figures as Allen Ginsberg, Tuli Kupferberg and the Fugs.

The case dragged on for a year, but in 1968 the prosecutor agreed to drop the obscenity charges against Levy and bookseller James Russell Lowell, proprietor of Cleveland's Asphodel bookstore (who had also been charged). Levy's lawyer convinced him to plead no contest to the charges of tending to contribute to the delinquency of minors, and Levy agreed to pay a $200 fine and no longer associate with juveniles or give them his poetry."

=== Death ===
He died of a self-inflicted gunshot wound to the head on November 24, 1968, at the age of 26. He was cremated, and half his ashes are buried in Whitehaven Memorial Park in Mayfield Heights, Ohio. Some ashes remain in the charge of Cleveland Heights artist George Fitzpatrick, who intends to work them into a calligraphic painting of Levy's words.

There is a conjecture in a book by Mike Golden that Levy was murdered by the Cleveland police or local government because of his anti-establishment writings, but this controversy died down shortly after publication, and is only maintained by those far-removed from the poetry community. Those who knew Levy first-hand reject the idea of anything but a suicide. Levy often talked about suicide. Russ Salamon, a friend of Levy and fellow Cleveland poet, gave Levy large stacks of books, replenishing them when necessary, knowing Levy would finish the texts, and therefore remain a little while longer on this earth. For the last three years of his life, Levy was fond of saying he would like to leave the city, the country, and go to "Israel" (is real).

== Published works ==
Levy is most known for The North American Book of the Dead, Cleveland Undercovers, and Suburban Monastery Death Poem, and in the last years of the 20th century his Tombstone as a Lonely Charm found a new following.

During 1967 and 1968, Levy published Cleveland's first underground newspaper, the Buddhist Third-Class Junkmail Oracle.

In 1968 he also helped edit and wrote for the single issue of The Marijuana Review (New York).

His earliest poems were almost all in lowercase, and would appear to some to be lacking in focus. In his mimeographs of his writings (which could be considered an early form of zine), the poetry is sometimes misspelled. This could be style, error or perhaps it boils down to mimeo method, as correcting the stencils was laborious.

Levy also explored concrete poetry. In works such as "The Tibetan Stroboscope" he used the low fidelity copies produced by the mimeograph to create images of distorted and illegible text, combining these with collaged images of Buddhist artworks and cut-up phrases from commercial magazines such as "NIBBANA IS NOT AN Air-conditioned Salesroom."

As Levy got more involved in both Buddhism and Cleveland, his poems got more playful at times, used spelling "mistakes" and syntax "errors" carrying multiple meanings, and other effects, and did not shy away from long lines of capital letters.

In 2011, 43 years after his death, two of Levy's poems were translated to Hebrew and were published in Maayan, Israeli magazine of poetry .

=== An example of levy's work ===
Here is a small sample from The North American Book of the Dead. Note the nouns placed next to each other with no verbs, and contrasting loaded images with the ordinary, the alignment of the text on the surface, and the use of caps.

it disappears when i know i am there
images
color images
negative images
trucks cars cunts flowers birds
light jade ivory sculpture
places no-places temples thighs
cities casts flashes
roses clouds eye EYE
chaos
NOT THAT NOT THAT
