= Maayan (magazine) =

Israeli literary magazine

Maayan מעין
- Editors: Roy Arad, Joshua Simon
- Categories: Poetry, Art, culture, literature
- Frequency: Semi-Annually
- Founded: 2005; 21 years ago
- Company: Maayan Association
- Country: Israel
- Based in: Tel Aviv
- Language: Hebrew
- Website: www.maayanmagazine.com

Maayan (in Hebrew: מעין) is an Israeli magazine for poetry, literature, art, and ideas. Its first issue appeared in 2005 and was named for Maayan Strauss.

== History ==
Maayan is edited by Roy Arad and Joshua Simon. The magazine is a forum for poetry and art from Israel (Jewish and Arab) and beyond. From the opening statement of issue #1: "In its journey to the shelves, Maayan's poetic proposal entails a risk: according to preconceived standards, it is not clear if it qualifies as poetry at all. Maayan's poets write, like a child riding a tricycle through heavy traffic ..."

The second issue of Maayan was released in December 2005, and was twice as big. It included a film magazine Maarvon.

Maayan's fourth issue came out in March 2008. It featured over 300 pages and 40 new writers, making it 70 plus contributors all together with the visual artists. From vol. 3 opening arguments: "... In Maayan we apply the politics of first name. Maayan, bottom line, is a name of a girl. The state of the Israeli language and discourse today demands first name politics as opposed to metaphorical and hollow trademarks such not calling the summer "feud" between Israel and Lebanon what it was – a war, and calling Israel's ruling party Kadima and meaningless name instead of "The National Responsibility" as it was meant to be named, because of PR consideration. Maayan – for better and for worse hales for the concrete. The words in the magazine are not a mere shadow of the events, happenings and reality, they try to describe and tell what is, specifically as possible. The Bombing of the Gaza Strip, the 2006 Lebanon War and the disappointment from Amir Peretz are weaved and integrated throughout its pages."

Maayan is published in 4000 copies.

== Maarvon ==
Maarvon (in Hebrew: מערבון) is a film supplement to Maayan edited by Joshua Simon.

The cover of the 1st issue was The World, film by Chinese director Jia Zhangke. The cover story of the 2nd issue was a shot from the 1971 marginalised film Punishment Park by Peter Watkins that followed an article by Amy Taubin on the film. Other articles were on the unique genre of Hotel Cinema – Israeli comedic films shot in the 70s in hotel rooms and lobbies by Yoni Raz Portugali, an article on Avi Mograbi's representation of suffering Palestinians in his self-representing works by Shmulik Duvdevani, and also Ramle one-held-hand made films by high school students by Nimrod Kamer and all together 20 articles. Maarvon and Maayan faces the middle east reality with several articles. In Maarvon #2 there a translation of an article on the Lebanese film Bosta – a precedent in feature films in the region made by local money rather than western.

Issue #1 of Maarvon dealt with Mon Tresor of Keren Yedaya, Jaffa in Menahem Golan movies, the Israeli gay cinema between Amos Guttman and Eytan Fox, after Good Boys (Yair Hochner), political telenovelas in Latin America, and Jia Zhangke movies.

Maarvon in Hebrew means western. A quote from its first issue opening statement:"for us films are not only themselves, but the entire discourse and culture that surrounds them."

The first article in Maarvon vol. 1 is called "A Certain Tendency in Israeli Cinema" by Joshua Simon, he examines Israeli cinema and the Aesthetics of feature films sponsored by film funds, a growing European and International trend of Peripheral Mainstream.

== The New&Bad Magazine ==
The New&Bad Magazine (in Hebrew: החדש והרע) is an art magazine named after a quote of Bertolt Brecht "Don't start from the good old things but from the bad new ones". The magazine deals with the Israeli and international art scene. The editors are Natalie Levin, with Arad and Simon. The contributors are David Adika, Gil Shani, Fahed Halabi, Tamir Lichtenberg, Galia Yahav, Kochavit Kdoshim, Pesach Slabosky and many more.

== Renowned contributors ==
- Ari Libsker
- Nimrod Kamer
- Joshua Simon

== Other activities ==
In June 2006 at the Minshar gallery in Tel Aviv, Maayan creators put on an exhibition named "Doron" (after CEO of O.R.S. human resources Doron Sabag – aka first names), which dealt with the relations of art and labour rights.

In March 2012, Maayan curators put on an exhibition named "Iran" in "Spaceship Gallery" against the war with Iran. The exhibition included a wax effigy of Ehud Barak called 'The Most Dangerous Person in the World', and a video about the Israeli Air Force attacking Poland today. The curators had to move Guy Briller's installation on the roof of the gallery, so it didn't look like a missile pointing at the neighbouring U.S. embassy.

In July 2007 Maayan Group representatives went to the Syrian Embassy in Amman in order to apply for a special Visa to Syria to promote peace between Israel and Syria.

Maayan Group, with Guerrilla Tarbut organization, held a joint poetry protest in order to support the "Coffee To Go" waitresses union. After a month-long strike the waitresses got their way and the university coffee branch decided to let them have their tips and workers rights, while keeping their job. Some of the poems were taken from recently published "Aduma" social poetry booklet, 2007. a same event happened in Polgat textile factory in Kiryat Gat after the closing of the factory, under Akirov Tower, the divisive residency of Ehud Barak, the Israeli defense minister, while 2008–2009 Israel–Gaza conflict and in support of the "science garden"'s workers at Weizmann Institute of Science in the city of Rehovot. Among the poets who protested were Aharon Shabtai, Eran Hadas, Mati Shemoelof, Yuval Ben-Ami and Yudit Shahar.

== See also ==
- List of literary magazines
