= Marwan Makhoul =

Palestinian poet

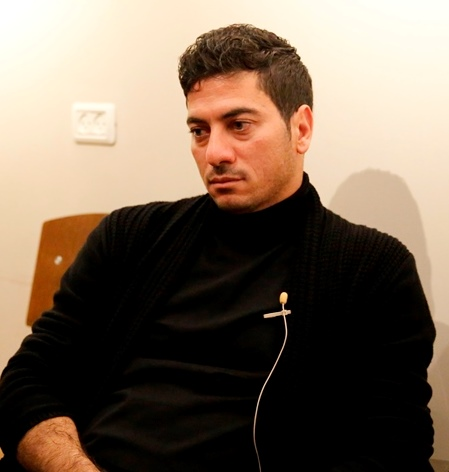
Marwan Mahkhoul in 2014

Marwan Makhoul (born 1979) is a Palestinian civil engineer and writer.

He was born in the village of Al-Buqay‘a in Upper Galilee. He is the managing director of a construction company, and also has published prose works and plays. Several of his poems have been set to music and performed by leading figures in Palestinian and Arab music. His work is closely linked to his homeland, and lines from one of his poems are often used as a rallying cry in protests around the world against Israel's war on Palestine.

== Writing ==
Makhoul's poetry deals with the marginalization of Arab citizens in the state of Israel, and with questions of personal and national identity. Much of his work addresses the marginalization of the Arab community there and the poet explores questions related to the recognition and non-recognition of Palestinians in that state, as well as questions of identity – both personal and national.

He no longer believes that there are rigid forms of prose and poetry and his work draws from everyday speech as well as abstract forms of language. He recites his poetry in a chant-like manner, and is often accompanied by singers and musicians.

Makhoul has said of his work: 'I am a voice that tells the public about their identity, and what we have done to preserve that identity, as Palestinians, as Arabs.'

== Publications ==
Collections of his poetic works appear as: 'Hunter of Daffodils', 'Land of the Sad Passiflora', 'Verses the Poems Forgot with Me', 'Where Is My Mother?' (Often rendered as 'Where Is My Mom?'), and 'A Letter from the Last Man'.

A selection of his poems, translated into French by Chakib Ararou and titled 'Que le bombardier se taise'/ ' Let the Bomber Be Silent ', is published by La Kainfristanaise.

His first play, 'This Isn't Noah's Ark', won the best playwright award at The Acre Theatre Festival in 2009.

His work has appeared in collections, including:

- The Tent Generations. Palestinian Poems. Mohammed Sawaie (ed). (Banipal Books, 2022)
- Out of Gaza. New Palestinian Poetry (Smokestack Books, 2024)

Various Irish-language poets translated his work into Irish in 2024, including Eibhlís Carcione, Louis de Paor, and Áine Ní Fhoghludha, which were read at an IMRAM event. The Irish translations were made from English versions. His poetry has also been translated into Turkish, Italian, German, French, Hebrew, Serbian, Hindi, Polish, Dutch, Albanian, Macedonian, Portuguese, Amharic, Eastern Armenian, Bangla, Hindi, Telugu, Tamil, Malayalam, Marathi, Russian, and Urdu.

During the 2023 Gaza war, a poem of his was adopted as a slogan to call for an end to the targeting of civilians, and was repeated worldwide:

"in order for me to write poetry that isn’t / political, I must listen to the birds / and in order to hear the birds / the warplanes must be silent."
