= Linda Menuhin =

Iraqi-born Israeli journalist

- ليندا عبد العزيز
- Born: Linda Abdul Aziz; 1950 (age 74–75); Baghdad, Iraq
- Other names: Linda Abdul Aziz Menuhin, Linda Menuhin Abdul Aziz, Linda Menuhin Abdul–Aziz, Linda Abu Aziz Menuhin
- Occupation(s): Journalist, editor, blogger
- Father: Yaakub Abdul Aziz

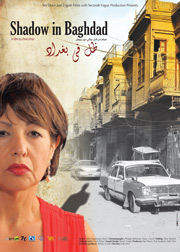
Poster for 2013 Israeli documentary film Shadow in Baghdad

Linda Abdul Aziz Menuhin (Arabic: ليندا عبد العزيز, Hebrew: לינדה מנוחין; born 1950) is an Iraqi-born Israeli journalist, editor, and blogger who has written for Arab news. Menuhin was a refugee to Israel in the 1970s and has been nicknamed, the "Anne Frank of Iraq". She previously served as head of the Middle East desk and commentator on Arab affairs on Arabic television channel 1. She was the subject of the 2013 Israeli documentary film Shadow in Baghdad, directed by Duki Dror.

== Biography ==
Menuhin was born in 1950 in Baghdad, Iraq into an Arab Jewish family. After the Six-Day War in 1967, the Jews of Baghdad became targets. At the age of 21, she fled to Israel via Pahlavi Iran with her brother. A few months later her mother and sister did the same route, leaving her father behind. When she first arrived in Israel in 1971, there was a struggle for people to understand the history of Jews in Iraq and she has expressed feeling like, "there was no room for the Arab culture in Israel" during that time.

In 1972 her father, Yaakub Abdul Aziz, a prominent lawyer in Iraq, was abducted by government agents and was never heard of again. In the following years in Iraq, Saddam Hussein was put into power, by which point many of Baghdad's Jews had fled, were missing, or had been killed.

The film Shadow in Baghdad is about Menuhin's family and trying to answer some of the unsolved mysteries around her father’s disappearance and the disappearance of Baghdad's Jewish population.

In 1981, Menuhin started working for Arabic television on Channel 1 (Israel), first as a magazine editor and later as head of the Middle East desk. She later worked as a consultant with the Israeli Ministry of Foreign Affairs for the Arabic digital media.

== See also ==
- Baghdadi Jews
- History of the Jews in Iraq
