= Shadow in Baghdad =

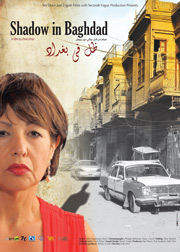
- Directed by: Duki Dror
- Produced by: Duki Dror; Paul Saadoun; Yael Shavit
- Starring: Linda Abdul Aziz Menuhin
- Cinematography: Philippe Bellaiche
- Edited by: Chen Shelach
- Release date: October 9, 2013
- Running time: 70 minutes
- Country: Israel
- Languages: Arabic, Hebrew, English

Shadow in Baghdad is a 2013 documentary film directed by Duki Dror. The film chronicles the story of Linda Abdul Aziz Menuhin, an Israeli citizen who fled her native Iraq in the 1970s, and her connection with a young Iraqi journalist who reaches out to her in an effort to help her trace the disappearance of her father in Iraq shortly after she fled the country. The film takes place between Israel, Iraq and Jordan.

The film was first released in Haifa Film Festival and was one of the reasons that led to the rise of public interest in Israel and around world, in the story of the disappearance of Jews from Arab lands. The film was screened in the US Library of Congress in Washington with the opening of the exhibition of the Iraqi Jewish Archive in the National Archive.

== Synopsis ==
Shadow in Baghdad opens with Menuhin, a freelance journalist for Arabic-language news outlets, crossing from Israel into Jordan in an ultimately unsuccessful attempt to vote in Iraq's 2010 presidential elections. Though Menuhin begins the day optimistic about her ability to participate in the elections as an Iraqi, she is held by the Iraqi authorities at the poll station until the Jordanian security services intervene. Upon returning to Israel, Menuhin blogs about her experiences in Jordan and is then contacted by an Iraqi journalist who takes interest in her story and that of her father, Yaakoub Abdul Aziz, who disappeared in Iraq decades earlier. As the connection between the two journalists deepen, they delve further and further into Menuhin's past, as well as that of the Iraqi-Jewish community, in an attempt to find clues as to what may have happened to her father. As the two struggle to pick up traces of her father, the Iraqi journalist takes to the streets of Baghdad, combing the Al Musbah district where Menuhin once lived with her family. Meanwhile, in Israel, Menuhin also pays visits to former members of the Iraqi-Jewish community of Baghdad, those who knew her father before themselves fleeing for Israel, to try and better understand the circumstances under which her father would have disappeared.
