= Tehila Hakimi =

Israeli poet

Tehila Hakimi תהילה חכימי
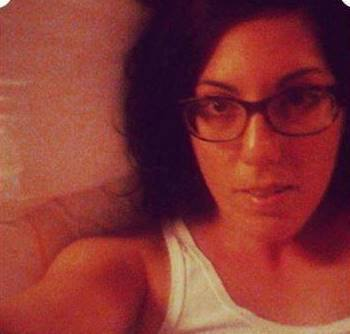
- Occupations: Poet, author

Tehila Hakimi (Hebrew: תהילה חכימי; born February 27, 1982) is an Israeli poet and author.

== Writing ==
Hakimi, who has a degree in mechanical engineering, began publishing her poetry in 2013, in the journals "Merhav" and "Ma'ayan", and in two anthologies – a collection of poems from Beersheba, and the second Ars Poetica anthology, edited by Adi Keissar.

Her first poetry collection, We’ll Work Tomorrow (מחר נעבוד) came out in 2014. The book won the Bernstein Literature Award for 2015.

Hakimi edited the children's book Afternoon Kids (Tangier, 2015) by Avihai Nizri, illustrated by Liron Cohen.

Her second book, In the Water, is a graphic novel, created in collaboration with illustrator Liron Cohen; it was published in 2016.

Hakimi's next book, her first published prose work, is Company. The word in Hebrew, Hevra means company as translated to English – both in the commercial sense and as in 'keeping company' – but it also means 'society'. The book deals with the minutiae as well as all the big questions of a body in the never-ending cycle of 21st century work – from a woman's perspective, outlining the expected aspects of corporate work, with the additional aspects of sexual harassment, taking care of home and children, and other issues, as Hakimi stated: "The world of work was planned for the work of men. A woman at work is a priori a strange thing. It isn't just because she has another internal cycle. From salaries to opportunities for advancement, through the issues of everyday maltreatment and harassment – workplaces are still not equal for women."

In his review in Ha'aretz, Amos Noy wrote: "Great literature is created at the meeting point between experience and language. And 'Company', Tehila Hakimi's new book, is great literature in my opinion." Yoni Livne, writing for ynet, opined, "This is what would result if Kubric and Bowie worked in an office." Neta Amit, in the online feminist magazine Politically Corret, wrote: "She is telling us... Don't make me choose; I am a woman and a mechanical engineer. A Mizrahi, and a poet. An engineer and an author. This expectation that we must choose – one profession, one identity – is meant to actually fit us into a mold that is comfortable for (the patriarchal, capitalistic) society. To fit you into a box, which will more than likely reduce you, but will enable the 'Company' [society] to embrace you."

Hakimi received the Emerging Poets Award from the Ministry of Culture in 2015. Among the reasons cited for the award:

"Her poems indicate that her watchful eye and her sensitive gaze miss no detail, and give no quarter. The narrator in her poems lives her life, but does not like what she sees or what happens to her in the world she lives in. Her critiques, even regarding well-recognized injustices, are expressed through her unique, clear vision."

== Books ==
- 2014 – מחר נעבוד, (Tomorrow We Work, Tangier publishing)
- 2016 – במים, (In the Water)
- 2018 – חֶבְרָה, (Company, Resling – Original Israeli Literature series)

== Awards ==
- 2015 – Ministry of Culture Emerging Poets Award
- 2015 – 2nd place, "Songs Along the Way" contest, Municipality of Tel Aviv (for her poem "Jacob")
- 2015 – Bernstein Literature Award, for her first poetry collection, Tomorrow We Work
- 2018 – Fulbright scholarship, to attend the international writing program at University of Iowa
- 2018 – The Prime Minister's Prize for Hebrew Literary Works
