= Duki Dror =

Israeli film director (born 1963)

- דוקי דרור
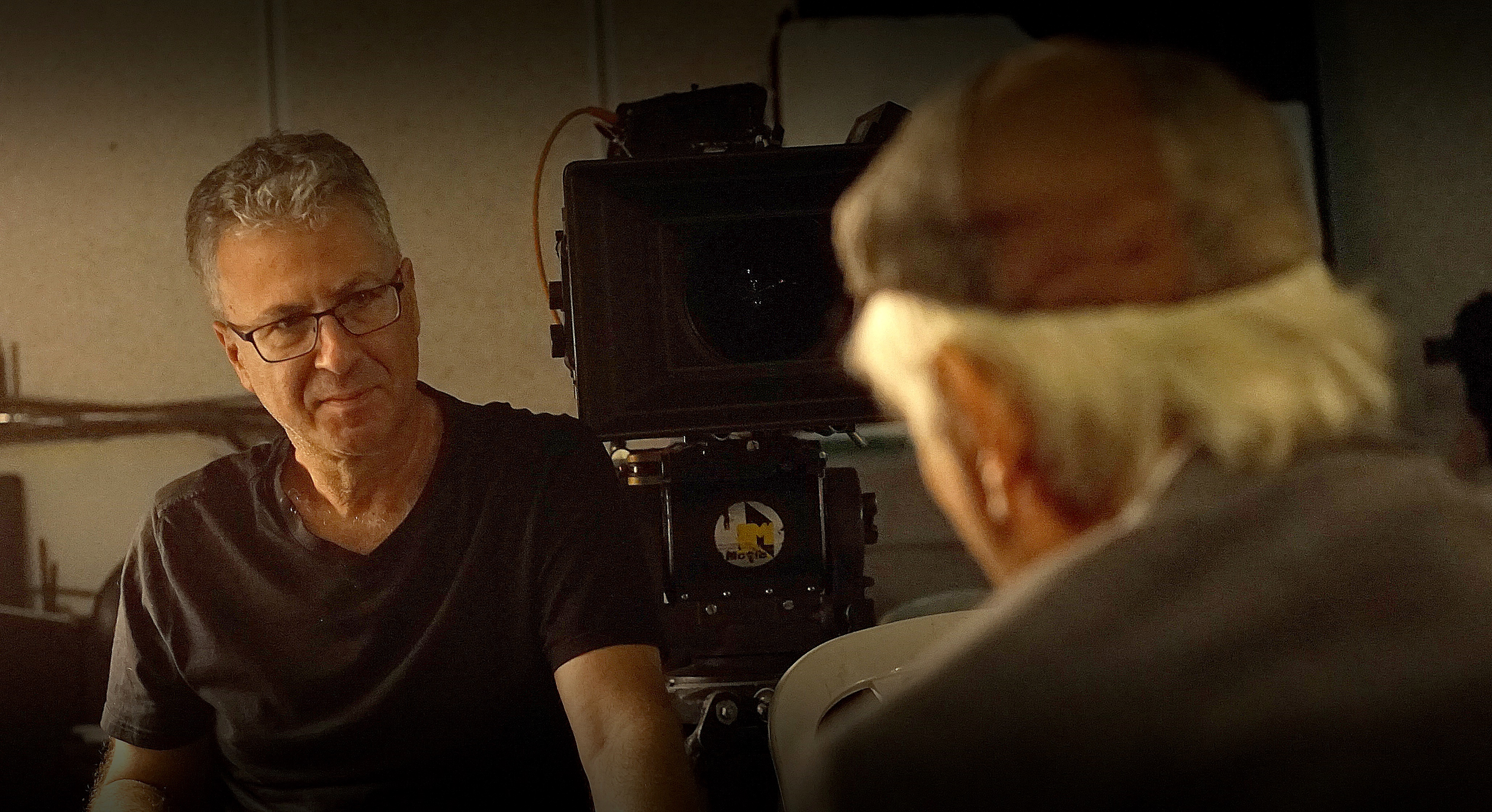
- Born: 1963 (age 62–63); Israel
- Occupations: Documentary filmmaker, producer, director
- Years active: 1996–Present
- Website: www.dukidror.com www.zygotefilm.com

Zadok "Duki” Dror (Hebrew: דוקי (צדוק) דרור; born 1963) is an independent Israeli filmmaker whose films explore issues of migration, identity and displacement.

== Biography ==
Zadok (Duki) Dror was born in Tel Aviv. In the early 1950s, Dror's parents fled from their native Iraq for the newly established state of Israel. When Dror's father was 17 he was arrested on charges of political activism and served five years in prison as a political prisoner. Upon his release, he was not allowed to stay in Iraq. After moving to Israel, the family changed their Arabic name, Darwish (Arabic for "wandering") to Dror (Hebrew for "freedom").

Dror studied film, theater, and classical studies in the United States at UCLA and is a graduate of Columbia College Chicago School of Film and Video.

== Filmmaking career ==
Dror's films are character-driven stories and deal with issues of identity, displacement and cross-cultural exchange.

His film Sentenced to Learn (1993), which tells the story of lifetime inmates in Illinois prisons, was screened in the Pompidou Center in Paris as part of an American Documentary retrospective.

The story behind his parents' immigration to Israel and his father's story in particular is the central motif in Dror's personal film diary My Fantasia (2000) which takes place in the Dror's family-owned Menorah factory between the First and Second Gulf War. The history, culture and identity of Arab Jews has also informed a number of Dror's other work including Cafe Noah (1996), and Shadow in Baghdad (2013) about the disappearance of Baghdad's Jewish population and the story of Linda Menuhin's family.

In 2010, PBS aired a special series of his documentaries.

== Awards and recognition ==
Raging Dove (2002), the story of Arab-Israeli world boxing champion Johar Lashin, which premiered at the SXSW Film Festival and won multiple awards, including Best Israeli Documentary in Docaviv. In 2006, Dror's film about the Vietnamese boat people who immigrated to Israel, The Journey of Vaan Nguyen, was the opening film at EBS Film Festival in Seoul and received the Remi Award at Houston Worldfest. In 2012, Dror's film on German-Jewish architect Erich Mendelsohn Mendelsohn's Incessant Visions received the Golden Award(FILAF d'Or) at the International Art Book and Film Festival (FILAF) in France. Partner with the Enemy (2014) the winner of the Golden Panda Award for long documentary at Sichuan Television Festival. Down The Deep, Dark Web (2016) – premiered in DOK Leipzig, nominated for the Ophir Award for Best Documentary under 60 minutes.

== Filmography ==
=== Director ===
- 1993 Sentenced to Learn
- 1996 Radio Daze
- 1997 Warp & Weft
- 1997 Cafe Noah
- 1998 Shenkin – A Street of Faith
- 1998 Stress
- 1999 Taqasim
- 1999 Red Vibes
- 2000 Watchman
- 2001 My Fantasia
- 2002 Raging Dove
- 2004 Mr. Cortisone Happy Days
- 2005 The Journey of Van Nguyen
- 2007 SideWalk
- 2009 Across the River
- 2011 Mendelsohn's Incessant Visions
- 2013 Shadow in Baghdad
- 2014 Partner with the Enemy
- 2016 Down the Deep, Dark Web
- 2017 Inside The Mossad (TV series)
- 2018 Imperfect Spies (Inside The Mossad, feature film version)
- 2019 There Are No Lions In Tel Aviv
- 2020 Lebanon: Borders of Blood
- 2022 The Cassandra Prophecy
- 2023 Generation Turmoil (directed with Naftaly Gliksberg)

=== Producer ===
- 2003 Paradise Lost
- 2004 Collaborators
- 2005 A General's Story
- 2012 Seekers
- 2013 Photonovela
- 2016 Praise the Lard
