= Vaan Nguyen =

Israeli writer, poet, actor, filmmaker and social activist

- ואן נויין
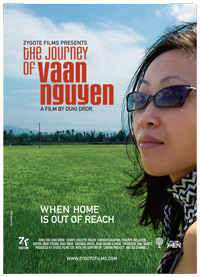
- Born: Nguyễn Thị Hồng Vân; April 18, 1982 (age 44); Ashkelon, Israel
- Occupations: Poet, journalist, PR, filmmaker

Vaan Nguyen (Hebrew: ואן נויין; born Nguyễn Thị Hồng Vân; April 18, 1982) is an Israeli poet, actress, journalist and social activist.

== Early life ==
Nguyen is the daughter of Vietnamese refugees, who were part of a group called the Vietnamese boat people. They escaped Vietnam after the end of the Vietnam War, in 1977, after her grandfather was killed by the communist authorities. The boat was wrecked on the Philippines shore, but they were denied entry, and were interned in a refugee camp.

In 1979, Israeli Prime Minister Menachem Begin granted 180 Vietnamese refugees Israeli citizenship, Nguyen's parents among them. They were settled in the desert town of Sderot, but moved from place to place for several years. Nguyen was born during this time, in the southern city of Ashkelon. The family eventually settled in Jaffa, where Nguyen and her four sisters grew up.

Her childhood was difficult; she faced racist bullying and violence. As a result, she tried to distance herself from her Vietnamese ancestry, going so far as to write to members of parliament to ask to have her "Ethnicity: Vietnamese" erased from her identity card. She would hide in the library, where she read many different authors and genres, citing this early exposure as a major influence on her creativity. Since her first collections was published, Nguyen is considered at the forefront of a new generation of poets, lauded and supported by some of Israel's leading cultural and literary influencers. In her work, she deals extensively with personal issues, such as sexuality, and her marginalization in Israeli society.

== Poetry ==
Nguyen began writing when she was 9, and never stopped creating. Her poems have been published in the mainstream press, including Ha'aretz, Ma'ariv, Walla, and ynet; and in literary journals, including Granta, Iton 77, Ma'ayan, and LaRohav. In the literary scene, Nguyen contributes to "Free Academy" and "Guerrilla Tarbut".

Her poems have been translated into English and French, and several have been set to music.

=== Books ===
Three collections of Nguyen's poems have been published:

- Ein Hacamehin (Truffle Eye), Ma'ayan 2008 (as a pamphlet; reissued as a book with additional content in 2014)
- The Truffle Eye by Vaan Nguyen, Translated from Hebrew by Adriana X. Jacobs, Zephyr Press 2021
- Hituch Hehavalim (Vanity Intersection), Barhash 2018

=== Reception ===
Ha'aretz critic Menahem Ben wrote of her first collection: "How can I describe the magic that has set upon us? This is wondrous poetry. Ever since Yona Wallach in the 1960s and 1970s, we have not seen such a phenomenon." Poet and writer Tali Lativitzky wrote, "It is impossible to miss Vaan Nguyen's brilliant musicality. Her rich Hebrew has an enviable lack of stereotypes and linguistic and cultural fixations, and her ear perceives all the most desirable compositions of sound and musicality, even if semantically they are zany."

== Film and television ==
Van Nguyen appeared in a feature documentary film called The Journey of Vaan Nguyen (Israel 2005) by filmmaker Duki Dror. The film follows Nguyen's trip with her father back to Bong Son in central Vietnam in order to try and reclaim the family's land and property. The movie also features commentary from Nguyen's blog, which became renowned in the Israeli blogosphere.

=== Filmography ===
Film

Year	Title	Role	Notes
2005	The Journey of Vaan Nguyen	Herself	Screened in multiple international film festivals
2006	--	Lead	Student film by Lior Alsheikh
2013	Kidon		
2013	Joanna Learns to Swim		Short film
2017	Death of a Poetess	Katy	Directed by Efrat Mishori and Dana Goldberg

Television

In addition to her roles as an actor, Nguyen has appeared in several television commercials. In 2003–2004 Nguyen hosted several lifestyle episodes of lifestyle television series on "Teva Ha-Dvarim" TV channel, and in 2005 was a hosted some editorial episodes on blogTV.co.il.

Year	Title	Role	Notes
2006	Karov Levadai	Guest role	
2007	Lo Hivtachti Lach	Guest role	
2009	Hasufim	Lihi	
2016	Bnot Hazahav	Teriyaki	

== Additional activities ==
Nguyen worked as a model for L'Oréal in a campaign for hair color, and was the house model for the Lichtenstein hair salon. She participated in fashion layouts in the "Maariv" teen magazine, and "Yedioth Aharonoth". She also appeared in fashion designer Petite A's 2011 catalog.

In 2002–2003, she wrote a weekly column for Zman Tel Aviv newspaper, and then became a writer for Maariv.

Nguyen is a social activist, and a graduate of the Free Israel leadership program. She volunteered as a fundraiser for Amnesty International.
