= Incessant Visions =

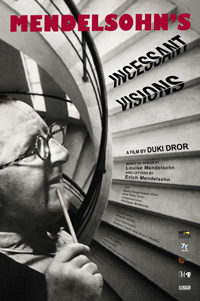
- Film poster
- Directed by: Duki Dror
- Release date: July 2011 (Jerusalem)
- Running time: 71 minutes
- Country: Israel
- Language: English

Mendelsohn's Incessant Visions, also known simply as Incessant Visions, is a 2011 documentary film directed by Duki Dror. The film takes as its focus the German-Jewish architect Erich Mendelsohn, exposing the complexities and intricacies of Mendelsohn's life and work through a series of letters with Louise, the young cellist who would eventually become his wife. Dror's film is at once an examination of Mendelsohn's seminal architectural work as well as an exploration of the German-Jewish experience during and after World War II seen through Mendelsohn's journey from Germany to England, British Mandate Palestine and the US.

The film premiered at the 2011 Jerusalem Film Festival.

== Synopsis ==
The film follows the trajectory of Mendelsohn's career, bringing to life the stories (and, in interviews with other architects and experts, the impact) of his many influential buildings such as the Einstein Tower observatory in Potsdam and the Universum (the modern day Schaubühne building), believed to be the first modern cinema in the world. Though Mendelsohn enjoyed the status of one of Germany's most important and successful architects, the outbreak of World War II led him to flee Germany. Utilizing over 1,200 personal letters penned between Mendelsohn and the 16-year-old cellist Louise who would later become his wife, the film brings to life both the historical context in which Mendelsohn lived and worked as well as the architect's personal struggles and eccentricities. The letters between Mendelsohn and Louise also serve to bring to life other famous characters of Mendelsohn's era, including the German poet and playwright Ernst Toller whose affair with Louise provides the film with additional drama.
