= Ars poetica (Israel) =

Israeli poetry group

Ars poetica (Hebrew: ערס פואטיקה) is a contemporary Israeli poetry group.

The name is at once a riff on Horace's Art of Poetry, and on the term ars, which means pimp in Arabic, and in Israeli Hebrew slang "low-life," a derogatory term for Mizrachi men with connotations of vulgar mannerisms.

The group was started in about 2013 by Israeli poet Adi Keissar. Roy Hasan and Erez Biton are among the more notable members.
