= Sami Shalom Chetrit =

Moroccan-Palestinian author and academic (born 1960)

- סמי שלום שטרית
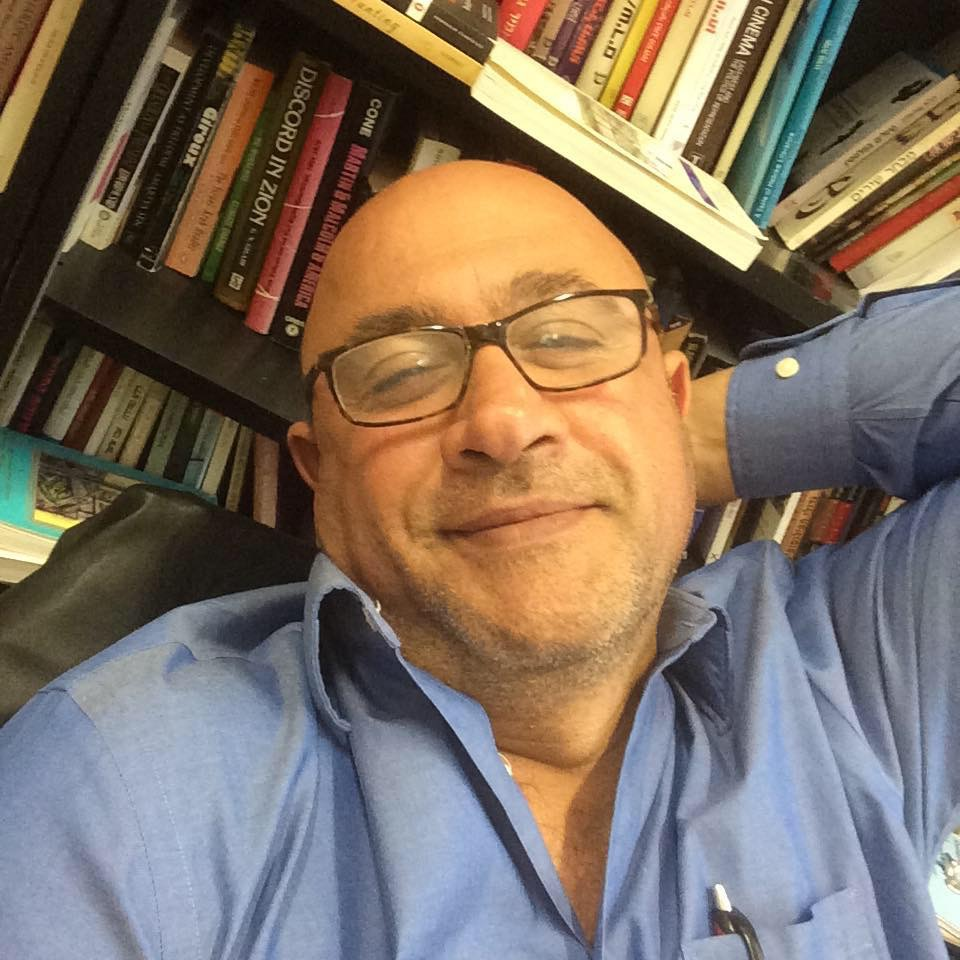
- Prof. Sami Shalom Chetrit, 2015
- Born: 1960 (age 65–66); Errachidia, Morocco
- Education: BA in literature, Hebrew University of Jerusalem; MA in political science, Hebrew University of Jerusalem; PhD in political science, Hebrew University of Jerusalem; MA in international affairs, Columbia University
- Occupations: Poet, scholar, activist
- Known for: Mizrahi activism, literature, social and peace activism

Academic work
- Discipline: Hebrew language, literature, culture, Middle Eastern studies
- Institutions: Queens College

Sami Shalom Chetrit (Hebrew: סמי שלום שטרית; born 1960) is a Moroccan-born Hebrew poet an inter-disciplinary scholar and teacher, and Israeli social and peace activist.

== Biography ==
Sami Shalom Chetrit was born in Errachidia, Morocco. His family moved to Israel when he was 3 years old. He grew up in Ashdod. He received his BA (literature), MA (political science) and PhD (political science) from the Hebrew University of Jerusalem, and his MA in international affairs from Columbia University in New York.

Chetrit lives in New York City. He teaches Hebrew language, literature and culture, and Middle Eastern studies at Queens College in Flushing, New York.

Chetrit was a Mizrahi activist and one of the founders of Kedma, an alternative school system that advocated equal opportunities for all students and a multi-cultural curriculum. He was among the founders of HaKeshet HaDemokratit HaMizrakhit (Mizrahi Democratic Rainbow Coalition) for social justice and cultural freedom.

Chetrit is the author of numerous articles and books on culture, society and politics in Israel, a novel and four books of poetry. He produced two documentary films. Chetrit is the founder of the democratic Mizrahi blog for social justice and peace in Israel-Palestine.

Chetrit identifies as an Arab Jew.

== Published works ==
- Intra-Jewish Conflict in Israel: White Jews, Black Jews. London and New York: Routledge. 2010. 298 pp.
- “Revisiting Bialik: A Radical Mizrahi Reading of the Jewish National Poet.” Comparative Literature. Winter 2010.
- “Mirror Mirror on the Wall, in this Land, am I the Greatest Victim of them All? - Comments Following a Journey along Route 181.” (a documentary film by E. Sivan and M. Khleifi). In: Yael Munk and Eyal Sivan (editors) South Cinema Notebooks, # 2: On Destruction, Trauma & Cinema. Fall 2007. Israel: Sapir College Press & Pardes Publishing House.
- “Why are SHAS and the Mizrahim supporters of the right ?“ in : T. Honig-Parnas and T. Haddad (editors), Between the Lines – Readings on Israel, The Palestinians, and the U.S. ‘War on Terror’ Chicago : Haymarket Books, 2007. pp. 195–203.
- “The Ashkenazi-Zionist Problem : The Segregation in Education as a case study“ in: Y. Yona, Y. Naaman and D. Mahleb (editors), A rainbow of Opinions – A Mizrahi Agenda for Israel. Tel Aviv: November Books, 2007. pp. 221–234. (Hebrew)
- “The Neo-Mizrahim: The Mizrahi Radical Discourse and the Democratic Rainbow Coalition movement“, in: G. Abutbul, L. Grinberg and P. Muzafi-Haler (editors). Mizrahi Voices: Toward a New Discourse on Israeli Society and Culture. Tel Aviv: Masada. 2005. pp. 131–152. (Hebrew)
- Hamaávak HaMizrahi Be’Yisrael: Bein Dikui keshihrur, bein hizdahut lealternativa, 1948–2003. (The Mizrahi Struggle in Israel: Between Oppression and Liberation, Identification and Alternative, 1948–2003), Am-Oved / Ofakim Series, 2004 (Hebrew).
- النضال الشرقي في إسرائيل – بين القمع والتحرر، بين التماثل والبديل 1948-2003 (The Mizrahi Struggle in Israel: Between Oppression and Liberation, Identification and Alternative, 1948–2003). MADAR RamAllah, Palestine, 2005. (Arabic).
- SHAS and the “new Mizrahim” – Back to Back in Parallel Axles: Criticism of and Alternative to - European Zionism. Israel Studies Forum. Spring 2002. Volume 17, Number 2. pp. 107–113.
- Shas: Catch 17 – between ultra-orthodoxy and Mizrahiut. In: Shas – the challenge of Israeliness. (Hebrew) Editor: Yoav Peled. TAPUACH, Yediot Aharonot, 2001. Chapter 1, pp. 21–51.
- Mizrahi Politics In Israel: Between Integration And Alternative. Journal of Palestine Studies. University of California Press, Berkeley. Volume XXXIX/4 – Number 116. Summer 2000. pp. 51–65.
- The Tents Movement (Hebrew). In: Fifty to Forty-Eight, a special issue of Theory and Criticism Vol. 12-13 1999. Editor: Adi Ofir. Van Leer Jerusalem Institute.

=== Literary publications ===
- “To Sing in Ashdodi”, an interview with Ronit Hacham. In: Hebrew Writers on Writing, Edited by Peter Cole. Trinity University Press, 2008
- “A Mural With no Wall. Kasida to Mahmud Darwish.” A poem. Al-Adaab Literary Journal, Beirut, Lebanon. 2008. (Arabic)
- Yehudim (Jews). Poetry book. Nahar books. Binyamina, Israel. 2008. (Hebrew)
- Ein Habuba (Doll’s Eye), a novel. Hargol-Am Oved publishers, Tel Aviv, Israel. 2007. (Hebrew)
- Shirim Beashdodit (Poems in Ashdodian), poetry collection 1982-2002. Andalus Publishers, Tel Aviv Israel. 2003. (Hebrew)
- Exclusive poetry contribution to: Frederic Brenner, Diaspora: Homeland in Exile. Volume 1: Photographs, volume 2: Voices. Harper Collins Publishers. New York. 2003. List of my poems (volume2, voices): “where would we be today, Dr. Horowitz?” (page 23), “Oh black desert daughters” (page 30), “Look, a Bukharan Barber shop” (page 42), “The Little Yemenites” (Pages 54–55), “in God we trust” (page 80).
- (Editor) Me’aa Shanim, Me’aa Yotzrim. Asufat Yetzirot Ivriyot BaMizrah BaMe’aa HaEsrim. (A Century of Hebrew Writing. An Anthology of Modern Hebrew writing in the Middle East) Volumes A and B: prose, 1998. Volume C: Poetry, 1999. Bimat Kedem Publishing, Tel Aviv, Israel. (Hebrew).
- Freha Shem Yafe (Freha is a beautiful name), poems (Hebrew). Nur publishing, Tel Aviv, 1995.
- Ptiha (Opening). Poems. Eked publishing. Tel Aviv, 1988.
- English translations of his poems from both books appeared in: Keys to the Garden. New Israeli Writing. Editor: Ammiel Alcalay. 1996. City Lights Books, San Francisco. pp. 357–369.
- Many of his poems were published throughout the years (in Hebrew and other languages) in numerous literary magazines, journals, periodicals, newspapers and anthologies.

=== Documentary films ===
The Black Panthers (in Israel) Speak – a documentary film about the Israeli social-protest movement “The Black Panthers”, in the early 1970s. research and script writing. co-production and co-directed with Eli Hamo. (53 min, Hebrew with English subtitles). 2003. Special Screening at the Tel Aviv Cinemateque, 2003. Special Screening at the Jerusalem Cinemateque, 2003. Official Selection The African Diaspora Film Festival, New York, 2004. Official Selection ArteEast Film Festival, New York, 2004. Official Selection for a Greek Alternative Film Festival, 2005. Official Selection for an Irish Alternative Film Festival, 2005.

Az’i Ayima (come mother) – a documentary film about Moroccan women of the first generation in Israel. Writing and directing. Produced by Haim Buzaglo. (77 minutes, Hebrew and Moroccan with English subtitles) 2009. DocAviv International Film Festival, Tel Aviv 2009. Official selection, special screening. Darom International Film Festival, Sderot 2009. Official selection.
