= Tehila =

Tehila may refer to:

- Tehila (given name), a Hebrew feminine given name
- Tehila (organization), an Israeli organization for parents of LGBT individuals
