= Maayan Strauss =

Israeli artist (b. 1982)

Maayan Strauss (Hebrew: מעין שטראוס; born in 1982 in Jerusalem) is an Israeli artist.

Strauss studied architecture at the Bezalel Academy of Arts and Design in Jerusalem. She has exhibited in several galleries and art projects that have addressed themes as diverse as climate change, and the politics of Israeli settlements.

The Art & Poetry magazine Maayan was named after her, and she was one of the contributors to articles as a co-founder & editor. She also launched the world's first container ship residency.
