= Roy Hasan =

Israeli contemporary Hebrew poet (born 1983)

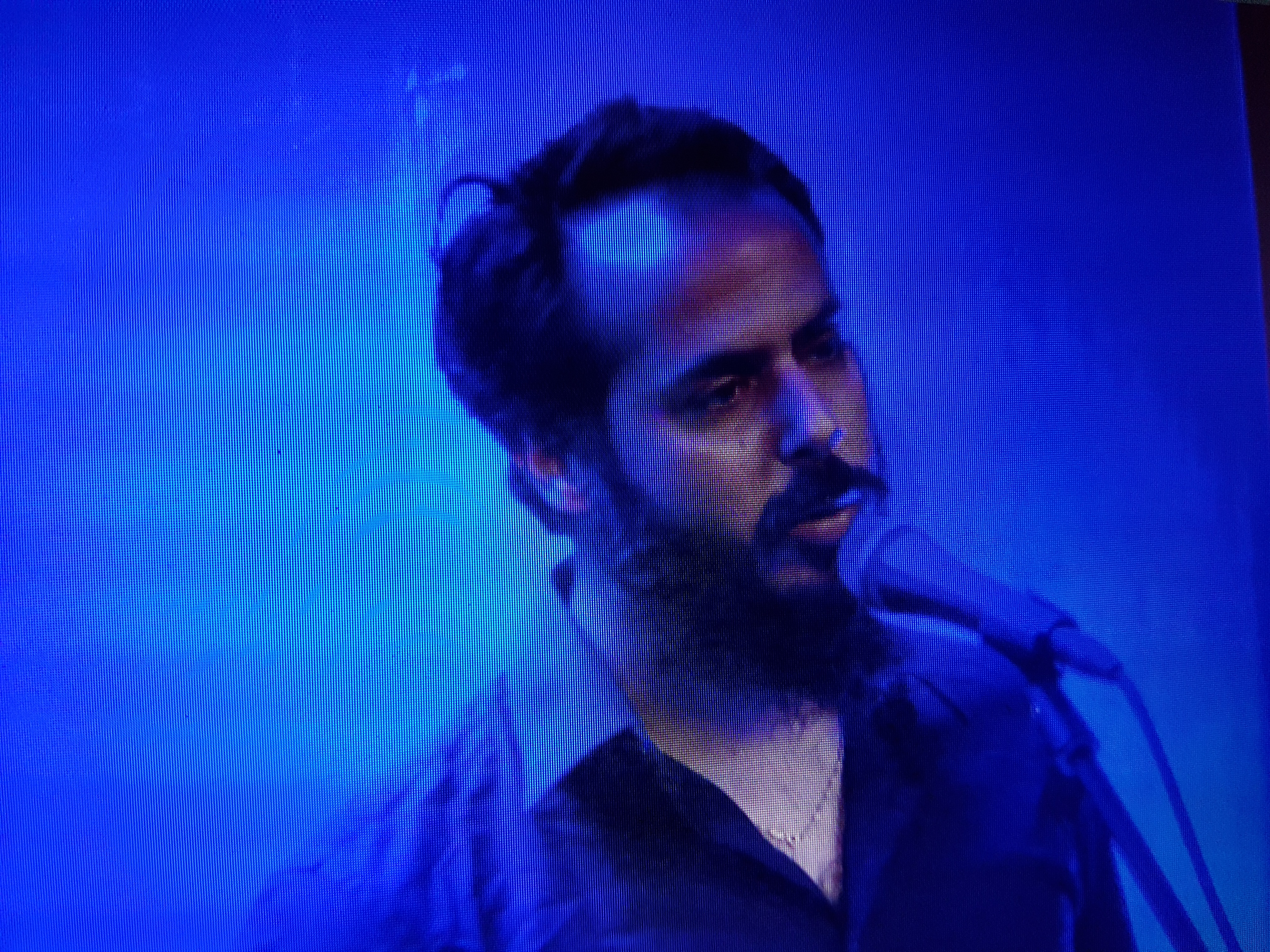
- Native name: רועי חסן
- Born: 9 April 1983 (age 43) Hadera, Israel
- Occupation: Poet, writer
- Genre: Poetry

Roy Hasan (Hebrew: רועי חסן; born 9 April 1983, in Hadera, Israel) is an Israeli contemporary Hebrew poet. He is a principal member of the Ars poetica literary movement. In 2015 Hasan was awarded the 2015 Bernstein Prize.

Hasan grew up in a Mizrahi family in a lower-class neighborhood in a lower-class town, and worked as a cook during his mandatory military service. He continue to work as a low-paid cook after returning to civilian life. His poetry is regarded as part of a Mizrachi rebellion against the Ashkenazi and elitist Israeli left-wing political and literary establishment.

== Selected works ==
- The dogs that barked in our childhood were muzzled, Haklavim shenavhu beyaldutenu hayu hasumei pe (Hebrew: הכלבים שנבחו בילדותנו היו חסומי פה) (Poetry), Tangier (טנג'יר), 2014)
- No Other Memory (Hebrew: אין זיכרון אחר) (Prose), Home Mansion (Publishing), 2018
- Gold Lions (Hebrew: זהב אריות) (Songs), Tangier Publishing, 2017
