= Amira Hess =

Israeli poet and artist (1943–2023)

- אמירה הס
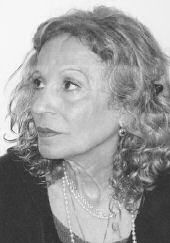
- Hess in 2013
- Born: 13 March 1943; Baghdad, Kingdom of Iraq
- Died: 1 December 2023 (aged 80); Jerusalem, Israel
- Occupations: Poet, painter, actress
- Writing career
- Language: Hebrew

Amira Hess (Hebrew: אמירה הס; 13 March 1943 – 1 December 2023) was an Israeli poet and artist. Arriving in Israel in 1951 to a refugee transit camp, she then made her home in Jerusalem, where she lived for the rest of her life. Her first book, And the Moon is Dripping Madness, was awarded the Luria Prize (named for the poet Yerucham Luria). Her other volumes of poetry in Hebrew include Two Horses by the Light Line, The Information Eater, Yovel, and There is no Real Woman in Israel. Some individual poems have been translated into English, French, German, Greek, Spanish and Russian. A collection of about seventy poems under the title Between Boulders of Basalt and Foundation, was translated into English by Shay K. Azoulay. Hess published 13 volumes of poetry in all. She was twice awarded the Prime Minister's prize for poetry, The Yehuda Amichai Prize, as well as the Kugel & AHI Award for poetry.

Amira Hess died from cancer on 1 December 2023, at the age of 80.
