= Eibhlís Carcione =

Bilingual writer and poet

- Website: eibhliscarcione.com

Eibhlís Carcione is a bilingual children's writer and poet, writing in Irish and English. She lives in Cork.

== Career ==
She has published poems in Feasta, An Gael, The Moth, and THE SHOP. She won the Foras na Gaeilge literary prize in 2012, another prize at the Ballinasloe literary festival (Roscommon), the Raifterí Festival Poetry Competition and the Cultúrlann McAdam Ó Fiaich Poetry Competition, Belfast.

Since 2023, she has written three children's books.

== Publications ==
=== Poetry collections ===
- Tonn Clíodhna. Coiscéim. 2015.
- Eala Oíche. Coiscéim. 2019.
- Bean Róin. Coiscéim. 2023.

=== Children's books ===
- Welcome to Dead Town Raven McKay. Everything with Words. 2023. ISBN 978-1911427339.
- Black Gables. Everything with Words. 2024. ISBN 978-1911427438.
- Carcione, Eibhlís; Castro, Beatriz (Illus.) (2025). Midnight House. Collins Big Cat Read On. HarperCollins Publishers Limited. ISBN 978-0-00-874486-1.
