= Ari Libsker =

Israeli filmmaker and journalist

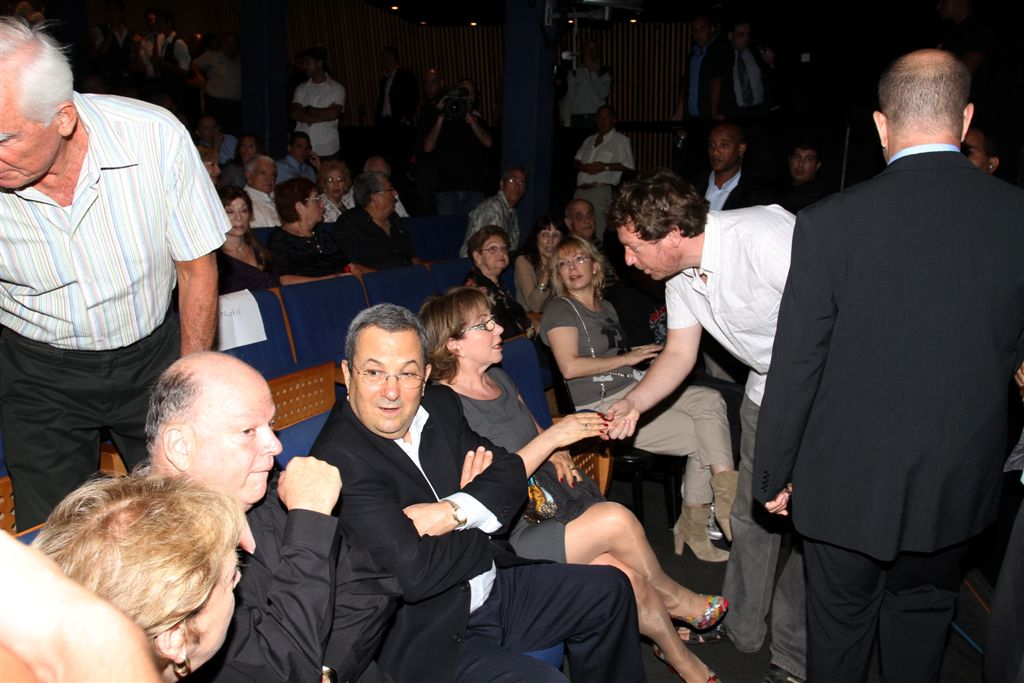
Ari Libsker with Israel defense minister Ehud Barak, 2010

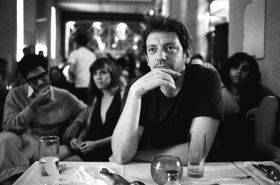
Ari Libsker in "Pronto" Tel Aviv 2008

Ari Libsker (Hebrew: ארי ליבסקר; born 1972 in Haifa), is an Israeli filmmaker and journalist. He has made several documentaries. His film Stalags (2008) featured in The New York Times and won several awards. In March 2012 he curated the exhibition "Iran", which protests what he views as "panic over the Iranian atomic bomb."

== Film making ==
One of his first films, Circumcision (Israel 2004, 30 min, channel 2) dealt with the harmful effects of circumcision. Channel 2 tried to censor the movie and in the end broadcast it at a late hour. The movie got a lot of response and criticism.

Libsker is a film tutor and a business journalist for Firma magazine (Globes), the Israeli financial paper.

In the late 1990s, he founded, with others the "Free Academy" group. In 2002 he starred as an actor in the short Baboon group film depicting the life of a Tel Avivan Van Gogh. Since 2004 he co-edits Maayan Magazine, a magazine of poetry and ideas, and the film magazine Maarvon. One of their exhibitions was named "I Slept with Ari Libsker" and was held on a roof in Tel Aviv, another one was named "Sharon" on the connection between the wealthy Sharon plain area in Israel and the former PM Ariel Sharon.

In May 2006 Libsker presented the video work Magic 2 at the exhibition Doron, which refers to Doron Sabag, exhibited in the Minshar gallery of Tel Aviv. It dealt with art and workers rights.

In 2007 Libsker worked on the feature documentary film Stalags. During the early 1960s in Israel and the Adolf Eichmann trial "Stalags" were pornographic booklet describing masochistic brutal sex relationship between Nazi women wardens and concentration camp prisoners. The film analyzes the reasons behind the phenomenon.

On September 6, 2007, Libsker was interviewed by The New York Times on pre-release of his film. He said in part, "I realized that the first Holocaust pictures I saw, as one who grew up here, were of naked women. We were in elementary school. I remember how embarrassed we were."

A year later Libsker completed The Home Poem (Israel 2006, 60 min.) a movie that followed three people, one of them his grandmother and their relation to home. (The name "Home Poem" is in respect to the same-titled book by poet Aharon Shabtai).

On 2010 he pretended to be a rich Croatian real estate genius to infiltrate the apartment of defense minister Ehud Barak and try to purchase it from his wife Nili, for a Calcalist Hebrew magazine article.
