= Guerrilla Tarbut =

Activist group of Israeli poets

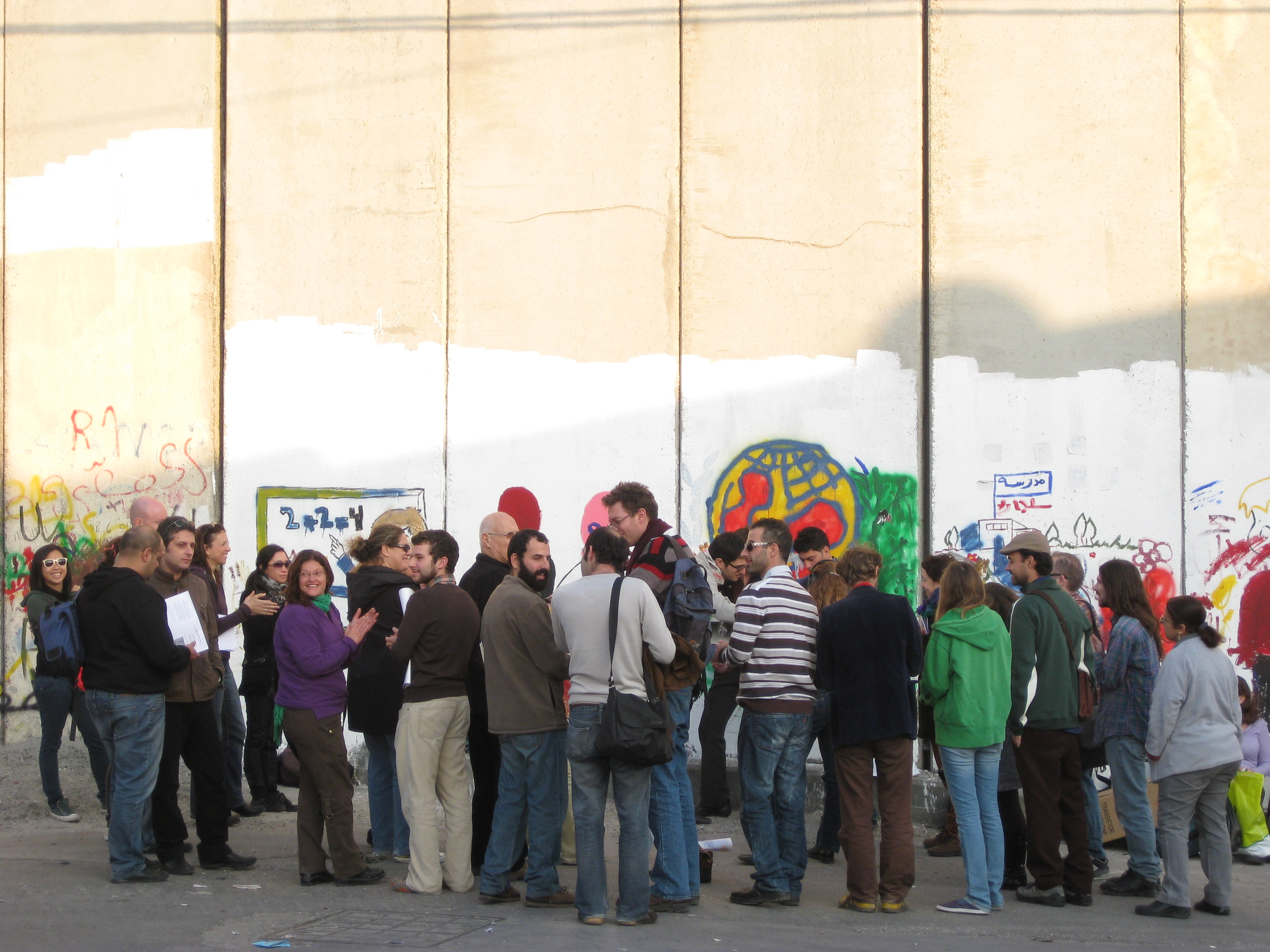
A Guerrilla Tarbut poetry event in East Jerusalem, 2009

Guerrilla Tarbut (Hebrew: גרילה תרבות, lit. 'Cultural Guerrilla') is an activist group of Israeli poets. Founded in 2007, the group aims to promote social and political causes through poetry, both in Hebrew and in Arabic, performed by its members during demonstrations against social injustice.

== Activities ==
Guerrilla Tarbut's activities take a form which is somewhere between a demonstration, and a poetry reading using a megaphone.

The poets involved with Guerrilla Tarbut's activities read of their works during demonstrations. Sometimes singer-songwriters will attend also, and perform live during the activities in various musical styles. Although independent by nature, many of the group's activities are sponsored by Israeli poetry magazines, and coordinated with Israeli non-governmental organizations, including B'Tselem, New Israel Fund, and the Mizrahi Democratic Rainbow Coalition. Participants include poets and musicians of various ages and artistic styles, Jews and Arabs alike.

== Publications ==
Guerrilla Tarbut's poets have also published three collections of their poems. The first collection, named Aduma (Hebrew: אדומה, lit. 'Red'), was published 1 May 2007 and concerned with workers' rights. The second collection, Latzet! (Hebrew: לצאת, lit. 'Out Now!'), was published in January 2009 as a response to the Gaza War. The third, Poetry Dismantles A Wall (Hebrew: שירה מפרקת חומה), was published on 25 March and was a bilingual collection of Arabic and Hebrew poetry against the Israeli West Bank barrier.

== Participants ==
Poets who have taken part in Guerrilla Tarbut's events include: Eran Tzelgov, Aharon Shabtai, Yudit Shahar, Roy "Chicky" Arad, Mati Shemoelof, Ronny Someck, Yuval Ben-Ami, Joshua Simon, Maya Bejerano, Almog Behar, Vaan Nguyen, Bo'az Yaniv, Ronnie Hirsch and others.

== Past events ==
- The Waitress' Poetry (December 2007) Solidarity with the waitresses of a coffee-shop in Tel Aviv University, protesting against the management's policy to appropriate their tips to itself.
- Polgat Poetry (April 2008) Solidarity with workers of a closed textile factory in the city of Kiryat Gat.
- The Poetry of Science (December 2008) Solidarity with temporary workers of the "Science Garden" in the Weizmann Institute of Science, in Rehovot.
- Akirov Poetry (January 2009) An event in front of Akirov Towers in Tel Aviv, exclusive residence of Israeli Defense Minister Ehud Barak, during operation Cast Lead.
- The Poetry of the Closed University (May 2009) Solidarity with workers of the Open University of Israel, who had gone on a strike, in front of the university president's home in Kfar Saba. Despite police efforts to ban it, the event took place as planned.
- The Poem of the Refugees' Daughters (August 2009) A protest against the Israeli government's intention to deport children of labour immigrants and refugees, near an Immigration Police facility in an industrial area near the city of Holon.
- Poets Against Big Brother (November 2009) A protest against a proposition to establish a biometric database of all Israeli citizens, in front of Israeli government offices in Tel Aviv.
- Poetry Not Walls (December 2009) Poetry reading near the Israeli West Bank barrier in Abu Dis, Eastern Jerusalem, in cooperation with B'Tselem.
- The Poetry of Yeruham (January 2010) Solidarity with workers of the Akerstein tile factory in the city of Yeruham, in their struggle to improve working conditions and gain management recognition for their own self-elected worker's union.
- The Poetry of Ramla-Lod (May 2010) Solidarity with the people of the unrecognized Arab village Dahmash, in the outskirts of Ramla, campaigning for government recognition and basic facilities.
- Pirates' Poetry (May 2010) A protest against the IDF raid on the Gaza flotilla, in front of the Israeli Defense Ministry.
- The Poetry of Sheikh Jarrah (June 2010) Solidarity with Arab residents of Sheikh Jarrah neighborhood in Jerusalem, in their struggle against eviction and dispossession.
- Poetry of the Minimum (July 2010) A protest against the Israeli government's indifference to the economic inequality in Israeli society, evident in the Knesset's decision to refrain from raising minimum wage, while voting for a raise in the salary of the ministers and PM's themselves. In front of the Bank of Israel's building in Tel Aviv.
- Poetry of the Bedouins (August 2010) in the unrecognised Bedouin village of Al-Araqeeb, protesting its repeated demolition by Israeli authorities and calling for a fair resolution to the land dispute surrounding it, as well as other unrecognised villages.

== Ideology ==
The group doesn't subscribe to a particular political manifesto, nor is it associated with any political party or movement. Similarly, the participating poets employ various poetical styles.

== Critical commentary and response ==
The group's activities draw significant attention in the Israeli mainstream media, and in literary circles. Yitzhak Laor, prominent leftist poet and publicist, argued that poetry cannot bring about change, and "teaching literature in the periphery is more important than reading poetry in front of a factory". Elsewhere, Mr. Laor hinted that Guerilla Tarbut's activity "has emptied the term Guerrilla of all meaning". Some poets object to the mixture of poetry and political activism, claiming that this mixture is "narcissistic", and self-serving for the poets themselves.

The group members, on the other hand, point out that less than a week after the poetic demonstration in the Akerstein factory in Yeruham, the hard-liner local executive was fired and some of the workers' demands were accepted. Similarly, following the demonstration in the coffee-shop in Tel Aviv, the waitresses' demands were fully granted. Each and every event gained valuable publicity for the corresponding campaign. Moreover, as one of the striking Akerstein's employees put it: "[Guerrilla Tarbut's visit] is empowering us in our struggle, it raises our spirits."
