= Zoya Cherkassky-Nnadi =

Ukrainian-born Israeli artist

Zoya Cherkassky-Nnadi זויה צ'רקסקי-ננדי
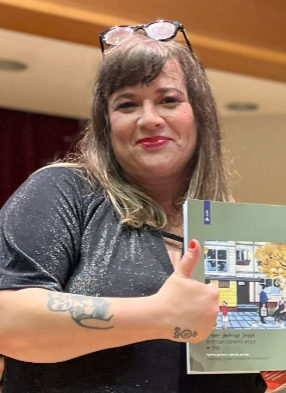
- Born: Zoya Cherkassky (Зоя Черкасський); 1976 (age 49–50); Kyiv, Soviet Union
- Movement: Barbizon
- Children: 1

Zoya Cherkassky-Nnadi (née Cherkassky) is a Ukrainian-Israeli artist, born in Kyiv in 1976, who emigrated to Israel in 1991. Her works focus on her personal experiences, including childhood in the Soviet Union and immigrant life in Israel. Cherkassky-Nnadi also helped found the New Barbizon Group with four other painters, all born in the former USSR.

== Soviet childhood ==
In 2015, Cherkassky-Nnadi created a collection of art pieces depicting everyday scenes she observed throughout her childhood in the Soviet Ukraine. The works display particularities of her own childhood, such as her nightly routine of watching out the window for her mother to return home from work, as well as more general norms of Soviet life at that time, such as the cramped apartments that many people lived in, and the food that was commonly enjoyed during May Day festivities. "It’s childhood so even if it’s something unpleasant you remember it with some sort of nostalgia," she said, in her first ever English-language interview.

As the granddaughter of a food store manager, Cherkassky-Nnadi had access to a wider variety of foods than many of her childhood peers. This can be seen in some of her works revolving around food, such as "May Day" and "Tomatoes." Cherkassky-Nnadi worked on this collection while she was pregnant with her first child, and the artist feels this contributed to the warmth of the pieces.

== Pravda: Immigrating to Israel ==
Cherkassky-Nnadi and her family immigrated to Israel in 1991, just two weeks before the collapse of the USSR. In 2010, Cherkassky-Nnadi began working on an exhibit entitled Pravda (truth), which was published in 2018, depicting the experience. Similar to the Soviet Childhood exhibit, Pravda includes scenes from Cherkassky-Nnadi's own experience with immigrating, as well as scenarios that she portrays as a common experience for those migrating from the former Soviet Union to Israel at that time. Some of these scenes include the arrival of the new immigrants, like in her painting titled "New Victims," as well as the struggles these new immigrants faced when trying to fully integrate into the Jewish lifestyle, as can be seen in "The Rabbi's Deliquium" and "The Circumcision of Uncle Yasha." Some of the works in the exhibit also portray the discrimination some immigrants experienced. Cherkassky-Nnadi specifically addresses some of the stereotypes placed on Russian women in Israel, such as her work entitled "Aliyah of the 1990s" which depicts the stereotype of the "Russian whore," or in her painting "Iztik," which not only shows the stereotypical Russian woman - fragile, blonde, fair-skinned - but also portrays a very stereotypical Mizrahi man, including the dark skin, large nose, and thick lips. The painting was the subject of much criticism due to its portrayal of both groups of people, but the painting is intended to portray the habit of stereotyping that occurred in Israel at the time.

== The New Barbizon Group ==
In 2010, Cherkassky-Nnadi founded the group alongside four Soviet-born artists also living in Israel: Olga Kundina, Anna Lukashevsky, Asya Lukin, and Natalia Zourabova. The name refers to the Barbizon School of Painters that were active in France in the 19th century and encouraged realism both in painting and in perspective. A section of The New Barbizon Group's work incorporates African art, which allows them to stray away from typical Western standards, while also allowing them to immerse themselves in the prominent African culture that exists in different areas of Tel Aviv. African culture is so prominent in some parts of Israel due to the thousands of African asylum seekers that have entered Israel starting in 2006. Due to the artists' own experience with immigration and the feeling of not belonging, they can identify with the African immigrants who are going through the same things the artists themselves went through. The group's works focusing on these African immigrants show the different burdens they carry, whether that be racially motivated violence, or the anxiety that comes when one feels that they do not belong, as these are all experiences that the artists also faced after their own immigration.

== October 7 works ==
Following the 2023 Hamas-led attack on Israel on October 7, 2023, Cherkassky-Nnadi has received attention for her work relating to the events of October 7. These mixed-media works, mostly using pencils, watercolor, and wax crayons, depict scenes from the attacks on civilians in Israel's south. They have been exhibited at the Jewish Museum in New York City and at the Jewish Museum Vienna.

Cherkassky-Nnadi’s works depicting the events of October 7 have been subject to protest in the United States. On February 12, 2024, protestors disrupted a talk Cherkassky-Nnadi was giving at New York’s Jewish Museum, calling her work “imperial propaganda” and characterizing the museum’s exhibition of her work as “manufactur[ing] consent for genocide.” Commenting on this event, Cherkassky-Nnadi said, “It's hard to defend the current Israeli government to them because I think the government bears major blame for what happened. On the other hand – on October 7, babies were kidnapped and killed. Can't they feel compassion for these people? […] in this massive negative reaction from the art world, I see white people coming from privileged countries who think they know how to solve the [Israeli-Palestinian] conflict.”

== Reception ==
Due to the controversial topics that Cherkassky-Nnadi addresses in her art, viewers have many different opinions. While some viewers criticize the politics behind Cherkassky-Nnadi's art, others criticize the art itself, feeling that the extent to which she comments on society takes away from the actual art. Cherkassky-Nnadi has also received mixed responses to her portrayal of the Soviet Union; some critics fault her for depicting too much poverty and negativity, while others suggest she underplayed the poor living standards during that time. Cherkassky-Nnadi appreciates the responses to her work, and is glad they have sparked discussion on such important topics. Other critics point out the continuity of Cherkassky-Nnadi's visual language with late-Soviet artistic practices and the need to place her works within broader conceptual frameworks.

== Inspiration ==
While much of Cherkassky-Nnadi's work is based directly on her own experiences, some of her work is also inspired by other media. A section of her work in Pravda was inspired by the Russian film Little Vera.

== Personal life ==
Cherkassky-Nnadi is married to a Nigerian immigrant Obinna Nnadi. Her husband is from Ngwo, Nigeria. The couple have one child, a daughter named Vera.
