= Kedma School =

Kedma School בית הספר קדמה

Location
- Katamon, Jerusalem
- Coordinates: 31°45′13″N 35°11′54″E

Information
- Age: 12 to 18
- Enrollment: 160 (2011)
- Website: www.kedma-school.org.il

The Kedma School (Hebrew: בית הספר קדמה) is a high school in Katamonim, Jerusalem.

== History ==
As of 2011, the school had 160 students in grades 7–12. Kedma opened in 1994. As of 2011 the class ratio is one to 13.

As of 2011, most students are Jews from North Africa, including Moroccan; Sephardi; Ethiopian; and Kurdish origins. Most of the students had previously substandard test scores and/or issues with discipline and therefore had left their mainstream schools.

== See also ==
- Education in Israel
