= Doron Sabag =

Israeli art patron and businessman

- דורון סבג
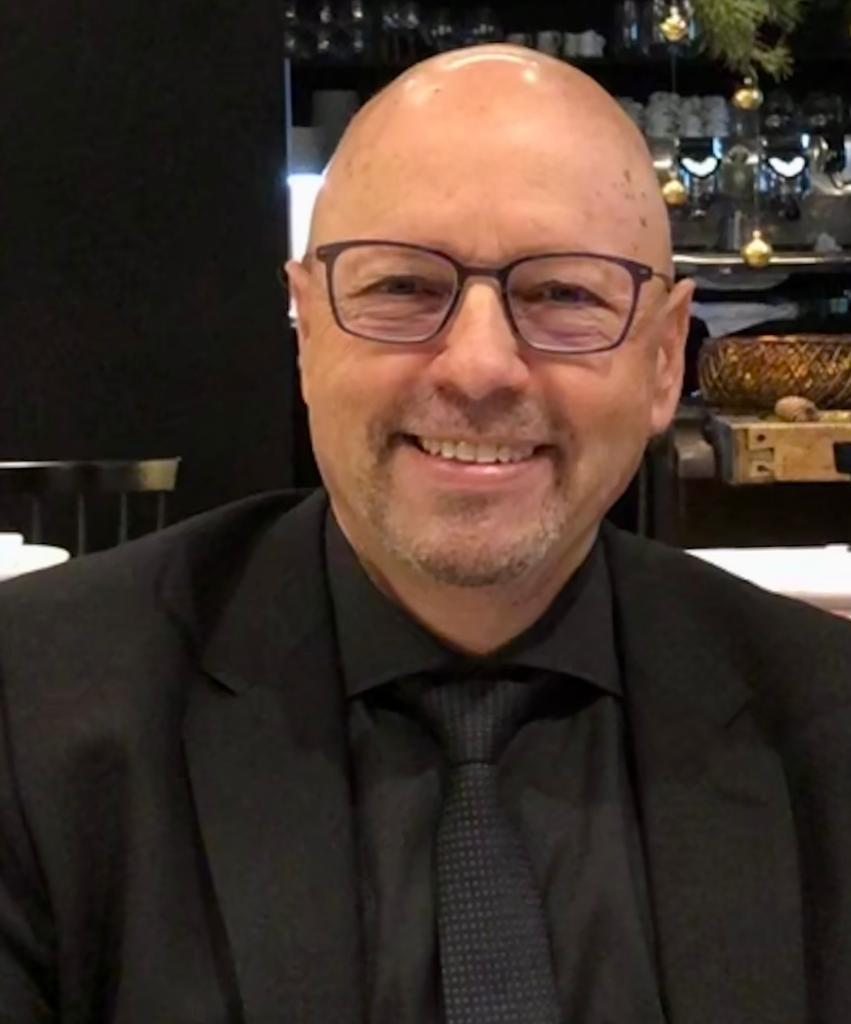
- Doron Sabag
- Occupations: Businessman, Art Patron
- Title: CEO of ORS
- Board member of: Tel Aviv Museum of Art

Doron Sabag (Hebrew: דורון סבג) is an Israeli art patron and businessman.

== Biography ==
Sabag is CEO of the human resources company ORS. He sits on the board of directors of the Tel Aviv Museum of Art. In 2002, Haaretz newspaper named Sabag as the most influential person on the Israeli art scene. He is the owner of a Tel Aviv boutique hotel where part of his collection is on show.
