= Globes (newspaper) =

Israeli newspaper

- First edition of Globes, October 17, 1983
- Type: Daily business newspaper
- Format: Tabloid
- Owner(s): Alona Bar-On, Anat Agmon
- Editor-in-chief: Naama Sikuler
- Founded: 1983; 43 years ago
- Political alignment: Economic liberalism
- Language: Hebrew, English (website)
- Headquarters: Rishon LeZion, Israel
- Country: Israel
- Circulation: 70,000 daily
- Website: globes.co.il

Globes (Hebrew: גלובס) is a Hebrew-language daily evening financial newspaper in Israel. Globes was founded in the early 1980s and published in Tel Aviv, Israel. It deals with economic issues and news from the Israeli and international business worlds. The paper is printed on salmon-colored paper, inspired by the British Financial Times.

Globes was one of the first Israeli dailies to publish its contents on the Internet, dating back to April 1995. Its web version publishes in Hebrew and English.

According to TGI 2022 media survey, Globes' market share is 4.1% among Israeli financial newspapers. Its main competitors as Israeli financial newspapers in printed media are TheMarker, of the Haaretz group, and Calcalist, published by the Yedioth Ahronoth Group.

== History ==
The daily paper founded by Haim Bar-On, the publisher of the newspaper, on the basis of a small, Haifa-based financial newspaper, in partnership with businessman Eliezer Fishman.

Following the success of Globes, it had a competitor in the form of Telegraph, which had a lower subscription price and was also printed on Saturday. Telegraph was closed after several years. A few years later, the Schocken Media Network published TheMarker economic newspaper as a competitor to Globes.

In 1995, Globes was the first economic newspaper in Israel to open an online website to publish its content online.

In 2011, Eliezer Fishman held 57.10% of the newspaper stock and Haim Bar On 42.90% of the stock of the newspaper.

== Staff and contributors ==
The chief editor of Globes is Naama Sikuler. Among the regular contributors to the newspaper are Yoav Karni, Tal Schneider, Eli Tsipori, Matti Golan, Naomi Cohen, Stella Korin-Lieber, and Dror Foer.

== Past Contributors ==
Gideon Kouts (deceased)

== Sections and inserts ==
Globes is distributed each night Sunday through Thursday, with two major parts:

- Titles – the main news part
- Capital markets – stock exchange supplement

Among the supplements / inserts:

- G – Main weekend supplement, including regular columns by contributors such as Yoav Karni (foreign affairs), Dror Feuer and Roy Yerushalmi (culinary, wine critic, food history & recipes).
- Nadlan – The weekly real-estate insert (Sundays).
- Lady Globes – A monthly magazine insert devoted to women also sold separately on newsstands.

The publishing house is located in Rishon Lezion.

== See also ==
- Calcalist
- TheMarker
- List of newspapers in Israel
