= Mati Shemoelof =

Israeli author, poet, editor, journalist and activist

- מתי שמואלוף
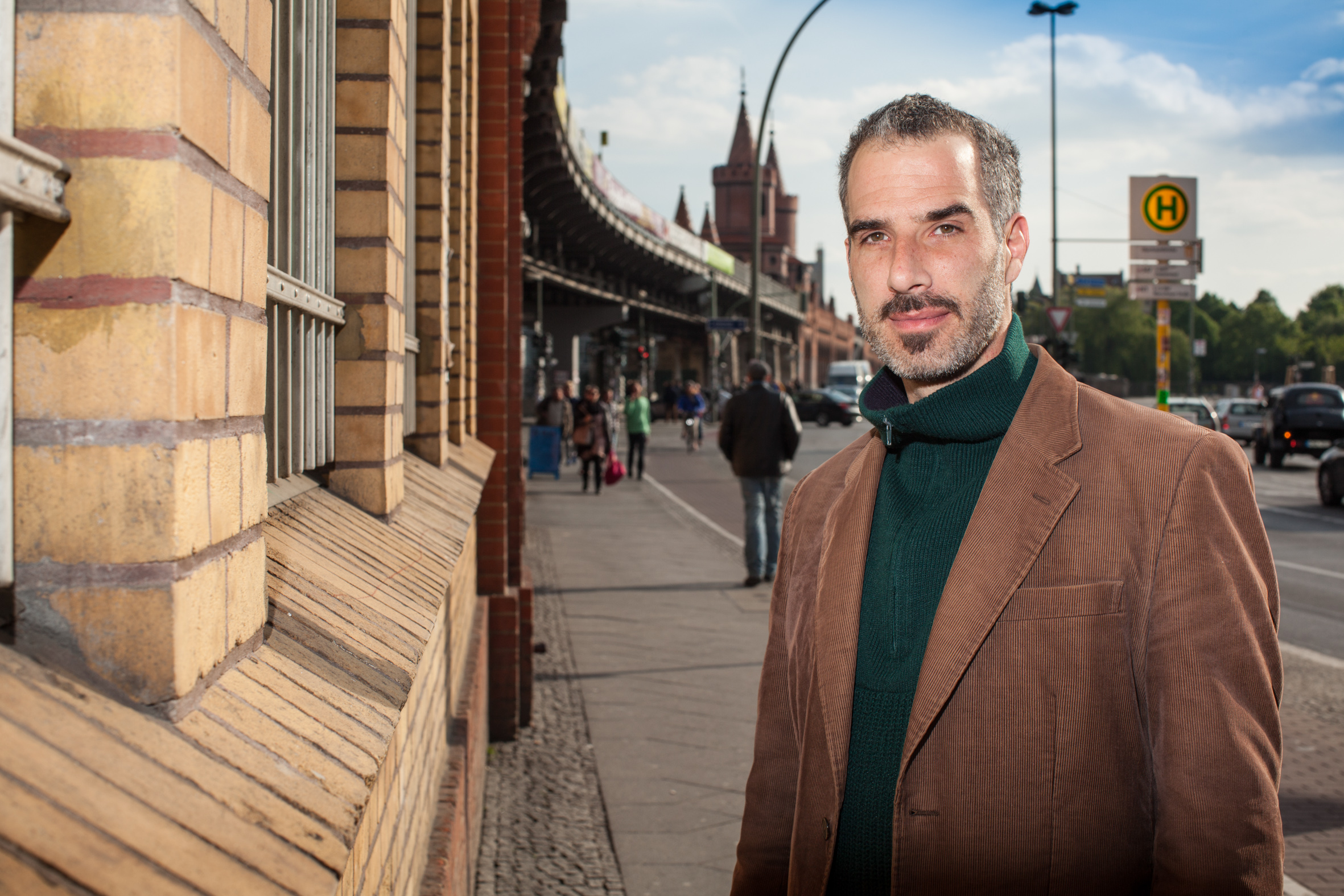
- Born: July 11, 1972 (age 54)
- Occupation: Writer
- Writing career
- Genres: Immigrant writing
- Notable work: Bagdad Haifa Berlin

Mati Shemoelof (Hebrew: מתי שמואלוף; born July 11, 1972), is an Israeli author and journalist. His first short story collection, Remnants of the Cursed Book, won the 2015 award for Best Book of the Year of "Yekum Tarbut" website. "Bagdad - Haifa - Berlin" - His first bilingual collection of poems was published in Germany by Aphorisma Verlag.

== Early life ==
Shemoelof was born and raised in Haifa, Israel. He now lives in Berlin.

Shemoelof received his BA degree from the Department of Theater at Tel Aviv University, and an MA degree in History from the University of Haifa. He was pursuing a PhD in Literature at the Hebrew University in Jerusalem, and left in order to focus on his writing.

He taught at Kedma High School in Jerusalem. He also taught creative writing at Ron Vardi Center for Gifted Children, and was a lecturer of Israeli culture at Minshar School of Art in Tel Aviv.

== Literary work ==
Shemoelof writing is diverse and includes poetry, drama, and prose. His works have won significant recognition and prizes.

Shemoelof has published seven poetry books: "The Scar Minimizer" (2001); "Poetry Between Hazaz and Shemoelof" (2006); "Why Don't I write Israeli Love Songs" (2010); "Appetite for Hunger" (2013), "Last tango in Berlin" (2014). "Hebrew from its inner outsiders" (2017).

His first book of short stories was published by Kinneret Zmora-Bitan Dvir, the leading publishing company in Israel.

His works have been translated into six languages and gained worldwide attention. A German translation of some of Shemoelof's literary pieces was done by Berlin's Literaturwerkstatt, which also invited him to Berlin to record him reading his poems on audio. English translations of his works were published in major journals, such as Zeek, Fusion, and Arspolitica. An Arabic translation of his works was recently published in several leading literary papers, including ones in Egypt and in Lebanon. Besides that, his works have been translated to Japanese and Italian.

Shemoelof was awarded several notable prizes for his works. Some notable ones are the prize for "Best Debut Poetry Book of the Year", awarded by the National Art Trust of the National Lottery, in 2001; the prize for "Best Poetry Book of the Year", awarded by the Haifa Cultural Foundation, in 2006; an Honorable Mention, awarded by the Israeli Haaretz magazine during its annual short story contest, in 2011; Best poetry book of the year (Haifa Cultural Foundation 2006); and the highly appreciated Acum Prize for advocating literature in Israel, in 2013. Additionally, his play "What Has the Memorial Day Service Become" appeared in the Small-Bama festival at the University of Tel Aviv.

In addition, he co-edited several poetry anthologies: "Aduma" (Red: An Anthology of Class Poetry), which had been sold in three editions since its first release in 2007; "Tehudot Zehut" (Echoing Identities) (2007), an anthology addressing the issues of third generation Mizrahi Jews in Israel, in which Shemoelof's short autobiographical story "The Icebergs of the Memory" was published; "La-Tzet!" (To Get Out!), is a 2009 collection of visual art pieces and poems against the war in Gaza. "La-Tzet!" represents the ideological unification of the artistic and literary society in Israel, in revolt towards the complex political situation, and it was translated and published in both English and Arabic; "Al Tagidu BaGat", which was published in 2010 and explored the influence of the 1948 Palestinian expulsion and flight on the Hebrew Poetry. Shemoelof was also the editor of the Israeli literary journal HaKivun Mizrah (Eastward) between 2006 and 2008.

He also was publishes regularly in Israel's leading media channels. He wrote a weekly column in the daily Israel HaYom (Israel Today), where he also posted literature reviews, and at Mako, the Internet news site of Keshet. Previously, he was a columnist at an Israeli news website, Ynet, (Israel's most popular news site), NRG -(Israel's #3 news site) at Ma’ariv., and at Walla!, Israel's most popular portal.

== Activism ==
The political nature of Shemoelof's literary work is closely tied to his activist endeavors. One representation of that is his contribution, as a co-editor, to the "Ruh Jedida - A New Spirit" project, an open letter from Israeli descendants of the Arab Jews of the Middle East and North Africa, to their Muslim peers living in those very countries. The letter embodies the idea of promoting change through ״intra-regional and inter-religious dialog.״.

Additionally, Shemoelof is a co-founder of "Culture Guerrilla", an Israeli movement which propagates poetry as an accessible art form, and promotes political causes by means of art performed in public. Despite the usually exclusive nature of poetry and poetry reading, the movement has achieved significant success in high-profile cases regarding contemporary economical and social events, reaching front headlines in Israel, along with several journalistic mentions abroad, the most notable of which was a New York Times article. In 2013, the "Culture Guerrilla" publishers, under Shemoelof's supervision, edited two editions of the new Mizrahi poetry collective named "Ars Poetics" that became one of the leading stages of the Mizrahi art scene in Israel. Shemoelof is also the co-founder of the Israeli Poets Union.

Shemoelof has engaged in extensive volunteer work. He was a founding member of the Haifa branch of the political info-shop, Salon Mazal. He volunteered in Keshet, The Democratic Rainbow Organization, as a researcher and spokesman for five years. He co-founded the multi-ethnical annual workshops in Tel Aviv for Ashkenazi and Mizrahi cultural movements at Beit Leyvik House for Yiddish writers. He contributed critical texts to several plastic art shows at the Tel Aviv Museum of Art and at Bezalel Academy of Arts.

Between 2006 and 2008, Shemoelof was part of MiMizrach Shemesh, an organization devoted to the Jewish tradition of social responsibility.

== Bibliography ==
=== Novels ===
- Remnants of the Cursed Book, Kineret-Zmora-Bitan publishers, 2014.
- The Prize, Pardes publishing house, 2021

=== Novellas ===
- Looking for a dead father, Booxilla, 2013
- A winter in the middle of a summer, Booxilla, 2013
- We need another time machine, Pardes publishing, 2013
- Corps in Berlin, Indibook, 2014.
- The Black River, Bombay Review, 2016.
- "Every Poison Holds Too Much Magic", Maarav magazine, 2016.
- "To the Son of a Whore", Consequence magazine, 2017.
- "Memories from Haifa", Rigorous magazine, 2018.
- "The Story of Chezi and Helena", StadtSprachen magazine, 2019.

=== As an editor ===
- Red, Ha Civon Mizrah, Maayan and Etgar, 2007.
- Echoing Identities, Am-Oved publishers, 2007. With Nir Baram.
- Eastward: A Literary Journal, No. 12, 2006.
- Eastward: A Literary Journal, No. 13, 2007.
- Eastward: A Literary Journal, No. 14, 2007.
- Eastward: A Literary Journal, No. 15, 2009.
- To Get Out!, second ed. Guerrilla Culture, 2009.
- The Influence of the Palestinian Nacba on the Hebrew Poetry, Pardes Publishing, 2010.
- The Best Poems of Guerrilla-Culture, Pades Publishing, 2010.
- We Will Not Leave: Photography and Poetry from Sheikh Jarrah, 2010.
- The Tent Poetry, Geurrilla Culture, 2011.
- Larochav Magazine, Guerrilla Culture, 2012.
- Avodat Giloy, Guerrilla Culture, 2012.
- "An Eruption from the East: Re visiting the emergence of the mizrahi artistic explosion and its imprint on the Israeli cultural narrative", Iton 77 publishers, 2020.

=== Poetry ===
- Scar Minimizer (Tel-Aviv: Gwanim Publishers, 2001).
- Poetry Between Hazaz and Shemoelof (Tel-Aviv: Yaron Golan, 2006).
- Why I Do Not Write Israeli Love Songs (Tel-Aviv: Nahar-Sfarim, 2010).
- Appetite for Hunger (Tel-Aviv: Nahar-Sfarim, 2013).
- Last Tango in Berlin (Berlin: Booxilla, 2014)
- Hebrew from its inner insiders (Haifa: Pardes, 2017)
- Bagdad - Haifa - Berlin: 40 ausgewählte Gedichte - Hebräisch-deutsche Ausgabe, mit einem Gedicht in arabischer Übersetzung, 2019
- Das kleine Boot in meiner Hand nenn ich Narbe: Gedichte. Parasitenpresse, 2023. ISBN 978-3-98805-012-0

=== Plays ===
- Ma Nolad Me Tekes Yom Ha’Ziicaron: What has Come of Memorial Day Service (Small-Bama) Festival, 2, The Tel Aviv University, 2003.
- Good Energy (Birobizan Theatre, Tel Aviv 2011; Under the Mountain Festival, 2012).
- Das künftige Ufer WDR. 2019.
