= Mikhl Gordon =

Yiddish and Hebrew poet (1823–1890)

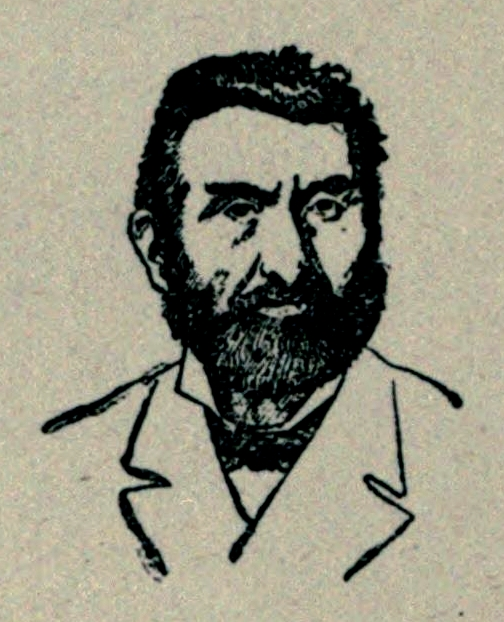
- Born: 4 November 1823; Vilna, Russian Empire
- Died: 26 December 1890 (aged 67); Kiev, Russian Empire
- Relatives: Judah Leib Gordon (brother-in-law)
- Writing career
- Language: Yiddish; Hebrew
- Literary movement: Haskalah

Mikhl Gordon (Yiddish: מיכל גאָרדאָן; Russian: Михель Гордон; 4 November 1823 – 26 December 1890) was a Russian Yiddish and Hebrew poet, author and songwriter, associated with the Haskalah movement in the Russian Empire. He is best known for his Yiddish poems and songs, many of which became part of the popular repertoire.

== Early life ==
Mikhl Gordon was born in Vilna (then part of the Russian Empire) in 1823. His father, Aaron David Gordon, was the author of Apik neḥalim (Vilna, 1836), a religious work in the style of Moshe Chaim Luzzatto's La-yesharim tehillah. His great-uncle, Yisrael Gordon, was the Crown rabbi of Vilna.

Gordon began writing poetry and prose during his studies at bet midrash. At the age of 16, he was betrothed to Neḥamah Gordon, the sister of Judah Leib Gordon. They married three and a half years later, and Gordon lived with his in-laws for seven years after their marriage. Mikhl Gordon played a formative role in encouraging his brother-in-law's literary and educational development.

As a young man, he came under the influence of Avraham Dov Lebensohn and became a member of his circle of Maskilim (intellectuals associated with the Haskalah movement). He became a close friend of Lebensohn's son, Micah Joseph Lebensohn, and developed close personal ties with other prominent Jewish literary figures of the time, including Wolf Kaplan and Hirsch Katzenellenbogen.

His first published poem appeared in Ḳol Bokhim, a collection released by Kalman Schulmann upon the death of Mordecai Aaron Günzburg (Vilna, 1846).

== Career ==
After the death of his first wife, Gordon remarried into another Maskilic family in Zagare. There he began composing songs in Yiddish, but hesitated to publish them out of concern for his reputation. Instead, these songs initially circulated in manuscript form or orally, often without attribution. A collection of his Yiddish poetry appeared in 1868 under the title Di bord, un dertsu nokh andere sheyne Yidishe lider ('The Beard, and Other Beautiful Yiddish Songs'), containing 17 songs and poems. Fearful of backlash from the Hassidic communities he satirized, Gordon published the work under an anagrammatic pseudonym.

During this period, he became an influence on Yankev Dinezon, with whose parents he lived for a time.

Gordon struggled financially throughout his life. He lacked formal education, did not learn a trade, and was unsuited to commercial work. After the Crimean War, Gordon moved to Poltava and from there to Krementchug, where he briefly worked in the office of Joseph Günzburg. However, he was dissatisfied and decided to devote himself instead to teaching. In 1868 he was hired as private tutor by the Brodski family in Shpola, and continued working for them in Smyela until 1881.

Gordon's first collection under his own name, titled Yiddishe Lieder, was published in Warsaw in 1889. It reprinted older poems alongside new works. Personally affected by the violence of the pogroms of 1881, and the death of his second wife in Cherkasy in 1884, the new poems took a more melancholic tone and expressed disillusionment with the Haskalah.

== Death and legacy ==
Following a cancer diagnosis in 1889, Gordon relocated from Pyriatyn to a hospital in Kiev. He died there alone in 1890 at the age of 67. Only members of the burial society were present at his funeral. He was buried in the old Jewish cemetery near the grave of the Malbim. His gravestone bore the last two stanzas of his poem Mayn letster tog ('My Final Day').

Though his death went largely unnoticed in the press, tributes followed in subsequent years. Y. L. Peretz published an obituary in Di Yidishe Biblyotek (1891), while writers such as Shimen Frug and Y. Y. Weissberg composed memorial poems and essays. Gordon would become recognized as an important influence on later Yiddish writers, including J. L. Gordon, Frug, and Mark Warshawsky.

== Work ==
Gordon is best known for his Yiddish songs and poetry, which had a powerful popular appeal. They are noted for their satire and emotional depth, often addressing themes such as marriage and motherhood. Many of Gordon's songs were set to music, and became well-known throughout the Russian Empire. Over time, some were adapted into simplified folk versions, which entered the broader Yiddish folk and klezmer repertoire and continue to be performed to the present day.

In addition to poetry, Gordon authored a number of non-fiction works in both Yiddish and Hebrew. He published a Yiddish-language history of Russia in 1869. In 1881 he published in St. Petersburg, under the title of Tiferet banim, a treatise on moral education for Jewish children. Another significant work, Shever ga'on, appeared in 1883 as a joint publication with Y. Y. Weissberg's Ga'on ve-shevro.

Gordon was also a contributor to the Hebrew periodicals Ha-Shaḥar, Ha-Boker Or, and Ha-Karmel.

=== Notable songs ===
Many of Gordon's early songs and poetry emphasized social reform, often using satire to challenge superstition and ignorance within traditional Jewish communities, especially the Hassidim. His popular 1869 poem Shtey oyf, mayn folk! ('Arise, My People!'), inspired by the reforms of Alexander II, called upon Jews to abandon insular and regressive practices in favour of education and national renewal.

One of his best-known songs, Di bord ('The Beard'), features a devout wife lamenting her husband's returning home without his beard. Another song, Di mashke ('The Whisky'), gained widespread popularity after being set to an anonymous melody. Satirizing the excessive use of alcohol in Jewish life-cycle events, the song's narrator recounts how whisky featured prominently in key moments of his life: his parents' courtship, his circumcision feast, bar mitzvah, and wedding.

Gordon's song Di shtifmuter ('The Stepmother') is an emotional ballad about an orphaned child suffering abuse. In the poem, a deceased mother pleads with God on behalf of her child, ultimately comforting him from beyond the grave. The piece inspired numerous folk variations, including a version titled Afn beys-oylem ('At the Cemetery').

== Selected publications ==
- Di bord, un dertsu nokh andere sheyne Yidishe lider [The Beard, and Other Beautiful Yiddish Songs] (in Yiddish). Zhitomir: A. Sh. Shadov. 1868.
- Di geshikhte fun Rusland [The History of Russia] (in Yiddish). Zhitomir: A. Sh. Shadov. 1869.
- Tiferet banim [The Glory of Children] (in Yiddish). St. Petersburg: A. Y. Goldenblum. 1881.
- Shever ga'on [The Ruin of Greatness] (in Hebrew). Warsaw: Baumritter. 1883.
- Shirey M. Gordon / Yudishe lider fun Mikhl Gordon [Songs of M. Gordon] (in Yiddish). Warsaw: Y. Alapin. 1889.
