= Modern Hebrew poetry =

Poetry written in Hebrew after its revival

Modern Hebrew poetry is poetry written in the Hebrew language. Moshe Chaim Luzzatto is considered one of the earliest modern Hebrew poets.

== History ==
Modern Hebrew poetry was promoted by the Haskalah movement. The first Haskalah poet, who heavily influenced the later poets, was Naphtali Hirz Wessely at the end of the 18th century. After him came Shalom HaCohen, Other pioneers of modern Hebrew poetry are Max Letteris, Abraham Dob Bär Lebensohn and his son Micah Joseph, and Judah Leib Gordon. Haskalah poetry was greatly influenced by contemporary European poetry, as well as the poetry of the previous ages, especially Biblical poetry and pastoralism. It was mostly a didactic form of poetry, and dealt with the world, the public, and contemporary trends, but not the individual. A secular Galician Jew, Naftali Herz Imber, wrote the lyrics to HaTikva in 1878; this later became the national anthem of Israel.

After the Haskalah, many of the leading modern Hebrew poets were associated with Hovevei Zion. They included Shaul Tchernihovsky and Haim Nahman Bialik, who would later be considered Israel's national poet. They let go of the genre principles that were widely accepted at their time, and began writing personal poems, about the human being and the soul. In the Zionist national revival period, many arose as the literary heirs to Bialik, and the focal point of Hebrew poetry moved from Europe to the land of Israel. Women became prominent poets (Yokheved Bat Miryam, Esther Raab, Rachel and others). An expressionist genre also developed, as exemplified by Uri Zvi Greenberg and David Fogel.

In the 1930s and 1940s, a neo-symbolic style emerged as well, in Avraham Shlonsky, then Nathan Alterman, and then the Palmach age.

In the 1950s and 1960s, poets who had been raised or born in Israel (British Mandate of Palestine) were active. The poets Natan Zakh, David Avidan, Yehuda Amihai, Dan Pagis and Dahlia Ravikovitch rebelled against the style of Shlonsky and Alterman. At the same time a line of religious poets led by such figures as Yosef Zvi Rimon and Zelda emerged. These movements continue to be active to the present day.

== See also ==
- Ars poetica (Israel)
