= Miriam Mosessohn =

Russian author and translator

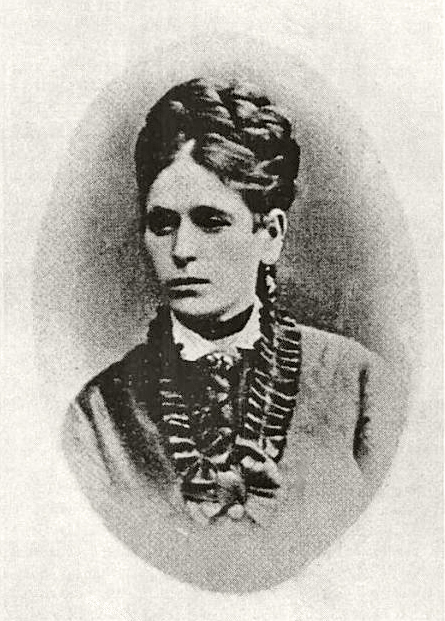
- Miriam Markel-Mosessohn
- Born: Miriam Wierzbolowska; 1839; Volkovyshki, Augustów Governorate, Congress Poland
- Died: December 18, 1920 (aged 80–81)
- Spouse: Anshel Markel-Mosessohn (m. 1863; died 1903)
- Writing career
- Language: Hebrew
- Literary movement: Haskalah

Miriam Markel-Mosessohn (née Wierzbolowska; 1839 – December 18, 1920) was a Russian author and translator of Jewish ancestry, who wrote in Hebrew.

== Biography ==
=== Early life and education ===
Miriam Markel-Mosessohn was born in Volkovyshki, Congress Poland, the daughter of a wealthy Jewish merchant, Shimon Wierzbolowki, and his wife Ḥayyah. She had two brothers, Yosef and Shmuel, and a sister, Devorah; both the daughters and the sons of the family attended the local Jewish school, where they learned to read and write Hebrew; although she did not attend ḥeder – the traditional elementary school where young boys studied the chumash (the first five books of the Hebrew Bible) – her father hired a private tutor so that she could pursue her desire to study scripture.

In 1851, at the age of 12, she moved with her family to Suvalk, where she continued her Hebrew studies under the Hebraist Judah Loeb Paradiesthal. During her two and a half years of study under Paradiesthal he also instructed her in German and, to a lesser extent, French languages and literatures. When he left to take a position as a tutor in Warsaw, Markel-Mosessohn continued her Hebrew studies independently, shifting her focus from formal study of the language to intensive reading of whatever Hebrew works she could obtain; in this way she absorbed the products of the Jewish cultural revival then under way.

=== Career ===
During the 1860s she began focusing her efforts on translation of works into Hebrew, and completed a Hebrew version of Ludwig Philippson's German-language historical novella Der Flüchtling aus Jerusalem (in manuscript).

She married Anshel Markel-Mosessohn (1844–1903) of Kovno in 1863, when she was 24 and he 19. She and her husband corresponded in Hebrew and shared an interest in the Hebrew revival; he was supportive of her writing, as well as of her efforts to publish her work. She assisted him in his business dealings at points. The two remained married for forty years, until Anshel Markel-Mosessohn's death, in 1903; they never had children.

In 1869 she published the first volume of Ha-Yehudim be-Angliya, her elegant Hebrew translation of Isaac Ascher Francolm's Die Juden und die Kreuzfahrer unter Richard Löwenherz, a historical work about the Jews in England in the era of the crusades, under Richard the Lionheart. The second volume was not published until 1895 (both volumes appeared in Warsaw). Poor health and financial problems were at least partially the cause for the long delay in her bringing the second volume to completion.

Over the course of her life Markel-Mosessohn corresponded with three prominent maskilim – her male colleagues in the Hebrew revival – Abraham Mapu, Judah Leib Gordon, and Moses Lilienblum. Mapu was the first fellow Hebrew writer with whom she initiated a correspondence, in 1861, writing to him in Hebrew and enclosing an original piece of writing. He responded appreciatively, complimenting the lucidity of her style and dubbing her a maskelet, or enlightened woman. They exchanged a handful of letters over the next year or two, and also met briefly in person on two occasions, in 1861, and again in 1866 or 1867, both times at Mapu's home in Kovno.

Markel-Mosessohn wrote to Judah Leib Gordon for the first time in 1868, after she had completed a draft of the first part of Ha-Yehudim be-Angliya, her translation of Francolm's work. Gordon responded enthusiastically to the translation; he assisted her in finding a publisher, and contributed a laudatory preface to the published volume. Their correspondence spanned 20 years, and reflected a mutually supportive friendship, although they never met in person. In 1875 Gordon dedicated to her his poem "Kotzo shel yud" ('The tip of the [letter] yud'), which evokes empathy for a modern-day woman trapped by oppressive strictures of Jewish law.. Two years later she acknowledged the honour, while writing to him for moral support, at a time when her husband had been imprisoned in connection with questionable financial dealings.

During the 1870s Markel-Mosessohn became more involved than before in her husband's business affairs, and moved several times, at one point staying three years in Danzig, and finally settling in Vienna in 1881.

She renewed her correspondence with Gordon in 1887, when she had completed the second volume of her Hebrew translation of Francolm's Die Juden und die Kreuzfahrer unter Richard Löwenherz; she requested he write a few lines for the preface of her book, and he readily complied, as pleased with the second as he had been with the first volume.

In the spring of 1887, upon Gordon's urging, Markel-Mosessohn hesitantly agreed to become the Viennese correspondent for the Hebrew newspaper Ha-Melitz, of which he was then editor. Between May and July 1887 she published four progressively more developed articles, the last two being, respectively, a report detailing the appearance of political anti-Semitism during the latest Hungarian elections in the village of Tiszaeszlár, where a blood libel had occurred five years before, in 1892; and a feuilleton about summer in Vienna, and Viennese Jewry more generally.
