= Joshua Steinberg =

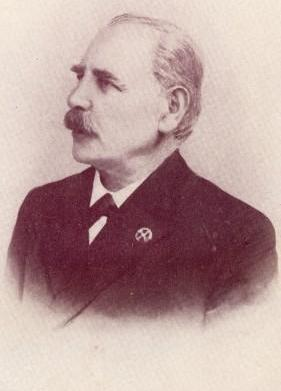
Joshua Steinberg

Joshua Steinberg (Russian: Осий (Иошуа) Штейнберг; born in Wilna 1839; died 1908) was a Russian Jewish writer and educator.

== Life ==
He graduated from the Wilna rabbinical school, and then for a short time occupied the position of rabbi at Białystok, being called to Wilna in 1861 to fill a similar position. In 1867 he was appointed head teacher of Hebrew and Aramaic at the rabbinical seminary, and in 1872 was promoted to the position of inspector, which post he held until 1904.

His persistent representations led to the Russian government in 1863 establishing in Wilna seven elementary city schools for Jewish children. Following the example of Wilna, other schools of the same pattern were established in nearly all cities containing a large Jewish population.

In 1863 the Russian government appointed Steinberg censor of all Jewish publications, both domestic and foreign. In 1887 he was requested by the government to inspect the yeshibah at Volozhin with a view to introducing into the curriculum of that institution the study of the Russian language and literature and other general subjects. Steinberg succeeded in convincing the officials of the institution of the necessity of such reforms, and they promised to carry out his plans; two years passed, however, without their complying with the request of the government, and the institution was closed in spite of Steinberg's pleadings for another year's delay.

Steinberg was the recipient of many honors from the Russian government for his devotion and many-sided activities in both literary and educational fields. A hereditary honorary citizenship was bestowed upon him, and he was decorated many times.

== Works ==
Steinberg's literary productions are many and varied. The following is a list of his more important works:

Russian: "The Organic Life of the Language" (1871), published in the "Viestnik Yevropy"; "Grammar of the Hebrew Language" (Wilna, 1871); "Book of Exercises in the Chaldean Language" (1875); "Complete Russian-Hebrew Dictionary" (1880); "Hebrew and Chaldean Dictionary of the Bible," awarded a prize by the Holy Synod; "The Jewish Question in Russia" (1882); "Complete Russian-Hebrew-German Dictionary" (1888), seventeen editions; "The World and Life," two editions; "Count Muraviev and His Relations to the Jews of the Northwestern Parts of Russia" (1889); "The Five Books of Moses," with commentary.

Hebrew: "Human Anatomy, According to the Most Modern Investigations" (1860); "Or la-Yesharim" (Wilna, 1865), an anthology from the ancient and the modern classics, written in the poetic style of the Bible, and annotated with moral reflections and observations; "Massa Ge Ḥizzayon" (1886), metric translations from the Greek Sibyls; "A Hebrew-Russian-German Encyclopedic Dictionary of the Bible" (1896); "Darwin's Theory in Its Relation to the Organic Life of Languages" (1897); "Ma'arke Leshon 'Eber," a Hebrew grammar.

German: "Knospen," a translation of Hebrew poems by his father-in-law A. B. Lebensohn; "Gesänge Zions," a translation of Hebrew poems by his brother-in-law Michael Lebensohn.
