= Mordecai Aaron Günzburg =

Leading writer of Hebrew prose (1795–1846)

- מֹרְדְּכַי אַהֲרֹן גִינְצְבּוּרְג
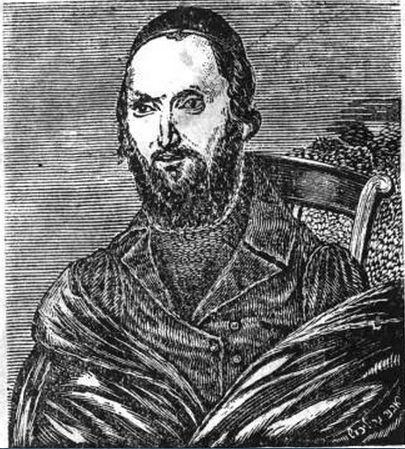
- Born: 3 December 1795; Salantai, Russian Empire
- Died: 5 November 1846 (aged 50); Vilnius, Russian Empire
- Writing career
- Pen name: Yonah ben Amitai
- Language: Hebrew, Yiddish
- Notable works: Devir (1844); Aviezer (1863)
- Movement: Haskalah

Mordecai Aaron Günzburg (Hebrew: מֹרְדְּכַי אַהֲרֹן גִינְצְבּוּרְג, romanized: Mordekhai Aharon Gintsburg, Lithuanian: Mordechajus Aronas Gincburgas; 3 December 1795 – 5 November 1846), also known by the acronym Remag (רמא״ג) and the pen name Yonah ben Amitai (יוֹנָה בֶּן־אֲמִתַּי), was a Lithuanian Jewish writer, translator, and educator. He was a leading member of the Haskalah in Vilnius, and is regarded as the "Father of Hebrew Prose."

== Biography ==
Günzburg was born into a prominent Jewish family in Salantai in 1795. His father Yehuda Asher (1765–1823), under whom he studied Hebrew and Talmud, was one of the early members of the Haskalah in Russia, and wrote treatises on mathematics and Hebrew grammar. Günzburg was engaged at the age of twelve, and married two years later, whereupon he went to live with his in-laws at Shavly. He continued his studies under his father-in-law until 1816. From there Günzburg went to Palanga and Mitau, Courland, where he taught Hebrew and translated legal papers into German. He did not stay in Courland long, and after a period of wandering settled in Vilnius in 1835.

In 1841, he founded with Shlomo Salkind the first secular Jewish school in Lithuania, which he headed until his death in 1846 at the age of fifty-one. A. B. Lebensohn, Wolf Tugendhold, and Michel Gordon, among others, published eulogies in his memory.

== Work ==
Günzburg was best known for his series of histories of contemporary Europe. His first major publication was Sefer gelot ha-aretz (1823), an adaption into Hebrew of Joachim Heinrich Campe's Die Entdeckung von Amerika, a Yiddish translation of which he released the following year as Di entdekung fun Amerike. In 1835, he published the first volume of his universal history Toldot bnei ha-adam, adapted from Karl Heinrich Ludwig Pölitz's Handbuch der weltgeschichte. (A few chapters of the second volume would later be published in the Leket Amarim, a supplement to Ha-Melitz, in 1889.) In the same genre he wrote Ittote Russiya (1839), a history of Russia, and Ha-Tzarfatim be-Russiya (1842) and Pi ha-ḥerut (1844), accounts of the Napoleonic Wars.

Among his other publications were Malakhut Filon ha-Yehudi (1836), a translation from German of Philo's embassy to Caligula, and the anthology Devir (1844), an eclectic collection of letters, tales, and sketches. Many of Günzburg's works were published posthumously, most notably his autobiography Aviezer (1863, composed between 1828 and 1845), as well as Ḥamat Dammeshek (1860), a history of the Damascus affair of 1840, and the satirical poem Tikkun Lavan ha-Arami (1864).

Günzburg's outlook was influenced by Moses Mendelssohn's Phaedon and the Sefer ha-Berit of Phinehas Elijah ben Meïr. He struggled energetically against Kabbalah and superstition as the sources of the Ḥasidic movement, but he was at the same time opposed to the free thought and proto-Reform movements.

== Selected publications ==
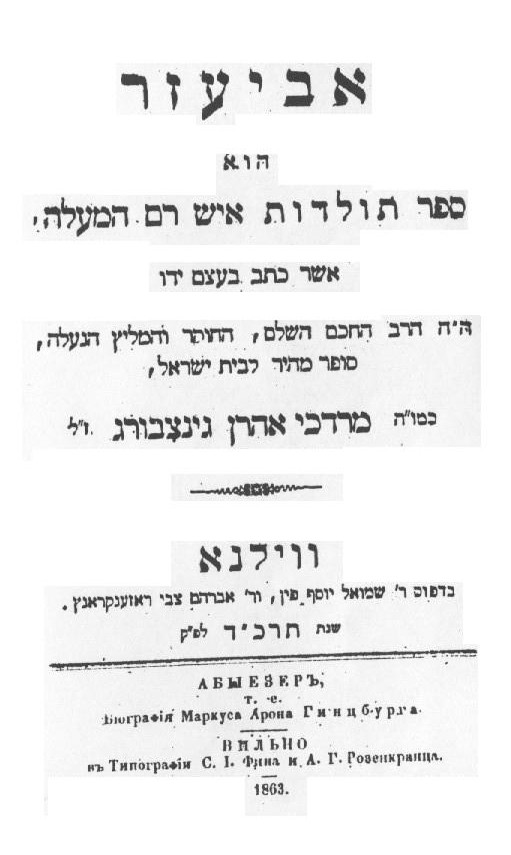
Title page of Aviezer (1863)

- Sefer gelot ha-aretz ha-ḥadashah al yede Kristof Kolumbus [Discovery of the New Land by Christopher Columbus] (in Hebrew). Vilna: Missionarrow. 1823. Later published as Masa Kolumbus, o, gelot ha-aretz ha-ḥadashah [Columbus' Voyage; or, Discovery of the New Land].
- Di entdekung fun Amerike [The Discovery of America] (in Yiddish). Vilna: Rom. 1824.
- Toldot bnei ha-adam [History of Mankind] (in Hebrew). Vol. 1. Vilna: Defus Binyamin ben David Ari' Segal. 1832.
- Kiryat sefer [Republic of Letters] (in Hebrew). Vilna: Defus Binyamin ben David Ari' Segal. 1835. hdl:2027/nnc1.cu58931899. A letter-writing manual.
- Malakhut Filon ha-Yehudi [Delegation of Philo Judaeus] (in Hebrew). Vilna: Defus Avraham Yitsḥak bar Shalom. 1836.
- Ittote Russiya [Chronicles of Russia] (in Hebrew). Warsaw: Defus Menaḥem Man ve-Simḥah Zimel. 1839. A history of Russia.
- Ha-Tzarfatim be-Russiya [Frenchmen in Russia] (in Hebrew). Vilna: Defus M. Rom. 1842.
- Maggid emet [Herald of Truth] (in Hebrew). Leipzig: C. L. Fritzsche. 1843. A refutation of Max Lilienthal's Maggid Yeshu'ah.
- Devir [Inner Sanctum] (in Hebrew). Vol. 1. Vilna: Defus Menaḥem Man ve-Simḥah Zimel. 1844. hdl:2027/nnc1.0026859629.
- Pi ha-ḥerut [Voices of Freedom] (in Hebrew). Vilna: Defus Menaḥem Man ve-Simḥah Zimel. 1844.
- Sefer yemei ha-dor [Days of the Generation] (in Hebrew). Vilna: Defus Yosef Reʼuven Rom. 1860. A history of Europe from 1770 to 1812.
- Ḥamat Dammeshek [The Wrath of Damascus] (in Hebrew). Königsberg. 1860. hdl:2027/njp.32101076527512.
- Devir [Inner Sanctum] (in Hebrew). Vol. 2. Vilna: Defus Shmuel Yosef Finn ve-Avraham Tzvi Rosenkranz. 1861. hdl:2027/uc1.ax0001254127.
- Aviezer; hu sefer toldot ish ram ha-maʻalah asher katav be-etsem yado [Abiezer] (Autobiography) (in Hebrew). Vilna: Defus Shmuel Yosef Fin ve-Avrohom Tzvi Rozenkrantz. 1863.
- Tikkun Lavan ha-Arami: shir sipuri neged ha-ḥasidim [Righting Lavan the Aramæan] (in Hebrew). Vilna: Defus Halter ve-Eisenstadt. 1894 [1864].
- Ha-Moriyyah [Moriah] (in Hebrew). Warsaw: Druk fun Aleksander Ginz. 1878. hdl:2027/nnc1.cu58952225.
- Leil shimmurim [Watch-night] (in Hebrew). Warsaw: Defus Yosef Unterhendler. 1883.
