= Julius Bučas =

Lithuanian physician and surgeon (1893–1932)

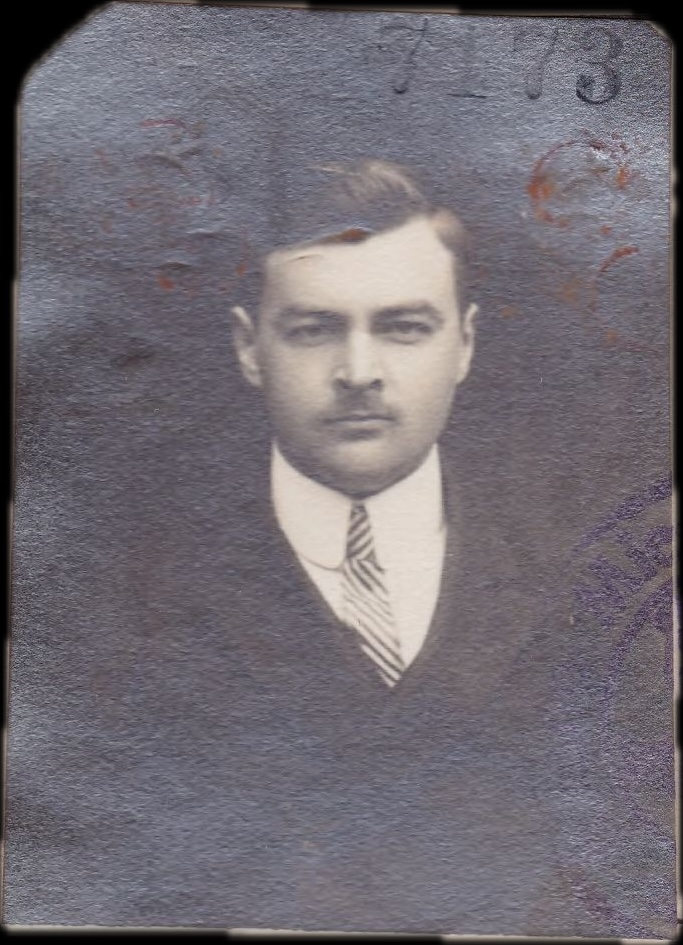
- Julius Bučas, head of the Vilkaviškis county hospital
- Born: 26 November 1893; Papušiai, Russian Empire
- Died: 7 March 1932 (aged 38); Vilkaviškis, Lithuania
- Education: University of Lithuania
- Occupations: Physician, surgeon
- Known for: Head of the Vilkaviškis county hospital

Julius Bučas (26 November 1893 – 7 March 1932) was a Lithuanian physician and surgeon. After training at the University of Lithuania, he headed the Vilkaviškis county hospital from 1930 until his death. He died at the age of 38 after contracting epidemic typhus from a patient he was treating.

== Early life and education ==
Bučas was born on 26 November 1893 into a smallholding farming family in the village of Papušiai near Naujamiesti. He attended primary school in Naujamiestis, reportedly walking some 7–8 km each way from his home village. After a year of private tutoring, he entered the Panevėžys Real Gymnasium (secondary school) in 1905 and graduated in 1912.

Intending to continue at university, he was at first held back by a lack of Latin, which was then required for admission. In 1913, he enrolled as a non-matriculated student in the medical faculty of the newly founded University of Saratov, and later that year moved to Moscow, where he passed the Latin examination. In early 1914, he entered the University of Dorpat (Tartu), first in the natural sciences and then in the medical faculty, and was active in the Lithuanian students' society there.

== Career ==
The outbreak of World War I in 1914 prevented Bučas from returning to Dorpat, and he remained in German-occupied Lithuania. He settled in Panevėžys and taught at the Panevėžys Real Gymnasium from 1915 to 1919. With the establishment of independent Lithuania, he joined the Lithuanian Army, serving as a military official from 1919 to 1924.

Resuming his medical studies, Bučas entered the fourth semester of the Faculty of Medicine of the University of Lithuania in Kaunas in March 1922, completed the course in 1925, and received his physician's diploma on 23 March 1927. From 1924 to 1927, he worked as a junior assistant in the university's anatomy department, and from 1927 as a junior assistant in its surgical clinic, where he completed a three-year surgical residency ending in 1930.

In 1930, on the direction of the Health Department, Bučas was appointed head of the Vilkaviškis county hospital. According to his obituary, he worked to improve the neglected and under-resourced hospital, which lacked adequate facilities and staff for isolating patients with infectious diseases. He was a member of the Kaunas Medical Society and contributed to the medical journal Medicina.

== Death ==
While serving as hospital head, Bučas personally treated a woman with epidemic typhus who had been brought to the hospital from the Polish border, and contracted the disease himself. After a complication, he died on 7 March 1932 in Vilkaviškis, aged 38. He was survived by his wife and son. An obituary by V. Kuzma was published in Medicina the same year. Artist Juozas Zikaras created a bas relief medallion portrait of Bučas, as part of a series for prominent Lithuanians. The medallion is held by the Dr. Jaunius Gumbys Lithuanian Art Foundation.
