= Vilkaviškis Manor =

Residential manor in Vilkaviškis, Lithuania

Coordinates: 54°38′52″N 23°2′40″E

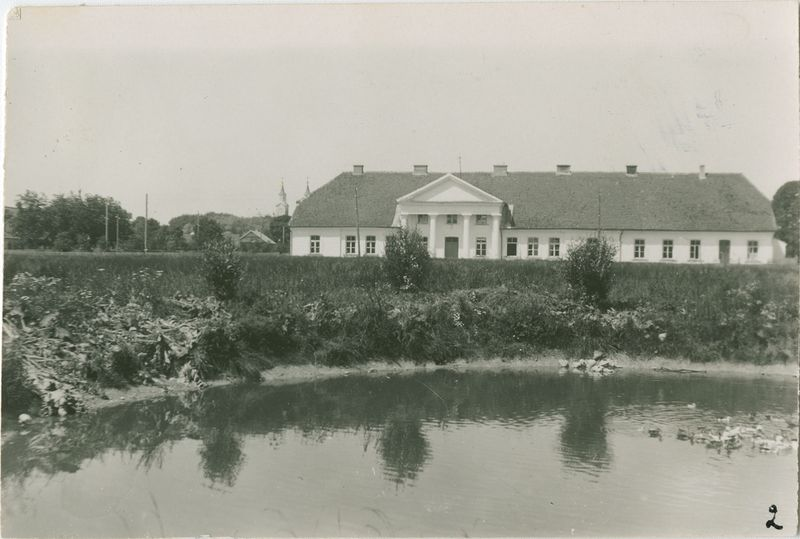
Vilkaviškis Manor in the early 20th century.

Vilkaviškis Manor is a former residential manor in Vilkaviškis, Vilkaviškis District Municipality, Lithuania. Currently it is partially reconstructed.

The manor was founded after 1744 – on 25 January 1776 in the list of taxpayers of the area of Kaunas it is indicated that in Vilkaviškis parish there is Vilkaviškis manor managed by the Ogiński family, in the city of Vilkaviškis – 39 agricultural yards and 96 yards in plots. Vilkaviškis parish priest Lachovskis had 5 yards in gardens and a hospital.

In 1812 on 19–24 June, Napoleon's army passed along Vilkaviškis. In the notes of cleric (later prelate) Butkevičius, it is recorded that on 21 June Napoleon himself arrived and settled in the Vilkaviškis manor. (Other sources mention a tent near the manor). In the vicinity of the manor, on 21 June Marshal Louis-Alexandre Berthier, Chief of the Army General Staff, issued a recall signed by Napoleon which was effectively a declaration of war against Russia.

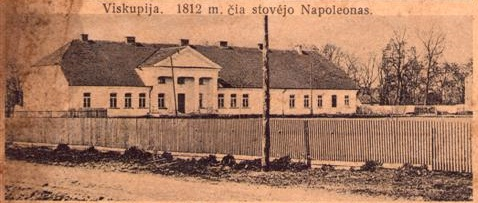
Postcard, released between 1930 and 1931.

From 1864 till 1904 a Russian army general lived in the manor, during World War I – the Germans. Later, the manor with 80 hectares was bought from the state by priest P. Karalius, after which the Vilkaviškis diocese's curia settled there, bishops Antanas Karosas and Mečislovas Reinys lived here. The manor was liquidated in 1940, during the Soviet campaign of 1940 – on 5 August the land reform law was passed. During World War II, the palace building was empty, after the war the administration of the Vilkaviškis Sovkhoz was located in it.
