= Isaac Jacob Weissberg =

Russian Hebrew writer and educator

- Born: 1841; Polonki, Minsk Governorate, Russian Empire
- Died: July 1904 (aged 62–63); Kiev, Russian Empire
- Writing career
- Language: Hebrew, Yiddish

Isaac Jacob Weissberg (Note: Also known by the pseudonyms Eḥad ha-morim, Eḥad midare mata, Aḥi tov, Iyov mi-Kiyuv, Alyeda, Elishema, Argov, Ata mi-raḥok, Ben-Tziyon, Baal-tefila, Zaken ve-ragil, Berg, Ha-levani, and Kiyuv.) (Yiddish: יצחק יעקב ווייסבערג; 1841 – July 1904) was a Russian Hebrew writer and educator. He contributed articles to various Hebrew periodicals, including Ha-Melitz, Ha-Maggid, Ha-Tzfira, Ha-Shaḥar, Ha-Boker Or, Otzar ha-Sifrut, Aḥiasaf, Ha-Shiloaḥ, Ha-Goren, Ha-Pisgah, and Ha-Tikvah.

== Biography ==
Weissberg was born in the town of Polonki, Minsk Governorate. He received his preliminary training in various ḥadarim, and then attended the yeshiva of Slonim, where he came to be regarded as one of the best Talmudic students. Later he went to Minsk, where he became acquainted with various Hebrew scholars of the Haskalah, especially with Joseph Brill (also known as Iyov of Minsk). While in Minsk, Weissberg devoted himself particularly to the study of Hebrew literature. In 1873 he established himself as a teacher of Hebrew in Kiev; many of his pupils became prominent Hebrew writers.

He made his literary debut in 1879 with the publication of a series of pedagogical articles in Ha-Melitz. His more important works include Ga'on ve-shibro, a scholarly criticism of medieval and modern literature; She'elat ha-nashim 'al pi ha-Talmud (also published in Yiddish), a work treating of the status of women according to the Talmud, as well as of the prevailing opinion regarding the authority of the Talmud; Peshuto shel Mikra 'al pi da'at (St. Petersburg, 1898), Talmudic explanations of Biblical passages; and Mishle kadmonim (Nezhin, 1901), a collection of ancient proverbs. He was the author also of exegetic notes on the Torah (published by Ezekiel Mandelstamm); and he collected and published letters by the poet J. L. Gordon, Isaac Bär Levinsohn, and Isaiah Tugendhold.

As a writer of the "old school," Weissberg defended the "purity" of the Hebrew language. He regarded negatively the desire of younger literati to broaden the language by the formation of new words and terms, and the influence of European literary movements in Hebrew literature.

He died in Kiev in July 1904.

== Partial bibliography ==
- "Ruaḥ paskanit". Ha-Boker or. 1879–80.
- Ga'on ve-shivro [Pride and Its Fall]. 1883.
- "Ha-Talmud veha-ḥinukh" [The Talmud and Education]. Ha-Asif. 2. Warsaw. 1885.
- Di froyen-frage loyt dem Talmud [The Question of Women According to the Talmud] (in Yiddish). Kiev. 1890.
- She'elat ha-nashim 'al pi ha-Talmud [The Question of Women According to the Talmud]. 1890.
- Yehuda-Leyb Gordon ve-toldatav [Judah Leib Gordon and His Life]. 1892.
- Igrot Yehuda-Leyb Gordon [The Letters of Judah Leib Gordon]. Vol. 1–2. 1894.
- Al odot ha-beurim [On the Commentaries]. Kiev. 1895.
- Divrei Yeshayah ben Ya'akov Tugendhold [The Words of Isaiah ben Jacob Tugendhold] (PDF). 1896. Archived from the original (PDF) on 2021-11-05.
- Igrot Ribal [Letters of the Ribal]. Cracow. 1896.
- Arba tekufot le-divrei ha-yamim li-venei Yisrael [Four Periods in the History of the Children of Israel]. 1898.
- Peshuto shel Mikra 'al pi da'at ḥazal [The Simple Meaning of Mikra According to the Sages]. St. Petersburg. 1898.
- Mishle kadmonim [Ancient Proverbs]. Nezhin. 1900. First published as Hayinu deamre inshe [This is What People Say]. Berdichev. 1893.
