= Aharon April =

Artist (1932–2020)

Aharon April אהרון אפריל
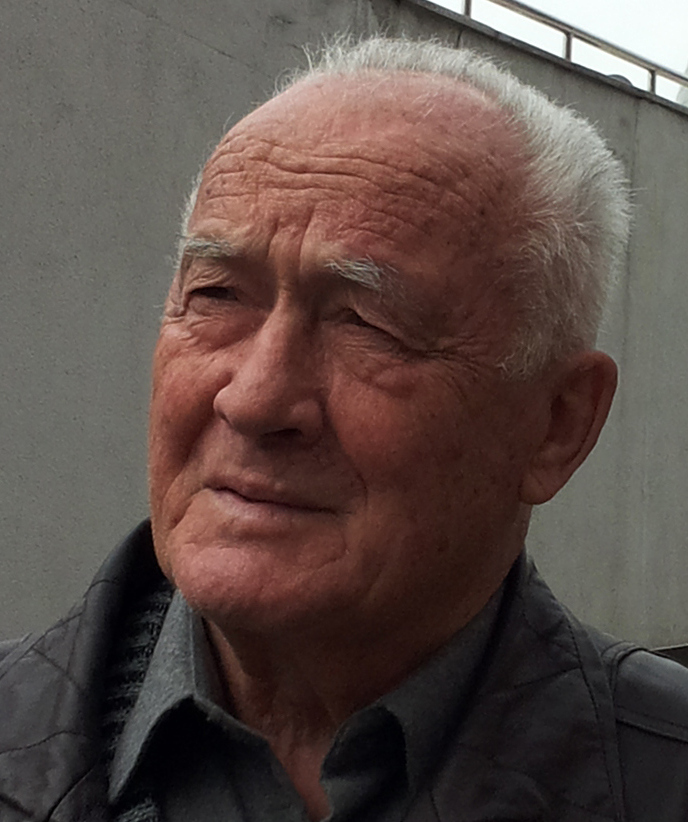
- Born: 6 June 1932; Lithuania
- Died: 12 February 2020 (aged 87); Jerusalem
- Education: Surikov Academy of Fine Arts
- Known for: Painting, Sculpture

Aharon April (Russian: Аарон Исаакович Априль; Hebrew: אהרון אפריל) was a contemporary Israeli artist born in Lithuania in 1932. His works are in major public and private collections in Europe, Russia and United States. 48 of his works are in museums around the world.

== Biography ==
April was born in Vilkaviškis, Lithuania in 1932 to a Jewish family. The family was exiled to Siberia in 1941, where April grew up and got his first impressions of the bleak colors of the northern land. In 1948 he managed to enter the Moscow Art School in Memory of 1905; then was forced to return to Siberia when Soviet authorities launched an anti-Semitic campaign known as “The Doctors’ Plot.” April graduated from an art school in the city of Yakutsk, and pursued his interest in history by attending lectures at a local pedagogical institute. An opportunity to study in Moscow arose after the death of Stalin, and in 1960, April graduated from the Surikov Academy of Fine Arts. He immigrated to Israel in 1972, where he lived till his death on 12 February 2020.

== Artistic career ==
After his graduation from the Surikov Academy of Fine Arts April took part in many national and international exhibitions. April's first solo exhibition “Behind the Seven Seas” took place at Moscow in 1971. The works centered on the artist's experience of sailing to India on board a trading ship. A new chapter of April's life and work began in 1972 after he received permission to immigrate to Israel and settled down in Jerusalem. April held many regular personal exhibitions in Israel, North America, Germany, Switzerland, France and Russia In 1975-76 he held the Chairman position of the Jerusalem artists and sculptors association and was teaching art till 1983 in the University of Haifa, the Hebrew University of Jerusalem and the Bezalel Academy of Arts and Design. In 1991 April became the Manager of Sa-nur Artists' Village (An artists’ community consisted of immigrants from the Soviet Union), a position he held till 1999. In 2001, April was awarded the Ish-Shalom Foundation Prize for the “Special Achievements in the Development of Art” and in 2005 he was elected as honorary member of the Russian Academy of Arts.

== Artistic style ==
The art style of Aharon April moves from contemplative figurativism to expressive symbolism. April's paintings impress with their colorful, temperamental riot of colors (Victoria Khan-Magomedova). However, within this chaos, one can find subject and content. Critics (Victoria Khan-Magomedova, Mathy Fisher) noted that Aharon April is one of those artists who can tame the chaos, prompting viewers to formulate answers to the questions posed by the artistic work, and solve the mystery of it. There lies the leading value of the artwork (like Salvador Dali and others). From the seemingly erratic pulsating strokes, one can discover crop faces, figures and even biblical characters (Efgraf Kontchin). Color in April's paintings has special meaning (largely because of extensive experience in watercolor), which combines the finest nuances of color combination of Mediterranean nature and compositions involving biblical and universal themes (Wladimir Prokhorov, Mathy Fisher).

== Selected works ==
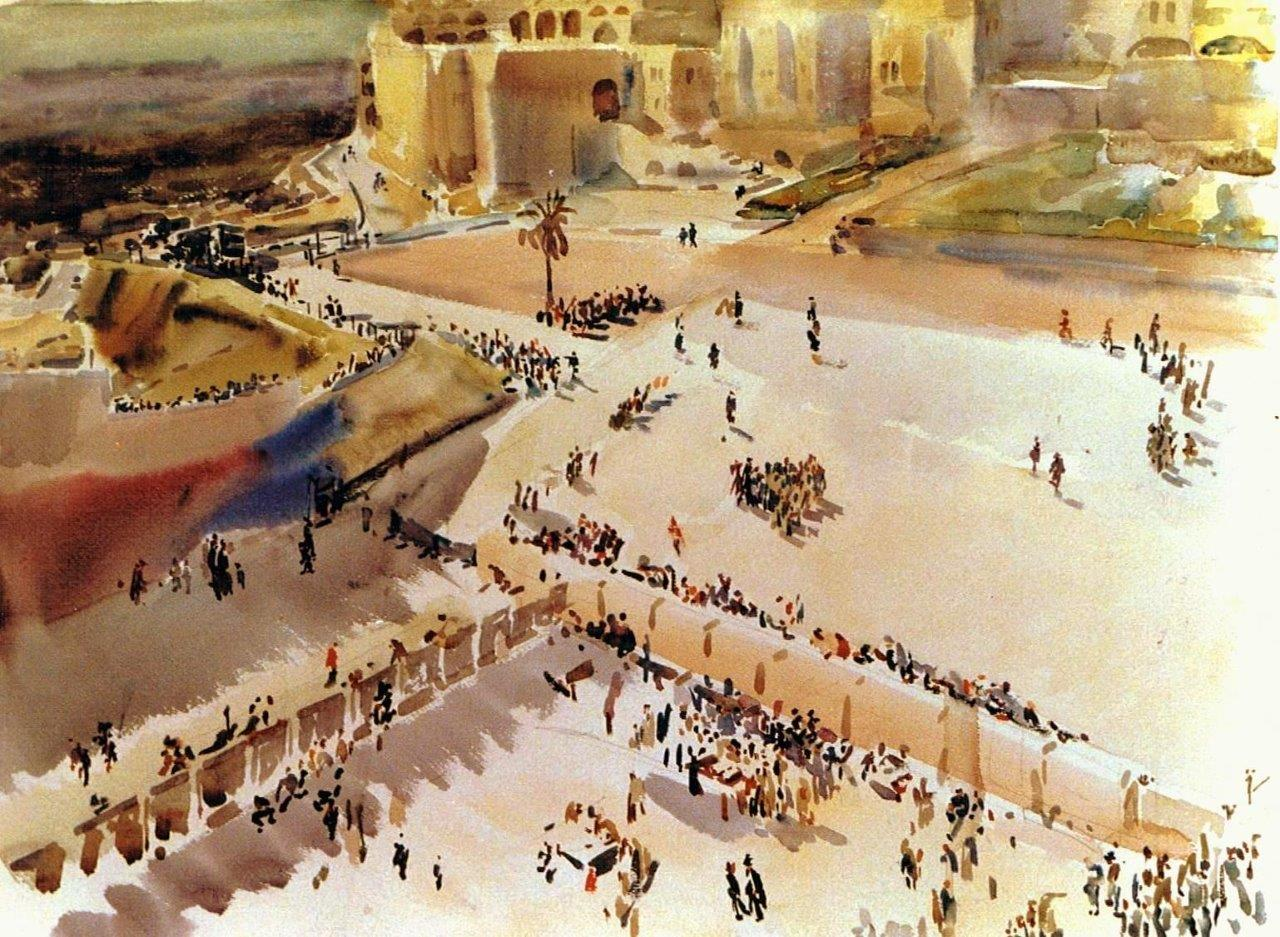
Beside the western wall

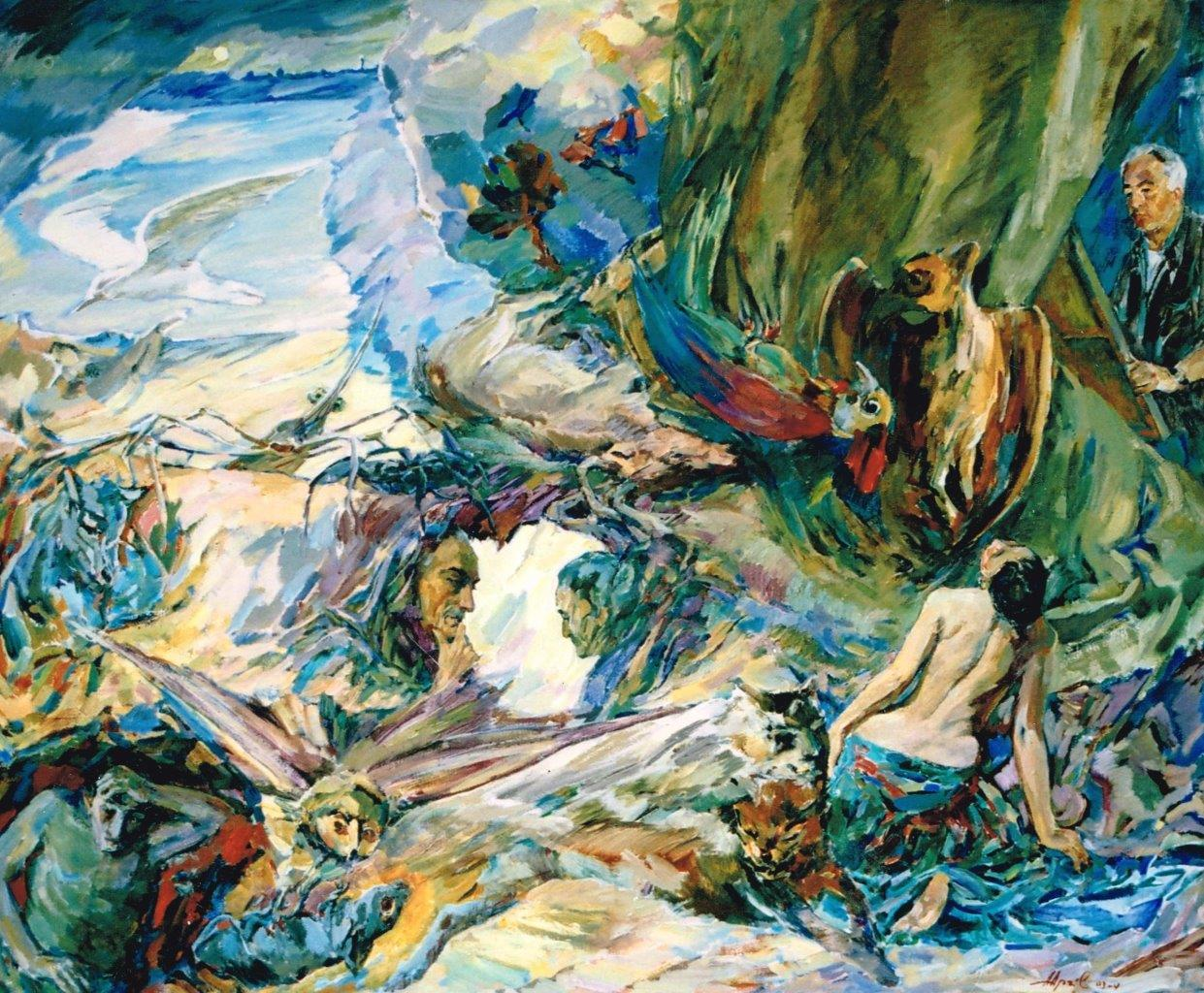
"Capricious of Memory"

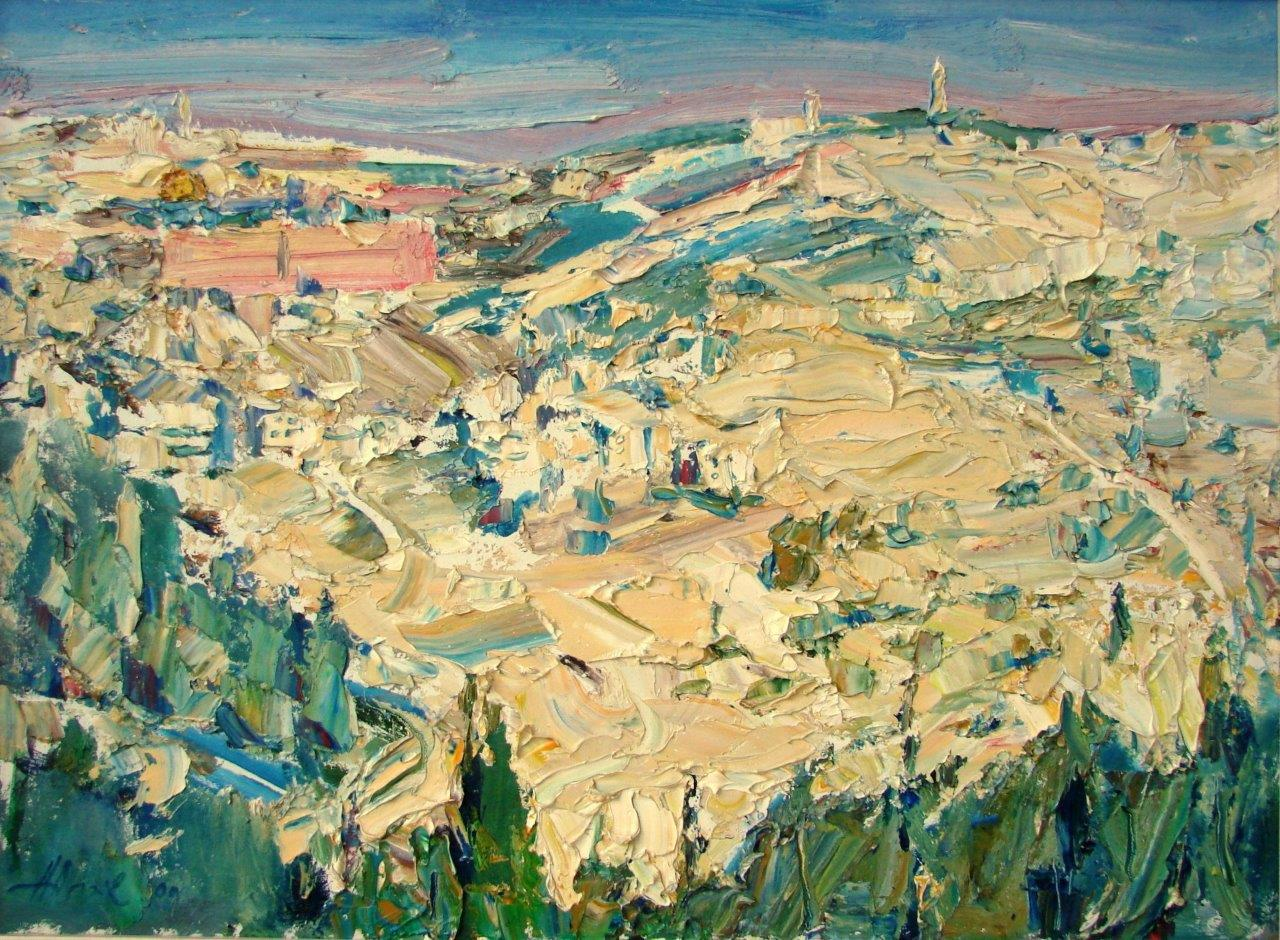
"Davids Old City"

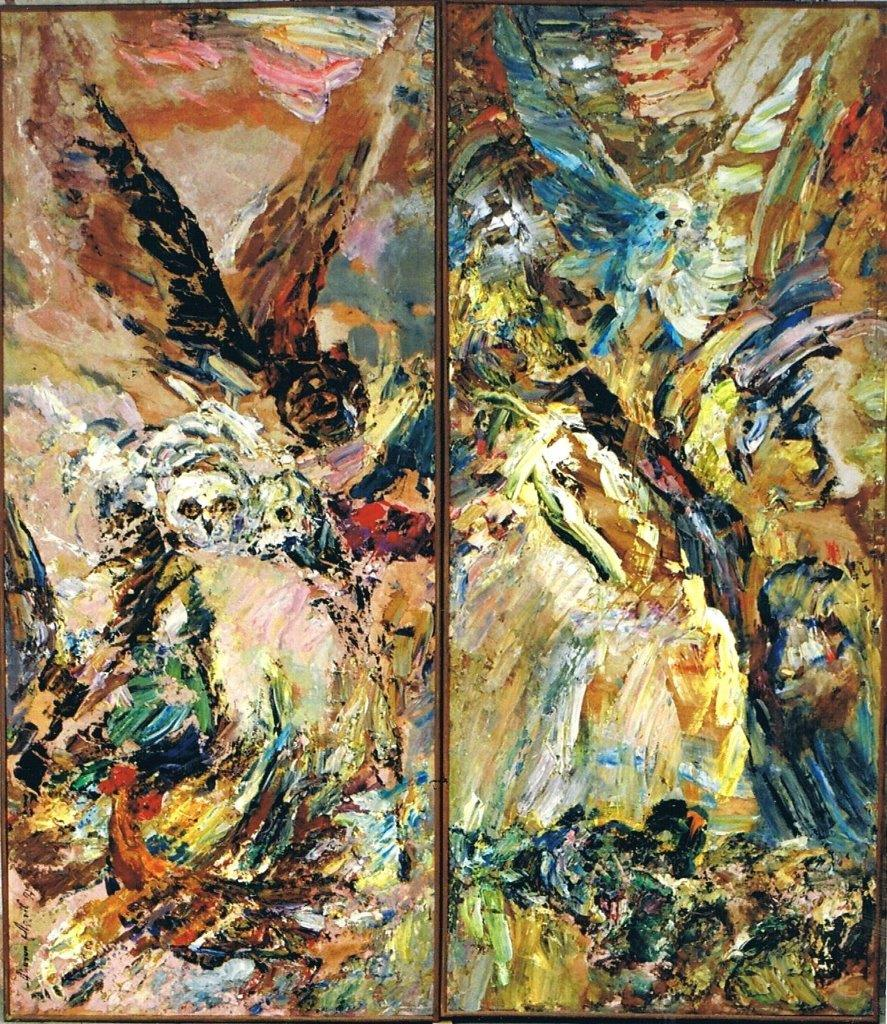
Diptych "Crowded in the Sky"

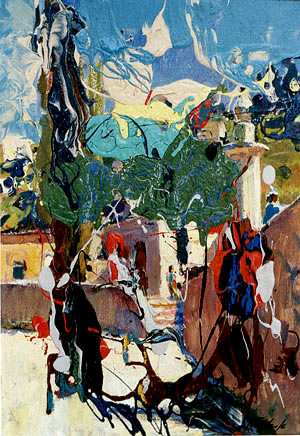
"Ein Kerem, Near the spring"

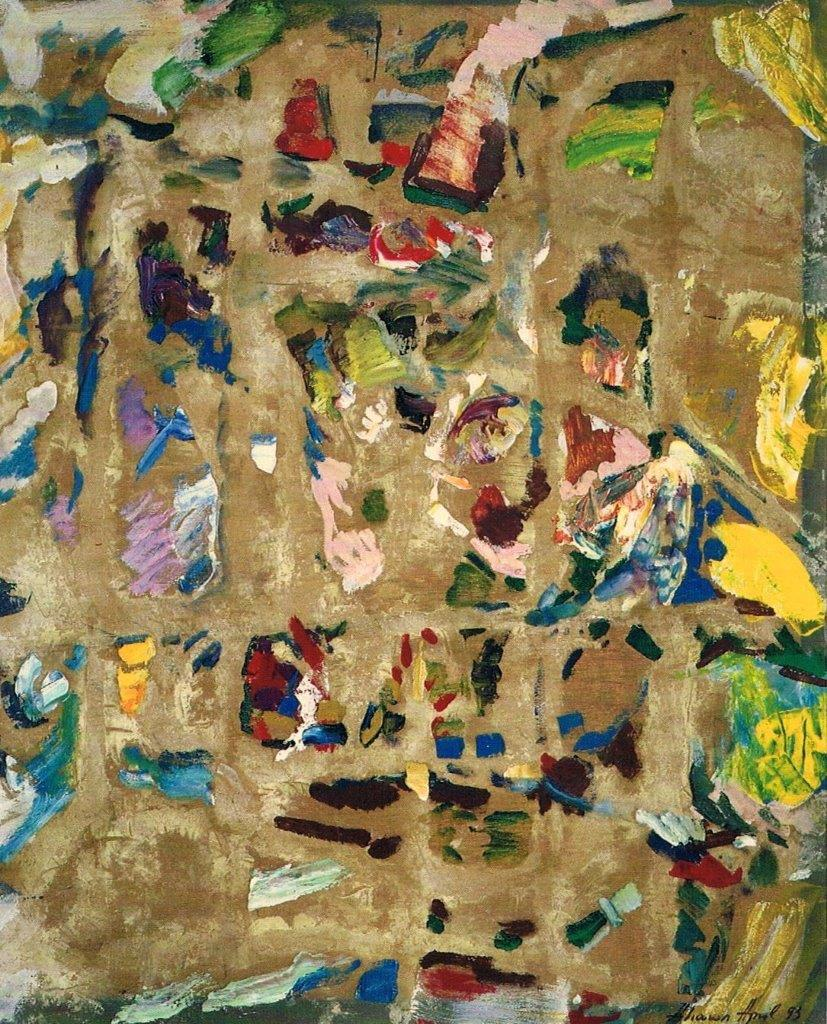
"Gathering"

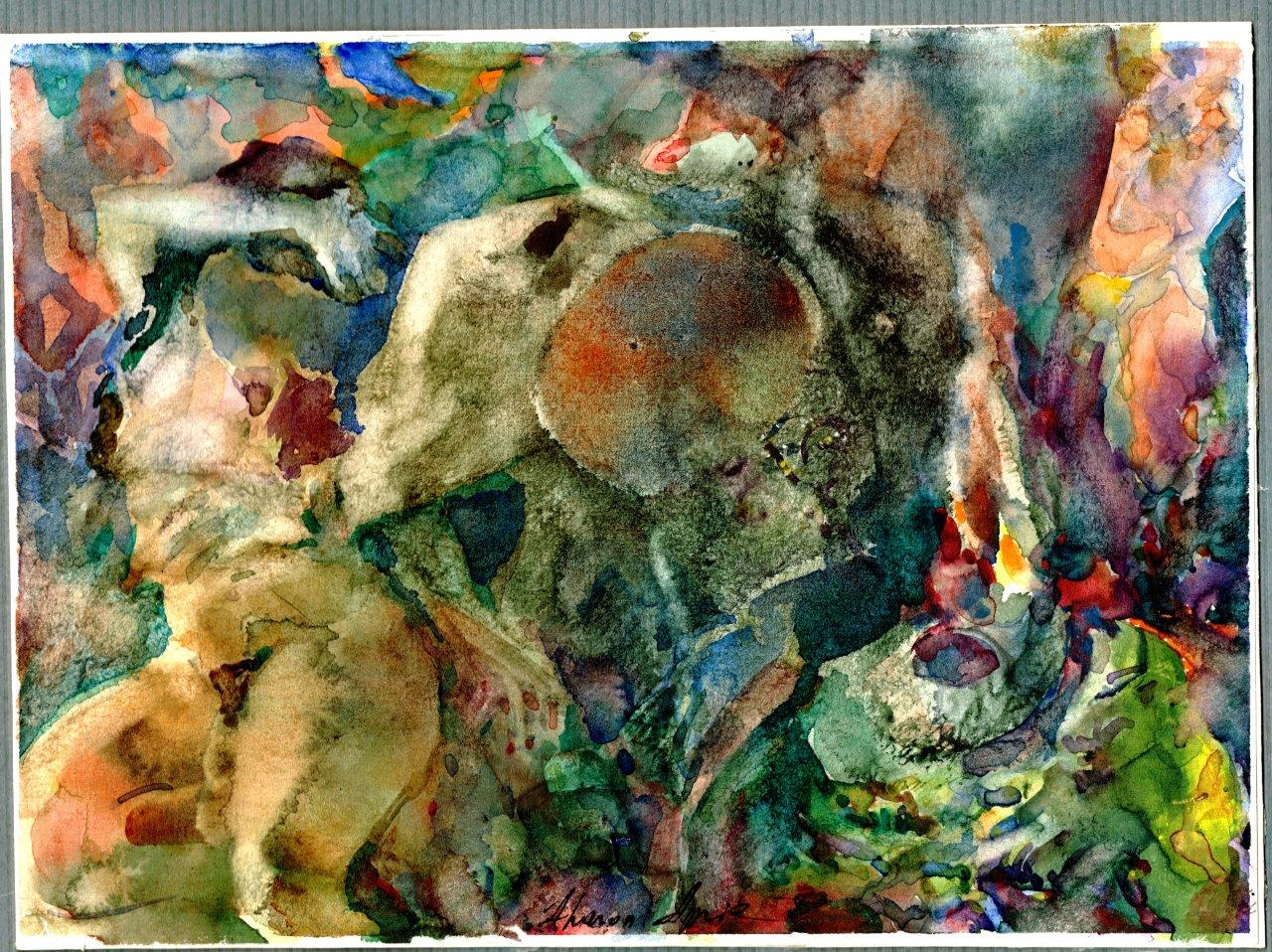
"Herod's Nights"

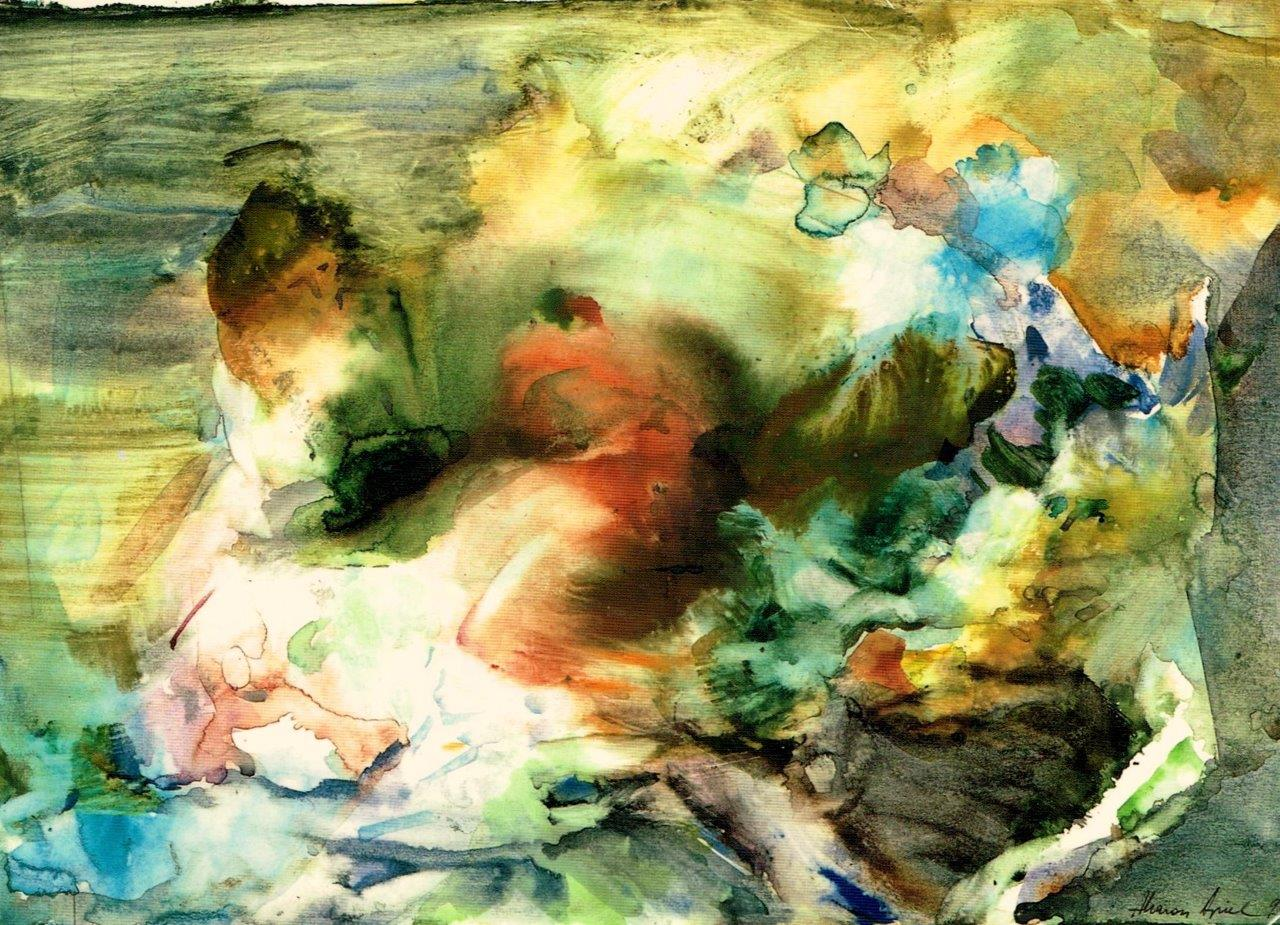
"Lot and his daughters"

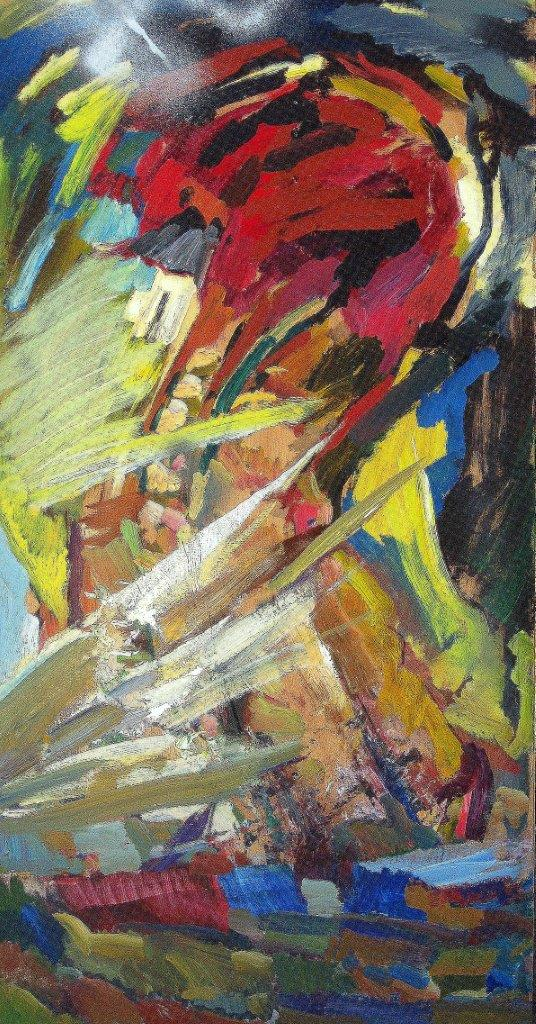
"Pain"

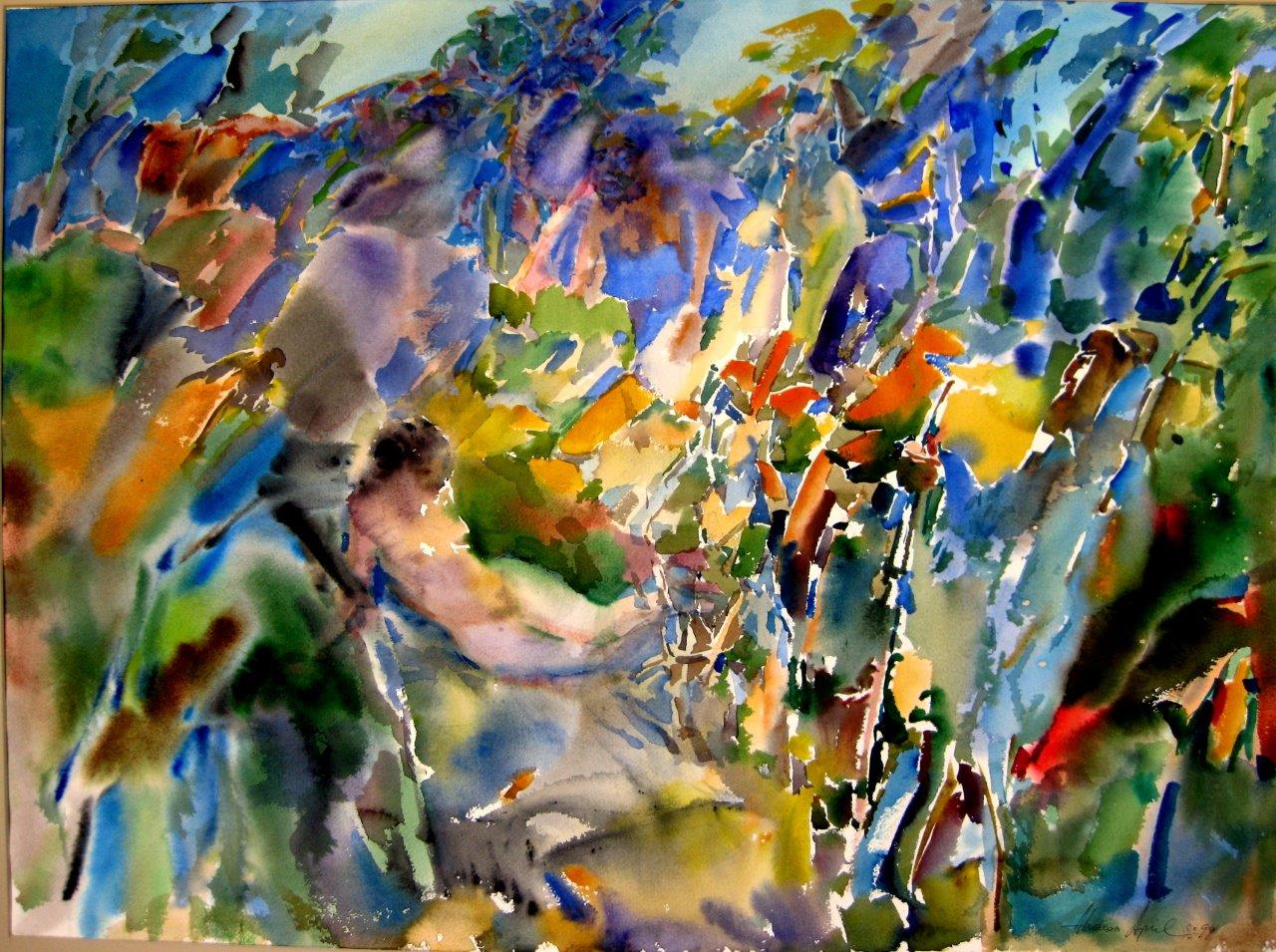
"Song of Songs-Last"

== Selected Albums and Books ==
- "Aharon April", Introduction by Jean Bollack (Paris: Galerie Rambert, 1995).
- "Aharon April", Introduction by Matti Fisher (Moscow: MOMMA, 2002).
- "Aharon April", Introduction by Marina Genkin (Moscow, Scanrus 2007).
- "To Love Is Always Classical..." By Aharon April and Galina Podolsky, Jerusalem 2012, ISBN 978-965-7129-71-5
- "Diptych Of Destinies" By Galina Podolsky and Aharon April, Jerusalem 2013, ISBN 978-965-7621-00-4.
- "To a mighty hand and honest colors (artists memories)" By Aharon April, Jerusalem 2016, ISBN 978-965-7705-08-7

== Video ==
- "Unconscious Reality", 2014.
- "Creation", 2000.
- "Song of Songs", 2001.
- "The Other Side Of The Canvas", 2000.
- Link to All 4 videos
