= Mlokhim-Bukh =

Yiddish religious epic

The Mlokhim-Bukh (lit. 'Book of Kings') is a Yiddish religious verse epic by an unknown author, which recounts the monarchy of Solomon and the ancient history of the Hebrews up to the Babylonian Captivity. The oldest surviving fragment is dated to 1519–1525, though the poem is probably older. Its stanzaic form resembles that of the Nibelungenlied.

The poem fuses Biblical material, Midrashic legends, and rabbinical folklore with European courtly poetry, and belongs to the genre of the Ashkenazic national epic, comparable to other European epic poems, such as the Nibelungenlied and The Song of Roland. However, in contrast to the more chivalry-themed Shmuel-Bukh, it is more ethical and historical in nature.
