= Vilkaviškis =

Town in Suvalkija, Lithuania

- City
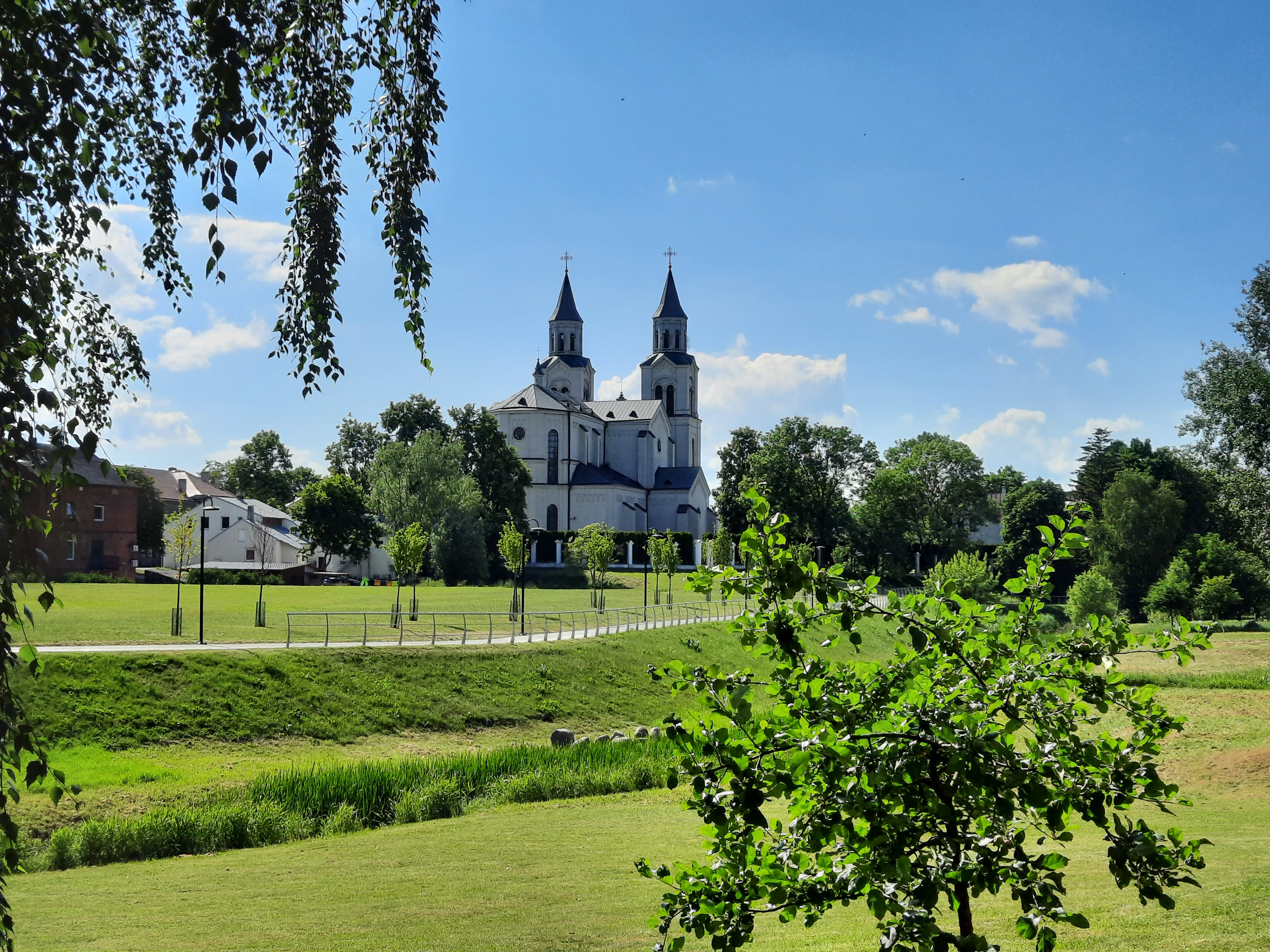
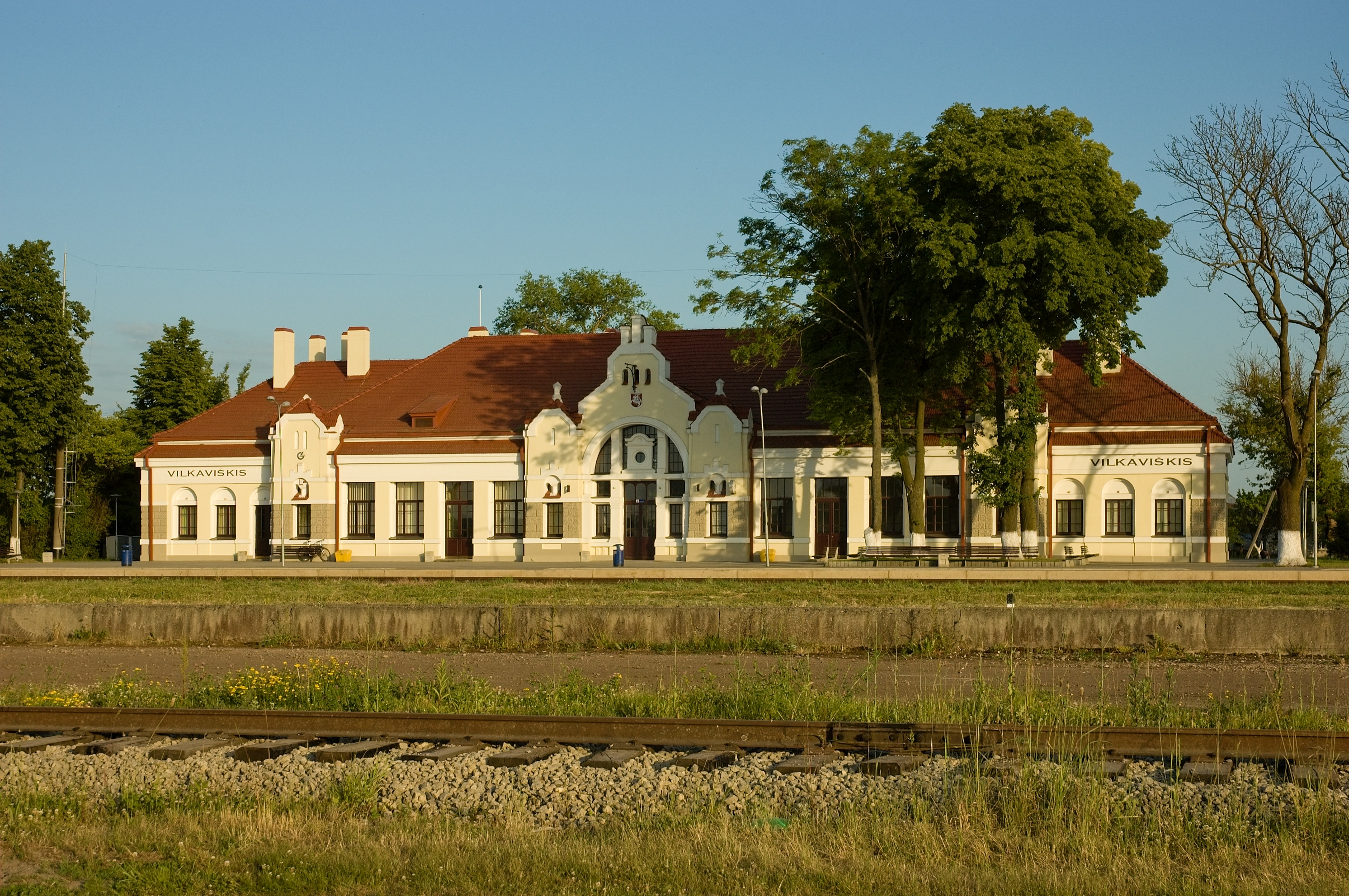
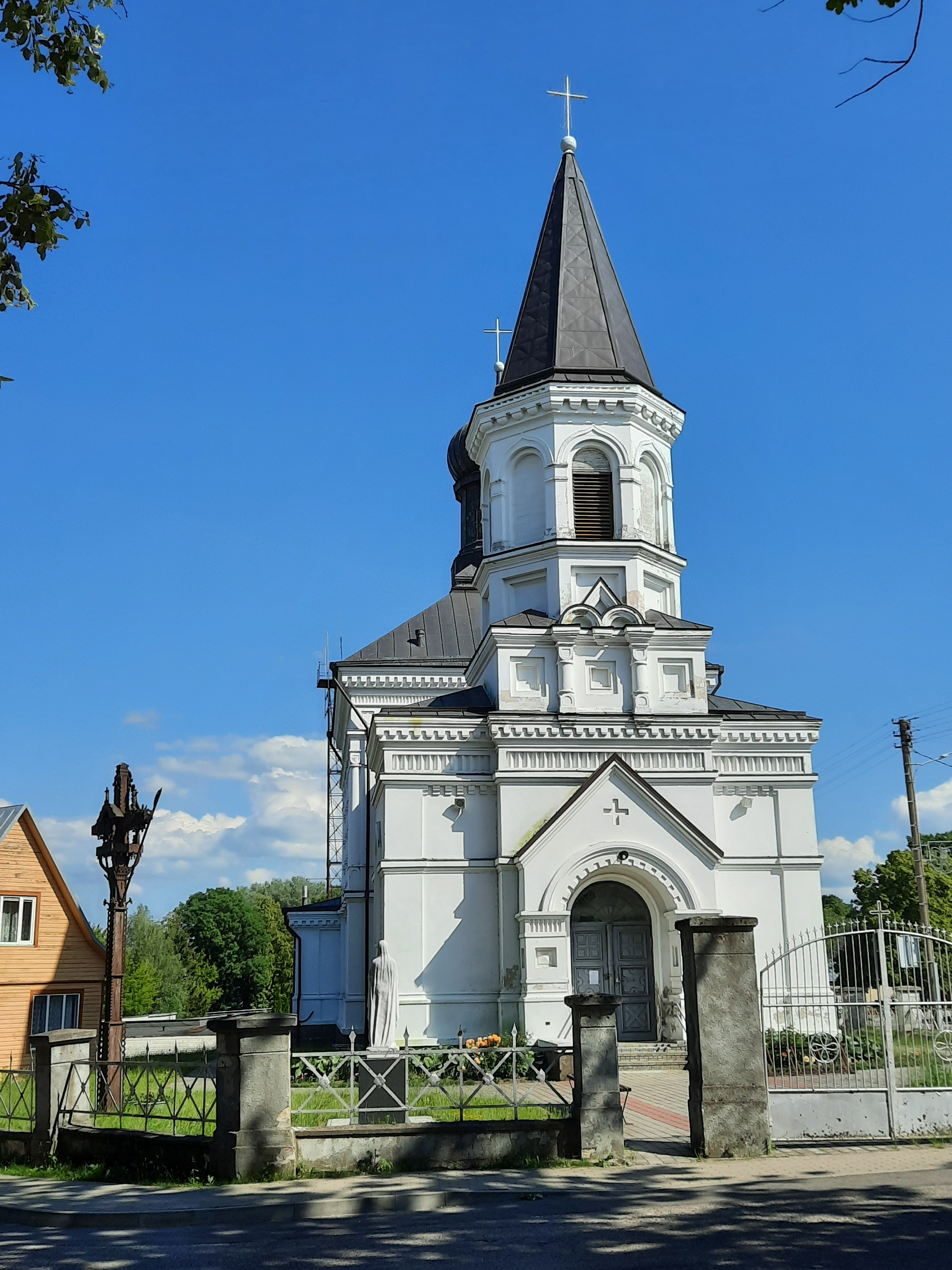
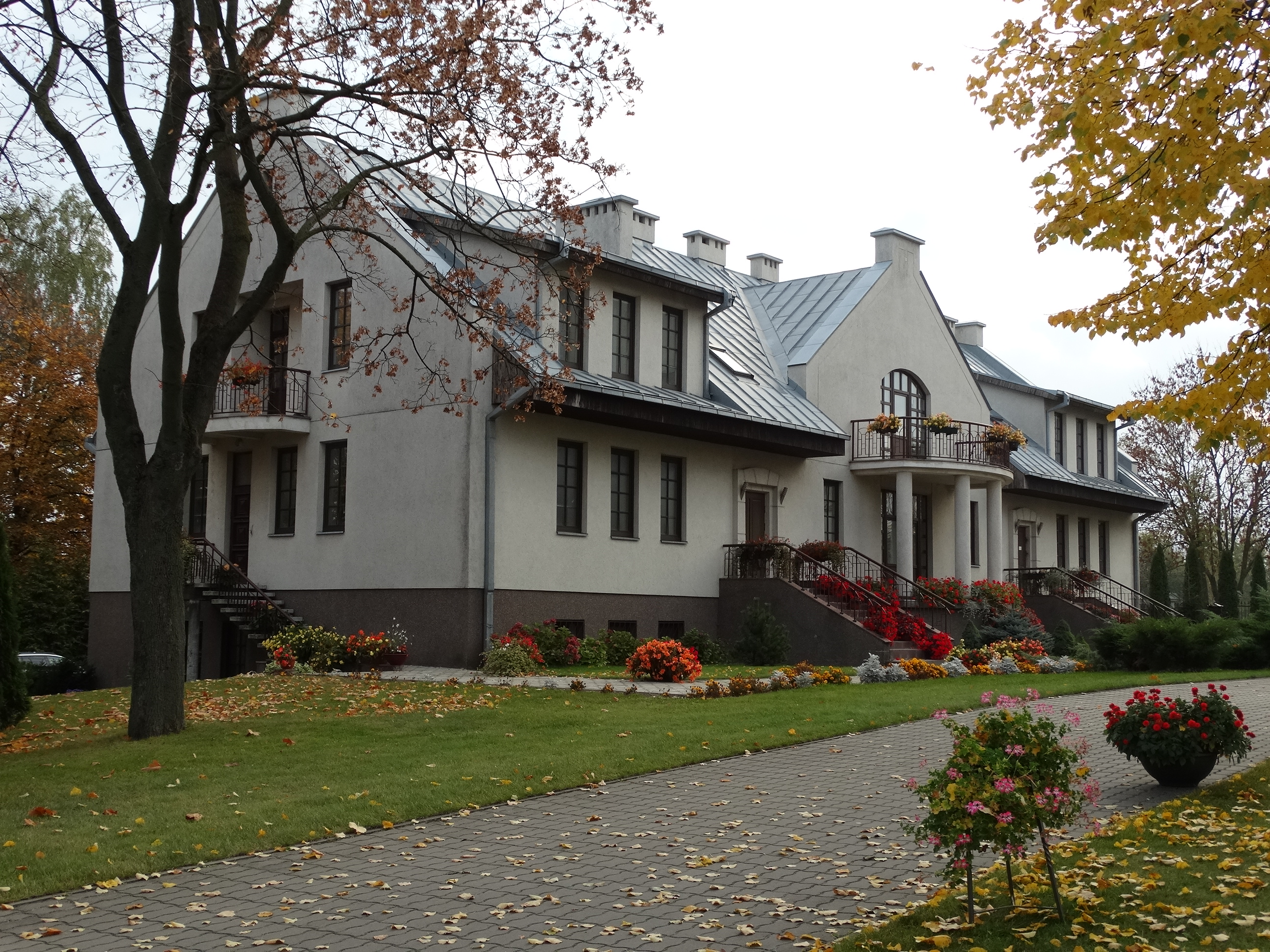
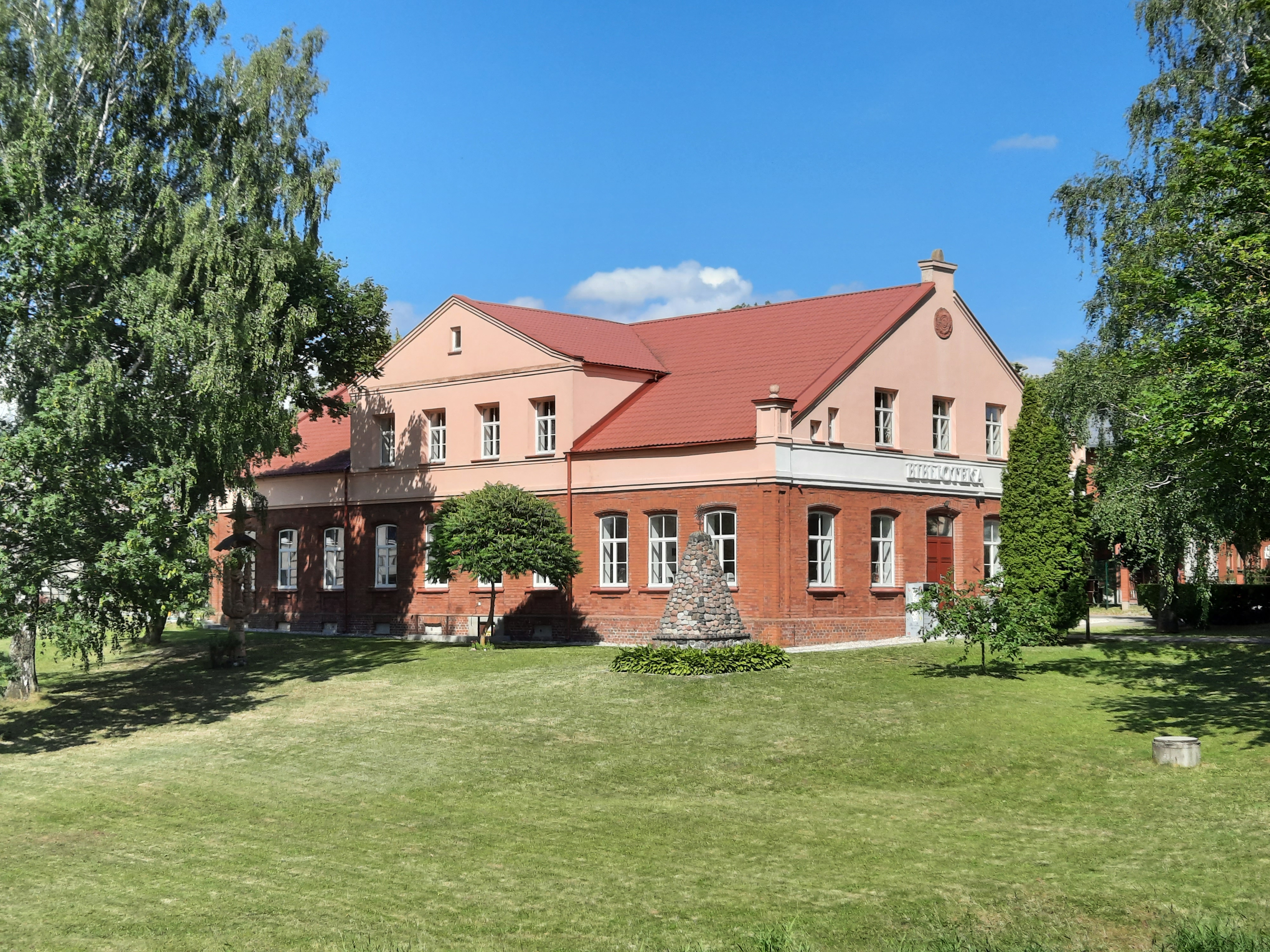
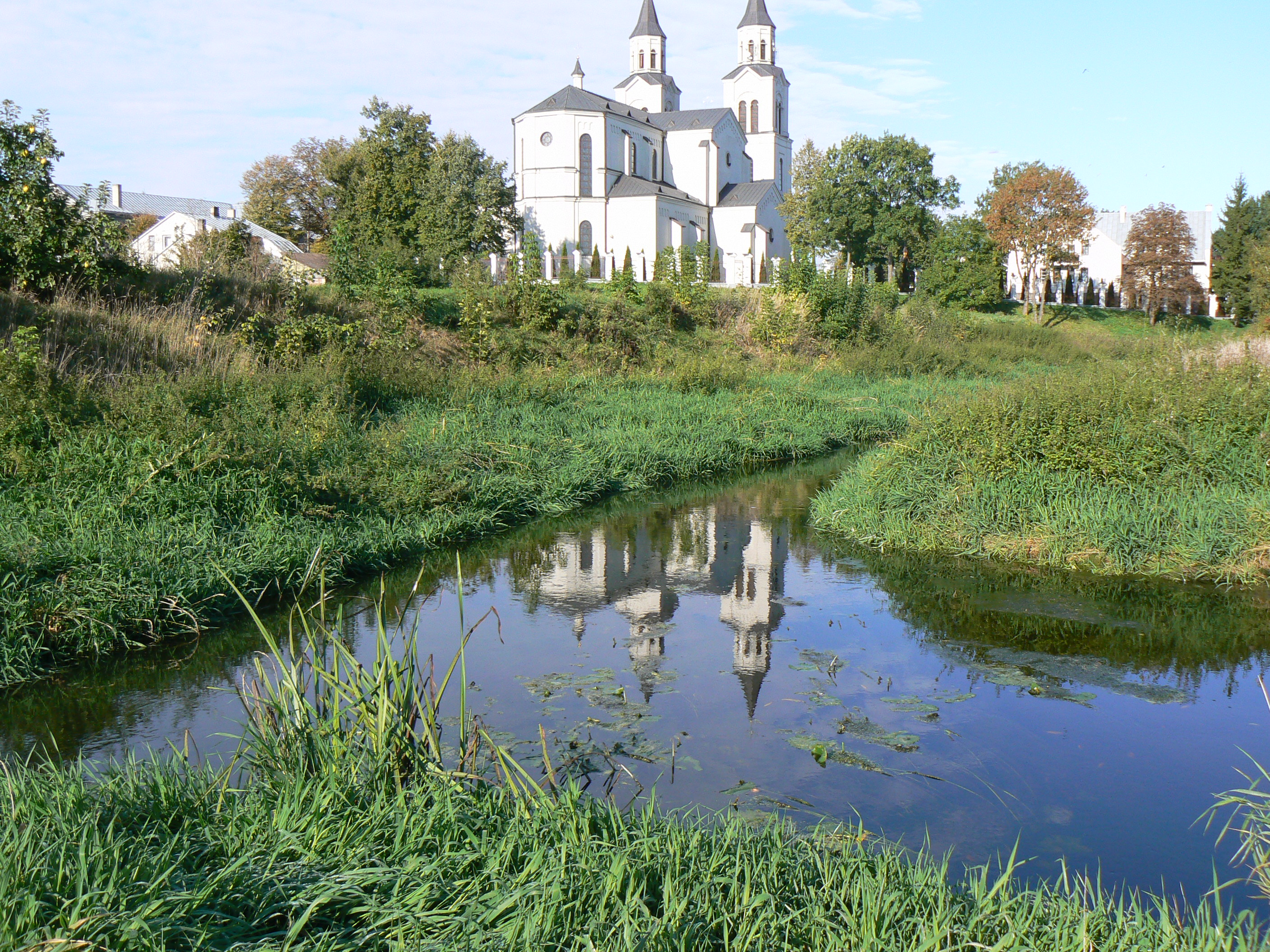
- Greenery near the Vilkaviškis Cathedral Vilkaviškis Train Station Church of the Holy Cross Clergy house of the Vilkaviškis Cathedral Vilkaviškis District Municipal Public Library Vilkaviškis District Municipality Headquarters Confluence of Vilkauja (right) and Šeimena (left) rivers

- Flag Coat of arms

- Location of Vilkaviškis
- Coordinates: 54°39′0″N 23°02′0″E
- Country: Lithuania
- Ethnographic region: Suvalkija
- County: Marijampolė County
- Municipality: Vilkaviškis district municipality
- Eldership: Vilkaviškis city eldership
- Capital of: Vilkaviškis district municipality Vilkaviškis city eldership Šeimena eldership
- First mentioned: 1561
- Granted city rights: 1660

Population (2025)
  - Total: 12,645
- Time zone: UTC+2 (EET)
  - Summer (DST): UTC+3 (EEST)
- Website: Vilkaviskis.lt

Vilkaviškis is a city in southwestern Lithuania, the administrative center of the Vilkaviškis District Municipality. It is located 23 km (14 mi) northwest from Marijampolė, at the confluence of Šeimena and Vilkauja rivers.

The city got its name from the Vilkauja River. Initially named Vilkaujiškis, the name was later changed to an easier-to-pronounce form, Vilkaviškis.

Until 1941, the city had a large Jewish community, which was killed by the German military and their local collaborators.

This is the city from which the 2016 cost-of-living Cauliflower Revolution originated.

It is the capital of Vilkaviškis District Municipality, Vilkaviškis city eldership, and Šeimena eldership.

== Names ==
The names of the city as it is called or was formerly called in other languages spoken by non-Lithuanian ethnic groups which have lived or live in or around the town include: Polish: Wyłkowyszki; Yiddish: װילקאָװישק, romanized: Vilkovishk; German: Wilkowischken. Other spelling variants include Vilkavishkis and Wilkowyszki.

== History ==
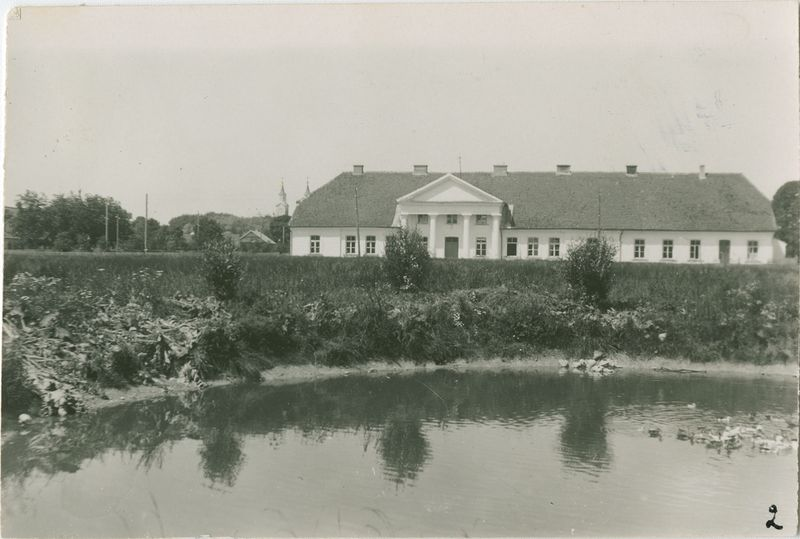
Early 20th-century view of the Vilkaviškis Manor, place of stay of Napoleon in 1812

The city was granted city rights in 1660 by the King of Poland and Grand Duke of Lithuania, John II Casimir Vasa. The coat of arms was granted by King Augustus II the Strong in 1697. It was most likely borrowed from the Pac family, as the owner of the village at the time, Krzysztof Zygmunt Pac, was also the Chancellor of Lithuania.

During the Kościuszko Uprising, in 1794, it was the site of a battle between Polish insurgents and Prussian troops. It remained in the Polish–Lithuanian Commonwealth until 1795 when, in the Third Partition of Poland, it was annexed by Prussia. In 1807, the city was incorporated into the short-lived Polish Duchy of Warsaw. On 19–23 June 1812, Napoleon Bonaparte stayed in the city. After the duchy's dissolution in 1815, the city became part of Russian-controlled Congress Poland, as part of the Augustów Voivodeship, and later Suwałki Governorate. In 1856, the vast majority of the city's population was Jewish, with 4,417 Jews and 834 Christians. During the January Uprising, on October 30, 1863, it was the site of a skirmish between Polish insurgents and Russian troops.

During World War I, the city was captured by German forces and held until 1918, when the place became part of independent Lithuania. An American-Lithuanian wrote of his observations when returning to the city in 1919:

I saw that Lithuania is more devastated than Belgium. The Germans crossed through Belgium once only, while Lithuania had been the regular battlefield for the German and Russian armies. It was alternately captured and recaptured by the contending armies. When the Russian army was fleeing it destroyed whatever opportunity afforded, likewise the German army in its retreat carried everything in its wake, pillaged, burned and destroyed whatever it could not take. I noticed in particular one village which had been, only a few trees were visible. Numerous farm houses had been destroyed and burned to the ground. People now live in huts made partly of straw, old boards and clay. Not only the war, but nature has made changes in Lithuania. Rivers, such as the Šeimena and Širvinta, are only brooks. As we approached Vilkaviškis, my native city, the passengers called my attention to the station. My imagination failed to picture the rudely constructed hut as the same station of former years, which had been entirely destroyed by the invading army.

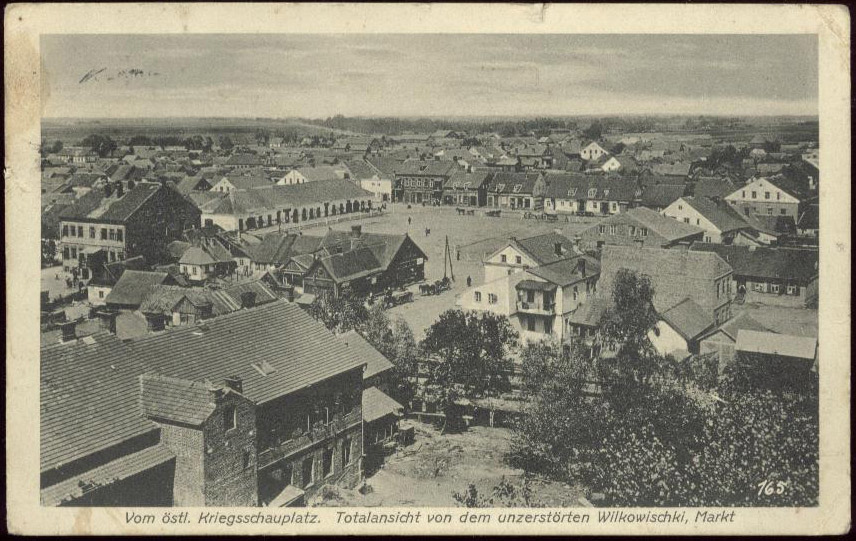
City centre in 1916

During the interwar period, a rail line was constructed running through nearby Marijampolė, which caused that town to become the regional centre, replacing Vilkaviškis in its traditional role. In 1926, the Roman Catholic Diocese of Vilkaviškis was established and its curia was located in the Vilkaviškis Manor. Since 1926, the Vilkaviškis Priest Seminary was operating in the city.

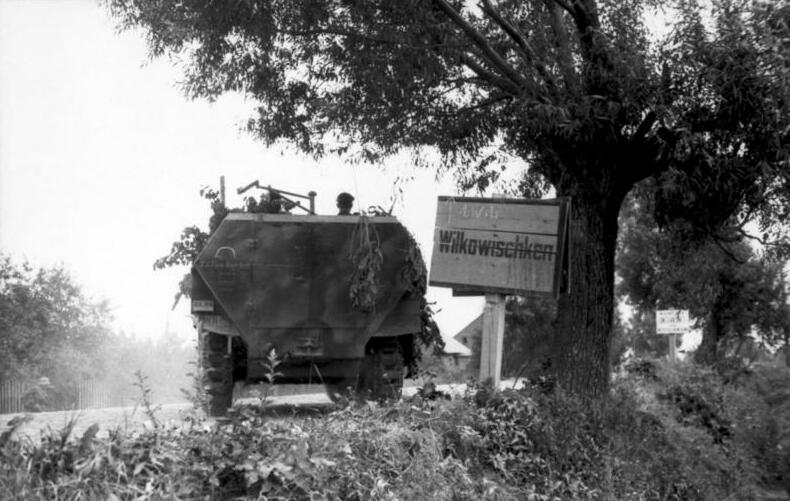
German units in the city during World War II

Shortly after the outbreak of World War II, the control of the area fell to the Soviets, between 1940 and 1941, on the basis of the Molotov–Ribbentrop pact. In 1941, Nazi Germany attacked the Soviet Union, invaded Lithuania, and occupied the city. Between June and September 1941, the Germans, along with Lithuanian collaborators, destroyed almost all the houses in the city and murdered more than 3,000 people, most of them Jews. Many of the males were shot on 28 July, and the women and children following on the Fast of Gedalia on 24 September. In March 1942, several Polish priests were imprisoned in the local seminary by the Germans, and then eventually deported to other camps in December 1942 (see Nazi persecution of the Catholic Church in Poland).

The city was the scene of a successful counter-attack by the German Panzer-Grenadier-Division Großdeutschland in the autumn of 1944, and the aftermath of the fighting was the scene of several propaganda photographs in which the name of the city was prominently featured. The city was captured by the Red Army in August 1944. After the war, it was part of the Lithuanian SSR within the Soviet Union.

When Lithuania regained its independence in 1991, the city became the capital of the newly established Vilkaviškis district municipality. The Vilkaviškis Priest Seminary was restored by the Bishop Juozas Žemaitis in 1999 and operated until 2005, when its clerics were transferred to the Kaunas Priest Seminary. In the late 20th century, the Curia of the Roman Catholic Diocese of Vilkaviškis was moved to Marijampolė.

In 2020, Vilkaviškis won the Lithuania Village Flower Show, as voted by the board of Pakruojis Manor.

== Notable people ==
The town and the surrounding district.

- Aharon April (1932–2020), a distinguished Israeli artist and sculptor.
- Jonas Basanavičius (1851–1927), an activist of the Lithuanian National Revival.
- Sonia Gaskell (1904–1974), dancer and choreographer.
- Leon Kamaiky (1864–1928), American newspaper owner and publisher.
- Vincas Kudirka (1858–1899), author of the Lithuanian National Anthem (born in nearby Paežeriai).
- Marian Lalewicz (1876–1944), Polish architect.
- Julius Bučas (1893–1932), physician and surgeon, head of the Vilkaviškis county hospital.
- Miriam Markel-Mosessohn (1839–1920), Hebrew writer and translator.
- Galina Shurepova (1939–2017), the first female diver in the Soviet navy, trainer of military dolphins.
- Jacques Mering (1904–1973), a research engineer, in the fields of clay mineralogy and clay science, in graphite studies, and in the applications of X-ray diffraction and electron-optical methods to these.
