= Süsskind Raschkow =

Süsskind Raschkow (also Süskind, died in Breslau, 12 April 1836) was a German Jewish poet writing in Hebrew. He was the author of Yosef v'Asenat ("Joseph and Osnat"), a drama (1817); Hayye Shimshon ("The life of Samson") an epic poem (1824); and Tal Yaldut ("The dew of Youth") a collection of poems and proverbs (1835).

== See also ==
- Lelio Della Torre
