= Ben-Zeev =

Ben-Zeev (Hebrew: בן זאב) may refer to:

- Aaron Ben-Ze'ev (born 1949), Israeli philosopher and President of the University of Haifa
- Judah Leib Ben-Ze'ev (1764–1811), Galician Jewish grammarian
- Moshe Ben-Ze'ev (1911–1995), Israeli jurist and Attorney General of Israel from 1963 to 1968
- Noam Ben-Zeev (born 1954), Israeli music critic and journalist
- Yoram Ben-Zeev (born 1944), Israeli diplomat

== See also ==
- Ezekiel Feivel ben Ze'ev Wolf
- Israel ben Ze'ev Wolf Salanter
- Jacob ben Ze'ev Wolf Kranz
