= Micah Joseph Lebensohn =

Litvak writer (1828–1852)

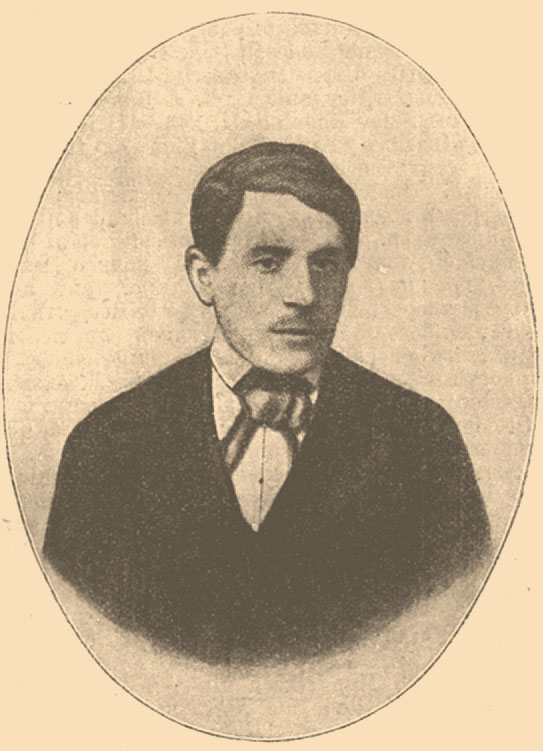
- Born: 2 February 1828; Vilna, Russian Empire
- Died: 17 February 1852 (aged 24); Vilna, Russian Empire
- Occupations: Poet; translator
- Relatives: Avraham Dov Ber Lebensohn (father); Joshua Steinberg (brother-in-law)
- Writing career
- Pen name: Mikhal
- Language: Hebrew
- Literary movement: Haskalah, Romanticism

Micah Joseph Lebensohn (Hebrew: מיכה יוסף הכהן לעבענזאָהן, romanized: Mikhah Yosef ha-Kohen Lebenzohn; (2 February 1828 – 17 February 1852), also known by the pen name Mikhal (מיכ״ל), was one of the foremost poets and translators of the Haskalah in Vilna. He is best known for his innovative narrative Biblical romances and pantheistic nature poetry, influenced by the Romantic movement. These are characterised by "a deep pathos and a beauty of expression," and noted for their "expression of the young poet's strong longing for life and of the dread of an early dissolution which preyed on his mind."

== Biography ==
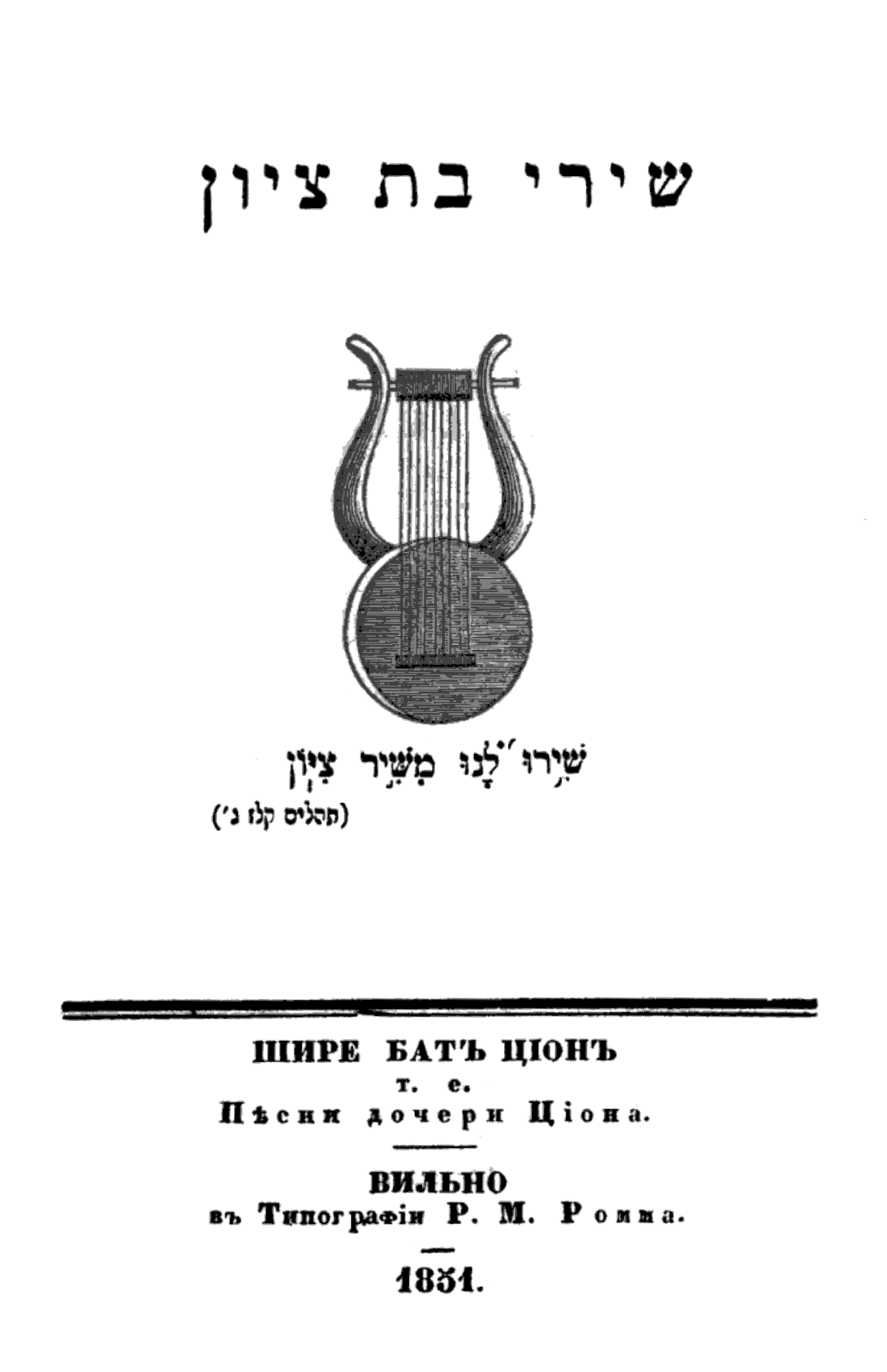
Title page of Shirei Bat-Tsiyyon (1851)

Micha Joseph Lebensohn was born on 2 February 1828 in Vilna, the son of maskilic poet Avraham Dov Ber Lebensohn (Adam ha-Kohen), where he received a thorough Jewish education. Having met in his father's house many prominent Jewish writers, he developed an early interest in literature. He began to translate poetry into Hebrew at the age of twelve, and at the age of sixteen composed his first original poem, Ha-Aḥvah ('Fraternity'), written to his brother Noah. As a teenager, Lebensohn, besides his perfect command of Hebrew, was privately tutored in Russian, French, Polish and German.

By the late 1840s, Lebensohn discovered early symptoms of tuberculosis. In 1849, on the advice of his doctor, he went to sanatoria abroad for medical treatment. During a winter in Berlin, he attended the philosophy lectures of Schelling at the University of Berlin, and came under the influence of German Romanticism. At the same time, he became closely acquainted with scholars Shneur Sachs and Leopold Zunz, who encouraged him to write original poetry on Jewish and Biblical heroes. He also visited the spa towns of Salzbrunn and Reinerz to seek relief from the disease.

He returned to Vilna in 1850, where he lived until his death shortly after his twenty-fourth birthday, on 17 February 1852. His last poem, Ha-tefilah ('Prayer'), is dedicated to 'Prayer, Daughter of Hearts'.

== Literary career ==
In 1847, Lebensohn wrote a translation into Hebrew of the third and fourth books of Virgil's Æneid (after Schiller's German translation), under the title Harisut Troya ('The Destruction of Troy'). The following year he wrote translations of Alfieri's Saul (as Aḥarit Sha’ul) and Goethe's Erlkönig (as Melekh balahot), among other works. Other compositions of this period include translations of Arnault's La feuille (as Daliyyah niddaḥat) and Mickiewicz's Farys (as Ha-Aravi ba-midbar), as well as elegies on the death of M. A. Günzburg.

While in Berlin, Lebensohn wrote a cycle of lyric poems, including Ahuva azuva ('Sorrowful Lover'), Yom huledet ahuvati ('My Beloved's Birthday'), Aḥot lanu ('A Sister to Us'), and Ḥag ha-aviv ('The Festival of Spring').

Lebensohn wrote his best known work, the poetry collection Shirei Bat-Tsiyyon ('Songs of a Daughter of Zion', published 1851, second edition 1869), in 1850. It consists of six epic poems on Jewish subjects with naturalistic description: Shelomo ('Solomon'), Kohelet ('Ecclesiastes'), Nikmat Shimshon ('Samson's Vengeance'), Yael ve-Sisra ('Jael and Sisera'), Moshe al Har ha-Avarim ('Moses on Mount Abarim'), and Yehuda ha-Levi ('Judah Halevi'). The best known among them, Shelomo and Kohelet, contrast the optimism of a young King Solomon with the disillusionment of the monarch in his old age.

In the Jewish Encyclopedia (1904), Herman Rosenthal and Peter Wiernik wrote that

"Lebensohn's poetry surpasses that of his father, and is characterized by a deep pathos and a beauty of expression which are rare in Neo-Hebrew verse. It is also noted for its expression of the young poet's strong longing for life and of the dread of an early dissolution which preyed on his mind."

== Legacy ==
After his death, a second volume of Lebensohn's poetry entitled Kinor Bat-Tsiyyon ('Violin of a Daughter of Zion', published in 1870) was assembled by his father. It contains, alongside a number of pieces translated from German, lyric poems, love poetry, and lamentations for the Land of Israel.

Lebensohn's brother-in-law, Joshua Steinberg, published a German translation of Shirei Bat-Tsiyyon entitled Gesänge Zion's in 1859. The poems Shelomo and Kohelet were published in French translation, and Yehuda ha-Levi in Russian. In 1895, a six-volume collection of his poems and those of his father appeared under the title Kol shire Ada"m u-Mikh"al.

Lebensohn's work had a strong influence on J. L. Gordon, his contemporary and friend, and other lyric poets of the next generation. A noted elegy entitled Mikhal Dim'ah (in the second part of Shirei Sefat Kodesh) on his death was written by his father. J. L. Gordon's wrote an allegorical drama, Ho Aḥ ('O, Brother'), which is placed in the first part of Kol Shiray Yehudah, and Samuel David Luzzatto penned a kinah in Lebenson's honor. Gordon also published the kinah Ofel Bat-Tsiyyon in Lebensohn's memory in 1877.

== Published works ==
- Vergil ha-Romi (1869) [1849]. Harisut Troya [The Destruction of Troy] (in Hebrew). Vilna: Romm Publishing House. hdl:2027/hvd.hwmsm3.
- Shirei Bat-Tsiyyon [Songs of a Daughter of Zion] (in Hebrew). Vilna: Gedruckt bey Rubin Manes Romm. 1851.
- Kinor Bat-Tsiyyon [Violin of a Daughter of Zion] (in Hebrew). Vilna: Romm Publishing House. 1870. hdl:2027/uc1.a0000811828.
- Kol shire Ada"m u-Mikh"al [The Complete Poetry of Adam and Mikhal] (in Hebrew). Vilna: Romm Publishing House. 1895. hdl:2027/uc1.a0001239680.
