= Judah Leib Gordon =

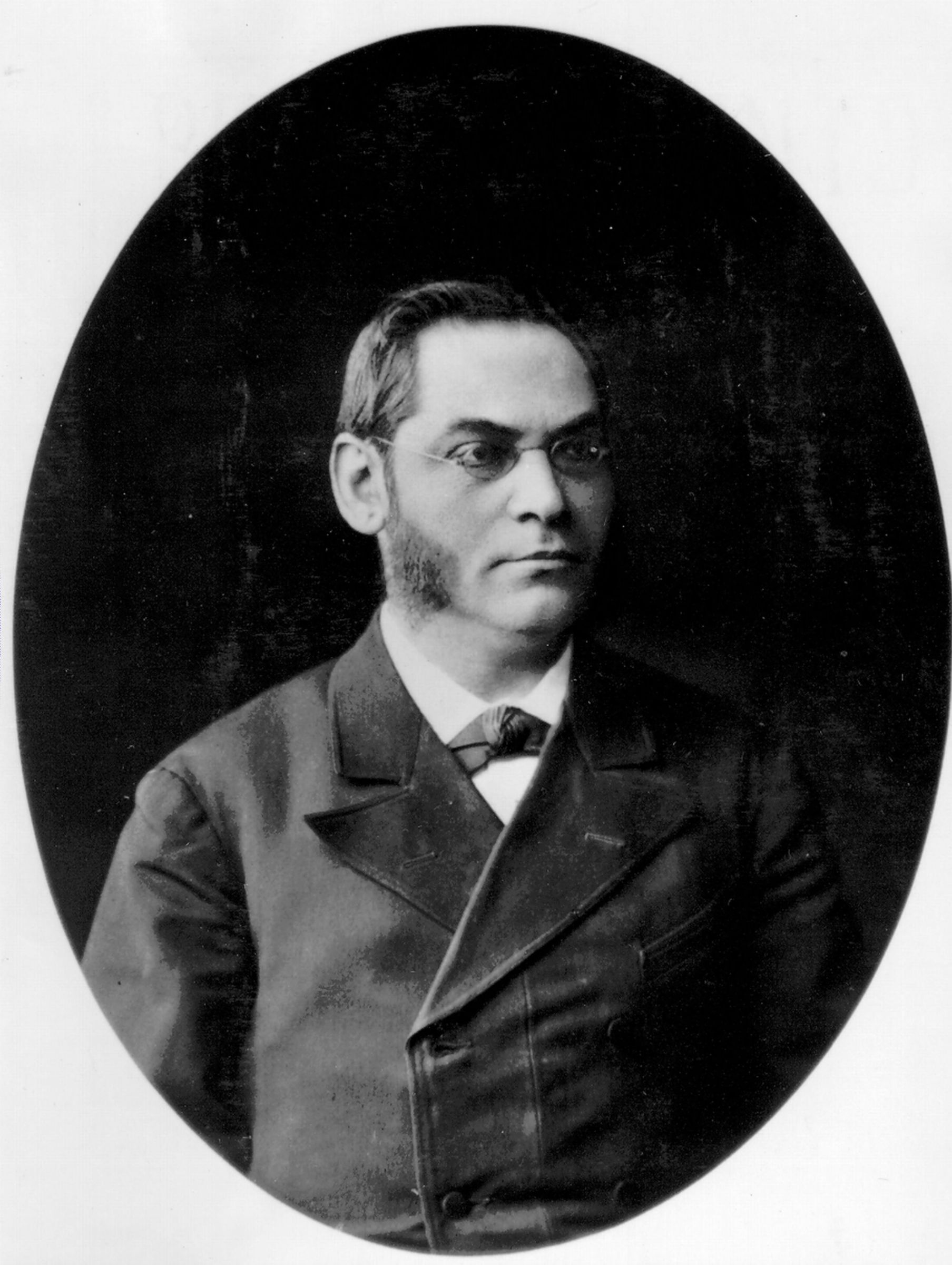
- Born: December 7, 1830; Vilna, Russian Empire
- Died: September 16, 1892 (aged 61); St. Petersburg, Russian Empire
- Relatives: Mikhl Gordon (brother-in-law)

Judah Leib Gordon (Hebrew: יהודה לייב גורדון, romanized: Yehuda Leyb Gordon, Yiddish: יהודה לייב גאָרדאָן; December 7, 1830 – September 16, 1892), also known as Leon Gordon, was among the most important Hebrew poets of the Haskalah.

== Biography ==
Gordon was born to well-to-do Jewish parents who owned a hotel in Vilnius. As a privileged child, he was able to study Torah with some of the great educators of the city, and soon proved to be an exceptional student. He had already mastered the entire Bible by the age of eleven, and was fluent in hundreds of pages of Talmud. Matters took a sharp turn when Gordon was fourteen, and his father went bankrupt.

Unable to finance his son's education any longer, the younger Gordon began a course of independent study at one of the many study halls in the city. In just three years, he had mastered almost the entire Talmud and dozens of other religious texts. By that time, however, he was also drawn by the spirit of the Enlightenment that was sweeping across the city.

He began reading secular literature and learning foreign languages, and he befriended some of the leading Haskalah figures of the time, including Kalman Schulman, the poet Abraham Dob Bär Lebensohn and his son Micah Joseph Lebensohn.

With the financial situation deteriorating at home, Gordon, then twenty-two, decided it was time for him to pursue a career. He received a teaching certificate from the local rabbinical college, and became a school teacher in some of the smaller towns that housed major yeshivas, including Ponivezh and Telz. During the twenty years he spent as a teacher, he produced his most important work as a poet and author.

In late 1871, he was invited by the Jewish community of Saint Petersburg to serve as secretary of both the community and the Society for the Spread of Enlightenment among the Jews of Russia; after several months of negotiations, he accepted the dual position for a three-month trial period, beginning in June 1872.

Welcoming the move to the cosmopolitan Russian capital, and finding his activities on behalf of the community and the society well suited to his aspirations to contribute to the modernization of Jewish life, he quickly made himself indispensable in his post, and the community offered him a permanent contract, which he accepted.

He continued in this position continuously for nearly seven years. In May 1879 he was arrested for purported anti-czarist activities, and exiled for some months to Pudozh, in the Olonets district, before finally being cleared of the charges in 1880; it was a blow to him that the Saint Petersburg community chose not to reinstate him in his post upon his return.

That same year Gordon became an editor for the Hebrew newspaper Ha-Melitz; and, despite frequent conflict with the newspaper's founder and editor-in-chief, Aleksander Zederbaum, he continued in that capacity until 1888.

== Literary work ==
Gordon took a leading part in the modern revival of the Hebrew language and culture. His satires did much to rouse the Russian Jews to a new sense of the reality of life, and Gordon was the apostle of enlightenment in the ghettos.

Much of his poetry revolves around biblical and historical themes. These include The Love of David and Michal (1857), King Zedekiah in Prison (1879), Judah's Parables (1859), David and Barzilai, Osenath, Daughter of Potiphera, From between the Lion's Teeth, and From the Depths of the Sea.

His works were intended to disseminate Enlightenment values and had a profound impact on Jewish life. Gordon also published collections of fables, most of them translated. In works such as "Little Fables for Big Children", he continues to advocate for the adoption of Enlightenment values, as he does in his memoirs, published in the last year of his life.

Among his other writing on social issues is "The Point on Top of the Yodh" (Kotzo shel yud), dealing with the rights of women. The poem, which he dedicated to his friend the Hebraist Miriam Markel-Mosessohn, describes a narrow-minded rabbi who destroys a woman's chance for happiness by invalidating her get (divorce document) – due to a trifling spelling mistake.

His poems were collected in four volumes, Kol Shire Yehudah (St. Petersburg, 1883–1884); his novels in Kol Kitbe Yehuda (Collected Writings of Gordon, Odessa, 1889).
