= Shmuel-Bukh =

Yiddish midrashic verse epic

The Shmuel-Bukh is a midrashic verse epic written in Yiddish. Composed no later than the second half of the 15th century and widely circulated in manuscript, it was first printed in Augsburg in 1544. Its stanzaic form resembles that of the Nibelungenlied, and its hero is the biblical David. Sol Liptzin characterizes it as the greatest Old Yiddish religious epic. [Liptzin, 1972, 8–9].

Following the example of other European epics, the poem was not simply recited, but sung or chanted to musical accompaniment. Its melody was widely known in Jewish communities. As was the case with other early Yiddish adaptations of biblical narrative, it fuses biblical material, Midrashic legends and rabbinical commentary with medieval traditions of European heroic poetry, thus creating what some romantic scholars deemed an Ashkenazic 'national epic,' comparable to the German 'national epic,' the Nibelungenlied, the French 'national epic,' The Song of Roland, or the English 'national epic,' Beowulf.

Its authorship is a matter of controversy. The next to last stanza of one surviving manuscript says that it was "made" by Moshe Esrim Vearba. No one can be sure whether this "maker" is the author or a copyist, and Esrim Vearba is Hebrew for 24, the number of books of the Hebrew Bible, so the name is almost certainly a pseudonym. Zalman Shazar (president of Israel 1963–1973) believed that it was written by an Ashekenazi rabbi active in Constantinople (now Istanbul) in the second half of the 15th century. [Liptzin, 1972, 8-9]

The work draws on the Hebrew Bible, the midrashic tradition, and Middle High German heroic tales. [Liptzin, 1972, 9]
