= Avraham Dov Ber Lebensohn =

Lithuanian Jewish Hebraist

Abraham Dov Ber Lebensohn
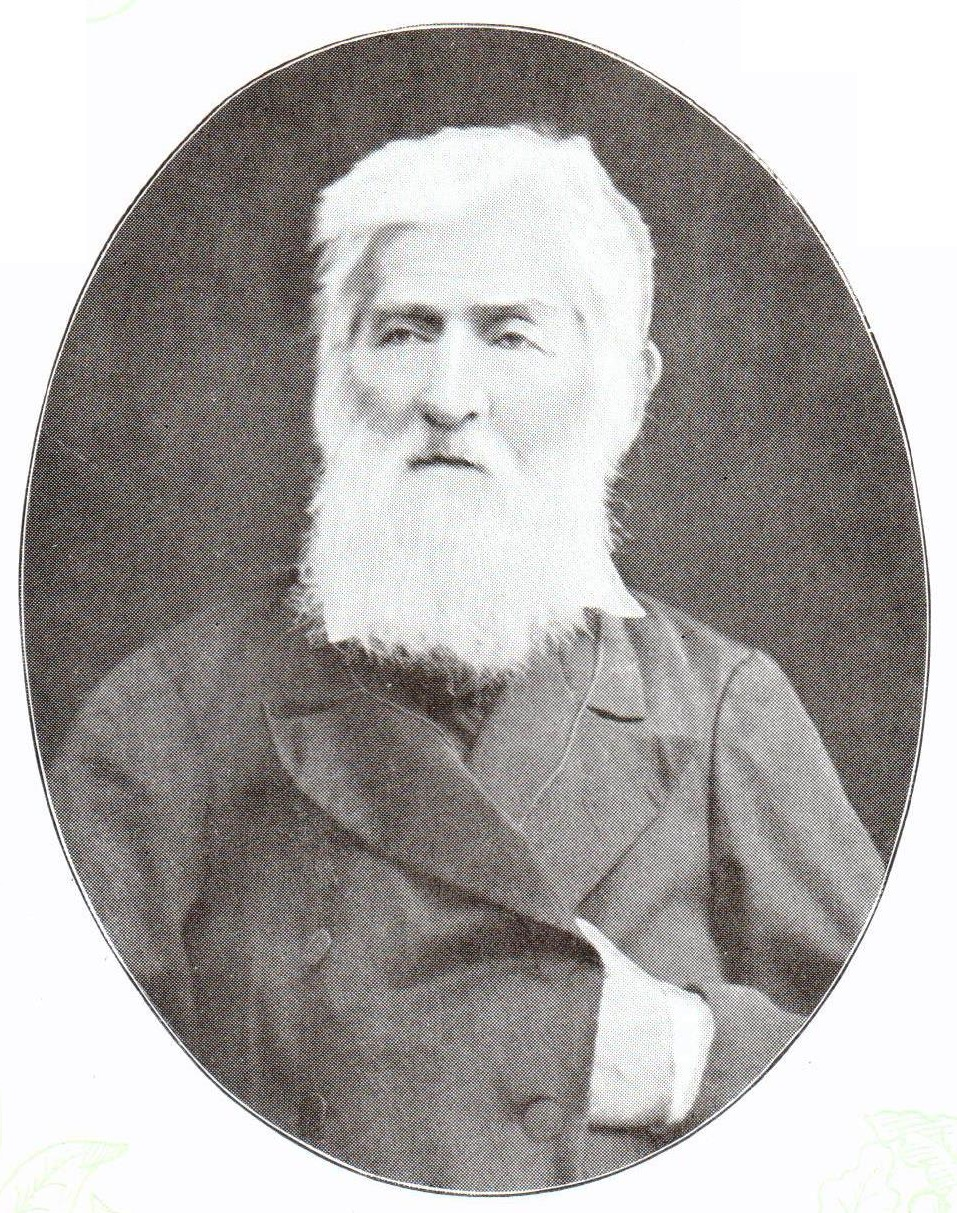
- Born: c. 1789–1794
- Died: November 19, 1878
- Children: Micah Joseph Lebensohn
- Writing career
- Pen name: Abraham Dov-Ber Michailishker, Adam, Adam ha-Kohen

Abraham Dov Ber Lebensohn (Yiddish: אברהם דב-בער לעבענזאָהן; c. 1789/1794 – November 19, 1878), also known by the pen names Abraham Dov-Ber Michailishker (אברהם דב-בער מיכלישוקר) and Adam ha-Kohen (אד״ם הכהן), was a Lithuanian Jewish Hebraist, poet and educator.

== Biography ==
Avraham Dov Ber Lebenson was born in Katloŭka about Vilna. He became interested in Hebrew grammar and punctuation when studying the weekly portions of the Law for his bar-mitzvah. He was married, according to the custom of those times, right after his bar mitzvah and he spent the next eight years with his wife's parents in Michališki. This gave him the surname "Michailishker," which accounts for the last letter of his pen-name "Adam" (formed from the initials of Abraham Dob Michailishker). The family name "Lebensohn," which he adopted, is a literal translation of "ben Ḥayyim." He lived for four years in Oshmiany, where he attempted to establish himself as a merchant. He was an accomplished rabbinic scholar, but devoted most of his leisure time to the study of Hebrew poetical and grammatical works. On returning to his native city, where he remained for the rest of his life, he was a broker and teacher.

He had two sons, the Hebrew poet Micah Joseph Lebensohn (aka Michal), and Aryeh Löb Lebensohn, a prominent businessman in Vilna.

== Literary career ==
His first poetical work to be published was the Shir Ḥavivim (Vilnius, 1822), in honor of the marriage of Count Tyszkiewicz, one of the most powerful noblemen of Lithuania. It was followed by Evel Kaved (ib. 1825), an elegy on the death of Saul Katzenellenbogen, which established his reputation as a Hebrew poet. In 1828, he published his book Teudah beyisra’el (A Testimony in Israel), a work that became the springboard for the formation of the Haskalah movement in Russia.

The publication of the first volume of his poetry, entitled Shiray Sefat Ḳodesh (Leipzig, 1842; 2d ed. Vilnius, 1863), marks the beginning of a new epoch in Hebrew literature in Lithuania. It was received with enthusiasm. Thousands of followers of the Haskalah movement learned his poems by heart and his fame spread to all centers of Hebrew learning.

When Sir Moses Montefiore visited Vilnius in 1846, Lebensohn prepared an article on the condition of the Jews in Russia and the means by which it was to be improved. This interesting document, embodying the views held by the Maskilim of that period, summarized the evils from which the Jews suffered and stated that they were to blame for their troubles. Lack of education and of skill in handicrafts, too early marriages, the ignorance of the rabbis and teachers, and extravagance were described as the four avot neziḳin or chief faults; and relief was proposed, as was customary in those times, through governmental intervention.

== Rabbinic commentary ==
In 1848, Lebensohn became one of the principal teachers in the newly established rabbinical school of Vilna, a position which he filled for nearly twenty years, until he was forced by age and impaired eyesight to relinquish it. He was succeeded by his son-in-law Joshua Steinberg. Also in 1848, he began, conjointly with the bibliographer Benjacob, the publication of a new edition of the Bible, with a German translation, himself adding valuable glosses to the bi'ur (Miḳra'e Ḳodesh, Vilna, 1848–53). Some of his commentaries on the Bible were later printed separately as a supplement to that edition (Bi'urim Ḥadashim, ib. 1858). A second volume of Shiray Sefat Ḳodesh appeared in Vilna in 1856 (2d ed., ib. 1869); and in 1869 was published Yeter Shiray Adam the third volume of the same work, containing also poems written by his son Micah Joseph Lebensohn.

The most important of his later works are the allegorical drama Emet ve-Emunah (ib. 1867; 2d ed., ib. 1870), on the harmony of science and religion; and Yitron le-Adam (ib. 1874), a commentary on Ben-Ze'ev's Hebrew grammar, Talmud Leshon 'Ivri with which it has been often reprinted. A new edition of the three volumes of Shiray Sefat Ḳodesh appeared in Vilna in 1895.

Lebensohn was recognized in his later years as a pioneer of the Haskalah in northwestern Russia. The Maskilim of Vilna considered themselves as his pupils, while the traditionalist religious saw in him the embodiment of all the objectionable features of the Haskalah movement.

== See also ==
- Hebrew literature
