= Max Wickert =

American poet

- Born: Maxalbrecht Wickert; May 26, 1938 (age 88); Augsburg, Germany

Academic background
- Education: St. Bonaventure University (BA); Yale University (PhD)

Academic work
- Discipline: English Literature; Poetry
- Institutions: Nazareth College (1962–1965); University at Buffalo (since 1966)

Max Wickert (born May 26, 1938, Augsburg, Germany) is a German-American teacher, poet, translator and publisher. He is Professor of English Emeritus at the University at Buffalo.

== Early life and education ==
Max Wickert was born Maxalbrecht Wickert in Augsburg, Germany, the oldest child of Stephan Phillip Wickert, an artist and art teacher (later industrial designer), and Thilde (Kellner) Wickert. Four younger children, all sisters, were born between 1940 and 1946. In 1943, he was evacuated to Langenneufnach, a small farming village after the Augsburg raid. He received his early education in Langenneufnach, Passau, and Augsburg. In 1952, his family immigrated to Rochester, New York, where he completed high school at the Aquinas Institute.

After receiving his Bachelor of Arts degree from St. Bonaventure University and completed graduate work in English at Yale University on a Woodrow Wilson Fellowship, studying under Cleanth Brooks, E. Talbot Donaldson, Davis P. Harding, Frederick W. Hilles, John C. Pope, Eugene Waith, W.K. Wimsatt, and Alexander Witherspoon. He completed a dissertation on William Morris under the direction of William Clyde DeVane and received his Ph.D. in 1965. At Yale, while working as a reader for Penny Poems under Al Shavzin and Don Mull, he began writing poetry and briefly met Gregory Corso and Amiri Baraka (then Leroi Jones).

== Career ==
His first teaching appointment was at Nazareth College in Rochester, New York (1962–1965).

Upon arrival in Buffalo, Max Wickert formed close friendships with a number of writers who were then students or fellow teachers, including Dan Murray, Shreela Ray, Robert Hass and

John Logan. Other significant colleagues at Buffalo were poets Robert Creeley, Irving Feldman, Mac Hammond and Bill Sylvester; novelists John Barth, J. M. Coetzee (his office mate for a year), and Carlene Polite; and critics Albert Spaulding Cook, Leslie Fiedler, Lionel Abel, and Dwight Macdonald.

For the English department, he has served as director of undergraduate studies and as chair of the Charles D. Abbott Poetry Readings Committee. He also helped to establish and frequently judged the university's annual Academy of American Poets Student Poetry Prize Competition. With Dan Murray and Doug Eichhorn, he founded the Outriders Poetry Project in 1968 and has been its director ever since. (Outriders, originally a sponsor of poetry readings in Buffalo bistros, became a small press in 2009.)

Between 1968 and 1972, he published verse translations from the Austrian expressionist Georg Trakl, and from various German poets. In collaboration with Hubert Kulterer, he also translated 1001 Ways to Live Without Working, by the American Beat poet Tuli Kupferberg, into German.

During the early 1970s, he wrote essays on early opera and briefly worked as a radio station host for WBFO's "The World of Opera." His short story, The Scythe of Saturn was a prize-winner in the 1983 Stand Magazine (Newcastle upon Tyne) Fiction Competition. Over the years, over 100 of Max Wickert’s poems and translation have appeared in journals, including American Poetry Review, Chicago Review, Choice: A Magazine of Poetry and Photography, The Lyric, Malahat Review, Michigan Review, Pequod, Poetry (magazine), Chicago Review, Sewanee Review, Shenandoah (magazine) and Xanadu, as well as in several anthologies.

As a scholar, Max Wickert produced a handful of articles and conference papers on Spenser, Shakespeare and early opera, but was principally known as a teacher of a lower-division course on Dante’s Divine Comedy and of an Intensive Survey of English Literature, a seminar of his own design for specially motivated majors. Among his students were Neil Baldwin, Michael Basinski, Charles Baxter, and Patricia Gill.

In 1985, he received an NEH Summer Fellowship to the Dartmouth Dante Institute, and for several summers thereafter pursued intensive study of Italian at the Università per Stranieri in Perugia, Italy. He has since turned increasingly to translation from Italian. He published The Liberation of Jerusalem, a verse translation of Torquato Tasso’s epic, Gerusalemme liberata, in 2008, and a year later completed translations of a medieval prose romance, Andrea da Barberino’s Reali di Francia (The Royal House of France) and of Università per Stranieri (University for Aliens) by the contemporary Italian poet, Daniela Margheriti. His edition and verse translation of Tasso's early love poems (Love Poems for Lucrezia Bendidio) appeared in 2011, followed in 2017 by his version of Tasso’s first epic, Rinaldo, both published by Italica Press.

== Personal life ==
As a professor at Nazareth College, Wickert married one of his students. The marriage ended in divorce in 1969. A daughter, now a psychologist working in Massachusetts, was born in 1965. He remarried in 2006, and lives with his wife Katka Hammond in downtown Buffalo. His youngest sister, Gabriele Wickert, a college professor of German literature, taught at Manhattanville College until her retirement in 2019.

== Published books ==
- All the Weight of the Still Midnight (Buffalo, NY: Outriders Poetry Project, 1972; poems)
- Pat Sonnets (Sound Beach, NY: Street Press, 2000; poems)
- The Liberation of Jerusalem ([[]]: Oxford World’s Classics, 2008; verse translation of Torquato Tasso’s Gerusalemme liberata)
- (with Hubert Kulterer), 1001 Wege ohne Arbeit zu leben (Vienna [Austria]: Eröffnungen, 1972) and Wenzendorf [Germany]: Stadtlichter Presse, 2009, 2nd. ed. 2015; translation of Tuli Kupferberg’s 1001 Ways to Live Without Working
- No Cartoons (Buffalo, NY: Outriders Poetry Project, 2011; poems)
- Love Poems for Lucrezia Bendidio (New York, NY: Italica Press, 2011; edition and verse translation from Torquato Tasso's Rime d'Amore)
- Rinaldo by Torquato Tasso (New York, NY: Italica Press, 2017; A New English Verse Translation with Facing Italian Text, Critical Introduction and Notes)

== Selected publications ==
=== Articles ===
- "Structure and Ceremony in Spenser’s ‘Epithalamion'", ELH: A Journal of English Literary History, XXXV:2 (June, 1968), 135-5.
- "Karl Mickel: A Voice from East Germany", Books Abroad, XLIII:2 (Spring, 1969), 211-12.
- "Librettos and Academies: Some Speculations and an Example", Opera Journal, VII:4 (1974), 6-16.
- "Bellini’s Orpheus", Opera Journal, IX:4 (1976), 11-18.
- "Orpheus Dismembered: Operatic Myth Goes Underground", Salmagundi (magazine), XXVIII/XXXIX (Summer/Fall, 1977), 118-136.
- "Che Farò Senza Euridyce: Myth and Meaning in Early Opera", Opera Journal, XI: 1 (1978), 18-35.

=== Verse and fiction (selection) ===
- "Dawn Scene", Choice: A Magazine of Poetry and Photography, #6 (1970), p. 46.
- "Three Poems", Descant, XIV (Winter, 1970), pp. 13–15.
- "Warning", "For Esther", "He is the Mother" and "The Months", Michigan Quarterly Review, X:3 (Summer, 1971), pp. 195–99.
- "Nocturne" and "Aubade", Poetry (magazine), CXIX:4 (January, 1972), pp. 218–19.
- "Two Polemics of Departure", Choice: A Magazine of Poetry and Photography, #7/8 (1972), pp. 310–11.
- "Is This Typical?" Street, II:2 (1976), p. 58.
- "Born Lucky", American Poetry Review VIIL:4 (July/August, 1978), p. 22.
- "Goodbye" and "More Slowly", Choice: A Magazine of Poetry and Photography, #10 (1978), pp. 256–7.
- from the "Pat Sonnets", Poetry (magazine), LXXXVII:1 (October, 1980), pp. 18–21.
- "Dawn Song", Pequod (Winter, 1980), p. 8.
- "A Little Satori Take", Berkeley Poetry Review, #13 (Spring, 1980), p. 22.
- "Parallax, Twenty-two-hundred Hours" and "Letters to Your Grandfather", Pacific Poetry and Fiction Review, VIII:2 (Fall, 1980), pp. 43, 58.
- "Slugabed", Xanadu, #8 (1982), p. 34.
- "Two Poems", Pembroke Magazine, #14 (1983), pp. 42–43.
- from the "Pat Sonnets", Poetry (magazine), CXL:1 (April,1982), pp. 8–11.
- "Two Poems", Shenandoah (magazine), XXXIII:2 (Winter, 1983), pp. 53–54.
- "Pastoral", The Lyric, LXIII:1 (Winter, 1983), p. 14.
- "Three Sonnets from The Unholy Weeks", Shenandoah (magazine), XXXV:1 (1983-4), pp. 52–53.
- "Parsifal", Sewanee Review, XCII:4 (Fall,1984), pp. 541–42.
- "The Scythe of Saturn" (fiction) in: Michael Blackburn, Jon Silkin and Lorna Tracy (ed.), Stand One (London: Victor Gollancz, 1984), pp. 93–115.

== Fellowships and awards ==
- Woodrow Wilson Fellowship, 1957–58
- NYS Research Foundation Grant-in-Aid, 1968 (for Trakl translations)
- Co-Winner, New Poets Prize, Chowan University, 1980
- Co-Winner, Albright-Knox Gallery, Buffalo, NY, Poets-on-Paintings Competition, 1982
- Co-Winner, Mason Sonnet Award, World Order of Narrative Poets, 1983
- Co-Winner, Burchfield Penney Art Center Poetry Competition, Buffalo, NY 1983
- Honorable Mention, Stand Short Story Competition, Newcastle upon Tyne, England, 1983
- NEH Summer Fellowship, Dartmouth Dante Institute, Summer 1986
