= Outriders Poetry Project =

Arts organization

Outriders Poetry Project is a privately funded organization operating in Buffalo, NY that sponsors readings and publishes books by poets and writers based in or associated with the greater Buffalo area. The project started in 1968.

== History ==
Outriders was founded in 1968 by Max Wickert (then assistant professor of English in the University at Buffalo), Dan Murray (a Buffalo M.A. candidate in Creative Writing) and Doug Eichhorn (then studying under Donald Justice at Syracuse University). Max Wickert has been its director since 1969. In the 1970s, Outriders, with support from the New York State Council on the Arts and Poets & Writers, Inc., ran a series of weekly poetry readings in Buffalo bars, typically involving a reading by a featured writer, followed by an open reading, in which celebrities visiting Buffalo often also participated. From 1978 to 1980, Outriders formed part of N.E.W. (Niagara-Erie Writers), a local writers’ collective. Max Wickert served as an officer in both organizations.

== Weekly poetry readings ==
Among distinguished poets who appeared in the series were Robert Bly, Albert S. Cook, Robert Creeley, Raymond Federman, Allen Ginsberg, Lee Harwood, David Ignatow, Milton Kessler, John Logan, A. Poulin, and John Wieners, as well poets relatively unknown at the time who eventually went on to high honors, such as Charles Baxter (National Book Award finalist, 2000), Carl Dennis (Ruth Lilly Prize 2000, Pulitzer Prize 2002), Cornelius Eady (Lamont Prize, 1985), Robert Hass (Poet Laureate of the United States 1995–97, National Book Award 2007, Pulitzer Prize 2008), and Rosmarie Waldrop (International PEN Award for Poetry in Translation, 2008).

== Other sponsored events ==
During its opening seasons, Outriders worked closely with the Buffalo area Poets-in-the-Schools Program. This program had been conceived state-wide by the New York State Council for the Arts's Galen Williams. It was established in the Buffalo area by cooperation between three agencies: Outriders, which was the recipient of the initial grant; the Department of English at the University at Buffalo; and the university's Office of Cultural Affairs, then directed by Esther Harriott, who coordinated the entire venture. During its opening years, Outriders and Poetry-in-the-Schools frequently overlapped and a number of poets appeared in both programs. (In later seasons, Poetry-in-the-Schools operated independently.)

In its 1970–71 season, Outriders also ran two "Third World Poetry Festivals" that showcased Latino poets Felipe Luciano, Jose-Angel Figueroa and Pedro Pietri (later well known as members of the Nuyorican school) and the late Nigerian poet, Pol Ndu.

In 1978 and 1979, Outriders, through its director, co-sponsored Summer Poetry Festivals with Artpark (Lewiston, NY) and the University at Buffalo, featuring, among others, Marvin Bell, Irving Feldman, Canada's Four Horsemen (bpNichol, Paul Dutton, Steve McCaffery and Rafael Barreto-Rivera), Anselm Hollo, David Ignatow, J.F. Nims, Carlene Polite, Mark Rudman, Louis Simpson, William Stafford, Gerald Stern, Virginia Terris, and Harriett Zinnes.

== Publications ==
During its first years, Outriders also planned a series of publications and chapbooks. Aside from a few ephemeral broadsides, only one of these appeared, Max Wickert’s All the Weight of the Still Midnight (1972; 2nd, expanded edition 2013).

The weekly readings ceased in 1980 and Outriders suspended its activities for a number of years. In 2009, Wickert revived it as a small press which has since issued Ann Goldsmith’s The Spaces Between Us and Martin Pops’s Minoxidyl and Other Stories(2010); Judith Slater's The Wind Turning Pages (2011), Max Wickert's No Cartoons (2011), Gail Fischer's Red Ball Jets (2011), Jeremiah Rush Bowen's Consolations (2012) and Jerry McGuire's Venus Transit as well as An Outriders Anthology: Poetry in Buffalo 1969-1979 and After (2013), Jacob Schepers' A Bundle of Careful Compromises and Linda Stern Zisquit's Return from Elsewhere(2014); Edric Mesmer's of monody and homophonies (2015); the anthology Four Buffalo Poets: Ansie Baird, Ann Goldsmith, David Landrey, Sam Magavern (2016); Carole Southwood's f, the same author's non-fiction novel Abdoo: The Biography of a Piece of White Trash; and most recently Sherry Robbins' "Under Woods" (2020).

For five years, ending in 2015, the press conducted an annual competition open to poets and fiction writers with some significant connection to the Buffalo-Niagara Falls area. The winners of this competition were Jeremiah Rush Bowen (2011); Jerry McGuire (2012), Jacob Schepers and Linda Zisquit (co-winners 2014); and Edric Mesmer, Of Monodies and Homophony (2015).

Recently Outriders, in collaboration with Carole Southwell's Niagara River Salon, established the series of occasional on-line Niagara River Salon Chapbooks, downloadable free (for personal use only) from its web site. The first of these, "A Farewell Fast Shrift for John Marvin" will be available in late 2023.
