= Lola Beer Ebner Sculpture Garden =

Coordinates: 32.077479°N 34.786227°E

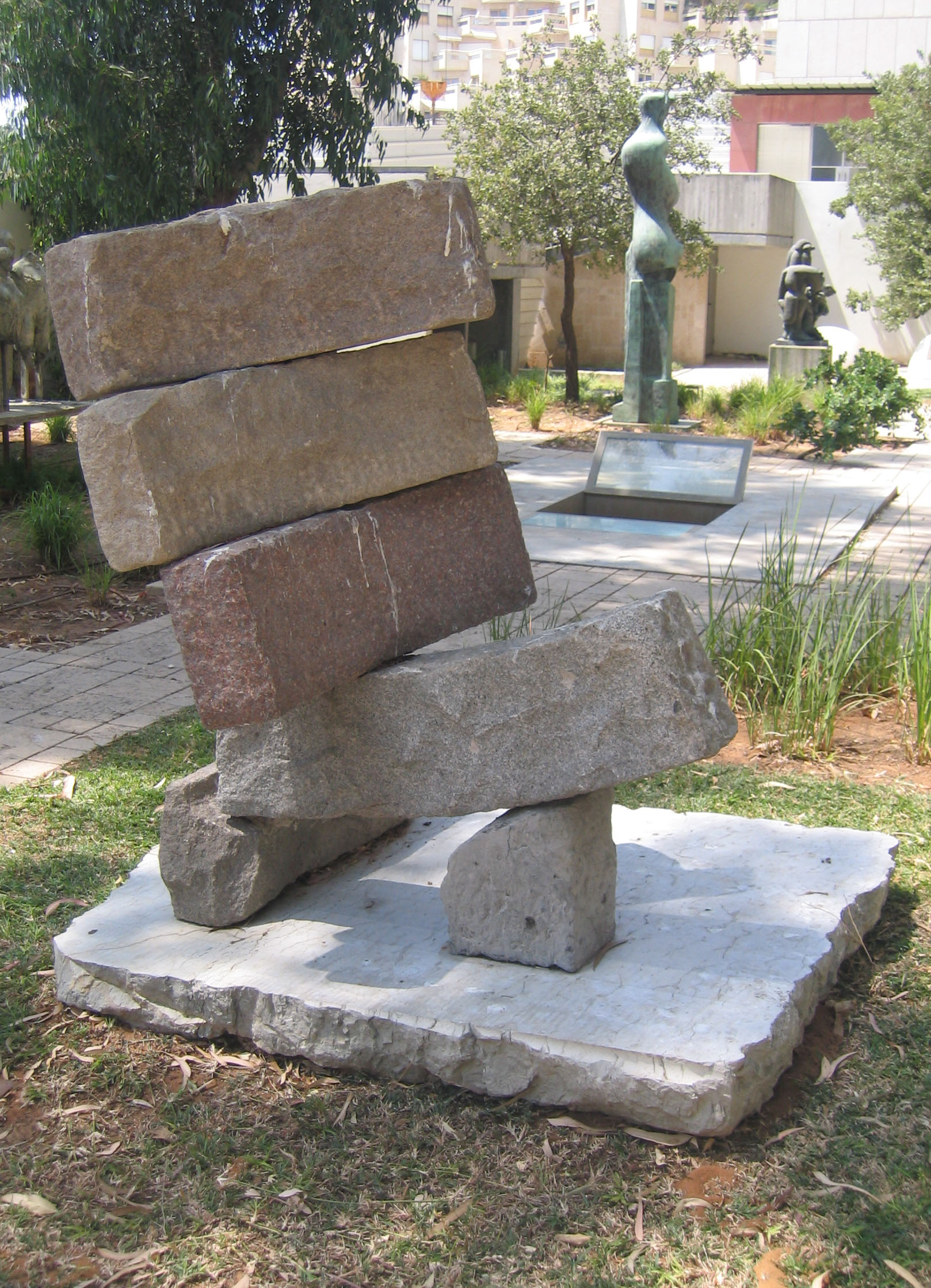
Works by Kadishman, Moore and Lipchitz in the Lola Beer Ebner Sculpture Garden in Tel Aviv

The Lola Beer Ebner Sculpture Garden is a sculpture garden at the Tel Aviv Museum of Art. It includes a collection of modern and contemporary sculpture, and other exhibits from the Tel Aviv Museum of Art, displayed on public terraces around the museum complex.

The Tel Aviv Museum of Art was founded in 1932 in what is now Independence Hall and since 1971 has been located on King Saul Avenue in Tel Aviv. The sculpture garden was founded by Lola Beer Ebner in 1999, in memory of designer Dolfi Ebner (1915–1997).

== Gallery ==
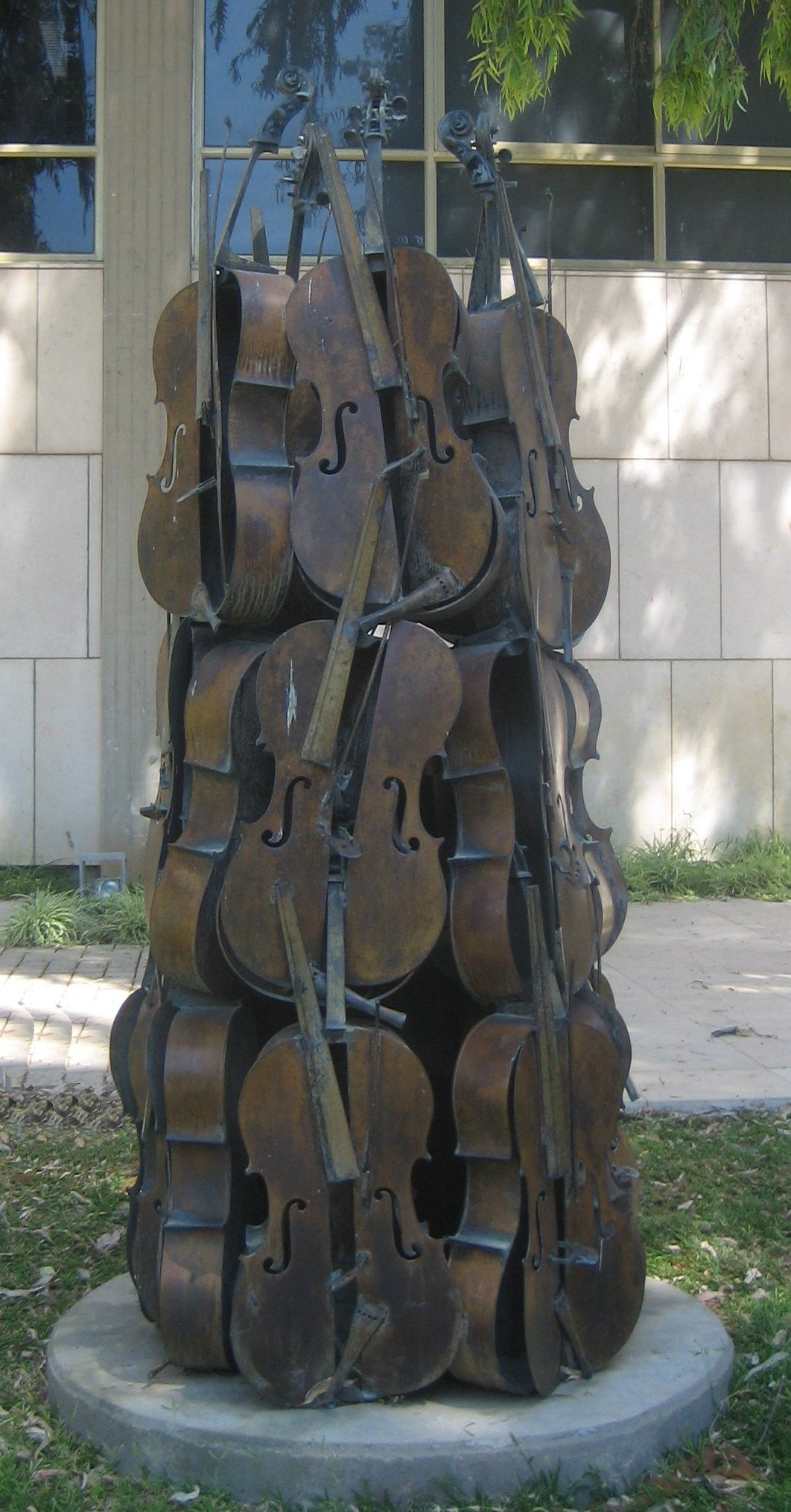
Nr. 1 : Arman, The Music Power II (1986)

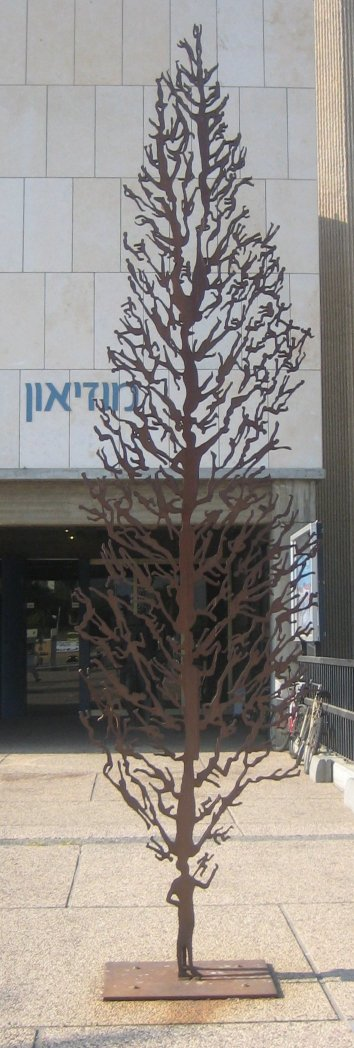
Nr. 2 : Zadok Ben-David, Lone Cypress (2006)

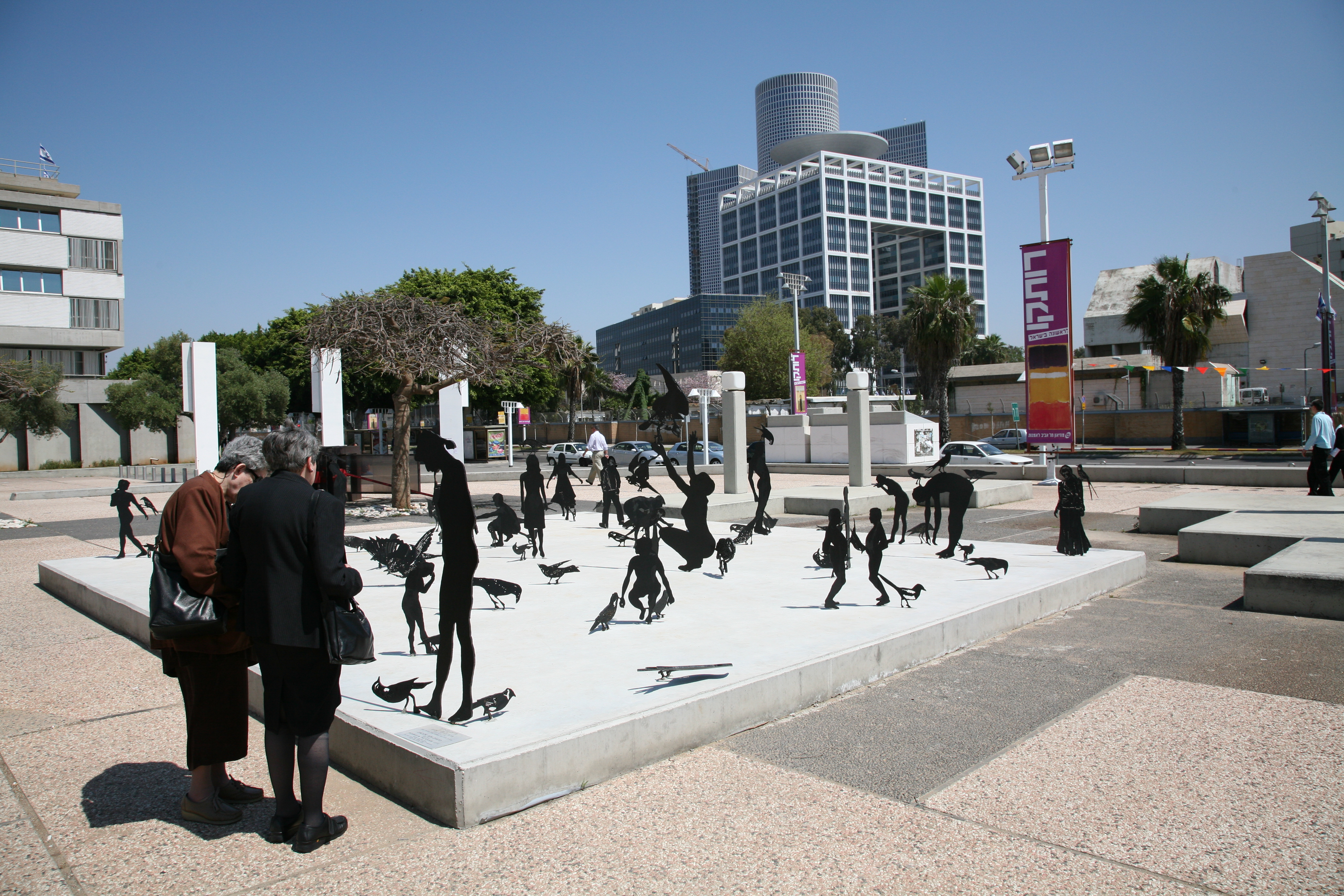
Nr. 3 : Zadok Ben-David, Troubles in the Square (2006)

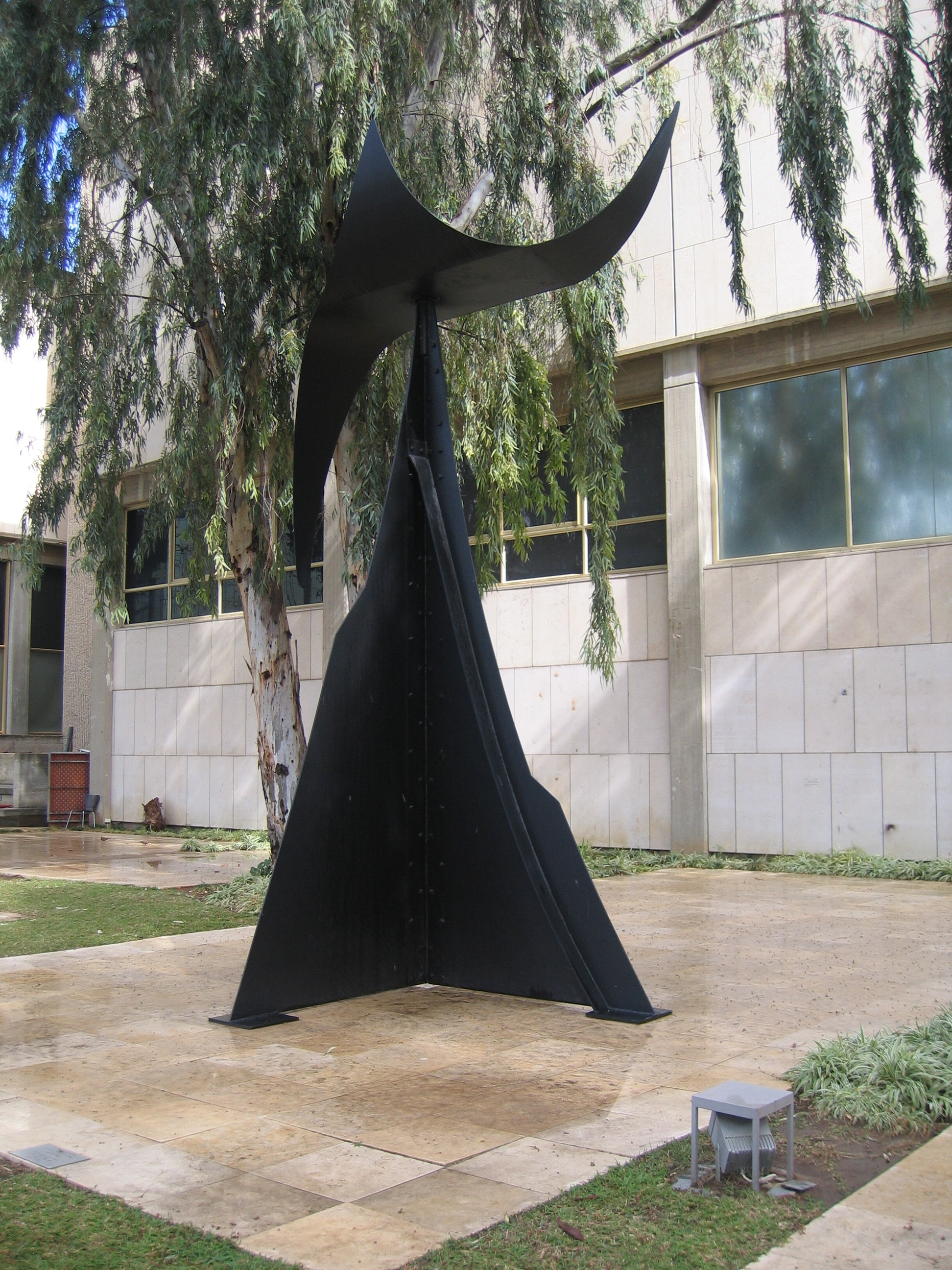
Nr. 4 : Alexander Calder, Feuille d'arbre (1974)

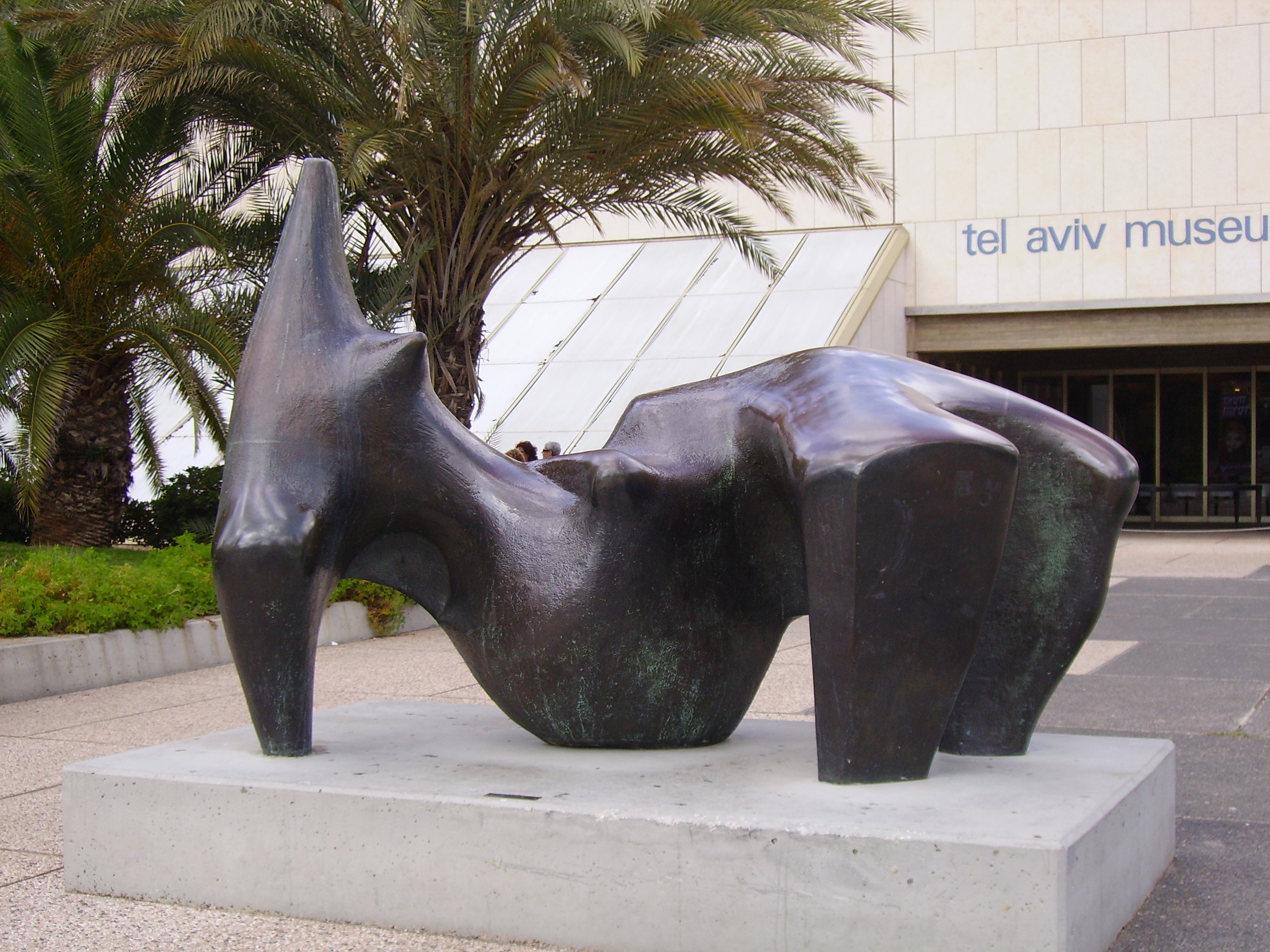
Reclining Figure 1969–70, Henry Moore, 1960s

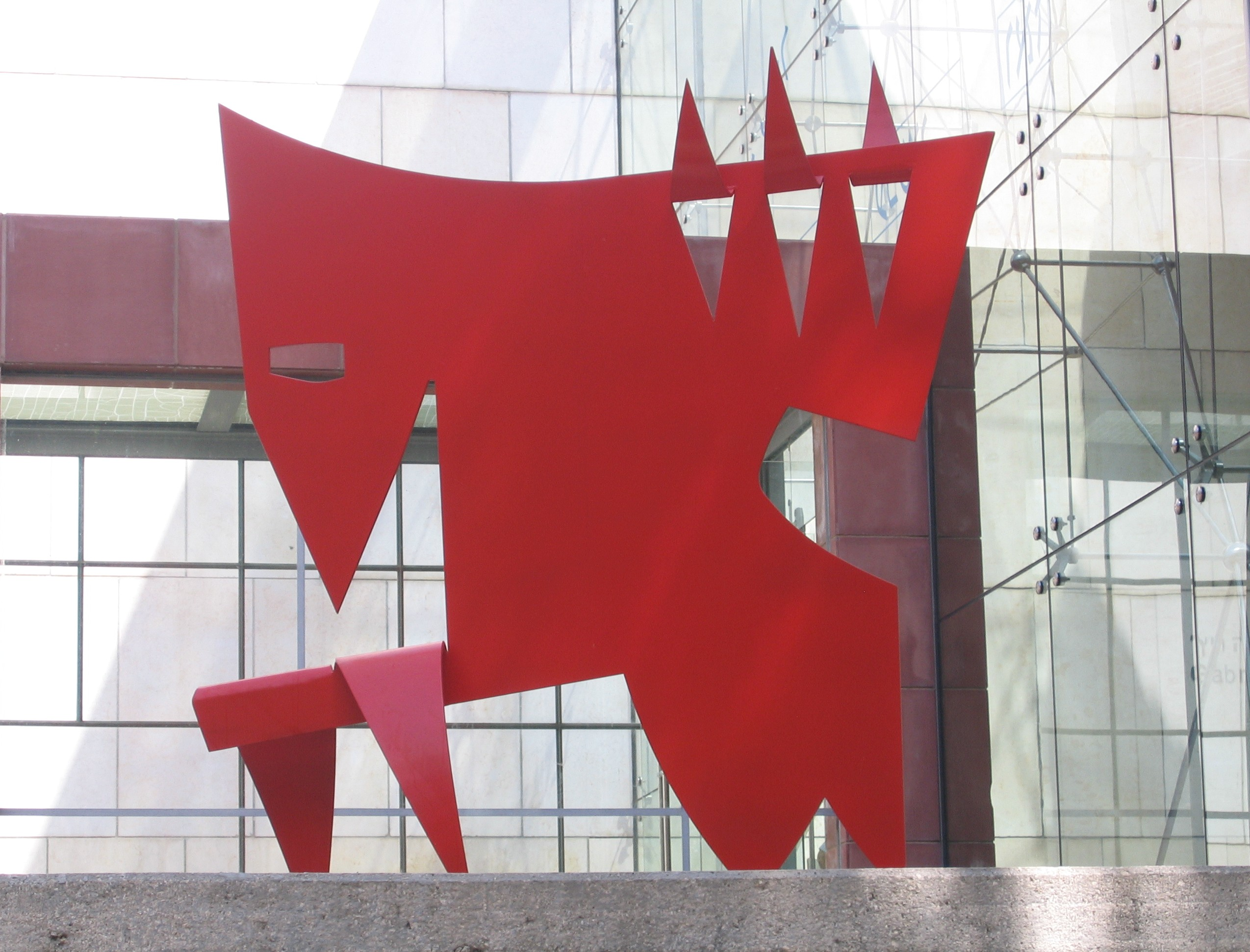
Animal, Dov Feigin (1958)
