= Tel Aviv Museum of Art =

Art museum in Tel Aviv, Israel

- מוזיאון תל אביב לאמנות

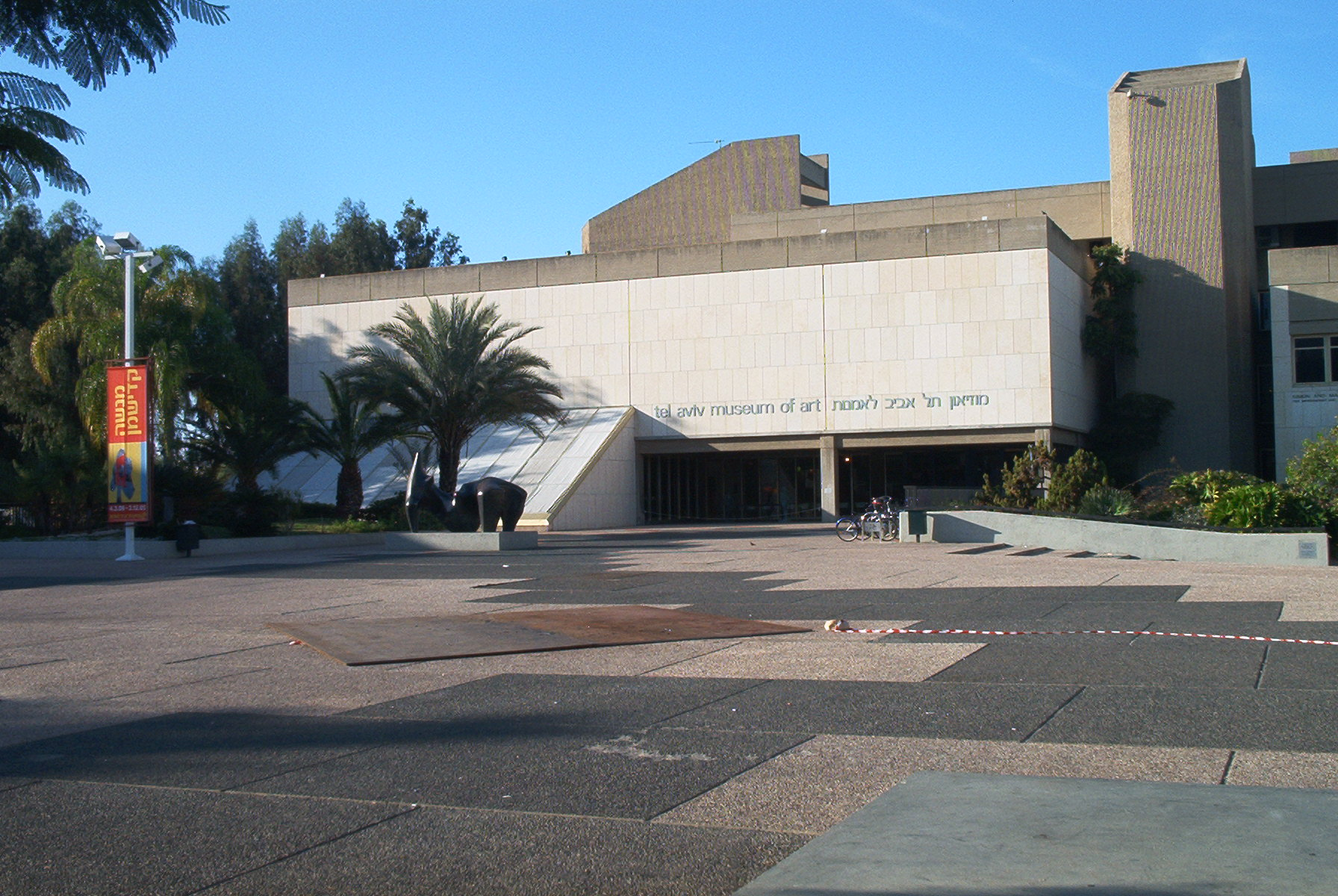
- Tel Aviv Museum of Art, main building
- Interactive fullscreen map
- Established: 1932; 94 years ago
- Location: 27 Shaul Hamelech Blvd, Tel Aviv
- Coordinates: 32°04′39″N 34°47′12″E
- Type: Art museum
- Director: Tania Coen-Uzzielli
- Curator: Mira Lapidot
- Public transit access: Bus Nos. 9, 18, 28, 70, 90, 111
- Website: www.tamuseum.org.il/en/

The Tel Aviv Museum of Art (Hebrew: מוּזֵאוֹן תֵּל אָבִיב לְאֻמָּנוּת, romanized: Muzēʾon Tēl ʾĀvīv Ləʾommānuṯ; Arabic: مَتْحَف تَلّ أَبِيب لِلفُنُون, romanized: Matḥaf Tall ʾAbīb Līl-funūn) is an art museum in Tel Aviv, Israel. The museum is dedicated to the preservation and display of modern and contemporary art both from Israel and around the world.

== History ==
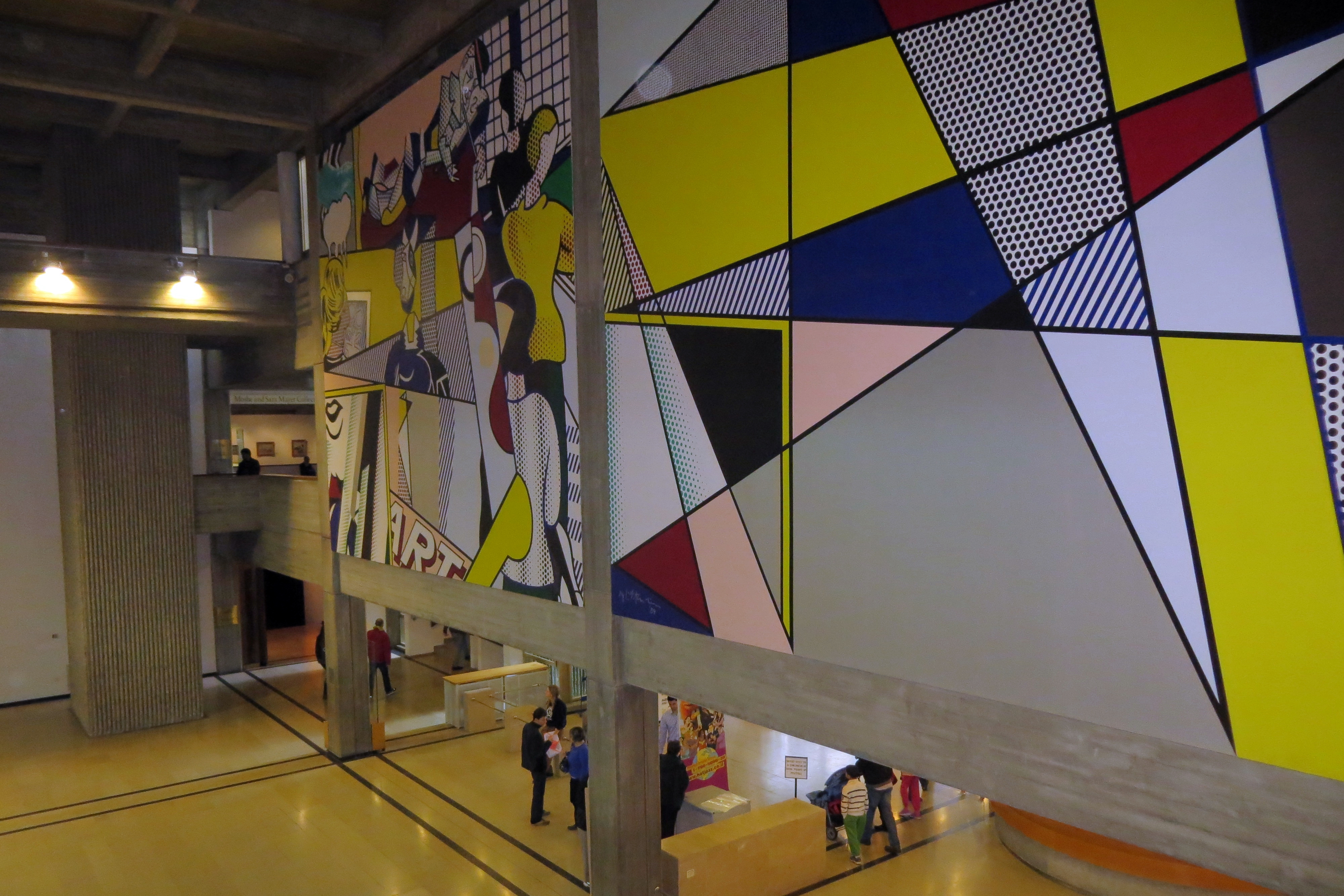
In 1989, Roy Lichtenstein created a giant two-panel mural especially for the museum hall

The Tel Aviv Museum of Art was established in 1932 in a building at 16 Rothschild Boulevard that was the former home of Tel Aviv's first mayor, Meir Dizengoff, who had donated the property for a museum in memory of his wife, Zina, following her death in 1930. Haim Gamzou was tapped to lead the foundation of the new museum as its first director. On 14 May 1948, 250 delegates quietly gathered at the museum for the historic signing of the Israeli Declaration of Independence. In 1971, the building became Independence Hall when the museum relocated to 27 Shaul Hamelech Boulevard.

Curator Nehama Guralnik began working at the museum in 1971, when French was the common language among staff, including Gamzou the director, administrators, and the curators. Catalogues were printed in French and Hebrew, with English introduced later that decade. Guralnik curated more than 40 exhibitions during her 34-year tenure as international art curator.

The Helena Rubinstein Pavilion for Contemporary Art opened in 1959. Planning for a new building began in 1963 when the museum's collections of modern and contemporary art began to outgrow the premises. Construction commenced in 1966 but stopped for two years due to shortage of funds, before moving to its current location in 1971.

Another wing was added in 1999 and the Lola Beer Ebner Sculpture Garden was established. The museum also contains "The Joseph and Rebecca Meyerhoff Art Education Center", opened in 1988.

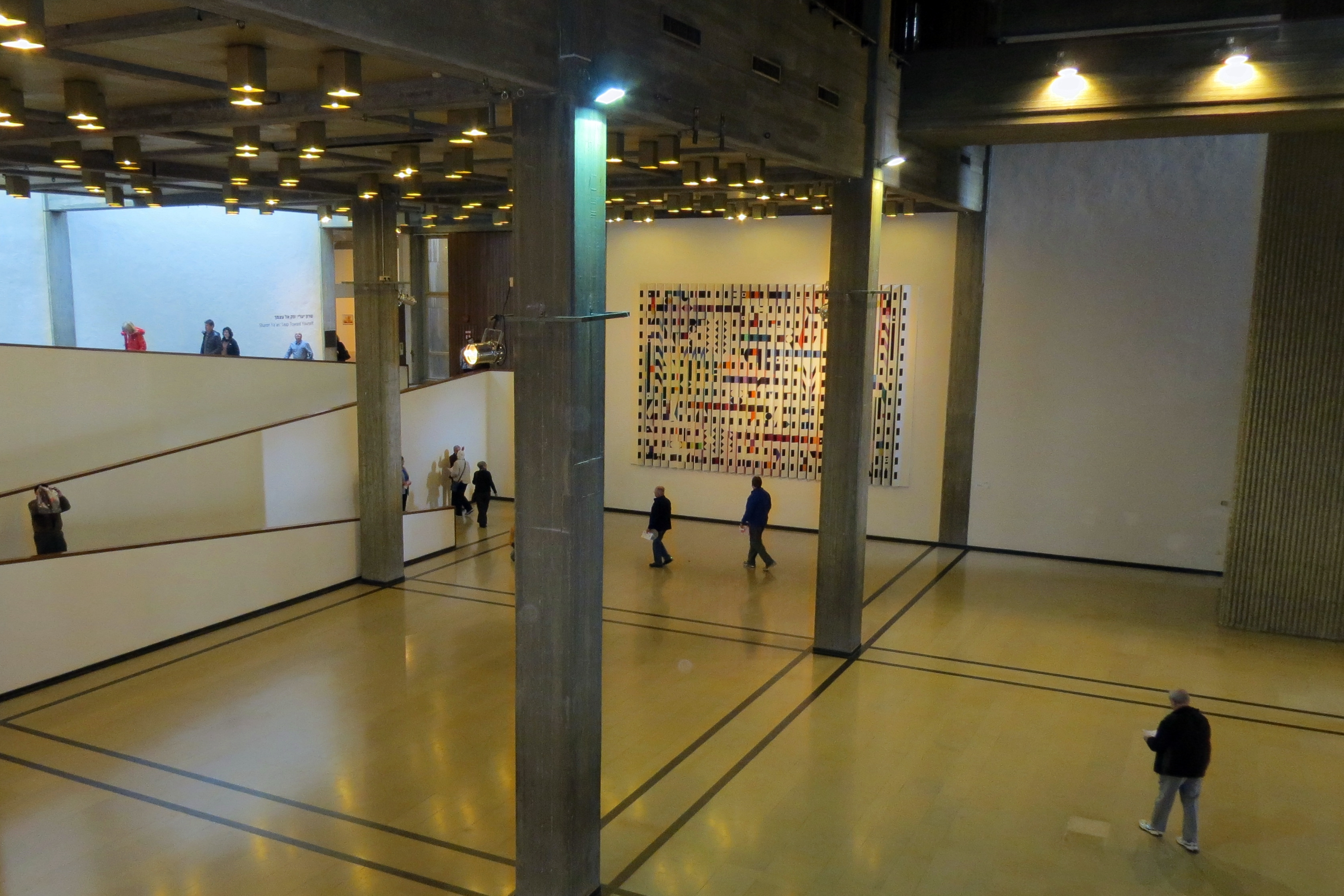
Tel Aviv Museum of Art, December 2013. The work "March of Time" by the artist Yaakov Agam is visible in the background.

The museum houses a comprehensive collection of classical and contemporary art, especially Israeli art, a sculpture garden and a youth wing.

Suzanne Landau, following 34 years at the Israel Museum, was appointed director and chief curator of the museum in 2012.

In 2018, the museum set an all-time attendance record with 1,018,323 visitors, ranking 70th on the list of most visited art museums. In 2019, the museum set a new attendance record, ranking 49th with 1,322,439 visitors. In 2022, it again ranked 49th, with 1,070,714 visitors. In 2023, it was ranked 48th on The Art Magazine's list of the 100 most popular museums in the world.

On 23 March 2023, Tel Aviv Museum of Art was partially closed, in participation with Israel's "day of paralysis" during the 2023 Israeli judicial reform protests. Following the 7 October attacks and subsequent incidents related to the Gaza war, the Israel–Hezbollah conflict, and the 2024 Iran–Israel conflict, the museum removed several items on display and stored them for safekeeping in a secured basement. It also moved other exhibitions to a more protected space on the facility's lower levels. The plaza in front of the museum also became an encampment dedicated to the hostages in Gaza called Hostages Square.

In July 2023, the Tel Aviv Museum of Art initiated review of a $670,000 donation by Austrian billionaire Ingrid Flick, whose fortune was allegedly inherited through marriage to the heir of Friedrich Flick, a German industrialist found guilty of war crimes. In response, Flick stated that “As a person with an affinity for art and a collector of modern art, it has been a personal desire of mine for many years to support art that is also open to the public. [...] The Tel Aviv Museum of Art was, therefore, only one of several institutions to which I am pleased to donate. This donation and my personal motivation to contribute to the Tel Aviv Museum of Art has nothing to do with the history of my late husband’s family. Such speculation serves only to insult the valuable work of the Tel Aviv Museum of Art, which I will gladly continue to support in the future.”

== Permanent collection ==
The Museum's collection represents some of the leading artists of the first half of the 20th century and many of the major movements of modern art in this period: Fauvism, German Expressionism, Cubism, Futurism, Russian Constructivism, the De Stijl movement and Surrealism, French art from the Impressionists and Post-Impressionists to the School of Paris including works of Chaïm Soutine, key works by Pablo Picasso from the Blue and Neo-Classical periods to his Late Period, Cubist paintings by Albert Gleizes, Jean Metzinger, several sculptures by Jacques Lipchitz, and Surrealists works of Joan Miró.

One section of the Museum displays the history of Israeli art and its origins among local artists in the pre-state Zionist community of the early twentieth century.

In 1989, the American pop artist Roy Lichtenstein created a giant two-panel mural especially for the Tel Aviv Museum of Art. It hangs in the entrance foyer.

The Collection includes several masterpieces, among them the painting Friedericke Maria Beer, 1916 by the Austrian artist Gustav Klimt and Untitled Improvisation V, 1914, by the Russian master Wassily Kandinsky.

The Peggy Guggenheim Collection, donated in 1950, includes 36 works by Abstract and Surrealist artists, including works of Jackson Pollock, William Baziotes, and Richard Pousette-Dart, and Surrealists works by Yves Tanguy, Roberto Matta, and André Masson.

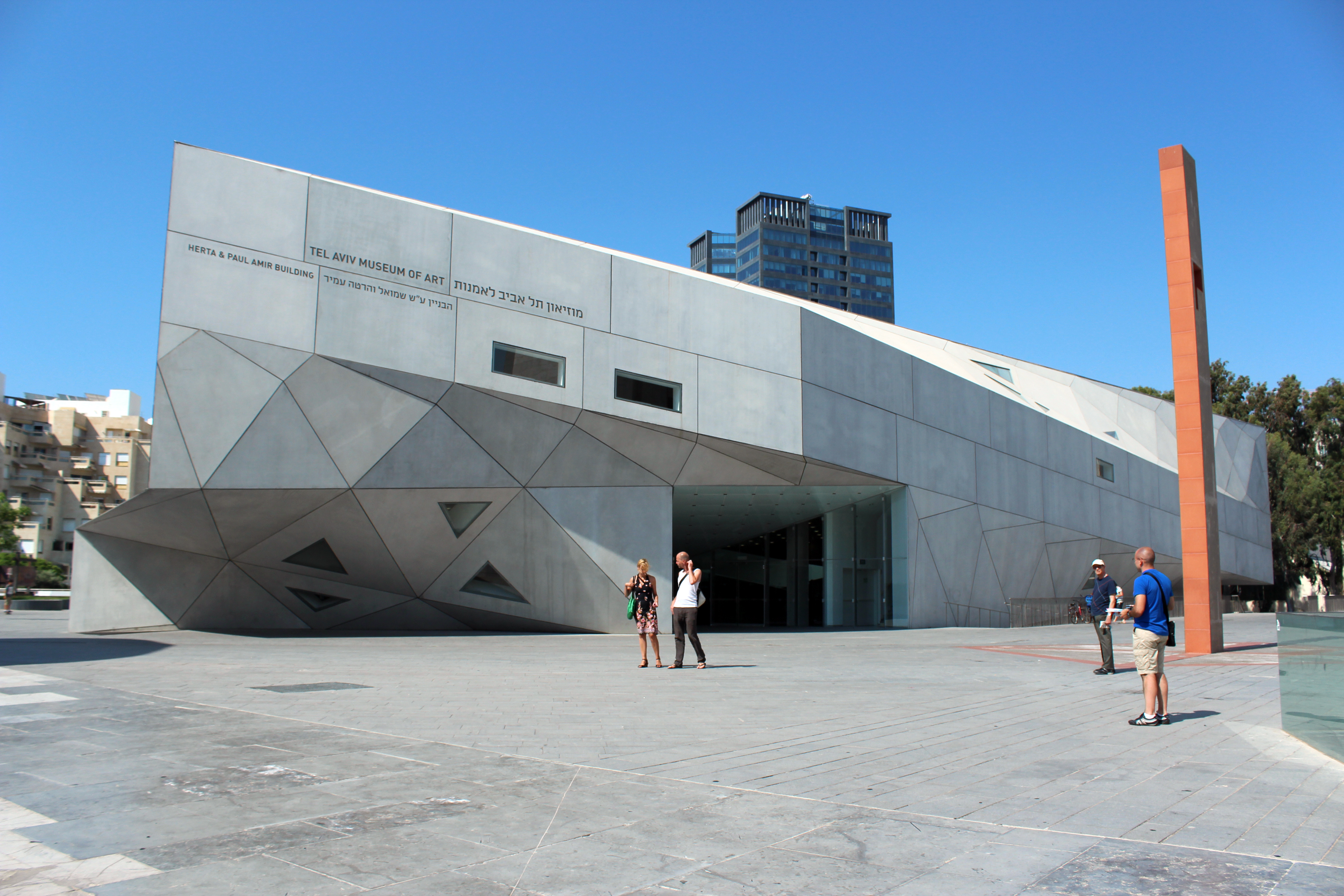
Herta and Paul Amir Building

Sculptures are displayed in the entrance plaza and in an internal sculpture garden.

In addition to a permanent collection, the museum hosts temporary exhibitions of individual artists' work and group shows curated around a common theme.

== Buildings (21st century) ==
The Tel Aviv Museum of Art includes The Paulson Family Foundation Building, its main structure on Shaul Hamelech Boulevard; the Herta and Paul Amir Building; and the Eyal Ofer Pavilion.

=== Paulson Family Foundation Building ===
Marking its 90th anniversary, the museum's main building was refurbished and renamed The Paulson Family Foundation Building in 2021, in honour of its benefactors.

=== Herta and Paul Amir Building ===
In November 2011, the Herta and Paul Amir Building on the western side of the museum opened. It houses an Israeli Architecture Archive, and a new section of Photography and Visual arts. The new building was designed by architect Preston Scott Cohen. The new wing houses 18,500 square feet of gallery space over five floors.

The Amir building also contains Pastel, a fine dining restaurant led by Chef Hilel Tavakuli.

=== Eyal Ofer Pavilion ===
In May 2023, following an extensive renovation of the Helena Rubinstein Pavilion for Contemporary Art, it was reopened as the Eyal Ofer Pavilion, in honour of its contemporary benefactor, with the first retrospective of the works of Swiss sculptor Alberto Giacometti in Israel exhibited on all four levels. The renovation was led by architect Amnon Rechter, whose father, Israel Prize laureate architect Yaakov Rechter, built the original pavilion in 1959.

== Gallery ==
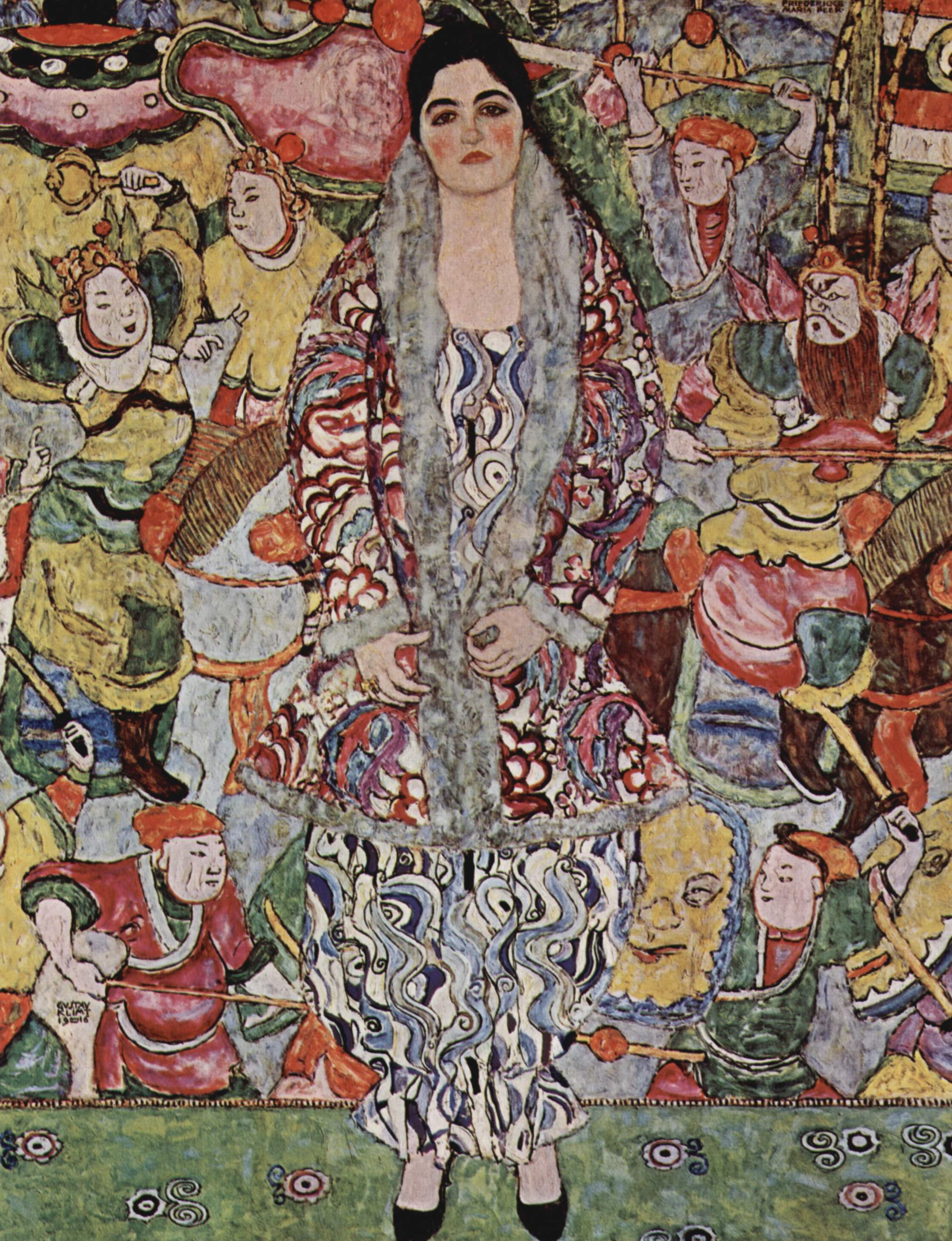
Portrait of Friederike Maria Beer, Gustav Klimt, 1916

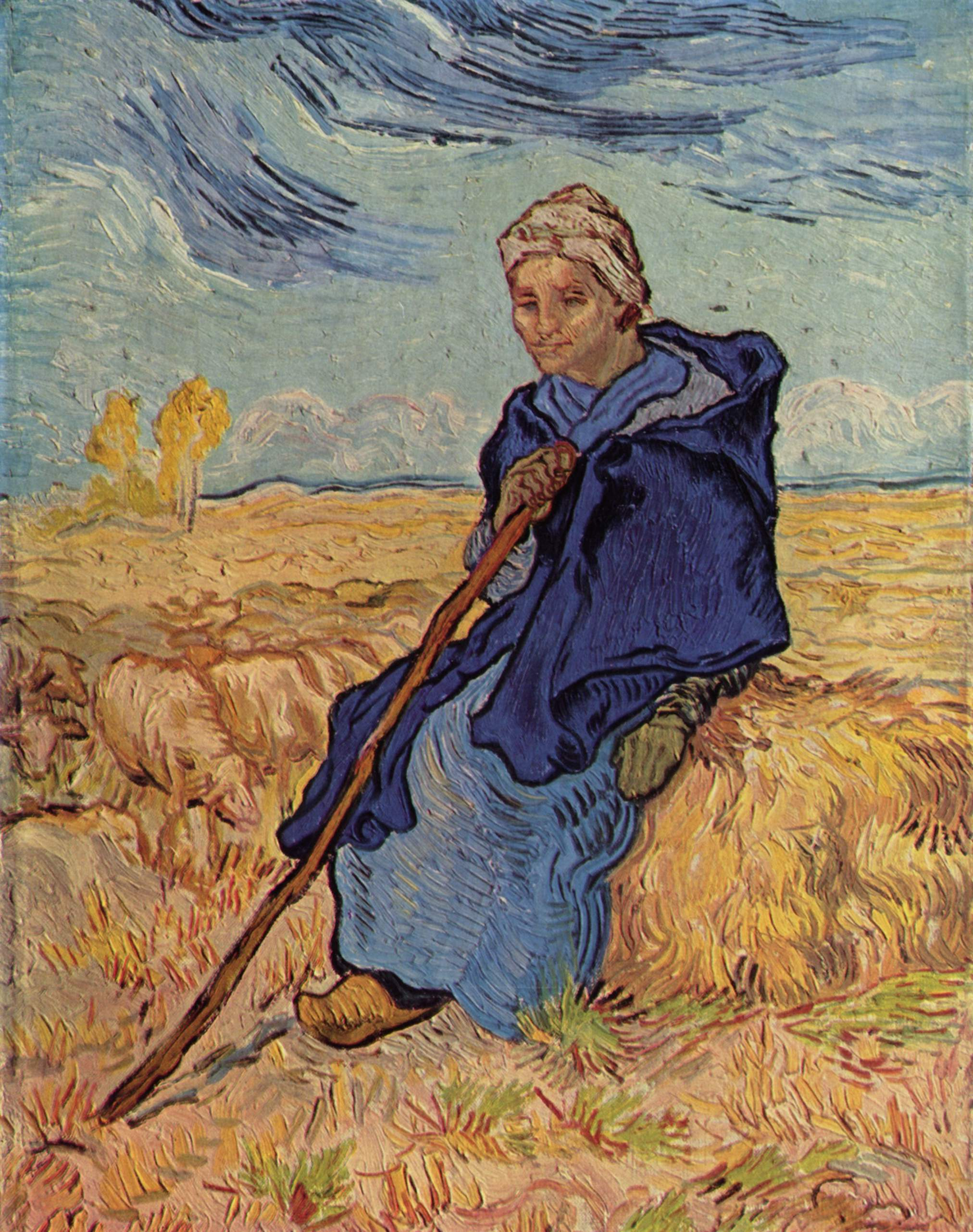
The Shepherdess (after Millet), Vincent Willem van Gogh, 1899

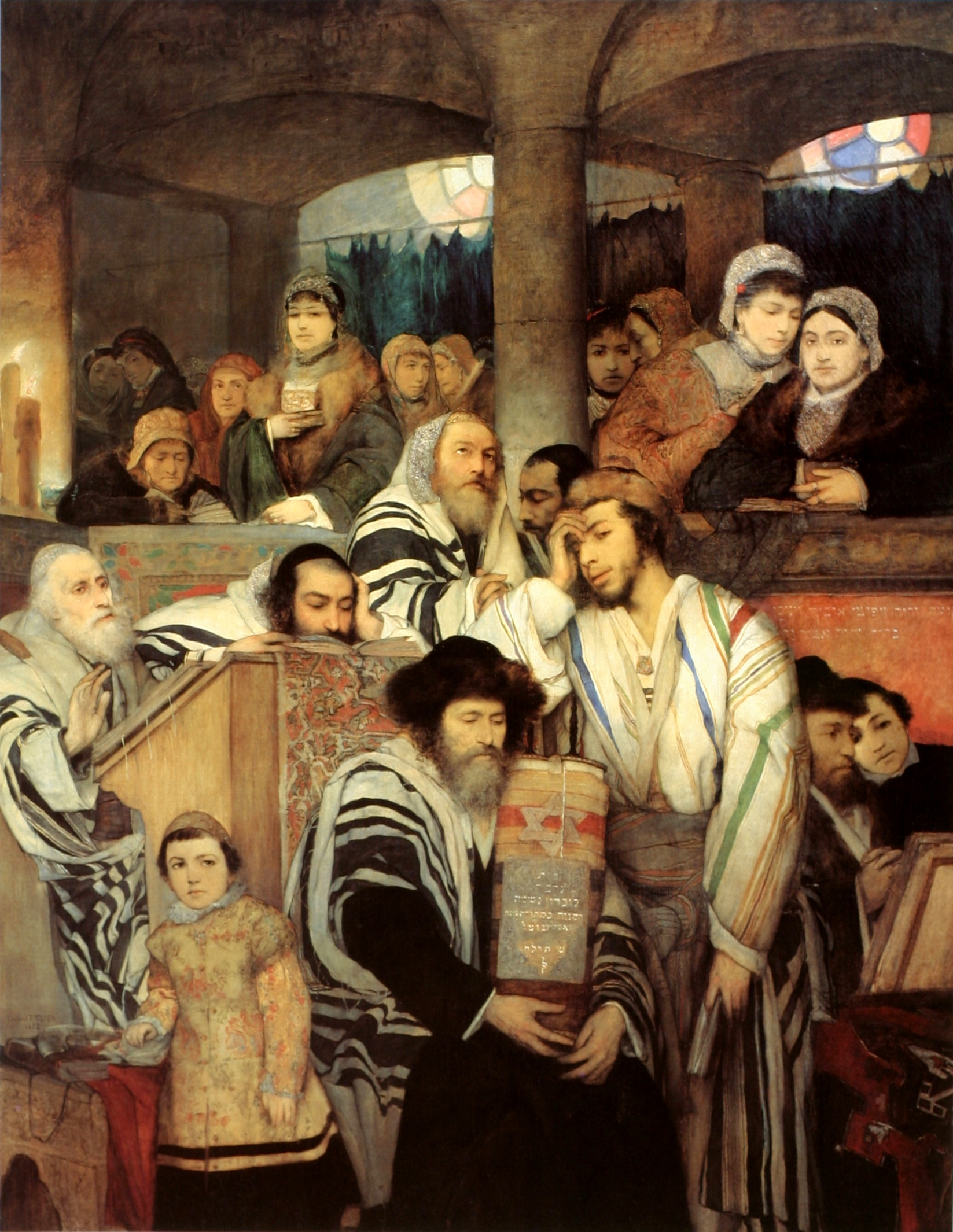
Jews Praying in the Synagogue on Yom Kippur, Maurycy Gottlieb, 1878

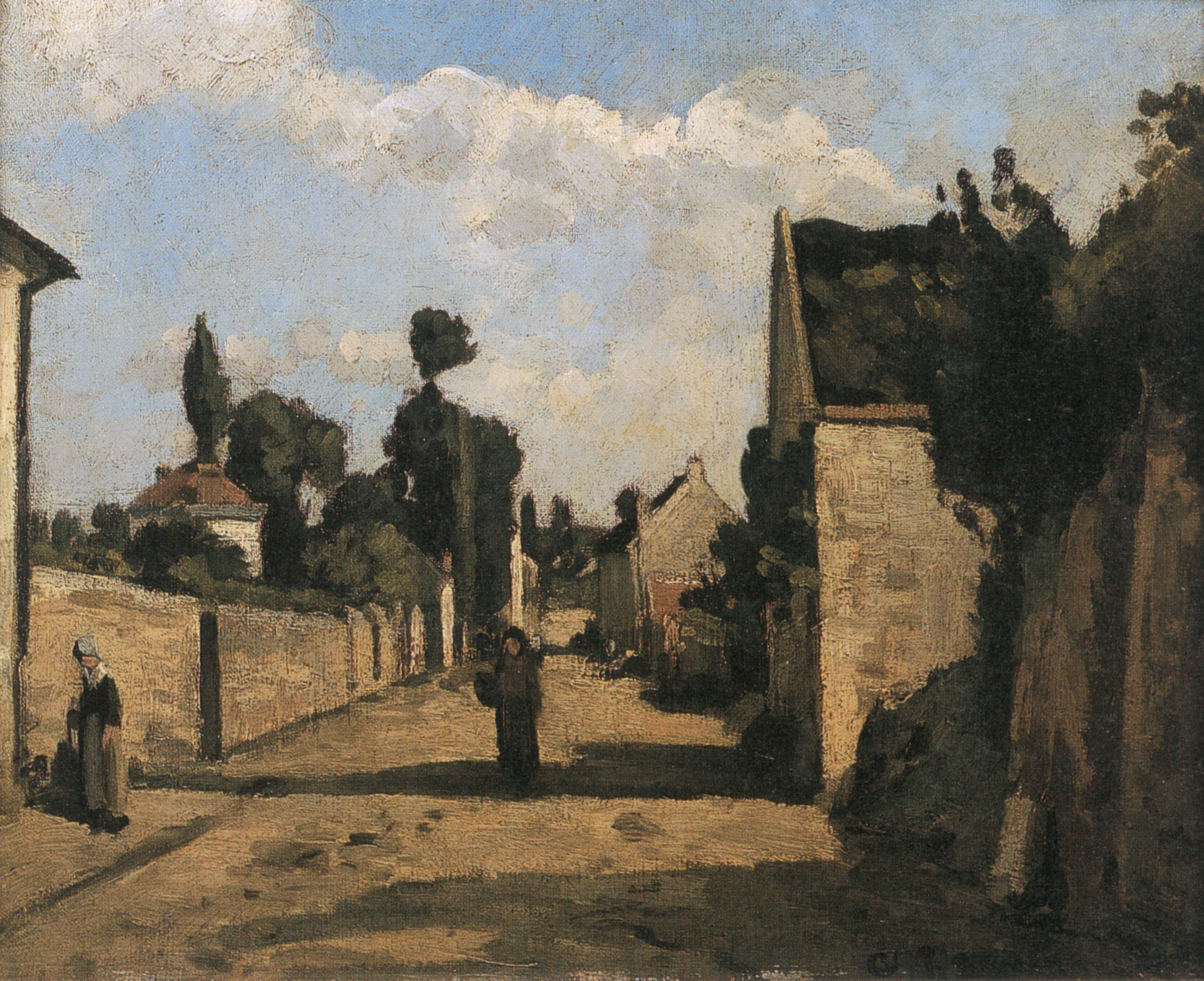
Rue L´Hermitage, Camille Pissarro, 1866

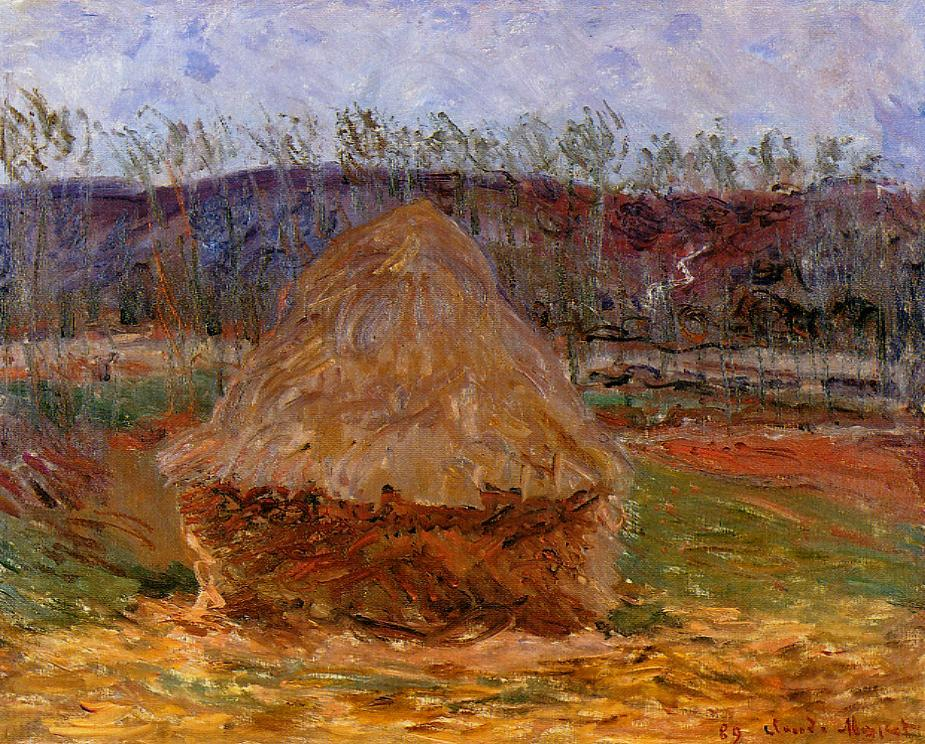
Grainstack at Giverny, Claude Monet, 1889

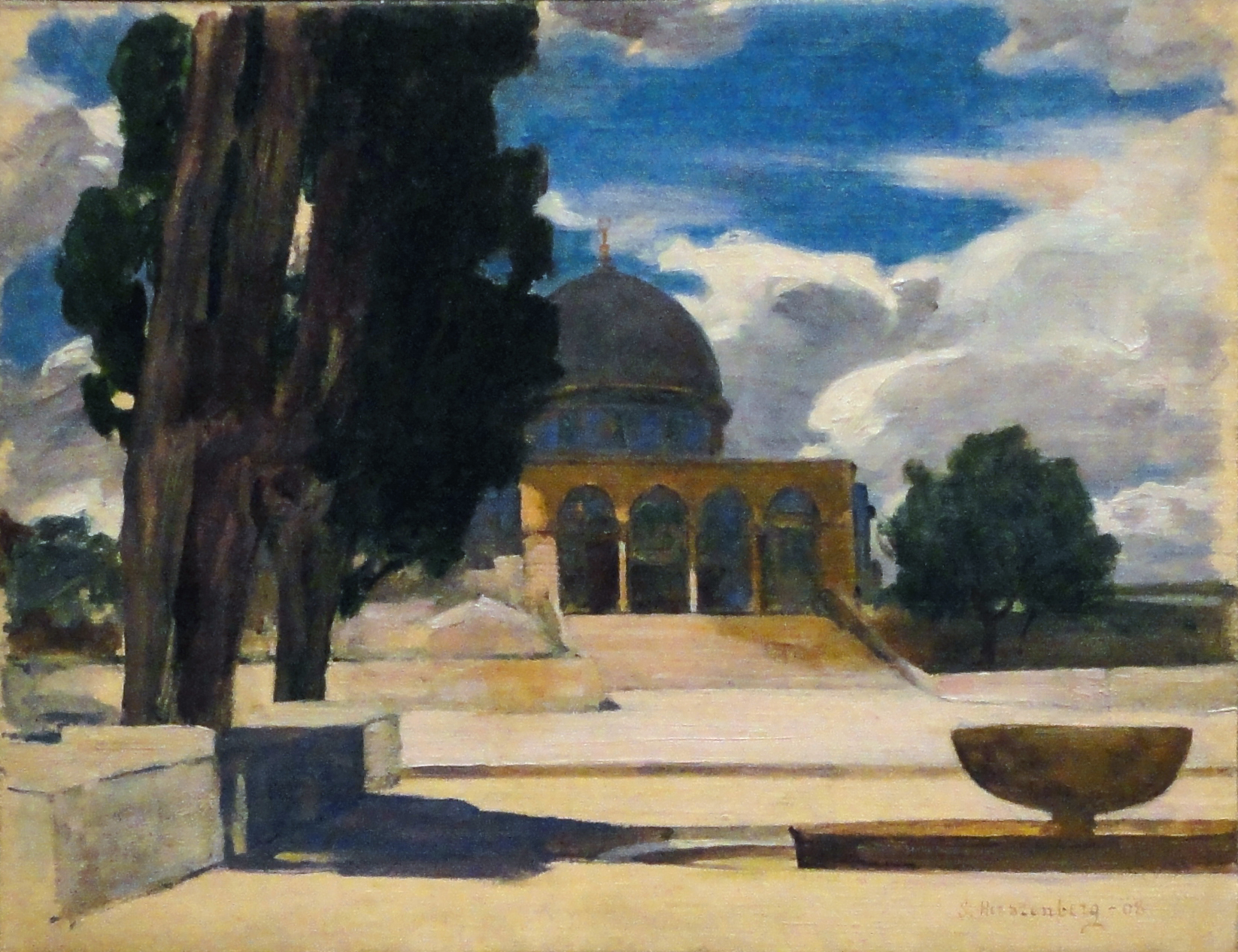
Dome of the rock, Samuel Hirszenberg, 1908

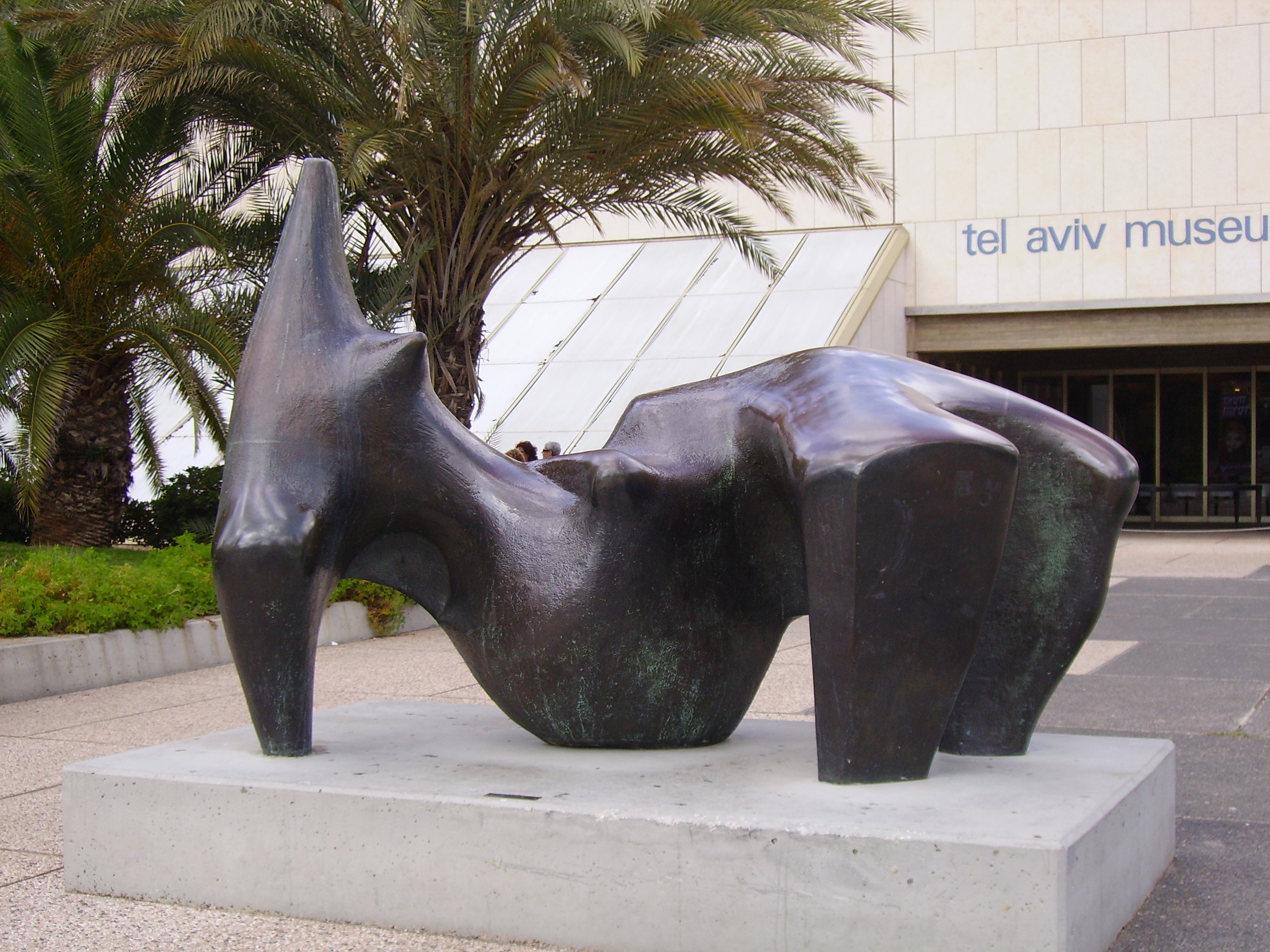
Reclining Figure 1969–70, Henry Moore, 1960s

== See also ==
- Israeli art
- List of largest art museums
- Hostages Square
