= Linda Stern Zisquit =

American-born poet

Linda Stern Zisquit (Hebrew: לינדה שטרן זיסקיט) is an American-born Israeli poet and translator. She teaches poetry, Hebrew literature and poetry translation at Bar-Ilan University.

== Biography ==
Linda Stern (later Zisquit) was born in Buffalo, NY. She studied at Tufts University and, later, at Harvard University and SUNY Buffalo. In 1978, she moved to Israel and settled in Jerusalem. She is married to the lawyer Donald Zisquit, and is the mother of five children. She also runs the ArtSpace Gallery at her home in Jerusalem's German Colony.

== Literary career ==
Zisquit teaches poetry, Hebrew literature and poetry translation at Bar Ilan University where she is Associate Professor and Poetry Coordinator for the Shaindy Rudoff MA in Creative Writing Program. She has published five collections of original poetry, most recently Return from Elsewhere (co-winner of the Outriders Poetry Project, Buffalo, NY, 2014) and Havoc: New & Selected Poems (2013) as well as several volumes of English translations of Hebrew poetry, including among them the poems of Wild Light: Selected Poems of Yona Wallach (1997) for which she won an NEA Translation Grant and These Mountains: Selected Poems of Rivka Miriam (2009), a finalist for the National Jewish Book Award in Poetry.

== Published works ==
=== Poetry collections ===
- Ritual Bath (Broken Moon Press, Seattle, WA, 1993)
- Unopened Letters (Sheep Meadow Press, Riverdale-on-Hudson, NY, 1996)
- The Face in the Window (The Sheep Meadow Press, 2005)
- Havoc: New and Selected Poems (Sheep Meadow Press, Rhinebeck, NY, 2013) ISBN 978-1937679149
- Return from Elsewhere (Outriders Poetry Project, Buffalo, NY, 2014) ISBN 978-0991072415

=== Translation ===
- Open-Eyed Land: Desert Poems of Yehuda Amichai (Schocken Press, Tel Aviv, 1992)
- The Book of Ruth (1996) – London, free translation, collaboration with artist Maty Grunberg, portfolio of 18 woodcuts, limited edition (Osband Press, London, 1996). In the permanent collections of the British Museum and La Salle University Art Museum.
- Wild Light: Selected Poems of Yona Wallach (Sheep Meadow Press, 1997) ISBN 978-1878818546
- Let the Words: Selected Poems of Yona Wallach (Sheep Meadow Press, 2006)
- These Mountains: Selected Poems of Rivka Miriam (Toby Press, 2009) ISBN 978-1592642496
