= Menashe Kadishman =

Israeli sculptor and painter (1932–2015)

Menashe Kadishman מנשה קדישמן
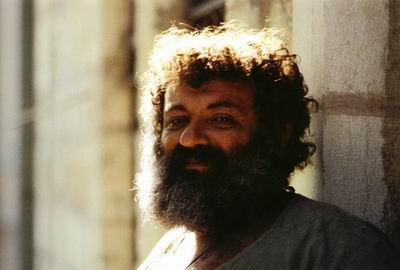
- Menashe Kadishman, 1979
- Born: August 21, 1932; Tel Aviv, Mandatory Palestine
- Died: May 8, 2015 (aged 82); Tel Hashomer, Ramat Gan, Israel
- Education: Avni Institute of Art and Design
- Known for: Sculptor and painter.
- Website: kadishman.com

Menashe Kadishman (Hebrew: מנשה קדישמן; August 21, 1932 – May 8, 2015) was an Israeli sculptor and painter.

== Biography ==
Kadishman, 1954

Menashe Kadishman was born in Mandate Palestine to Bilha and Ben-Zion Kadishman. His father died when he was 15 years old. He left school to help his mother and provide for the family.

From 1947 to 1950, Kadishman studied with the Israeli sculptor Moshe Sternschuss at the Avni Institute of Art and Design under Aharon Avni in Tel Aviv, and in 1954 with the Israeli sculptor Rudi Lehmann in Jerusalem.

In 1950, Kadishman joined the Nahal infantry brigade, and he worked as a shepherd on Kibbutz Ma'ayan Baruch for the next three years. This experience with nature, sheep, and shepherding had a significant impact on his later artistic work and career.

In 1959, Kadishman moved to London to study at Saint Martin's School of Art and the Slade School of Art. In 1959-1960 he also studied with Anthony Caro and Reg Butler. He had his first one-man show there in 1965 at the Grosvenor Gallery. In 1972, he returned to Israel.

On May 8, 2015, Kadishman died at Sheba Medical Center in Tel Hashomer.

== Art career ==
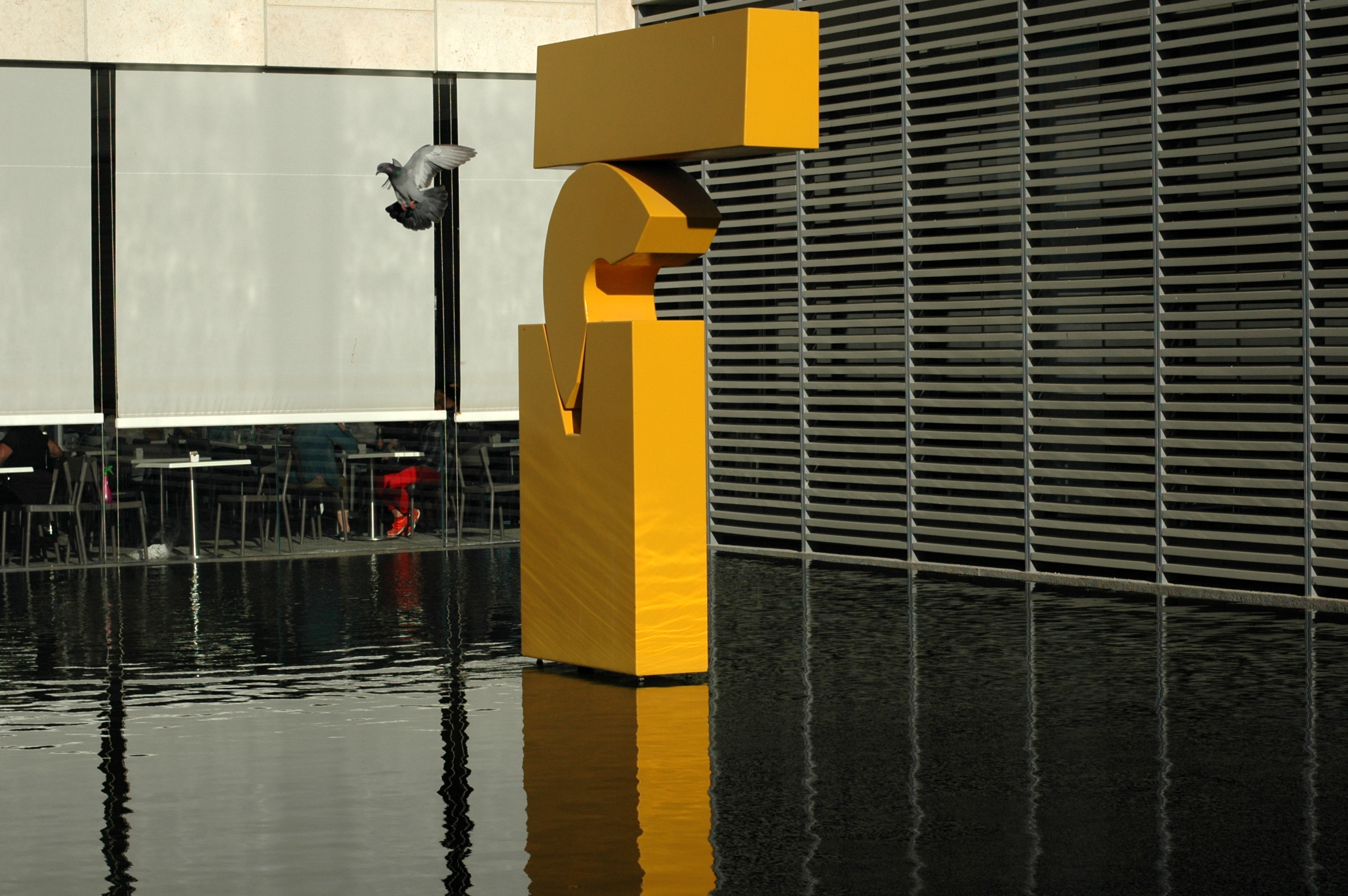
"Suspense," Israel Museum, Jerusalem

In the 1960s, Kadishman's sculptures were Minimalist in style, and so designed as to appear to defy gravity. This was achieved either through careful balance and construction, as in Suspense (1966), or by using glass and metal so that the metal appeared unsupported, as in Segments (1968). The glass allowed the environment to be part of the work.

The first major appearance of sheep in his work was at the 1978 Venice Biennale, where Kadishman presented a flock of colored live sheep as living art. In 1995, he began painting portraits of sheep by the hundreds, and even thousands, each one different from the next. These instantly recognizable sheep portraits soon became his artistic "trademark".

== Awards and recognition ==
- 1960 the America-Israel Cultural Foundation Scholarship.
- 1961, the Sainsbury Scholarship, London.
- 1967 first prize for sculpture, 5th Paris Biennale.
- 1978 Sandberg Prize recipient
- 1980 America-Israel Cultural Foundation Scholarship
- 1981 Eugene Kolb Prize for Israeli Graphic Arts, Tel Aviv Museum Prize of the Jury
- 1981 Norwegian International Print Biennale, Fredrikstad.
- 1984 Mendel Pundik Prize for Israeli Art, Tel Aviv Museum
- 1990 the Dizengoff Prize for Sculpture.
- 1995 the Israel Prize, for sculpture.
- 2002 the Honorary Fellowship Award from the Tel Aviv Museum of Art.

== Sculptures and public installations ==
=== United States ===
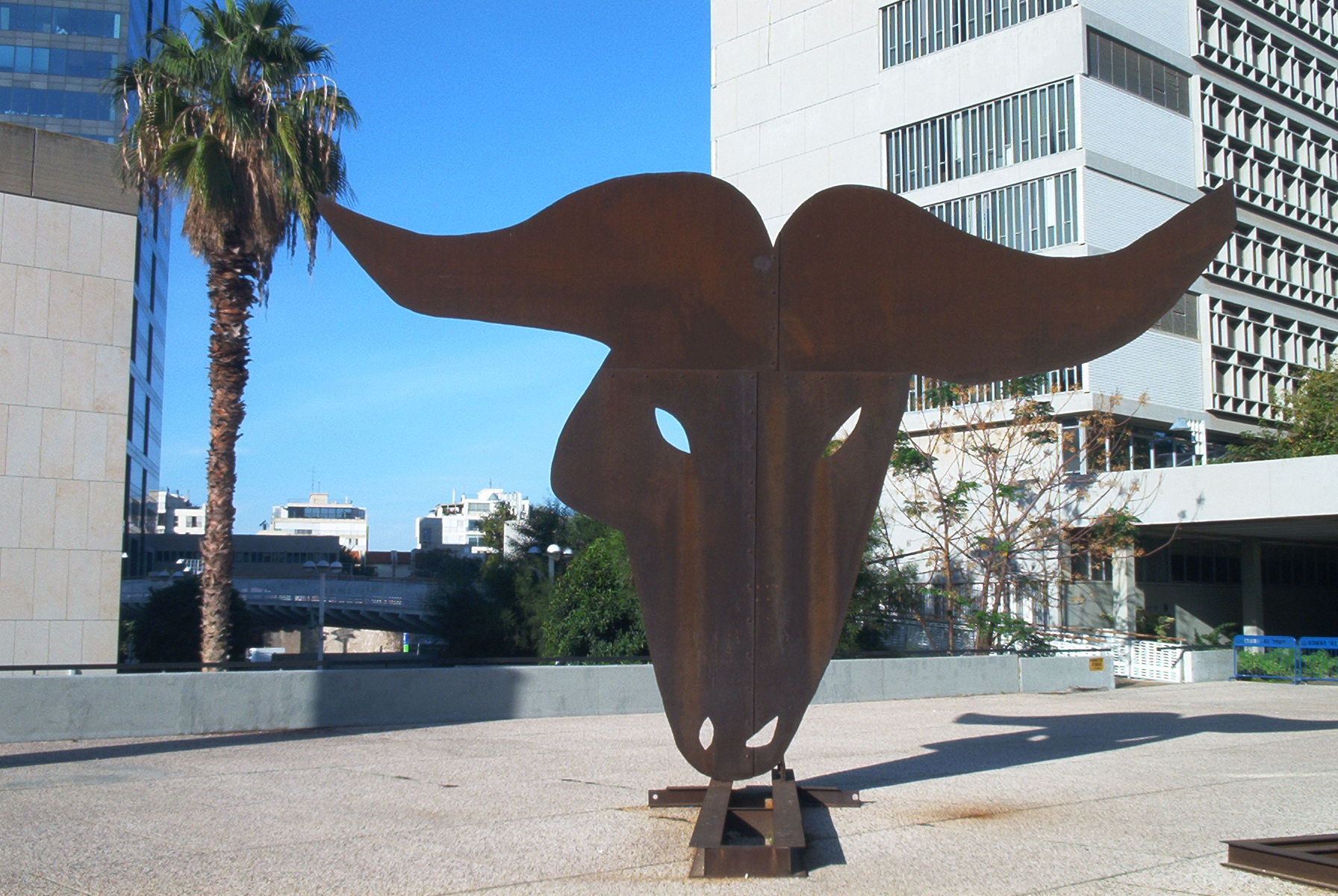
Menashe Kadishman's The binding of Yitzhak

New York

- 'Suspended', 1977, Storm King Art Center, Mountainville
- 'Eight Positive Trees', 1977, Storm King Art Center, Mountainville
- 'Sheep', 1979, The Jewish Museum, New York, NY
- 'Untitled', 1981, The Jewish Museum, New York, NY
- 'Shepherdess', 1984, The Jewish Museum, New York, NY
- 'The Sacrifice of Isaac', 1985, Hebrew Home at Riverdale, Bronx, NY

Oklahoma

- 'The Sacrifice of Isaac', 1985, Fred Jones Jr. Museum of Art, Norman
- 'Negative Tree', 2001, Philbrook Museum of Art, Tulsa
- 'Tree #1 (Positive)', 2001, Quartz Mountain Arts & Conference Center, Lone Wolf
- 'Tree #2 (Negative)', 2001, Quartz Mountain Arts & Conference Center, Lone Wolf

Pennsylvania

- 'Three Discs', 1967, Susquehanna University, Selinsgrove
- 'The Sacrifice of Isaac', 1986, Lehigh University, Bethlehem

Texas

- 'Segments', 1968, Nasher Sculpture Center, Dallas
- 'The Forest', 1970, Nasher Sculpture Center, Dallas
- 'Om', 1969, University of Houston, Houston

=== Canada ===
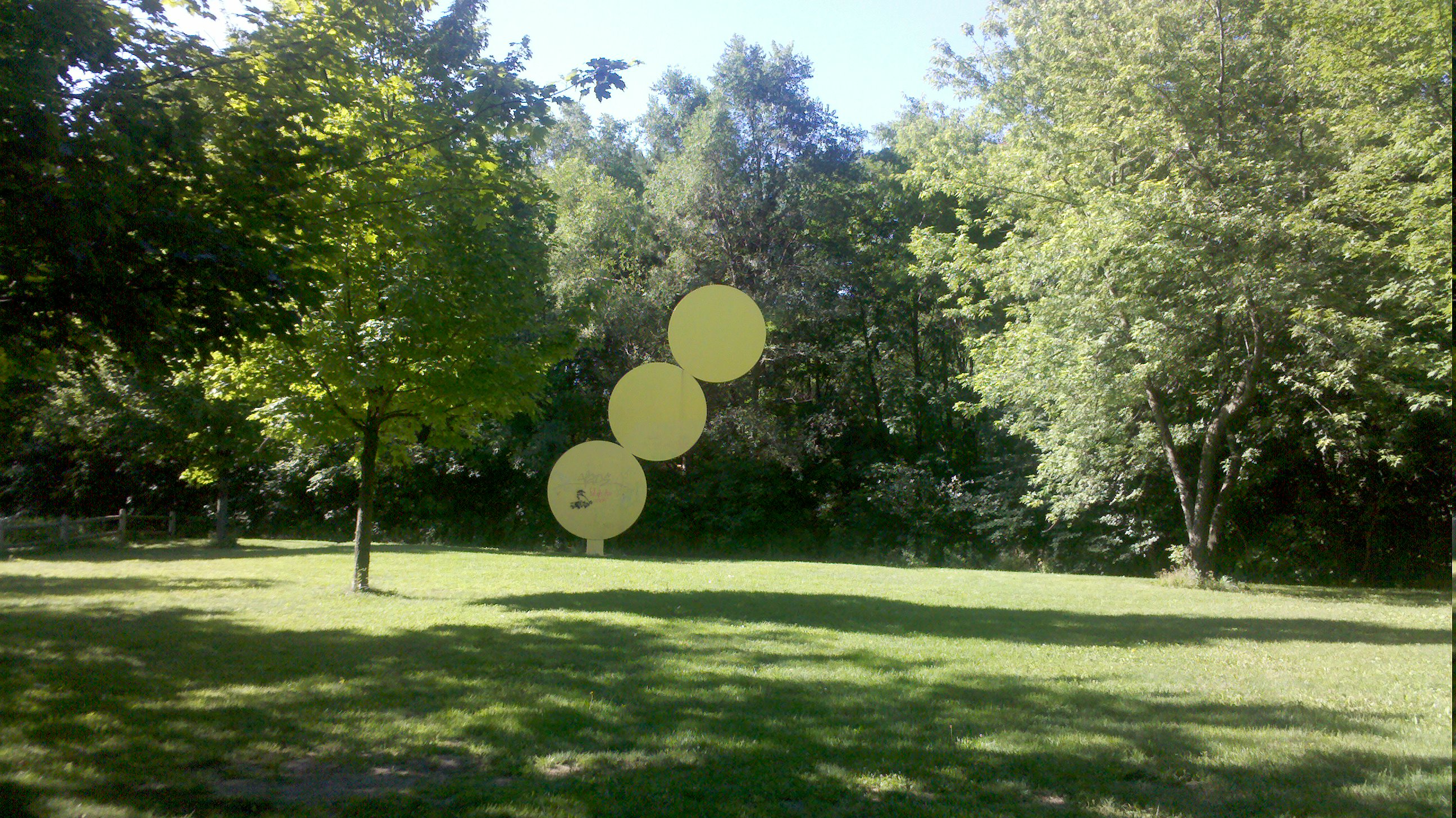
Menashe Kadishman's Three Discs, (1967) in High Park in Toronto, Ontario

- 'Three Discs', 1967, High Park, Toronto

=== Costa Rica ===
- MADC Museo de Arte y Diseño Contemporáneo, San José

=== Italy ===
- Morning Light (sheep+ sheep), Fattoria di Celle- Collezione Gori, Pistoia, Italy

=== Germany ===
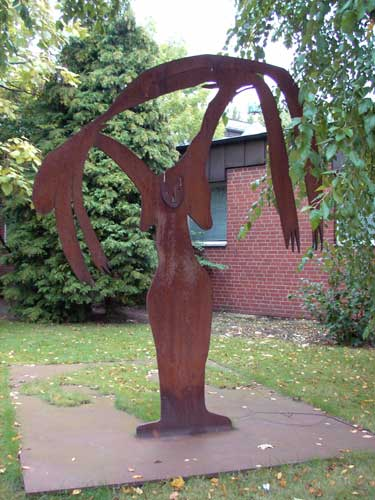
Piëta, Braunschweig

- 'Falling Leaves', Jewish Museum, Berlin
- 'Pieta', Dominikanerkloster, Braunschweig
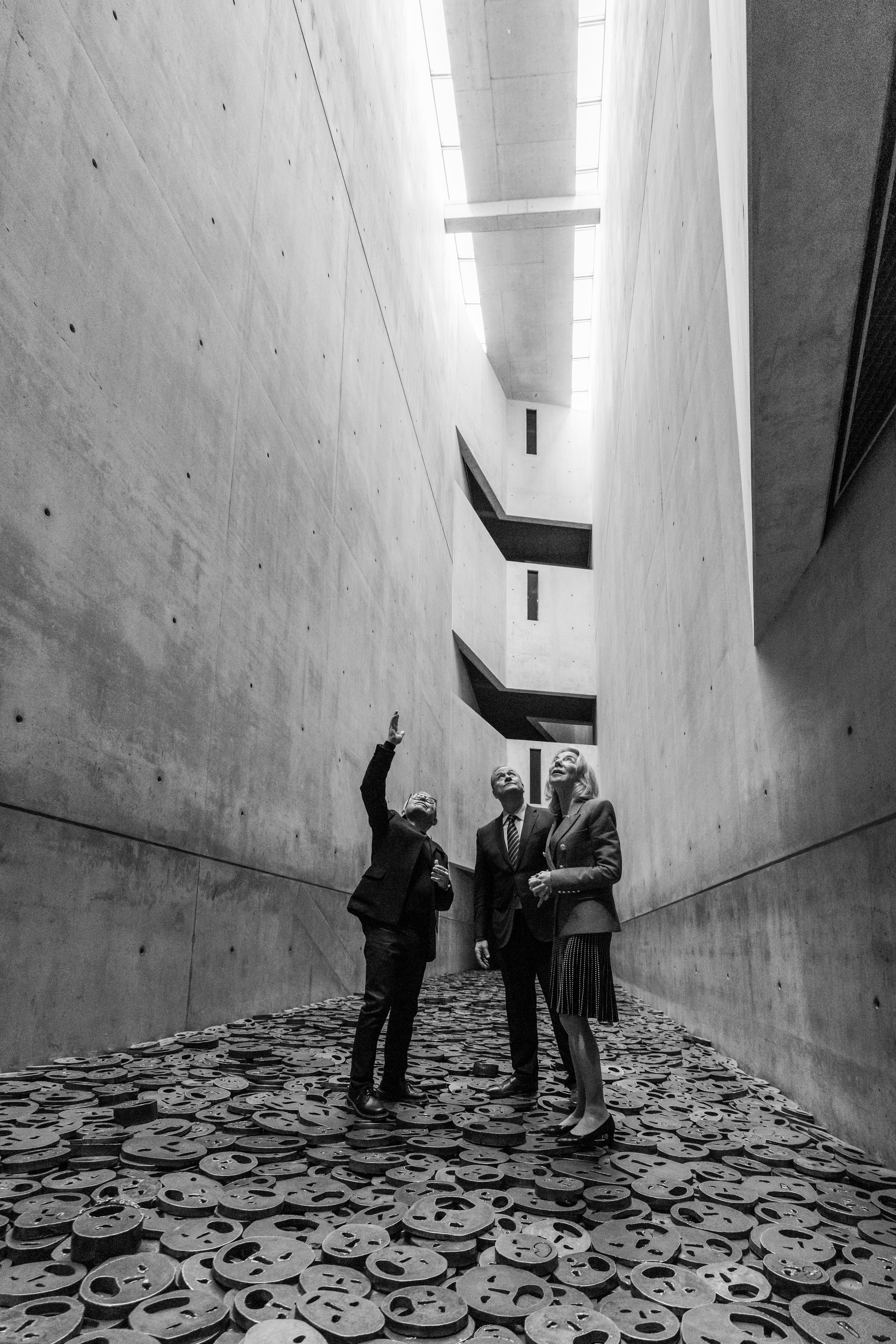
- A temporary exposition by Kadishman in the Jewish Museum in Berlin
  'Negative Trees', 1974, Wedau Sports Park, Duisburg

=== Israel ===
- 1957 "The Dog", Artist Private Collection | 2015 China, Sculptor Maty Grunberg, recreating Kadishman "The Dog 1957" in granite stone, under M. Kadishman's instruction
- 1960 Tension, Israel Museum, Jerusalem

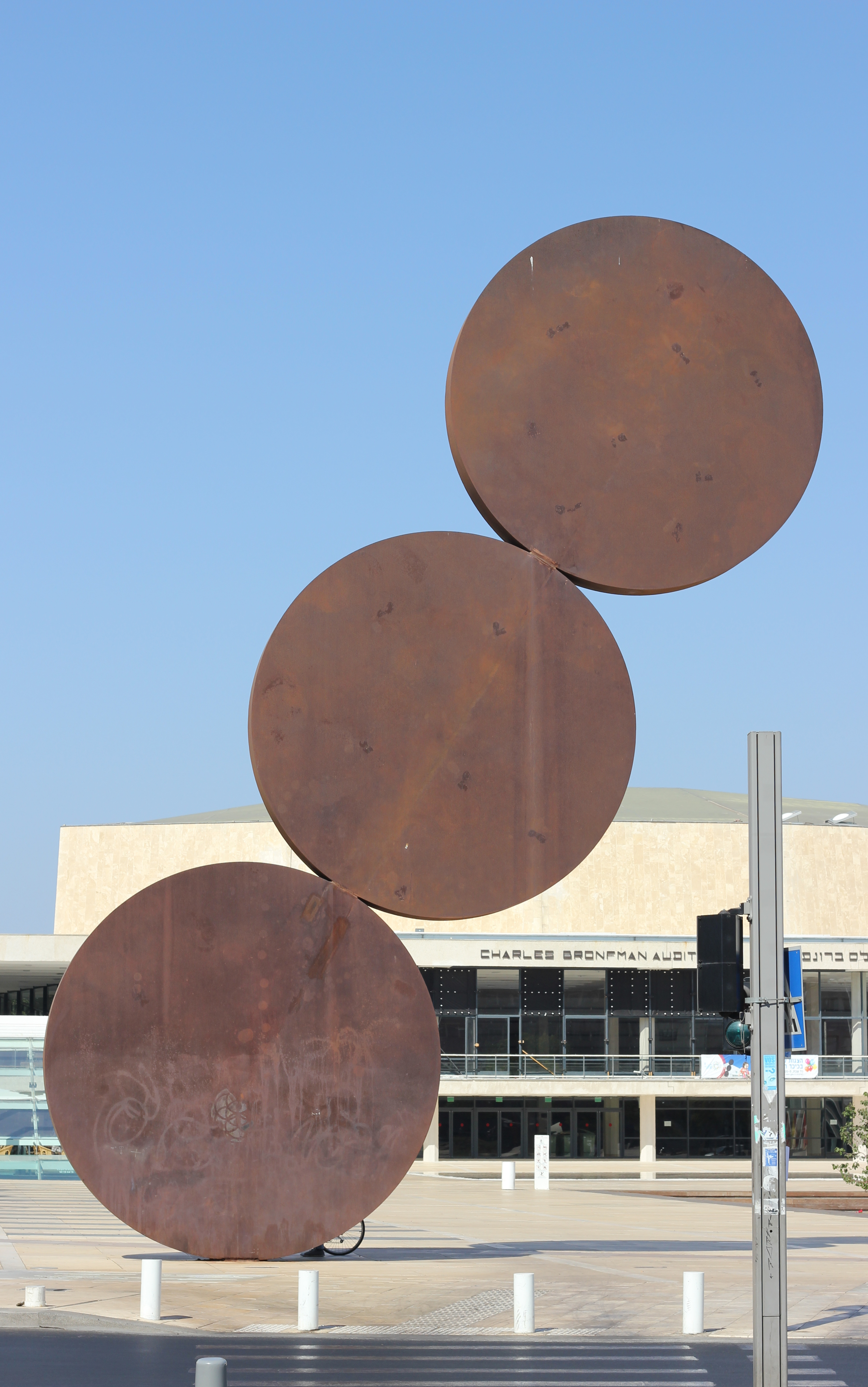
Uprise on Habima Square

- 1964 Uprise, a heavy steel sculpture near the Theatre and Performing Arts Center stage. Tel Aviv
- 1966 In Suspense, Israel Museum, Jerusalem
- 1967 In Suspense, Weizmann Institute of Science, Rehovot
- 1967-74 The Tree Circles, Tel Aviv
- 1975 In Suspense, University of Tel Aviv, Tel Aviv
- 1975 In Suspense, Tel Aviv Museum of Art, Tel Aviv-Yafo
- 1977 Circles, The Hebrew University, Har Hatsofim, Jerusalem
- 1979 Continuum, Weizmann Institute of Science, Rehovot
- 1982-1985 Akedat Issac, Tel Aviv Art Museum, Tel Aviv
- 1984 - Hill of the Sheep, The Tefen Open Museum of Israeli Art, Galilee
- 1985 Akedat Issac, University of Tel, Tel Aviv-Yafo
- 1985, Trees Israel Museum Billy Rose Sculpture Art Garden, Jerusalem, Israel
- 1989 Birth, The Open Museum of Israeli Art, Galilee
- 1990 Trees, Rehavia, Jerusalem
- 1990 Birth, near the Herzliya Museum of Contemporary Art. Herzliya
- 1994 Motherland, Lola Beer Ebner Sculpture Garden, Tel Aviv Museum of Art, Tel Aviv-Yafo
- 1995 The Family Plaza, The International School for Holocaust Studies, Yad Veshem, Jerusalem
- 1998 Scream, Lola Beer Ebner Sculpture Garden, Tel Aviv Museum of Art, Tel Aviv-Yafo
- 2004 Portrait of Shimon Finkel on the facade of Tel Aviv City Hall
- 2006 Memorial monument for the Etzel, Haganah and Lehi underground organizations, Ramat Gan

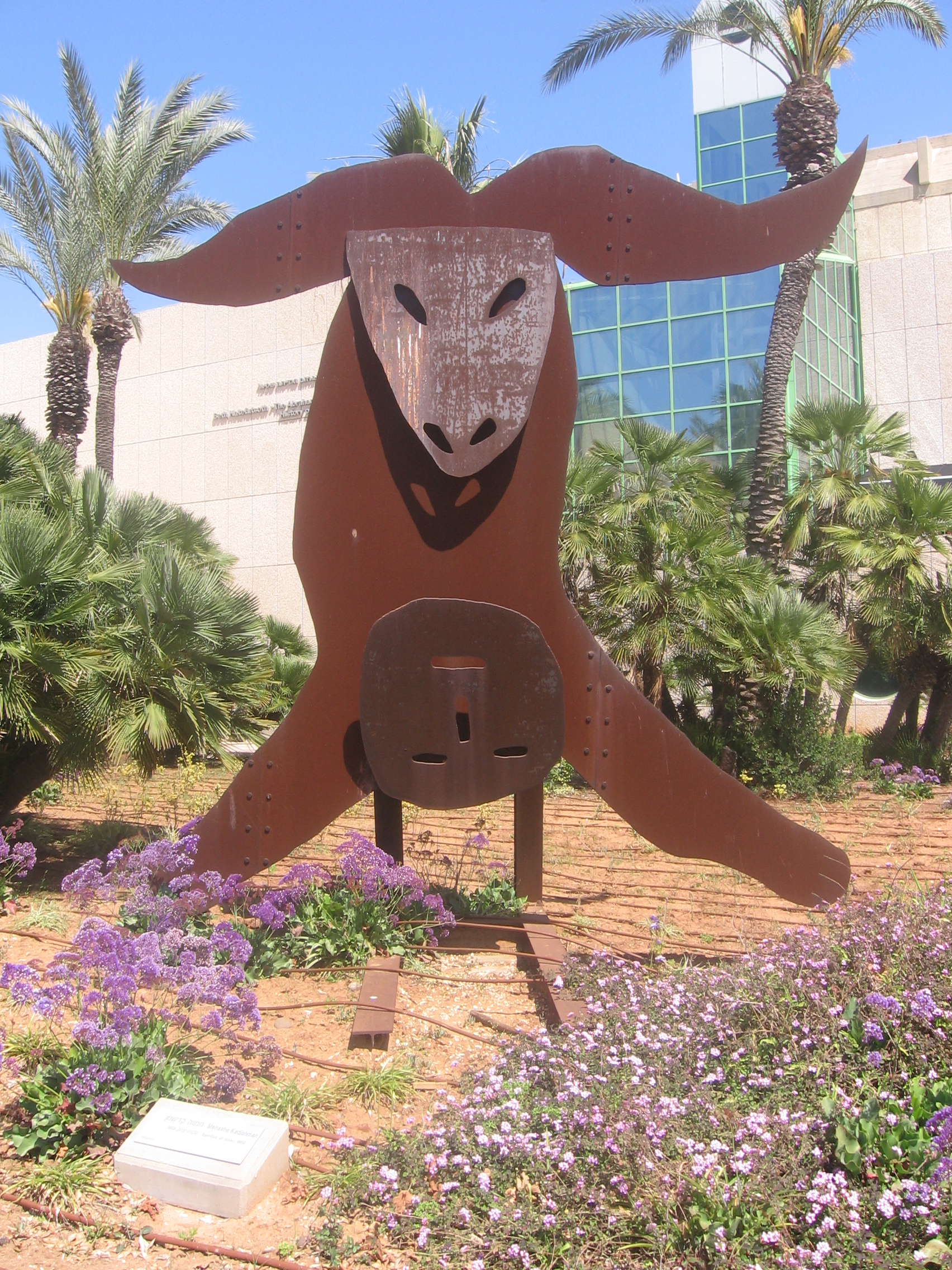
Binding of Isaac in Tel-Aviv University

=== Japan ===
- 'Prometheus', 1986–87, Hara Museum of Contemporary Art, Tokyo

=== The Netherlands ===
- 'Dream', 1993, Buddingh'plein, Dordrecht
- ‘Sacrifice of Isaac’, Emerparklaan, Breda.

=== United Kingdom ===
- Tate Britain, London (England)
- Hollyfield, Harlow (England)

== Private collections (selection) ==
- Herta & Paul Amir, Los Angeles, USA
- Lizi & Zeev Aram, London, UK
- Frank Cohen, London, UK
- Muriel & Phil Berman, Allentown, USA
- Irma & Norman Braman, Miami, USA
- Gabi & Ami Brown, Tel Aviv
- Nicki & Peter De Swan, Amsterdam, Holland
- Pina & Giuliano Gori, Villa Celle, Pistoia, Italy
- Rachel & Dov Gottesman, Te- Aviv, Israel
- Joseph Hackmey, Tel Aviv, Israel
- Ziva & Yoram Lazar, Nairobi, Kenya
- Rita & Simon Levit, Tulsa, USA
- Hans Mayer, Dusseldorf, Germany
- Nils Seethaler, Berlin, Germany
- Herbert Gerisch, Neumünster, Germany
- Romey & Adam Nan, Tel Aviv, Israel
- Patsy & Ray Nasher, Dallas, USA
- Sue Rowan Pittman, Bushnami Sculpture Garden, Burton, Texas, USA
- Teddy Reitman, London, England
- Sharon & Fred Stein, New York, USA
- Ellen & Jerome Stern, New York, USA
- Vera Silvia & Arturo Schwarz, Italy

== Other works ==
- 'Horse'
- 'Motherland'
- 'Child and Horse'
- 'Kissing Birds'
- 'Homage to Young Couples'
- 'Homage to Barnett Newman'
- 'The Flock'
- 'Cracked Earth'

== See also ==
- List of Israel Prize recipients
- Visual arts in Israel
