= Nathan Zach =

Israeli poet (1930–2020)

- נתן זך
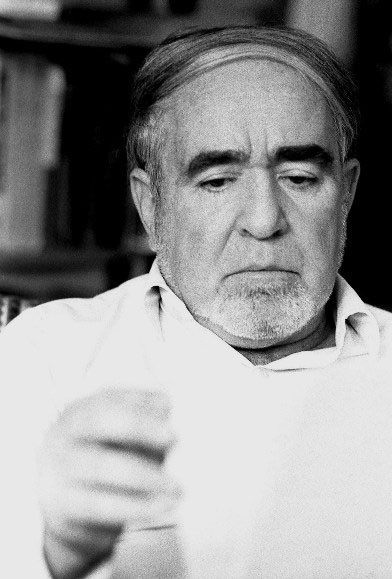
- Born: December 13, 1930; Berlin, Germany
- Died: November 6, 2020 (aged 89); Ramat Gan, Israel
- Occupation: Poet
- Writing career
- Language: Hebrew
- Notable awards: Bialik Prize; Feronia Prize; Israel Prize

Nathan Zach (Hebrew: נתן זך; 13 December 1930 – 6 November 2020) was an Israeli poet. Widely regarded as one of the preeminent poets in the country's history, he was awarded the Israel Prize in 1995 for poetry. He was also the recipient of other national and international awards. Zach was a professor of Hebrew and comparative literature at the University of Haifa.

== Biography ==
Born in Berlin to a German-Jewish officer and an Italian Catholic mother, the Seitelbach family fled to Mandatory Palestine in 1936 following the rise of the Nazi regime. The family settled in Haifa. He served in the Israel Defense Forces as an intelligence clerk during the 1948 Arab-Israeli War.

In 1955, he published his first collection of poetry (Shirim Rishonim, Hebrew: שירים ראשונים), and also translated numerous German plays for the Hebrew stage.

At the vanguard of a group of poets who began to publish after Israel's re-establishment, Zach has had a great influence on the development of modern Hebrew poetry as editor and critic, as well as translator and poet. Distinguishing him among the poets of the generation of the 1950s and 1960s is his poetic manifesto Zeman veRitmus etsel Bergson uvaShira haModernit [Time and Rhythm in Bergson and in Modern (Hebrew) Poetry]. Zach has been one of the most important innovators in Hebrew poetry since the 1950s, and he is well known in Israel also for his translations of the poetry of Else Lasker-Schüler and Allen Ginsberg. The literary scholar Nili Rachel Scharf Gold has pointed to Zach as an exemplar illustrating the role of "Mother Tongue" culture, in his case vis-a-vis German, on modern Hebrew literature.

Zach's essay, “Thoughts on Alterman’s Poetry,” which was published in the magazine Achshav (Now) in 1959 was an important manifesto for the rebellion of the Likrat (Towards) group against the lyrical pathos of the Zionist poets, as it included an unusual attack on Nathan Alterman, who was one of the most important and esteemed poets in the country. In the essay Zach decides upon new rules for poetry. The new rules that Zach presented were different from the rules of rhyme and meter which were customary in the nation’s poetry at the time.

From 1960 to 1967, Zach lectured in several institutes of higher education both in Tel Aviv and Haifa. From 1968 to 1979 he lived in England and completed his PhD at the University of Essex. After returning to Israel, he lectured at Tel Aviv University and was appointed professor at the University of Haifa. He has been chairman of the repertoire board of both the Ohel and Cameri theaters.

In his final years, Zach struggled with a worsening Alzheimer's disease, forcing him to reside in an assisted living facility. Zach died in November 2020, at age 89.

== Awards and critical acclaim ==
Internationally acclaimed, Zach has been called "the most articulate and insistent spokesman of the modernist movement in Hebrew poetry". He is one of the best known Israeli poets abroad.

- In 1982, Zach was awarded the Bialik Prize for literature.
- In 1993, he was awarded the Feronia Prize (Rome).
- In 1995, he was awarded the Israel Prize for Hebrew poetry.

== Controversy ==
In July 2010 Zach was interviewed on Israel's Channel 10 and accused Mizrahi Jews from Muslim countries of having an inferior culture to that of Jews from Europe; "The idea of taking people who have nothing in common arose. The one lot comes from the highest culture there is — Western European culture — and the other lot comes from the caves." The racist comments resulted in a petition to remove his work from the educational curriculum but it was denied. Zach later apologized.

== Published works ==
- At three (1953)
- First Poems (1955)
- Other Poems (1960)
- All the Milk and Honey (1966)
- Time and Rhythm in Bergson and in Modern Poetry (1966)
- Theatre of the Absurd (1971) - London, Artist Book, collaboration with artist Maty Grunberg
- Book of Esther (1975) - London, free translation, collaboration with artist Maty Grunberg
- Northeasterly (1979)
- Anti-erasure (1984)
- Dog and Bitch Poems (1990)
- Because I'm Around (1996)
- Death of My Mother (1997)
- Because Man is the Tree of the Field (1999)
- A story about the little people (2001)
- The Great Eagle (2001)
- The Bee Dvora (2001)
- The nightingale no longer lives here (2004)
- The Needle Monkey (2004)
- All the songs and new songs (2008)
- From year to year (2009)
- From the place where we were not to the place where we will not be (2013)
- They say it's really beautiful there (2016)

== See also ==
- List of Israel Prize recipients
- List of Bialik Prize recipients
