= Maty Grunberg =

Israeli sculptor

- מתי גרינברג
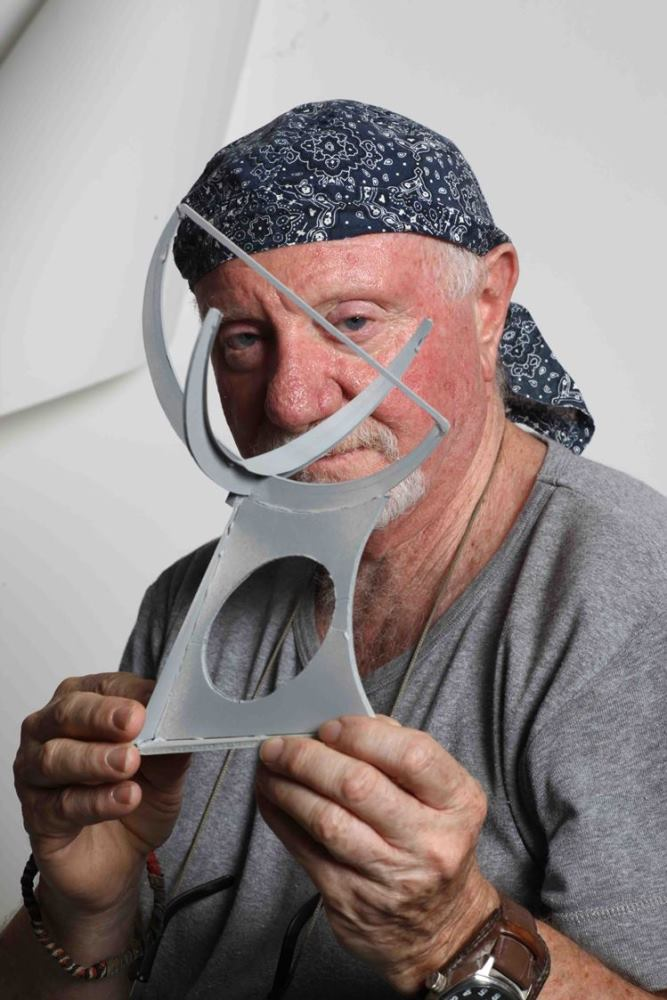
- Born: 1943 (age 82–83); Skopje, Yugoslavia
- Occupation: Sculptor
- Website: matygrunberg.com

Maty Grunberg (Hebrew: מתי גרינברג; born 1943), is an Israeli sculptor and known also for his Artist Books.

== Biography ==
Maty Grunberg was born in Skopje, Macedonia, the former Yugoslavia. In the year 1948 M.G. immigrated to Israel with his parents and sister "Liora". They were part of the remnants of Yugoslavian Jewry escaping from Europe. He grew up in Bat-yam, a small beach town south to Tel Aviv. His father, Leo, was an engineer and an inventor. His mother, Bella Kimchi, was a descendant of an old family coming from Toledo, Spain. M.G. finished "with honor" his studies in "Bezalel Academy of Arts and Design", Jerusalem (1964–66) and continued for his M.A. degree in "Central School of Art and Design" in London (1969–71). He lived and worked in London and New York for 44 years. In 2007, he came back to Israel and opened the Studio in Bat-yam. His 3 children – Allona is a Public Relation Manager, Bat-Ami is a drama teacher and David is an Architect.

== Environmental sculptures ==
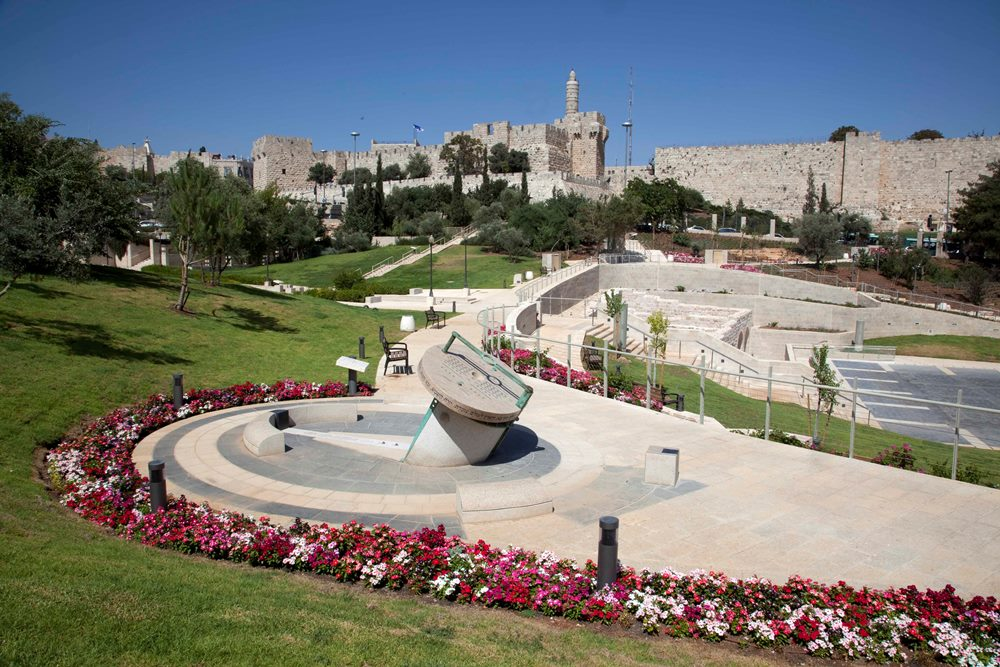
Sundial sculpture in Jerusalem

- 1985 – "The Jerusalem Gates" – M.G. has worked closely with architect Moshe Safdie and sculpted a series of 3 bronze gates for Hebrew Union College-Jewish Institute of Religion (HUC) Jerusalem. Also created for HUC a relief – "Menorah – The Tree of Life" and a relief – "Dove of Jerusalem".
- 1988 – "Menorah – Tree of Knowledge" façade of Hebrew Union College, (HUC) New-York, with architect Max Abramowitz.
- 1988 – "The Garden of Boca Raton", a series of bronze sculptures, Industrial Hi-Tech complex, Boca Raton, Florida.
- 1999 – "Sundial sculpture", bronze, private garden in Ascot, England
- 2000 – "Sundial sculpture", bronze, in front of the entrance of New-York Hall of Science.
- 2013 – "Sundial sculpture", stone and bronze, Teddy Park, Jerusalem.

== Artist books ==
Maty Grunberg created over 25 Artist Books in collaboration with some of the well-known writers. The books were done in different techniques that M.G. studied and specialized– 19th century etching, silk screens, woodcuts and Digi-graphic (21st century) prints. All were published in limited editions.

The most known of his artist books are:

- 1971 – "Theatre of the Absurd", etching, collaboration with distinguished Israeli poet Natan Zach, London.
- 1972 – Second Circle of Perception", etching, collaboration with playwright Arnold Wesker, London.
- 1990 – "Jerusalem 1967–1990", woodcuts, collaboration with late honorary Israeli poet Yehuda Amichai, London.
- 1996 – "The Book of Ruth", woodcuts, collaboration with Israeli poet Linda Zisquit, London.
- 2008 – "Jerusalem: The Tulip and the Thorn", digi-graphic prints, with extracts from Amos Oz, distinguished Israeli writer, book – "A Story of Love and Darkness", Jerusalem. 3 of M.G. artist books demonstrate a contemporary approach to Judaica.
- "The Book of Esther", silkscreen, collaboration with Israeli poet Natan Zach, 1975, London. Exhibition-Jewish Museum New-York, 1978.
- "The Bezalel Haggadah", woodcuts, 1984, New-York. Travelling exhibition – U.S.A. with Marc Chagall and Ben Shan Haggadah, 1989.
- "The Book of Ruth", woodcuts, collaboration with Israeli poet Linda Zisquit, 1996, London. Exhibition –Israel, Tel Aviv 2012, Ra'anana 2014. The 3 Judaica books will be exhibited together for the first time from March to June 2015, in the main gallery of Beit Ariella, central library of Tel Aviv.
- 2010 – 2014 A trilogy, 3 artist books with writer Naomi R. Azar, M.G's life partner.
  - "Writing the Month of August to You"
  - "The Remains of the Logical Woman"
  - "The Artist and the Bourgois Woman"
- 2012 "Bezalel Haggadah / Study Drawings" – An artist book following the creation of "Bezalel Haggadah" from preparation sketches to the final woodcuts in the printed Haggadah.
- 2013 – "The Book of Esther" – An artist book following the creation of "The Book of Esther" from preparation sketches to the final woodcuts in the printed book.
- 2016 – "Notes of Love", The trilogy of the 3 artist books was bound into a popular artist book.

== Dimensional Construction Paper Erosion ==
M.G. started to develop 3-dimensional paper sculptures during the seventies and goes on developing these works till today. Paper Erosion works were first exhibited in London in 1977 and in New-York in 1978 and last in Tel Aviv in 2012.

== Exhibitions, since 2012 ==
- "Erosions, Internal Time / External space", 2012, Artist House, Tel Aviv.
- "3D Paper works and Sundial Sculptures, 2012, "Vitrine Gallery", HIT, Holon Institute of Technology.
- "The Book of Ruth", 2012, Outdoor exhibition, Tel Aviv
- "The Book of Ruth", 2013, Outdoor exhibition, Ra'anana
- "Watershed Line / The Tulip and the Thorn", 2013, Department of Plant and Environmental Science, Weizmann Institute of Science.
- "One Haggadah, Two Scrolls, Three Cycles of Life", 2015, Beit Ariella Library", Tel Aviv.
- "Haunted Memories / Eyes on the Future", 2016, Skopje, Macedonia, Holocaust Museum
- "A special Recognition Award" Osten Gallery, Drawing biennale 2016, Skopje, Macedonia
- "Spectrum – Artists' Books and Others…" 2016, Tel Aviv, Artists' House

== Special project ==
2015 – "The Sculpture of Dog" – A special project, in honor of the late sculptor Menashe Kadishman who was a close friend of M.G (started when he was alive). Creating ten sculptures of dogs made of granite, based on a bronze sculpture Kadishman made "Dog 1957".
