= Carlene Hatcher Polite =

American novelist

- Born: Carlene Hatcher; August 28, 1932; Detroit, Michigan, United States
- Died: December 7, 2009 (aged 77); Cheektowaga, New York, United States
- Education: Martha Graham, Various universities in Farance
- Alma mater: Martha Graham Center of Contemporary Dance
- Occupations: Writer; teacher; dancer
- Spouse: James Patrick (2003–2009)
- Children: Lila
- Writing career
- Genre: African American Fiction
- Subjects: African American Experience and African American Women's Experience in Relationships
- Notable works: The Flagellants, Sister X

Carlene Hatcher Polite (August 28, 1932 – December 7, 2009) was an American writer.

== Early life ==
Carlene Hatcher trained at the Martha Graham Center of Contemporary Dance and then danced professionally from 1955 to 1963 in New York and Detroit. She also worked for civil rights organizations, including the Detroit Council for Human Rights and the NAACP.

== Writer ==
In 1964, Polite moved to Paris where her first book The Flagellants was published in French in 1966, and was subsequently published in English in 1967. The book received critical acclaim, with Mel Watkins in The New York Times Book Review stating it was "a complex, scathing and often brilliant depiction of the disintegration of a black couple’s relationship," and that it "was among the first fictional works by a black woman to focus directly on the theme of the sometimes bitter antagonism between black men and women."

Polite published her second book Sister X and the Victims of Foul Play, about the investigation into the death of a black nightclub dancer in Paris, in 1975.

== Later years ==
Polite joined the University at Buffalo in 1971, where she taught creative writing, African American history and literature until her retirement in 2000. She became tenured and served on committees, as well as chairing the American Studies Department for a short while.

Her classroom assignments often centered on books such as The African Origin of Civilization by Cheikh Anta Diop, Stolen Legacy by George G.M. James and other Afrocentric works.

Her writing assignments included four standard papers, one page each that served as mid-term and final papers—centering on being in love, falling out of love, and being the opposite gender. In her tenure at the university, she only used two teaching assistants (John Ransom and Kyle Phoenix (née Brian Kyle Doyle) both later published authors), feeling that their personal abilities, writing interests and knowledge were sufficient for her classroom needs.

She died December 7, 2009.

== Selected works ==
- Polite, Carlene Hatcher (1966). The Flagellants. Farrar, Straus & Giroux. ISBN 0-374-52656-7.
- Polite, Carlene Hatcher (1975). Sister X and the Victims of Foul Play. Farrar, Straus & Giroux. ISBN 0-374-26521-6.
