= Herzog family =

Jewish family

Herzog
- Political family
- Parent family: Israelites
- Current region: Israel
- Origin: Eastern Europe
- Titles: List: Ashkenazi Chief Rabbi of Israel; Ashkenazi Chief Rabbi of Mandatory Palestine; Chief Rabbi of Ireland; President of Israel (6 & 11); First Lady of Israel; Leader of the Opposition; Minister of Welfare and Social Services; Minister of Diaspora, Society and the Fight Against Antisemitism; Minister of Tourism; Minister of Housing and Construction; Member of the Knesset; Ambassadors of Israel (UN, USA, &Canada ); President of the International Council of Women; Vice President of the International Council of Women
- Members: List: Rabbi Yitzhak HaLevi Herzog; Rebbetzin Sarah Herzog; Chaim Herzog; Aura Herzog; Michael Herzog; Isaac Herzog; Michal Herzog; Yaakov Herzog; Pnina Herzog

The Herzog family is a Jewish family that includes the sixth and eleventh Presidents of Israel and the Chief Rabbi of Israel.

== Family tree ==
Some of the family members include:

- Joel Leib Herzog
  - Rabbi Yitzhak HaLevi Herzog (1888−1959). Married to Sarah Hillman (1896–1979)
    - Chaim Herzog (1918–1997). Married to Aura Ambache (1924–2022).
      - Michael Herzog (born 1952).
      - Isaac Herzog (born 1960). Married to Michal Afek (born 1962)
    - Yaakov Herzog (1921–1972). Married to Pnina Shachor (1925/1926–2005)
    - Suzy Herzog. Married to Abba Eban (1915–2002)
      - Eli Eban (born 1950)
