= Pnina Herzog =

Israeli pharmacist

Pnina Herzog (Hebrew: פנינה הרצוג; 1925/1926 - January 21, 2005) was an Israeli pharmacist and public health official.

== Biography ==
She was the daughter of Zalman and Frieda Shachor, who had been both living in Palestine in the 1940s. In 1946, she graduated from school and began studying pharmacy in Manchester. Later, she would also study at universities in Ottawa and Washington, D.C. She acquired a Ph.D.

On February 14, 1952, she married Yaakov Herzog with whom she had been acquainted since childhood. Rabbi Yitzhak HaLevi Herzog, his father, conducted the ceremony. Yaakov Herzog was a diplomat and ambassador of Israel in Canada between 1960 and 1963. The couple hat three children: Shira (born 1953), Eliezra (1955) and Yitzhak (1967). Her husband died in 1972. Chaim Herzog, from 1983 to 1993 President of Israel, was Pnina Herzog's brother-in-law; the politician Isaac Herzog is a nephew.

From 1964 onwards, Pnina Herzog found occupation in the Israeli public health branch; first as a pharmacist in charge of registration of new drugs. She was deputy head and later acting head of the department of clinical pharmacology between 1972 and 1984, and was also in the advisory committee for the approval of clinical trials. That position also saw her as a member to the advisory group to the World Health Organization (WHO) in 1983 and 1984 regarding the international collaborating scheme on adverse drug reactions. In the WHO, she was member of the executive board from 1993 to 1996, where she became vice chairperson in 1994. She represented the executive board on the 49th WHO assembly in 1996.

She was also a women's activist and served between 1988 and 1994 as vice president in the International Council of Women (ICW). After a break due to her work for the WHO, she then served for two terms as president of the ICW between 1997 and 2003.

Her professed hobbies were painting and the piano.
