= Thirty-seventh government of Israel and the Palestinians =

Israeli government coalition (2022–present)

The Israeli government’s Coalition Agreement of December 1, 2022 between incoming prime minister Benjamin Netanyahu's Likud party and the far-right, ultra-nationalist Religious Zionism party of Bezalel Smotrich states that "the prime minister will work towards the formulation and promotion of a policy whereby sovereignty is applied to Judea and Samaria" (biblical names for the occupied West Bank). Smotrich would take up a new post of minister within the defense ministry, where he would oversee civil matters in the West Bank. Other commitments included legalization of dozens of unauthorized settlements and the provision of large funds for road building and public transport in the West Bank.

== Coalition policies ==
=== Civilian control of the West Bank ===
On 23 February 2023, Defense Minister Gallant signed an agreement assigning governmental powers in the West Bank to a body to be headed by Smotrich, who will effectively become the governor of the West Bank, controlling almost all areas of life in the area, including planning, building and infrastructure.

This administrative change equates to declaring Israeli sovereignty over the West Bank, a violation of the UN Charter's prohibition against territorial conquest. An editorial in Haaretz noted that the assignment of governmental powers in the West Bank to a civilian governor, alongside the plan to expand the dual justice system so that Israeli law will apply fully to settlers in the West Bank, constitutes de jure annexation of the West Bank.

In March 2023, a position paper by the Israeli Law Professors' Forum for Democracy, a group of 120 Israeli law professors, stated that recent changes introduced by the Netanyahu government "validate the claim that Israel practices apartheid". The group argued that the transfer of responsibility to civilian hands is a violation of international law and specifically the 1907 Hague Regulations.

=== Settlement policy ===
In its first six months, construction of 13,000 housing units in settlements, almost triple the amount advanced in the whole of 2022.

In a CNN interview on 9 July 2023, US President Joe Biden said that extreme cabinet ministers in the coalition that back settling "anywhere they want" in the West Bank are "part of the problem" in the conflict.

==== Resettlement of illegal settlements evacuated in 2005 ====
A proposal to amend the Disengagement Law allowing Israelis to resettle illegal settlements vacated during the 2005 Israeli disengagement from Gaza and the northern West Bank was passed on 21 March. The US requested clarification from Israeli ambassador Michael Herzog. A US State Department spokesman stated that "The U.S. strongly urges Israel to refrain from allowing the return of settlers to the area covered by the legislation, consistent with both former Prime Minister Sharon and the current Israeli Government's commitment to the United States," noting that the actions represent a clear violation of undertakings given by the Sharon government to the Bush administration in 2005 and Netanyahu's far-right coalition to the Biden administration the previous week.

==== Legalization of outposts ====
It has also approved the legalisation of nine settlement outposts that even Israel previously regarded as illegal.

Daniel Kurtzer, former US ambassador to Israel, accused the government of breaking a written agreement with Washington by legalising a "group of hardline nationalist and religious settlements" and called on the Biden administration to prevent Israel's "creeping annexation" of the West Bank.
