= Michael Herzog (ambassador) =

Israeli ambassador (born 1952)

- מיכאל הרצוג
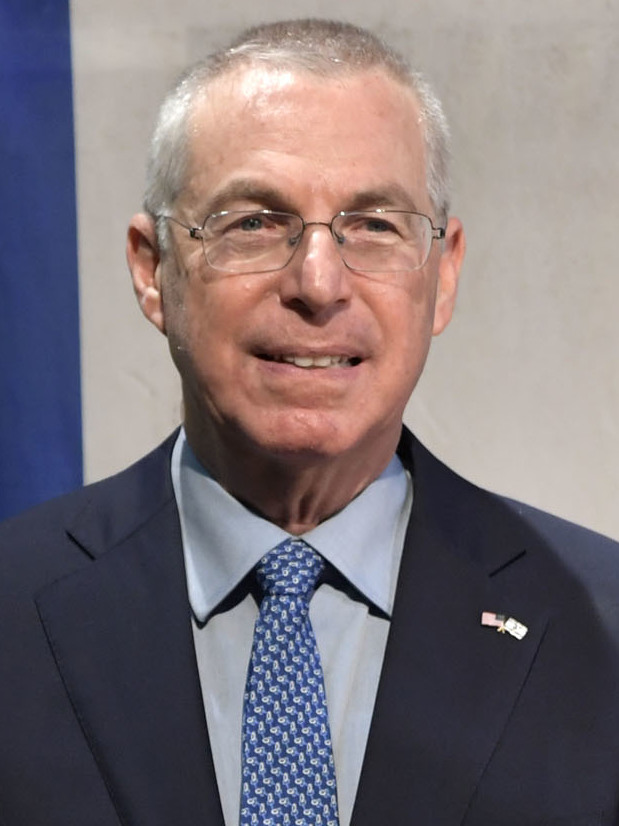
- Herzog in 2021

Israeli Ambassador to the United States
- In office November 15, 2021 – January 24, 2025
- Prime Minister: Naftali Bennett; Yair Lapid; Benjamin Netanyahu
- Preceded by: Gilad Erdan
- Succeeded by: Yechiel Leiter

Personal details
- Born: Michael Herzog; July 15, 1952 (age 74) Israel
- Spouse: Shirin Herzog
- Children: 2
- Parents: Chaim Herzog (father); Aura Herzog (mother)
- Relatives: Herzog family
- Education: Hebrew University of Jerusalem; University of Haifa; National Security College

Michael Herzog (Hebrew: מיכאל (מייק) הרצוג; born July 15, 1952) is an Israeli retired brigadier general in the Israeli Defense Forces who was the Israeli Ambassador to the United States from November 2021 to January 2025. He is the son of Chaim Herzog, the sixth president of Israel, and brother of Isaac Herzog, the 11th president of Israel.

== Biography ==
Michael (Mike) Herzog is the son of Chaim Herzog, the sixth President of Israel. Herzog's mother was Aura Herzog. His paternal grandfather was Yitzhak HaLevi Herzog, the chief rabbi of both Ireland and Israel. His uncle, Yaakov Herzog, served as Israel's ambassador to Canada. His younger brother, Isaac Herzog, is the eleventh President of Israel.

Herzog is married to Shirin Herzog (née Halperin), an attorney, with whom he has two children.

== Military career ==
Herzog served as a brigadier general in the Israel Defense Forces. He was the military secretary for both Shaul Mofaz and Ehud Barak when they served as defense ministers.

== Non-military career ==
A researcher in the field of Israeli-Middle East relations, Herzog has been a fellow at the Washington Institute for Near East Policy think tank as a distinguished fellow and participated in multiple iterations of peace talks between Israel and Palestinians including Wye Plantation, Camp David, Taba, Annapolis and the 2013-2014 negotiations. In 2021, he was appointed as Ambassador to the U.S. by Prime Minister of Israel Naftali Bennett, replacing Gilad Erdan. Erdan previously was Israeli Ambassador to the U.S. as well as Ambassador to the United Nations, and continued to hold the UN role after Herzog replaced him as representative to the U.S.
