= Herzog (disambiguation) =

Herzog is a German title of nobility.

Herzog may also refer to:

- Herzog (surname), including a list of persons with the surname
- USS Herzog, the name of more than one United States Navy ship
- Herzog (novel), a novel by Saul Bellow
- Herzog (video game), a strategy video game by TechnoSoft
- Herzog (band), an American indie rock band
- Herzog Film, a West German film distribution company
- Herzog Wine Cellars, a kosher winery in Oxnard, California
- Herzog Mountains, Papua New Guinea
- Herzog Hospital, a psycho-geriatric hospital in Israel
- Herzog, a township in Ellis County, Kansas
- Herzog, a Volga-German settlement renamed Victoria, Kansas, in 1913
