= Isaac Herzog =

President of Israel since 2021

- יִצְחָק הֶרְצוֹג
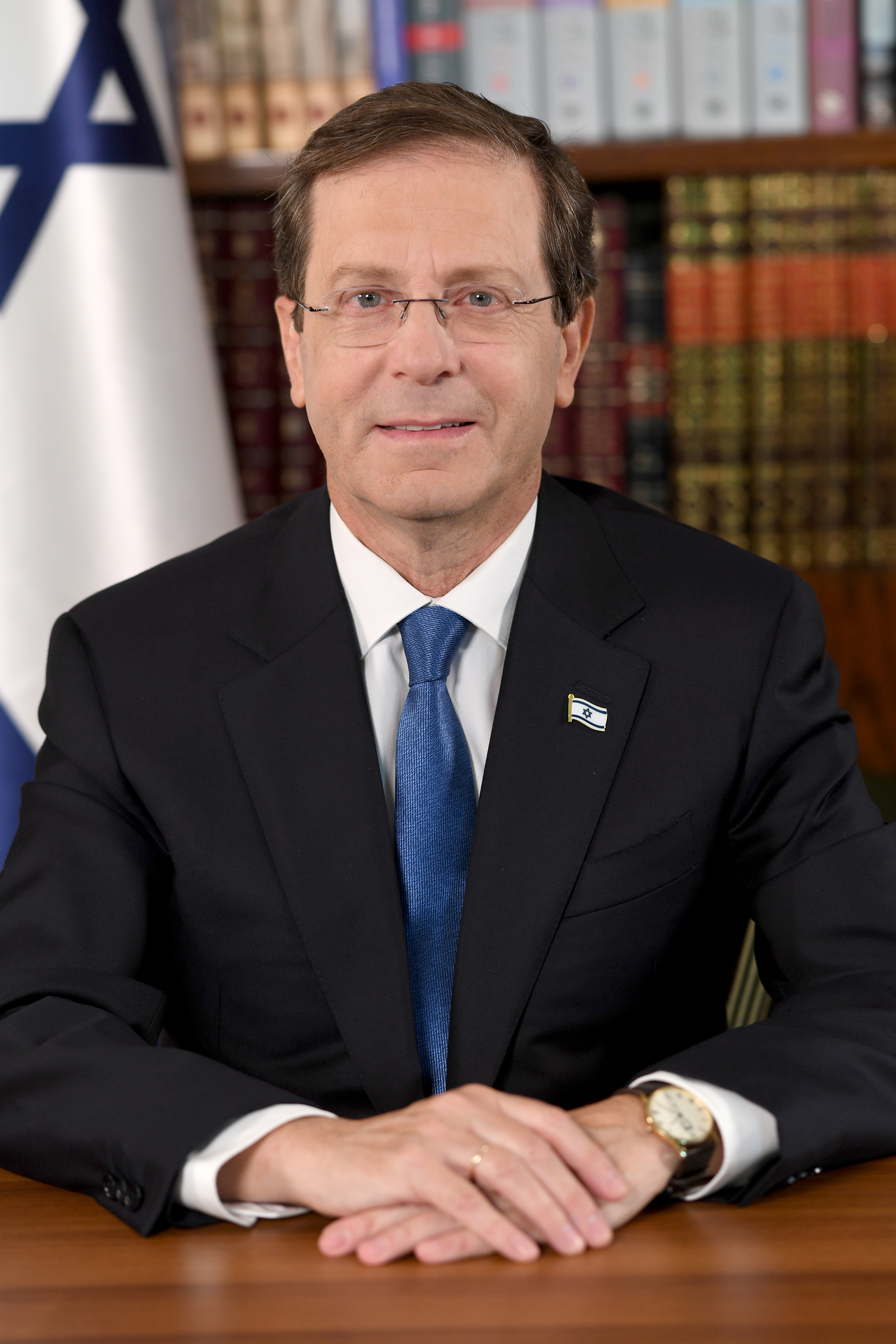
- Official portrait, 2021

11th President of Israel
- Incumbent
- Assumed office 7 July 2021
- Prime Minister: Naftali Bennett; Yair Lapid; Benjamin Netanyahu
- Preceded by: Reuven Rivlin

Leader of the Opposition
- In office 25 November 2013 – 31 July 2018
- Prime Minister: Benjamin Netanyahu
- Preceded by: Shelly Yachimovich
- Succeeded by: Tzipi Livni
Ministerial positions
Minister of Welfare and Social Services
In office 21 March 2007 – 17 January 2011
| Prime Minister | Ehud Olmert; Benjamin Netanyahu |
| Preceded by | Ehud Olmert |
| Succeeded by | Moshe Kahlon |
Minister of Diaspora, Society and the Fight Against Antisemitism
In office 21 March 2007 – 31 March 2009
| Prime Minister | Ehud Olmert |
| Preceded by | Natan Sharansky |
| Succeeded by | Yuli-Yoel Edelstein |
Minister of Tourism
In office 4 May 2006 – 21 March 2007
| Prime Minister | Ehud Olmert |
| Preceded by | Avraham Hirschson |
| Succeeded by | Yitzhak Aharonovich |
Minister of Housing and Construction
In office 10 January 2005 – 23 November 2005
| Prime Minister | Ariel Sharon |
| Preceded by | Tzipi Livni |
| Succeeded by | Ze'ev Boim |

Member of the Knesset
- In office 17 February 2003 – 31 July 2018

Personal details
- Born: 22 September 1960 (age 66) Tel Aviv, Israel
- Party: The Democrats (since 2024)
- Other political affiliations: Labor (until 2024); Zionist Union (2015–2018)
- Spouse: Michal Afek (m. 1985)
- Children: 3
- Parents: Chaim Herzog (father); Aura Ambache (mother)
- Relatives: Michael Herzog (ambassador); Herzog family
- Education: Cornell University; New York University; Tel Aviv University
- Nicknames: Buji; Bougie

Military service
- Branch/service: Israel Defense Forces
- Years of service: 1978
- Rank: Rav séren (Major)
- Unit: Unit 8200

Isaac Herzog (Hebrew: יִצְחָק הֶרְצוֹג, romanized: Yitskhak Hertsog; born 22 September 1960), also known as Buji, is an Israeli politician who has served as the president of Israel since 2021.

Son of former Israeli president Chaim Herzog, he is a lawyer by profession and had served as Cabinet Secretary from 1999 to 2001. He was a member of the Knesset from 2003 to 2018. He held several ministerial posts between 2005 and 2011, including serving as Minister of Welfare and Social Services from 2007 to 2011 under prime ministers Ehud Olmert and Benjamin Netanyahu.

Herzog was the leader of the Labor Party (2013–2017) and of the Zionist Union alliance (2014–2018). He served as Leader of the Opposition from 2013 to 2018 and was the Labor Party candidate for prime minister during the 2015 Israeli legislative election. Herzog was elected in the 2021 Israeli presidential election and was inaugurated on 7 July 2021. He is the first son of an Israeli president to become president himself, and is the first president to have been born in Israel after its Declaration of Independence.

== Early life and education ==
Isaac Herzog was born in Tel Aviv on 22 September 1960. He is the son of Major-General Chaim Herzog, who served two terms as the sixth president of Israel from 1983 to 1993, and Aura Ambache, founder of the Council for a Beautiful Israel. As a child, he was given the nickname Bougie from his mother and it has stuck with him since. Herzog's father was born and raised in Ireland and his mother was born in Egypt; their families were of Eastern European Jewish descent (from Poland, Russia, and Lithuania). He has two brothers and a sister. His paternal grandfather, Rabbi Yitzhak HaLevi Herzog, was the first chief rabbi of Ireland, a post he held from 1922 to 1935, and Ashkenazi Chief Rabbi of Israel from 1936 to 1959. The third foreign minister of Israel, Abba Eban, was his uncle.

When his father served as permanent representative of Israel to the United Nations for three years, Herzog lived in New York City and attended the Ramaz School. In the following years, while also studying in high school, Herzog gained an advanced academic education at Cornell University and New York University and spent a summer at Camp Ramah. He also accompanied his father to visit the Lubavitcher Rebbe in Brooklyn.

When he returned to Israel at the end of 1978, he enlisted in the Israel Defense Forces (IDF) and served in Unit 8200 of the Israeli Intelligence Corps. He completed his army service with the rank of major (res.). Herzog studied law at Tel Aviv University. He was a partner at the law firm founded by his father, Herzog, Fox & Ne'eman.

== Career ==
Herzog served as the secretary of the government in Ehud Barak's cabinet from 1999 until 2001, when Barak was defeated by Ariel Sharon in a special election for prime minister. In 1999, he was also investigated in the "Amutot Barak" scandal, involving allegations that the party funding law was violated, but maintained his silence. The Attorney General, therefore, decided to close the case against him due to lack of evidence. From 2000 until 2003, he served as chairman of the Israel Anti-Drug Authority.

Herzog won a seat in the 2003 election as a member of the Labor Party and was appointed Minister of Housing and Construction at his request when Labor joined Ariel Sharon's coalition government on 10 January 2005. However, on 23 November 2005, he resigned from his cabinet post along with the rest of the party. Prior to the 2006 elections, Herzog topped the vote in the primaries but took second spot as the top one is reserved for the party leader. He was initially appointed Minister of Tourism in Ehud Olmert's Kadima-led coalition but was reassigned to the Social Affairs ministry in March 2007 after Yisrael Beiteinu was awarded the Tourism Ministry following their late entry to the governing coalition, and was also appointed Minister of the Diaspora, Society and the Fight Against Antisemitism. Once again he topped the primary vote, this time for the 2009 elections. Following the election, he was appointed Minister of Welfare and Social Services and Minister of the Diaspora and was reappointed after the 2011 election. In January 2009 during Operation Cast Lead he was appointed by PM Ehud Olmert as the Israel Government Coordinator for the provision of humanitarian aid to the population of Gaza. He later resigned from the cabinet after Ehud Barak left the Labor Party to establish Independence in January 2011.

In 2011 Herzog was an unsuccessful candidate for the Labor Party leadership. He finished third in the primaries that year after Shelly Yachimovich and Amir Peretz.

=== Opposition leader ===
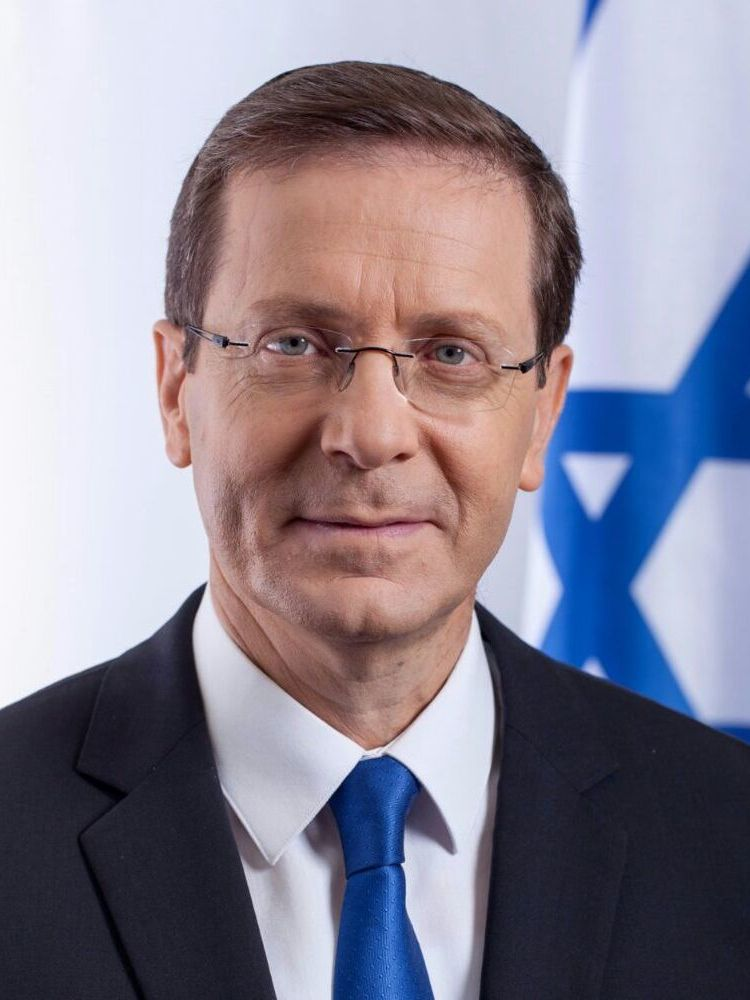
Official portrait, 2016

On 22 November 2013, Herzog was elected leader of the Labor Party, defeating incumbent Shelly Yachimovich by 58.5% to 41.5%. In doing so, he became Leader of the Opposition. Whereas Yachimovich focused first on socioeconomic issues, Herzog prioritizes security and resolution of the Israeli–Palestinian conflict. Ten days after the election, Herzog met with Palestinian President Mahmoud Abbas to pledge his support for the two-state solution.

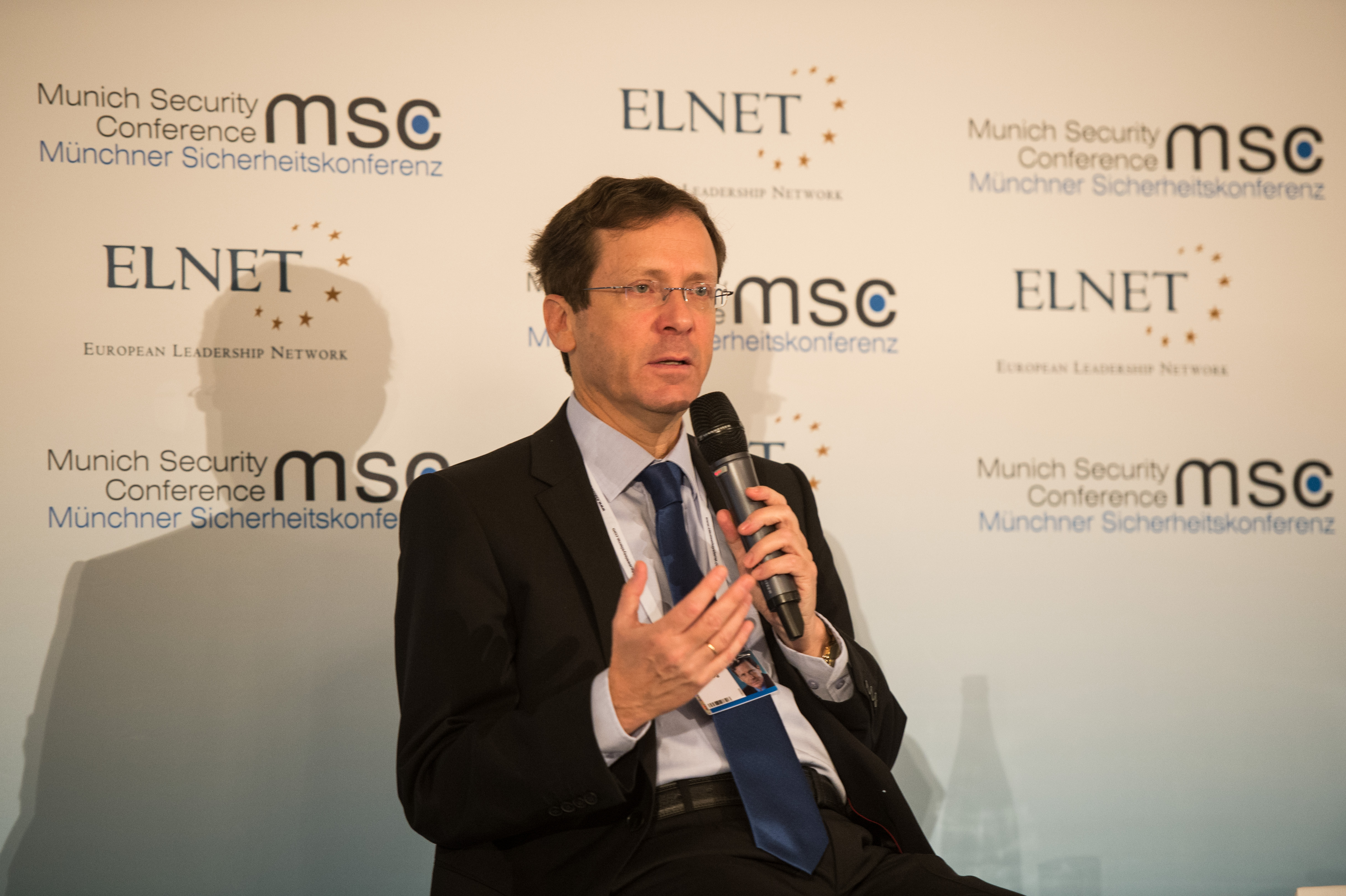
Herzog speaking at the Munich Security Conference, 2015

Presidential styles of Isaac Herzog
- Reference style: His Excellency, The Honorable כבוד הנשיא
- Spoken style: Your Excellency, Honorable President כבוד הנשיא
- Alternative style: Mr. President אדוני הנשיא

Herzog reportedly reached out to Shas leader Aryeh Deri to increase cooperation between the two opposition factions.

In June 2014, Herzog criticised PM Benjamin Netanyahu for failing to engage the international community, failing to present a proposal for peace with Palestinians, and failure to work effectively with the President of the United States, Barack Obama. Herzog declared that Netanyahu's "loathing and hostility for Barack Obama" was one of his greatest failures, since it put Israel's security at risk. In December 2014, Herzog and Tzipi Livni, who was justice minister and is head of a centrist faction, announced they would campaign on a joint slate in the upcoming election in an effort to keep Netanyahu, leader of the Likud Party, from securing a fourth term as prime minister. The joint list was named Zionist Union, winning 24 seats to Likud's 30 in the 2015 election, making it the largest Opposition faction.

In July 2017, Herzog lost in the first round of the Labor Party leadership vote. Avi Gabbay went on to win the leadership elections; however, Herzog remained official leader of the opposition in the Knesset as Gabay was not an elected MK. After being elected chairman of the Jewish Agency for Israel, Herzog resigned as Leader of the Opposition and from the Knesset. Tzipi Livni succeeded him as Leader of the Opposition, whilst Robert Tiviaev replaced him in the Knesset.

=== Chairman of the Jewish Agency ===
In June 2018, Herzog was unanimously elected chairman of the Jewish Agency for Israel. Herzog marked bridging the gap between the Jewish people and the State of Israel as one of his objectives. On 24 October 2018, Herzog led a resolution to reaffirm the Jewish Agency's Board of Governors' commitment to the principles of a democratic Israel as emerging from the Declaration of Independence.

Following the Pittsburgh synagogue shooting, Herzog expressed his concern from the rising anti-Semitism all over the world. In the International Holocaust Remembrance Day ceremony at the European Parliament in Brussels he urged the leaders of European countries to fight anti-Semitism and to adopt the International Holocaust Remembrance Alliance's definition of anti-Semitism. In March 2019, the Jewish Agency became the first public institution in Israel to help employees finance surrogacy services abroad so that they can become parents (this includes gay and single parents).

== President of Israel ==
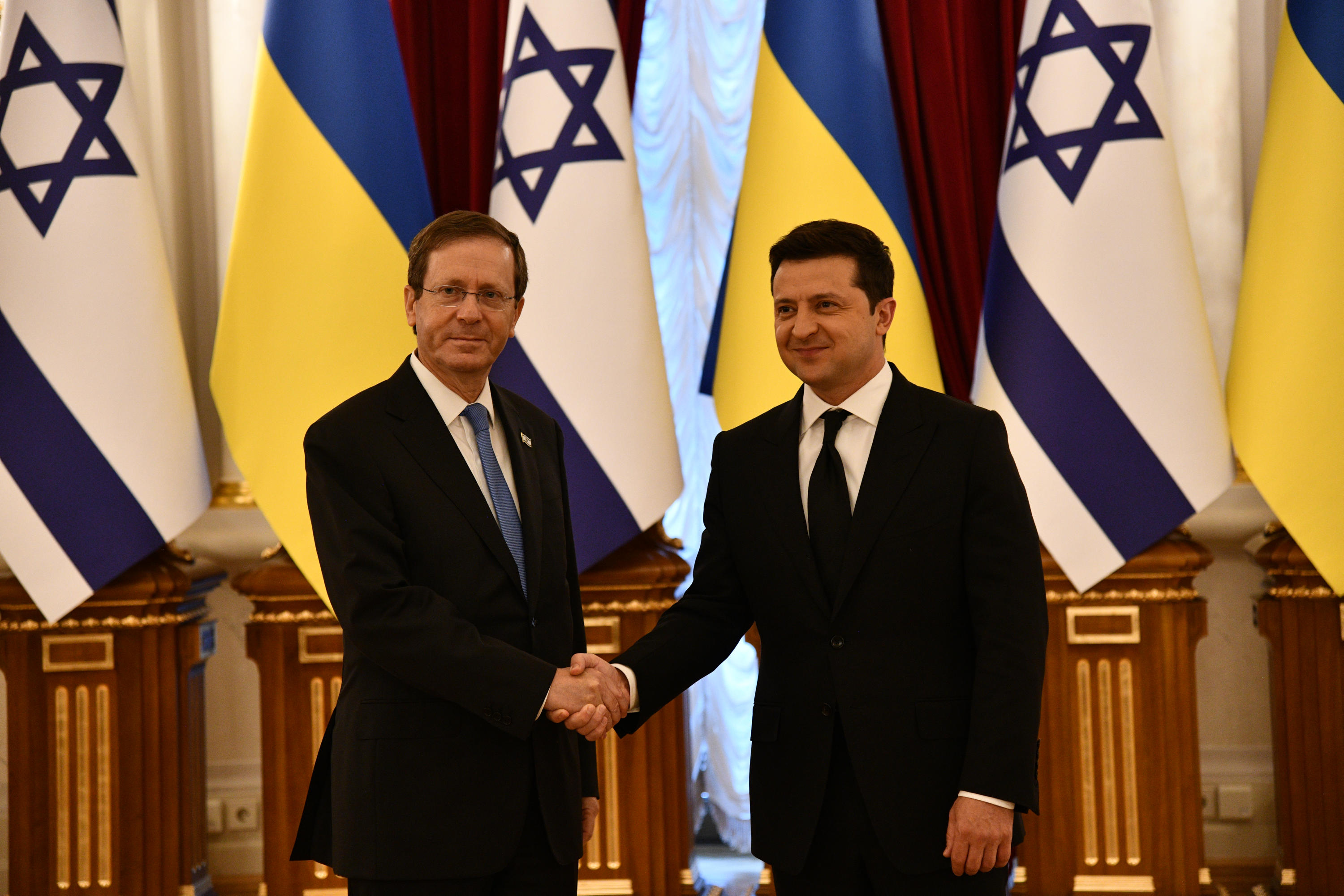
Herzog with Ukrainian President Volodymyr Zelenskyy in Kyiv, Ukraine, October 2021

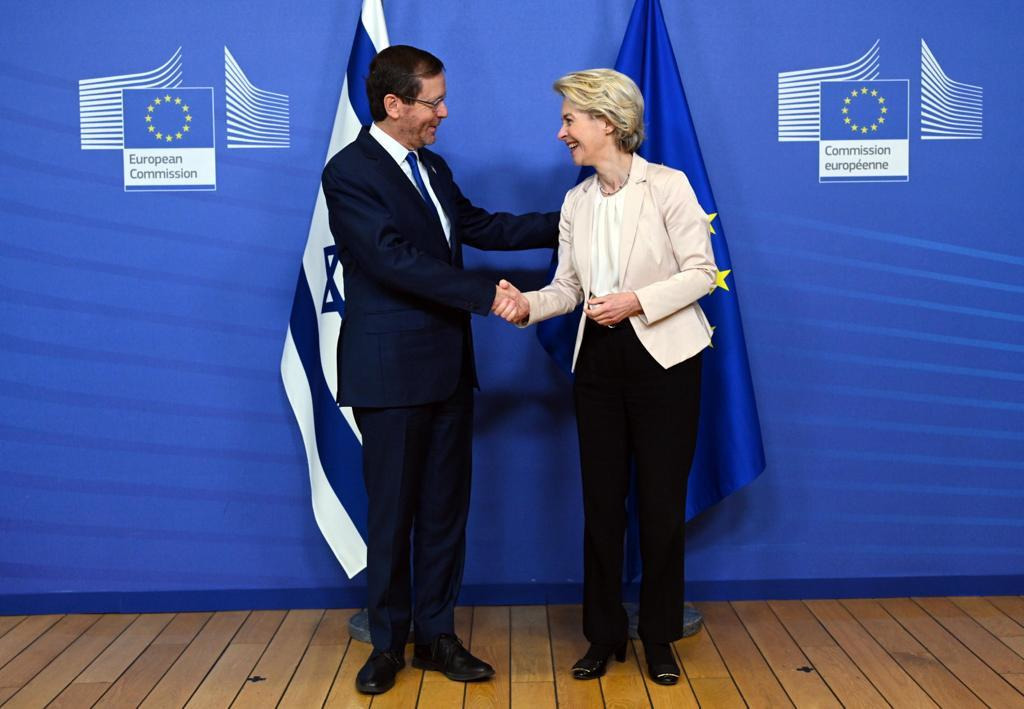
Herzog with President of the European Commission Ursula von der Leyen in Brussels, 2023

On 19 May 2021, Herzog announced his candidacy in the 2021 Israeli presidential election. On 2 June 2021, he was elected as president by the Knesset. He won more votes than any presidential candidate in Israel's history, receiving 87 votes compared to 26 for his opponent Miriam Peretz, and was sworn in on 7 July 2021, becoming the first son of a former Israeli president to also become president.

Assuming the Presidency in the midst of the coronavirus pandemic, Isaac Herzog played a prominent role in Israel's COVID-19 response. He launched the world’s first booster vaccination drive by receiving his third dose in July 2021, and later received his fourth dose in January 2022, to help encourage widespread public immunization.

In 2023, with the country facing civil unrest, Herzog positioned himself as a chief mediator during the 2023 judicial reform crisis, urging compromise. He proposed an alternative framework, the "People's Outline", which sought broad consensus over unilateral changes to Israel's judiciary.

All of this pivoted following the October 7 attacks, with Herzog and his wife's roles focused on strengthening the nation's morale leading national memorials, consoling bereaved families, advocating for the hostages, and serving as a leading voice in the international media defending Israel’s military actions. Herzog has also consistently called for an independent, non-political opening of a state commission of inquiry into the state's intelligence and security failures.

Diplomatic activity was a core focus of Herzog’s activity and he is the first Israeli President to visit UAE, Bahrain, Zambia, and Panama. Herzog also leads the efforts in encouraging interfaith relations inside Israel and internationally. Herzog is a leading voice in speaking out against the rise of crime in the Arab sector in Israeli society and the importance of national authorities in taking action against it.

Some of the key initiatives introduced by Herzog during his time in office are Time to Talk, the Climate Forum and establishing the Voice of the People council.

== Personal life ==
Herzog is married to Michal Herzog, a lawyer, and has three sons. He lives in the Beit HaNassi in Jerusalem. Before the Presidency, he lived in the Tzahala neighborhood of Tel Aviv.

Party political offices
| Preceded by Shelly Yachimovich | Leader of the Labor Party; 2013–2017 | Succeeded by Avi Gabbay |
| Position established | Co-leader of the Zionist Union; 2014–2017 | Succeeded by Avi Gabbay |
Political offices
| Preceded by Shelly Yachimovich | Leader of the Opposition; 2013–2018 | Succeeded by Tzipi Livni |
| Preceded by Reuven Rivlin | President of Israel; 2021–present | Incumbent |
Civic offices
| Preceded by Natan Sharansky | Chairman of the Jewish Agency; 2018–2021 | TBD |
