= Sarah Herzog =

Diplomat; mother of 6th President of Israel

- שָׂרָה הֶרְצוֹג
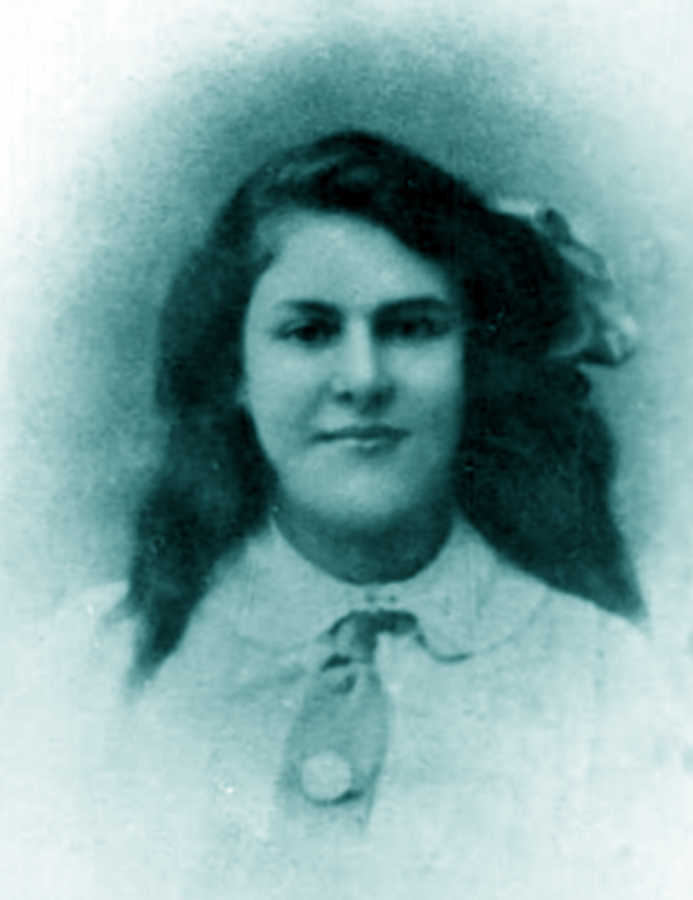
- Herzog, c. 1900–1910
- Born: Sarah Hillman; 1896; Riga, Livonia, Russia
- Died: 1979 (aged 82–83); Israel
- Occupations: Rabbitzit, diplomat
- Spouse: Yitzchak HaLevi Herzog
- Children: Chaim Herzog; Yaakov Herzog

Sarah Herzog (Hebrew: שָׂרָה הֶרְצוֹג; née Hillman; b. 1896 – d. 1979) was an Israeli rebbetzin (rabbanit) and diplomat. She was also the mother of Chaim Herzog, 6th President of Israel, and Yaakov Herzog, Israeli diplomat.

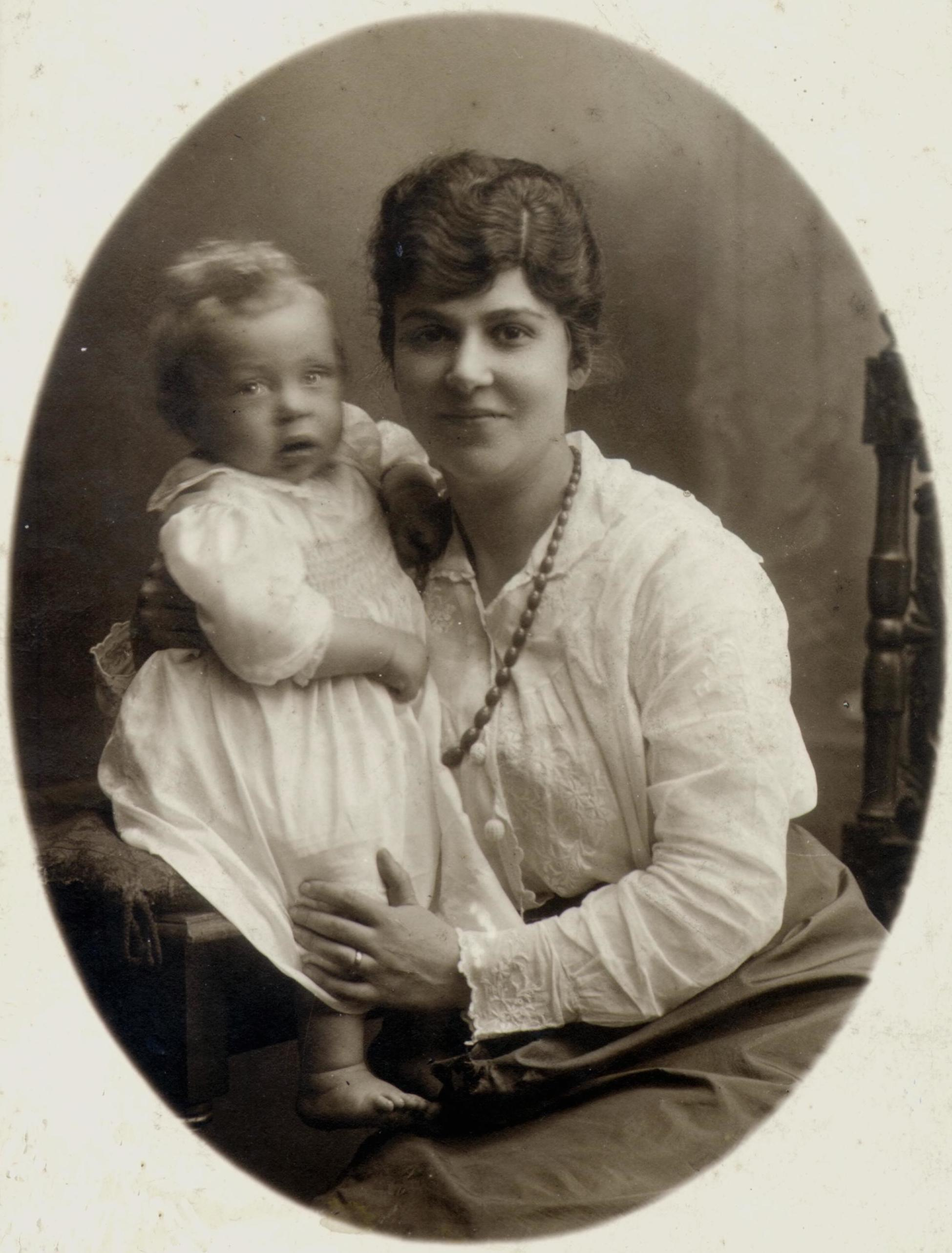
Herzog holding her year-old son Chaim (Belfast, around 1919)

== Early life ==
Born in Riga, Livonia, Russia, Herzog grew up in London. She was the daughter of Rabbi Shmuel Yitzchak Hillman, who invited Belfast Rabbi Isaac Herzog (Yitzchak HaLevi Herzog) to his home for a conference regarding kosher dietary laws during World War I rationing in 1917. According to family history, Sarah dropped a tea tray when she saw Isaac, who was also immediately smitten (in some versions, Sarah spilled tea all over Isaac).

In August 1917, Sarah married Isaac and assumed the title and responsibilities of a rebbetzin, or rabbi's wife. A year later, their son Chaim was born, in Belfast.

The Herzogs moved to Dublin in 1919, where their son Yaakov was born in December 1921.

The family moved to Israel in 1936, where Isaac Herzog became the Chief Rabbi of Eretz Israel.

Later in his life, Chaim remembered his mother as clearly the dominant individual at home. She was very pretty and gracious and, although petite, almost regal in her demeanour. Wherever her home was, it was a centre of grace and culture and, later, in Israel, a magnet for the Jewish community from around the world. In his inaugural address as president of Israel in 1983, Chaim spoke at length of the influence of both his parents and of his mother, a personality in her own right. Her grandson remembered her as welcoming and hospitable, especially towards the impoverished.

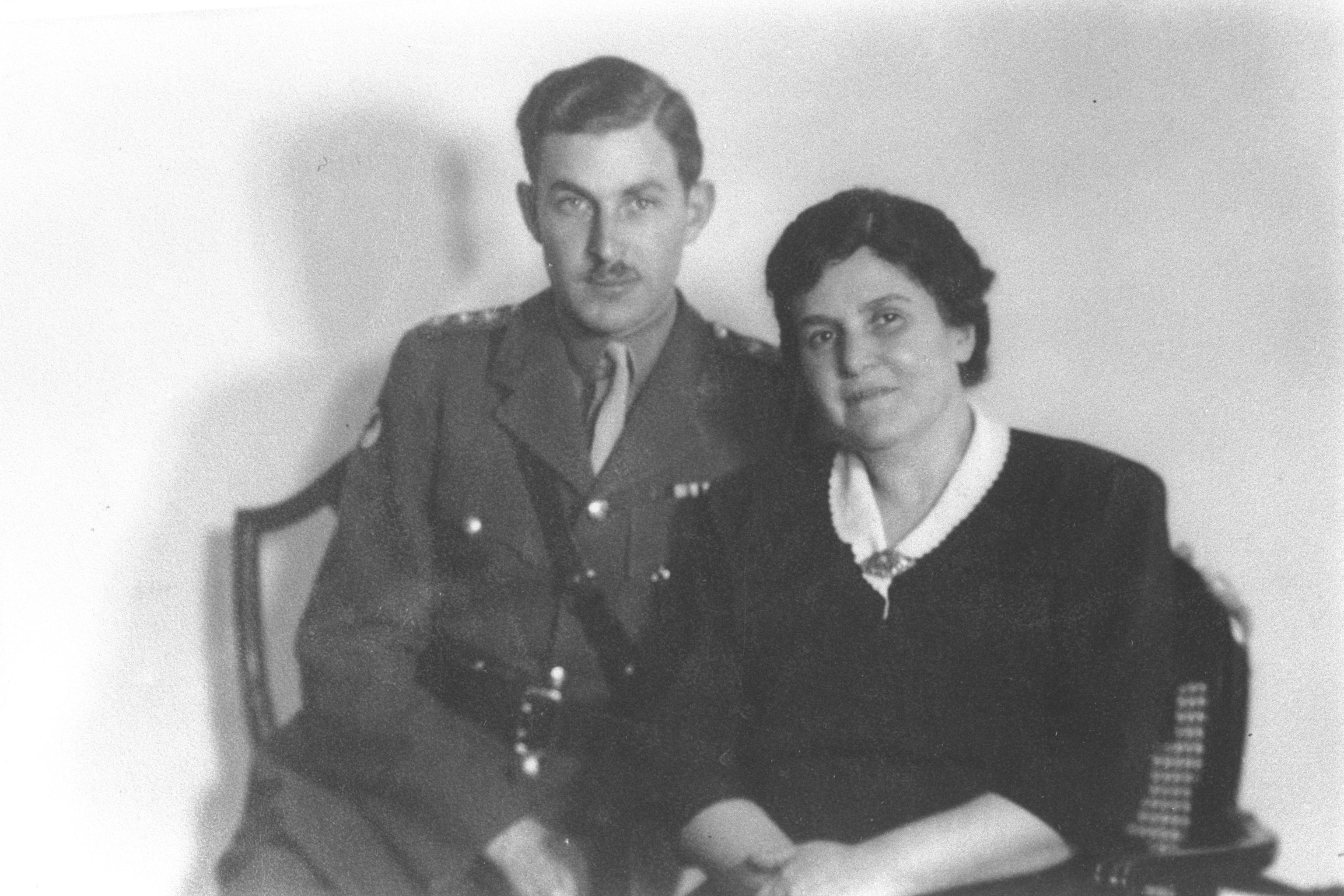
Chaim Herzog in a British Army uniform with his mother Sarah

== Life in Israel ==
In May 1939, Herzog was active in protests against the "MacDonald White Paper," the British policy which effectively halted Jewish immigration to Palestine on the eve of World War II. With Rachel Ben-Zvi and Ita Yellin, she organized specific women's protests against the policy of saving Jewish children from Nazi-controlled territory (Kindertransport) but not allowing these children to be relocated to Palestine.

She was religiously observant and initially had reservations about Chaim's fiancée Aura Ambache, though she later welcomed her into the family.

She proposed the creation of Mother's Day in pre-state Israel in 1947, though nothing came of her proposal.

After her husband's death, Herzog continued to be active in Israeli politics as an unofficial ambassador and in international Jewish women's organizations. In 1954, she travelled to Montreal in her role as President of the World's Mizrachi Women's Organization. She often hosted the wives of rabbis and other dignitaries, including during the first World Conference of Ashkenazi and Sephardic Congregations in 1968.

In 1977, Herzog was the founding president of Jewish women's Zionist organization World Emunah.

== Honours, decorations, awards and distinctions ==
An educational center in Bnei Brak for religious Jewish women is named Neve Sarah Herzog in her honour. The Sarah Herzog Children's Home in Afula is a residential centre built in 1943 for children orphaned by the Holocaust is also named after her.

In the 1980s, the Jerusalem hospital Ezrath Nashim was renamed Herzog Hospital after her, who was its volunteer president for forty years.

Chapters of the Emunah Organization honour recipients with the "Rabbinit Sarah Herzog Award."
