= Herzog Hospital =

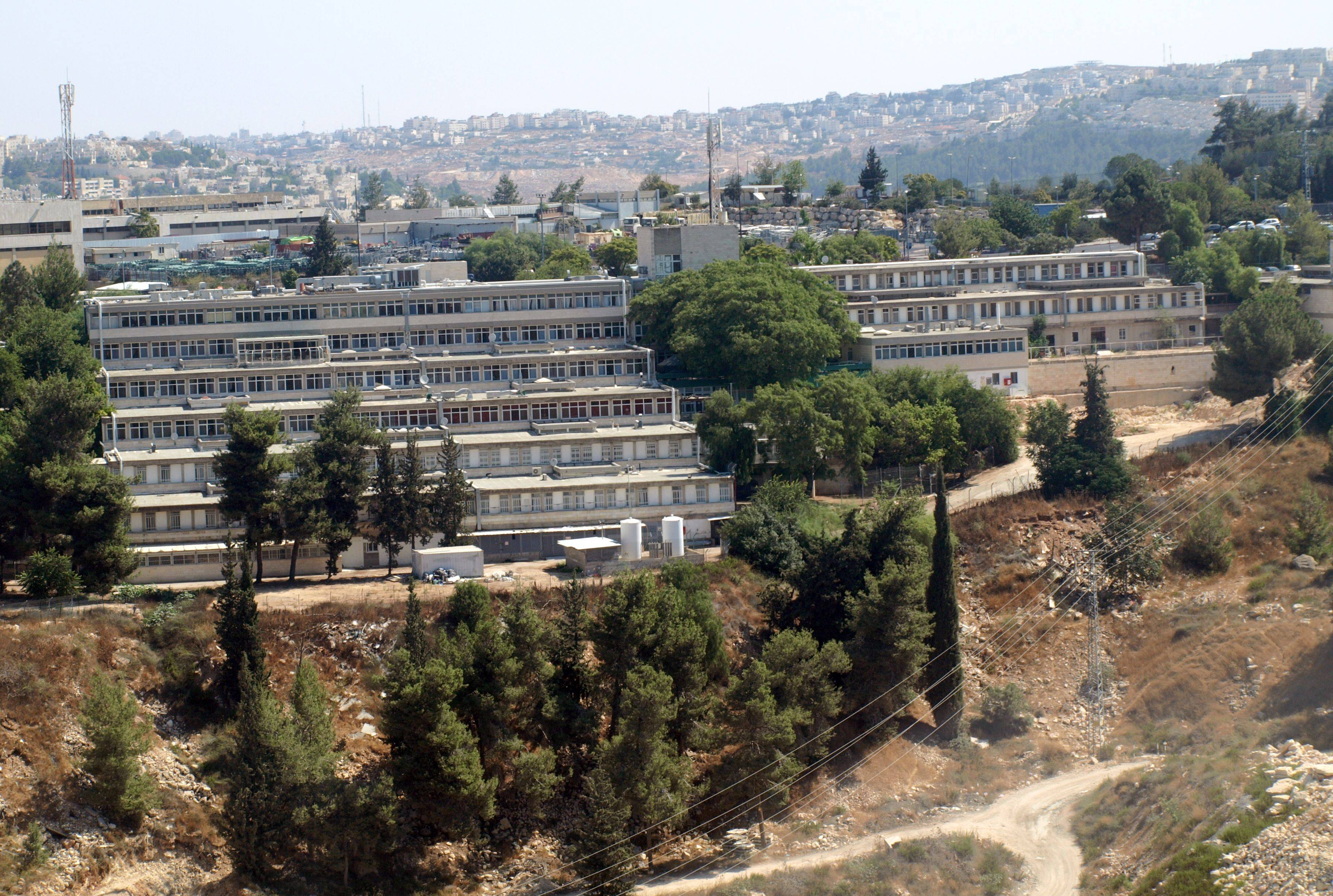
- Sarah Herzog Hospital, Jerusalem

Geography
- Location: Jerusalem, Israel
- Coordinates: 31°47′44″N 35°11′07″E

Services
- Beds: 501

Links
- Website: www.herzoghospital.org/herzog-hospital

Herzog Hospital (formerly Ezrat Nashim Hospital) (Hebrew: בית חולים הרצוג) is a geriatric-psychiatric hospital in Jerusalem, Israel. It is the third largest hospital in the city. Herzog Hospital specializes in nursing care for the elderly. The director-general of the hospital is Jacob Haviv. It is named after Sarah Herzog.

== History ==
The Ezrat Nashim society was established in 1894 in the Old City of Jerusalem to provide care for the chronically ill.

The original building was planned by Israel Prize winner, architect Arieh Sharon in 1961. Until the late 1960s, the hospital specialized in psychiatric inpatient cases. Since then, it has been a geriatric hospital that treats both the elderly and the mentally ill, and engages in clinical research in geriatrics and psychiatry.

Herzog Hospital has 550 beds. It also operates outpatient clinics to treat problems associated with aging.

Herzog Hospital has installed a Snoezelen room for the rehabilitation of geriatric and other patients. According to former CEO Dr. Yehezkel Caine, the facility can improve the abilities of patients with mental, psychological, cognitive, movement and other problems. The room is furnished with carefully selected elements that stimulate the senses.

Herzog Hospital runs a program to train young Ethiopian-Israeli women to work as nurses' aides. The goals of the program are to alleviate the shortage of trained personnel in the field of geriatric care-giving, and encourage Ethiopian immigrants to join the workforce.

In 2006, Herzog opened a Children's Respiratory Care Unit to provide long-term respiratory care for children ranging in age from 3 months to 17.

The hospital's Resilience Unit has developed psychotrauma programs utilizing the vast experience that Israeli psychologists have accumulated in treating terror-related post-traumatic stress.

== Development plans ==
In 2012, work began on a new medical pavilion comprising two basement levels and six patient floors, adding 240 beds to the hospital.

== See also ==
- Israel Center for the Treatment of Psychotrauma
- Health care in Israel
- List of hospitals in Israel
