= Council for a Beautiful Israel =

Israeli non-profit organization

Coordinates: 32.1006°N 34.8017°E

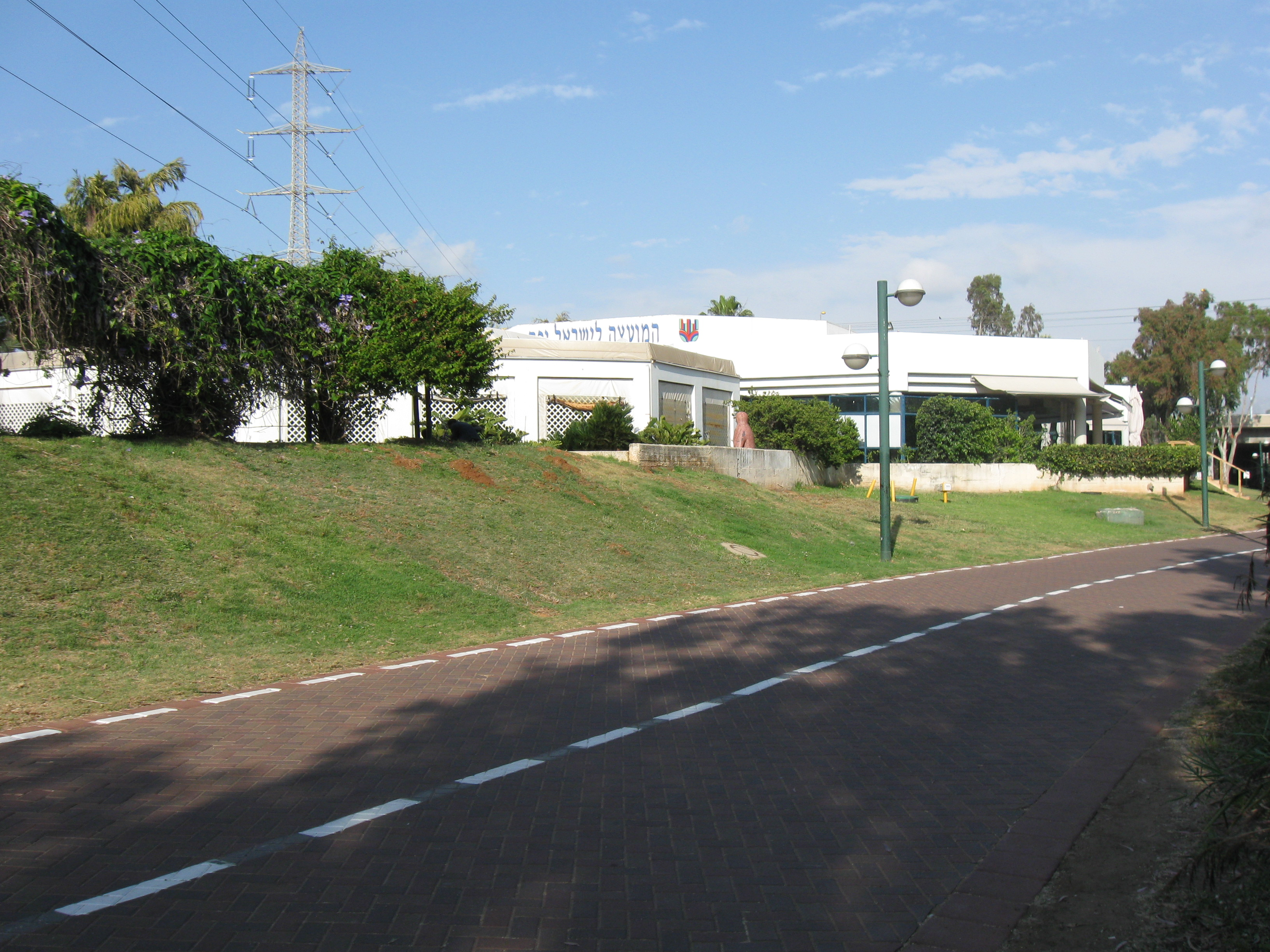
Council office in the Yarkon Park

The Council for a Beautiful Israel (CBI) (Hebrew: המועצה לישראל יפה, romanized: ha-mo'atza le-Yisra'el yafa) is a public non-profit organization focused on improving the quality of life in Israel. CBI was Israel's first environmental association.

== History ==
The Council for a Beautiful Israel was founded in 1968 by the Interior Committee of the Knesset and Aura Herzog, who served as its international president. CBI oversees environmental awareness programs, environmental action on a national and local level, green urban projects and competitions revolving around environmental awareness.

In 2010, work began on a new environmental and educational center in Kiryat HaLeom, Jerusalem. Most of the Council's work is carried out by volunteers, including children, who are known as the 'Guardians of a Beautiful Israel'.

== Awards ==
The Yakir Award is awarded every year by the President of Israel for an outstanding contribution to the Jewish community in Israel and the Diaspora, especially in environmental issues and the preservation of quality of life in Israel.
