= Yaakov Herzog =

Israeli diplomat (1921–1972)

- יעקב הרצוג
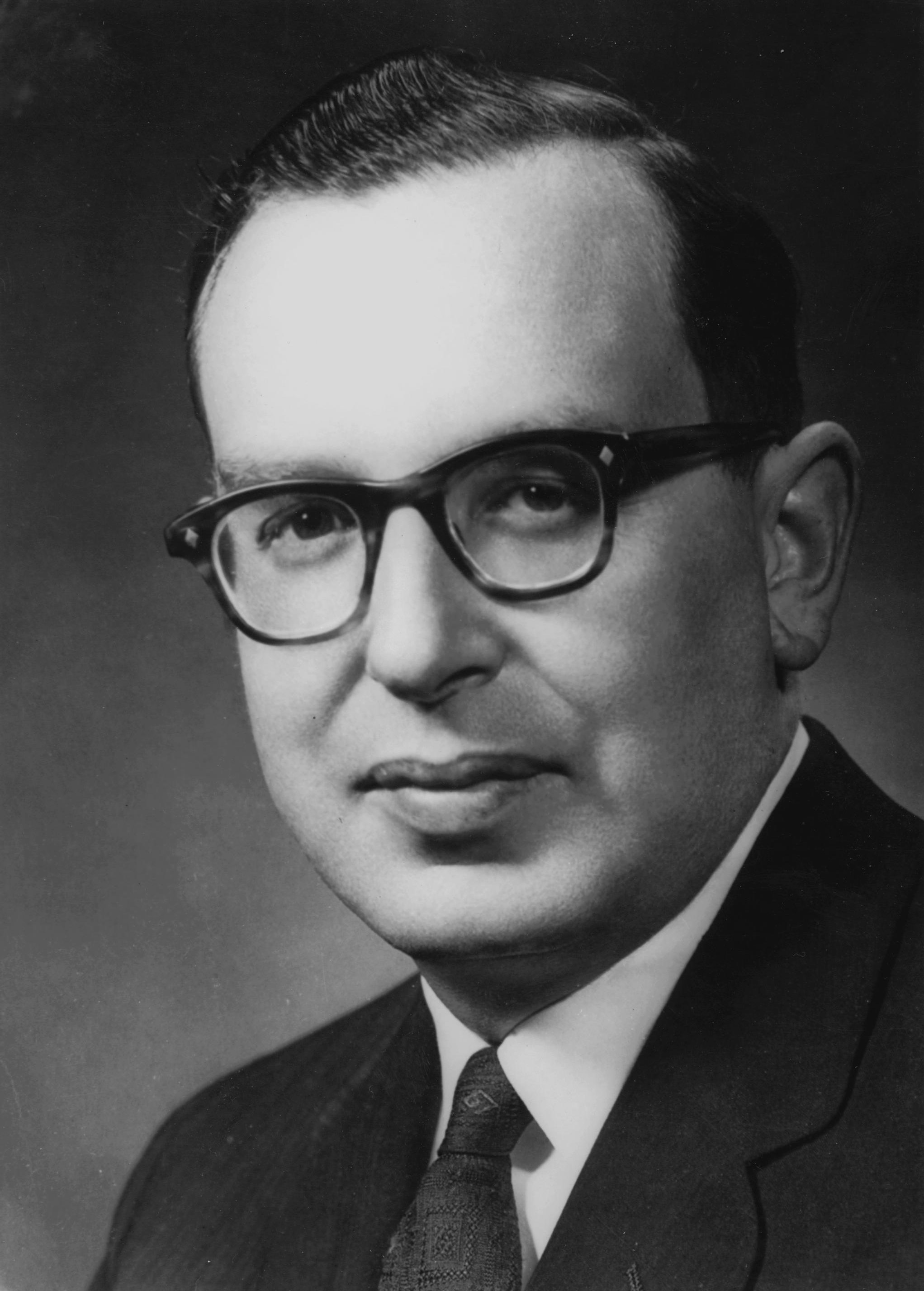
- Herzog in 1968
- Born: 11 December 1921; Dublin, Ireland
- Died: 9 March 1972 (aged 50)
- Resting place: Sanhedria Cemetery, Jerusalem, Israel
- Education: Doctorate in international law from McGill University
- Spouse: Pnina Shachor
- Children: 3, Eliezra-Elinora Herzog, Yitzchak-Isaac Shai Herzog, Shira Herzog
- Relatives: Herzog family

Yaakov Herzog (Hebrew: יעקב דוד הרצוג; 11 December 1921 – 9 March 1972) was an Irish-born Israeli diplomat.

== Biography ==
Yaakov Herzog was born in Dublin, Ireland. His father was Yitzhak HaLevi Herzog, the first Ashkenazi Chief Rabbi of Israel, and his mother Sarah Herzog. His older brother, Chaim Herzog, became the sixth President of Israel. The family immigrated to Mandate Palestine in 1937. After he was ordained as a rabbi in the Harry Fischel Seminary in Jerusalem, Herzog studied law at the Hebrew University of Jerusalem and the University of London. He earned a doctorate in international law from McGill University in Montreal. Herzog served in Shai, the intelligence and counter-espionage unit of the Haganah.

== Diplomatic career ==
After the founding of the State of Israel, Herzog worked for the Israel Ministry of Foreign Affairs. From 1948 to 1954 he counseled on issues relating to Jerusalem. From 1954 to 1957 he was the chief of the United States division. He advised Prime Minister of Israel David Ben-Gurion on policy from 1956 to 1957.

From 1957 to 1960 Herzog was the minister at the Israeli embassy in Washington D. C., and from 1960 to 1963 he was the Israeli ambassador to Canada.

Herzog helped improve relations with the Vatican after the Six-Day War, and led diplomatic communications with King Hussein of Jordan. He held secret talks with Hussein in a London clinic that opened the way to peace between Jordan and Israel, established secret contacts with Lebanese Christians, helped the Imam of Yemen against his enemies, and became a personal friend to President Kennedy, Secretary of State John Foster Dulles, Ireland's leader Éamon de Valera and other world figures.

From 1965 until his death in 1972, he served as the director-general of the Prime Minister of Israel's office under the administrations of Levi Eshkol and Golda Meir. In January 1961, when he was ambassador in Canada, he engaged in a famous public debate with the British historian Arnold J. Toynbee, who called the Jewish people a "fossil" and compared Israel's actions in the 1948 Arab–Israeli War to the actions of the Nazis against the Jews in the Holocaust.

In 1969, Rabbi She'ar Yashuv Cohen and the philologist Rebecca Shribman-Cohen-Zedek he agreed to join the society for Justice-Ethics-Morals. He served as the chairman of the society for Justice-Ethics-Morals from its foundation in 1969 until his death in 1972.

Isaiah Berlin described him as "one of the best and wisest, most attractive and morally most impressive human beings I have ever known." Yehuda Avner called him "one of Israel's commanding intellects, possessed of a subtle and powerful mind, who was equally at home with Bach as he was with the Bible."

Herzog died on March 9, 1972, several months after suffering brain damage from a fall at his home.

== Commemoration ==
Many educational institutions, especially in the Religious Zionism sector, perpetuate his memory: Kiryat Yaakov Herzog high school in Kfar Saba, Yaakov Herzog Jewish Studies College in Ein Tzurim, Herzog College for training of teachers in Alon Shvut, the Maalot Yaakov Yeshiva, and the law faculty at Bar-Ilan University, are named after him.

== Published works ==
- A translation of Berakhot, Pe'ah and Demai was first printed in 1947 and reprinted in 1980.
- About Israel and its land: an argument with Professor Arnold Toynbee. Jerusalem: Office of Education and Culture, 5735 (1974-1975).
- A nation that lives alone. Tel Aviv: Maariv books, 1975.
- The Anderson Mission
