= Chaim Herzog =

President of Israel from 1983 to 1993

- חַיִּים הֶרְצוֹג
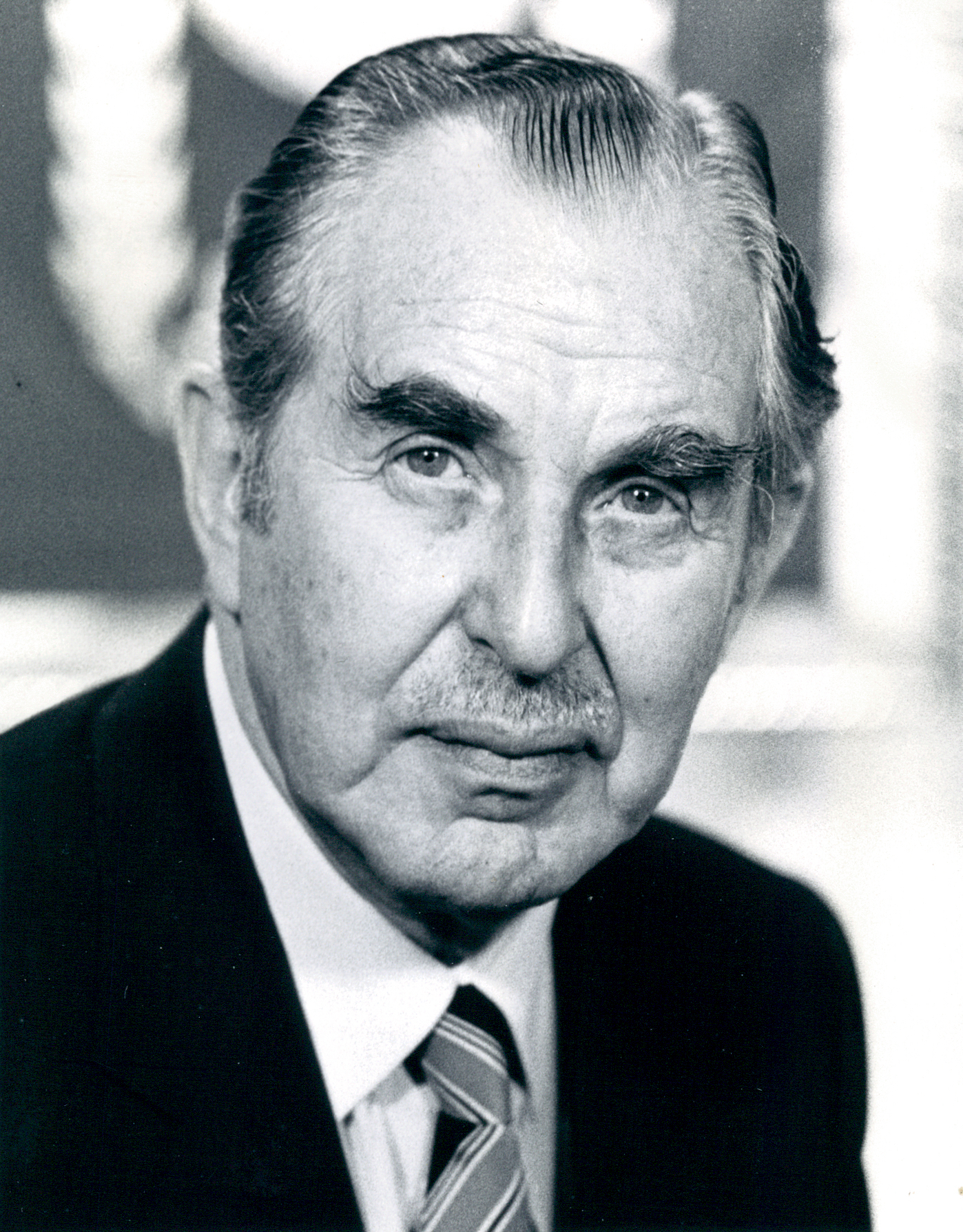
- Official portrait, c. 1983

6th President of Israel
- In office 5 May 1983 – 13 May 1993
- Prime Minister: Menachem Begin; Yitzhak Shamir; Shimon Peres; Yitzhak Rabin
- Preceded by: Yitzhak Navon
- Succeeded by: Ezer Weizman

Member of the Knesset
- In office 20 July 1981 – 22 March 1983

5th Permanent Representative of Israel to the United Nations
- In office 1975–1978
- Prime Minister: Yitzhak Rabin; Menachem Begin
- Preceded by: Yosef Tekoah
- Succeeded by: Yehuda Zvi Blum

Personal details
- Born: 17 September 1918 Belfast, Ireland
- Died: 17 April 1997 (aged 78) Tel Aviv, Israel
- Resting place: Mount Herzl
- Party: Alignment (1981–1991)
- Spouse: Aura Ambache (m. 1947)
- Children: 4, including Isaac and Michael
- Relatives: Herzog family
- Education: University College London; University of Cambridge
- Nickname: "Vivian"

Military service
- Allegiance: United Kingdom (1942–1947); Israel (1948–1962)
- Branch/service: British Army; Israel Defense Forces
- Rank: Major (UK); Major-general (Israel)
- Battles/wars: World War II; 1948 Arab–Israeli War

Chaim Herzog (Hebrew: חַיִּים הֶרְצוֹג; 17 September 1918 – 17 April 1997) was an Irish-Israeli politician, military officer, lawyer and author who served as President of Israel from 1983 to 1993. Born in Belfast and raised primarily in Dublin, the son of Ireland's Chief Rabbi Yitzhak HaLevi Herzog, he immigrated to Mandatory Palestine in 1935. He served in the Haganah Jewish paramilitary group during the 1936–1939 Arab revolt and in the British Army during World War II. Following the end of the British Mandate and Israel's Declaration of Independence in 1948, he served in the Israel Defense Forces and fought in the 1948 Arab–Israeli War. He remained in the Israeli military as an officer following the war until retiring in 1962 with the rank of major-general.

After leaving the military, Herzog managed an industrial conglomerate and co-founded the Herzog, Fox & Ne'eman law firm, which would become one of Israel's largest law firms. Between 1975 and 1978 he served as Israel's Permanent Representative to the United Nations, in which capacity he denounced UN General Assembly Resolution 3379—the "Zionism is Racism" resolution—and symbolically tore it up before the assembly. Herzog entered politics in the 1981 elections, winning a Knesset seat as a member of the Alignment. Two years later, in March 1983, he was elected to the largely ceremonial role of President. He served for two five-year terms before retiring in 1993. He died four years later and was buried on Mount Herzl, Jerusalem.

His son Isaac Herzog, who between 2013 and 2017 led the Israeli Labor Party and was the parliamentary Opposition in the Knesset, is the incumbent President of Israel. The pair are the first father and son to have served as the nation's president.

== Biography ==
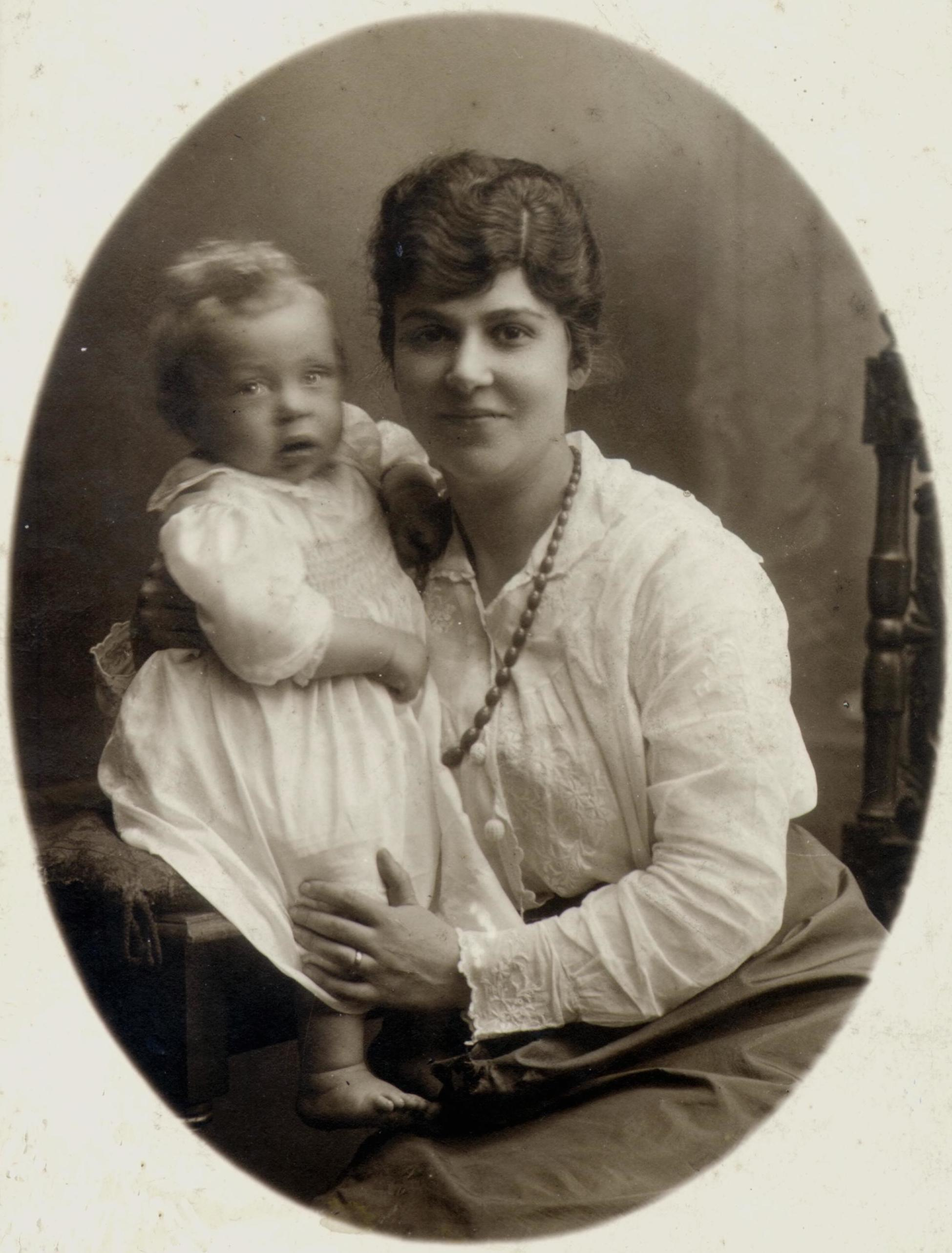
Herzog with his mother at age 1

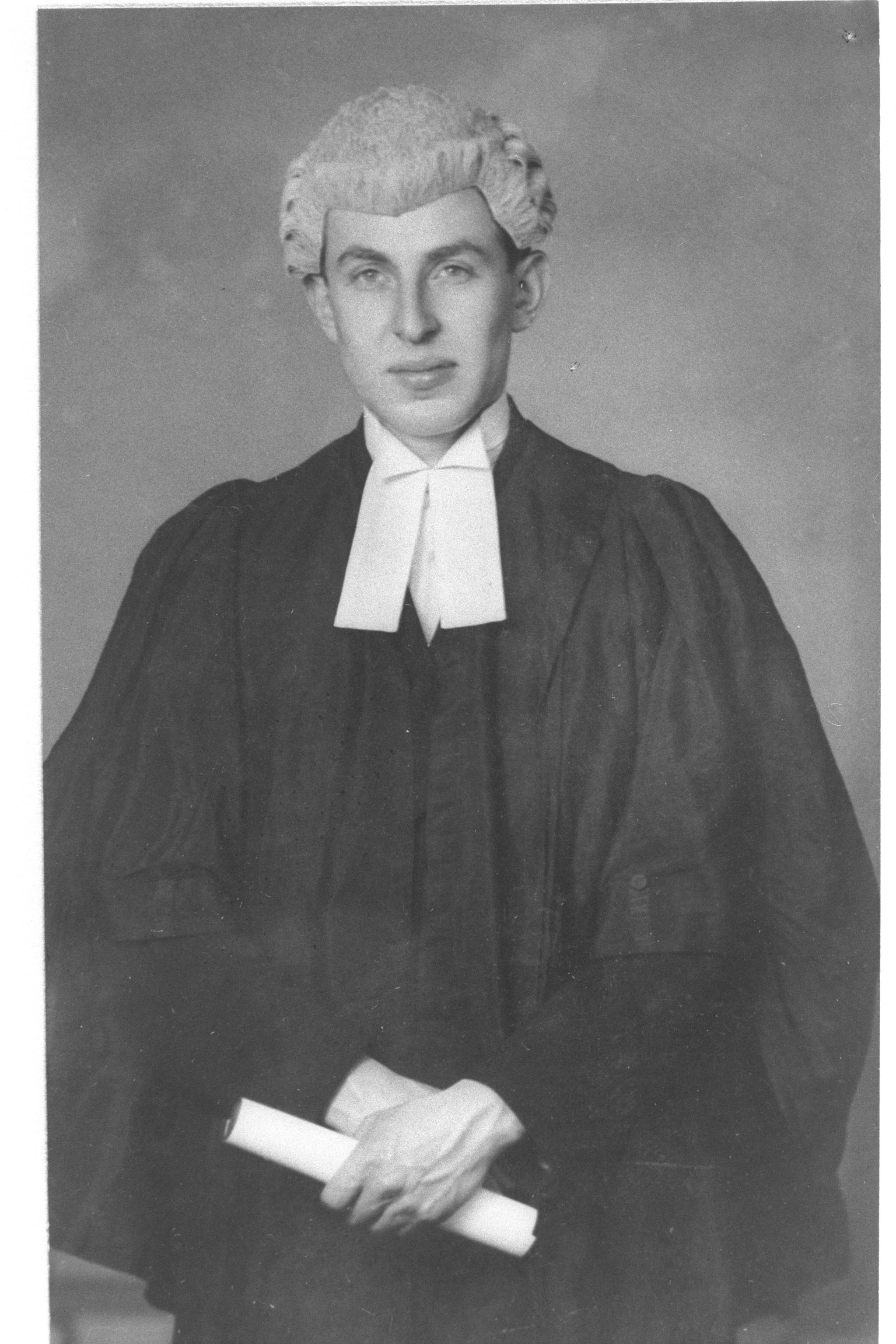
Herzog upon completion of his law degree, 1941.

Chaim Herzog was born at 2 Norman Villas, Cliftonville Road in Belfast, Ireland, in the United Kingdom, as the son of Rabbi Yitzhak HaLevi Herzog, who was Chief Rabbi of Ireland from 1919 to 1937 (and later of Mandatory Palestine and the State of Israel), and his wife Sarah (née Hillman). His father was born in Łomża in what was then Congress Poland, part of the Russian Empire, and his mother Sarah Herzog was born in Riga, in what was then the Governorate of Livonia, also part of the Russian Empire at that time; his maternal grandfather was the Orthodox Jewish Talmudic scholar Shmuel Yitzchak Hillman. When Herzog was nine months old the family relocated to Dublin after his father became Chief Rabbi of Ireland. The family home from 1919 was at 33 Bloomfield Avenue, Portobello, Dublin.

Herzog's father, a fluent Irish speaker, was known as "the Sinn Féin Rabbi" for his support of the First Dáil and the Irish republican cause during the Irish War of Independence. Herzog was raised as an Orthodox Jew and attended a traditional Jewish primary school, or cheder, as a child. He received a secular education at the coeducational kindergarten of Alexandra College, which was otherwise a girls' school, and at Wesley College, Dublin.

In his youth, Herzog was also an athlete, becoming proficient in cricket, rugby, and boxing. He was a junior bantamweight boxing champion.

Worried about rising intermarriage and assimilation rates among Jewish youth in Ireland, Herzog's parents decided to send him to study at yeshiva abroad and gave him a choice of studying in Poland, Switzerland, or Mandatory Palestine. Herzog, who was a Zionist, chose Palestine and moved there in 1935. He studied at the Mercaz HaRav and Hebron Yeshivas in Jerusalem. In 1937 he was joined there by his parents upon his father being chosen as Ashkenazi Chief Rabbi of Palestine. He also joined the Jewish paramilitary group Haganah and the Mandatory government's Jewish Supernumerary Police. During the 1936–39 Arab revolt in Palestine he served with the Haganah and Jewish Supernumerary Police in Jerusalem, mainly in the Old City and Arnona neighborhood. In 1938, he moved to the United Kingdom to study law at the University of Cambridge and University College London (UCL). He earned a Bachelor of Laws from UCL in 1941 and qualified as a barrister at Lincoln's Inn. He was called to the bar on 17 November 1942 and then devilled in the chambers of David Weitzman. Following his time at university, Herzog held the position of Chairman of the Union of Jewish Students (at that time named the Inter-University Jewish Federation).

== Military career ==
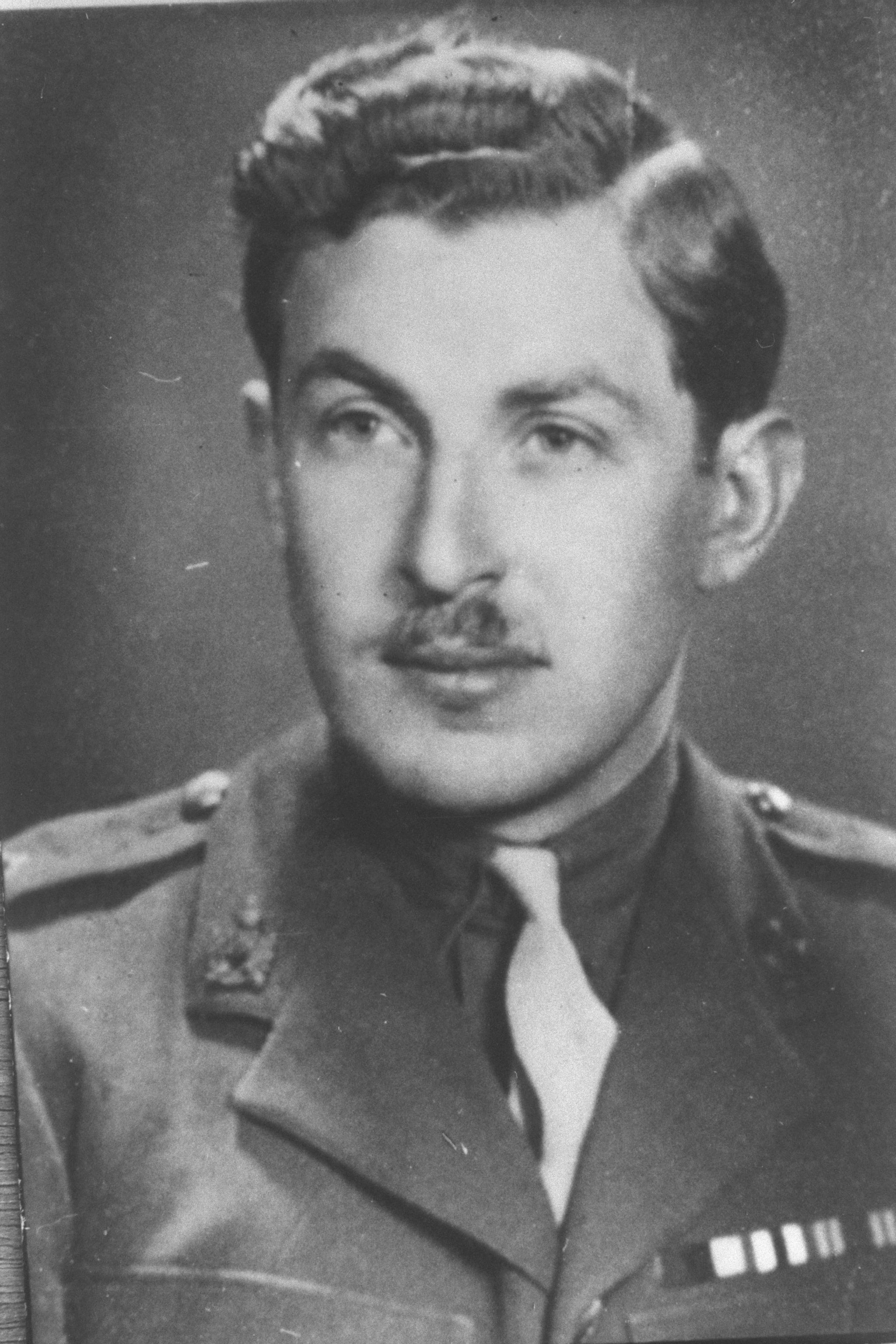
Herzog in the British Army

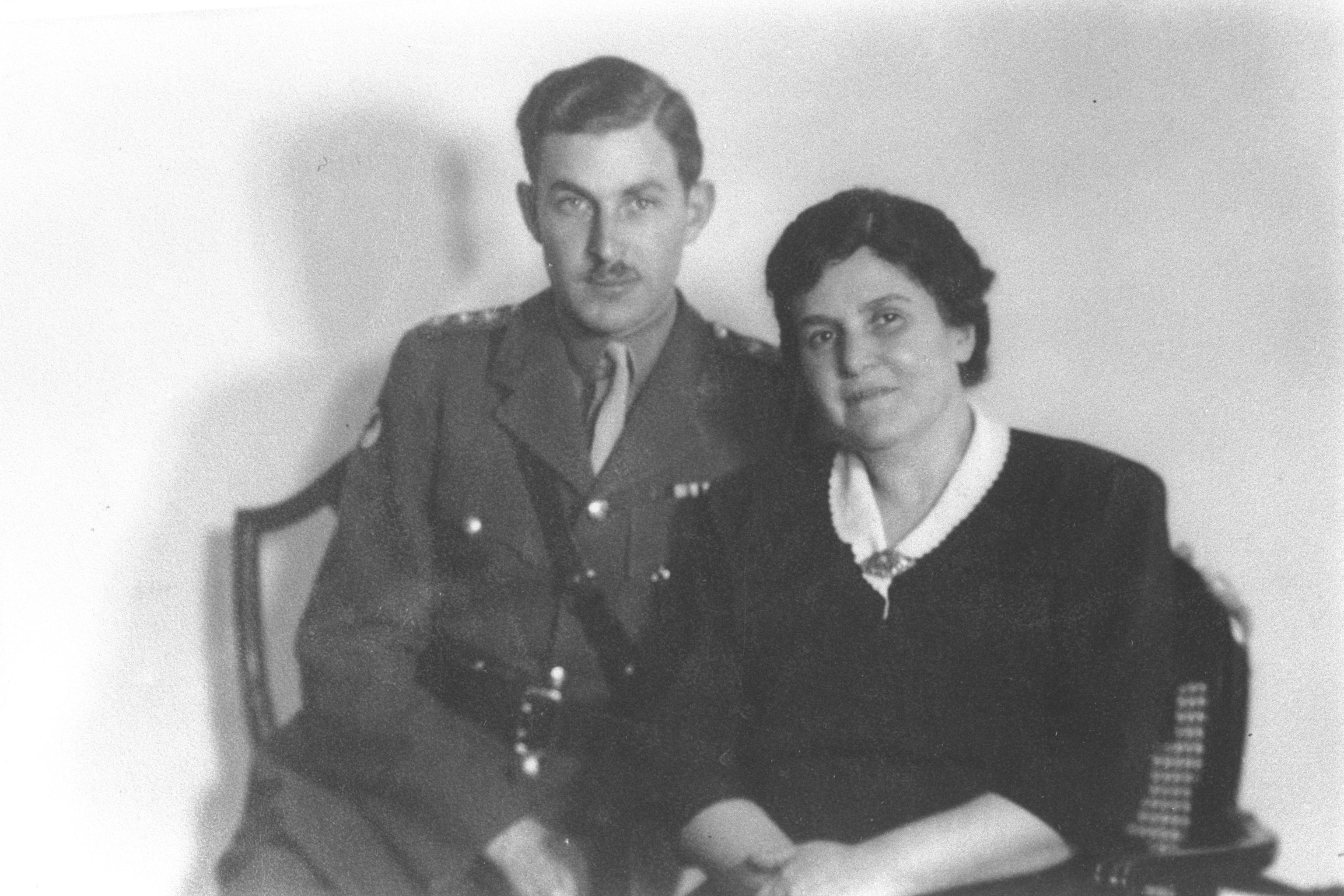
Herzog in his British Army uniform with his mother, 1945.

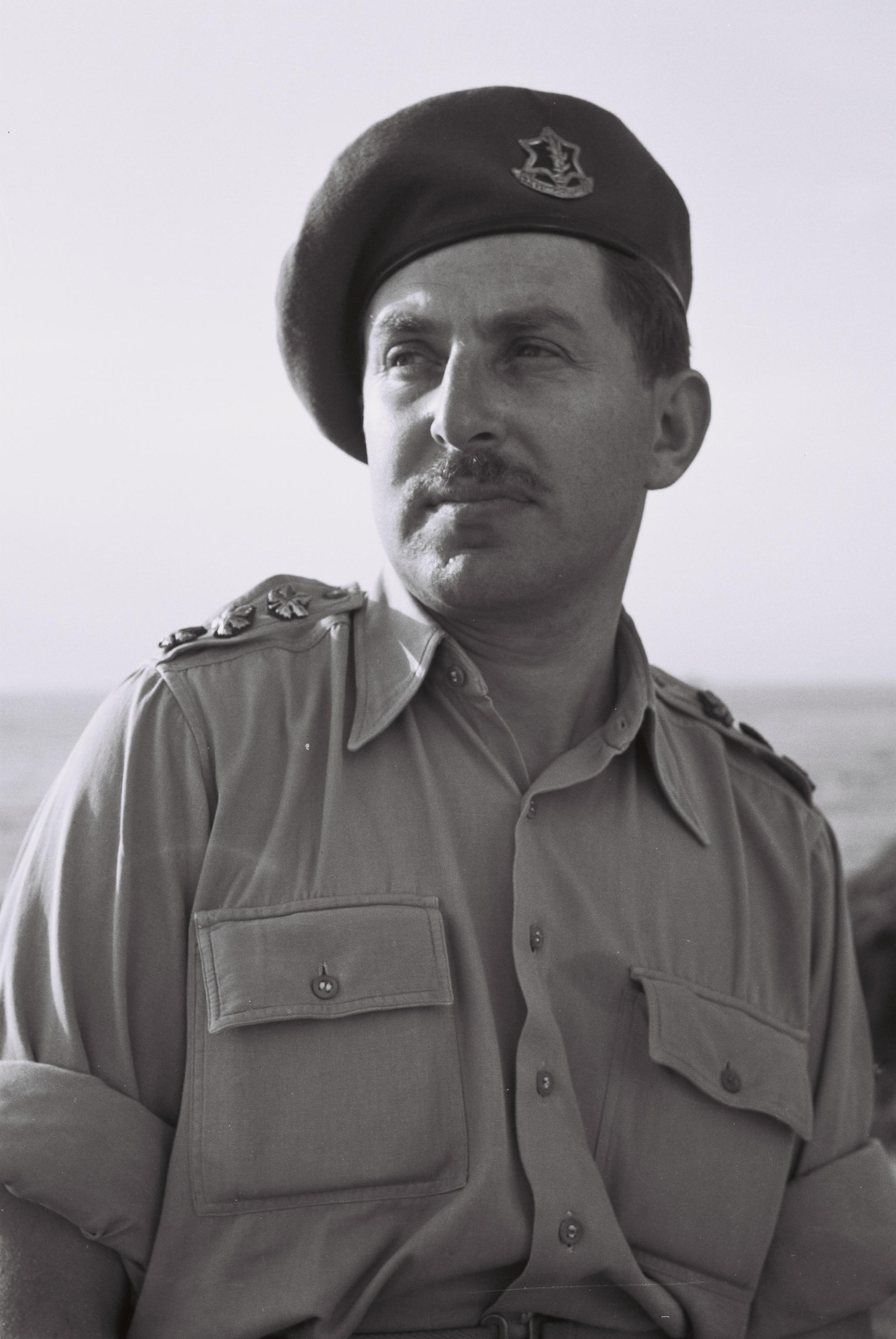
Herzog while serving as an Israeli military attaché in the United States, 1950.

With World War II underway, Herzog joined the Home Guard in 1940 and after starting studies at the University of Cambridge volunteered for the officer cadet training unit, joining the cavalry squadron where he trained with armored vehicles and horses. He enlisted in the British Army on 17 December 1942. After initial training with the Royal West Kent Regiment at Maidstone, Herzog was trained as an intelligence officer at the Intelligence Corps Training Depot at Wentworth Woodhouse and at Mons Officer Cadet School. He was commissioned into the Intelligence Corps in 1943. He underwent additional training at an intelligence officer's course at the University of Oxford and a prisoner of war interrogation course at the University of Cambridge. He was then posted to Northern Ireland as an intelligence officer on the staff of Lieutenant General Alan Cunningham, who would be the last British High Commissioner of Palestine, and was stationed at Thiepval Barracks, where his unit engaged in training with American units for the planned invasion of Normandy and handling security against potential IRA activity. Herzog was granted special permission to enter Belfast in civilian clothes. He was then transferred to serve as an intelligence officer with a division in southern England. Following the Normandy landings, he was given the task of interrogating German prisoners pending deployment as a brigade or divisional intelligence officer to northwest Europe, initially processing incoming prisoners before being assigned to conduct in-depth interrogations of prisoners deemed important. In July 1944 he was posted to Normandy as an intelligence officer in the Guards Armoured Division, taking part in operations across France, Belgium, the Netherlands, and Germany. While temporarily detached from the Guards Armoured Division to the Third Division, he was part of the first Allied formation to enter Germany. Herzog suffered ear damage in an artillery attack on the brigade headquarters he was posted to near Bremen while the assault on the city was being prepared. His left eardrum was permanently damaged, resulting in lifelong hearing impairment. He participated in the liberation of a Nazi concentration camp near Bremen and visited Bergen-Belsen concentration camp shortly after its liberation.

After the surrender of Germany, Herzog headed intelligence operations in several provinces of the British occupation zone in Germany from 1945 to 1947. He was tasked with identifying and interrogating Nazi officials, and briefly encountered Heinrich Himmler following his capture. During this period he also helped facilitate the illegal clandestine transport of Jews from the Soviet occupation zone to help them try to reach Palestine. He was discharged from the British Army in March 1947 as a war substantive captain and was granted the honorary rank of Major.

While in the British Army, Herzog was given his lifelong parallel name of "Vivian" because his first commander could not pronounce "Chaim"; but another Jewish soldier explained to the commander that "Vivian" was the English equivalent of "Chaim".

After being demobilized from the British Army, he returned to Palestine and practiced law before rejoining the Haganah. He headed spying operations on the United Nations Special Committee on Palestine. After the establishment of the State of Israel, he fought in the 1948 Arab–Israeli War, serving as an officer in the battles for Latrun.

Herzog's intelligence experience during World War II was seen as a valuable asset, and he became deputy director of the IDF Military Intelligence Branch in 1948, subsequently serving as director from 1949 to 1950. He used his experience as a British Army intelligence officer in World War II to lay the foundations of Israel's military intelligence network. From 1950 to 1954, he served as military attaché at the Israeli Embassy in the United States. Herzog left Washington in September 1954. A State Department official had informed him that he was about to be declared persona non grata. The decision to expel him had been taken following an FBI investigation into his attempt to recruit a Jordanian diplomat.

He subsequently served as commander of the IDF's Jerusalem District from 1954 to 1957 and as the head of Southern Command from 1957 to 1959. He again served as director of the Military Intelligence Branch from 1959 to 1962, during which time he introduced new technologies including computerization, enhanced intelligence cooperation with France, and established covert cooperation with the Iranian secret service SAVAK. He retired from the IDF in 1962 but remained a reservist with the rank of major-general. In 1967, following the Six-Day War, Herzog was recalled into active service and appointed to be the first military governor of the West Bank and East Jerusalem, serving in this position until 1968.

== Post-military career and activities ==
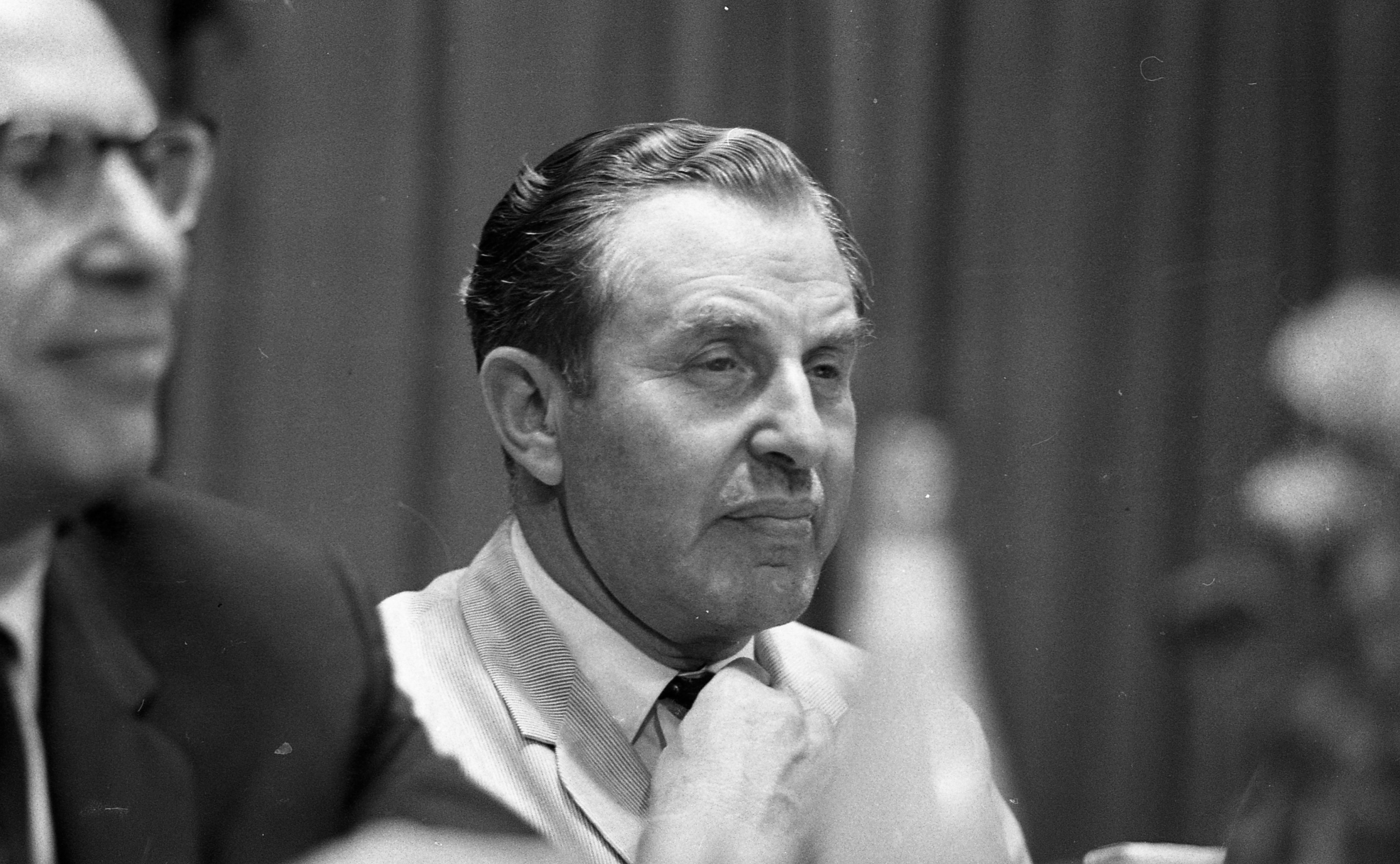
Herzog in 1969

After retiring from the army, Herzog was managing director of GUS-Rassco industrial conglomerate from 1962 to 1972. In 1965 he was among the founders of the Rafi political party which became one of the parties that merged to form the Israeli Labor Party. He ran for the Knesset in the 1969 Israeli legislative election but was not elected. In 1972, Herzog went into partnership with Michael Fox and Yaakov Neeman, and established the law firm of Herzog, Fox & Neeman, one of the largest law firms in Israel.

During the 1960s, Herzog appeared as a commentator in Israeli radio broadcasts and on the BBC, earning a reputation as Israel's leading political and military analyst. He was chief military commentator for Israel Radio during the Six-Day War and Yom Kippur War, making both radio and television commentary during the latter. His analysis immediately prior to and during the Six-Day War and during the Yom Kippur War was credited with raising public morale.

Herzog also established and chaired the Israeli chapter of the Variety children's charity, served as President of the World ORT Union, and was also Chairman of Keter Publications, where he oversaw the completion of Encyclopaedia Judaica. He was the author of several books, largely on Jewish and Israeli military history. His book on the Yom Kippur War is considered one of the cornerstones of study of that war. He published his memoirs in 1996.

== Diplomatic and political career ==
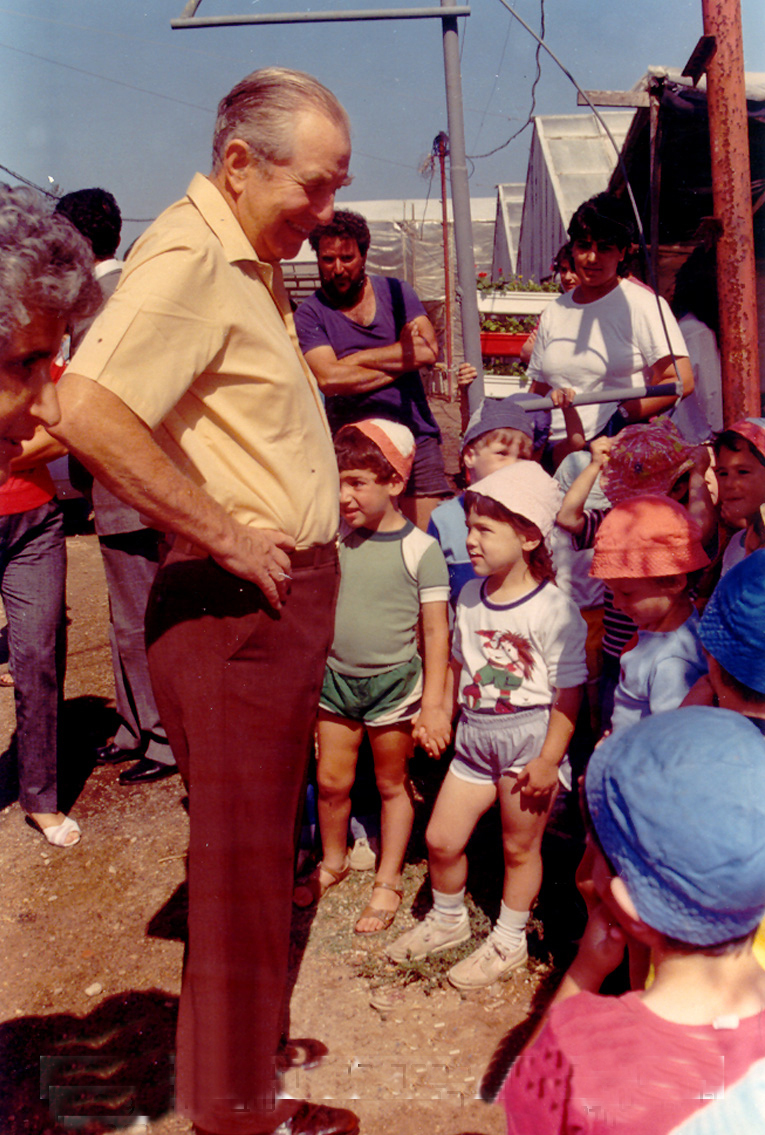
Herzog visiting Beit Yitzhak in 1985

In 1975, Herzog was appointed Israel's Ambassador to the United Nations, in which capacity he served until 1978. During his term the UN adopted the "Zionism is Racism" resolution (General Assembly Resolution 3379), which Herzog condemned and symbolically tore up (as his father had done to one of the British white papers regarding the British Mandate in Palestine), saying: "For us, the Jewish people, this resolution based on hatred, falsehood and arrogance, is devoid of any moral or legal value. For us, the Jewish people, this is no more than a piece of paper and we shall treat it as such." In recent years British historians headed by Simon Sebag Montefiore have included this speech in a book on speeches that changed the world, which includes others by Martin Luther King Jr., Nelson Mandela, Winston Churchill and John F. Kennedy. Furthermore, Herzog raised his voice against the indifference of some Jewish leaders who seemed "to act with indifference" to the light of the said condemnation against Zionism, he asked then: "Where is the Jewish people?" in The New York Times article titled: "Herzog Asserts Jews Didn't Aid Israelis in U.N. Zionism Debate". After the publication of the editorial, "several letters of support arrived to the Israel delegation at the United Nations", he had become a hero for the common Jewish American citizen.

Herzog also provided the Israeli justification for the Entebbe raid to the UN and conducted the first contacts between an Israeli and Egyptian diplomat with Egyptian ambassador Ahmed Asmat Abdel-Meguid.

In the 1981 elections, Herzog entered politics for the first time, winning a seat in the Knesset as a member of the Alignment, the predecessor to the Labor Party.

== President of Israel ==
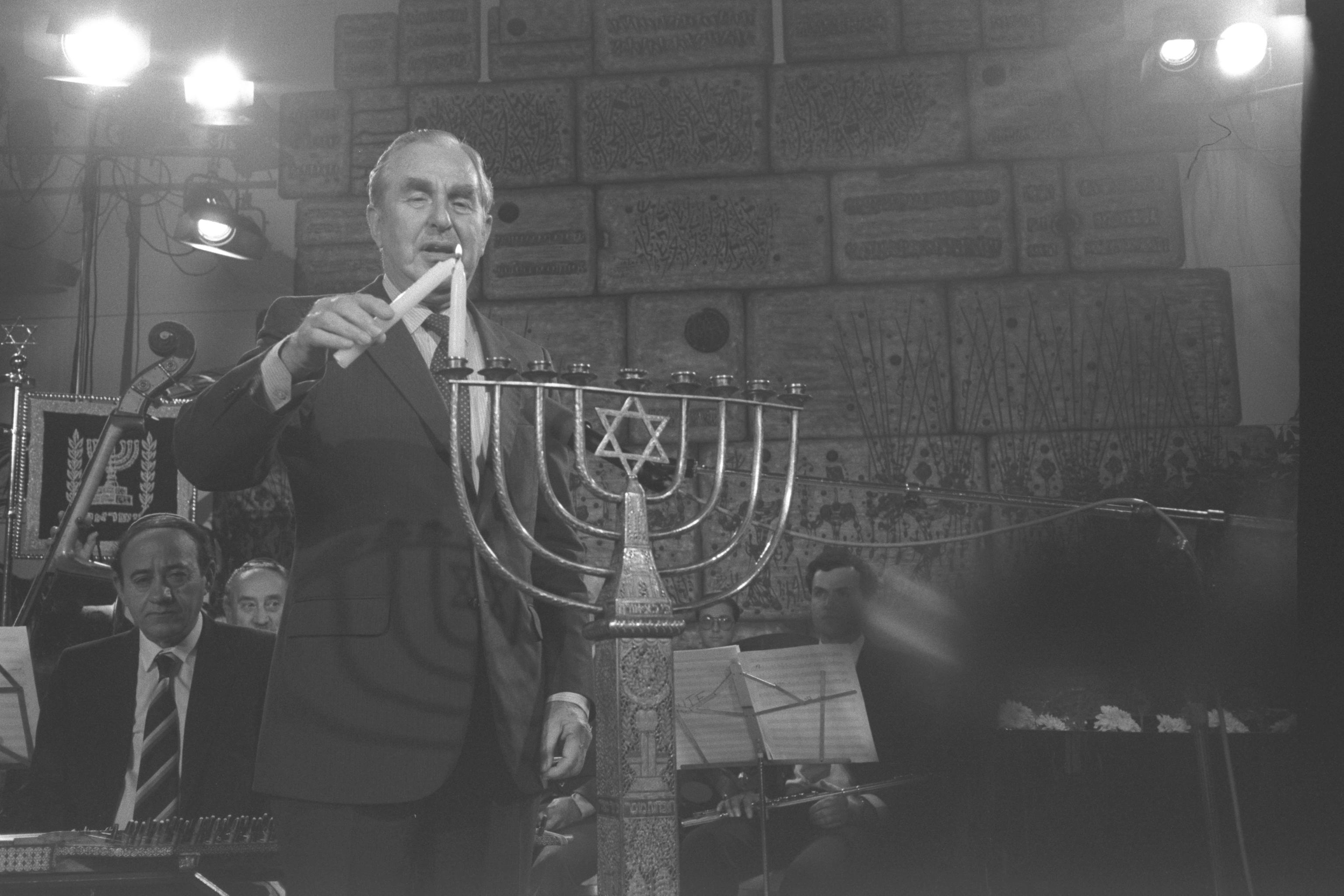
President Herzog lighting a Hannukah candle at Beit HaNassi, with Moshe Castel's Wall to the Glory of Jerusalem in the background, 1985

President Herzog visiting the commander of a Coalition Patriot missile battery during the Gulf War, February 1991.

On 22 March 1983, Herzog was elected by the Knesset to serve as the sixth President of Israel, by a vote of 61 to 57, against Menachem Elon, the candidate of the right and the government coalition. He assumed office on 5 May 1983 and served two five-year terms (then the maximum permitted by Israeli basic law), retiring from political life in 1993. As President of Israel, Herzog made official visits to over thirty countries and addressed fifteen national legislatures. He made the first Israeli presidential visits to the US and Canada. He was also the first Israeli President to visit West Germany, where he visited the Bergen-Belsen concentration camp which he had helped liberate as a British Army officer during World War II. He also visited far-east countries such as China, Australia, Singapore, and New Zealand. During a 1992 visit to Spain, he and King Juan Carlos I signed a symbolic order cancelling the Alhambra Decree which had ordered the expulsion of Jews from Spain 500 years before.

In 1985, during his state visit to the Republic of Ireland, Herzog visited Wesley College, Dublin (his alma mater), opened the Irish Jewish Museum in Dublin, and unveiled a sculpture in honour of his childhood friend, Cearbhall Ó Dálaigh, former Chief Justice of Ireland and, later, the fifth President of Ireland, in Sneem Culture Park, County Kerry.

Herzog was also noted for pardoning the Shin Bet agents involved in the Kav 300 affair. He issued the pardons before they were to be tried in exchange for their retirement. This raised a public uproar but the Supreme Court of Israel ruled that it was legal.

President Herzog reduced the sentences of Menachem Livni, Uzi Sharbaf and Shaul Nir, members of the Jewish Underground, who were sentenced to life imprisonment for the 1984 murder of four Palestinians in the West Bank town of Hebron. Herzog reduced the sentences, first to 24 years, then to 15 years, and in 1989, to 10 years, which enabled the men to be released two years later on good behaviour.

Herzog was an opponent of Saddam Hussein's regime in Iraq, to which he referred to as a nest "of world terror". He said the world largely dismissed Israel's warnings that Baghdad was becoming a capital of world terrorism, adding that some Western countries helped Hussein develop into a military power.

== Commemoration ==
In 1998, the Ulster History Circle unveiled a commemorative blue plaque to Herzog at his birthplace on Cliftonpark Avenue, Belfast. The plaque was removed in August 2014 because it had been repeatedly vandalised with anti-Israel slogans. DUP councillor Brian Kingston said, "This is a shocking indication of the level of tension and anti-Semitism which currently exists in parts of Belfast."

A park is also named for him, Herzog Park, in Rathgar in south Dublin.

A major thoroughfare in Jerusalem, Shderot Hanassi Hashishi (Sixth President Boulevard), is named for him.

== Personal life ==
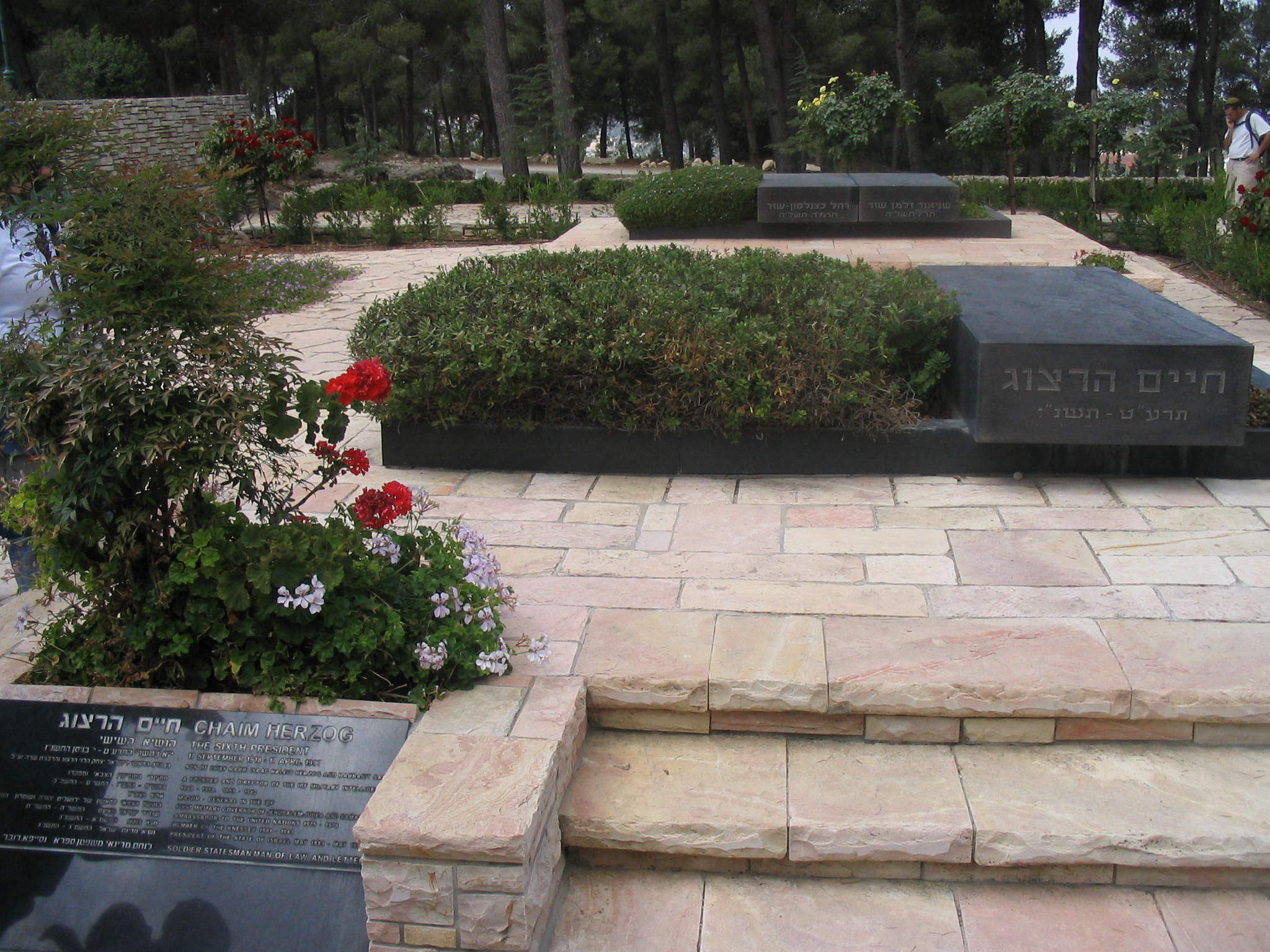
Herzog's grave on Mount Herzl

=== Family ===
Herzog's father was Yitzhak HaLevi Herzog, chief rabbi of Ireland and later Israel. His brother Yaakov Herzog served as Israel's ambassador to Canada and later as Director General of the Prime Minister's Office. He married Aura Ambache in 1947 and the couple had four children. One of their sons is Isaac Herzog, a politician who was the chairman of the Israeli Labor Party and chairman of the Jewish Agency and is now President of Israel, the first son of a president to serve as such. Another son, Michael Herzog, served as a general in the IDF and as Israeli ambassador to the United States. Their other children are Yoel, an attorney and former IDF Brigadier General, and Ronit, a clinical psychologist. His brother-in-law was diplomat Abba Eban, their wives being sisters.

=== Death ===
Herzog died on 17 April 1997 in Tel Aviv, from heart failure caused by pneumonia, at the age of 78. He is buried on Mount Herzl in Jerusalem.

== Works and publications ==
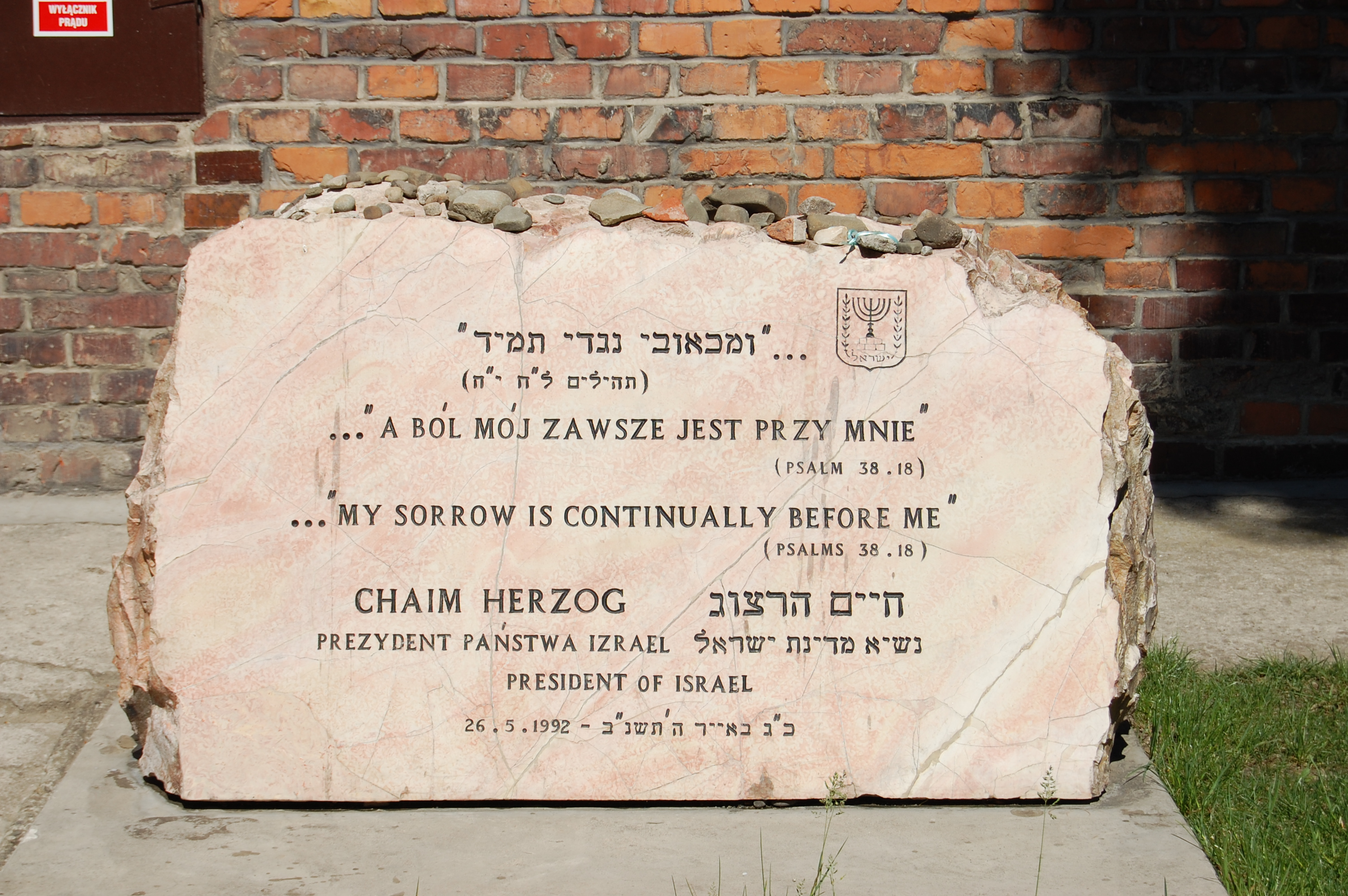
Herzog memorial stone in Auschwitz

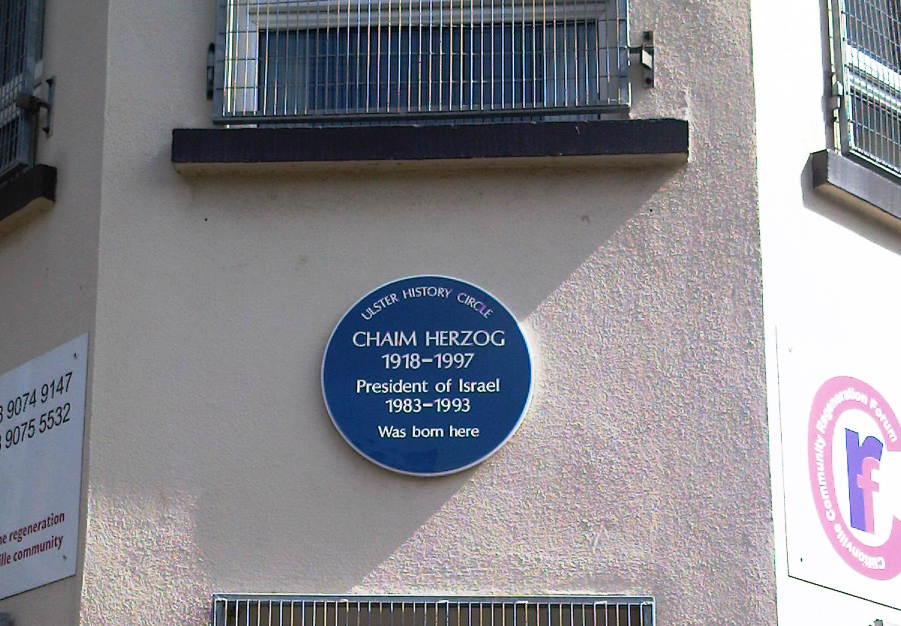
Plaque on the Belfast house in which Herzog was born, 2011

- Herzog, Chaim (1978). Who Stands Accused?: Israel Answers Its Critics. Random House. ISBN 978-0-394-50132-1. OCLC 3865344.
- Herzog, Chaim; Gazit, Shlomo (12 December 1983). The Arab-Israeli Wars: War and Peace in the Middle East from the 1948 War of Independence to the Present. Vintage. ISBN 978-1-4000-7963-6. OCLC 741355280.
- Herzog, Chaim (September 1989). Heroes of Israel: Profiles of Jewish Courage. Little Brown and Company. ISBN 978-0-316-35901-6. OCLC 19510435.
- Herzog, Chaim (12 November 1996). Living History: A Memoir. Pantheon. ISBN 978-0-297-81941-7. OCLC 36792752.
- Herzog, Chaim; Gichon, Mordechai (March 1997). Battles of the Bible: A Military History of Ancient Israel. Pantheon. ISBN 978-0-7607-7626-1. OCLC 71323946.
- Herzog, Chaim (March 1998). The War of Atonement: The Inside Story of the Yom Kippur War. Greenhill Books. ISBN 978-1-935149-13-2. OCLC 427612923.

Military offices
| Preceded by Haim Laskov | Head of Southern Command; 1958 | Succeeded by Avraham Yoffe |
Diplomatic posts
| Preceded by Yosef Tekoah | Permanent Representative of Israel to the United Nations; 1975–1978 | Succeeded by Yehuda Blum |
Political offices
| Preceded by Yitzhak Navon | President of Israel; 1983–1993 | Succeeded by Ezer Weizman |
