= Aura Herzog =

Israeli social and environmental activist (1924–2022)

- אורה הרצוג
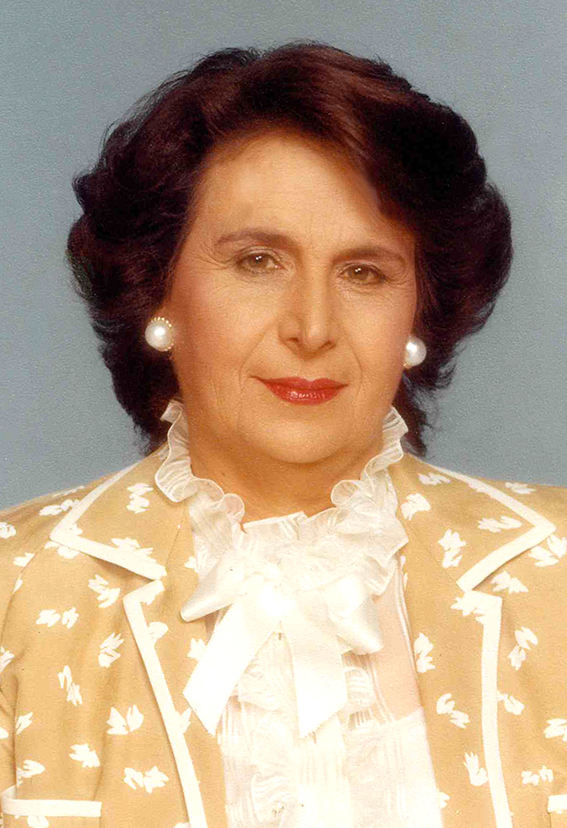
- Portrait of Aura Herzog

First Lady of Israel
- In role 5 May 1983 – 13 May 1993
- President: Chaim Herzog
- Preceded by: Ofira Navon
- Succeeded by: Reuma Weizman

Personal details
- Born: 24 December 1924 Ismailia, Egypt
- Died: 10 January 2022 (aged 97)
- Resting place: Mount Herzl, Jerusalem
- Spouse: Chaim Herzog (m. 1947; died 1997)
- Children: 4, including Isaac and Michael

Aura Herzog (Hebrew: אורה הרצוג (née Ambache, 24 December 1924 – 10 January 2022) was an Israeli social and environmental activist, who served as the First Lady of Israel from 1983 to 1993; she was the wife of Chaim Herzog, the sixth President of the State of Israel and mother of the current president, Isaac Herzog. In 1968, she founded the Council for a Beautiful Israel.

== Biography ==
=== Early life and work ===
Aura Ambache was born in Ismailia, Egypt, on 24 December 1924, to an Ashkenazi Jewish family of Russian Jewish and Polish Jewish descent. Her parents were Leah Steinberg (daughter of Yechiel Michal Steinberg, the founding family of Motza, a village on the outskirts of Jerusalem), and Simcha Ambache (Hebrew acronym for ani ma'amin b'emunah shleima - I believe in complete faith), an engineer by profession. Aura's sister Suzy married Israeli diplomat Abba Eban.

The family was originally from Jaffa, but relocated to Egypt after they were expelled by the Turks during World War I. Herzog attended French schools in Ismailia and Cairo and completed her BA in mathematics and physics at the University of Witwatersrand, South Africa.

In October 1946, Herzog immigrated to Mandatory Palestine. The following year, she was chosen to participate in the first class of the Diplomatic School established by the Jewish Agency. She was a member of the Haganah, a Jewish paramilitary organization in the British Mandate of Palestine (1921–48). In 1947, she married Chaim Herzog and the couple had four children: Yoel (born 1950), an attorney and former Brigadier General; Michael (born 1952), a former Israeli Ambassador to the United States; Isaac (born 1960), the current President of Israel; and Ronit (born 1968), a clinical psychologist.

On 11 March 1948, she was seriously injured in a bombing attack on the Jewish Agency building in the National Institutions House in Jerusalem. During the 1948 Palestine war she served as an intelligence officer in the newly founded Science Corps and intelligence department Number 2 (Unit 8200).

=== Diplomatic career and public service ===
From 1950 to 1954, she accompanied her husband to the United States, where he was sent as a military attache, and again from 1975 to 1978, when he served as ambassador to the United Nations.

In 1958, Herzog headed the committee that organized Israel's 10th anniversary celebrations and initiated the first International Bible Contest, which takes place annually on Israel Independence Day.

From 1959 to 1968, she headed the Department of Culture in the Ministry of Education and Culture and was a member of the Council for Arts and Culture. In 1969, she founded the Council for a Beautiful Israel, a leading environmental protection NGO and chaired it for 38 years, after which she became its international president.

After the end of her husband's presidency and her own tenure as first lady, she held various positions: Chairperson of the Public Committee for the celebration of Israel's Jubilee celebration (1998), Member of the Public Advisory Board of Mifal Hapayis (Israel's national lottery), Member of the Board of Governors of the Tel Aviv Museum, and Chairperson of Friends of Schneider association at Schneider Children's Medical Center of Israel.

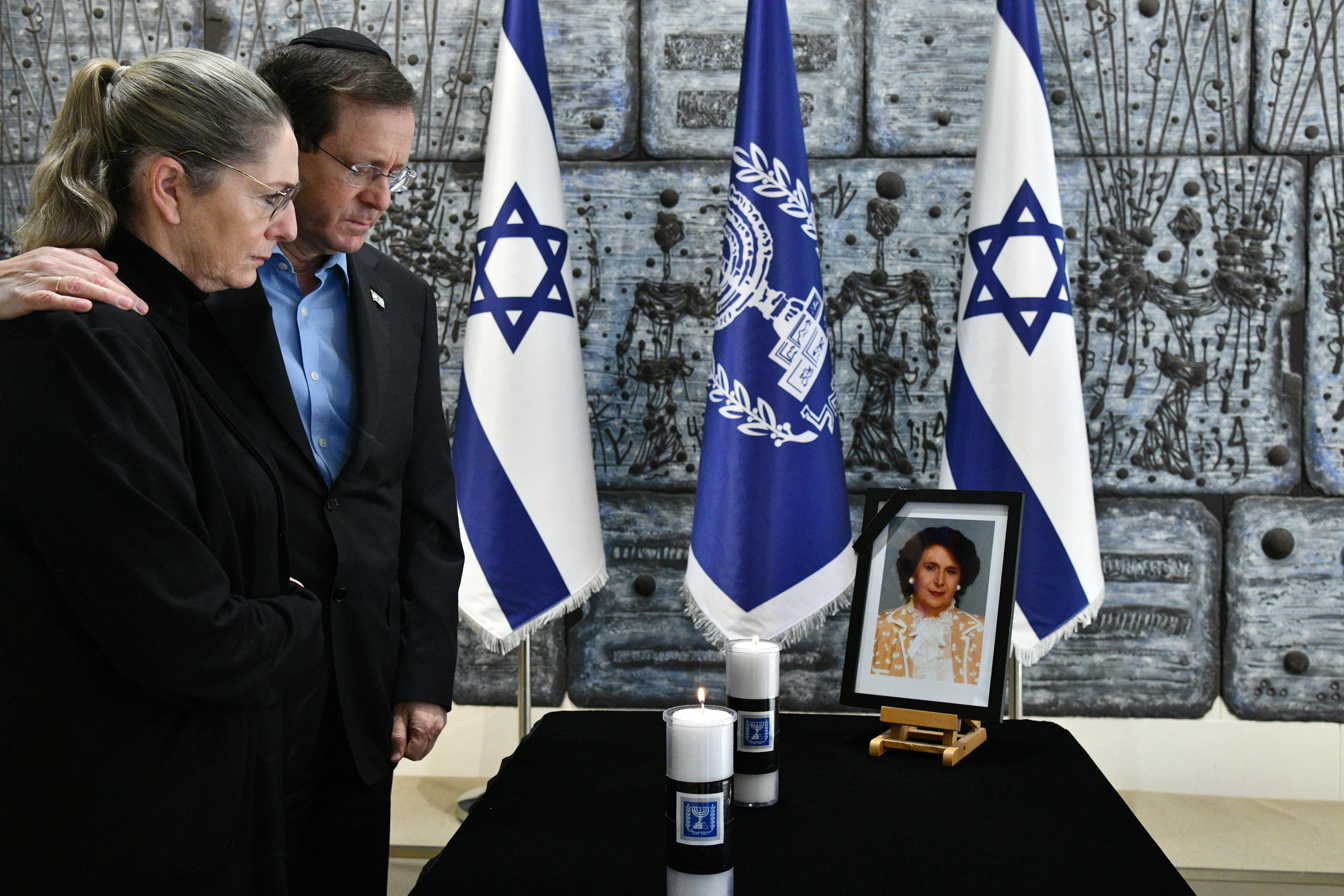
President Isaac Herzog and his wife Michal paying respects at the President's Residence ahead of the funeral of Aura Herzog

=== Later life ===
Aura Herzog died on 10 January 2022, at the age of 97. She is buried alongside her husband and a number of other Israeli leaders in Jerusalem’s Mount Herzl national cemetery. In his eulogy, her son President Isaac Herzog paid tribute to her as “an extremely loving mother for all of us, a source of strength, an engine with incredible energies.”

== Published works ==
In 1971, she published "Secrets of Hospitality," a manual on hospitality, manners and customs.

Honorary titles
Preceded by Ofira Navon	First Lady of Israel; 1983–1993	Succeeded by Reuma Weizman
