= Yitzhak HaLevi Herzog =

First Chief Rabbi of Ireland and Israel (1888–1959)

Rabbi Yitzhak HaLevi Herzog יִצְחָק הַלֵּוִי הֶרְצוֹג
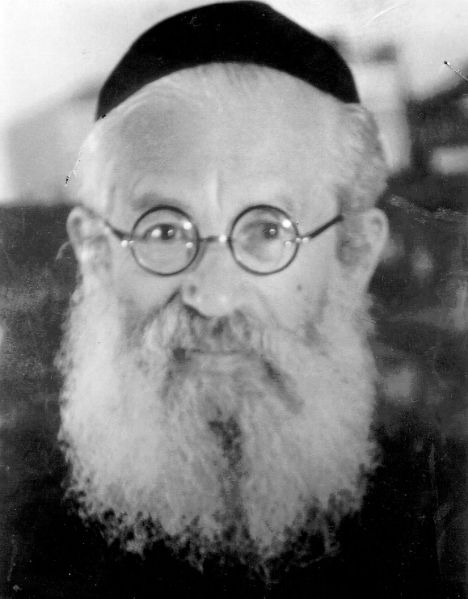
- Herzog in 1945
- Title: Ashkenazi Chief Rabbi of Israel

Personal life
- Born: 3 December 1888 Łomża, Poland
- Died: 25 July 1959 (aged 70) Jerusalem, Israel
- Buried: Sanhedria Cemetery, Jerusalem, Israel
- Spouse: Sarah Herzog
- Children: Chaim Herzog; Yaakov Herzog
- Occupation: Rabbi

Religious life
- Religion: Judaism
- Denomination: Orthodox

Jewish leader
- Successor: Isser Yehuda Unterman (in Israel)
- Began: 1948
- Ended: 1959
- Other: Chief Rabbi of Ireland (1919–1936); Ashkenazi Chief Rabbi of the British Mandate of Palestine (1936–1948)

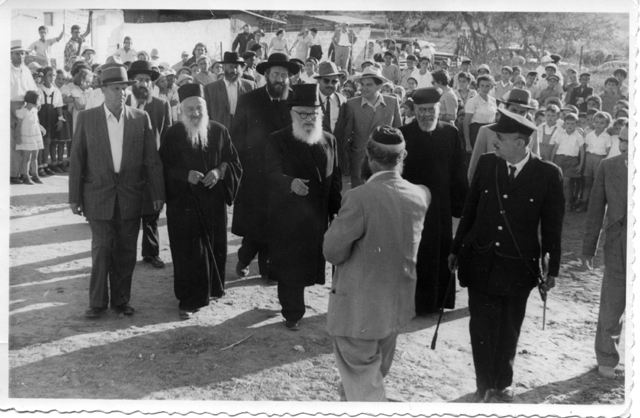
A visit to Ashkelon by Rishon Lezion Rabbi Yitzhak Nissim and Ashkenazi Chief Rabbi Isaac Herzog (1955)

Yitzhak HaLevi Herzog (Hebrew: יִצְחָק הַלֵּוִי הֶרְצוֹג; 3 December 1888 – 25 July 1959), also known as Isaac Herzog or Hertzog, was the first Chief Rabbi of Ireland, his term lasting from 1921 to 1936. From 1936 until his death in 1959, he was Ashkenazi Chief Rabbi of the British Mandate of Palestine and of Israel after its creation in 1948. He was the father of Chaim Herzog and grandfather of Isaac Herzog, both presidents of Israel.

== Early life ==
Yitzhak Halevi Herzog was born at Łomża in Russian Poland, the son of Liba Miriam (Cyrowicz) and Joel Leib Herzog. In 1898 he moved with his family to the United Kingdom, where they settled in Leeds. His initial schooling was largely at the instruction of his father who was a rabbi in Leeds and then later for the Polish Jewish community in Paris.

Herzog later moved to Ireland and became a fluent Irish speaker. He was known as "the Sinn Féin Rabbi" for his support of the First Dáil and the Irish republican cause during the Irish War of Independence. Herzog was involved with the Federation of Zionist Youth and Habonim Dror, the Zionist Labour movement, during his teenage years.

== Rabbinic career ==
Herzog was ordained as a rabbi in 1910 by the Rabbi of Safad. He served as rabbi of Belfast from 1915 to 1919 and was appointed rabbi at Dublin in 1919. He was a fluent Irish speaker. He served as Chief Rabbi of Ireland between either 1921 or 1925 and 1936. During his time in office, the Greenville Hall Synagogue was opened, and the Adelaide Road Synagogue extended. Herzog had positive relations with W. T. Cosgrave and was friendly with Éamon de Valera, who consulted him when he was designing the new Irish constitution. After Herzog's appointment in Palestine, a multi-party farewell event was arranged in Dublin's Mansion House.

In 1935 he visited Palestine for the first time with a strong desire to settle there. In 1936, he immigrated to Palestine; he was elected to succeed rabbi Abraham Isaac Kook as Ashkenazi Chief Rabbi of British Mandate of Palestine upon Kook's death. He settled in Jerusalem. He was a supporter of both the Irish Republican Army (IRA) and the Irgun.

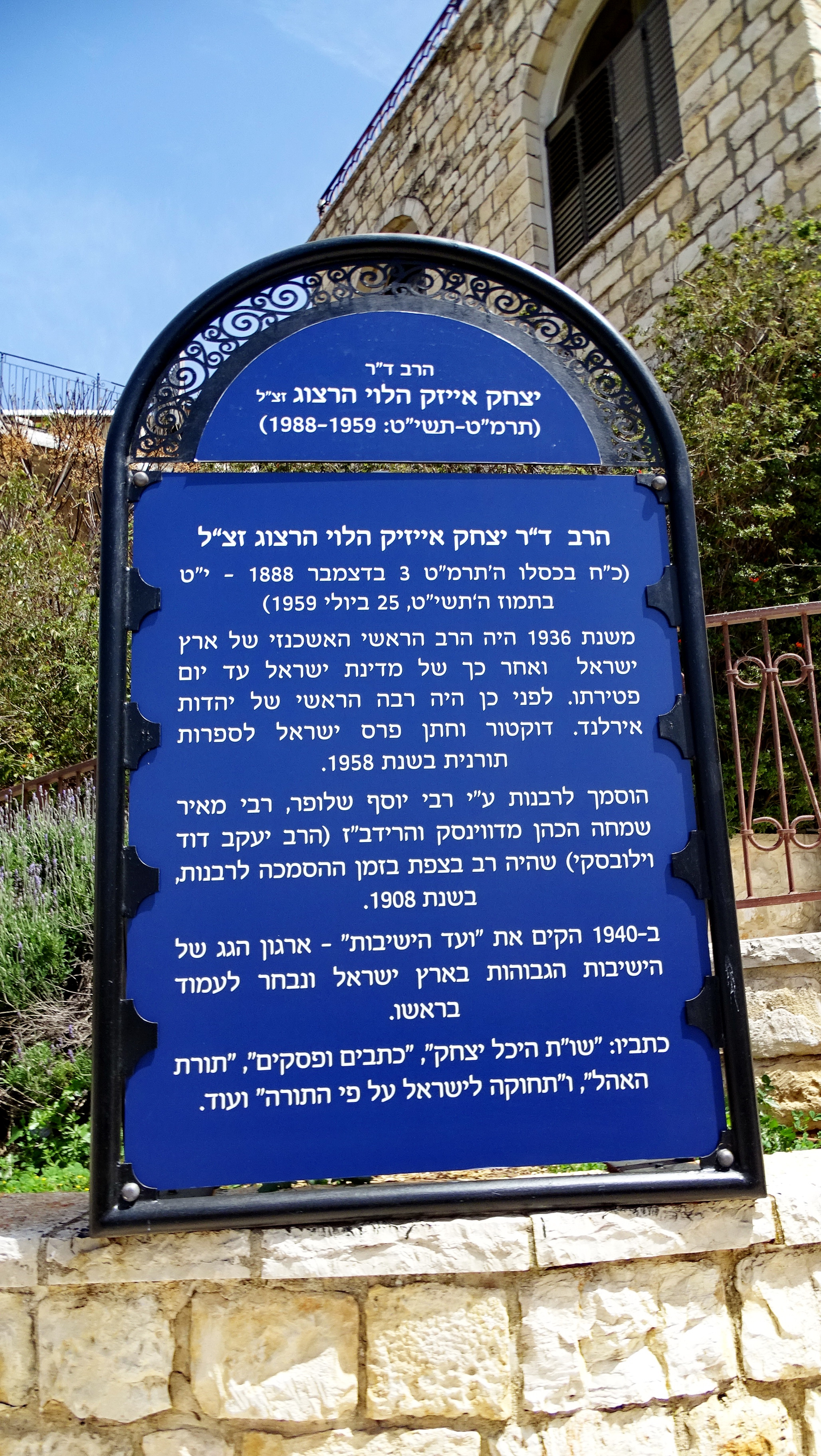
Sign commemorating rabbi Herzog, in the Artists' quarter of Safed, near Beit Castel gallery

In 1936, he testified in front of the Peel Commission in London and participated in 1939 in the London Conference of 1939 between Jews and Arabs from Mandatory Palestine, convened by the British government. In May 1939, shortly before the Second World War, the British put out the White Paper of 1939 restricting Jewish immigration to Palestine. After leading a procession through the streets of Jerusalem, on the steps of the Hurva Synagogue Herzog turned and said: "We cannot agree to the White Paper. Just as the prophets did before me, I hereby rip it in two." Some 40 years later, on 10 November 1975 Chaim Herzog repeated his father's gesture with the UN resolution that Zionism is equal to racism.

During the Arab Revolt, he called, together with other rabbis, for adherence to the Havlagah policy of the Haganah and for avoidance of acts of revenge. He became Chief Rabbi of Israel on the formation of the State of Israel in 1948.

== Death and legacy ==
Herzog died on 25 July 1959. His funeral was attended by thousands, including all members of the Israeli cabinet except the Prime Minister, who sent a personal message to Herzog's widow, along with representatives of the labour movement and the professions, members of the Supreme Court and the diplomatic corps. Chaim Herzog spoke the kaddish; Yaakov Herzog was unable to be present due to the Sabbath but sat shivah in Washington D.C. At least four rabbis, including both the Ashkenazi and Sephardi Chief Rabbis, delivered eulogies. A week of national mourning followed.

He is buried in the Sanhedria Cemetery in Jerusalem.

== Personal life and family legacy ==
In 1917, Herzog married Sarah Hillman, daughter of Rabbi S. I. Hillman of London, and they had two sons, Chaim, born in Belfast in 1919, and Yaakov (Jacob), born in Dublin in 1921.

Yitzhak Herzog's descendants have continued to be active in Israel's political life. His son Chaim rose to be a general in the Israel Defense Forces and was later appointed ambassador of Israel to the UN; he subsequently served as sixth President of Israel. Yitzhak's other son, Yaakov, served as Israel's ambassador to Canada and later as Director General of the Prime Minister's Office. He also accepted an offer to become Chief Rabbi of the British Commonwealth but due to ill health never took up that role.

As of 2026, his grandson Isaac Herzog is the President of Israel. He also previously served as a member of the Knesset, Israel's parliament, and head of the opposition. He previously served as housing and tourism minister and minister of welfare and later was chairman of the Jewish Agency.

== Scholarship ==
After mastering Talmudic studies at a young age, Herzog pursued wide-ranging academic interests. In 1897, he studied oriental languages at the Sorbonne in Paris, followed by work at Leeds in England. He matriculated at the University of London in 1905, and graduated with a Bachelor of Arts in classical and modern languages and mathematics in 1909. He secured a Masters of Arts in Semitics from the University of London in 1911, and a doctorate in literature from the same university in 1914. His doctoral thesis, which made him famous in the Jewish world, concerned his claim of re-discovering tekhelet, the type of blue dye once used for the making of tzitzit.

=== Published works ===
Herzog was recognised as a great rabbinical authority, and he wrote many books and articles dealing with halachic problems surrounding the Torah and the State of Israel. Indeed, his writings helped shape the attitude of the Religious Zionist Movement toward the State of Israel. Herzog authored:

- Main Institutions of Jewish Law
- Heichal Yitzchak
- Techukah leYisrael al pi haTorah
- Pesachim uKetavim
- The Royal Purple and the Biblical Blue

== Awards and recognition ==
- In 1958, Herzog was awarded the Israel Prize, in rabbinical literature.

== See also ==
- History of the Jews in Ireland
- History of the Jews in Northern Ireland
- Herzog (disambiguation)
- Shmuel Wosner
- List of Israel Prize recipients

Jewish titles
New title	Chief Rabbi of Ireland; 192?–1936	Succeeded by Immanuel Jakobovits
Preceded by Abraham Isaac Kook	Ashkenazi Chief Rabbi of Mandatory Palestine; 1936–1948	Position abolished
New title	Ashkenazi Chief Rabbi of Israel; 1948–1959	Succeeded by Isser Yehuda Unterman
