= Delta Phi Epsilon (social) =

International collegiate sorority

- ΔΦΕ
- Founded: March 17, 1917; 109 years ago New York University School of Law
- Type: Social
- Affiliation: NPC
- Status: Active
- Scope: International
- Motto: Esse Quam Videri "To Be Rather Than to Seem to Be"
- Pillars: Justice, Sisterhood, and Love
- Colors: Royal Purple Pure Gold
- Flower: Purple Iris
- Jewel: Pearl
- Mascot: Unicorn
- Publication: The Triad
- Philanthropy: National Association of Anorexia Nervosa and Associated Disorders (ANAD); Cystic Fibrosis Foundation; The Delta Phi Epsilon Educational Foundation
- Chapters: 109 active
- Members: 67,000+ lifetime
- Nickname: DPhiE, Deeph, Deephers
- Headquarters: 251 S. Camac Street; Philadelphia, Pennsylvania 19107; United States
- Website: dphie.org

Delta Phi Epsilon (ΔΦΕ or DPhiE) is a sorority founded on March 17, 1917, at New York University Law School in Manhattan. It is one of 26 social sororities that form the National Panhellenic Conference. It has 109 active chapters, two of which are located in Canada, making the sorority an international organization.

== History ==
Delta Phi Epsilon Sorority was established on March 17, 1917, at the New York University School of Law, then known as Washington Square College Law, in New York City, New York. Its five founders were Sylvia Steierman Cohn, Ida Bienstock Landau, Minna Goldsmith Mahler, Eva Effron Robin, and Dorothy Cohen Schwartzman.

A factor in founding the sorority was to create one accepting of all races and religions, and they were the first non-sectarian social sorority to do so. These five women, collectively called the DIMES by the sorority as an abbreviation of their first names (Dorothy, Ida, Minna, Eva, and Sylvia), wanted to "promote good fellowship among the women students among the various colleges in the country...to create a secret society composed of these women based upon their good moral character, regardless of nationality or creed...to have distinct chapters at various colleges".

Five years later, in 1922, Delta Phi Epsilon was officially incorporated under the state laws of New York and that same year became an international sorority by placing its Epsilon chapter at McGill University in Canada. In 1947, it became an associate member of the National Panhellenic Conference, becoming a full member in 1951.

As of 2021, there are more than 67,000 members of Delta Phi Epsilon. Its headquarters are in Philadelphia, Pennsylvania.

== Symbols ==
Delta Phi Epsilon's motto is Esse Quam Videri or "To be rather than to seem to be". Its founding principles or pillars are justice, sisterhood, and love.

The Delta Phi Epsilon badge is a gold equilateral triangle, with the Greek letters "ΔΦΕ" in gold on black onyx surrounded by 21 pearls. Below the triangle is a ribbon with the motto Esse Quam Videri. Its new member pin is a purple enamel triangle with the Greek letters "ΔΦΕ" in gold.

The sorority's colors are royal purple and pure gold. Its flower is the purple iris. Its mascot is the Unicorn. Its jewel is the pearl. The sorority's publication is The Triad.

== Philanthropies ==
Delta Phi Epsilon is partnered with several international philanthropies via its Delta Phi Epsilon Educational Foundation: the Cystic Fibrosis Foundation and the National Association of Anorexia Nervosa and Associated Disorders.

The Delta Phi Epsilon Educational Foundation, established in 1966 to honor Delta Phi Epsilon's Golden Anniversary, helps members and their children further their education through scholarships, grants, and loans. The foundation also supports sorority education and volunteer training initiatives.

The Cystic Fibrosis Foundation aids those with the genetic disease cystic fibrosis (CF) through research, grants, and awareness campaigns. Founded by Phyllis Kossoff, a member of the sorority's Delta chapter at Hunter College, and other concerned parents, the Cystic Fibrosis Foundation became the leader in raising funding for research and raising awareness for the disease. At the sorority's December 1957 Convention, Phyllis petitioned her sisters to have the sorority adopt CFF as its official philanthropy. Chapters across North America raise money and awareness. Many chapters host a fundraising event known as Deepher Dude, which is a male dance competition.

Some chapters fill tote bags, called Tate's Totes, with various items that make an extended hospital stay more comfortable for children with cystic fibrosis and their parents. These totes are then taken to Cystic Fibrosis Foundation Care Centers for distribution. Tate's Totes was started by past International president Donna Von Bruening (Sigma chapter at Ohio State University) shortly after taking office, after her nephew Tate had been diagnosed with cystic fibrosis. Other chapters host the 65 Roses Gala events. 65 roses are significant to children with the disease since the word "cystic fibrosis" is difficult for a child to say. Since 1957, Delta Phi Epsilon has raised millions of dollars for CFF. At the 2016 International Leadership Forum, Delta Phi Epsilon Sorority gave its largest single donation to date of $471,060.

The sorority's other philanthropic partner is the National Association of Anorexia Nervosa and Associated Disorders, which provides resources and education to fight anorexia and other eating disorders. Each chapter sponsors an annual eating disorder awareness week on their campus to increase awareness of eating disorders and provide information to family and friends of sufferers.

== Membership ==
As with all National Panhellenic Conference (NPC) sororities, women may join Delta Phi Epsilon if they attend as an undergraduate at a university with an active chapter from which they receive a membership offer. Before graduation, the sorority's programming focuses on five areas: sisterhood, scholarship, self, service, and social. Members of the sorority must follow the three core values: Justice, sisterhood, and love. After graduation, the programming for alumnae moves to five other areas: character, civic, cultural, connection, and career.

In 2017, the sorority adopted a trans and gender non-binary inclusion policy, that is specifies that trans women and non-binary individuals are welcome to its membership.

== Chapters ==
It has 109 active chapters, two of which are located in Canada.

== Notable members ==
- Stephanie Abrams (Delta Kappa) – meteorologist for The Weather Channel
- Barbara Aronstein Black (Phi) – dean of Columbia Law School; first woman to head an Ivy League law school
- Aimee Boorman – head coach of the United States women's gymnastics team at the 2016 Summer Olympics
- Barbara Boxer (Phi) – U.S. Senator for California
- Susan Davis (Delta Zeta) – U.S. Representative, 53rd District, California
- Lee Ducat (Nu) – founder of the Juvenile Diabetes Foundation
- Meredith Eaton (Epsilon Rho) – actor who stars in multiple television shows, including NCIS, NCIS New Orleans, and Macgyver
- Jackie Goldberg (Delta Zeta) – California State Assembly, 45th District
- Judith Heumann (Upsilon) – assistant secretary of the Office of Special Education & Rehabilitation Services, US Department of Education
- Ofira Navon (Psi) – former First Lady of Israel
- Judith Rodin (Nu) – president of the Rockefeller Foundation, president of the University of Pennsylvania, and the first permanent female president of an Ivy League university
- Jan Schakowsky (Rho) – U.S. Congresswoman, 9th District, Illinois
- Susan Polis Schutz (Delta Sigma) – poet, creator of Blue Mountain greeting cards

== See also ==
- Pi Sigma Psi, former chapter at Dartmouth College
- List of Jewish fraternities and sororities
- List of social sororities and women's fraternities
