= Hava Pinhas-Cohen =

Israeli writer and poet (1955–2022)

- חוה פנחס-כהן
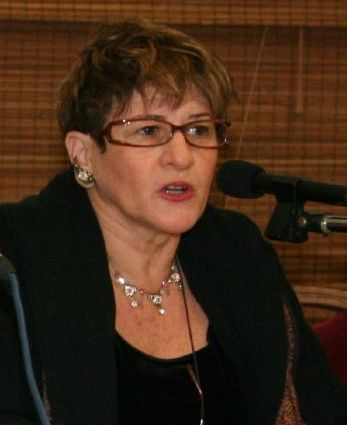
- Born: 18 January 1955; Jaffa, Israel
- Died: 29 October 2022 (aged 67); Jerusalem, Israel
- Education: Hebrew University of Jerusalem; Shalom Hartman Institute
- Occupations: Writer, poet
- Awards: Prime Minister's Prize for Hebrew Literary Works (1995); ACUM award (1998); Kugel Prize (2000); Ramat Gan Prize for Literature (2013); Dr. Gardner Simon Prize for Hebrew Poetry (2022)

Hava Pinhas-Cohen (Hebrew: חוה פנחס-כהן; 18 January 1955 – 29 October 2022) was an Israeli writer and poet. Her work explored themes such as the State of Israel, Judaism, and eroticism. She served as the Editor-in-Chief of the literary journal Dimui and a translator, columnist, and book reviewer for Maariv.

== Early life ==
Hava Pinhas-Cohen was born to a Jewish family of Bulgarian immigrants in 1955. Her family fled Europe in the aftermath of World War II. Pinhas-Cohen was the first member of her family to be born in Israel.

According to Yaniv Hagbi, in a comment translated from Hebrew to English, "Her experiences, the state of Israel, Judaism, eroticism, and the Tanakh are remarkably woven together in the tapestry of her work." Pinchas-Cohen and her four daughters lived in Jerusalem.

== Job background ==
Pinhas-Cohen was a poet, editor and a lecturer of literature and art. In 1989 she founded and edited the Jewish literature, art and culture journal Dimui. "Her poems have been translated and appear in various anthologies in English, French, Serbian-Croatian, Chinese, Greek, and Spanish." Some of her works are Mostly Color, Journey of the Doe, River and Forgetfulness, Orphea’s Poems The Gardener, the Bitch and the Slut, A school of one man, and My Brother, the thirst. In 2007 she founded and became the Artistic Director of Kisufim, a conference of Jewish writers. It has had three successful festivals, the years being 2007, 2009 and 2013.

== Later life and death ==
Hava Pinhas-Cohen studied Hebrew literature and art history at the Hebrew University of Jerusalem. She taught literature and written proficiency in high school for many years, and developed a special method of integrating literature, Bible, visual arts and cinema. From 1990, she was the Editor-in-Chief of Dimui, a journal of literature, criticism and Jewish culture. She was also a book reviewer, translator, and columnist for the daily newspaper Maariv.

Pinhas-Cohen died on 29 October 2022, at the age of 67.

== Works of literature ==
- Dimui
- Mostly Color
- Journey of the Doe
- River and Forgetfulness
- Orphea’s Poems
- The Gardener, the Bitch and the Slut
- A School of One Man
- My Brother, the Thirst

== Awards and recognition ==
- Prime Minister's Prize (1996)
- The ACUM Prize (1998)
- The Kugel Prize (Haim Kugel Literary Award of the Municipality of Holon; 2000)
- The Alterman Prize (2002)
- The Ramat Gan Prize (2013)
- The Rishon LeZion Prize for Creativity in Hebrew Language (2015)
- The First Lady of the State of Israel Prize for Hebrew Poetry (2022)

== See also ==
- Ada Aharoni
- Karen Alkalay-Gut
- Raquel Chalfi
- Janice Rebibo
- Naomi Shemer
- Yona Wallach
- Zelda (poet)

== Sources ==
- "Hava Pinchas-Cohen". Hava Pinchas-Cohen.
- "Israeli Poetess Pinhan Cohen".
- "Reviews and Interviews".
