= The First Lady of the State of Israel Prize for Hebrew Poetry =

First Lady of the State of Israel Prize for Hebrew Poetry
- Location: Beit HaNassi, Jerusalem
- Country: Israel
- Presented by: First Lady of Israel
- Reward: ₪50,000
- First award: 2018

The First Lady of the State of Israel Prize for Hebrew Poetry (formerly known as the Dr. Gardner Simon Prize for Hebrew Poetry and the Nechama Rivlin Memorial Dr. Gardner Simon Award for Hebrew Poetry) is an Israeli literary award for Hebrew poetry. The prize is awarded on behalf of the spouse of the president of Israel - First Lady of Israel at an official ceremony held at the President’s Residence in Jerusalem.

== About the Prize ==
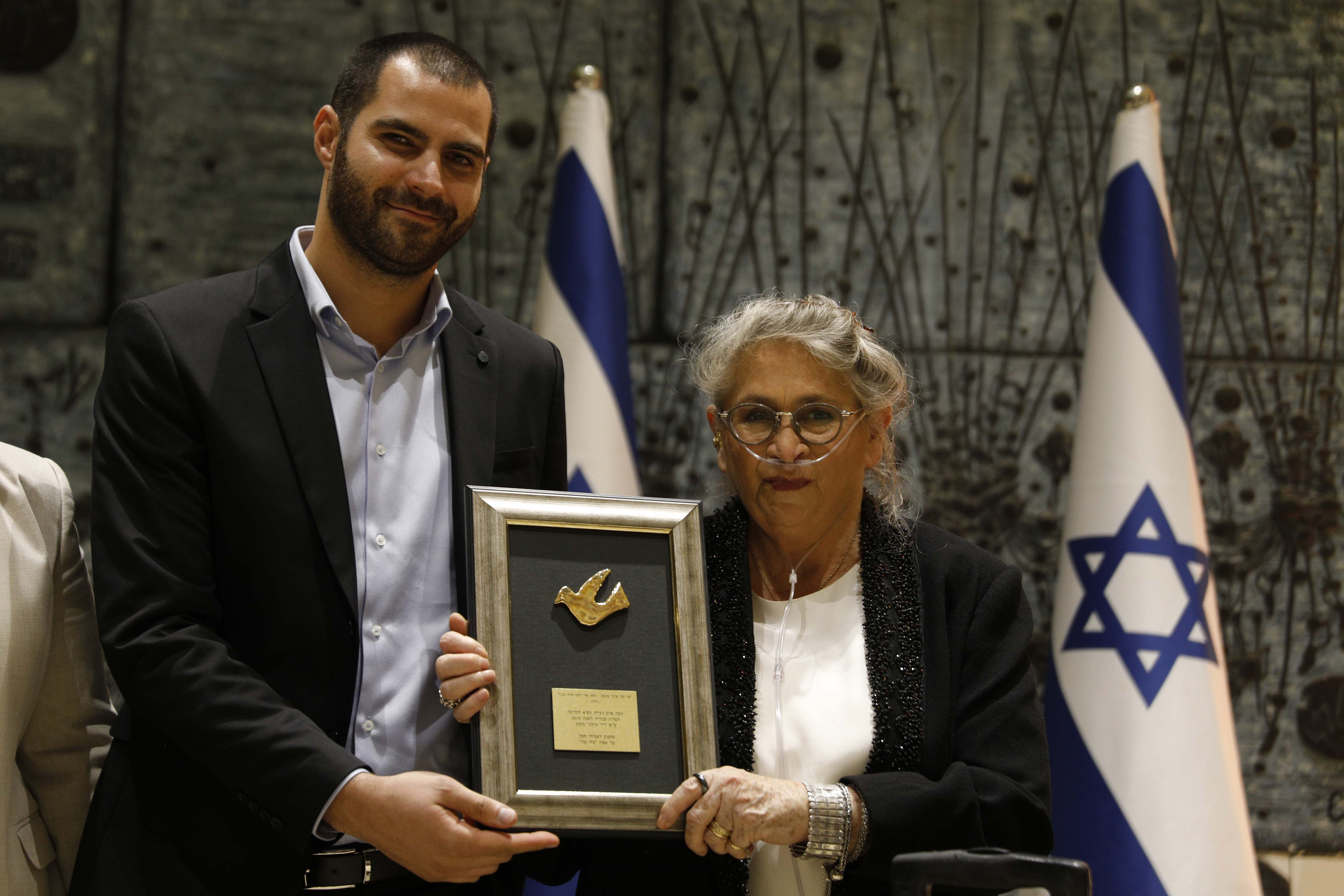
Nechama Rivlin presents The First Lady of the State of Israel Prize for Hebrew Poetry for the year 2018, to the poet Amichai Chasson for his book «Bli Ma».

The prize was established in 2018, in honor of the 70th anniversary of the State of Israel, by the Administrator General of the State of Israel together with Nechama Rivlin, the spouse of President Reuven Rivlin, in memory of Dr. Gardner Simon, a British Jewish physician. In his will, Dr. Simon dedicated part of his estate to the State of Israel for the purpose of supporting and promoting the Hebrew language.

In its inaugural year, the prize amount was ₪70,000. In subsequent years, the prize has been awarded in the amount of ₪50,000.

Following the passing of Nechama Rivlin, the prize was renamed in her memory at the initiative of Michal Herzog, the spouse of President Isaac Herzog.

Among the poets who have received the prize over the years are: Amichai Chasson, Rita Kogan, Eli Eliyahu, Rafi Weichert, Hava Pinhas-Cohen, and Shachar-Mario Mordechai.

== See also ==
- First Lady of Israel
- The President of the State of Israel Prize for Literature
- Hebrew literature
- Israeli poetry
