= Hayim Tadmor =

Israeli assyriologist

- חיים תדמור
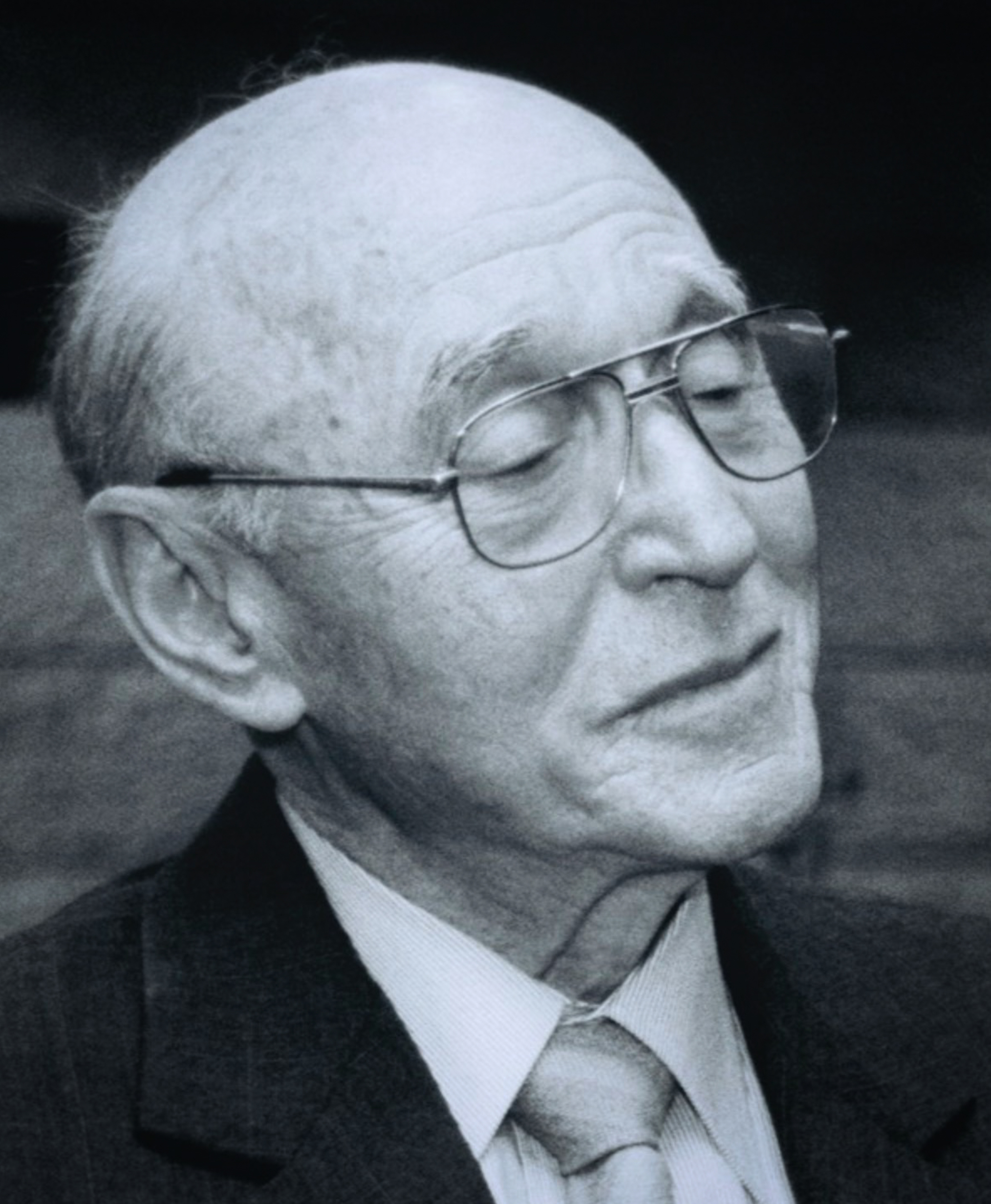
- Hayim Tadmor
- Born: 18 November 1923; Harbin, Manchuria, China
- Died: 11 December 2005 (aged 82); Jerusalem, Israel
- Education: Hebrew University; Institute for the Study of Ancient Cultures, University of Chicago
- Known for: Founder of Assyriology in Israel
- Spouse: Miriam Tadmor
- Children: 2
- Scientific career
- Fields: Assyriology, Biblical studies, Ancient history

Hayim Tadmor (born Frumstein) (Hebrew: חיים תדמור; November 18, 1923, Harbin, China–December 11, 2005, Jerusalem) was a leading Israeli Assyriologist. As a student of Benno Landsberger and Sidney Smith, his knowledge was grounded in immediate knowledge and experience that went back to the earliest years of Assyriology.

== Early life and education ==
Hayim Tadmor was born in Harbin, Manchuria, as Hayim Frumstein. His father, David, a fur trader, relocated to Manchuria once the trans-Siberian railway had been extended, having also travelled to Canada. In 1935, after his father’s death, Hayim emigrated with his mother to Mandatory Palestine, and completed his schooling in Jerusalem while also providing for his mother, working as a tutor in Mathematics and Hebrew Grammar. In 1943 he started his studies at the Hebrew University of Jerusalem specialising in Classics, Jewish History of the First and Second Temple periods, and Biblical History, which he studied with Benjamin Mazar. At the same time, he served in the Haganah.

== Early career ==
In 1950 he completed his MA. In 1951-1952 he obtained a British Council Scholarship to study Akkadian with Sidney Smith at the Department of Assyriology at SOAS. His doctoral dissertation submitted in 1954 elucidated biblical chronology in the light of Assyrian sources. In 1954 he travelled once more, further to specialise in Akkadian at the Oriental Institute of the University of Chicago, studying with Benno Landsberger. He returned to Israel and took up a post at the Hebrew University, from 1958 teaching Bible and Ancient Near Eastern History. In 1965 he established the department of Assyriology at the Hebrew University, which he chaired, and which became an international centre.

== Research ==
Combined specialisation in biblical history and Ancient Near Eastern History became the hallmark of Tadmor’s work. Tadmor read and spoke Hebrew, English, Russian, German, Akkadian, Babylonian and Sumerian. He published 57 articles mainly in Hebrew and English. His main book dealt with the Assyrian royal inscriptions of king Tiglath-pileser III, known as particularly difficult to decipher, since after their excavation in Nimrud in 1845 by A.H. Layard they were much vandalised. As early as 1963, whilst spending a sabbatical year in London, Tadmor was given access to Layard’s folio drawings at the British Museum and started reconstructing the texts. His book on the inscriptions was published in 1994. He also edited the Biblical Encyclopaedia vols. 6-8, and with Mordechai Cogan published a new translation and scholarly interpretation of the Second Book of Kings.

== Later career ==
He was appointed as a professor in 1971 and was elected to the Israel Academy of Sciences and Humanities in 1985. He was known for his excellent relationships with his students and numerous international collaborations, for example with students from Japan and Korea. He held visiting professorships at the universities of Yale, City University of New York, Michigan, Pennsylvania, and Berkeley. Having retired in 1994, he was elected vice-president of the Israel Academy in 1996, serving until 2004. In USA he was elected honorary member of the American Oriental Society and a Fellow of the Academy for Jewish Research. In 2000 he was awarded the Rothschild Prize for his life’s work. He received an honour from the Heilongjiang Academy of Social Sciences in Harbin. Two Festschriften appeared, one in his honour and another a joint tribute for him and his wife. Another volume was published in his memory by the Israel Academy. In 2010 his and his wife’s library was acquired by the Institute for the Study of the Ancient World of New York University, where it is available for readers. His papers are held at the Hebrew University Archive.

== Personal life ==
In 1953 Tadmor married Miriam Yehieli, née Skura, a fellow student and archaeologist. The couple had two children: Naomi and David.

== Publications ==
=== Books ===
- Tadmor, H.; Yamada, S. (2011). The Royal Inscriptions of Tiglath-Pileser III (744–727 BC) and Shalmaneser V (726–722 BC), Kings of Assyria (PDF). Eisenbrauns.
- The Inscriptions of Tiglath-pileser III, King of Assyria: Critical Edition with Introduction, Translations and Commentary, Jerusalem: The Israel Academy of Sciences and Humanities, 1994 (second printing with Addenda et Corrigenda 2007).
- II Kings: A New Translation with Introduction and Commentary. The Anchor Bible Commentaries, vol. XI, Bantam Doubleday Dell Publishing Group, 1988. Edited by Mordechai Cogan, Hayim Tadmor. ISBN 978-0-3001-4074-3
- H. Tadmor and M. Weinfeld (eds.), History, Historiography and Interpretation, Studies in Biblical and Cuneiform Literatures, The Magnes Press: the Hebrew University, Jerusalem, 1983. ISBN 965-223-459-1
