= Amichai Chasson =

Israeli poet, curator and filmmaker

- עמיחי חסון
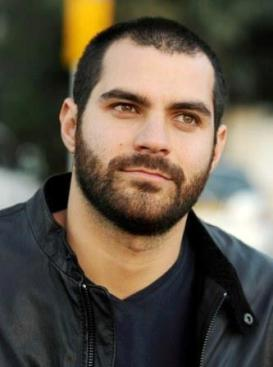
- Born: June 9, 1987 (age 39); Ramat Gan, Israel
- Education: Sam Spiegel Film and Television School
- Occupations: Poet, writer, film director, screenwriter, curator
- Writing career
- Language: Hebrew

Amichai Chasson (also Amichai Hasson, Hebrew: עמיחי חסון; born 1987) is an Israeli poet, curator and filmmaker. Since 2015, Chasson has served as the artistic director and chief curator at the Beit Avi Chai in Jerusalem.

== Biography ==
Amichai Chasson was born in Ramat Gan, Israel, in 1987, to an Orthodox Jewish family. His father is from Tripoli, Libya, and his mother, granddaughter of Samuel S. Bloom, is from New York City, United States. Chasson attended state-religious schools in Bnei Brak, and after Yeshiva High School, he moved to the hesder yeshiva in Yeshivat Otniel. He studied at the Sam Spiegel Film and Television School and the Mandel Leadership Institute in Jerusalem. He was Writer in Residence at Brandeis University in 2024–2025.

Chasson lives in the Katamon neighborhood of Jerusalem with his wife Dr. Miriam Chasson (sister of filmmaker Ori Elon and daughter of author Emuna Elon and rabbi Binyamin Elon). The couple has two sons and a daughter.

== Journalism and literary career ==
Chasson has worked as a journalist and literary critic for the papers Yedioth Ahronoth, Makor Rishon, and Maariv, and as a speechwriter for then President of Israel, Reuven Rivlin. He is an editor of the poetry journal Meshiv Haruach; and is a broadcaster for the public radio channel Kan Tarbut – Israeli Public Broadcasting Corporation ("Hitbodedut," a weekly discussion show together with Yair Assulin).

His first book of poetry, "Talking with Home" (Hebrew: מדבר עם הבית), was published in 2015, and won the Minister of Culture's prize that year. In 2018, his second book, "Bli ma" (Hebrew: בלי מה), was published by the veteran Bialik Institute Press. His poems often deal with the tension between his religious faith and artistic sensibilities, and stand on the border between cultures, identities, sources and places.

In 2018, Nechama Rivlin presented the First Lady's Prize and the Dr Gardner Simon Prize for Hebrew Poetry to Chasson for his book "Bli ma", at a ceremony at the President's Residence in Jerusalem. A year later, the book was placed on the shortlist of finalists for the Brenner Prize for poetry.

In 2013, Chasson co-directed the documentary film "Footsteps in Jerusalem", a tribute to the late Israeli documentary filmmaker David Perlov. In 2018, he released a documentary film about the poet Avoth Yeshurun, called "Yeshurun in 6 Chapters" (Hebrew: ישורון: 6 פרקי אבות), which premiered at the Docaviv International Documentary Film Festival that same year. He has written and directed a number of films and TV series, including "The Conductor" ("Hamenatzeach") and "Iron Dome" ("Kipat Barzel"). In 2019, he participated in the Intellectual Incubator for Documentary Filmmakers convention at the Van Leer Jerusalem Institute.

Chasson served in a number of public offices, including jury judge for the Sapir Prize in Literature in 2020, and in 2021 serving as a member of the Israel Film Council and Mifal HaPais Council for the Culture and Arts.

== Awards and recognition ==
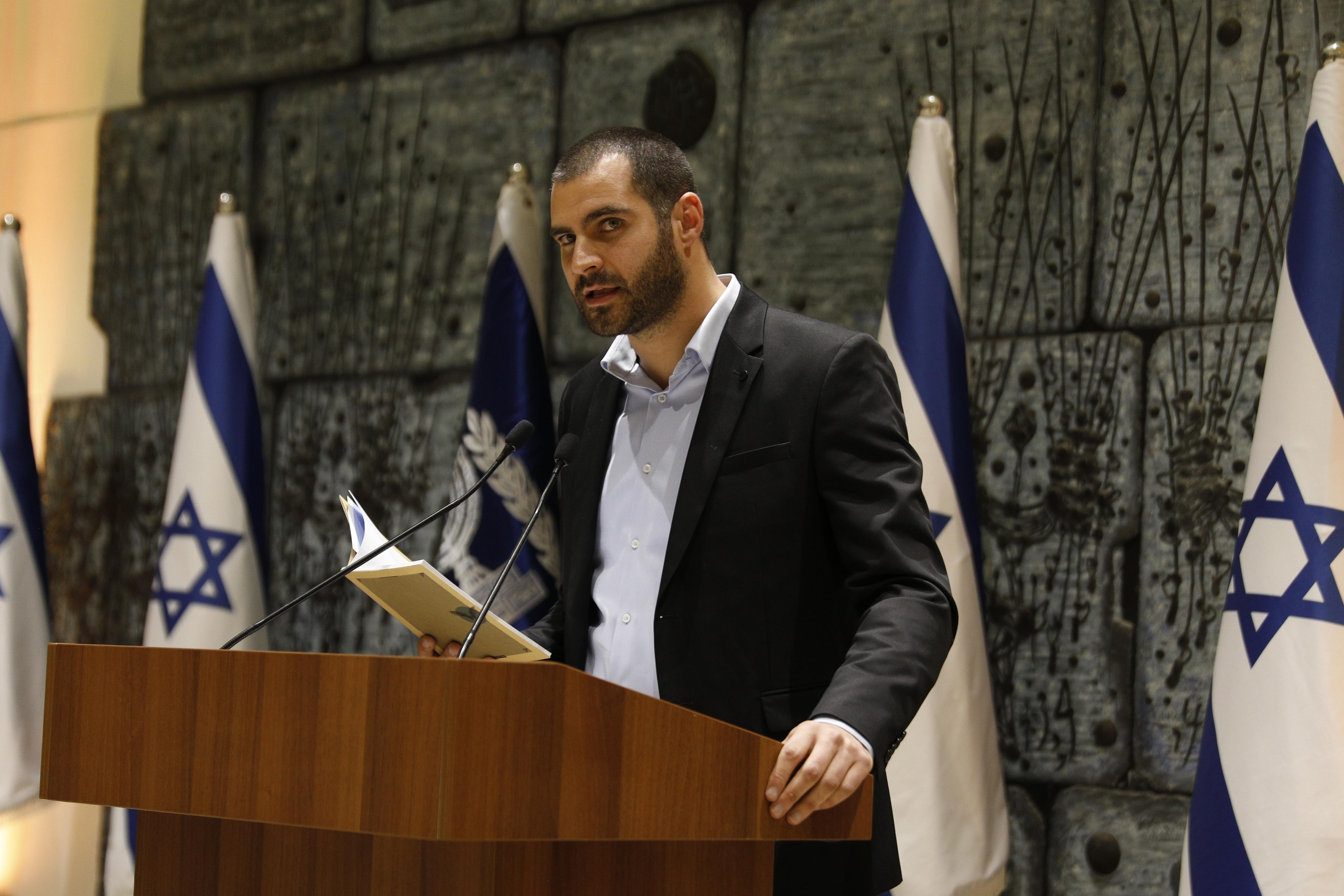
Amichai Chasson in a Beit HaNassi ceremony on December 19, 2018

- 2015 – Israeli Culture Ministry awards for Literature
- 2018 – The First Lady of the State of Israel Prize for Hebrew Poetry
- 2021 – Prime Minister's Prize for Hebrew Literary Works
- 2025 - The Yehuda Amichai Prize for Hebrew Poetry

== Published works ==
=== Poetry ===
- 2015 – Medaber eem ha bayit/Talking with Home (Even Hoshen Publishing)
- 2018 – Bli Ma/Emptiness (Kvar Series, Bialik Institute)
- 2022 – Shirim Al Saf/Liminal Poems (Kvar Series, Bialik Institute)

=== Edited books ===
- 2019 – Man walks in the world: conversations with Abraham Joshua Heschel (Yedioth Sfarim Publishing)
- 2017 - Nanopoetics: A Tribute to Allen Ginsberg (Poetry Place Publishing)
- 2015 - Respite on a Green Island: A Tribute to Zelda (Meshiv Haruach Publishing)
- 2014 - Company Required for the Holiday Season: Short Stories (IndiBook Publishing)

== Filmography ==
=== Director ===
- 2013 – Footsteps in Jerusalem: a tribute to In Jerusalem (Documentary film)
- 2016 – On the Six Day (graduation movie in Sam Spiegel Film School)
- 2018 – Yeshurun in 6 Chapters (Documentary film)

=== Screenwriter ===
- 2017 – Kipat Barzel (TV drama)
- 2018 – HaMenatzeah (TV drama)

== Curated exhibitions ==
- 2016 – Ronny Someck: Tow time Chai (exhibition and catalogue: curator and editor, Amichai Chasson), Beit Avi Chai, Jerusalem
- 2018 – Joel Kantor: Night Guard (exhibition and catalogue: curator and editor, Amichai Chasson), Beit Avi Chai, Jerusalem
- 2019 – Emerging from the shadows: the photographs of Sarah Ayal (exhibition and catalogue: curator and editor, Amichai Chasson), Beit Avi Chai and The Knesset, Jerusalem
- 2022 – Marek Yanai: On the Threshold (exhibition and catalogue: curator and editor, Amichai Chasson), Beit Avi Chai, Jerusalem
- 2023 – Anatoli Kaplan: The Enchanted Artist (exhibition Curator and catalogue editor: David Rozenson, Amichai Chasson), Beit Avi Chai, Jerusalem
- 2024 - Pinchas Litvinovsky: You Must Choose Life—That is Art (exhibition and catalogue: curator and editor, Amichai Chasson), Beit Avi Chai, Jerusalem
- 2025 - My Life at the Moment (exhibition and catalogue: curator and editor: Amichai Chasson & Rika Grinfeld-Barnea), Beit Avi Chai, Jerusalem
- 2025 - Aliza Auerbach: I Stood in Jerusalem (exhibition and catalogue: curator and editor: Amichai Chasson), Beit Avi Chai, Jerusalem
