= Bialik Institute =

Israeli research institution and publishing house

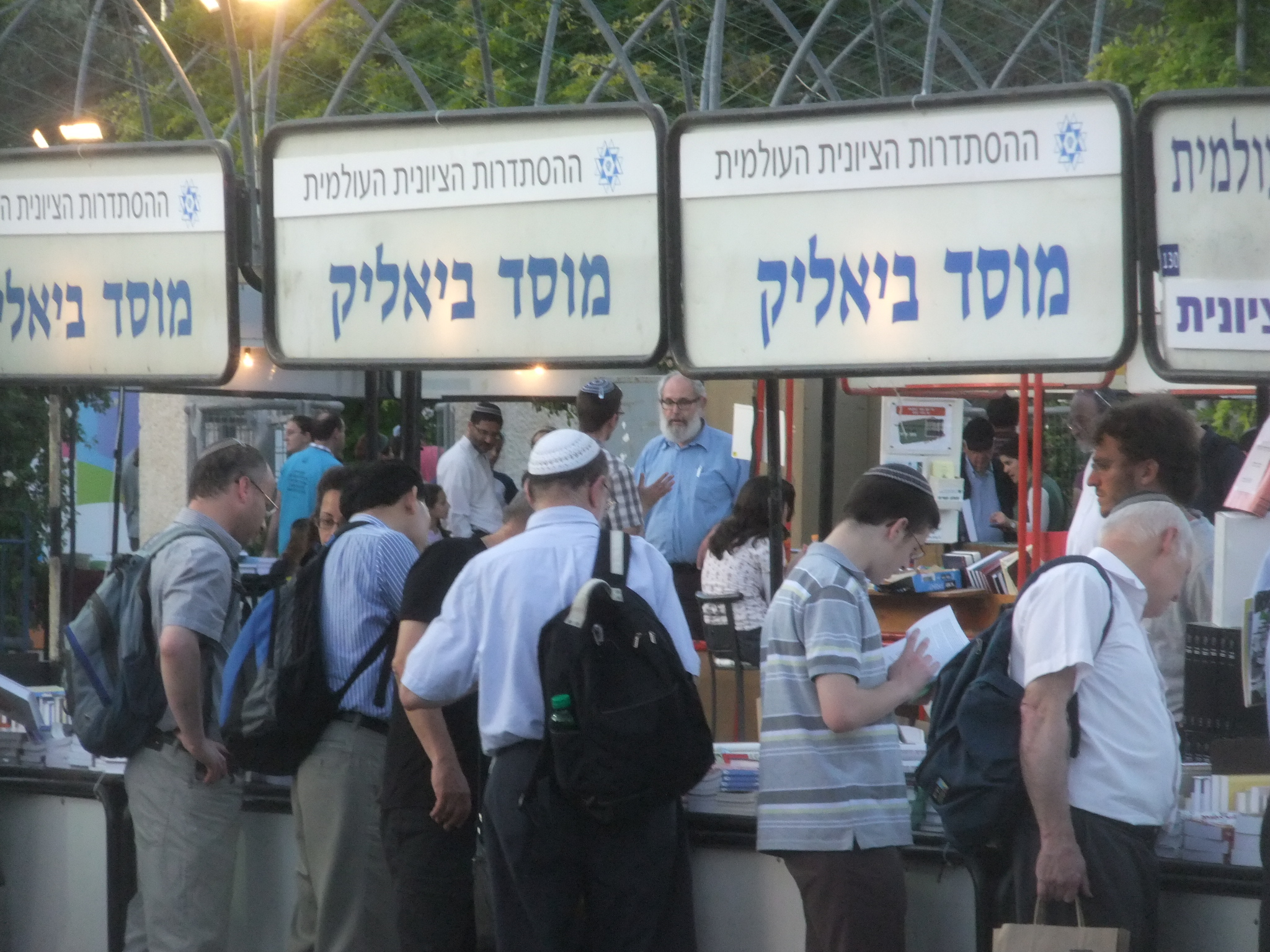
- Bialik institute at Hebrew Book Week 2013 fair in Jerusalem
- Native name: מוסד ביאליק
- Industry: Publishing House, Research Institution
- Founder: World Zionist Organization and Jewish Agency in 1935
- Products: Encyclopaedia Biblica, The Biblical Encyclopaedia Library
- Revenue: 4,950,939 new shekel (2024)
- Number of employees: 13 (2024)

Bialik Institute (Hebrew: מוסד ביאליק, romanized: Mosad Bialik) is a research institution and publishing house, mostly dealing with the history and culture of the Hebrew language. It was established in 1935 by the World Zionist Executive and the Executive of the Jewish Agency and named after the Hebrew poet Hayim Nahman Bialik. Its works are mostly published in Hebrew and in English.

Among the Bialik Institute's most notable publications are:

- Encyclopaedia Biblica - an encyclopedia of the Hebrew Bible in eight volumes (1942−1982), and The Biblical Encyclopaedia Library—a series of books on Semitic languages, Biblical criticism and history of the Middle East.
- A complete collection of David Avidan's poems in four volumes (2008−2011)
- A complete collection of Uri Zvi Grinberg's poems (1991)
- The Kvar Series of Modern Hebrew poetry, which includes, among others, the books of the poets Tuvya Ruebner, Nurit Zarchi, Israel Eliraz, Amichai Chasson, and Yakir Ben Moshe.
