= Vera Weizmann =

First Lady of Israel (1881–1966)

- ורה ויצמן; Вера Вейцман
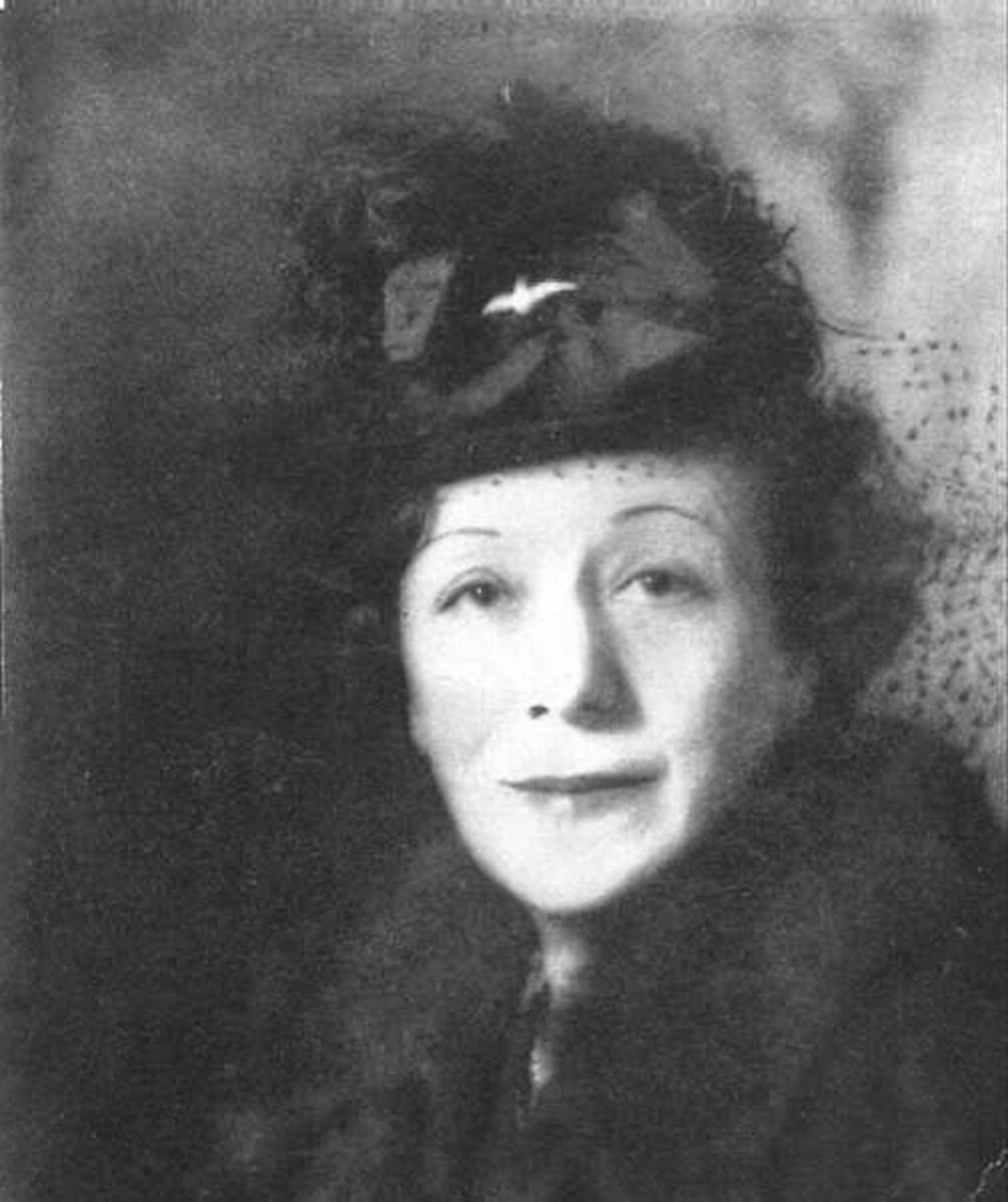
- Weizmann between 1929–1930

First Lady of Israel
- In role 17 February 1949 – 9 November 1952
- President: Chaim Weizmann
- Succeeded by: Rachel Yanait Ben-Zvi

Personal details
- Born: 27 November 1881 Rostov-on-Don, Yekaterinoslav Governorate, Russian Empire
- Died: 24 September 1966 (aged 84) London, UK
- Spouse: Chaim Weizmann (m. 1906; died 1952)
- Children: 2
- Education: University of Geneva
- Occupation: Physician

Vera Weizmann (née Chatzman; Hebrew: ורה ויצמן; Russian: Вера Вейцман; 27 November 1881 – 24 September 1966) was a Russian-born physician, Zionist and inaugural First Lady of Israel from 1949 to 1952. Weizmann was a founding member of the Women's International Zionist Organization.

== Early life and education ==
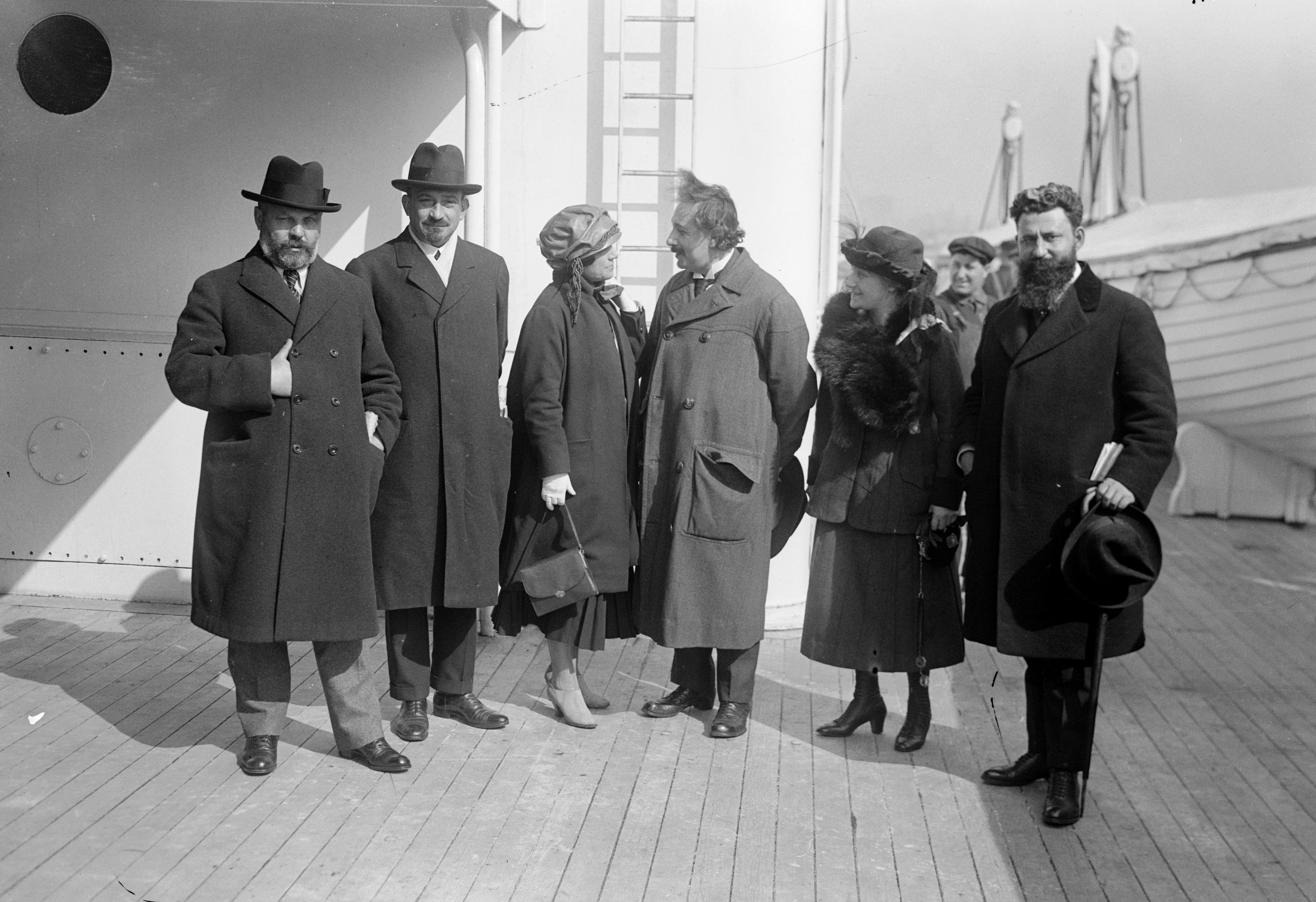
Albert Einstein and his wife Elsa Einstein (centre) with Zionist leaders, including Chaim Weizmann and Vera Weizmann, Menahem Ussishkin, and Ben-Zion Mossinson, on arrival in New York City in 1921

Weizmann was born on 27 November 1881 in Rostov-on-Don, Yekaterinoslav Governorate (present-day, Russia) to Isaiah Chatzman, a wholesale clothing merchant, and Feodosia Chatzman. One of seven siblings, Weizmann grew up in a wealthy Russian–Jewish family. Unlike her brothers, Weizmann did not receive a Jewish education or learn Hebrew.

In 1899, Weizmann began studying medicine at the University of Geneva. The following year Weizmann met her future husband Chaim Weizmann at the University's Zionist Club.

== Career ==
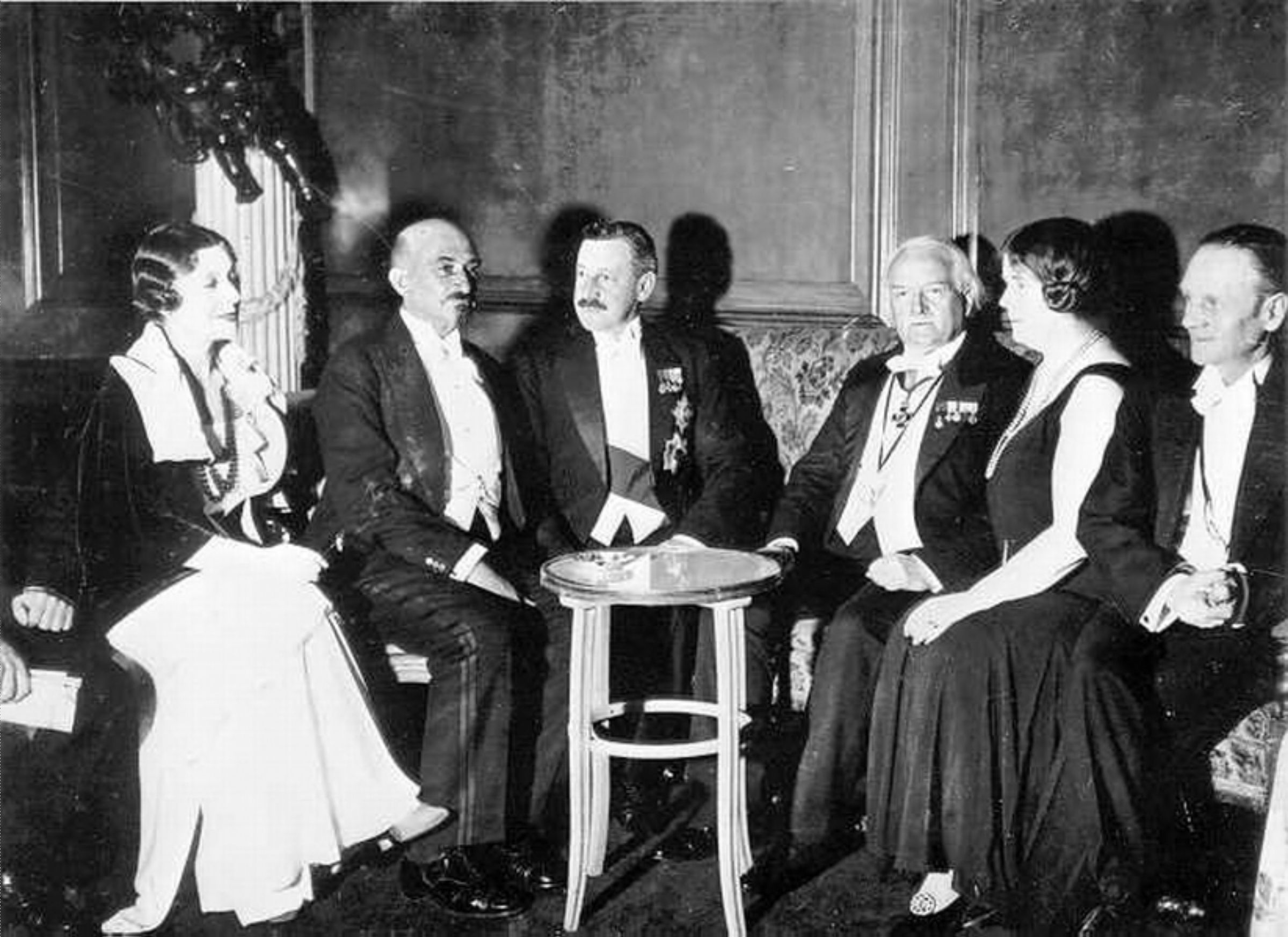
Vera and Chaim Weizmann, Herbert Samuel, David Lloyd George, Ethel Snowden, and Philip Snowden

In 1907, Weizmann and Chaim settled in Manchester. Receiving her English medical license in 1913, Weizmann began and worked as a doctor in the public health service at clinics for infants, developing advanced techniques for infant supervision and nutrition. In 1916, Weizmann gave up her work as a pediatrician when she joined her husband upon his appointment as the scientific adviser in chemistry to the British Admiralty during the First World War.

In 1920, she was one of the founding members of the Women's International Zionist Organization (WIZO), and served as its president, alternating with Lady Sieff, for forty years. When the Second World War broke out in 1939, she devoted all of her efforts to Youth Aliyah (Aliyat Hanoar), an organization that she established in England and continued to head as honorary president while living in Israel.

During the 1948 Arab-Israeli War, Weizmann focused on the treatment and rehabilitation of wounded soldiers. Immediately after the war, she established the Association of the War of Independence Handicapped Veterans and served as its president. She also established two centers for the rehabilitation of wounded soldiers, Beit Kay in Nahariya and the Department of Rehabilitation at Sheba—Tel Hashomer Hospital.

In addition to her activity in these organizations, Weizmann gave her support to many voluntary organizations such as ILAN, Magen David Adom, for which she served as president, and dozens of other private and institutional charitable endeavors.

=== Weizmann House ===
As First Lady, Weizmann had the interior of the house built for the couple at Weizmann Institute redesigned. All of the furniture and art was original, mostly imported from England and France.

== Personal life ==
In 1906, Weizmann married Chaim Weizmann in Zoppot, West Prussia (present-day Sopot, Poland). The couple had two sons, Benjamin Weizmann (1907–1980), a dairy farmer, and Michael Weizmann (1917–1942), a pilot in British Royal Air Force who died whilst serving in the Second World War.

In 1910, Weizmann obtained British citizenship.

On 24 September 1966, Weizmann died in London aged 84.

== Published work ==
- The Impossible Takes Longer: The Memoirs of Vera Weizmann
