= Ofira Navon =

1978–1983 First Lady of Israel (1936–1993)

Ofira Navon אופירה נבון
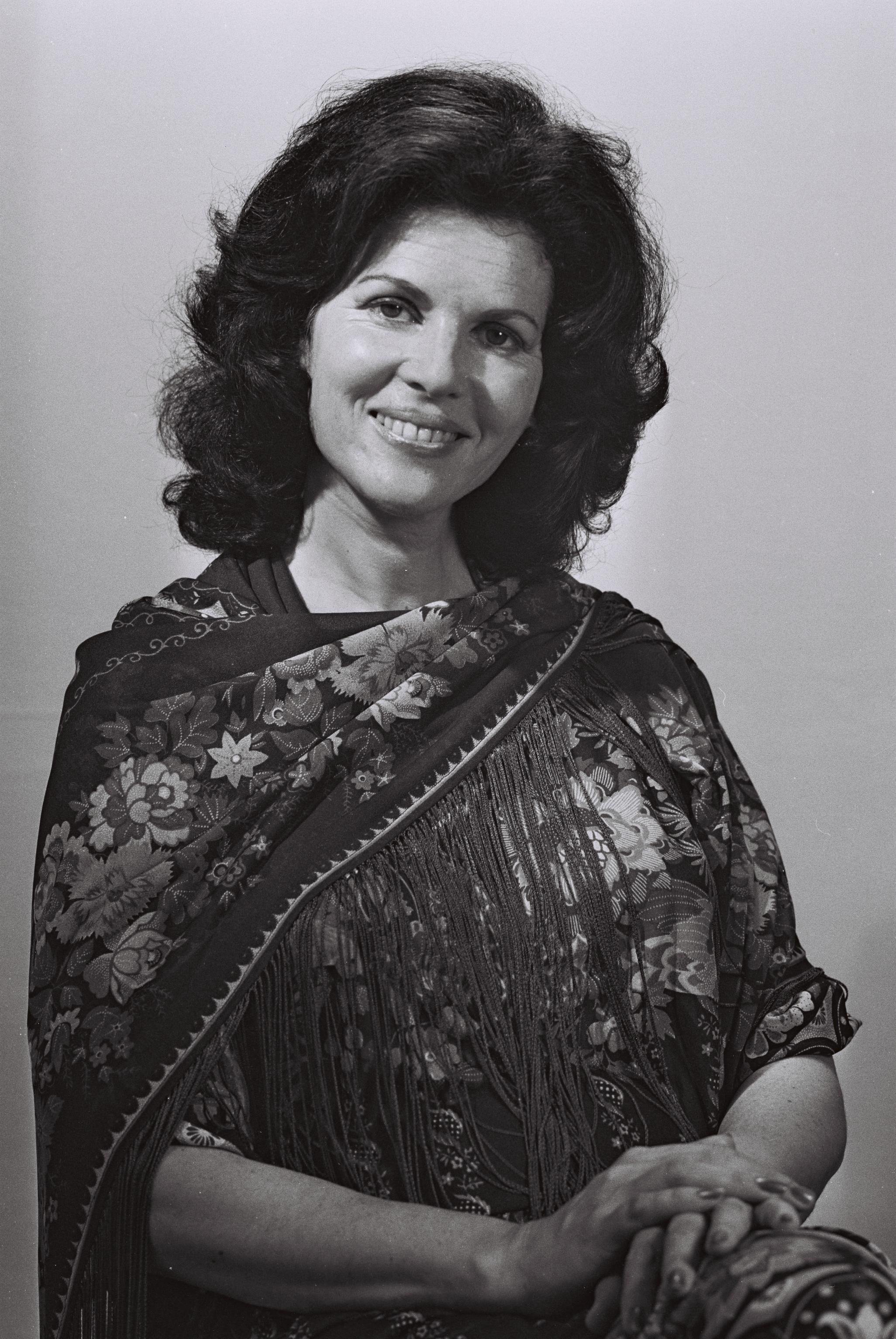

First Lady of Israel
- In office 29 May 1978 – 5 May 1983
- President: Yitzhak Navon
- Preceded by: Nina Katzir
- Succeeded by: Aura Herzog

Personal details
- Born: 1 January 1936 Tel Aviv, Mandatory Palestine
- Died: 22 August 1993 (aged 57) Jerusalem

Ofira Resnikov Navon (Hebrew: אופירה נבון; January 1, 1936 – August 22, 1993) was the wife of Yitzhak Navon, the fifth President of Israel.

== Biography ==
Ofira Navon was born in Tel Aviv to Batya (née Spitkovski) and Eliezer Reznikov-Erez, both originally from Russia. Her father died when she was 8. She earned an MA in education and psychology from the University of Georgia, where she was also a member of the Delta Phi Epsilon sorority, and had professional certification in rehabilitation psychology from Columbia University. She and Yitzhak Navon had two children, Naama and Erez.

== As First Lady ==
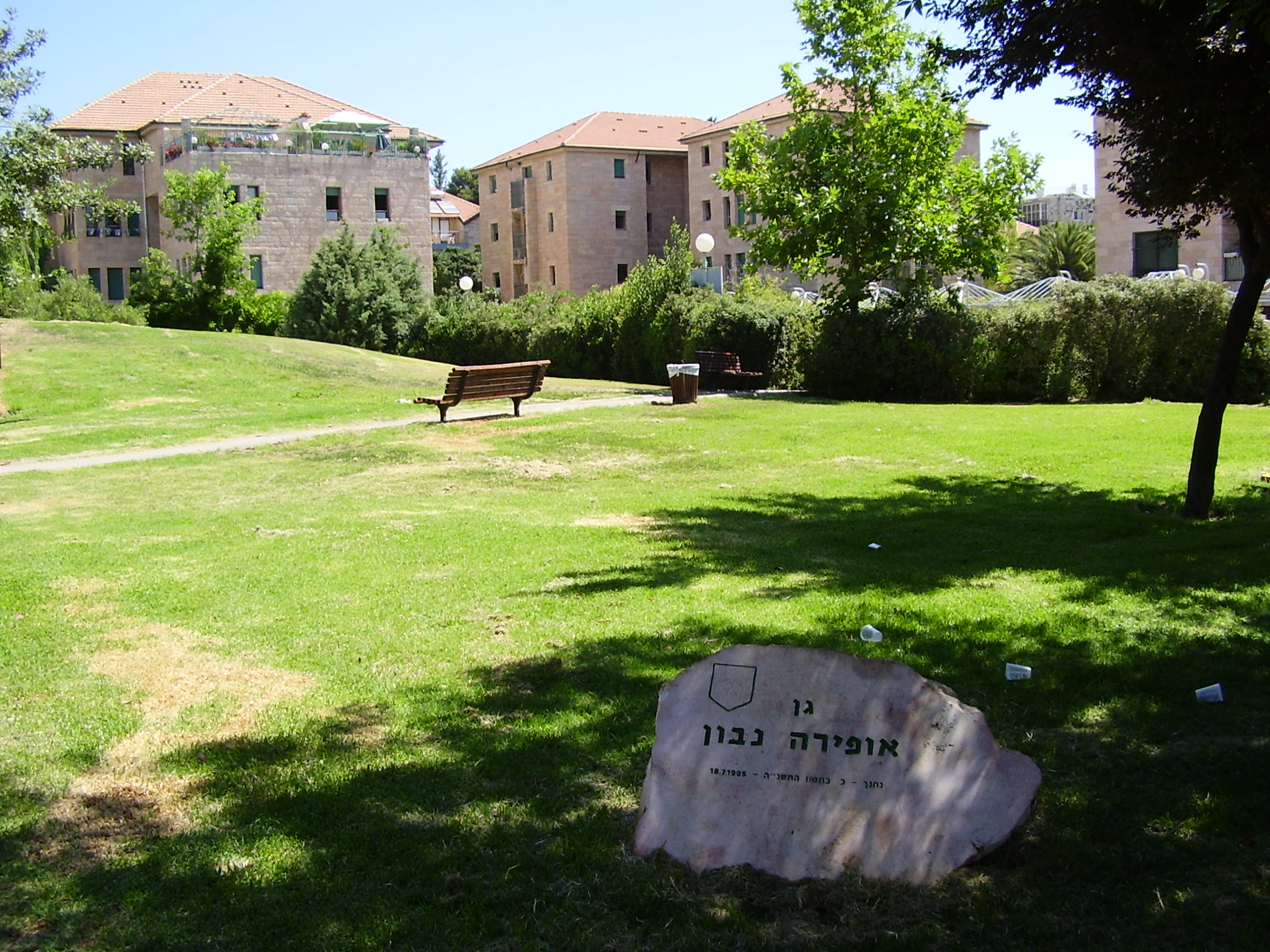
Ofira Navon park, Jerusalem

During her husband's presidency, from 1978 to 1983, Navon raised the profile of the president's wife. As First Lady, Navon established the President's Council for the Welfare of the Child. She worked with Jehan Sadat, wife of the Egyptian president, on rehabilitation projects for soldiers wounded in the Arab-Israeli conflict. Navon also pushed for an international treaty to protect children caught in war zones.

Navon was the first Israeli-born presidential wife. With her Ashkenazi upbringing, her marriage to a Sephardi Jew was unusual at the time. The fact that they were parents of small children was another first for the presidency in Israel.

== Illness and death ==
In 1979, Navon was diagnosed with breast cancer and rejected a mastectomy, opting for chemotherapy and a lumpectomy. Later she argued for the right of patients to determine their own treatment. In August 1993, Navon died of leukemia at Hadassah Medical Center in Jerusalem at the age of 57.

Honorary titles
| Preceded by Nina Katzir | First Lady of Israel; 1978–1983 | Succeeded by Aura Herzog |
