= Nina Katzir =

- נינה קציר
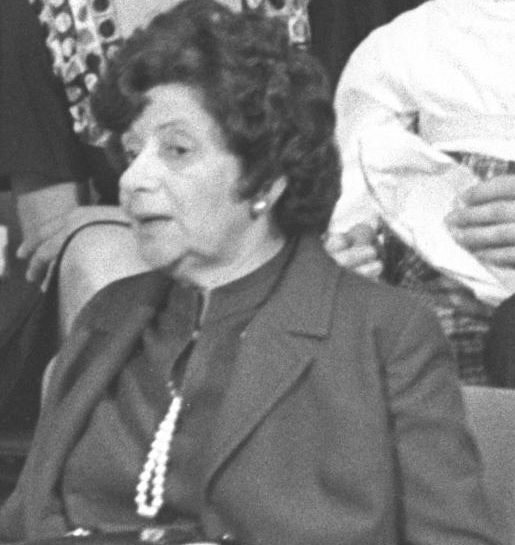
- Nina Katzir at her husband's presidential inauguration, 1973

First Lady of Israel
- In role 24 May 1973 – 29 May 1978
- President: Ephraim Katzir
- Preceded by: Rachel Katznelson-Shazar
- Succeeded by: Ofira Navon

Personal details
- Born: 4 October 1914 Mahilow, Russian Empire
- Died: 12 March 1986 (aged 71) Rehovot, Israel
- Spouse: Ephraim Katzir (m. 1938)
- Children: 3
- Education: Beit Hakerem seminary
- Occupation: English teacher

Nina Katzir (Hebrew: נינה קציר; née Gottlieb; October 4, 1914 – March 12, 1986) was the wife of the President of the State of Israel Ephraim Katzir, and an English teacher at Tichon meuhad high school in Rehovot.

== Biography ==
Born in Mogilev to the Gottlieb family, she immigrated to Mandatory Palestine alone at the age of 16 and settled at her grandfather's house in Rehovot. After graduating from the Beit Hakerem seminary in Jerusalem, she worked as a teacher. She taught Hebrew in Ulpan for new immigrants and taught English in schools. As an English language teacher, she became famous for the modern teaching methods she developed.

She had a column in the Jerusalem Post devoted to foreign language teaching problems. In 1973 she wrote the tourist information book "Hebrew with a smile" which was published by the Ministry of Tourism.

As the wife of the president, she initiated meetings between children's writers and children. On her own initiative, International Children's Week was celebrated in Israel, as part of its activities, wife of diplomats talk about Israel to children in their country of origin.

After the Yom Kippur War, she created a minor scandal, when she initiated the distribution of thousands of "Playboy" booklets to the soldiers at the front due to a request from soldiers.

The Katzir couple had three children: one son, Meir Kaczelski, who serves as a professor of mathematics at the Technion, and two daughters who died at a young age: daughter Nurit died in a gas inhalation accident and daughter Irit who committed suicide.

She acted as part of the "Nurit Foundation" in memory of her daughter, and organized activities for the teenagers. In 1978, the Nurit Katzir Municipal Theater Center in Jerusalem was established in her memory. Other institutions were inaugurated in her daughter name, including the MDA Youth Club and the Nursing School at Assaf Harofeh Hospital.

Honorary titles
Preceded by Rachel Katznelson-Shazar	First Lady of Israel; 1973–1978	Succeeded by Ofira Navon
