= Herut, Israel =

Moshav in central Israel

Herut: חֵרוּת (Hebrew)
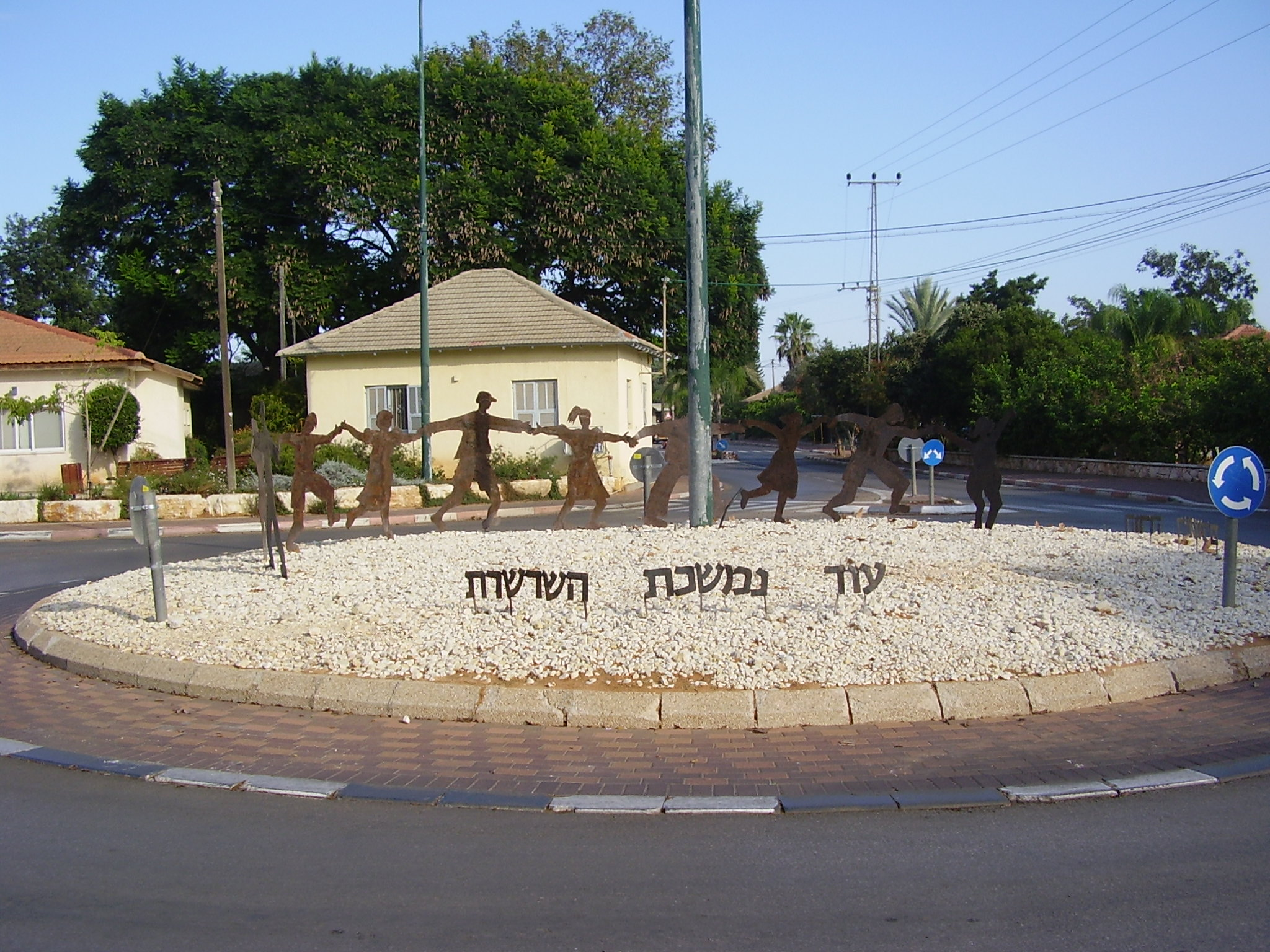
- Roundabout in Herut

- Location within Central Israel Location within Israel
- Coordinates: 32°14′21″N 34°55′0″E
- Country: Israel
- District: Central
- Subdistrict: HaSharon
- Council: Lev HaSharon
- Affiliation: Moshavim Movement
- Founded: 1930
- Population (2024): 1,320
- Website: moshav-herut.org.il

Herut (Hebrew: חֵרוּת, lit. 'Freedom') is a moshav in central Israel. Located in the Sharon plain near Tel Mond, it falls under the jurisdiction of Lev HaSharon Regional Council. In 2024 it had a population of 1,320.

== History ==
The village was founded in 1930 by the Herut society, an organization of immigrants who settled in Mandatory Palestine during the Third and Fourth Aliyah. One of the early agricultural crops was peanuts. Landmarks buildings include a culture hall, Beit Ha'am, built in 1959. Among the founders of the moshav were the parents of Nechama Rivlin, who had immigrated from Ukraine.

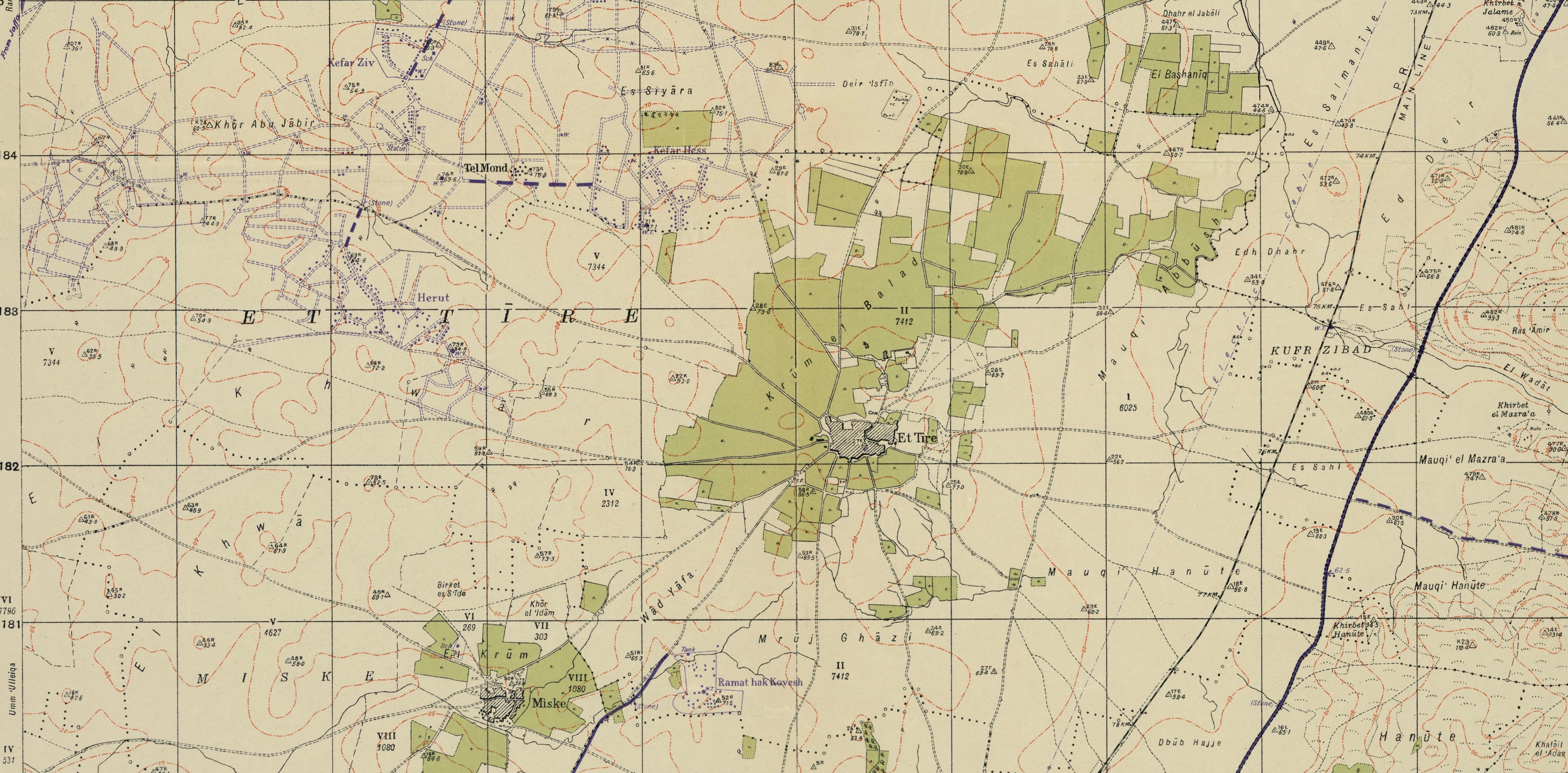
Herut in 1942 (1:20,000)

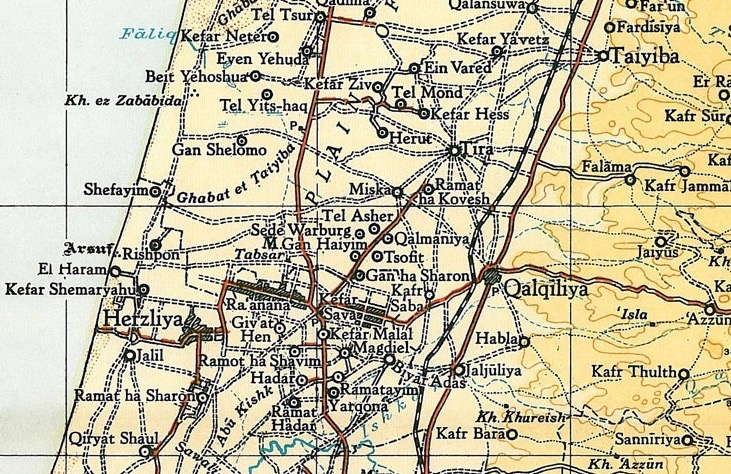
Herut in 1945 (1:250,000)

== Notable residents ==
- Nechama Rivlin
