= Samuel S. Bloom =

Jewish Zionist leader and industrialist (1860–1941)

- שמואל (סם) שמעון בלום
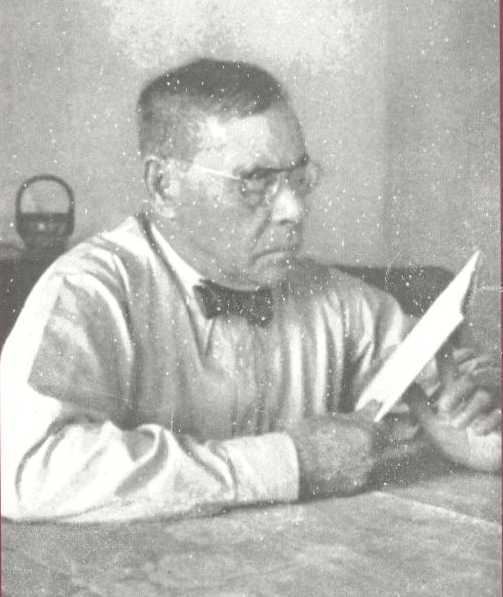
- Samuel S. Bloom
- Born: 25 December 1860; Vilkomir, Russian Empire (now Ukmergė, Lithuania)
- Died: 10 September 1941 (aged 80); Tel Aviv, Mandatory Palestine
- Burial place: Trumpeldor Cemetery, Tel Aviv
- Occupations: Industrialist, Zionist leader
- Known for: Innovation in the field of dentures, Zionist activism
- Relatives: Danny Maseng (great-grandson); Amichai Chasson (great-grandson)

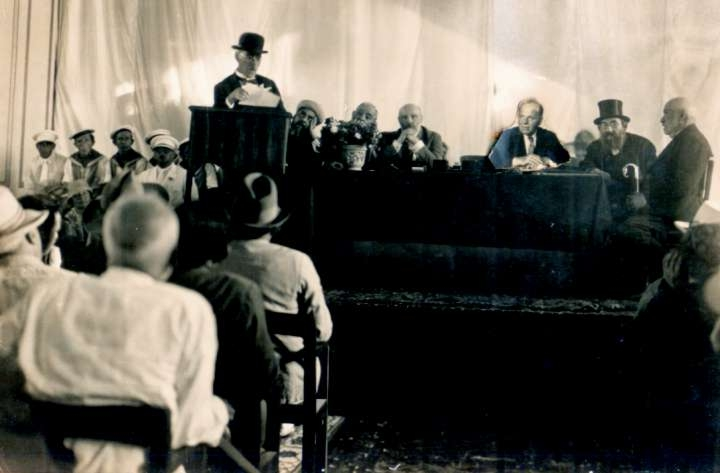
Samuel S. Bloom dedicating the Ohel Shem cultural hall in Tel Aviv, 1928, which he had constructed in honor of Hayim Nahman Bialik, seated third from the right.

Samuel S. Bloom (Hebrew: שמואל (סם) שמעון בלום) (December 25, 1860 - October 10, 1941) was a U.S. Jewish Zionist leader and industrialist and innovator in the field of dentures.

== Biography ==
Bloom was born in Vilkomir, Russian Empire (nowadays Ukmergė, Lithuania), into a religious Jewish family. In 1882, he immigrated to United States of America. He established a plant manufacturing dentures in Philadelphia and was a member of the American Jewish Committee and the American Jewish Congress and attended the World Zionist Congress.

In 1926, he immigrated to Palestine. In 1929, Bloom financed Ohel Shem in Tel Aviv, designed by architect Moshe Czerner, as a permanent home for the Oneg Shabbat society, in the cultural center of Tel Aviv, for the benefit of his friend, the poet Hayim Nahman Bialik, particularly for the dissemination of knowledge of Judaism in all its branches.

Bloom died on September 10, 1941, and was buried in the Trumpeldor Cemetery in Tel Aviv.

The singer Danny Maseng the poet Amichai Chasson, and Josh Kaplan are his great-grandsons.
