= Rita Kogan =

Hebrew author and translator

- ריטה קוגן
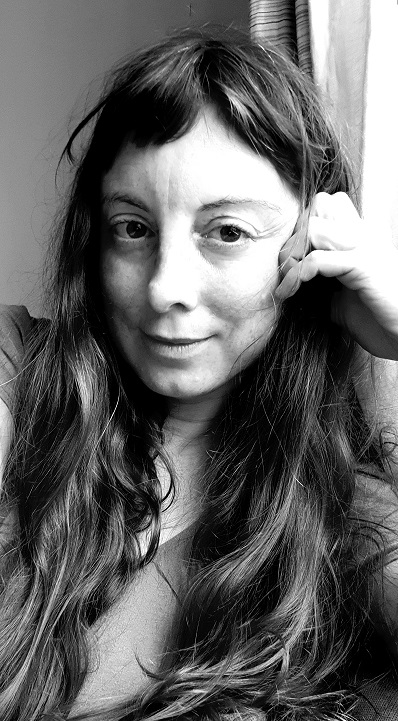
- Born: c. 1976 (age 49–50); Leningrad, Russian SSR, Soviet Union
- Occupations: Poet, Engineer
- Writing career
- Language: Hebrew
- Genre: Feminist poetry Israeli (by emigration)

Rita Kogan (Hebrew: ריטה קוגן, Russian: Рита Коган) is a Hebrew author, poet, essayist and translator based in Tel Aviv. Born in Leningrad, she immigrated to Israel as a part of the 1990s post-Soviet aliyah, when she was 14 years old. After being trained as an engineer, Kogan eventually turned to poetry.

Kogan's poetry explores the challenges that Russian-speaking women encounter in their daily life in Israel, including ethnic discrimination, sexual abuse, and the difficulty of expressing sexuality in a patriarchal society. In addition to the underside of Russian immigrant life, Kogan's verse also reveals the joie-de-vivre of a free Israeli literary spirit, seeking nothing but her loves and literary attachments.

== Early and personal life ==
Rita Kogan was born to an Ashkenazi Jewish family in Saint Petersburg, then known as Leningrad. In 1990, 14-year-old Kogan immigrated to Israel alongside her mother. When she arrived in Israel, she did not speak much Hebrew, and was bullied by other Israeli children and continued to face what she called "sexist stereotypes" throughout her life.

She has a degree in computer science, and is a practicing computer engineer.

Kogan currently lives in Tel Aviv with her pet cats, Bagira, Tulski, Mikey, and George, and her partner, Alfred Cohen, who is also a poet. They chose not to have children, and some of Kogan's poems, including "Tinokot (תינוקות)" from her first book, discusses this topic. In addition to her native Russian and Hebrew, she is also fluent in English. In the 2020 Israeli legislative election, she supported the Joint List. She is an outspoken advocate of Palestinian rights and a critic of Israeli Prime Minister Benjamin Netanyahu.

She identifies as Jewish, and as a feminist.

In 2018, she received an honorable mention in The First Lady of the State of Israel Prize for Hebrew Poetry. In 2025, she was awarded the UZG Prize for her contribution to Hebrew literature.

== Themes ==
"You're leftist? Weird. You're Russian! — Do you have a boyfriend? No? Weird. You're Russian! — You won't fuck me? No? But you're Russian. — You fucked him? Already? Sure, you're Russian." -Rita Kogan, "Self-Definition."

Kogan's work draws substantially from her own experience as an immigrant, as well as her experience as a woman in Israel. Her poetry often touches on the plight that many immigrants face as they attempt to integrate into Israeli society, and explores the intersectionality of racism and sexism in contemporary Israeli society. She cites Anna Akhmatova as a major influence on her writing.

For instance, one of her early poems, "Self-Definition" (Hebrew: הגדרה-עצמית, romanized: Hagdara-atzmit) deals with the widely-held stereotypes often levied at Russian women by overwhelmingly patriarchal Israeli institutions, such as the stereotypes that Russian women are sexually promiscuous or support Likud policies. Another of her poems, titled "Fir Trees Aren't," deals with the common Jewish stereotype that Russian Jews are gentiles, using the symbolism of Christmas trees that many Israelis associated with Russian immigrants.

Reception to Kogan's work has been mostly positive, with Poetry International hailing Kogan as a "literary phenomenon" whose work deftly explores the intersection of race and gender in a multicultural nation like Israel.

Kogan predominately writes poetry in Hebrew, as opposed to her native Russian, explaining that it is better for her as an immigrant to write in the most widely disseminated language of her adoptive country than to write in her native language to a comparatively smaller audience. She feels that in order for her message to reach the widest audience possible, she should write in the nation's lingua franca.

== Works ==
=== Poetry Compilations ===
- A License to Misspell (רישיון לשגיאות כתיב)
- A Horse in a Skirt (סוס בחצאית)
- Mal de Terre (מחלת יבשה)

=== Prose ===
- Stoneland (ארץ־סלע) - selection of 11 short stories and novellas

=== Translations ===
- Tale of the Dead Princess and the Seven Knights by Alexander Pushkin
- The Scarlet Flower by Sergey Aksakov
- The Town in the Snuff-box by Vladimir Odoyevsky
- The Black Hen or The Underground Inhabitants by Antony Pogorelsky

== See also ==
- Zoya Cherkassky-Nnadi
- List of Russian Jews
