= Avoth Yeshurun =

Israeli poet

- אבות ישורון
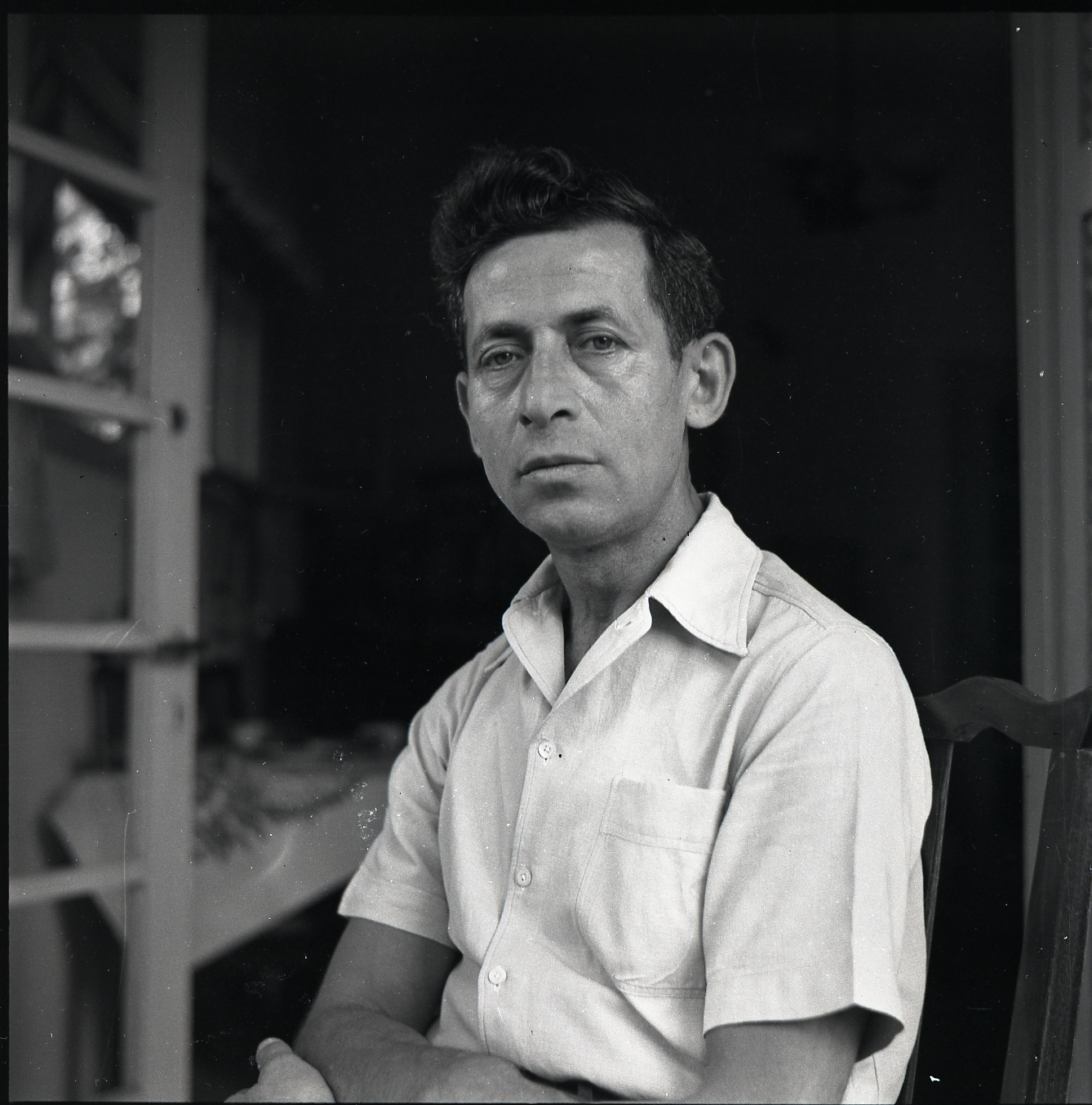
- Avoth Yeshurun in 1952
- Born: Yehiel Perlmutter; 6 October 1904; Nesukhoyezhe, Volhynia Governorate, Russian Empire
- Died: 22 December 1992 (aged 88); Tel Aviv, Israel
- Occupation: Poet
- Notable work: Al khokhmot drakhim; Re'em; Ze Shem HaSefer; Homograph
- Awards: Brenner Prize (1967); Bialik Prize (1979); Israel Prize (1992)

Avoth Yeshurun (Hebrew: אבות ישורון; 1904–1992, born Yehiel Perlmutter), also Avot Yeshurun, was an acclaimed modern Hebrew poet. He was the winner of the Israel Prize for literature in 1992.

== Biography ==
Avoth Yeshurun was born on Yom Kippur in 1904 in the small town of Nesukhoyezhe in the Volhynia region of what is now in Ukraine, then the Russian Empire. His father, Baruch, came from a family of flour mill owners. His mother, Ryckelle (Rachel) was of rabbinic descent. Yeshurun grew up speaking Yiddish. When he was five, his parents moved to Krasnystaw in East Poland. He left for the British Mandate of Palestine in 1925, against the will of his parents who preferred that he remain in Poland. Initially he worked in construction, dredged swamps and picked fruit; later he worked in a brick factory and for a printer. In 1929, he joined the Haganah, the Jewish militia that later became the Israeli Defense Force. In 1934 he married Pesyah Justman. Their daughter Helit was born in 1942. Yeshurun's family, along with Krasnystaw's 2,000 Jews, were murdered in Belzec extermination camp in today's Poland.

== Yeshurun's Poetry ==
His first book, Al khokhmot drakhim ("On the wisdom of roads"), was published under his birthname, Yehiel Perlmutter. He changed his name to Avoth Yeshurun in 1948, the night before he was inducted into the Israel Defense Forces. In 1952 Yeshurun published a highly controversial poem, "Pesach al Kochim", in which he compared the tragedy of the Palestinian refugees with that of the Jewish Holocaust.

His subsequent books were Re'em (a combination of the Hebrew words for "Thunder" and "Antelope"), 1961, Shloshim Amud ("Thirty Pages"), 1965, Ze Shem HaSefer ("This is the Name of the Book"), 1971, HaShever HaSuri-Afrika'i ("The Syrian-African Rift"), 1974, Kapella Kolot ("A Capella of Voices"), 1977, Sha'ar Knisa Sha'ar Yetzia ("Entrance Gate Exit Gate"), 1981, Homograph, 1985, Adon Menucha ("Mr. Rest"), 1990, and Ein Li Achshav ("I Have No Now"), 1992.

Many of Yeshurun's poems allude to the guilt he felt for having left Europe before the Holocaust, leaving his home and family behind. His poetry is known for its broken phrasing, and combines Yiddish, biblical and modern Hebrew, and slang used by various cultural groups in Israel, including phrases in Arabic, which he often uses ironically in criticism of the marginalization of Arabs and Arabic in Israeli culture.

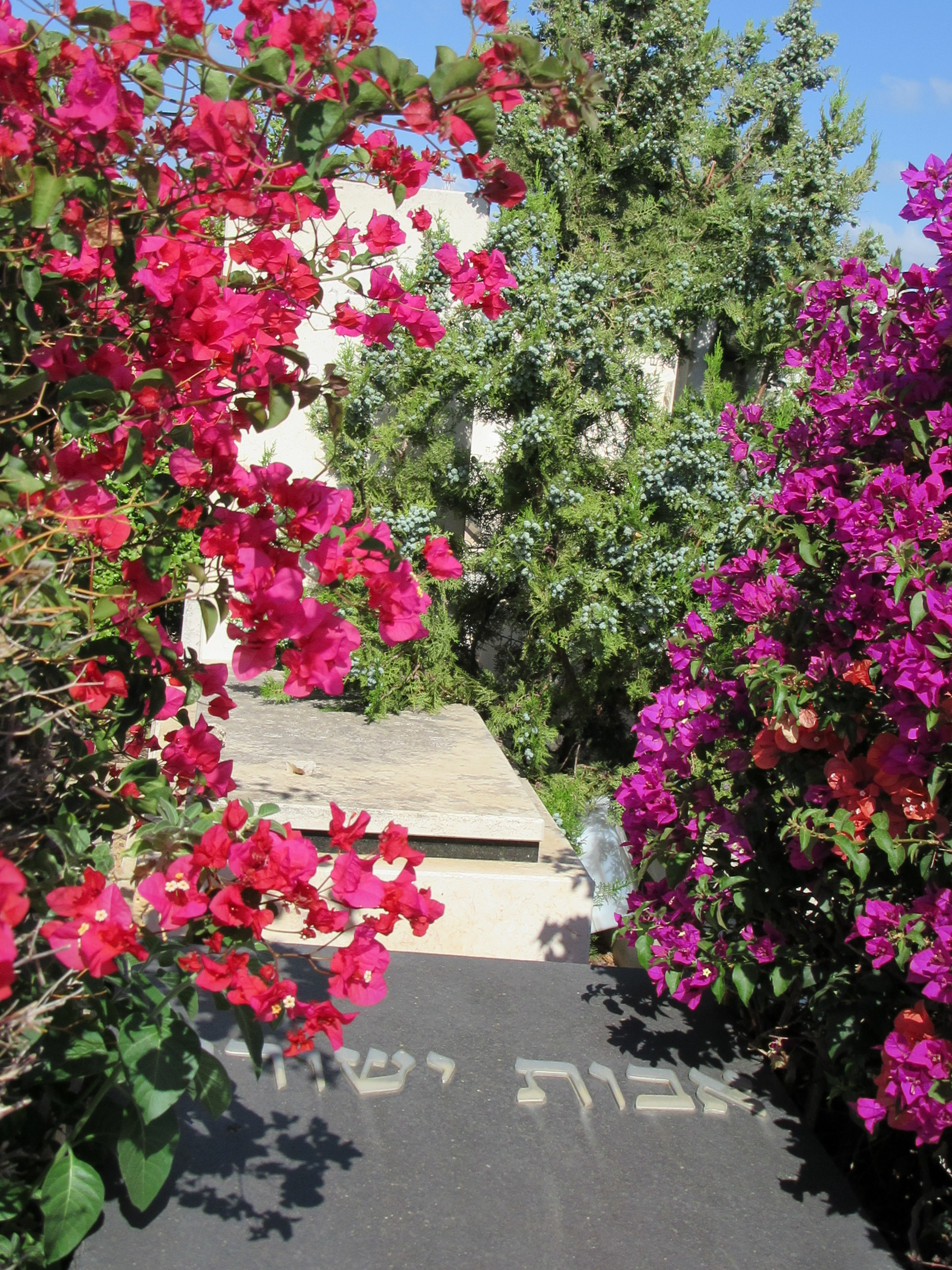
The grave of Avoth Yeshurun

== Death ==
Avoth Yeshurun died in 1992.

In 2018, a documentary about Yeshurun called Yeshurun in 6 Chapters by Amichai Chasson premiered in Docaviv International Documentary Film Festival.

== Awards ==
- In 1967, Yeshurun was awarded the Brenner Prize.
- In 1979, he was the co-recipient (jointly with Aharon Appelfeld) of the Bialik Prize for literature.
- In 1992, he was awarded the Israel Prize, for Hebrew poetry.

== See also ==
- List of Israel Prize recipients
- List of Bialik Prize recipients
