= Nechama Rivlin =

First Lady of Israel, 2014 - 2019

- נחמה ריבלין
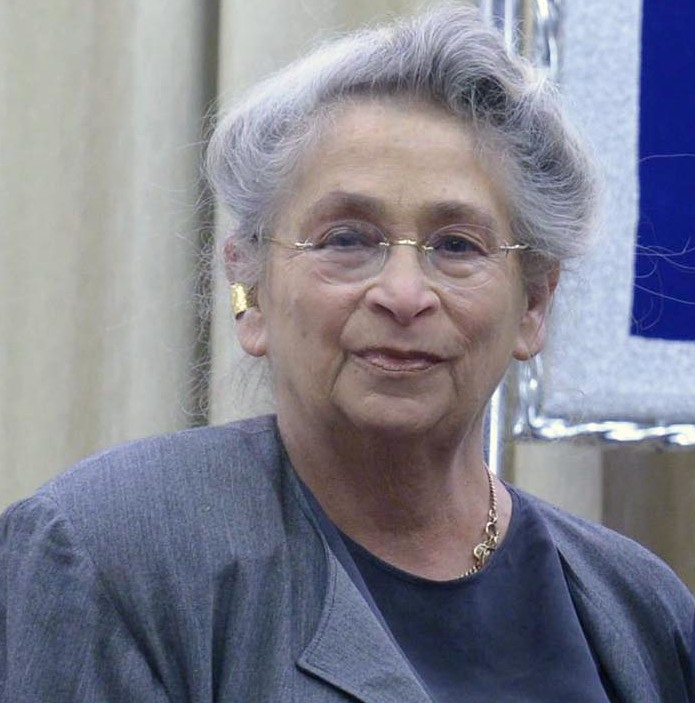

First Lady of Israel
- In role 24 July 2014 – 4 June 2019
- President: Reuven Rivlin
- Preceded by: Sonia Peres (2011)
- Succeeded by: Michal Herzog (2021)

Personal details
- Born: Nechama Shulman; 5 June 1945 Herut, Mandatory Palestine
- Died: 4 June 2019 (aged 73) Petah Tikva, Israel
- Spouse: Reuven Rivlin (m. 1971–2019)
- Children: 3
- Education: Hebrew University of Jerusalem (B.Sc.)

Nechama Rivlin (Hebrew: נחמה ריבלין, née Shulman; 5 June 1945 – 4 June 2019) was an Israeli researcher, science secretary, and First Lady of Israel from 2014 to 2019. She worked at the Hebrew University of Jerusalem from 1967 to 2007.

== Early life and education ==
Rivlin was born on a moshav in Herut, Israel. Her parents, Mendi and Drora Kayla Shulman, who immigrated from Ukraine, helped establish the community. Her mother, who had immigrated from Ukraine, was widowed when her husband died at the age of 45 from an illness. Rivlin was five at the time. Her mother then worked the farm, "with its orchard, cattle and chickens." "I remember her working hard and fighting like a lioness for the right to work the land, despite the objective difficulties entailed in choosing such a demanding way of life. She never sank into debt – no small feat in a cooperative farming settlement," Rivlin later wrote.

Rivlin attended local schools and graduated from the Ruppin Regional High School. In 1964 she enrolled at the Hebrew University of Jerusalem where she earned a BSc in Botany and Zoology, along with a Teaching Diploma.

== Career ==
Rivlin became a researcher at Hebrew University in 1967. Her initial role was in the Department of Zoology and she later worked in the genetics division in the Department of Ecology. She later worked as a scientific secretary at the university's Institute of Life Sciences. Rivlin retired in 2007.

== Political links ==
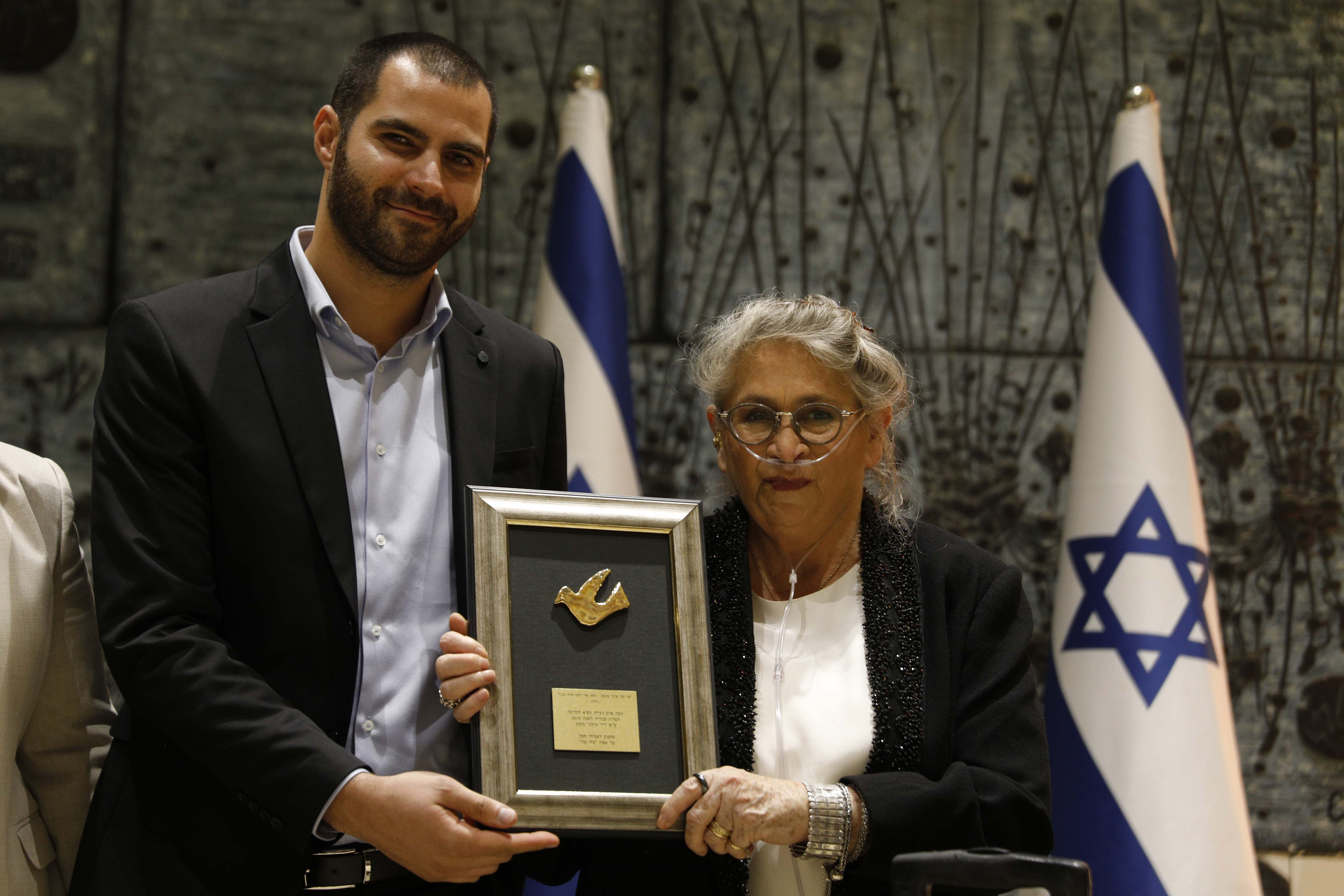
Nechama Rivlin presents The First Lady of the State of Israel Prize for Hebrew Poetry for the year 2018, to the poet Amichai Chasson for his book «Bli Ma».

In her position as the wife of the Israeli President, Rivlin concentrated on areas she was most familiar with through her academic work and family. One area of focus was nature and the environment.

Rivlin was also a vocal supporter of women and children. Inaugurating her first major initiative as First Lady, she welcomed 200 Akim activists to the President's residence to draw attention to the needs of intellectually challenged children and to advocate for supporting them. Sharing a message of peace and tolerance, she hosted students and teachers from the Hand in Hand: Center for Jewish-Arab Education in Israel at the President's Residence following an arson attack at their school. Rivlin said violence against children was a great problem throughout society, and that Israel should work to investigate and address child abuse. "We must break this conspiracy of silence once and for all", she said. In March 2016, she hosted a group of women who had publicly shared their experiences with sexual assault and domestic abuse. Rivlin told them that by telling their stories, they would help others who face difficult issues.

Rivlin joined her husband on international trips. Together, they visited U.S. President Barack Obama and First Lady Michelle Obama at the White House for the December 2015 Hanukkah celebration. Nechama and Reuven lit a menorah made in Israel by designer Ze'ev Raban.

In 2018, Rivlin established the Dr. Gardner Simon Prize for Hebrew Poetry Rivlin presented the prize to Poet Amichai Chasson for the first time.

== Personal life and death ==
In 1970, Rivlin met Reuven Rivlin at a party. They married in 1971, a year after their meeting. It was his second marriage and he had a son from his first marriage. It was her first marriage. The couple had three children, Rivka, Anat, and Ran. The family resided in Yefeh Nof. After her retirement in 2007, she became a film buff, watched theatre, and developed an interest in gardening and the environment. Later in life, she studied the history of art.

Rivlin suffered from pulmonary fibrosis, an interstitial lung disease. She was regularly seen in public with a portable oxygen tank. On 11 March 2019, Rivlin received a lung transplant from 19 year old Yair Yehezkel Chalabli's body, who died in a freediving accident. She died on 4 June, one day shy of her 74th birthday, at Beilinson Hospital in Petah Tikva of complications following the transplant. She is survived by her husband and a sister, Vered.

Nechama Rivlin was laid in state at Jerusalem Theatre on Wednesday, June 5, 2019. Speakers at her funeral included Rabbi Binyamin Lau and author Haim Be'er, as well as her husband, President Rivlin and children. Singers Rona Kenan and Alon Eder also performed at the funeral. Rivlin was buried at the Mount Herzl national cemetery in Jerusalem later that day.

Honorary titles
Vacant Title last held by Sonia Peres	First Lady of Israel; 2014–2019	Vacant Title next held by Michal Herzog
