= Encyclopaedia Biblica (Israel) =

Encyclopaedia Biblica (Hebrew: אנציקלופדיה מקראית) is a scientific encyclopedia of the Hebrew Bible, published in Israel by Bialik Institute in the Hebrew language. The work is scientific, rather than religious, but because of its Jewish background, it only deals with the Hebrew Bible and some apocrypha, but not with the New Testament, which is considered a part of the Bible in Christianity.

The work on the encyclopedia started in 1942, before the establishment of the state of Israel. Biblical encyclopedias in several languages existed then, but there was no such in work in Hebrew, which by that time was already the living spoken and literary language of the Jewish community in Palestine. The initiative was started by the archaeologist Eleazar Sukenik, who proposed the idea to the Bialik Institute. The Institute supported it and created a commission of scholars to determine the format of the future work. Among those scholars were Naftali Herz Tur-Sinai, Leo Aryeh Mayer, Moshe Zvi Segal, Moshe David Cassuto, Shmuel Yeivin, Fishel Lakhover, Benjamin Mazar (Maisler) and Menachem Solieli.

Initially, the work was supposed to include 6,700 articles in five volumes. According to the plan, the work on it was supposed to be completed in five years. The first example pages were published in 1947. The 1947–48 Civil War in Mandatory Palestine and the battles for Jerusalem disrupted the work on the encyclopedia. Eventually, the first volume was published in 1950, the scope of the work grew to eight volumes, and the final volume was only published in 1982.

== Bibliography ==
- Encyclopaedia Biblica, Bialik Institute, 1952–1982
