= Ada Aharoni =

Israeli poet and sociologist (born 1933)

- עדה אהרוני
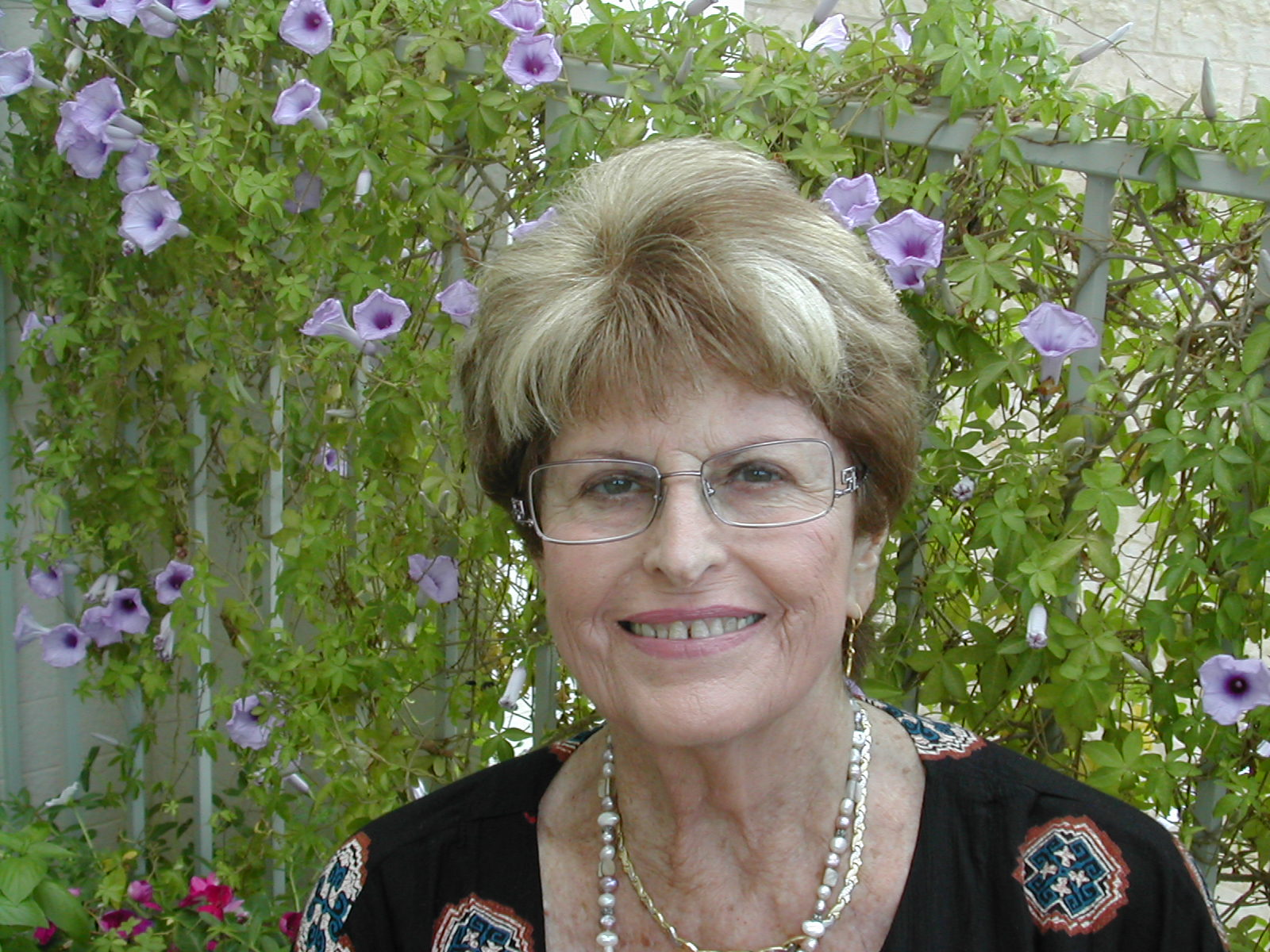
- Born: 30 July 1933 (age 93); Cairo, Egypt
- Occupations: Writer, poet, dramatist, sociologist
- Awards: Haifa Honorary Citizen Award. Israeli President’s Award for peace culture. Laureate Tèmoignage Prize, Paris, 2014. Hebrew Writers Association: Honorary Award for creative works for the promotion of Hebrew Culture, 2017.
- Website: iflac.wordpress.com

Ada Aharoni (Hebrew: עדה אהרוני; born Andrée Yadid, 1933) is an Israeli poet, writer, lecturer, sociologist and peace researcher. She has published numerous books of peace poetry, historical novels, sociology, history, biography, drama, film-scripts, literary criticism, and children's books. In her work she often focuses on the "Second Exodus", the uprooting of the Jews from Egypt, following the establishment of Israel in 1948, which she personally experienced. Aharoni is the founder and world president of The International Forum for the Literature and Culture of Peace (IFLAC).

== Personal life ==
Aharoni was born in Cairo, in a Jewish family of French nationality. She attended the Alvernia English School for Girls, a convent school in the neighbourhood of Zamalek, where she was taught English literature by Irish Franciscan nuns. "At the age of 10 I already decided going to be a writer," she stated during an interview with The Jerusalem Post. In 1949, her father, an export-import merchant of flour, had his work permit revoked, and the Egyptian authorities confiscated the money he had transferred to a Swiss bank. The family moved to France, and Aharoni moved to Israel soon after, at the age of 16. Aharoni was married to Haim Aharoni for 55 years until he died in 2006. He was a professor at the Faculty of Chemical Engineering at Technion. They had two children, Ariel and Talia. Talia died from breast cancer in 2011. Aharoni lives in Haifa, Israel.

== Career ==
Ada Aharoni received her Bachelor of Arts degree in history, sociology and English literature from the University of Haifa, and the Hebrew University of Jerusalem. In 1964, she received her M.Phil. Degree on the literature of Henry Fielding, from the University of London's (Birkbeck College) and was awarded her Ph.D. on Saul Bellow's Introspective Fiction at the Hebrew University in Jerusalem, in 1975.

Aharoni taught literature at the University of Haifa and sociology and conflict resolution at the Technion (Israel Institute of Technology) in Haifa. She worked as a guest lecturer and visiting professor at several universities, including the University of Pennsylvania, where she became professor.

She is the founder and world president of The International Forum for the Literature and Culture of Peace (IFLAC) . Established in 1999, its goal is to build "bridges of understanding and peace through culture, literature and communication." IFLAC Directors and Peace Ambassadors are appointed in some 20 countries. She and Dr. Vijay Kumar Roy have edited 3 anthologies benefiting the organisation, focusing on war, terror, and human trafficking.

Aharoni organised the Second World Congress of the Jews from Egypt (WCJE) in 2006 at Haifa University. Aharoni served as the president of the organisation, assembling 350 researchers and writers. The WCJE held two additional symposiums at Haifa University in 2007 and Bar Ilan University in 2008. Aharoni, Aimee Israel-Pelletier, and Levana Zamir published the proceedings of the congress in History and Culture of the Jews of Egypt in Modern Times (Keness Hafakot, Tel Aviv, 2008), in English, French and Hebrew.

In 2012, she was awarded the President's Award by Shimon Peres, for Volunteerism and peace culture for promoting peace initiatives between Jews and Arabs. In 2015, she was elected Honorary Citizen of Haifa (Yakir Haifa). She was the first woman, invited to speak in the Mahmood Mosque in Kababir, Haifa in 2012.

=== Second Exodus research ===
The term "Second Exodus" coined by Ada Aharoni, refers to the forced migration of the Jews from Arab countries after the State of Israel was founded in 1948. Out of the estimated million Jews that were displaced, the majority found refuge in Israel, while 650,000 Palestinians fled or were ousted from Israel. This displacement of Jews has been overlooked in the various efforts for peace between the Israelis and Palestinians, Aharoni writes in her research paper The Forced Migration of Jews from Arab Countries and Peace, and also in an YnetNews article called What about the Jewish Nakba? She argues that these two tragedies and their commonalities could have a conciliatory effect on both sides which could be beneficial to the promotion of peace.

In their joint article titled Possibilities of Israeli-Palestinian Conflict Resolution Based On Mutual Recognition Of National Aspirations, Aharoni and her husband, Haim Aharoni, write that the settlement of Palestinian refugees in Israel should be very limited, and that refugees, if "returned" to the place that has become part of Israel, would find themselves in a place foreign to them:

Processes that take place in a society are rarely reversible processes; repair of wrongs and compensation on suffering cannot usually be accomplished by a return to the previous situation but by the creation of a new situation that is beneficial while appropriate to the new conditions.

The Golden Age of the Jews from Egypt – Uprooting and Revival in Israel (Orion Publishing, 2013.) contains 73 stories of Jewish refugees from Egypt compiled by Aharoni.

== Poetry ==
Aharoni's poems can be broadly divided into three categories: Peace, Love and Women. Often they overlap, and peace, abolishment of war, equality for women, and the power of women for peace are prominent in her poems. One of her most published peace poems is A Bridge of Peace, a message from an Israeli to a Palestinian woman. Robert Nissenson, and Yigal Alfassi composed music to Ada Aharoni's poems. They are sung by Revital Levanon and Anat Yagen and other singers, on the disc "A Green Week" and other discs, and played on radio and TV (1999–2021). Latest discs by singer and composer Shoshia Beeri Dotan "Peace Flower", and various poems, including "Ä Bridge of Peace" were composed and sung by Shlomo Ron and Rani Hellerman.

=== Peace poetry ===
At 13, just after WW2, Aharoni together with an Arab student co-edited a school magazine, called Rainbow, at Alvernia, with the motto: Abolish wars forever. British Peace Poet Wilfred Owen became an inspiration for her own work as a Peace Poet. He made her see "the absurdity of war."

Aharoni began writing poetry on the theme of war and peace during the 1973 Arab-Israeli War (Yom Kippur War). "In most of Aharoni's first published poems on the theme of war and peace, her Egyptian origins linger discreetly in the background," Joel Beinin writes in The Dispersion of Egyptian Jewry, in which he examines the diversity of Egyptian Jewish identities in Egypt and in the diaspora. "The Egyptian-Israeli negotiations and interim Sinai disengagement agreements following the 1973 war apparently encouraged her to advance beyond general calls for peace to articulate more specifically what peace meant to Aharoni through recollections of her previous life in Egypt."

Some of these early peace poems are concerned with the struggle for the survival of Israel, as seen in To an Egyptian Soldier (written during the Yom Kippur War), where Aharoni tells him that "you will always have your Nile... but if we lose there's only the sea." The source of this "passionate attachment to her new homeland" is her recollection of what it was to be "an 'outsider', unwanted and not belonging" in Egypt, Len Goldzweig (lecturer in the Dept. of English at Haifa University) writes in the Preface of Aharoni's Poems from Israel (1992).

She recalls this sense of alienation in Arab Israeli Student on T.V., where the student ponders on where he belongs: Do I feel like an Israeli Arab? Or like an Arab Israeli? "I remember my own rootless wound in Egypt land – and I hurt your dangling hurt, my Semitic cousin in pain."

=== The power of the poem ===
Aharoni believes that poems are suitable vehicles for building bridges of trust and respect for each other's culture and humanity. As we have become more mobile, the most profound difference between us is our culture, and not the territory. Peace poems have the ability to present the stories of both sides in a conflict, "in all its reality, pain, hope and yearning for peace."

Examples of this two-sided view are found in the poems This Cursed War and Remember Me Every Time the Moon Rises Over the Sphinx, inspired by letters found on fallen Israeli and Egyptian soldiers during the Yom Kippur War.

"The only way to bridge the cultural differences between human beings is through knowledge of each other," Aharoni told Birute Regine during an interview for Regine's book Iron Butterflies: Women Transforming Themselves and the World, in which Aharoni is one of the Iron Butterflies. In her poem A Bridge of Peace, Aharoni extends a bridge to the women of Palestine: "My Arab sister, let us build a sturdy bridge from your olive world to mine, from my orange world to yours... we do not want to make each other afraid under our vines and under our fig trees."

Rare Flower (2012), a moving poetry collection about love and peace spans five decades and is dedicated to the memory of her departed husband, Chaim Aharoni, and her departed daughter, Talia Aharoni Winkler. The book was translated into many languages, and nominated for a Nobel Prize, in 2014.

Several of Aharoni's poems are put to music and released on three CDs: A Green Week, To Haim – To Life (Love Poems) and Rare Flower.

In 2017 Aharoni published Horizon of Hope: (Gvanim Publishers, Tel Aviv, 2017): A Bilingual poetry collection: English-Hebrew, of love, peace, women poems, and poems based on letters of soldiers to their loved ones in Israel, during the wars in Lebanon and Gaza, as well as anti-terror on Daesh (ISIS).

=== Style ===
In the Preface of Poems from Israel, Goldzweig describes the language of Aharoni's poems as unpretentious. "She doesn't hide behind words," and this creates a "ruthless honesty." He also comments on her irregular use of rhyme and stanza form. "This too, is a form of nakedness, because so much bad poetry is hidden behind strong galloping rhythms and chiming rhymes."

Prof. Rebecca Oxford (Alabama A&M University), in her book The Language of Peace – Communicating to Create Harmony, analyses the use of the "image of peace as a cross-cultural bridge" in Aharoni's A Bridge of Peace. In this poem, Oxford writes, the "assonance and imagery" of the words "olive world" and "orange world" bring the two women, one Israeli and one Palestinian, together and show that they have much in common. A "bridge of Jasmine understanding" can banish the fear, allowing each woman to sit with her baby "under her vine and under her fig tree and none shall make them afraid!"

In an interview with the Sketchbook literary journal, Aharoni confirmed that she prefers open form poems as they give room for more depth and intimacy.

== Works ==
=== Editor ===
- Aharoni, Ada, Cronin, Gloria, and Goldman, Liela, ed., Saul Bellow: A Mosaic Peter Lang, N.Y., N.Y., 1992. ISBN 9780820415727.
- Aharoni, Ada, Scheidemann, Mike, ed., A Song to Life and to World Peace, Posner and Sons, Jerusalem, 1993. ISBN 9652190136.
- Aharoni, Ada and Zilbershtein, Judith, ed., Waves of Peace: In the Memory of Yitzhak Rabin, Galim 8, Hatichon: Shfaram, 1997. ISBN 9652227749

=== Non-fiction ===
- Thea: To Alexandria, Jerusalem and Freedom Dorrance & Company, Bryn Mawr, PA, 1984. ISBN 9780805929225
- Théa Wolf. La femme en blanc de l'hôpital d'Alexandrie MANUSCRIT. 2004. ISBN 978-2304043945 (French edition)
- Memoirs from Alexandria: Not in Your War Anymore Hatichon, G. Farah, ShfarAm, 1997. ISBN 9659013922.
- Not in Vain: An Extraordinary Life Ladybug Publishing House, California, 1998. ISBN 9781889409184
- Not in Vain Carmel Publications, Jerusalem, 2014. (Hebrew edition)
- Women Create A World Beyond War and Violence Micha Lachman, Haifa, 2002.
- NASHIM: Yotsrot Olam Lelo Milhamot Ve Alimout Lena, Haifa, 2002. (Hebrew edition) ISBN 978-9657204016
- The Golden Age of the Jews from Egypt – Uprooting and Revival in Israel. Orion publications, Holon, 2016.
- Woman in White, Micha Lachman, Haifa 2005. (Hebrew edition)
- The Woman in White: An Extraordinary Life 2017. ISBN 978-1973930693

=== Novels ===
- From the Nile to the Jordan Tamuz, 1994, M. Lachman, 1997. ISBN 9659013906.
- Du Nil Au Jourdain Stavit, Paris, 2002. (French edition)
- The Second Exodus: A Historical Novel Bryn Mawr, PA, 1983. ISBN 0805928626. Library of Congress Catalog Card No. 8290872.
- Nearing of Hearts: A Historical Novel on the Jews of Egypt Gvanim, 2007, Tel Aviv.

=== Children's books ===
- Peace Flower: A Space Adventure Lachman, Haifa, 1994, 1996. ISBN 9659013914
- Peace Flower: A Space Adventure Ladybug Press, California, 1999. (audiobook version)
- PEACE FLOWER: A Nuclear Space Adventure – for Children and all Ages 2021. ISBN 9798716203389

=== Poetry collections ===
- Whispered Thoughts Haifa Publications, Haifa, Israel, 1970.
- Metal and Violets Eked, Tel Aviv, Israel, 1978.
- Metal et Violettes Characteres, Paris, 1996. (French edition)
- Poems from Israel Outposts, Surrey, England, 1972.
- Poems from Israel and Other Poems Berger Publications, Pittsburgh, 1974.
- From the Pyramids to Mount Carmel Eked Publications, Tel Aviv, Israel, 1979.
- Shin Shalom: New Poems: A Bilingual Edition, edited and translated from Hebrew to English by Ada Aharoni Eked, Tel Aviv, 1985. ISBN 9659013949.
- Selected Poems from Israel Lachman, Haifa, 1992. ISBN 9659013957
- Peace Poems, A Bilingual Edition Preface by M. Fawzi Daif, Cairo University, M. Lachman, Haifa, 1997.
- You and I Can Change the World: Toward 2000 Micha Lachman, Haifa, 1999.
- The Pomegranate: Love and Peace Poems Authorhouse. 2002. ISBN 9781403318718
- Selected Poems Bilingual, Chinese – English, The Milky Way, Hong Kong, 2002. ISBN 9624752885.
- Rare Flower: Collection of poems, dedicated to my departed daughter Tali, Dignity Press, USA, 2011.
- Horizon of Hope: Bilingual Collection of Poems, English, Hebrew. ." Gvanim, Tel Aviv. 2020.
- Toward a Horizon of Peace: Love, Peace and War poems 2021. ISBN 978-1387811434
- New Poems From Israel: Not In Your War Anymore 2016.

=== Magazines ===
- Aharoni, Ada, ed., Horizon: Pave Peace Online Magazine, nos.1 5. IFLAC IPRA, 1996–2003.
- Aharoni, Ada, ed., Galim Literary Magazine, numbers 1 8, Tammuz, Tel Aviv 1985–1996.
- Aharoni, Ada, ed., Lirit: Poetry Israel the Hebrew Writers Association, Agudat HaSofrim HaIvrim, Tel Aviv, no. 1 1997, no.2 1998.

=== IFLAC anthologies ===
- IFLAC Peace Anthology: Anti-Terror and Peace International Forum for the Literature and Culture of Peace. 2016.
- IFLAC Peace Anthology: Anti-War and Peace International Forum for the Literature and Culture of Peace.2018. ISBN 978-1980971948
- IFLAC Peace Anthology: Human Trafficking and Modern Slavery International Forum for the Literature and Culture of Peace. 2021. ISBN 9798775435080

=== Film ===
Ada Aharoni created the film The Pomegranate Of Reconciliation And Honor which highlights the need for peace between Israelis and Palestinians. Based on the author's personal experience and that of the Jews from Egypt, Ada Aharoni quotes Elie Wiesel's question at his Nobel Prize Ceremony:"Who is the enemy?" The enemy Wiesel says "Is the whose story you don't know!" Ada Aharoni tells her Palestinian friend that the Palestinian people have succeeded in telling the story of the 1948 Palestinian expulsion and flight, but Jews from Arab countries haven't succeeded in spreading similar awareness of the Jewish exodus from Arab and Muslim countries. In this film she tells her Palestinian neighbour her story in the hope that by the end of it they will be friends instead of enemies.
