= Michal Herzog =

First Lady of Israel since 2021

- מִיכָל הֶרְצוֹג
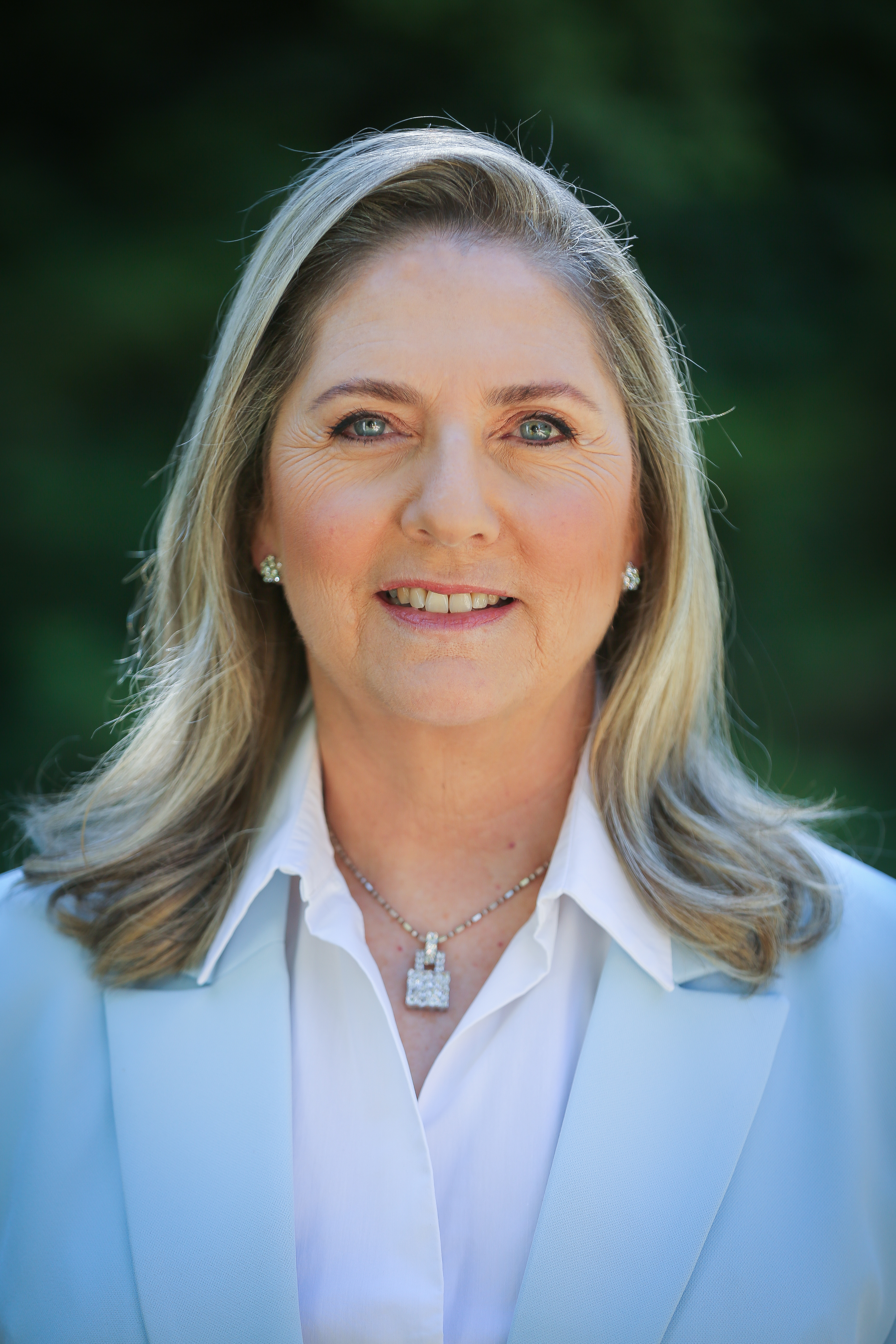
- Herzog in 2022

First Lady of Israel
- Assumed role 7 July 2021
- President: Isaac Herzog
- Preceded by: Nechama Rivlin (2019)

Personal details
- Born: Michal Afek; 15 May 1961 (age 65) Tel Aviv, Israel
- Spouse: Isaac Herzog (m. 1985)
- Occupation: Lawyer

Michal Herzog (Hebrew: מִיכָל הֶרְצוֹג) (née Afek) born 15 May 1961) is an Israeli lawyer who has served as First Lady of Israel since 2021 as the wife of President Isaac Herzog.

== Early life ==
Michal Afek was born in Tel Aviv. Her parents were Zvia (née Brin), a teacher from Afula and Shaul Afek, a member of the Palmach and Colonel in the Israeli Defence Forces. Michal Afek grew up in Tel Aviv and lived in Brazil and Canada for a period. During her time in the IDF, Afek served in the Intelligence Corps, where she met her future husband, Isaac Herzog, and they married in August 1985. They have three sons and live in Tel Aviv.

== Career ==
In 1986, Michal Herzog graduated from law school at Tel Aviv University and in 1988 received a license from the Israel Bar Association. She was hired by the law firm of Uri Slonim and has represented, among others, namely a bank robber Ronnie "Ofnobank" Leibowitz; head of the Shin Bet security branch, Dror Yitzhaki, before the establishment of the Shamgar Commission after the assassination of Yitzhak Rabin; and Bank Leumi in 1993 following the 1983 Israel bank stock crisis.

Herzog has served on the board of directors of Maala, an organization that works to promote corporate responsibility issues. She served as a director of Friedenson Logistics Services.

== First Lady of Israel ==
In 2021, her husband was elected president of Israel, making her the First Lady of Israel.

Since assuming the role, Herzog has been active in raising awareness of mental health issues in Israeli society in the wake of the Covid pandemic and its ramifications on children and youth.

In the wake of the October 7th attacks on Israel, Herzog has become one of the leading voices in exposing the use of sexual violence as a weapon of war by Hamas on October 7th and thereafter. Herzog sharply criticized international organizations for failing to speak out on the issue, writing that "Statement after statement by organizations like UN Women, the Committee on the Elimination of Discrimination against Women have failed to condemn these crimes. They failed us, and all women, at this critical moment."

Herzog has also consistently called out the rise of global antisemitism since October 7th.

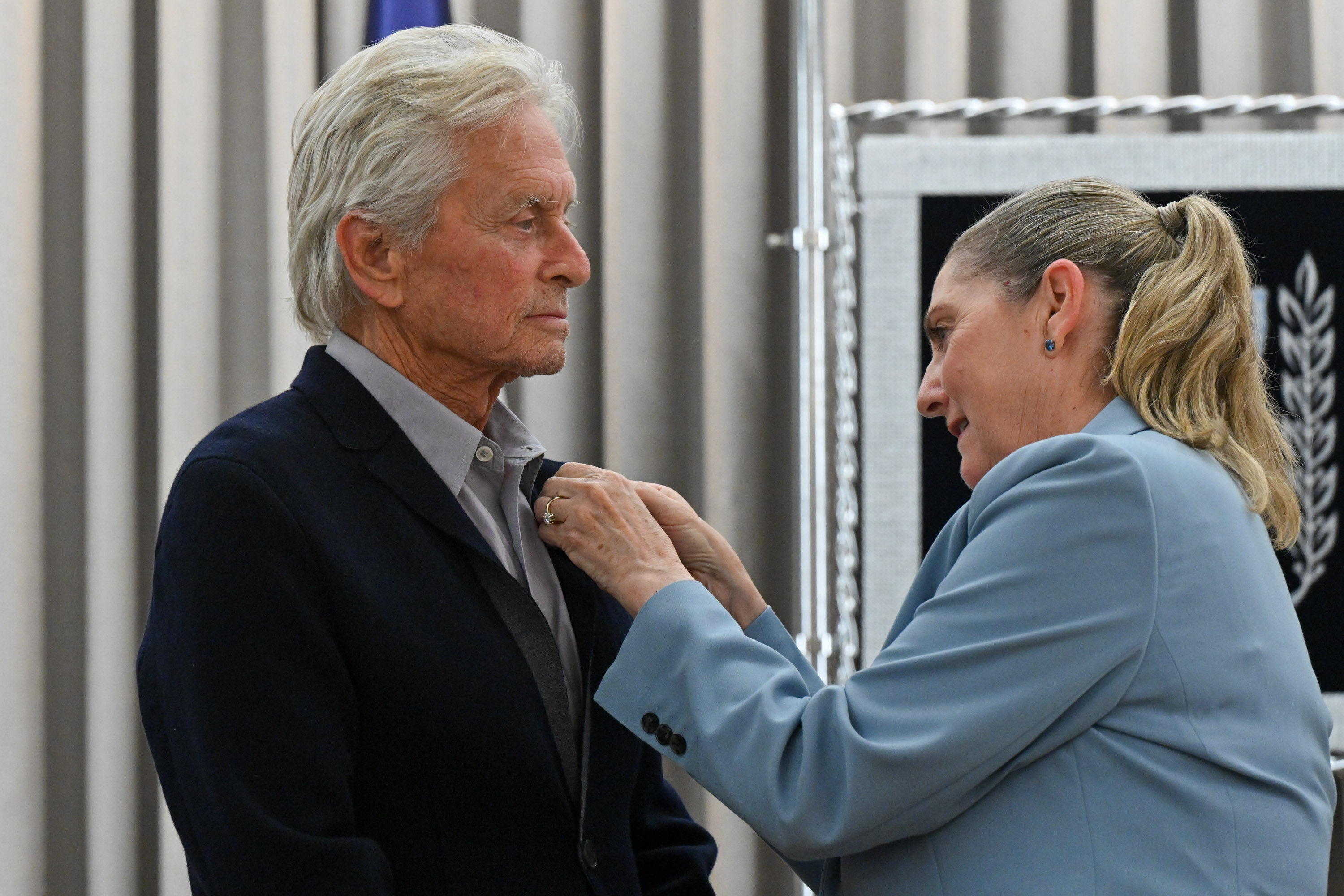
Michal Herzog hosted the actor Michael Douglas June 2024, given him the abductees pin with Yellow ribbon

Honorary titles
Vacant Title last held by Nechama Rivlin	First Lady of Israel; 2021–present	Incumbent
