= National Association of Anorexia Nervosa and Associated Disorders =

American nonprofit organization for eating disorders

- Abbreviation: ANAD
- Formation: 1976
- Founder: Vivian Meehan
- Headquarters: Chicago, IL
- Services: Eating Disorder Peer Support, Advocacy, Education
- Website: https://anad.org/

The National Association of Anorexia Nervosa and Associated Disorders (ANAD) is the oldest organization aimed at fighting eating disorders in the United States. ANAD assists people struggling with eating disorders such as anorexia nervosa and bulimia nervosa and also provides resources for families, schools and the eating disorder community. Headquartered in Chicago, Illinois, ANAD is a non-profit organization working in the areas of support, awareness, advocacy, referral, education, and prevention.

== History ==
In the early 1970s, Vivian Hanson Meehan, ANAD's president and founder, was a nurse at a hospital in Highland Park, Illinois. When a family member was diagnosed with anorexia nervosa, Vivian was unable to find any information or resources on eating disorders. Support was unavailable.

Meehan decided to do something simple to see if the experts were right: she placed a small classified ad in a local newspaper looking for others who were searching for information about anorexia nervosa. Within days the ad generated eight responses from those struggling with eating disorders and family members in her community. A national magazine picked up on the story and Meehan was deluged by thousands of phone calls and letters. She opened up her home and her heart and launched the first helpline and referral service in the nation for anorexia nervosa and associated eating disorders.

The small support group Meehan founded in her home went on to establish groups across the nation. These groups continue to provide peer-to-peer support and self-help for the individuals and families affected by eating disorders and are available at no cost.

Meehan was born in Sanish, North Dakota, in 1925. She became a Registered Nurse (RN) after graduation from the University of Minnesota School of Nursing. She was a supervisor of nurses and later director of the Department of Eating Disorders at Highland Park Hospital in Highland Park, Illinois.

== Programs ==
ANAD is a nonprofit in the U.S. that provides free, peer support services to anyone struggling with an eating disorder, regardless of age, race, gender identity, sexual orientation, or background.

ANAD's Helpline is available for treatment referrals, support and encouragement. Those who answer the phones offer support, encouragement and resources including referral to support groups, therapists and treatment centers.

ANAD also hosts a variety of weekly virtual support groups and a peer mentorship program for those struggling with an eating disorder.
