= First Lady of Israel =

Unofficial title of wife of the President of Israel

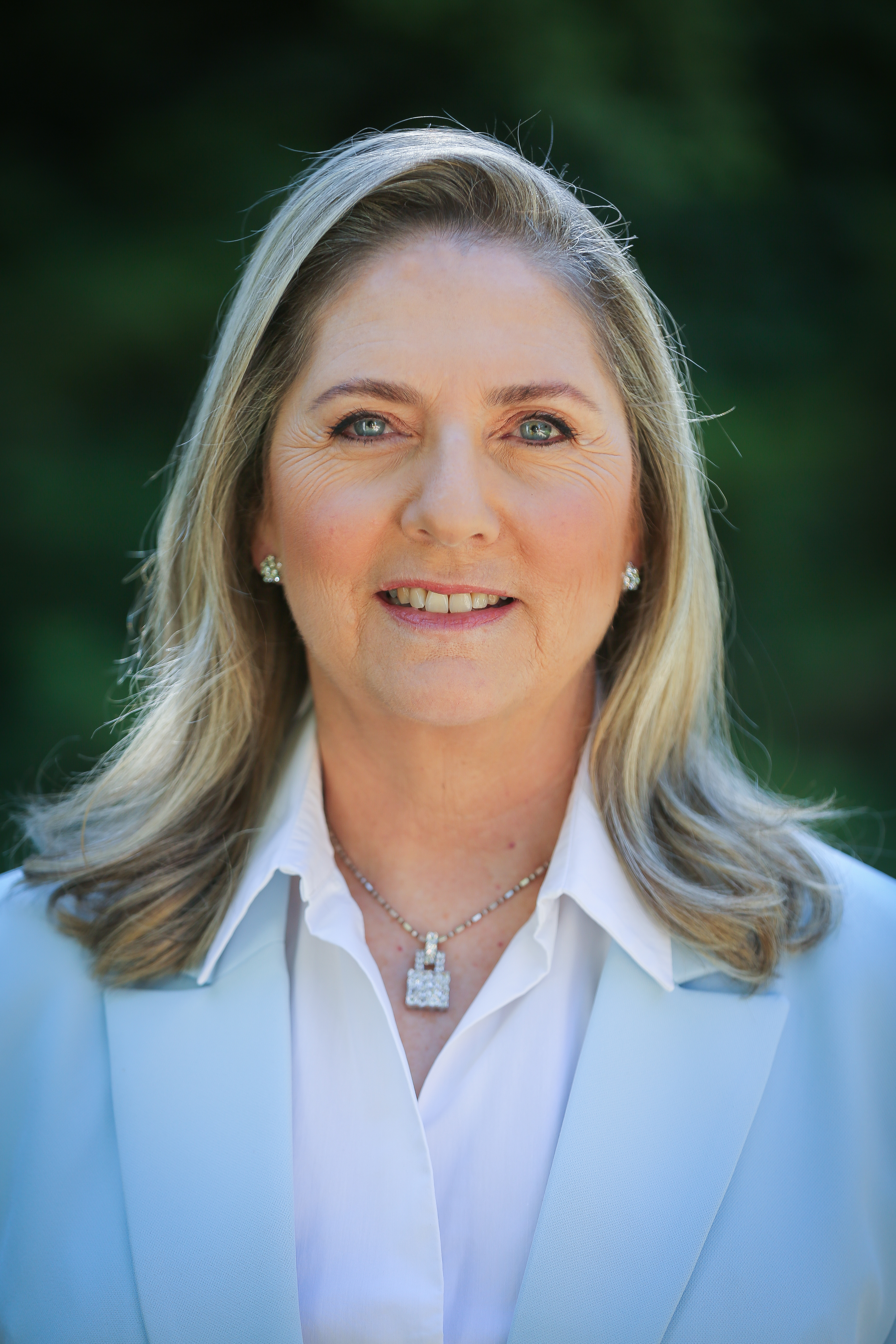
- Incumbent; Michal Herzog since 7 July 2021
- Residence: Beit HaNassi
- Appointer: Knesset
- Inaugural holder: Vera Weizmann
- Formation: 17 February 1949

First Lady of Israel (Hebrew: הגברת הראשונה של מדינת ישראל) is the unofficial title of the wife of the president of Israel, whose formal title is simply Spouse of the President of Israel (Hebrew: בת הזוג של נשיא מדינת ישראל). The current first lady of Israel is Michal Herzog, wife of President Isaac Herzog.

== History ==
There is no official role or office of the first lady of Israel, and the title "First Lady" was never adopted by the Ministerial Committee for Symbols and Ceremonies, although Reuven Rivlin's wife Nechama and Isaac Herzog's wife Michal were referred to as "First Lady" in English-language sources during their respective husbands' presidencies. In 2018, then–prime ministerial spouse Sara Netanyahu was introduced as "First Lady" when receiving US vice president Mike Pence, causing controversy.

== First ladies of Israel ==
Name	Portrait	Term began	Term ended	President of Israel	Notes
Vera Weizmann		17 February 1949	9 November 1952	Chaim Weizmann	Wife of the first President of Israel. Born in the Russian Empire and immigrated to the United Kingdom.
Rachel Yanait Ben-Zvi		16 December 1952	23 April 1963	Yitzhak Ben-Zvi	Born in present-day Ukraine, Ben-Zvi was an author, educator and leading proponent of Labor Zionism.
Rachel Katznelson-Shazar		21 May 1963	24 May 1973	Zalman Shazar	
Nina Katzir		24 May 1973	29 May 1978	Ephraim Katzir	
Ofira Navon		29 May 1978	5 May 1983	Yitzhak Navon	
Aura Herzog		5 May 1983	13 May 1993	Chaim Herzog	Founder of the Council for a Beautiful Israel
Reuma Weizman		13 May 1993	13 July 2000	Ezer Weizman	
Gila Katsav		1 August 2000	1 July 2007	Moshe Katsav	Gila Katsav's tenure ended on July 1, 2007, when her husband resigned the presidency.
Sonia Peres		15 July 2007	20 January 2011	Shimon Peres	Sonia Peres, who was Polish-born, disliked the role of wife of a politician and public figure. Though the country's first lady, she and Shimon Peres became estranged circa 2008 over his decision to remain in public office during their later life; the couple lived apart for the remainder of their lives. Sonia Peres died in role on January 20, 2011, at the age of 87.
Position vacant		20 January 2011	24 July 2014	Shimon Peres	First Lady Sonia Peres had died on January 20, 2011, while Shimon Peres was still in office.
Nechama Rivlin		24 July 2014	4 June 2019	Reuven Rivlin	Nechama Rivlin was a researcher and scientist at Hebrew University. She died in role from complications of a lung transplant on June 4, 2019.
Position vacant		4 June 2019	7 July 2021	Reuven Rivlin	First Lady Nechama Rivlin died on June 4, 2019.
Michal Herzog		7 July 2021	Present	Isaac Herzog	First Lady Michal Herzog is a lawyer.

== See also ==
- Spouse of the prime minister of Israel
- Women in Israel
- The First Lady of the State of Israel Prize for Hebrew Poetry
