= Presidency of Isaac Herzog =

Israel presidency since 2021

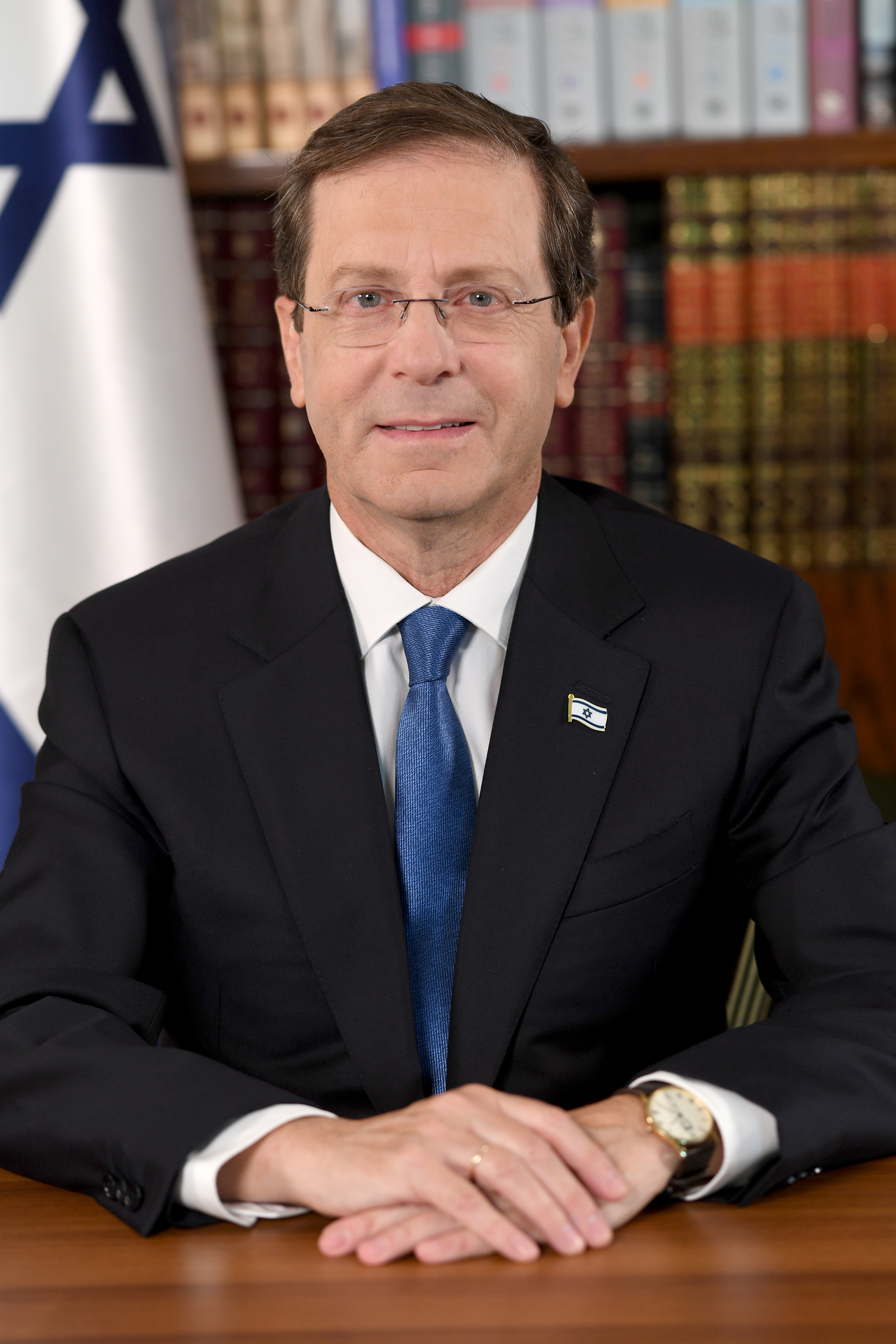
- Official portrait, 2021
- Presidency of Isaac Herzog; 7 July 2021 – present
- Premier: Naftali Bennett Yair Lapid Benjamin Netanyahu
- Party: Independent
- Election: 2021
- Seat: Beit HaNassi
- Presidential Standard

The Presidency of Isaac Herzog, the eleventh President of Israel, began after the 2021 Israeli presidential election on 2 June 2021. Herzog was sworn in as president on 7 July 2021.

== 2021 Presidential election ==
On 2 June 2021, Herzog was elected President of the State of Israel by the Knesset. Running as an independent against Miriam Peretz, a record 87 of 120 members of the Knesset voted for him.

== Inauguration ==
On 7 July 2021, Herzog was sworn in at a ceremony at the Knesset, using the same 107-year-old Bible that his father Chaim Herzog used when sworn in as President in 1983. In his inaugural address, he called for healing the divisions in Israeli society and building bridges within Israel and between Israel and the Jewish diaspora. Herzog said: “Baseless hatred, the same factionalism and polarization, are exacting a heavy price today, and every day. The heaviest price of all is the erosion of our national resilience. My mission, the goal of my presidency, is to do everything to rebuild hope.”

== 2021 ==
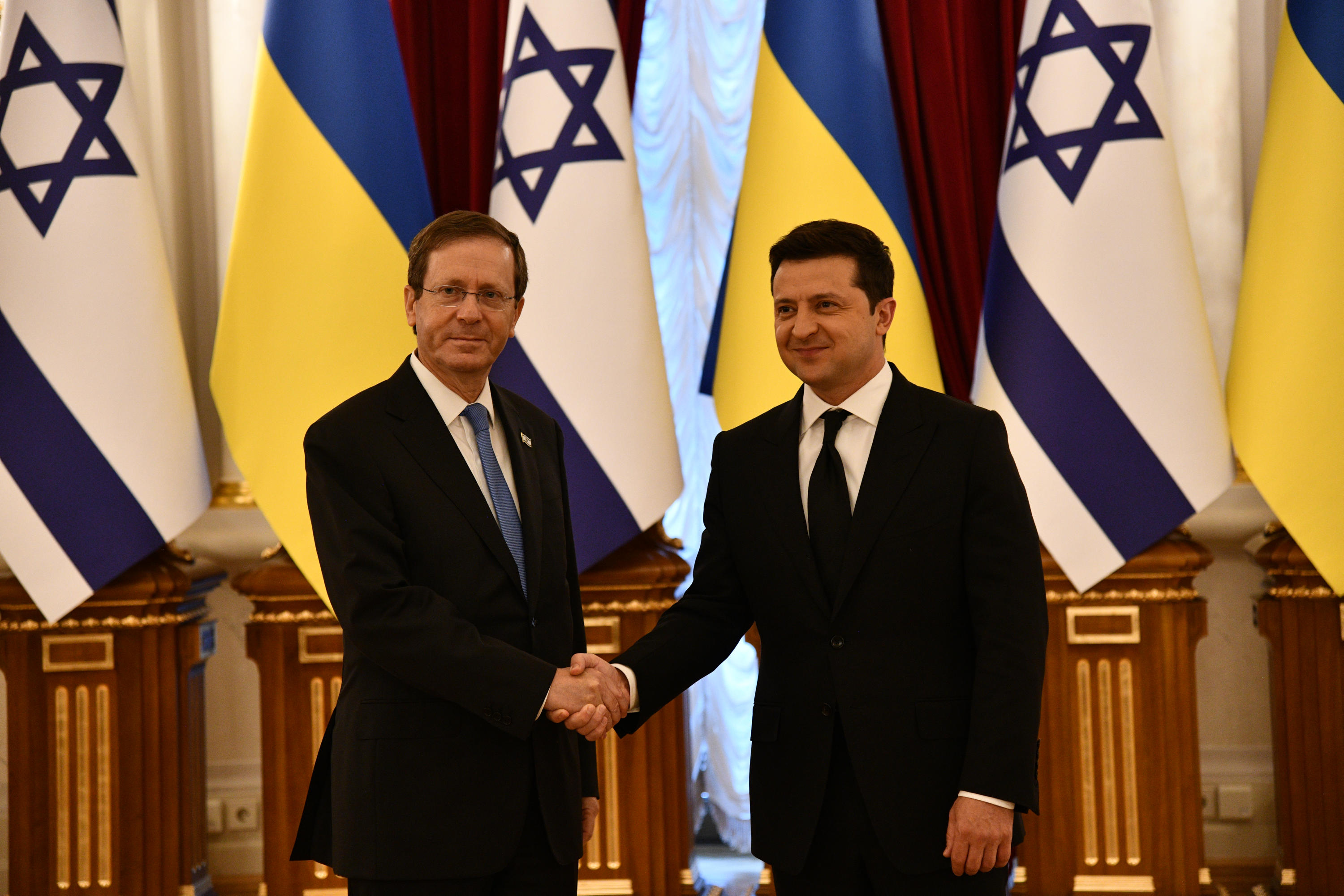
Herzog with Ukrainian President Volodymyr Zelenskyy in Kyiv, Ukraine, October 2021

In July 2021, Herzog kicked off the campaign to receive the third dose of the coronavirus vaccine. He did this with his wife Michal Herzog as well as Prime Minister Bennett.

On October 4, 2021, in his first speech to the Knesset Plenum since his election, Herzog called the rise in violence in Israeli Arab society “a state of emergency, which requires us all to take firm action together." Herzog’s calls on successive governments and law enforcement agencies to act against violence in the Israeli Arab sector would become a consistent theme of his presidency.

In October 2021, Herzog announced the establishment of the Israeli Climate Forum under the auspices of the Office of the President, appointing former Member of Knesset Dov Khenin as the forum's chairman. Bringing together figures from different sectors of Israeli society such as academia, local government, the Knesset, culture, media and the economic sector, the forum oversees a number of working groups focusing on different issues and brings together public officials and private citizens to coordinate efforts to combat the climate crisis. In his "Renewable Middle East" speech, delivered at the Haaretz Climate Change Forum, Herzog spelled out a vision for how the climate crisis presented opportunities for regional cooperation across the Middle East and Mediterranean Basin.

Further to his declared objective of embarking on a journey within Israeli society, and as part of his public engagements in Israel and visits to its diverse communities, on 29 October 2021 Herzog participated in a memorial for the victims of the 1956 Kafr Qasim massacre and apologized on behalf of the State of Israel, making him the first Israeli official to ask for forgiveness at the official ceremony in Kafr Qasim. In his speech, Herzog said: "The killing and injury of innocents are absolutely forbidden. They must remain beyond all political arguments."

On 28 November 2021, Herzog lit candles for the first night of Hanukkah at the Cave of the Patriarchs in Hebron. Herzog declared that recognition of the Jewish people's historical attachments to Hebron "must be beyond all controversy"

In December 2021, Herzog launched his "Think Good" campaign, with the objective of combating cyberbullying. The campaign, in collaboration with Meta, promoted respectful and inclusive discourse online.

== 2022 ==
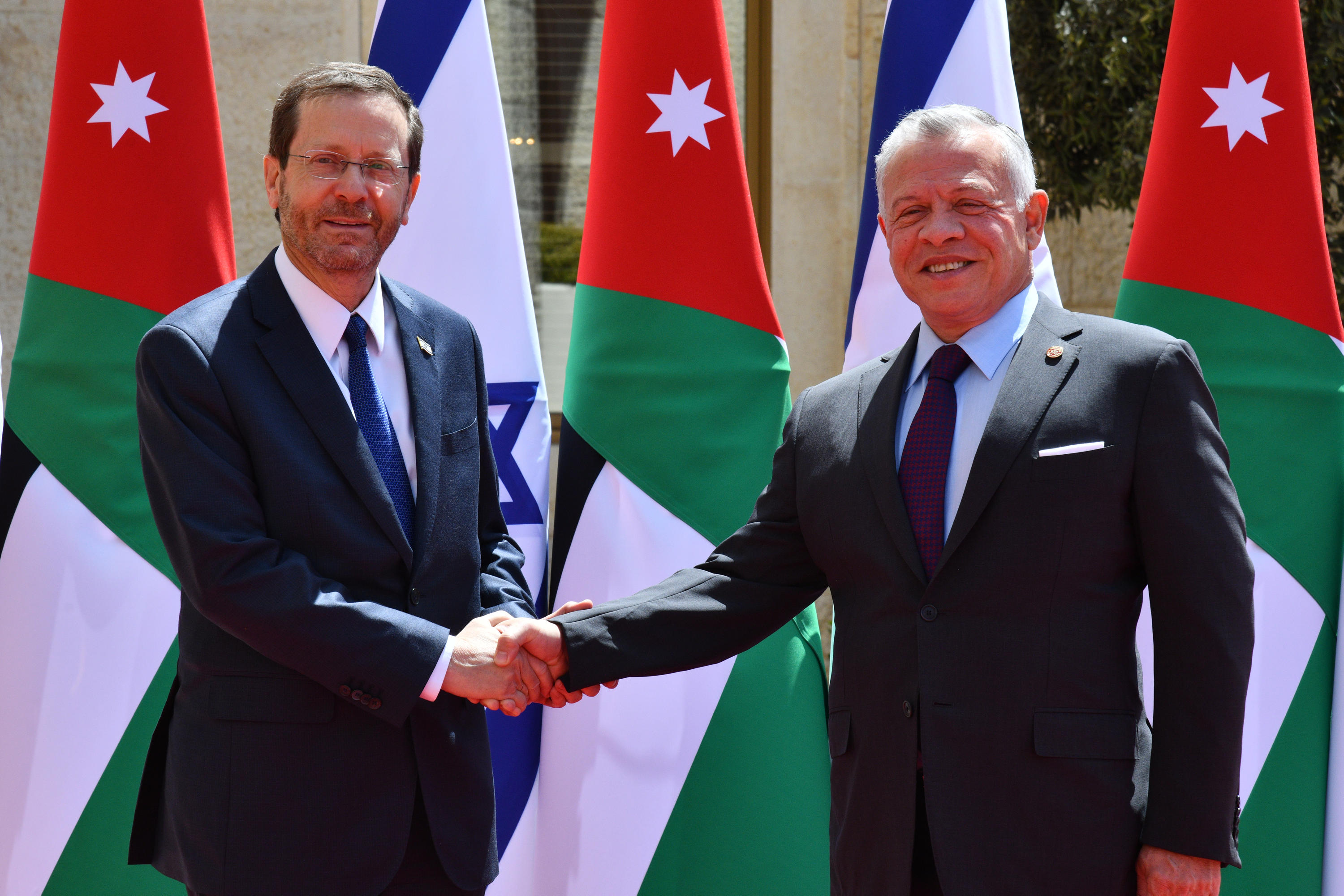
Herzog with King Abdullah II in Amman, Jordan, 30 March 2022

On 30 January 2022, Herzog conducted a historic state visit to the United Arab Emirates. This was the first visit of an Israeli president to the UAE and came at the invitation of Sheikh Mohammed bin Zayed Al Nahyan.

In March 2022, Herzog embarked on a regional tour of neighboring Mediterranean states, taking in Greece, Cyprus, and a state visit to Turkey together with First Lady Michal Herzog, as the guests of President Recep Tayyip Erdoğan and his wife Emine. Following months of dialogue since Herzog's election as president, the presidents met for a summit at the Presidential Complex in Ankara, symbolizing their countries' desire to move on from a period of tense relations. During the visit, Herzog addressed the "baggage of the past", which he said "never disappears of its own accord", and underscored that the Israeli-Turkish relationship would be determined by both states' actions. In the latter part of his Turkish visit, as part of a broader policy of strengthening relations with the Jewish Diaspora during foreign engagements, Herzog and his wife Michal visited the Istanbul Jewish community at the Neve Shalom Synagogue, the target of various terror attacks over the years. On 29 March 2022, Herzog conducted a historic first public visit by an Israeli leader to Amman, Jordan, during which he met King Abdullah II, with whom he discussed to deepen the Israeli–Jordanian relationship, maintain regional stability, and bolster peace and normalization.

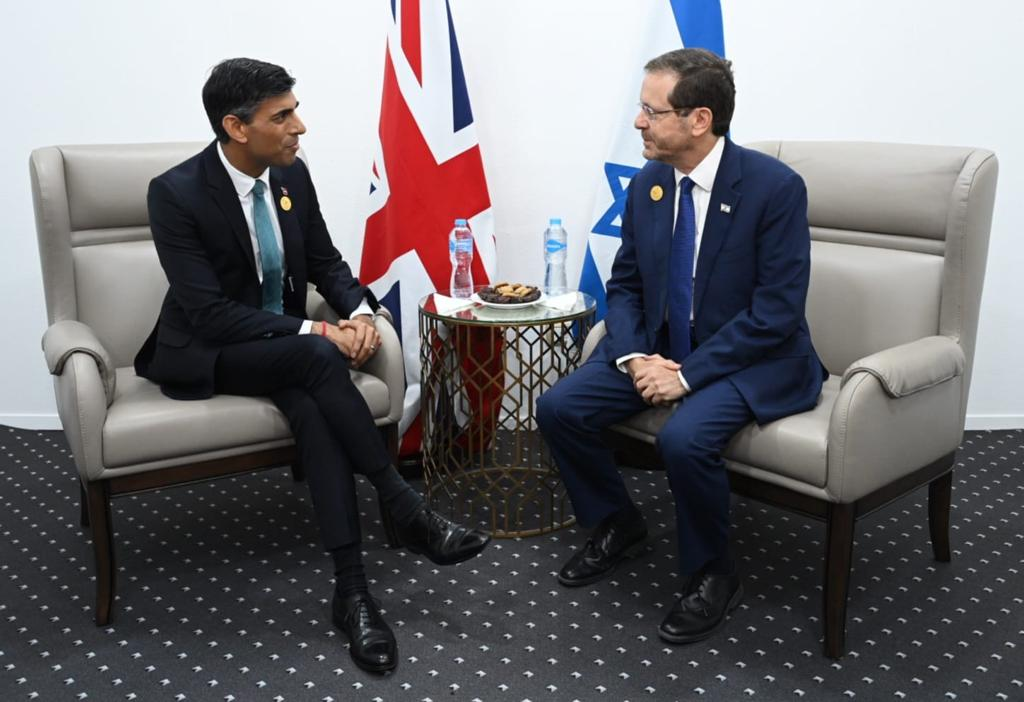
Herzog with British Prime Minister Rishi Sunak in November 2022

In July 2022, Herzog awarded the Israeli Presidential Medal of Honor to President Biden.

In July 2022, Herzog appointed Brigadier General Naama Rosen-Grimberg as Military Secretary to the President of the State of Israel. She was the first woman to fulfill this role.

In September 2022, Herzog and his wife traveled to London to pay their respects to the deceased Queen Elizabeth II.

Prior to the parliamentary elections of 2022, Israel’s public broadcaster Kan 11 reported that Herzog told Knesset members that he would “work to establish a unity government as broad as possible” after the elections. In the November 2022 elections, Likud and its far-right allies won a majority of 64 seats in the Knesset. Following this, President Herzog tasked Benjamin Netanyahu with forming the new government. On December 21, 2022, Netanyahu informed Herzog that he had formed a government.

== 2023 ==
In January 2023, Herzog launched the "Time to Talk" movement. Confronted with the challenge of polarization in Israeli society and a general inability to manage disagreements, President Herzog has decided to focus his efforts on making the State of Israel and Israeli society more cohesive and capable of engaging fearlessly with the disagreements that divide it. “Time to Talk” translates the President’s vision into an action plan. This broad plan outlines the establishment of an innovative and educational visitors’ center as well as spaces for consensus-building at the President’s Residence and beyond it, across Israeli society and the whole Jewish world.

On 12 February 2023, in the midst of the public debate on legal reform, Herzog delivered a speech to the nation in which he sought to reach a compromise on the issue. He asked the head of the Constitution, Law and Justice Committee, Simcha Rothman, to stop the legislation, and not to bring the bill to a first reading in the Knesset.

In March 2023, using the office of the President, Herzog invited both sides to the President's Residence for negotiations.

As the legislation and protests against it progressed, on 9 March, President Herzog delivered a speech to the nation, in which he called for the legislation to be stopped and replaced with a different outline, stating: "The entire body of legislation currently being discussed in committee must be thrown out quickly. It is wrong, predatory, and undermines our democratic foundations." On 15 March, Herzog presented the 'People's Outline' for a compromise. On 12 June, he called for the army to be kept out of the debate: "As citizens, reservists have the full right to any opinion and protest, like all citizens in a healthy democracy. As soldiers in the reserves, wearing uniforms, refusal is out of bounds. We must not endanger Israel's security because it is in our souls."

In July 2023, Herzog condemned the attacks on Christians in Israel. “I utterly condemn violence, in all its forms, directed by a small and extreme group, towards the holy places of the Christian faith, and against Christian clergy in Israel in general, and in Jerusalem in particular. This includes spitting, and the desecration of graves and churches,” he said.

On 19 July 2023, Herzog was invited to deliver a speech to a joint session of the U.S. Congress to mark the 75 years of independence of the State of Israel. In his address, Herzog highlighted the strength of the U.S.-Israel relationship, the regional challenges facing Israel, and threat of terror as an obstacle to peace between Israel and the Palestinians.

In the immediate aftermath of the 7 October attacks by Hamas on Israel, President Herzog delivered a special address to the nation in which he stated: “This heinous act, which began in the middle of the Sabbath on a Jewish holy day, crossing the border to carry out the attack, is an unforgivable sin. A sin that was led not only by a murderous terrorist organization, but by an evil axis whose base is in Iran and whose malignant cells repeatedly work to undermine us, our spirit, our sovereignty, and who we are as a people and as a country. My brothers and sisters: we are in a war for our home, and we will win!”

Writing in the New York Times shortly after the attack, Herzog wrote: “Against our will, we in Israel find ourselves at a tipping point for the Middle East and for the world and at the center of what is nothing less than an existential struggle. This is not a battle between Jews and Muslims. And it is not just between Israel and Hamas. It is between those who adhere to norms of humanity and those practicing a barbarism that has no place in the modern world.”

At a press conference for the international media held shortly after the 7 October attacks, President Herzog was asked about Israel's possible military response and said that "an entire nation out there is responsible", a remark that was later cited in accusations that he had assigned collective responsibility to the Palestinian people. President Herzog strongly rejected those claims, arguing that his words had been “purposely distorted” and taken out of context. In the same answer at the press conference, he stated: "We are working, operating militarily according to rules of international law. Period. Unequivocally. But we are at war. There are many, many innocent Palestinians." This comment would, in September 2025, be described by a United Nations inquiry into the Gaza Genocide as "incitement to genocide", forming part of a pattern of behaviour demonstrating genocidal intent in the actions and statements of Israeli political leaders.

On 17 October 2023, Herzog said that accusations that Israel caused the al-Ahli Arab Hospital explosion were "a 21st-century blood libel". On 22 October, he told Britain's Sky News that Hamas fighters captured by Israel were carrying instructions from al-Qaeda on how to make chemical weapons, including a chemical bomb, saying "we are dealing with ISIS, Al-Qaeda and Hamas".

On 1 December 2023, Herzog attended the COP28 climate summit in Dubai, United Arab Emirates, where he met with UAE President Sheikh Mohammed bin Zayed Al Nahyan and had a handshake with Qatar's Emir Tamim bin Hamad Al Thani.

== 2024 ==
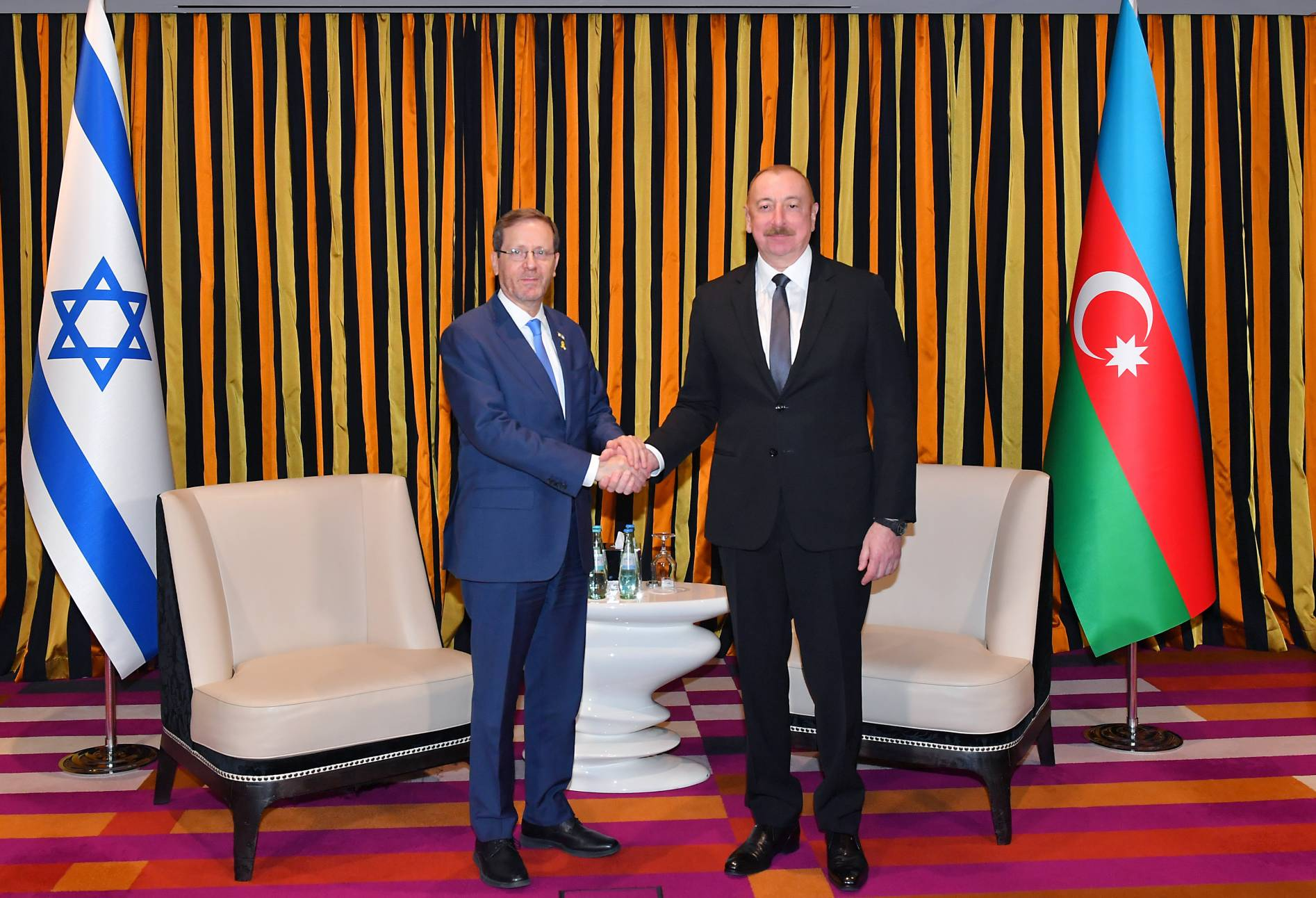
Herzog and Azerbaijan's President Ilham Aliyev at the 60th Munich Security Conference, 16 February 2024

During Herzog's 2024 visit to the World Economic Forum in Switzerland, the Swiss Federal Prosecutor's Office announced that it was investigating a criminal complaint against him. The nature of the complaint was not disclosed and was later dropped.

He called South Africa's genocide case against Israel in the International Court of Justice (ICJ) a "blood libel" against Jews.

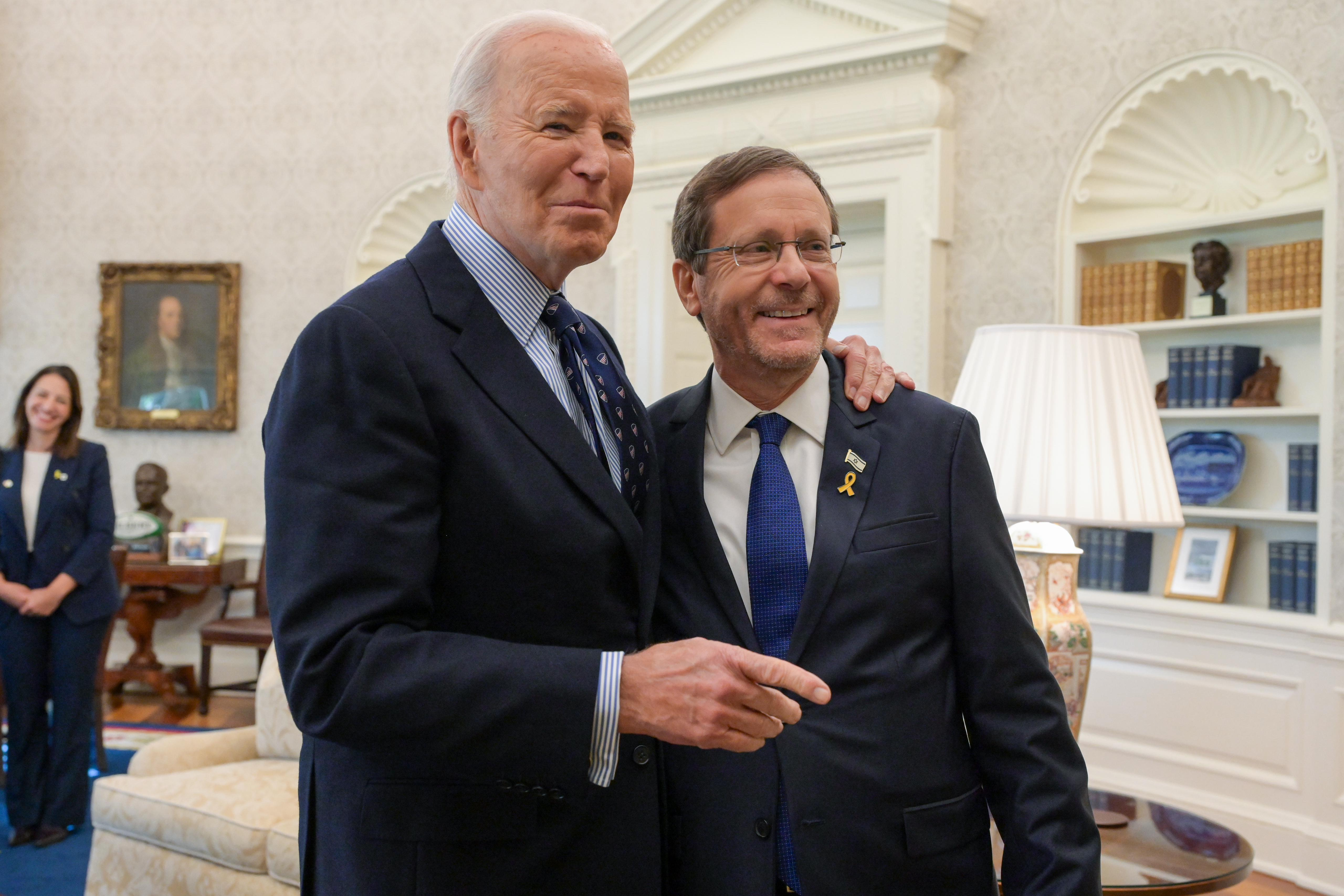
Herzog with U.S. President Joe Biden at the White House in Washington, D.C., 12 November 2024

On 28 March 2024, Herzog said he considered U.S. President Joe Biden to be a "great friend of Israel". On 12 November 2024, Herzog arrived in Washington, D.C. for a state visit and met with Biden. He told Biden: "In the Bible, it says that Joseph will strengthen Israel. And clearly, Mr. President, you've done that."

Herzog expressed his support for the establishment of a state commission of inquiry into Hamas’s October 7 massacre.

Two days after Donald Trump's election victory on November 5, 2024, Herzog called Trump to congratulate him. In a readout from the call, Herzog's office said he "emphasized the urgent need to secure the return of the Israeli hostages, who have been held captive by Hamas for 400 days, enduring unimaginable cruelty and suffering." It was reported that Herzog said to Trump on the call that "You have to save the hostages." In response, Trump said almost all of the hostages have most likely died. Herzog then told Trump that Israeli intelligence services believed half of them were still alive, which "surprised" Trump, who said he wasn't aware of that.

On 21 November 2024, the UN-backed International Criminal Court (ICC) issued arrest warrants for Israeli Prime Minister Benjamin Netanyahu and former Defence Minister Yoav Gallant. Herzog condemned the ICC's decision, saying, "It ignores Hamas's cynical use of its own people as human shields. It ignores the basic fact that Israel was barbarically attacked and has the duty and right to defend its people. It ignores the fact that Israel is a vibrant democracy, acting under international humanitarian law, and going to great lengths to provide for the humanitarian needs of the civilian population."

== 2025 ==
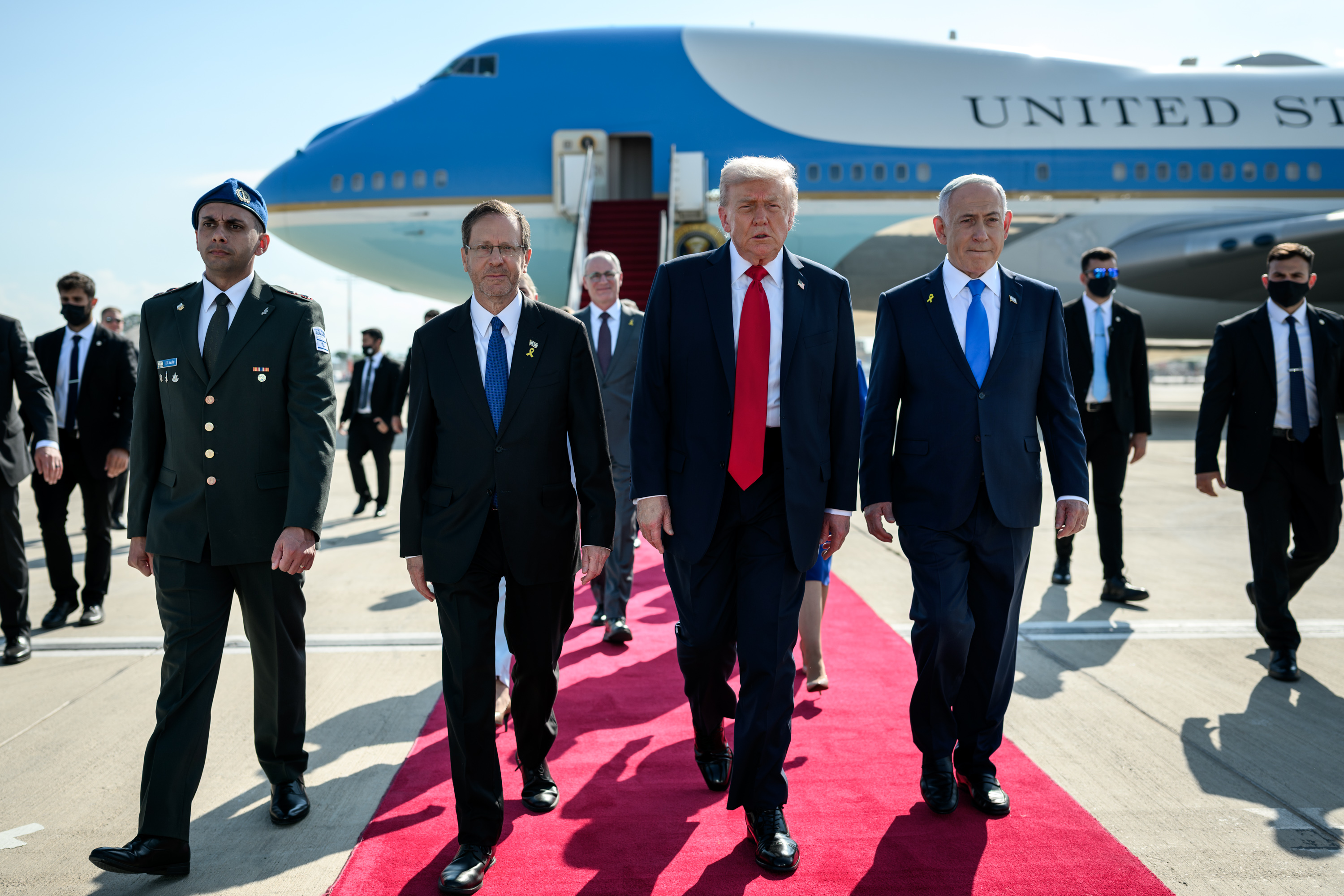
Herzog with U.S. president Donald Trump, and Netanyahu in October 2025

Throughout the war, Herzog has been a leading advocate in international forums for the release of the hostages held in Gaza. In January 2025, while addressing a special session of the United Nations General Assembly marking International Holocaust Memorial Day, Herzog said: “Near my heart, I wear a yellow pin. A pin that symbolizes anticipation, hope, and a resounding cry to all humanity: bring back our tortured children and elderly, our women and men, from the tunnels of terror in Gaza – home, to Israel.”

In March 2025, Herzog's Voice of the People initiative to gather a range of Jewish voices from all over the world to discuss issues and challenges affecting the Jewish people and to transform this dialogue into actionable strategies took place.

In May 2025, Herzog and his wife visited Germany on a state trip to mark 60 years of diplomatic relations between Israel and Germany. The following day, German President Frank-Walter Steinmeier and his wife Elke Büdenbender made a reciprocal visit returning with the Herzogs to Israel. Herzog awarded Steinmeier the Israeli Presidential Medal of Honor.

In June 2025, Herzog spoke out about Operation Rising Lion saying “I call upon the leaders of the free world convening in Canada, in the G7 Summit. They all should stand up with us, and make clear two things: Iran must not have any capability of nuclear weapons, and secondly, bring back our hostages as soon as possible, till the last one of them, immediately." Herzog then visited missile impact sites across the country. He met with Pope Leo XIV in September 2025: the Vatican's press release states that "hope was expressed" during their discussion "for a prompt resumption of negotiations" regarding the Israeli hostages held by Hamas and the ending of the Gaza conflict.

Herzog warmly welcomed the deal brokered by President Trump to secure the release of the remaining hostages held in Gaza. Herzog welcomed the hostages back home, saying “I wish to extend my deepest thanks to President Donald Trump for his incredible leadership toward securing the release of the hostages, bringing an end to the war, and creating hope for a new reality in the Middle East.” In recognition of Trump’s efforts to secure their release, Herzog announced that he would award him with the Israeli Presidential Medal of Honor. Herzog later gave full endorsement of UN Security Council Resolution 2803, that adopted the U.S.’s 20-point peace plan, and the establishment of the Board of Peace. In October 2025, Herzog addressed the Knesset Plenum on at the Twenty-Fifth Knesset. He abandoned his prepared remarks and called out the boycott of the Chief Justice of the Supreme Court saying “We are at a moment of trial, we are in an election year; we can behave with restraint or continue to poke each other's eyes out—I am saying to everyone, it's enough.”

On 12 November 2025, Herzog’s office published a letter sent by Trump calling on Herzog to “fully pardon Benjamin Netanyahu.” In response, Herzog’s office said: “President Herzog holds President Trump in the highest regard and continues to express his deep appreciation for President Trump’s unwavering support for Israel, his tremendous contribution to the return of the hostages, to reshaping the situation in the Middle East and Gaza especially, and to ensuring the security of the State of Israel. Alongside and not withstanding this, as the Office of the President has made clear throughout, anyone seeking a Presidential pardon must submit a formal request in accordance with the established procedures.” On 30 November 2025, Netanyahu formally asked Herzog for a pardon on his corruption cases. In his first public appearance following the request, Herzog reiterated that "the well-being of the Israeli people is my first, second, and third priority".

== 2026 ==
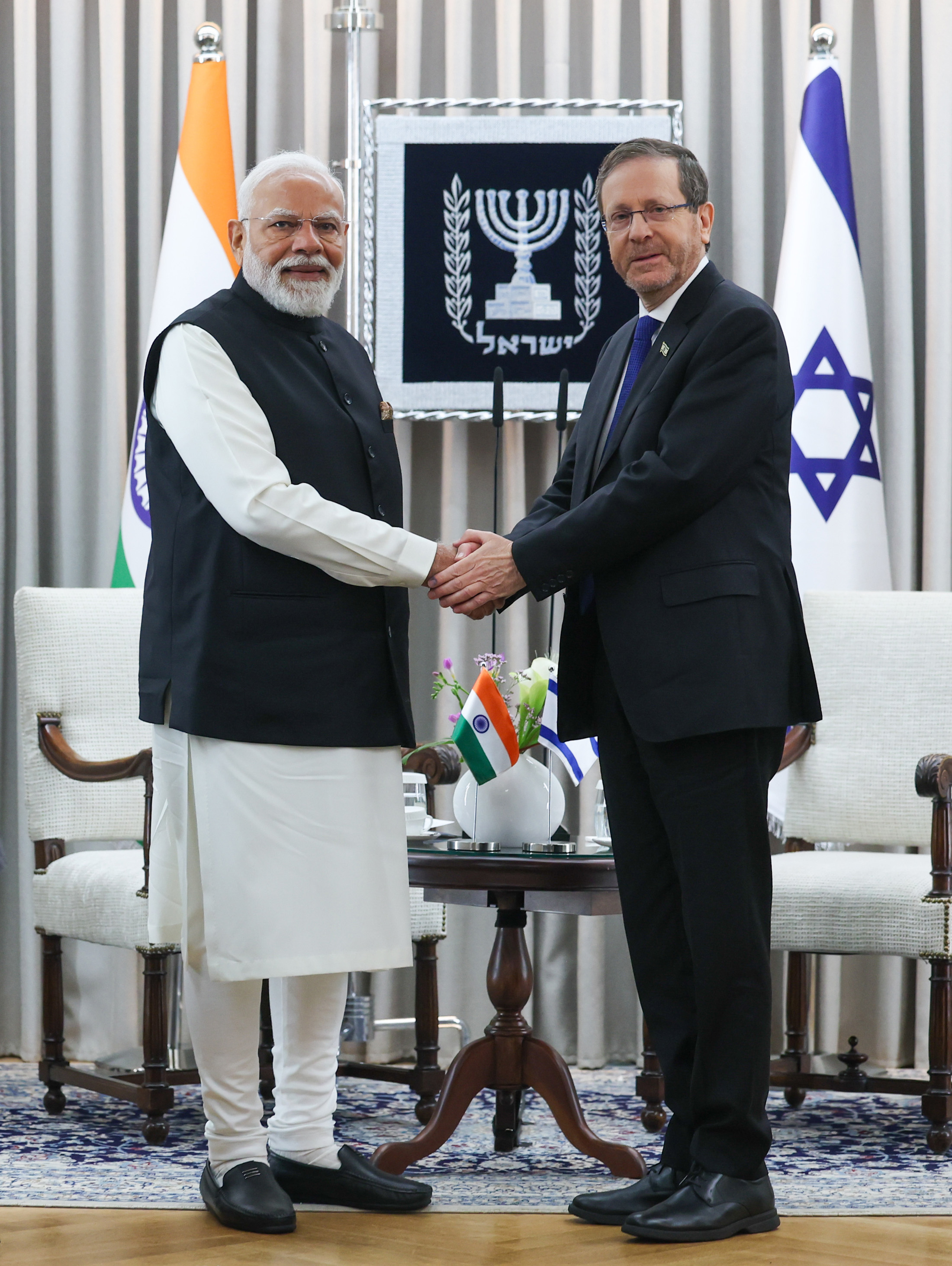
Herzog with Indian Prime Minister Narendra Modi in February 2026

Following the 2025 Bondi Beach shooting at a Jewish community event in Sydney, Australian Prime Minister Anthony Albanese invited Herzog to make an official visit to Australia in February 2026 to comfort the Jewish community in the wake of the attack. During his visit, Herzog visited the site of the Bondi attack, where he also met survivors and victims' families, and he addressed large Jewish communal events in both Sydney and Melbourne. In Canberra, Governor-General Sam Mostyn hosted Herzog and his wife at Government House, and Herzog met with Albanese at the Australian Parliament. Following protests prior to and during the visit, police presence was increased across Australia during the visit.

Since first calling on Herzog to grant Netanyahu a pardon in 2025, Trump made remarks in public and to the media criticizing Herzog on the matter. The opinion paper of the Justice Ministry on the pardon was submitted to Herzog, to be first reviewed by his legal advisor Michal Tzuk, on 24 March 2026 by Heritage Minister Amichay Eliyahu as the Justice Minister Yariv Levin recused himself because of the conflict of interest created by his having served as a witness for the defense in the trial of Netanyahu, with Eliyahu reportedly advising in favour of a pardon in order to "heal the rifts" within the Israeli political fabric, going against the recommendation of the Pardons Department.. On 28 April 2026, Herzog’s legal advisor Michal Tsuk, wrote to the parties in the cases against Netanyahu and invited them to conduct discussions at the President's Residence with the aim of reaching agreements, constituting “a preliminary step before the President considers exercising the pardon authority.”

In early March 2026, Herzog argued in favour of the 2026 Iran War, saying "I think NATO members should support it, I think European nations should support it, because we are actually protecting Europe by doing this", and said that the decision to begin the war was taken by the United States, with Herzog saying "This is a decision of President Trump,... he's the leader of the free world. He doesn't need Israel to take him anywhere." During the war, Herzog visited sites across the country which had been struck, meeting with residents and emergency rescue volunteers.

After the Latin Patriarch of Jerusalem Pierbattista Pizzaballa was blocked by police from preparing for the celebration of Palm Sunday Mass at the Church of the Holy Sepulchre due to a ban on large gatherings on 29 March 2026, Herzog called Pizaballa to express his regret over the incident. Following the resolution of the incident, the Latin Patriarchate of Jerusalem and the Custody of the Holy Land expressed “sincere gratitude to His Excellency Mr. Isaac Herzog, President of the State of Israel, for his prompt attention and valued intervention.”

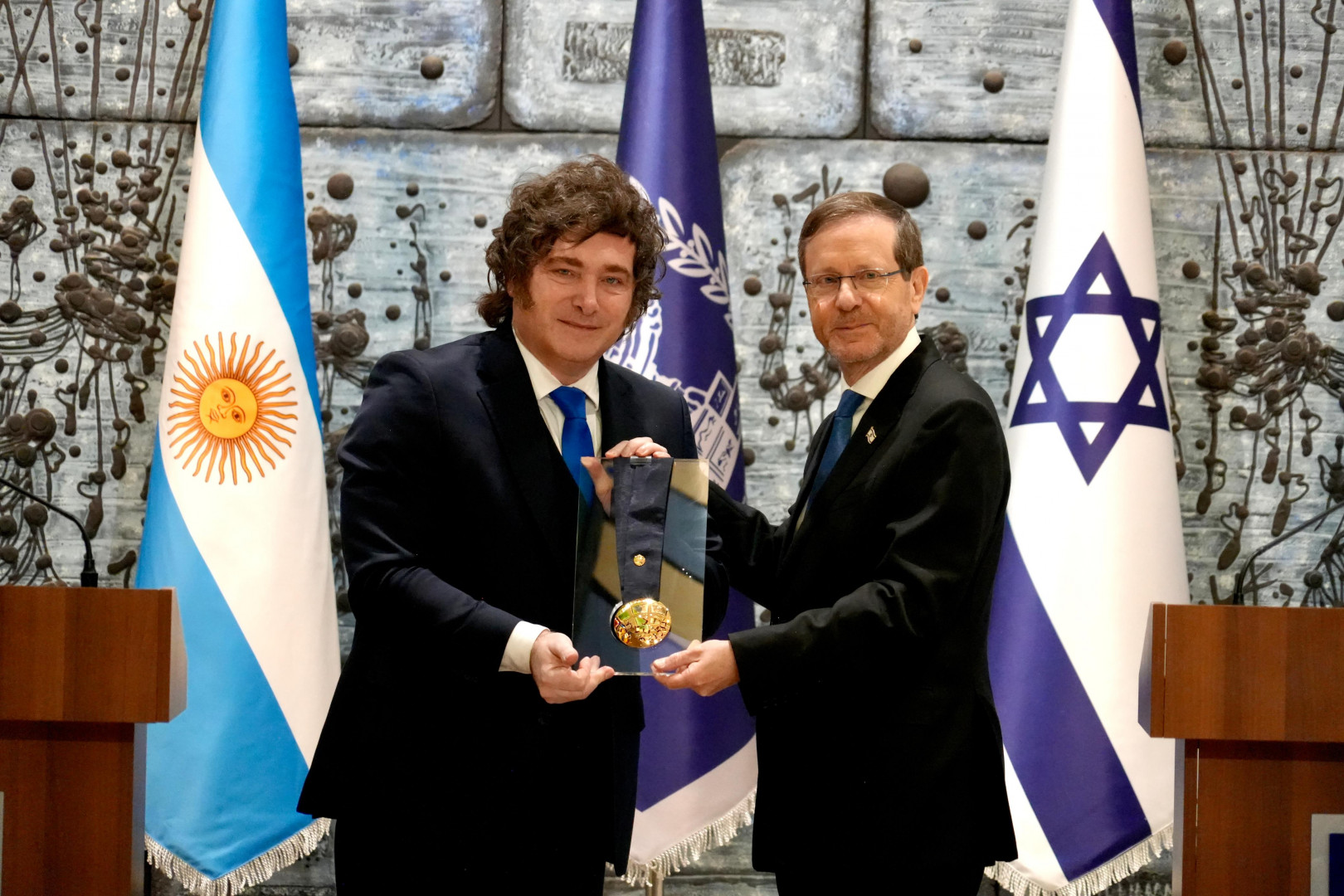
Herzog with Javier Milei in April 2026

On 13 April 2026, it was announced that Herzog would award President of Argentina Javier Milei with the Presidential Medal of Honor, with the announcement of Herzog's office describing the award for Milei as "recognition of his consistent and outspoken commitment to Israel since assuming office in 2023".

In June 2026, the President and First Lady hosted President Abdirahman Mohamed Abdillahi of the Republic of Somaliland and First Lady Fardowsa Mohamed Roble on their first-ever visit to Israel.

In July 2026, Herzog said calls by the government to disobey a Supreme Court ruling “crossed a red line”. The government later walked back on its stance, with the cabinet secretary, Yossi Fuchs, saying the resolution did not explicitly defy the Supreme Court order.

On 1 July 2026, Herzog opened the 2026 Maccabiah Games, where he described Israel as the “home away from home” of international participants.

On 2 July 2026, Herzog marked the milestone of 1000 days since the October 7 attacks by hosting an event in Kibbutz Kerem Shalom, where he said "Our enemy made no distinction among us. He came to destroy us all. Our answer, and our true victory, lies in action: in rebuilding and in returning to the kibbutzim. Our answer is in the laughter of children in kindergartens filling the communities of the South and North once again."

Speaking at an event marking the anniversary of the death of Theodor Herzl on 5 July 2026, Herzog condemned the statement made by Turkish Foreign Minister Hakan Fidan, who had described Israel as "a burden that humanity can no longer bear", retorting that "Israel is here to stay, and it is a blessing to the world" and describing the words of Fidan as antisemitic.

During his presidency, strengthening Jewish-Muslim relations in Israeli society has been a key priority for Herzog. On July 9, 2026, in the first such ceremony in almost a decade, Herzog swore in five new Qadis, judges of Islamic law, to serve in Israel’s Sharia courts during a ceremony at the President's Residence in Jerusalem.

On 17 July 2026, in an interview with Saudi state-owned Al Arabiya TV station at the President's Residence, Herzog stated that his “heart aches” for every innocent Palestinian civilian who is killed in the Gaza war.

Herzog delivered a televised address to the nation at the beginning of Israel's election campaign; urged Israelis to "remember that elections are not a civil war."

On 30 September 2026, Herzog described the rise of settler violence in the West Bank as "nationalist crime" which “phenomena that go to the root of our ability to function as a state, undermine our ability to exercise sovereignty and Israel’s rule of law.” On 17 October, Herzog phoned journalist Heidi Levine, who had been attacked by settlers, to apologise and say that the "despicable behavior of these criminals does not represent the citizens and values of the State of Israel".

Following Herzog's visit to the Judea and Samaria Division headquarters on 30 September 2026, he warned in a letter to Benjamin Netanyahu that “A severe flare-up on the ground is liable to carry severe and far-reaching consequences, both for Israel’s security and its functioning as a sovereign state, and for Israel’s international standing, Diaspora Jewry, the Israeli economy, and more,” and described settler violence as a “moral disgrace and the stain on us”.

In October 2026, following President Donald Trump's endorsement of Benjamin Netanyahu in the 2026 Israeli legislative election, Herzog spoke to U.S. media and denied that any outside influences would impact his decision in who he would choose to form a government following the election, saying “I don’t think the president of the United States or anybody else can intervene in my discretion — the discretion has to be based on certain facts, and we will see what the facts are," while also saying he would attempt to prevent the need for a repeat election due to no party being able to form a viable governing coalition.

Following the 2026 Israeli legislative election, Herzog invited political leaders to meet with him and hold coalition talks on 4 November, prior to his exercising of his discretion as to who to invite to attempt to form a governing coalition. He said that leaders should “stop climbing up trees, and face the reality” of the results of the election and that they should be prepared to "find creative solutions to prevent another election".

On 2 November 2026, Herzog met with musician Boy George, thanking the musician for his support of Israel and referencing his song "We Will Dance Again". Also in attendance at the meeting were President of World Jewish Congress Israel Sylvan Adams and former hostage Elkana Bohbot.

On 5 November 2026, Herzog argued with lawmakers from Otzma Yehudit during post-election government-forming consultations at the President's Residence, rebuking Yitzhak Wasserlauf after he claimed that the election had been "stolen", with Herzog saying “You are citing hearsay; it is all speculation,” and that “In the legal world, things must be proven, and generalizations must be avoided. It is important to me that people exercise caution. Sometimes, definitive claims end up amounting to very little.” On the same day, Herzog also met with Board of Peace senior envoy Tony Blair.

On 7 November 2026, Herzog announced that, on the next day, he would select Gadi Eisenkot to attempt to form a governing coalition after the latter had received 67 recommendations from incoming members of the Knesset.

On 10 November 2026, Herzog attended the swearing-in of the 26th Knesset, at which he gave a speech calling for an investigation into October 7th security and intelligence failures, the strengthening of ties with the United States, and "joint responsibility for the duty of service" in regards to the conscription of the Haredi population. Speaking about racism in Israeli society, Herzog said “There is no place for bullying within it. There is no place for racism within it. Against anyone. And there is no place for violence, not in Arab society, not in the hills of Judea and Samaria, not in the streets of the cities, not in the schools, anywhere. And it must be eradicated with all its might.” He also told the lawmakers that they “must do everything possible to avoid a repeat election.”

== List of international trips ==
Country	Date(s)	Place	Details
Ukraine	5 October 2021	Kiev, Babi Yar	During his first official visit to Ukraine, which took place against the backdrop of the events marking the 80th anniversary of the Babi Yar massacre, President Herzog was received at the Mariinsky Presidential Palace in Kiev by President Volodymyr Zelensky. As part of the visit, Herzog participated in the inauguration ceremony of the Holocaust Remembrance Center in Kiev.
United Kingdom	21-22 November 2021	London, England	Meetings with HRH The Prince of Wales, Prime Minister Boris Johnson, Foreign Secretary Liz Truss, Members of Parliament, and Jewish community leaders. The President was a guest of honor at a special Genesis Prize Foundation event paying tribute to the late Rabbi Lord Jonathan Sacks one year after his passing.
United Arab Emirates	30–31 January 2022	Abu Dhabi, Dubai	The first-ever visit by an Israeli president to the Emirates, at the invitation of the President of the United Arab Emirates, Crown Prince Sheikh Mohammed bin Zayed. During the visit, Herzog held official meetings with President bin Zayed, Minister of Foreign Affairs and International Cooperation Abdullah bin Zayed, Prime Minister and Minister of Defense of the United Arab Emirates and Ruler of Dubai, Mohammed bin Rashid Al Maktoum, and with representatives of the Jewish community. During the visit, Herzog opened "Israel Day" at the Expo 2020 exhibition hosted in Dubai.
Greece	25 February 2022	Athens	State visit to Greece at the invitation of President Katerina Skalaropoulos. During his visit, Herzog participated in a wreath-laying ceremony at the Tomb of the Unknown Soldier, then arrived at the Presidential Palace where he met with the President of Greece. Herzog then held a meeting with Greek Prime Minister Kyriakos Mitsotakis. Later in the day, Herzog met with the President of the Greek Parliament, Konstantinos Tsoulas, and the opposition leader and former Prime Minister Alexis Tsipras. At the end of his visit, Herzog met with representatives of the Jewish community in Greece.
Cyprus	2 March 2022	Nicosia	State visit to Cyprus. During the visit, Herzog was received at a state reception at the Presidential Palace in Nicosia, where the national anthems were played, after which he held a private meeting with the President of Cyprus and an expanded bilateral meeting with the participation of the delegations, during which the presidents made statements. Herzog also attended a state luncheon at the invitation of the President of Cyprus.
Turkey	9–10 March 2022	Ankara, Istanbul	Visit at the invitation of Turkish President Recep Erdogan. The visit was part of the process of renewing relations between the two countries after a decade of tensions, during which Israel-Turkey relations were brought down. The state visit began when President Isaac Herzog laid a wreath at the tomb of the father of the Turkish nation, Mustafa Kemal Ataturk. From there, the president continued to the Presidential Palace in Ankara, where he was received in a state ceremony that included the playing of the national anthem Hatikvah – sounds that had not been heard in the Turkish capital for many years. In the background, 21 cannon salutes were fired and the entire palace was decorated with Israeli flags. Immediately after the reception, Herzog and Erdogan entered a closed-door meeting in the palace, and at the end of it the two made official statements to the media. Later in the evening, the Turkish president hosted Herzog and his entourage for a festive state dinner. At night, the president flew to Istanbul, and the next day he met with the Jewish community at the Neve Shalom synagogue, a place where two terrorist attacks had previously occurred. In the early evening, the president concluded his visit and returned to Israel.
Jordan	29 March 2022	Amman	A visit at the invitation of the King of Jordan, the visit was made in coordination with Prime Minister Naftali Bennett, the Minister of Foreign Affairs and their ministries. Herzog was received at the Al-Husseiniyah Palace of King Abdullah II. During the visit, Herzog and the King held a private meeting, followed by a bilateral meeting with the participation of advisors to the two leaders.
Germany	4 September 2022	Berlin	State visit; addressed the Bundestag, visited a Holocaust memorial.
United Kingdom	19-20 September 2022	London	Attended the funeral of Queen Elizabeth II.
United States of America	25 October 2022	Washington DC	President Isaac Herzog participated in an Atlantic Council event in Washington, D.C., marking two years since the Abraham Accords and joined former U.S. Ambassador to Israel Daniel Shapiro in conversation.
Egypt	7 November 2022	Sharm El Sheikh	In November 2022, an Israeli delegation participated in the United Nations Climate Conference (COP27) held in Sharm el-Sheikh, Egypt, headed by President Isaac Herzog. Upon his arrival at the conference, the president was received by Egyptian President Abdel Fattah al-Sisi and UN Secretary-General Antonio Guterres. During the conference, the President held a series of policy meetings, including meetings with the President of the United Arab Emirates, Mohammed bin Zayed, the Prime Minister of Norway, Jonas Geir Sture, the Prime Minister of the United Kingdom, Rishi Sunak, and the King of Jordan, Abdullah II. Herzog also met with Colombian President Gustavo Petro and Microsoft President Brad Smith. During the first day of the conference, the President participated in the official opening event and in the afternoon inaugurated the Israeli pavilion, which was established for the first time within the framework of international climate conferences. At the culmination of the conference, President Herzog addressed the central plenary of the gathering.
Bahrain	4-5 December 2022	Manama	First-ever visit by an Israeli President; met with King Hamad and Crown Prince Salman bin Hamad Al Khalifa. This came following the normalization of ties under the 2020 Abraham Accords. He was welcomed with a state ceremony at Al-Qudaibiya Palace in Manam, participated in a business event with the Bahrain Economic Development Board to promote bilateral trade, technology sharing, and solar/desalination cooperation and he met with leaders and members of Bahrain's small local Jewish community.
Belgium	25-26 January 2023	Brussels	Meeting at the Royal Palace of Brussels, where he was received by His Majesty King Philippe of Belgium. Gave a speech at International Holocaust Remembrance Day session of the European Parliament.
Poland	19 April 2023	Warsaw	Traveled to Warsaw, Poland, to join Polish President Andrzej Duda and German President Frank-Walter Steinmeier for the official 80th-anniversary commemoration of the Warsaw Ghetto Uprising, spoke at the Monument to the Ghetto Heroes, met with Polish President Andrzej Duda at the Presidential Palace. He visited Warsaw's Nożyk Synagogue with his German and Polish counterparts. Visited Mila 18, the underground bunker used by uprising leader Mordechai Anielewicz.
United Kingdom	4-6 May 2023	London	Attended the King’s Coronation.
Azerbaijan	30-31 May 2023	Baku	Made a historic official state visit to Baku, meeting with Azerbaijani President Ilham Aliyev. He participated in a special event in Baku marking the 75th anniversary of Israel's independence and highlighted the strong bridge provided by Azerbaijan's historic Jewish community.
United States of America	18 July 2023	Washington DC	Diplomatic visit to the United States to mark 75 years of Israel's independence. During the visit, he met with US President Joe Biden at the White House, and the next day he spoke before both houses of Congress. In his speech, he discussed the nature and importance of relations between the countries, the threat of the Iranian nuclear program, the Abraham Accords, and the issue of missing Israelis held in the Gaza Strip.
Slovakia	4-5 September 2023	Bratislava	Herzog met with Slovak President Zuzana Čaputová and Prime Minister Ľudovít Ódor. He was received with a full military guard of honor by Čaputová at the Grassalkovich Palace. He visited the historic grave of Rabbi Moses Schreiber (the Chatam Sofer) and met with local Jewish community leaders in Bratislava.
Austria	5 September 2023	Vienna	Herzog met with Austria’s President Alexander Van der Bellen in a state ceremony at the Hofburg Palace as well as Chancellor of Austria Karl Nehammer. He also met with the European Jewish Congress.
United Arab Emirates	1 December 2023	Dubai	Herzog attended the COP28 climate summit in Dubai, United Arab Emirates, where he met with UAE President Sheikh Mohammed bin Zayed Al Nahyan and had a handshake with Qatar's Tamim bin Hamad Al Thani.
Switzerland	17-18 January 2024	Davos	Herzog attended the World Economic Forum accompanied by families of Israeli hostages. He participated in high-level corporate interactions, including a prominent side-event organized by Palantir Technologies. This private gathering gathered major tech CEOs—such as Andy Jassy (Amazon), Marc Benioff (Salesforce), and Michael Dell (Dell)—specifically to listen to testimonies from released captives and families of hostages.
Germany	16-17 February 2024	Munich	Herzog attended the Munich Security Conference. He met with world leaders, including German President Frank-Walter Steinmeier and Azerbaijani President Ilham Aliyev, alongside discussions with U.S. Secretary of State Antony Blinken.
Netherlands	10 March 2024	Amsterdam	Attended the opening ceremony of the National Holocaust Museum in Amsterdam presided over by the Dutch king and himself. It was also attended by other international dignitaries, and family members of hostages held in Gaza.
Rwanda	7 April 2024	Kigali	He held diplomatic meetings with international leaders and attended the ceremony marking 30 years since the genocide in Rwanda. He was the first high-ranking Israeli leader to visit Africa following the outbreak of the Gaza war on October 7, 2023. He met with Rwandan President Paul Kagame and presented him with a hostage dog-tag necklace.
Italy	25 July 2024	Rome	During his visit to Italy, President Herzog was received by the Israeli Ambassador to Italy, Alon Bar, and by the Republic's Chief of Diplomatic Ceremonies, Bruno Antonio Pasquino. During his stay, he met with Italian President Sergio Mattarella at the Quirinale Palace, and later was received at the Chigi Palace for a meeting with Prime Minister Giorgia Meloni.
France	24-26 July 2024	Paris	He attended the 2024 Olympic Games opening ceremony on the Seine River; meeting with President Macron at the Élysée Palace, and attended the formal events and the surrounding high-level diplomatic receptions held on that day of Olympic Games.
Serbia	11-12 September 2024	Belgrade	Herzog met with Serbian President Aleksandar Vučić and accompanied by Alon Ohel’s family. Herzog then met with Prime Minister Miloš Vučević, and Parliament Speaker Ana Brnabić. Vučić and Herzog announced plans to fast-track and conclude a bilateral free trade agreement to boost joint economic work in high-tech, artificial intelligence, and agriculture. Herzog also met with members of Belgrade's local Jewish community and took part in a remembrance event located at the Jewish Cemetery in Belgrade.
United States of America	10-12 November 2024	Washington DC	Herzog met with President Biden in the White House; He headlined the General Assembly of the Jewish Federations of North America, thanking American Jewish communities for their solidarity and he was honored with the Scholar-Statesman Award by The Washington Institute for Near East Policy for leadership and contributions to regional policy in NYC.
Cyprus	9 January 2025	Nicosia	Herzog met with Cypriot President Nikos Christodoulides at the Presidential Palace. They discussed regional security, international developments, and the situation in Syria.
Switzerland	20-21 January 2025	Davos	Herzog attended the World Economic Forum where he was interviewed on stage by CNN anchor Fareed Zakaria. He held a series of bilateral meetings with global figures—including President Volodymyr Zelensky of Ukraine, President Ilham Aliyev of Azerbaijan, and international agency heads—stressing cooperative defense against Iranian proxies and the importance of returning captives.
United States of America	26-27 January 2025	New York	Herzog addressed the UN General Assembly Address on International Holocaust Remembrance Day. He visited the Ohel of the Lubavitcher Rebbe; he spoke at a special UN session commemorating the 80th anniversary of the liberation of Auschwitz. In his speech, he criticized the UN, the International Court of Justice, and the International Criminal Court for ""moral bankruptcy"" and hypocrisy regarding their treatment of Israel".
Italy	19 February 2025	Rome	Herzog met with Italian Prime Minister Giorgia Meloni and President Sergio Mattarella to discuss freeing hostages in Gaza, countering Iran, and fighting antisemitism. He finished his trip with a speech to Rome's local Jewish community at the Great Synagogue of Rome.
Hungary	17 February 2025	Budapest	The visit began with a state reception ceremony at Heroes' Square, where the President was received by the President of Hungary, Tamás Solyuk, and the two reviewed the guard of honor. During the visit, the two met with the family of the abductee Omri Miran and with Holocaust survivor Aharon Shevo and his family. Later, President Herzog met with the Prime Minister of Hungary, Viktor Orbán. As part of the memorial events during the visit, the President participated in an official ceremony at the "Shoes on the Danube" memorial, which commemorates the Hungarian Jews who were murdered by the Arrow Cross. A meeting was held there with representatives of the local Jewish community, and in the evening the President participated in a state dinner.
Poland	24 April 2025	Auschwitz	On 80th Anniversary of liberation, Herzog led the March of the Living in Poland.
Germany	May 11-13,2025	Berlin	Marking 60 years of diplomatic relations, Herzog met the President of Germany, the Chancellor of Germany, the President of the Bundestag, and other senior government officials. Attended a state event at the Presidential Palace. Joint meeting with more than 100 Israeli and German youth to discuss shared history and future.
Vatican City	18 May 2025	Vatican City	Visit to participate in the coronation of Pope Leo XIV. On the sidelines of the coronation of Pope Leo XIV, Herzog met with, among others, US Vice President J.D. Vance, Ukrainian President Volodymyr Zelensky, Dutch President Dick Chepstow, his Italian counterpart, President Sergio Mattarella, Spanish King Felipe VI, and European Commission President Ursula von der Leyen. Herzog arrived at the coronation with a sticker on his suit indicating the 590 days the hostages had been held captive – since the 7 October massacre.
France	18 May 2025	Paris	Herzog took off from Rome to Paris for an unplanned visit. During the visit, Herzog met with French President Emmanuel Macron at the Elysee Palace and discussed the issue of the hostages. The meeting took place hours after the president represented Israel at the papal coronation ceremony, and after his meeting with Macron, he returned to Israel.
Lithuania LatviaEstonia	4-6 August 2025	Vilnius, Riga, Tallinn	Herzog met with President Gitanas Nausėda of Lithuania, President Edgars Rinkēvičs of Latvia, and President Alar Karis of Estonia. This was an official diplomatic tour of the Baltic states to build international support, expand bilateral trade, and address European security. He traveled alongside a high-level delegation from the Israel Innovation Authority, Israel Export Institute, and Manufacturers Association to foster partnerships in AI, defense, and green tech. He visited major Holocaust memorial sites, met with local Jewish communities, and emphasized joint efforts to combat antisemitism. In Vilnius, he participated in a bilateral business forum, and visited the local Jewish community at the Vilnius Choral Synagogue; In Riga, he was welcomed at Riga Castle by President Edgars Rinkēvičs, laid a wreath at the Freedom Monument, visited the Museum of the Occupation, and attended a state dinner; and in Tallinn he laid a wreath at the Memorial to the Victims of Communism, and held working meetings with Prime Minister Kristen Michal.
Vatican City	4 September 2025	Vatican City	Herzog met with Pope Leo XIV at the Apostolic Palace. He also met Vatican Secretary of State Cardinal Pietro Parolin. The talks focused on Middle East conflicts, the humanitarian crisis and war in Gaza, the release of hostages, and the push for a permanent ceasefire and a two-state solution.
United Kingdom	11 September 2025	London	During an official presidential visit to London, President Herzog met with British Prime Minister Keir Starmer at his official residence at 10 Downing Street. The Prime Minister greeted the President at the front of the building, after which the two held a private meeting and a bilateral meeting with the participation of the Israeli Ambassador to the United Kingdom, Tzipi Hotovely. Later in the visit, the President met with the Leader of the Opposition, Kemi Badenoch, and delivered a speech to senior political figures and opinion leaders at Chatham House, the Royal Institute of International Affairs.
Democratic Republic of the Congo	9 November 2025	Kinshasa	Herzog's first presidential visit to Africa lasted a few hours. During this visit, Herzog was received by Congolese President Felix Tshisekedi. The visit began with a state ceremony held at the presidential palace, after which the two held a diplomatic meeting.
Zambia	9 November 2025	Lusaka	Official visit to Zambia, becoming the first Israeli president to visit the country. Upon landing in Lusaka, the President was received by Zambian President Hakainde Hichilema in a state welcome ceremony held at the airport. The visit was part of an effort to strengthen diplomatic relations between Israel and African countries, and in light of the reopening of the Israeli embassy in Zambia.
United States of America	7 December 2025	New York	Herzog received an Honorary Doctorate from Yeshiva University and was the keynote speaker at Yeshiva University's 101st Annual Hanukkah Dinner in New York. He noted that his late father, Israeli President Chaim Herzog, received an honorary degree from YU in 1976, and his grandfather was the first Chief Rabbi of Israel, Yitzhak HaLevi Herzog.
Switzerland	20-22 January 2026	Davos	Herzog attended the World Economic Forum where once again he was interviewed by Fareed Zakaria. In the interview, Herzog addressed regional security, criticized global critics of Israel's self-defense, and questioned selective international activism regarding human rights in the Middle East. He met with Nvidia CEO Jensen Huang to discuss high-tech investments, a new campus planned for northern Israel, and the safe return of a former hostage and employee. He held talks with Azerbaijan President Ilham Aliyev, Swiss leaders, NATO Secretary-General Mark Rutte, Finnish President Alexander Stubb, and former UK Prime Minister Tony Blair.
Australia	February 8-12,2026	Sydney, Canberra, Melbourne	A state visit conducted at the invitation of the Governor-General, the Prime Minister of Australia and the Jewish community, following the murderous massacre that occurred in December 2025 during a Hanukkah event on Bondi Beach in Sydney in which 15 people were murdered. Herzog paid a visit to the site of the terrorist attack on Bondi Beach. During the visit, he met with the families of the victims and survivors of the attack and held a memorial ceremony, in which the President laid a wreath on behalf of the State of Israel and made a statement to the media. The ceremony was attended by New South Wales Premier Chris Minns, Waverley Council Leader Will Namish, Jewish Agency Chairman Doron Almog, World Zionist Organization Chairman Yaakov Hagoel and leaders of the Jewish community in Australia. Following the visit, Herzog arrived at the Moriah School in Sydney, where he held a meeting with local high school students. In their conversation, they discussed the issues of anti-Semitism in Australia, the implications of the attack on Bondi Beach, and relations between Israel and Australia. In his remarks, the President emphasized the importance of Jewish identity and the connection of Diaspora Jewry to the State of Israel.
Ethiopia	25 February 2026	Addis Ababa	Herzog made a state presidential visit to Ethiopia. Upon his landing, Herzog was received by Ethiopian Foreign Minister Dr. Gideon Timothy and Israeli Ambassador to Ethiopia Dr. Avraham Negusa in a state reception ceremony held at the airport. After Herzog was received by Ethiopian President Tiye Atsek-Selasas in a state ceremony held by the Honor Guard at the Presidential Palace, during which the national anthems of both countries were played, after which the president reviewed the Honor Guard. He then met with the Prime Minister of Ethiopia and Nobel Peace Prize laureate, Dr. Abiy Ahmed, and with the leadership of the local Jewish community. Later, Herzog visited the Presidential Palace Museum, where he was presented with unique items from Ethiopia's royal heritage, and at the end, he signed the Presidential Palace's guest book. After that, a diplomatic meeting was held between the two, during which they discussed strengthening the historic ties of friendship between the peoples and deepening cooperation between the two countries.
Kazakhstan	27 April 2026	Astana	In light of Kazakhstan's accession to the Abraham Accords in November 2025, President Yitzhak Herzog paid a state visit to the country in April 2026.The visit began on 27 April in the capital Astana, where the President was received by the President of Kazakhstan, Kassym-Jomart Tokayev, in an official ceremony at the Presidential Palace (Aqorda). The ceremony included the playing of the national anthems of both countries and a review of the guard of honor. During the visit, the leaders held a one-on-one meeting, followed by an expanded bilateral meeting with the participation of the Kazakh diplomatic corps and senior government officials. The discussions focused on deepening diplomatic relations and accelerating strategic cooperation between the countries in a variety of areas. President Herzog expressed his appreciation for the Kazakh government and welcomed the political turning point that occurred in November 2025, with Kazakhstan's announcement of its accession to the "Abraham Accords" and the "Peace Council" chaired by the United States. A delegation of senior figures in the Israeli high-tech and artificial intelligence industries also participated in the visit.
Panama	6–7 May 2026	Panama City	Herzog, along with his wife Michal Herzog, made the first official and historic visit by the President of the State of Israel to Panama. Upon landing, they were received by the local Foreign Minister, Javier Martínez-Ache Vázquez, and later took a tour of the Panama Canal. The visit continued at the Presidential Palace, where the President and his wife were received by the President of Panama, José Raúl Molino, in an official welcoming ceremony that included a review of an honor guard. After the ceremony, the Presidents held a diplomatic meeting and an expanded bilateral meeting with the participation of the government teams. In their talks, the leaders discussed deepening relations and promoting strategic cooperation in the areas of security, health, tourism and trade, following earlier conclusions reached between the two at the World Economic Forum in Davos. At the end of the meetings, the presidents issued statements to the media. As part of the visit, President Herzog also met with the heads and members of the local Jewish community.
Costa Rica	8–9 May 2026	San Jose	During his visit to Costa Rica, President Herzog represented the State of Israel at the inauguration ceremony of the incoming president. After the ceremony, he held a diplomatic meeting with President Laura Fernandez Delgado. He also participated in a gala dinner for heads of state hosted by the outgoing president of Costa Rica. As part of the events, the president held a series of policy meetings with presidents and leaders from Central America, South America, and around the world. In addition, the president met with leaders and members of the Jewish community in Costa Rica.
Romania	28–29 June 2026	Iasi, Bucharest	To mark 85 years since the Iași pogrom, Herzog made the first trip by an Israeli President to Romania. He went to the Jewish Cemetery in Romania, participating in a solemn reburial ceremony for 22 newly identified victims of the 1941 pogrom. He continued to Bucharest where he met with Romanian President Nicușor Dan at Cotroceni Palace for diplomatic and bilateral discussions. He then delivered a historic address to the joint plenary of the Romanian Parliament at the Palace of the Parliament in Bucharest, the first time an Israeli president addressed a joint session of the Romanian Parliament. He toured the Holocaust Museum in Iași and unveiled a new memorial plaque. He went to The Square of the Massacre with the museum itself located at Chestura Square. He attended the 12th edition of the March of Life in Iași, a community-led walk organized to stand against extremism and honor Holocaust victims and held a dedicated assembly in Bucharest to meet directly with the leaders and members of Romania’s Jewish community.

== Awards ==
In March 2022, Cypriot President Nicos Anastasiades awarded Herzog Cyprus’s highest honor, the Grand Collar of the Order of Makarios III, as a token of the friendship between Cyprus and Israel.

In November 2025, Yeshiva University awarded him an honorary doctorate in recognition of his leadership, moral courage, and lifelong commitment to the Jewish people.

In 2026, Herzog received an honorary doctorate from JTS, also giving the commencement address.

== Israeli Presidential Medal of Honour ==
Shimon Peres created the President's Medal which is the highest civilian medal given by the President of the State of Israel. This was discontinued under Reuben Rivlin but in 2022, Herzog revived it and renamed it the Israeli Presidential Medal of Honour. President Joe Biden was one of the first recipients of the new medal. Other awardees include Nicos Anastasiades, President of Cyprus; Frank Lowy, Mark Leibler and Donald Trump. On 13 April 2026, it was announced that Herzog would award President of Argentina Javier Milei with the Presidential Medal of Honor, with the announcement of Herzog's office describing the award for Milei as "recognition of his consistent and outspoken commitment to Israel since assuming office in 2023".
