= ZBM =

ZBM may refer to:

- Roland-Désourdy Airport in Quebec, Canada, IATA code ZBM
- ZBM-TV, a television station in Hamilton, Bermuda
