= Sylvan Adams =

Canadian-Israeli business person

- סילבן אדמס
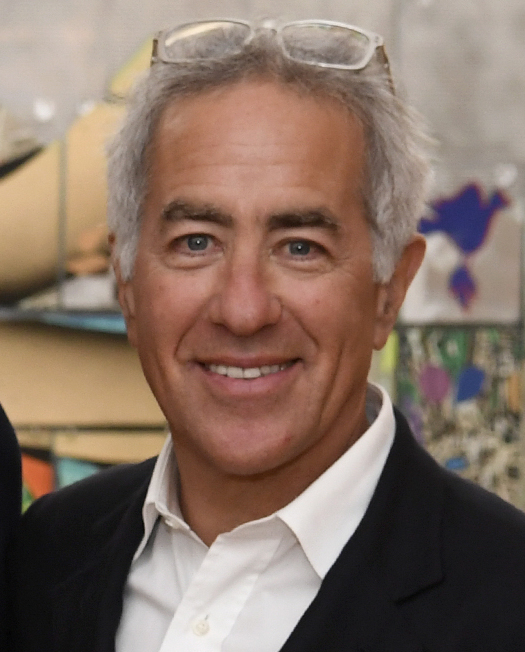
- Born: November 1, 1958 (age 67); Quebec City, Canada
- Occupation: businessman
- Known for: Bringing 2018 Giro d'Italia to Israel
- Parent(s): Marcel Adams, Annie Adams
- Family: Gil Troy (brother-in-law)

Sylvan Adams (Hebrew: סילבן אדמס; born November 1, 1958) is an Israeli-Canadian billionaire businessman.

== Background and career ==
Adams was born and raised in Quebec City, Canada. He served for close to 25 years as president and CEO of Iberville Developments, one of Canada's largest real-estate development companies, founded by his father Marcel. At the end of 2015, he immigrated to Israel and settled in Tel Aviv.

In 2025, Adams was appointed President of the World Jewish Congress Israel.

== Philanthropy ==
He donates money for many sports and educational activities. He established the Margaret and Sylvan Adams Family Foundation to support educational and medical projects in Israel and Canada. The foundation offers doctoral scholarships at the Israel Academy of Sciences and Humanities. The "Bonei Zion Prize" is given every year with his name by Nefesh b'Nefesh. The award recognizes immigrants to Israel from English-speaking countries who have impacted Israel in the fields of science and medicine, education and nonprofit work, national service, business, technology and culture, and arts and sports. It was established in 2013 with Adams assistance and offers each recipient with a $10,000 prize.

In 2018, he donated $5 million to SpaceIL, the non-profit organization that is working to land the first Israeli spacecraft on the Moon. In 2019, Adams was reported to be funding the cost of a performance by Madonna at the 2019 Eurovision Song Contest.

In 2019, he donated 100 million NIS for a new emergency medicine wing at the Ichilov Medical Center in Tel Aviv. He also donated money for a new children's hospital at the Wolfson Medical Center in Holon.

In 2023, he was chosen to light a torch at the beacon lighting ceremony on Mount Herzl on the occasion of the 75th year of the State of Israel.

In 2024, he donated $100 million to Ben Gurion University to help rebuild the Southern Cities of Israel after the Oct 7th Hamas-led attack of Israel by Hamas.

In 2025, he donated $100 million to Soroka Medical Center to help rebuild the hospital that had been damaged by Iranian missiles in the summer of 2025. Also in 2025, Adams was included in TIME Magazine’s TIME100 Philanthropy list in recognition of his major contributions to Israel and the global Jewish community.

== Cycling ==
Adams has a passion for cycling, taking it up in his 40s. In November 2017, he won the World Masters Championship in Manchester, England and has been a Masters Category C world time-trial champion many times. He is co-owner of the Israel Cycling Academy (ICA). The team was founded in 2015 as a UCI Pro Continental team and made the jump up to UCI World Tour level in 2020. The team is known as Israel–Premier Tech.

In 2017 the first institute for sport's excellency in Israel was established in Tel Aviv University and is called the Sylvan Adams Cycling Network. He also donated money along with KKL-JNF Canada and others for the Sylvan Adams Commuter Path, a biking path which connects Tel Aviv with surrounding areas to allow people to commute to work by bicycle more quickly and safely.

In May 2018, he established the first indoor velodrome in Israel and the Middle East. He also donated $2m for the redevelopment of the Bromont Velodrome in Quebec.

He was the first to suggest the 2018 Giro d'Italia start in Israel and donated 80 million NIS for this purpose. This was the first time that any stage of the Giro tour took place outside of Europe. He was named the Honorary President of the 2018 Giro d'Italia as a result.

During the 2025 season and especially during the Vuelta a España, the team became the subject of pro-Palestinian protests, due to the ongoing war in Gaza. Demonstrators targeted the team at several stages, leading organizers to increase security. In response, the team temporarily removed the word "Israel" from their jerseys in an effort to prioritize rider safety and reduce tensions with protesters. In October 2025, following increasing pressure and ultimatums from sponsors, Adams announced he would step back from day-to-day involvement with the team and would no longer speak on its behalf, while the team announced it would undergo a complete rebrand, dropping its Israeli identity and changing its name.

== Family ==
His father was Marcel Adams (1920-2020), a Canadian real estate investor, philanthropist and Holocaust survivor.
