= Bromont =

- City
- Ville de Bromont
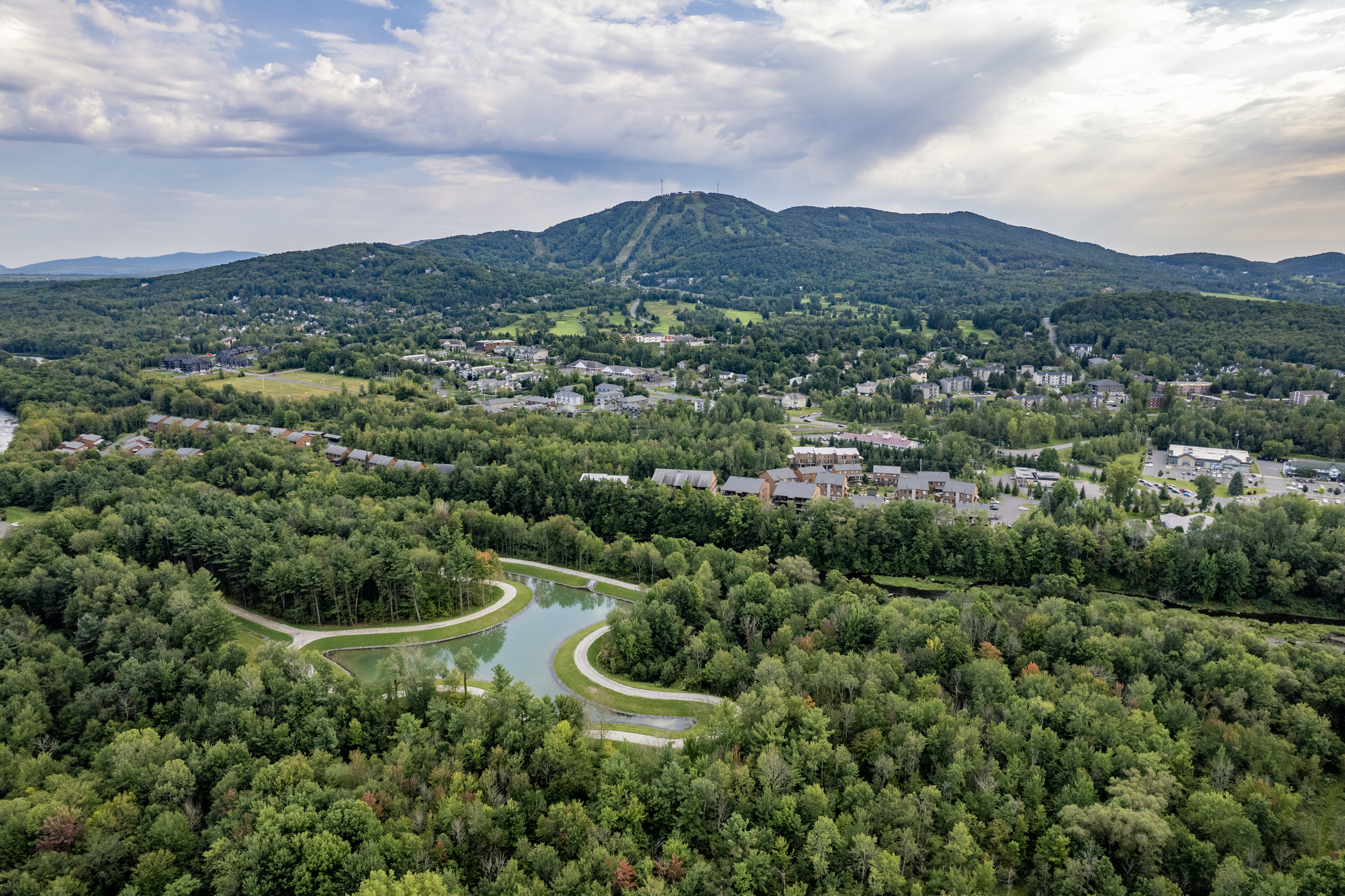
- Aerial view of Bromont

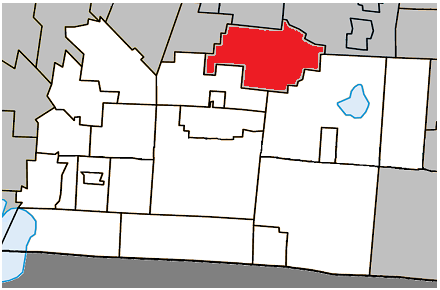
- Location within Brome-Missisquoi RCM

- Location in southern Quebec
- Coordinates: 45°19′N 72°39′W
- Country: Canada
- Province: Quebec
- Region: Estrie
- RCM: Brome-Missisquoi
- Founded: June 18, 1964
- Merged with West Shefford: 1966
- Constituted: January 27, 1973

Government
  - Mayor: Michelle Champagne
  - Federal riding: Brome—Missisquoi
  - Prov. riding: Brome-Missisquoi

Area
  - Total: 116.10 km^{2} (44.83 sq mi)
  - Land: 114.05 km^{2} (44.03 sq mi)
- Elevation: 139 m (456 ft)

Population (2021)
  - Total: 11,357
  - Density: 99.6/km^{2} (258/sq mi)
  - Pop. 2016–2021: ▲25.6%
  - Dwellings: 6,249
- Time zone: UTC−05:00 (EST)
  - Summer (DST): UTC−04:00 (EDT)
- Postal code: J2L
- Area codes: 450, 579 and 354
- Highways: A-10; R-139; R-241
- Website: www.bromont.net

Bromont (French pronunciation: [bʁɔmɔ̃]) is a city in the Brome-Missisquoi Regional County Municipality in the Estrie region of southern Quebec, Canada. It lies at the foot of Mont Brome, one of the Monteregian Hills, between Granby and Cowansville. Bromont had a population of 11,357 in the 2021 Canadian census.

The present city grew from a planned community established in 1964 by brothers Roland and Germain Désourdy and from the older settlements of West Shefford and Adamsville. West Shefford was merged with Bromont in 1966, while the village municipality of Adamsville was annexed in 1973. The new city was planned around two principal areas of development: recreation and tourism around Mont Brome, and a high-technology industrial sector.

Bromont later became a centre for alpine skiing, cycling and equestrian sport. Its Olympic Equestrian Centre hosted most of the equestrian competitions at the 1976 Summer Olympics, as well as the riding portion of the modern pentathlon. The city's industrial area developed around firms in microelectronics and advanced manufacturing, including IBM, Teledyne DALSA and GE Aerospace, and is also home to the Université de Sherbrooke's MiQro Innovation Collaborative Centre.

== History ==
=== Early settlement and West Shefford ===
European settlement in the area began during the closing years of the 18th century. John Savage, an Irish-born Loyalist who had lived in New York before the American Revolution, settled in what became Shefford Township in 1793.

The settlement that developed around Savage's land became known as West Shefford. The name was taken from the local post office, established in 1843, and ultimately from Shefford Township. The township name itself was derived from Shefford in Bedfordshire, England. West Shefford was constituted as a village municipality in 1888.

Agriculture was initially the main economic activity in the surrounding countryside, although manufacturing developed during the 19th century. Municipal historical material identifies potash production and the dairy industry among the activities associated with West Shefford's early economy.

Rail service was established through West Shefford during the 19th century. A May 1869 timetable for the Stanstead, Shefford and Chambly Railroad lists West Shefford as a station on the line between Waterloo and St. Johns. Railway connections later formed part of the industrial development of the village and surrounding area.

The old centre of West Shefford survives along present-day Shefford Street and forms what Bromont now calls the Vieux-Village.

=== Adamsville ===
A second settlement developed farther west in the Township of Farnham. It became known as Adamsville after George Adams (1813–1885), a merchant from Vermont whose family had settled in the Saint-Armand area in 1816. Adams moved to the Farnham township area and became a merchant and mill owner there during the 1840s.

By the second half of the 19th century, Adamsville had developed around lumber, milling, tanning and agriculture. A Catholic parish was established in the 1870s as the French-speaking population of the district increased. The village municipality of Adamsville was constituted in 1923.

The present Saint-Vincent-Ferrier church was built in 1932–1933. Earlier churches serving the parish had been damaged or destroyed by fires in 1916 and 1931.

=== Creation of Bromont ===
Bromont was founded on June 18, 1964, through a private act of the Quebec legislature. The project was promoted by businessmen Roland and Germain Désourdy. Germain Désourdy became the city's first mayor, while Roland Désourdy was closely involved in the development of its recreational and industrial projects.

The project differed from the older villages around it. Bromont was conceived as a planned community combining residential development, recreation and high-technology industry. Municipal planning documents describe the residential component as being influenced by the garden-city model.

Development of the ski area on Mont Brome began at the same time as the city. The first ski runs opened in 1964. Two years later, Bromont and the village municipality of West Shefford were merged.

The territory continued to expand during the following decade. Between 1964 and 1974, Bromont underwent two municipal mergers and twelve annexations. The village municipality of Adamsville was annexed in 1973.

Autoroute 10, linking Montreal and Sherbrooke, was constructed through the area during the city's early development. Bromont's regional airport opened in 1968 beside land reserved for industrial development.

Industrial development followed. IBM established a manufacturing operation at Bromont, with its plant opening in 1972. Other manufacturers later established facilities in the area, including General Electric and DALSA.

=== Olympic development ===
Bromont's equestrian facilities became part of the preparations for the 1976 Summer Olympics in Montreal. Roland Désourdy proposed Bromont as the location for the equestrian competitions, and the site was approved in 1974.

The Olympic Equestrian Centre hosted dressage, eventing and individual jumping during the 1976 Games. The team jumping final was held at Montreal's Olympic Stadium. The riding portion of the modern pentathlon was also held at Bromont.

The site remained in use after the Olympics and became the venue for International Bromont and other equestrian competitions.

Bromont was selected in 2014 to host the 2018 FEI World Equestrian Games, but the organizing committee withdrew in 2016 after it was unable to secure the required financing.

== Toponymy ==
The name Bromont was adopted when the new city was created in 1964. The Commission de toponymie du Québec traces the name to Mont Brome, around which much of the original recreational development was planned. The change from West Shefford to Bromont was associated with the creation of the new resort community.

The older name West Shefford came from a post office established in 1843. It referred to Shefford Township, whose name was itself taken from Shefford in Bedfordshire, England.

The name Adamsville remains in local use for the western part of Bromont. It commemorates George Adams, an early merchant and mill owner in the area.

The demonyms Bromontois and Bromontoise were officially recognized by the Commission de toponymie in 1986.

== Geography ==
Bromont covers 114.05 km^{2} (44.03 sq mi) of land in the northern part of the Brome-Missisquoi Regional County Municipality. It lies southeast of Granby, with Shefford to the northeast, Lac-Brome to the southeast, Brigham to the southwest and Saint-Alphonse-de-Granby to the west.

The central physical feature of the city is Mont Brome, which reaches an elevation of 553 m (1,814 ft). The mountain is part of the Monteregian Hills, a group of isolated hills extending eastward from the Montreal area.

Mont Gale lies southwest of Mont Brome. Other named elevations are found around the Brome massif, including Mont Soleil and Mont Bernard. Residential and recreational development occupies portions of the mountain slopes, while agricultural and forested land remains in the lower-lying parts of the municipality.

The Yamaska River crosses the municipal territory. Lac Bromont lies south of Mont Brome and is approximately 1.1 km (0.68 mi) long. It drains toward the Yamaska River through Beaver Meadow Brook. The lake was formerly known as Brome Pond and Lac Tétreault; the present name was adopted in 1971 to avoid confusion with nearby Brome Lake. The smaller Lac Gale lies to the west.

The city identifies six principal neighbourhoods or districts: Adamsville, Lac-Bromont, Mont-Brome, Mont-Soleil, Pierre-Laporte and Shefford.

=== Conservation ===
The Réserve naturelle du Lac-Gale protects 104 ha (260 acres) near Lac Gale, approximately 6 km (3.7 mi) south of Bromont's centre. The reserve was established to protect natural areas within the municipality.

The protected area forms part of the Domaine naturel du lac Gale, a municipal conservation area containing forest and recreational trails.

== Demographics ==
Historical population

Year	Pop.	±%
1966	110	—
1971	1,961	+1682.7%
1976	2,505	+27.7%
1981	2,733	+9.1%
1986	2,838	+3.8%
1991	3,408	+20.1%

Year	Pop.	±%
1996	4,290	+25.9%
2001	4,808	+12.1%
2006	6,049	+25.8%
2011	7,649	+26.5%
2016	9,041	+18.2%
2021	11,357	+25.6%

Source: Statistics Canada censuses

In the 2021 Census of Population, Bromont had a population of 11,357 living in 5,062 of its 6,249 private dwellings, an increase of 25.6% from its 2016 population of 9,041. With a land area of 114.05 km^{2} (44.03 sq mi), it had a population density of 99.6/km^{2} (257.9/sq mi).

The median age was 47.6 years in 2021, compared with 44.2 in 2016.

=== Language ===
In 2021, 10,160 residents reported French as their sole mother tongue, representing 90.2% of respondents. English was the sole mother tongue of 600 residents, or 5.3%, while 165 reported both English and French and 285 reported another mother tongue.

Mother tongue, 2021
Language	Population	%
French	10,160	90.2
English	600	5.3
English and French	165	1.5
Other	285	2.5

== Economy ==
Bromont was planned from its creation around two economic sectors: recreation and tourism, and high-technology industry. Both remain important parts of the city's economy.

=== Technology and manufacturing ===
The Bromont Scientific Park developed around the regional airport beginning in the late 1960s. IBM's Bromont plant opened in 1972 and became one of the principal industrial facilities in the city. The facility specializes in semiconductor assembly, packaging and testing.

Other technology and manufacturing firms established operations in Bromont, including Teledyne DALSA and GE Aviation. Bromont has consequently developed a concentration of activity in microelectronics, semiconductors and advanced manufacturing.

The MiQro Innovation Collaborative Centre (C2MI) is located in the scientific park. Created through a partnership involving the Université de Sherbrooke, IBM Canada and Teledyne DALSA, the centre provides clean rooms, laboratories and equipment for research and commercialization in microelectronics and electronic systems.

The Quebec government designated the Bromont area as an innovation zone in digital technologies and intelligent electronic systems in 2022.

=== Hyundai plant ===
Hyundai Auto Canada established an automobile assembly plant in Bromont in the late 1980s. The 150,000 m^{2} (1,600,000 sq ft) plant occupied an 850,000 m^{2} (210 acres) site and included body, paint and final assembly facilities. Construction represented an investment of approximately $387.7 million, including about $131 million in federal and provincial assistance.

The plant was intended to assemble the Hyundai Sonata. Hyundai and Chrysler discussed an agreement under which Chrysler would sell a rebadged version of the Bromont-built Sonata, but the proposed arrangement was abandoned in 1990.

The plant closed in 1994 after only a few years of production. The property was later divided for other industrial uses.

=== Tourism ===
Recreational development began with the establishment of the ski area on Mont Brome in 1964. The mountain subsequently developed into a year-round resort offering alpine skiing, cycling and a water park.

Golf and equestrian sport also became established in the area during Bromont's early development. The city's Olympic Equestrian Centre remains in use for national and international competitions.

== Sport ==
Bromont has hosted competitions in skiing, cycling and equestrian sport since the 1960s.

The Olympic Equestrian Centre was built for the 1976 Summer Olympics. All of the Olympic equestrian competitions except the team jumping final were held in Bromont, together with the riding portion of the modern pentathlon. The venue continued to operate after the Games and became the site of recurring international equestrian competitions.

Bromont has also hosted international alpine and freestyle skiing competitions and mountain-bike events. The city hosted the mountain-bike world championships in 1994 and later rounds of the UCI Mountain Bike World Cup.

The original Bromont Velodrome opened in 2001 using a wooden track acquired following the 1996 Summer Olympics in Atlanta. The outdoor track closed in 2020. It was replaced by the indoor Vélodrome Sylvan Adams, which opened in September 2022.

== Culture and heritage ==
Bromont retains built heritage from both West Shefford and Adamsville. The city has established heritage interpretation routes through the former village centres. The Vieux-Bromont route contains twenty interpretive panels and three murals, while the Adamsville route contains seven panels dealing with the history of the former village.

Among the surviving religious buildings is the former St. John's Anglican Church on Shefford Street, built during the 1880s. The Gothic Revival building reflects the historically anglophone Protestant population of West Shefford and now serves as the Centre culturel St-John.

The Catholic Church of Saint-François-Xavier was constructed in 1889–1891 to designs by architect Louis-Zéphirin Gauthier. Its architecture combines elements associated with the Gothic Revival and Neoclassical traditions.

The Adamsville area contains the Church of Saint-Vincent-Ferrier, reconstructed in 1932–1933 following a fire that damaged its predecessor.

heritage buildings
Building	Date	Area	Notes
Former St. John's Anglican Church	1880s	West Shefford	Gothic Revival church; now the Centre culturel St-John
Church of Saint-François-Xavier	1889–1891	West Shefford	Designed by Louis-Zéphirin Gauthier
Church of Saint-Vincent-Ferrier	1932–1933	Adamsville	Rebuilt following the 1931 fire

== Transportation ==
Autoroute 10 crosses the northern part of Bromont and connects the city with Montreal to the west and Sherbrooke to the east. Bromont is served by interchanges 74 and 78. Route 139 provides a north–south connection through the city toward Granby and Cowansville, while Route 241 links Bromont with Shefford and Waterloo.

=== Rail ===
West Shefford was served by railway during the 19th century. An 1869 timetable of the Stanstead, Shefford and Chambly Railway lists a West Shefford station between Waterloo and Granby. Rail connections later served industrial and agricultural traffic in the area.

Rail service through the former West Shefford corridor declined during the 20th century, and the community no longer has regular passenger railway service.

=== Air ===
Aéroport régional Roland-Désourdy opened in 1968 as a regional airport serving the Brome, Missisquoi and Shefford area. It was developed beside Bromont's emerging industrial park.

The airport was later named for Roland Désourdy, who was involved in its establishment and in the development of Bromont's industrial sector. The name Aéroport régional Roland-Désourdy was officially adopted in 2012.

== Government ==
Bromont is governed by a mayor and six municipal councillors, each representing an electoral district. Michelle Champagne was elected mayor in the November 2025 municipal election.

Federally, Bromont is part of Brome—Missisquoi, represented in the House of Commons of Canada by Liberal MP Louis Villeneuve.

Provincially, the city is part of the Brome-Missisquoi electoral district, represented in the National Assembly of Quebec by Isabelle Charest of the Coalition Avenir Québec.

mayors of Bromont
Mayor	Term	Party
Germain Désourdy	1964–1977	Independent
Robert Leboeuf	1977–1978	Independent
Pierre Jacob	1978–1982	Independent
Pierre Bellefleur	1982–1996	Independent
Robert Désourdy	1996–1998	Independent
Pauline Quinlan	1998–2017	Independent
Louis Villeneuve	2017–2025	Independent
Michelle Champagne	2025–present	Demain Bromont

Town Council of Bromont
District	Councillor	Party
1	Manon Gaumond	Demain Bromont
2	Claire Mailhot	Independent
3	Lucie Riendeau	Demain Bromont
4	Martin Lavoie	Demain Bromont
5	Mathieu Lymburner	Independent
6	Patrick Métivier	Independent

== See also ==
- Brome-Missisquoi Regional County Municipality
- Mont Brome
- Olympic Equestrian Centre, Bromont
- Ski Bromont
- Vélodrome Sylvan Adams
- List of cities in Quebec
