= Vélodrome Sylvan Adams =

Indoor velodrome in Bromont, Quebec, Canada

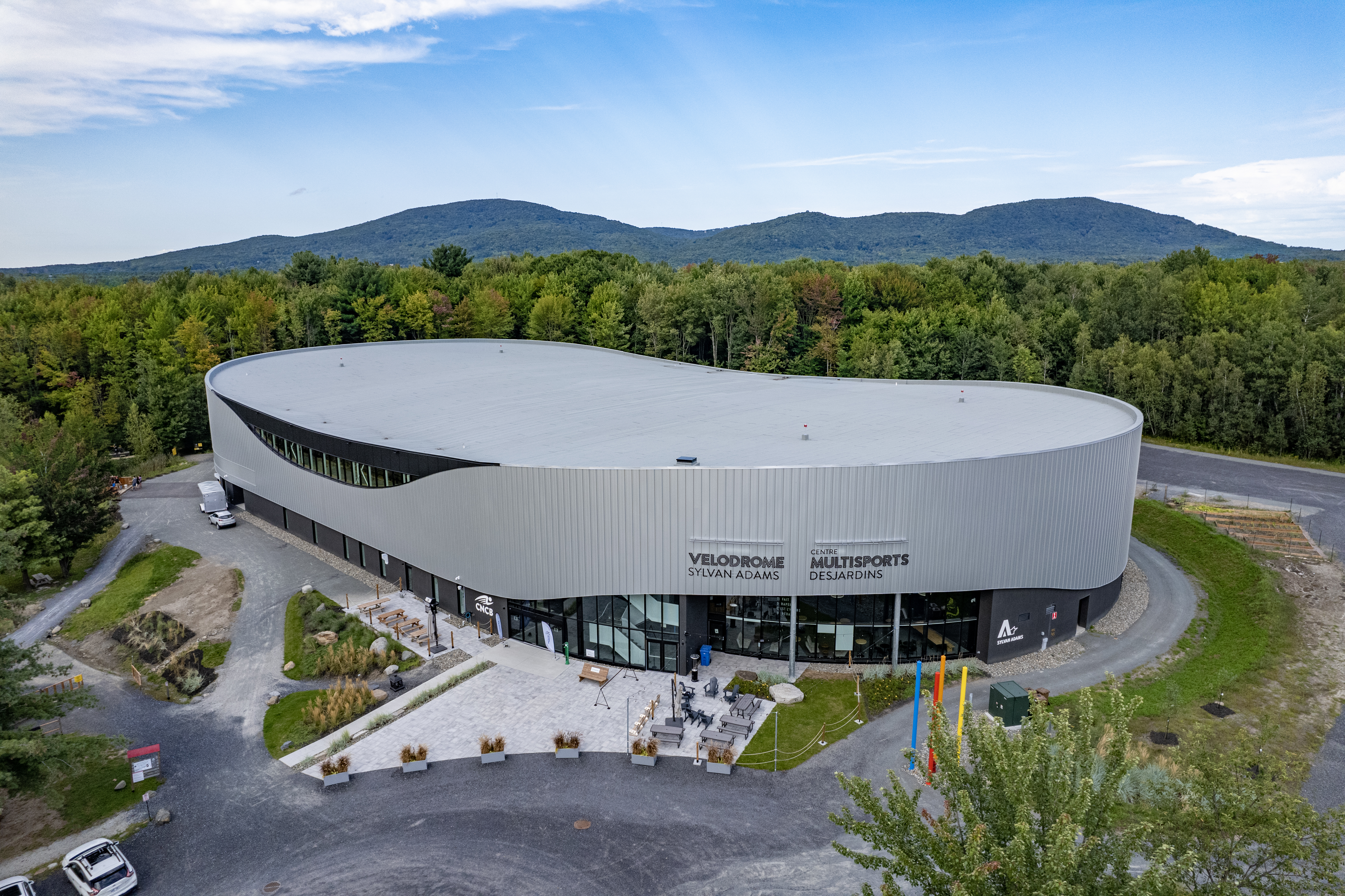
- Interactive map of Vélodrome Sylvan Adams
- Full name: Vélodrome Sylvan Adams - Centre Multisports Desjardins
- Address: 400 rue Shefford; Bromont, Quebec; Canada
- Coordinates: 45.323796°N 72.642280°W
- Owner: Bromont, Quebec
- Surface: Wood
- Field size: 250 meter oval

Construction
- Opened: September 2022
- Cost: $22m

Tenant
- Bromont National Cycling Centre

Website
- https://centrenationalbromont.com

The Vélodrome Sylvan Adams - Centre Multisports Desjardins is a 250-meter indoor cycling track located in Bromont, Quebec, Canada. Built to replace the outdoor Bromont Velodrome, the track opened in September 2022. As well as a velodrome, the building has an BMX pump track, indoor running track, gym and sports courts. Unlike the previous velodrome, the venue can be used year round.

The velodrome was built at a cost of $22m, funded by the Government of Quebec with contributions from billionaire (and passionate cyclist) Sylvan Adams, Desjardins and the local municipality of Bromont. As with the previous velodrome, it is operated by the Centre National de Cyclisme de Bromont (Bromont National Cycling Centre). It remains a national training centre for Canadian athletes. The venue was set to host the 2023 Canadian track cycling championships.

Work to replace the outdoor Bromont Velodrome began in 2014, with construction beginning in April 2021. Works were led by Ontarian Peter Junek.

This is the second 250m indoor velodrome in Canada, after the Mattamy National Cycling Centre in Milton, Ontario, opened in 2015. It was expected to be joined by a rebuilt Argyll Velodrome in Edmonton, Alberta in 2026. The last indoor velodrome in Quebec closed in 1988, when the one built for the 1976 Summer Olympics closed to be converted to the Montreal Biodome.

== Bromont Velodrome ==
The Bromont Velodrome was a 250-metre outdoor cycling track located in Bromont, Quebec. It was originally built for the 1996 Atlanta Olympics, and spent from 1996 to 2000 in storage before being purchased and relocated to Canada. The track opened in June 2001. It was operated by the Bromont National Cycling Centre. The velodrome was a national training centre for both track cycling and track para-cycling. The track closed in 2020, as it had reached the end of life thanks to 20 years of weather on the wooden track.

== See also ==
- List of cycling tracks and velodromes
