= Marcel Adams =

Canadian Holocaust survivor and founder of Iberville Developments

- Born: Marcel Abramovich; 2 August 1920; Piatra Neamț, Romania
- Died: 11 August 2020 (aged 100); Montreal, Canada
- Occupation: Businessman
- Known for: Founder of Iberville Developments
- Spouse: Annie Adams (m. 1953; died 1997)
- Children: 4, including Sylvan Adams

Marcel Adams (2 August 1920 – 11 August 2020) was a Canadian real estate investor, billionaire, and Holocaust survivor.

== Biography ==
Marcel Abramovich (later Adams) was born to a Jewish family in Romania in 1920. His father was a tanner. During World War II he was forced to work in Nazi labor camps (1941–1944). He escaped and fled first to Turkey and then to Mandatory Palestine where he fought for the independence of Israel. In 1951, he immigrated to Canada where he worked at a Quebec City tannery. In 1955, he began investing in real estate making a 70% profit on his first building. In 1958, he founded Iberville Developments and in 1959, he opened his first mall. Adams retired and his son, Sylvan Adams, operated the company for almost 25 years, before being succeeded by his own son, Josh. As of 2017, Iberville owns and manages a diverse portfolio of over 100 properties consisting of eight million square feet.

== Personal life ==
In 1953, he married Annie Adams; they had four children: Julian, Sylvan, Linda, and Leora. His son Julian is a biochemist who led a team that developed the drug Velcade; his son Sylvan ran Iberville; his daughter Linda is a lawyer married to commentator Gil Troy; and his daughter Leora is a nurse. Annie died in November 1997.

Adams died on August 11, 2020, at the age of 100.
