= 2021 Israeli presidential election =

- 2 June 2021

120 members of the Knesset Simple majority of votes needed to win
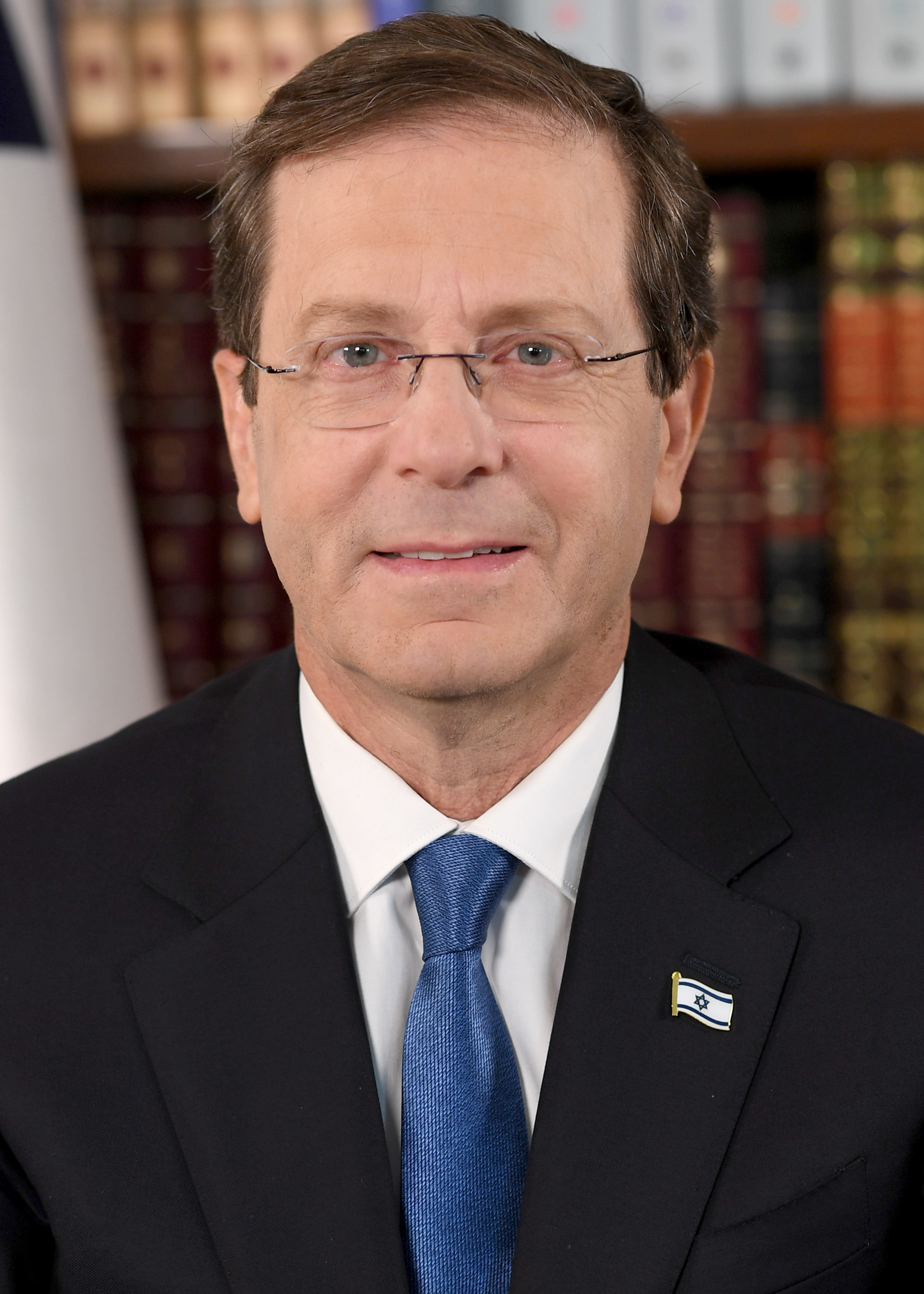

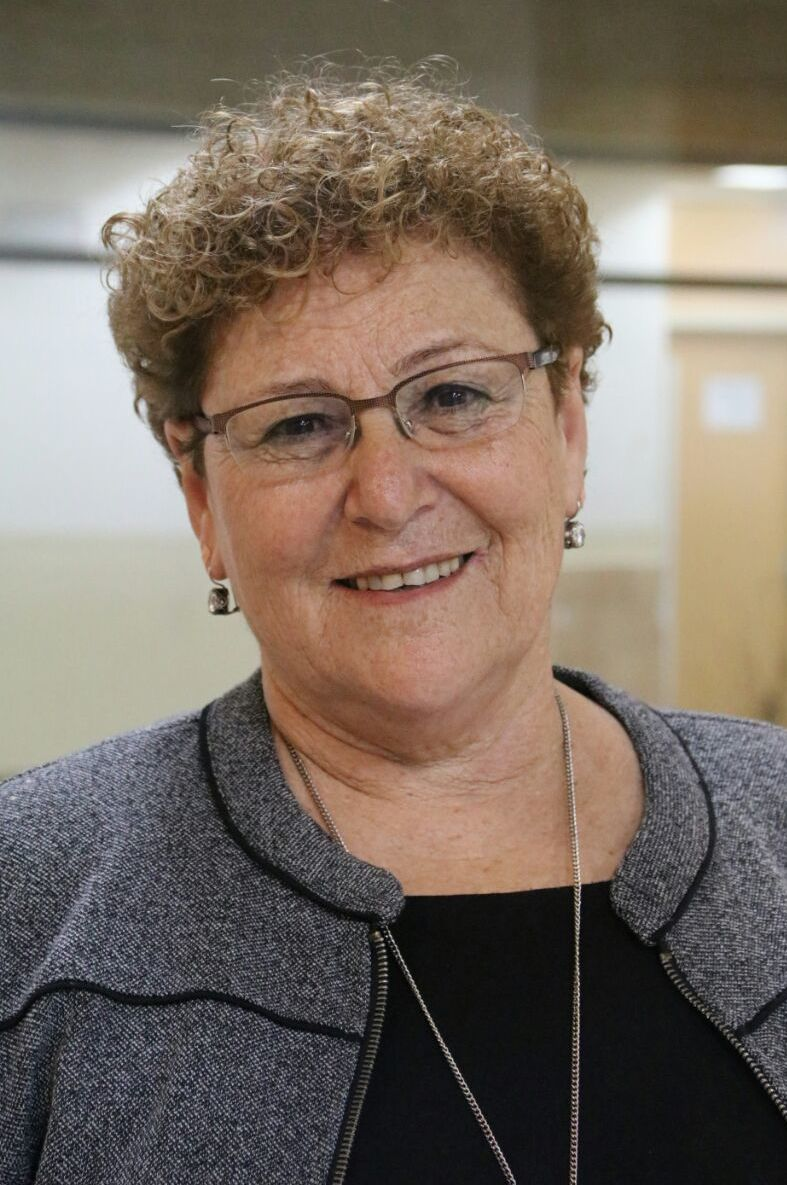
Nominee	Isaac Herzog	Miriam Peretz
Party	Independent	Independent
Electoral vote	87	26
President before election
Reuven Rivlin
Likud
Elected President
Isaac Herzog
Independent

Indirect presidential elections were held in Israel on 2 June 2021. The President of Israel is elected by members of the Knesset for a single seven-year term. Incumbent President Reuven Rivlin, who had been in office since 24 July 2014, was ineligible for re-election.

The presidency is a largely ceremonial position, wielding little real power. The president's main role is meeting the leaders of each party following legislative elections to discuss nominations for prime minister, and giving a mandate to try and form a government to the candidate they deem most likely to succeed.

The election was notable for several firsts. Namely, neither of the candidates was a sitting member of the Knesset, and both ran as independents. Furthermore, the election of Peretz would have made her the first non-interim female head of state of Israel, while Herzog's victory made him the first child of a former president to be elected president.

Isaac Herzog was elected the 11th President of Israel with 87 Knesset members voting for him, which was the most votes a candidate had ever received (exceeding the vote count for candidates who won in elections that were uncontested). The prior record was 86 votes, which was held by Zalman Shazar (1968), Yitzhak Navon (1978), and Shimon Peres (2007, in the second round). In all three cases, the candidates receiving 86 votes were unopposed (in the case of Peres, his opponents dropped out for the second round).

Herzog was inaugurated as president on 7 July. He was sworn in at a ceremony at the Knesset, where he took the oath of office on the same 107-year-old Bible that his father Chaim Herzog used when he assumed the presidency in 1983.

== Background ==
On 9 July 2021, incumbent President Reuven Rivlin is expected to end his seven-year term, and according to section 3 (b) of the Basic Law: President of the State, the President of the State will serve only one term. The date of the election will be determined by the Knesset presidency, in which 120 Knesset members will be required to convene a plenum and elect the eleventh president by secret ballot. According to the law, the election date will be set between thirty and ninety days before the end of the outgoing president's term, but due to the elections to the 24th Knesset being held in close proximity to the date, and due to the law's obligation to announce the election date three weeks earlier, the earliest possible election date is 69 days before the end of Rivlin's term on 27 April.

On 22 April 2020, MK Merav Michaeli of the Labor Party submitted a bill which states that a criminal suspect or defendant will not be able to run for president. The bill's goal was to ensure that Israeli Prime Minister Benjamin Netanyahu, who is accused of crimes, was not able to run for president. However, the law was not adopted.

On 24 May 2021, the chairman of the organizing committee, MK Karine Elharrar from Yesh Atid, threatened to refuse to schedule the presidential election. The dispute arose after the Knesset speaker blocked all private members' bills on the floor of the Knesset, fearing that bills targeting Netanyahu, such as the bill preventing someone facing criminal charges from serving as prime minister, may advance. Likud refused this request and the two parties remained in a stalemate. Yesh Atid believe that delaying or cancelling the presidential election is the only way to force Likud's hand and to get a vote on their legislation in the Knesset. In the case where there is no election, the speaker, Yariv Levin of the Likud will be appointed as the president on an interim basis.

== Procedure ==
The election is conducted in the Knesset, with each member receiving one vote. The election is conducted in a two-round system. If a candidate does not receive a majority in the first round, a runoff is conducted. The ballots are kept secret.

Any Israeli citizen is eligible to run for president. In November 2013, Attorney General Yehuda Weinstein ruled that candidates would be barred from raising funds to finance their campaigns.

== Candidates ==
Official candidacy requires the endorsement of 10 Members of the Knesset. By the deadline of 20 May, only two people had gained the support of 10 or more MKs:

- Isaac Herzog: chairman of the Jewish Agency for Israel, former Leader of the Opposition. Obtained 27 signatures, from MKs from all parties in the Knesset, except the Arab parties.
- Miriam Peretz: educator and public speaker. Obtained the support of 11 MKs.

=== Candidates who failed to be eligible for election ===
- Yosef Abramowitz: "solar energy pioneer"
- Michael Bar-Zohar: former Member of Knesset for the Alignment and Labor Party. Bar-Zohar dropped out of the race on 19 May and endorsed Herzog.
- Yehoram Gaon: singer and actor Gaon dropped out of the race on 19 May.
- Yehudah Glick: former Member of Knesset for Likud. 43rd on the Likud list for the election to the 24th Knesset. Glick dropped out of the race on 19 May.
- Elham Khazen: pharmacist, former head of Blue and White's Women in Arab Society division and former Labor Party candidate.
- Amir Peretz: former leader of the Labor Party and incumbent Minister of Economy. Former Minister of Defence and former mayor of Sderot. Peretz dropped out of the race on 5 May.
- Shimon Shetreet: first candidate to announce interest in running, professor of law and former Minister and Member of Knesset for the Labor Party. 68th on Labor list in the 2021 elections.

== Opinion polls ==
Although the public was not able to vote in the election, opinion polls were conducted to determine public support for the candidates.

Pollster	Date	Sample	Miriam Peretz	Isaac Herzog	None of them	Undecided
Direct Polls	21 May 2021	684 (Note: Sample includes Israeli Jews only)	49.05%	38.36%	6.88%	5.71%

Pollster	Date	Miriam Peretz	Yoram Gaon	Isaac Herzog	Amir Peretz	Yuli Edelstein	Shimon Shetreet	Yehudah Glick	Benjamin Netanyahu
Kol Ha'ir	1 January 2021	27.7%	16.4%	11.6%	8.4%	8.4%	4%	3.1%	-
Channel 20/Magar Mohot	11 October 2020	50%	-	-	10%	9%	5%	3%	23%
Channel 12 /Direct Polls	3 August 2020	44%	-	18%	9%	14%	-	-	-

== Results ==
Candidate	Party	Votes	%
Isaac Herzog	Independent	87	76.99
Miriam Peretz	Independent	26	23.01
Total		113	100.00
Valid votes		113	94.96
Invalid votes		3	2.52
Blank votes		3	2.52
Total votes		119	100.00
Registered voters/turnout		120	99.17
Source: Knesset

The only member of the Knesset not to cast a vote was Mansour Abbas.

== See also ==
- 2021 Israeli legislative election
