= Roland-Désourdy Airport =

Roland-Désourdy Airport Bromont (Roland Désourdy) Airport
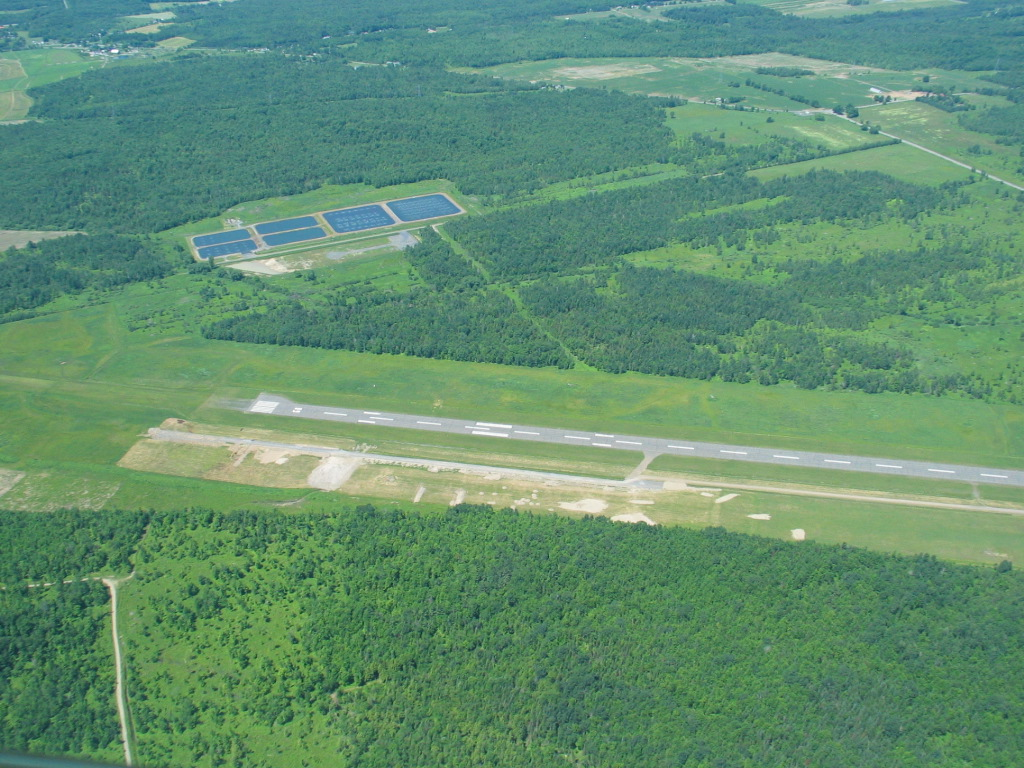
- Glider runway at the airport
- IATA: ZBM; ICAO: CZBM

Summary
- Airport type: Public
- Operator: Régie Aéroportuaire Régionale des Cantons de l'Est
- Location: Bromont, Quebec
- Time zone: EST (UTC−05:00)
  - Summer (DST): EDT (UTC−04:00)
- Elevation AMSL: 375 ft / 114 m
- Coordinates: 45°17′27″N 072°44′31″W
- Website: aeroport.bromont.qc.ca

Map
- Location in Quebec

Runways
Direction	Length		Surface
Direction	ft	m	Surface
05/23	5,004	1,525	Asphalt

Statistics (2010)
- Aircraft movements: 5,607
- Source: Canada Flight Supplement; Movements from Statistics Canada.

The Roland-Désourdy Airport (IATA: ZBM, ICAO: CZBM) (formerly known as Eastern Townships Regional Airport or simply Bromont Airport) is located 3.4 nautical miles (6.3 km; 3.9 mi) west-southwest of Bromont, Quebec, Canada.

Traffic at Roland-Désourdy Airport is represented mainly by small, single-engine aircraft; jets and big aircraft are not common. The airport serves general aviation and has no scheduled flights.

A commercial aircraft maintenance facility also operates in ZBM.

The airport is classified as an airport of entry by Nav Canada and is staffed by the Canada Border Services Agency (CBSA). CBSA officers at this airport can handle commercial and general aviation aircraft, with no more than 15 passengers.

== Usage ==
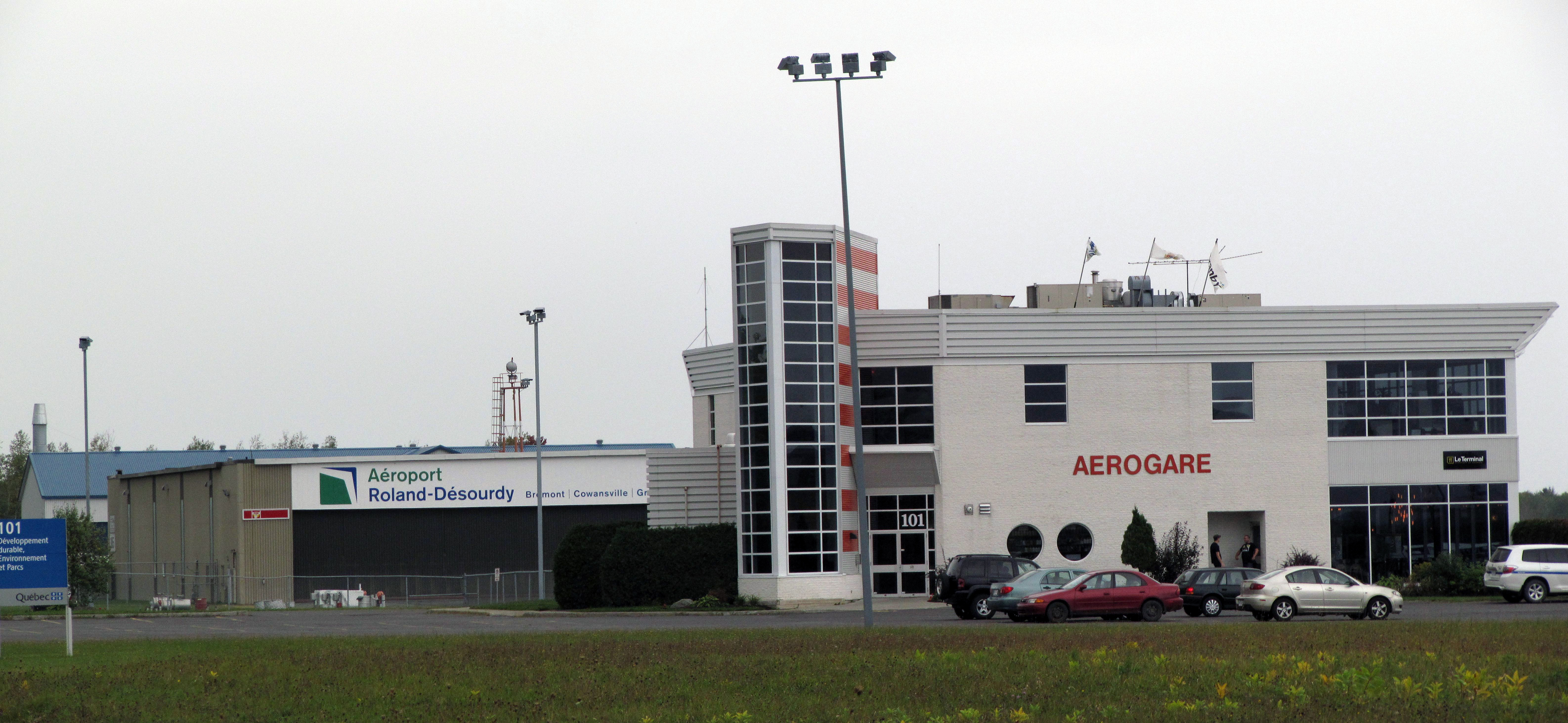
Terminal building

This airport was built for sport-type aviation; there is a school that operates three classic light single-engine aircraft, Cessna 150, Cessna 172 and Piper Cherokee. The Royal Canadian Air Cadets fly time tested, Schweizer SGS 2-33 gliders with tow plane, and O-1 Bird Dog (Cessna L-19), during spring and late summer camps dedicated to introduction flights for kids and during summer to take young student pilots for solo flight and glider pilot licensing.

The ACE Glider Club is based at the Roland-Désourdy Airport and glider and soaring flight operations normally span from April to October. Military Glider flight operations (Air Cadets) take place only from the grass runway Air cadets tow planes take off from the grass runway and land on the asphalt runway. Operation of high performance civil gliders take place on the asphalt runway at ZBM. These high performance gliders use the same pattern and procedures as all other motorized aircraft.

From Roland-Désourdy Airport, it is possible to soar the cold front wave with a good performance sailplane and, when the meteorological conditions are favourable, it is possible to get airborne and get into a steady lift of more than 500 ft/min (152 m/min), over very wide areas. With such conditions, one can fly a glider straight at speeds over 180 km/h (112 mph) without losing altitude, making sure not to exceed maximum rough air speed limits in such conditions.

The Roland-Désourdy Airport cold front wave is very predictable; the special meteorological pattern can be spotted before 1200 UTC time, and it repeats itself 63 percent of the time with onsetting cold fronts.

During spring 2007, work began on the construction of a new 2,000 ft × 25 ft (610 m × 8 m) asphalt runway that permits optimum military glider operations (Air Cadets) which is now 5,004 ft × 100 ft (1,525 m × 30 m). Military training Gliders will be able to take off behind tow from the new runway and land on grass; after landing, the gliders will be in position for the next take off.

The last decades of the 20th century saw a progressive decline of private pilot flights and a decreasing number of small aircraft. The fleet of this region is aging and very few new aircraft are seen due to increasing costs. The possibility to fly ultralight, hang gliders and paragliders attracts many flight enthusiasts.
