= Gil Troy =

American historian, author, and scholar

Gil Troy (born 1961) is an American presidential historian and a popular commentator on politics and other issues. He is a professor of history at McGill University. Troy is the author of twelve books, and the editor of two. He writes a column for The Daily Beast on forgotten history, putting current events in historical perspective and is a columnist for The Jerusalem Post.

== Biography ==
Troy was born in Queens, New York. He is the brother of Dan Troy and Tevi David Troy. He attended Jamaica High School, and received his bachelor's degree, master's degree, and doctorate from Harvard University.

== Academic career ==
Troy taught history and literature at Harvard University from 1988 to 1990. He has taught history at McGill University since 1990. Troy has authored seven books on the American presidency and the history of presidential campaigning, including biographies of Ronald Reagan and Hillary Clinton, and edited two others, including a revised edition of a comprehensive reference guide to American presidential elections previously edited by noted historian Arthur M. Schlesinger, Jr. He has written numerous articles on the presidency and presidential elections that have appeared in The New York Times, The Wilson Quarterly, and other newspapers, magazines and journals. He has served as visiting scholar at the Bipartisan Policy Center and on the advisory board of the History News Network. The History News Network designated him one of the first "top young historians," and Maclean's Magazine has repeatedly identified him as one of McGill's "popular Profs."

== Zionist activism ==
Troy is a prominent activist in the debate over Zionism and the future of Israel. He has been a Shalom Hartman Center Research Fellow and helped found the center's Engaging Israel Program. His articles on the subject have appeared in The New Republic and elsewhere, and he has written two books, Why I am a Zionist and Moynihan's Moment: America's Fight Against Zionism as Racism, which David G. Dalin, writing in the National Review, called "beautifully written, and rich in its insight and analysis ... the definitive account of this episode and of why its legacy is an enduring one." Jewish Ideas Daily designated Moynihan's Moment one of its "best books" of 2012, it was the winner of a 2014 J.I. Segal Award in the category of English Non-Fiction Award on a Jewish Theme, and his article "Democracy, Judaism, and War" won a 2014 Simon Rockower Award for Excellence in Single Commentary.

== Personal life ==
Troy is married to the artist Linda Adams, daughter of Canadian real estate investor Marcel Adams.

== Publications ==
- To Resist the Academic Intifada: Letters to My Students on Defending the Zionist Dream. Wicked Son Press, New York, 2024. ISBN 979-8-88-845890-7
- The Essential Guide to October 7th and its Aftermath, 2023
- The Zionist Ideas; Visions for the Jewish Homeland — Then, Now, Tomorrow (2018)
- The Age of Clinton: America in the 1990s. St. Martin's Press, 2015. ISBN 978-1-25-006372-4
- Moynihan's Moment: America's Fight Against Zionism as Racism. Oxford University Press, 2012. ISBN 978-0-19-992030-3
- History of American Presidential Elections 1789–2008. (4th edition, Arthur M. Schlesinger, Jr., Gil Troy & Fred L. Israel, editors). Facts on File, 2011. ISBN 978-0-8160-8220-9
- Living in the Eighties. (Gil Troy & Vincent J. Cannato, editors). Oxford University Press, 2009. ISBN 978-0-19-518787-8
- The Reagan Revolution: A Very Short Introduction. Oxford University Press, 2009. ISBN 978-0-19-531710-7
- Hillary Rodham Clinton: Polarizing First Lady. University Press of Kansas, 2008. ISBN 978-0-7006-1585-8
- Leading from the Center: Why Moderates Make the Best Presidents. Basic Books, 2008. ISBN 0-465-00293-5 (In paperback: Why Moderates Make the Best Presidents: From George Washington to Barack Obama. University Press of Kansas, 2012. ISBN 978-0-7006-1883-5)
- Morning in America: How Ronald Reagan Invented the 1980s. Princeton University Press, 2007. ISBN 978-0-691-13060-6
- Why I Am a Zionist: Israel, Jewish Identity and the Challenges of Today. Bronfman Jewish Education Center, 2002. ISBN 978-1-55234-647-1
- Affairs of State: The Rise and Rejection of the Presidential Couple Since World War II. Free Press, 1997. ISBN 978-0-684-82820-6. (In paperback: Mr. & Mrs. President: From the Trumans to the Clintons. University Press of Kansas, 2000. ISBN 978-0-7006-1034-1)
- See How They Ran: The Changing Role of the Presidential Candidate. (Revised and expanded edition.) Harvard University Press, 1996. ISBN 978-0-674-79680-5
