= Miriam Peretz =

Israeli educator and public speaker

- מרים פרץ
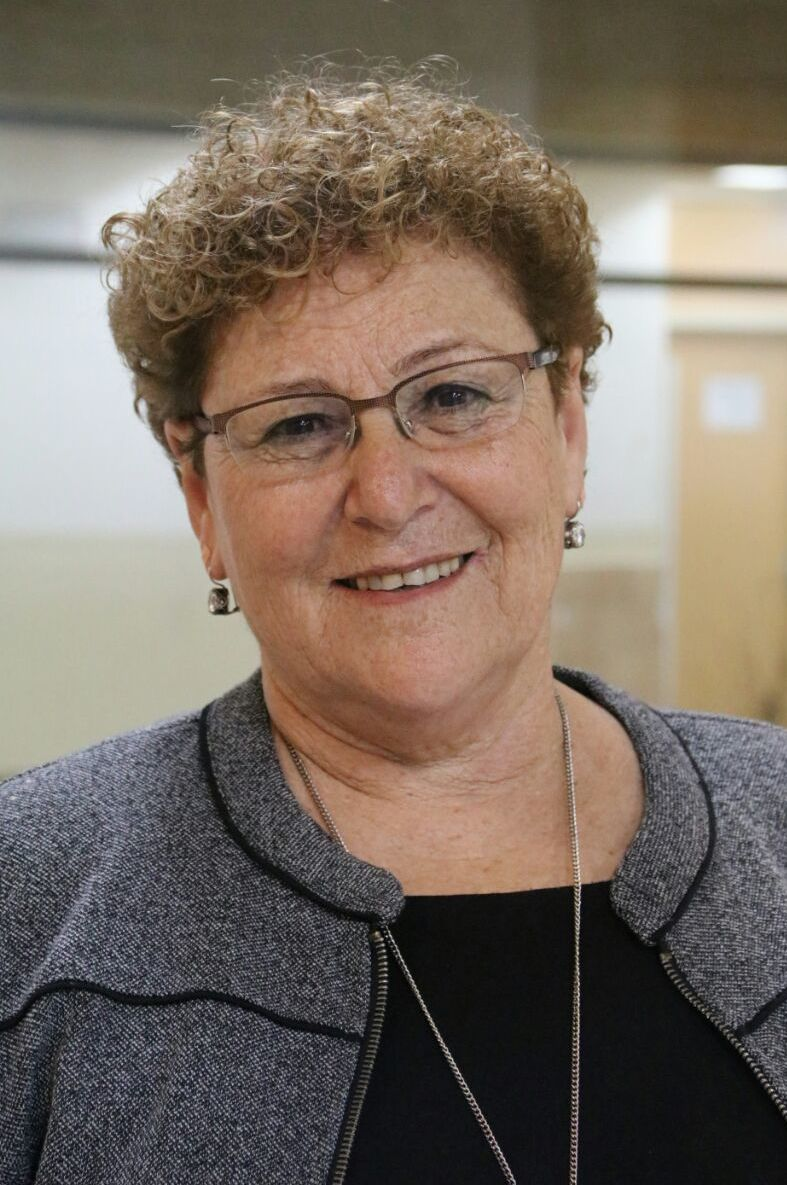
- Born: 10 April 1954 (age 72); Casablanca, French Morocco
- Education: Ben-Gurion University of the Negev (BA)
- Occupations: Educator; public speaker
- Political party: Independent
- Spouse: Eliezer Peretz
- Children: 6
- Awards: Israel Prize (2018)

Miriam Peretz (Hebrew: מרים פרץ; born 10 April 1954) is an Israeli educator and public speaker. After the deaths of two of her sons during their service in the Israel Defense Forces, Peretz became a lecturer on Zionism and living with loss. She was the recipient of the Israel Prize in 2018, for lifetime achievement.

In May 2021, Peretz announced that she would run for President of Israel in the 2021 election as an independent candidate. She ended up losing the election to Isaac Herzog, 26–87.

== Early life and education ==
Peretz was born to Moroccan Jewish parents Yaakov Ohayon and Ito Vaknin in Casablanca, Morocco. In 1963, the family left Morocco and made aliyah to Israel. Upon arriving in Israel, they settled in Beersheba. Peretz went on to earn a bachelor's degree in literature and history from Ben-Gurion University of the Negev, and later married Eliezer Peretz in the mid-1970s. After her marriage, she moved to Ofira, an Israeli settlement on the Sinai Peninsula, where her husband worked as an inspector for the Ministry of Health and she began working as a teacher. While living in Ofira, the family had two sons: Uriel and Eliraz.

Following the signing of the Egypt–Israel peace treaty, the Sinai Peninsula was returned to Egypt in 1982, and Israeli settlers were forced to relocate. Peretz and her family first relocated to Giv'on HaHadasha, and later to Giv'at Ze'ev, both Israeli settlements in the West Bank. After the relocation, Peretz had four more children: Hadas, Avichai, Elisaf, and Bat-El. In Giv'at Ze'ev, Peretz became the principal of the settlement's first Israeli school.

== Public speaking ==
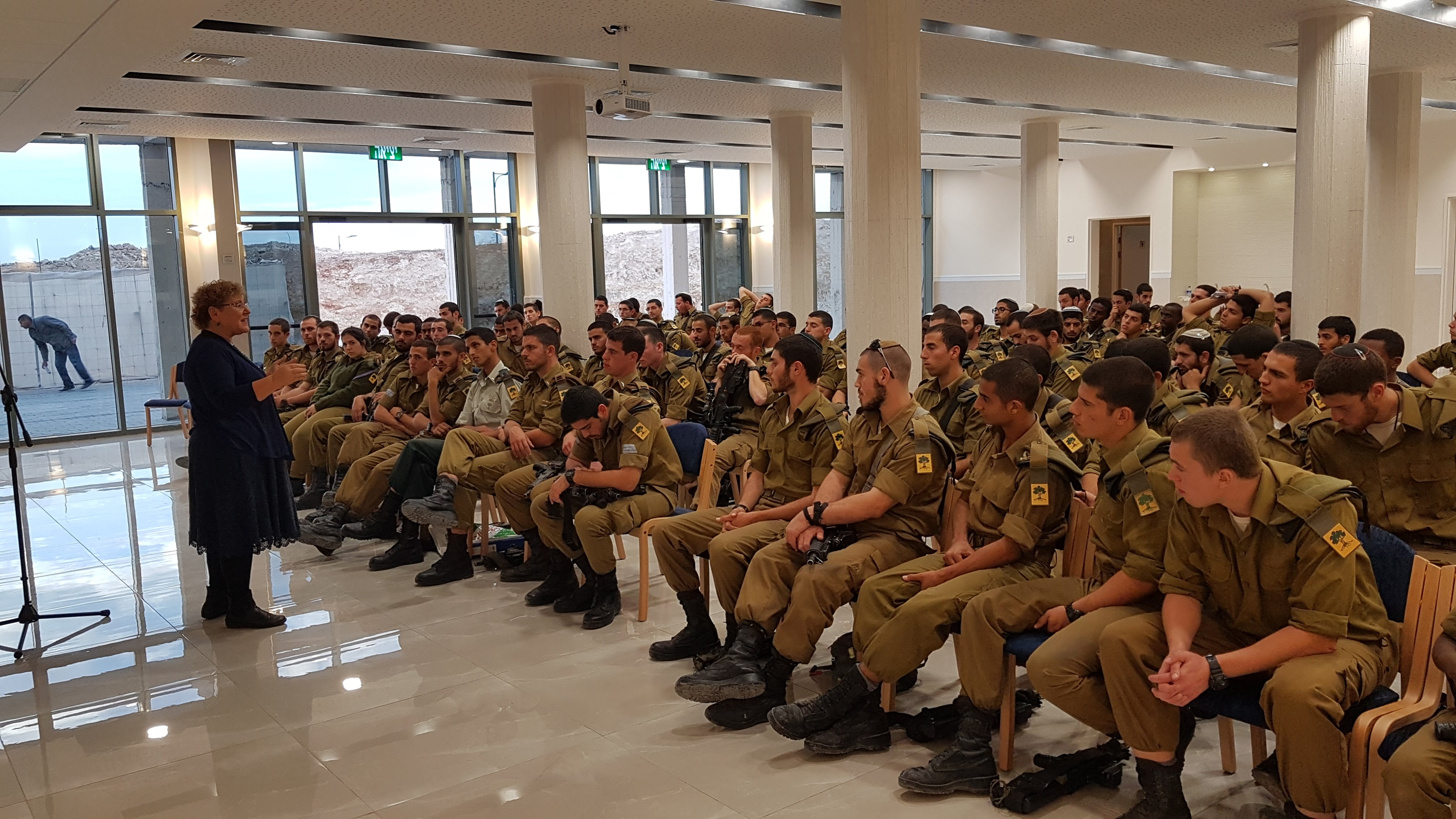
Peretz lecturing Israel Defense Forces soldiers in 2017.

In 1998, Peretz's eldest son Uriel Peretz was killed during an ambush in South Lebanon. Shortly after his death, Peretz's husband Eliezer developed a serious illness and later died as well. In 2010, Peretz's second son Eliraz Peretz was killed in the March 2010 Israel–Gaza clashes.

Following the deaths of her two eldest sons and her husband, Peretz became a public speaker on issues surrounding Zionism and coping with loss, lecturing the youth and Israel Defense Forces soldiers. In 2011, she released the book Shirat Miriam, which chronicles the story of her life. In 2014, Peretz was selected to light a torch at the celebration of Israel's 66th Independence Day. In 2016, she received an honorary doctorate from Bar-Ilan University. In 2018, Peretz received the Israel Prize for lifetime achievement, considered to be the highest cultural honor awarded by Israel.

== Politics ==
In May 2021, Peretz announced that she would run for president of Israel in the 2021 election. Presidential candidates must secure the support of at least 10 members of the Knesset in order to run in the election, which Peretz did. She ended up losing the election to Isaac Herzog, 26–87.

== Personal life ==
Peretz continues to reside in Giv'at Ze'ev. She currently serves as the head of a teacher education centre within the Society and Youth Directorate at the Israeli Ministry of Education.
