= Herzliya Pituah =

Herzliya Pituah הרצליה פיתוח
- Neighborhood
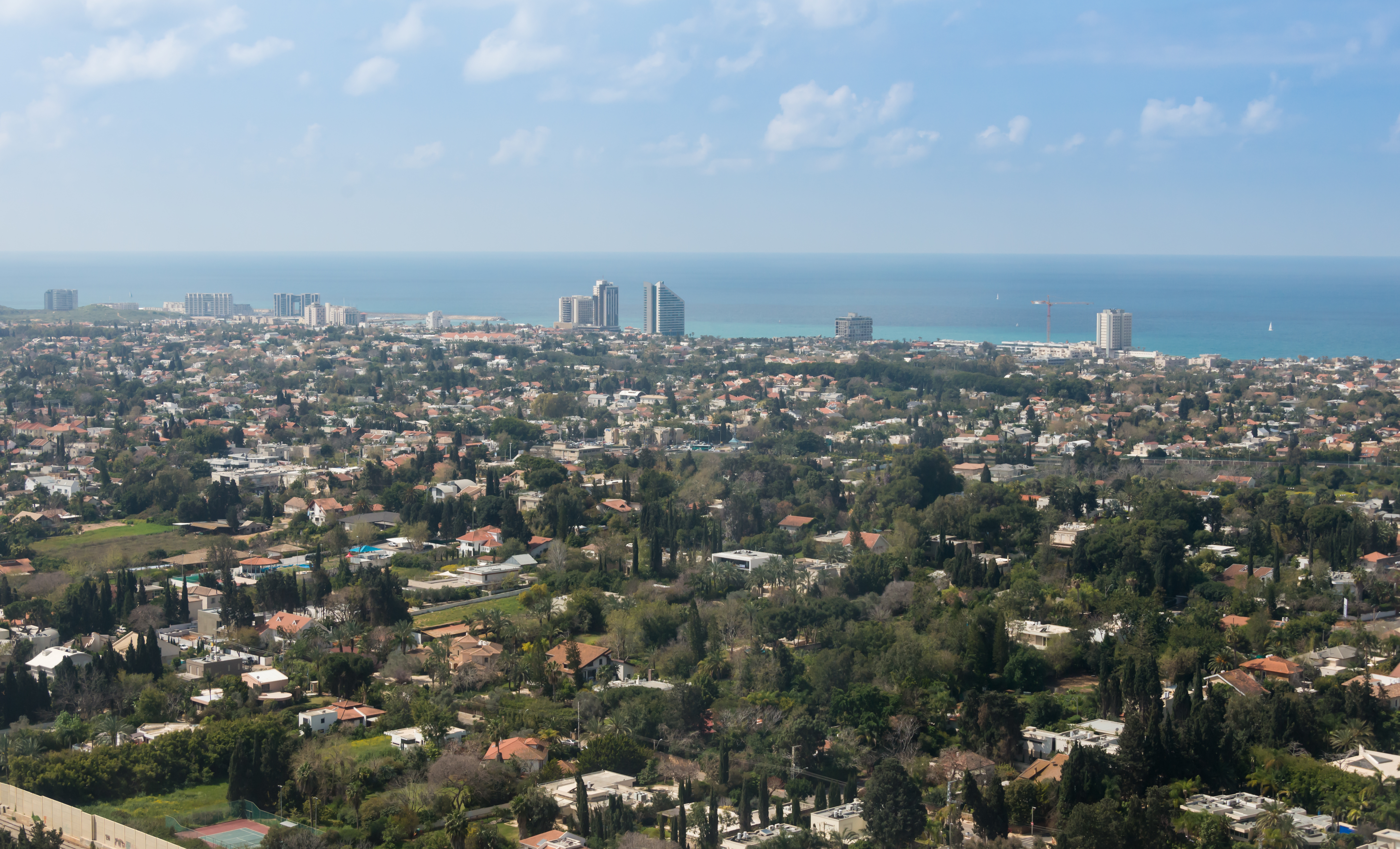
- View of Herzliya Pituah
- Etymology: Theodor Herzl
- Location within Israel
- Coordinates: 32.172852°N 34.811425°E
- Country: Israel
- Time zone: UTC+02:00 (Israel Standard Time)
  - Summer (DST): UTC+03:00 (Israel Summer Time)

Herzliya Pituah (also, Herzliya Pituach) (Hebrew: הרצליה פיתוח) is an affluent beachfront neighbourhood in the western part of the city of Herzliya, Israel, in the Tel Aviv District. Established in 1925, it has about 10,000 residents. Home to many wealthy Israelis, it is known for its hotels, restaurants and high-tech industry, and has the largest marina in Israel. It is considered one of Israel's most prestigious neighbourhoods.

Most buildings in the residential areas of Herzliya Pituah are villas, though there are also luxury apartments. Galei Tchelet Street, located on a cliff adjacent to the beach in the north-western part of the neighborhood, is the most expensive street in Israel, and is home to the residences of several foreign ambassadors. Adjacent to the beach is a strip containing several hotels. The Herzliya Medical Center is located in this strip. At the southern end of the hotel strip is the Herzliya Marina, which covers an area of 500 dunams (50 hectares; 120 acres). The marina complex includes the Arena shopping mall and a variety of restaurants overlooking the water. It is the largest marina in Israel.

In the southeast part of Herzliya Pituah is the industrial zone. Originally home to factories, it is now a major high-tech center with local headquarters of companies such as Microsoft, Apple, SolarEdge, WeWork, Plarium and many venture capital firms. The area has many restaurants and commercial areas.

== Parks and beaches ==
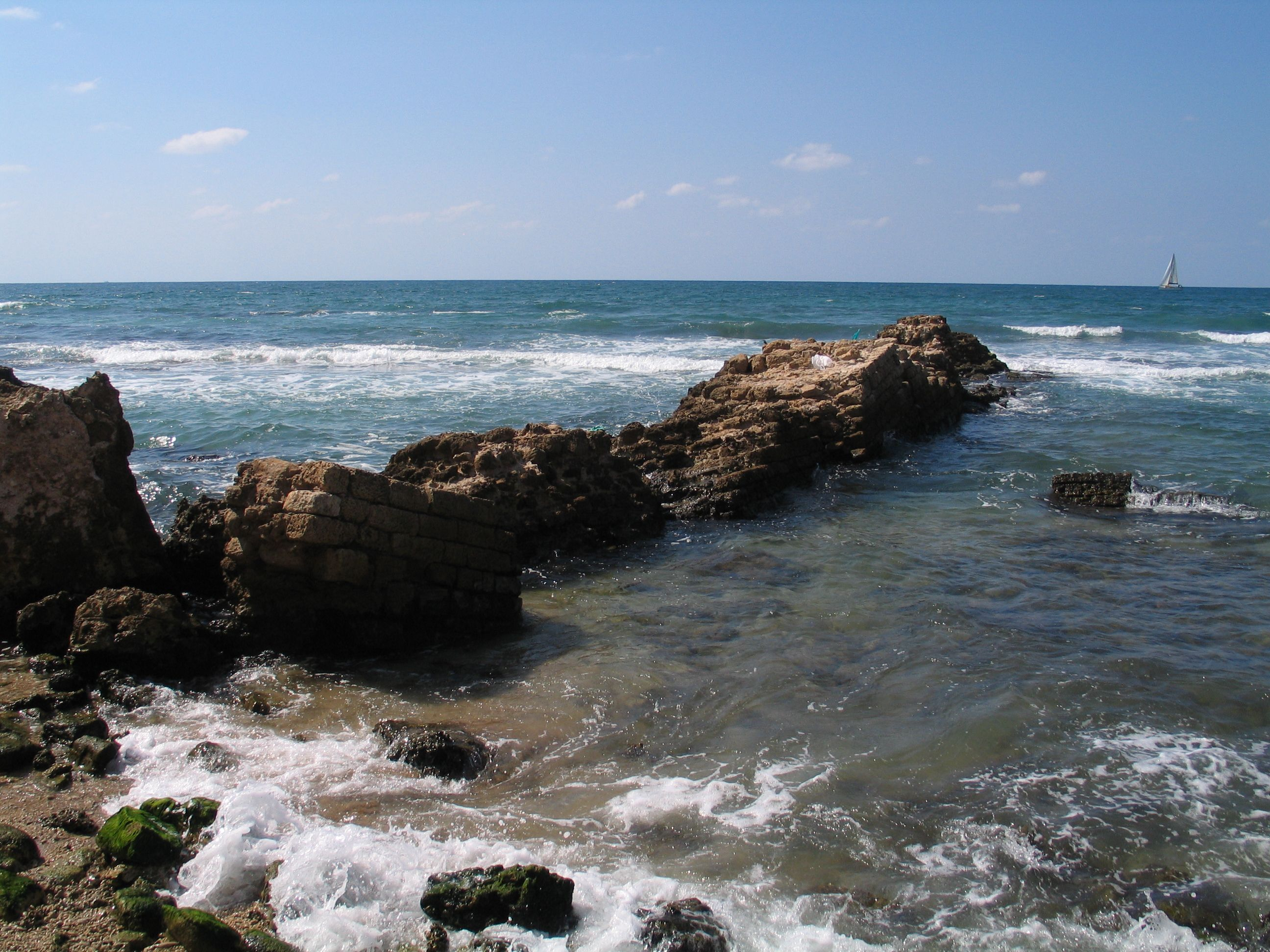
Apollonia Beach

- Apollonia Beach – Part of the national park containing archaeological finds from the Phoenician village of Arsuf, through the Roman and Byzantine city, to the Crusader fortress of the 13th century.
- Sidna-'Ali Beach (Nof Yam) – Named after the historic Sidna Ali Mosque. Perched on a ledge 100m north of the entrance to the beach is the Hermit House built by Nissim Kahlon out of tires, bottles, broken plates and other debris washed ashore.
- Sharon Beach
- Zvulun Beach – Home of the Herzliya Sea Scouts
- Accadia Beach – Named for the nearby Dan Accadia Hotel, this is the largest beach in Herzliya Pituah.
- Hof HaNechim – A wheelchair-accessible beach with facilities for the handicapped.
- HaHof HaNifrad – A beach for Orthodox Jews with separate days for men and women.

== Notable residents ==
- Mori Arkin (born 1952/53), businessman
- Michael Fox (1934–2009), British-Israeli lawyer
- Shirley Porter (1930–2026), British politician
- Dina Recanati (1928–2021), artist, sculptor, and painter
- Teddy Sagi (born 1971), businessman
- Lonah Chemtai Salpeter (born 1988), Kenya-born Israeli Olympic marathon runner

== See also ==
- Tel Michal
