= Rubel Castle =

Historic house in California, United States

- Rubel Castle Historic District
- U.S. National Register of Historic Places
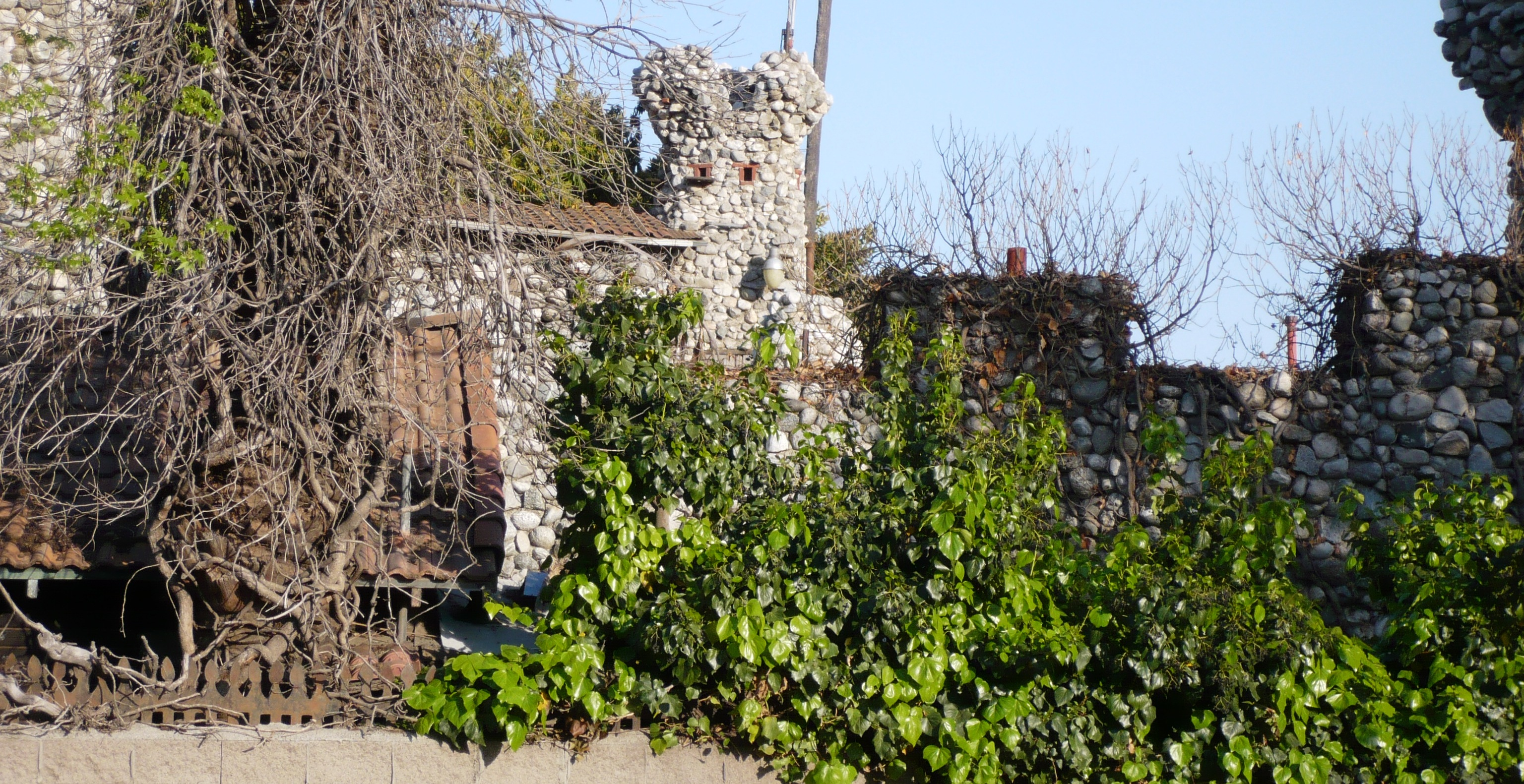

- Location within the Los Angeles metropolitan area Location within California Location within the United States
- Location: 844 N. Live Oak Ave., Glendora, California
- Coordinates: 34°9′1″N 117°51′17″W
- Built: 1959 to 1986
- Architectural style: Folk art environment
- Website: www.glendorahistory.org/castle
- NRHP reference No.: 13000810
- Added to NRHP: October 7, 2013

Rubel Castle (AKA Rubelia or Rubel Pharms)) was established in Glendora, California, by Michael Clarke Rubel (April 16, 1940 – October 15, 2007) and is owned and operated by the Glendora Historical Society.

In 1959, a teenage Michael Rubel purchased a 1.7 acres (6,900 m^{2}) plot dominated by an old reservoir and packing house from a recently defunct citrus orchard. Continuing a childhood passion of building forts and other improvised structures, he and his friends soon embarked on a building program that was only completed in 1986. Rubel Castle was constructed out of concrete as well as nontraditional materials including scrap steel, rocks, bedsprings, coat hangers, bottles, and other repurposed materials that Rubel salvaged from the neighborhood as the old ranches and barns were giving way to tract houses.

To this day, chickens and other animals are frequently sighted on the grounds.

== Background ==
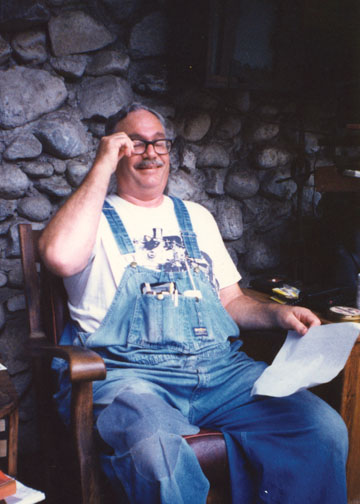
Michael Rubel on his porch, 2000.

In 1959, Rubel bargained for the defunct Albourne Rancho property and took up residence in the citrus packing house. Rubel's father, Henry "Heinz" Scott Rubel, had been an Episcopal priest and gag writer for Joe Penner, a radio comedian and movie star. In the 1960s, Rubel's mother, one-time Broadway actress and Greenwich Village Follies dancer Dorothy Deuel Rubel, moved into the packing house with her son. She used the venue to throw parties. Guests arrived weekly by the hundreds, arriving inside a tin fruit packing house which had been transformed into a giant dance hall. Inside, surrounded by art and antique furniture remaining from Rubel ancestors, they mingled and danced to a small orchestra. The parties led to the packing house becoming known as "The Tin Palace."

Notable people who visited "The Tin Palace" in that time include Sally Rand, Dwight Eisenhower, Vivian Duncan of the Duncan Sisters, Woody Strode, Beatrice Kay, Harry Townes, Bob Hope, Jack Benny, Kid Chissell, Angie Dickinson, and Alfred Hitchcock.

Fellow castle builder "Colonel" Jirayr Zorthian was a supporter and friend involved in the project.

== Construction of the castle ==
Though Rubel slept in one of the giant citrus refrigerators, the walls of thick cork were not sufficient sound insulation to allow him peace from his mother's parties. Beginning in 1968, Rubel began building a small get-away house in the empty 548,884.709 liters (120,737.757 imp gal; 145,000.000 U.S. gal) concrete reservoir, using cement and discarded champagne bottles. The walls of the reservoir provided privacy and a noise barrier while he built the bottle house. The project lasted 20 years, culminating in what is now called the Rubel Castle.

Beginning in 1968, with the help of his friends and close family, the castle grew to be thousands of square feet with towers five stories high. Rubel and his associates built the structure without architectural plans, using salvaged river rock, cement, steel, aluminum, telephone poles and wine bottles. Old motorcycles, tires, sand-filled rubber gloves, a camera, a golf club and a toaster are some of the items that protrude from the castle walls.

A restored 1911 Seth Thomas clock works runs the brass bells and clock that crown one of the high towers, which is 74 feet (23 m) high. In the middle of the property sits a 1940s-era Santa Fe caboose, as well as old trucks and tractors. There is also a cemetery with rejected marble tombstones, but it contains no graves.

== Legacy ==
Huell Howser interviewed Rubel for Videolog in 1990 and, after Michael's death, his nephew Scott, in 2011.

The castle has hosted royalty including Prince Philip. Some other notable guests have been former president Dwight D. Eisenhower, Henry Kissinger, the Archbishop of Canterbury Robert Runcie, and Governor George Deukmejian.

In March 2005, Rubel donated the Castle to the Glendora Historical Society.

Many television programs, music videos, and movies have been filmed on castle grounds, including NBC's Heroes, Our Flag Means Death, and a Frankenstein commercial by T-mobile.

Rubel Castle was added to the National Register of Historic Places in 2013.

== Gallery ==
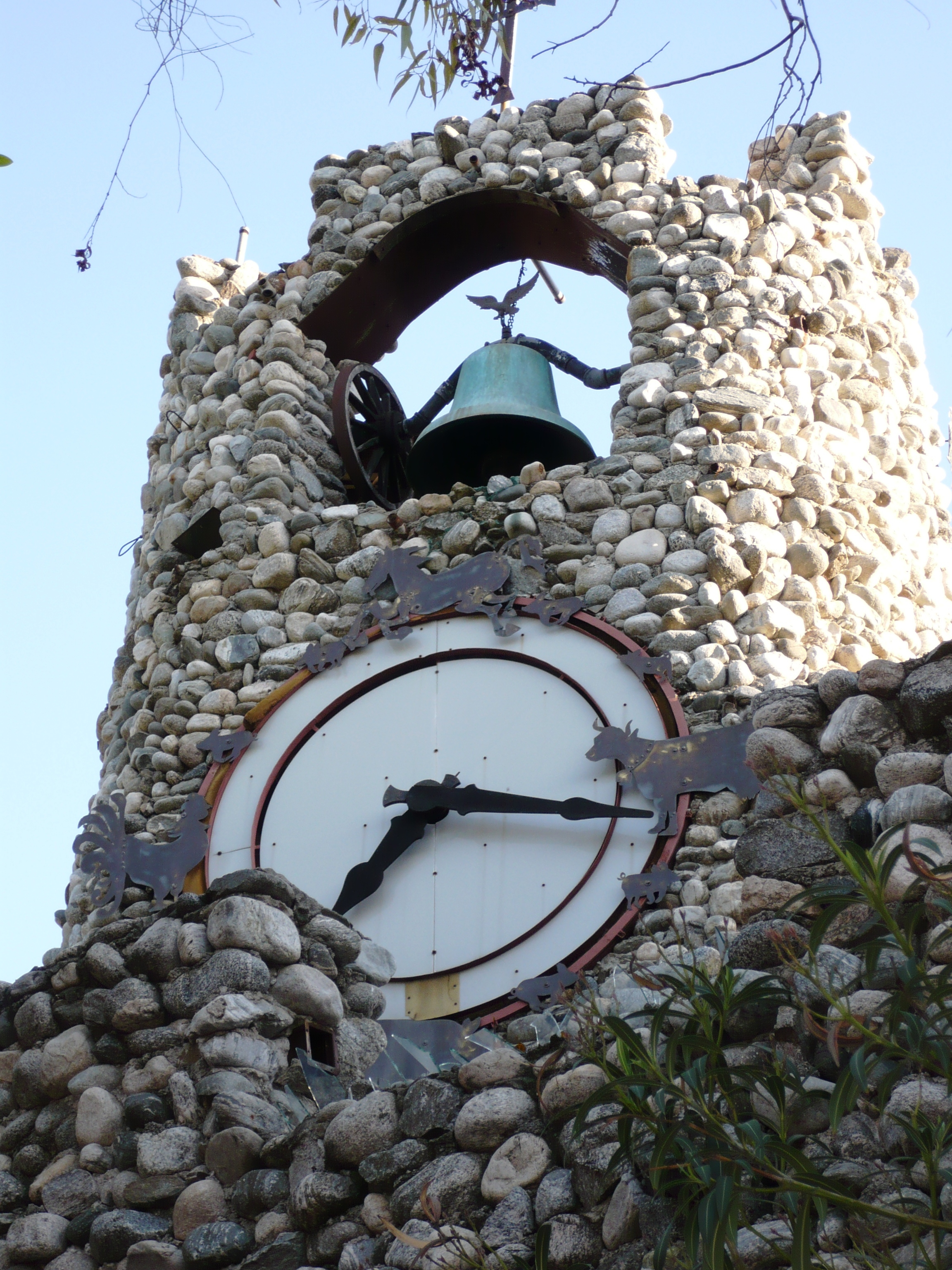
Clock Tower

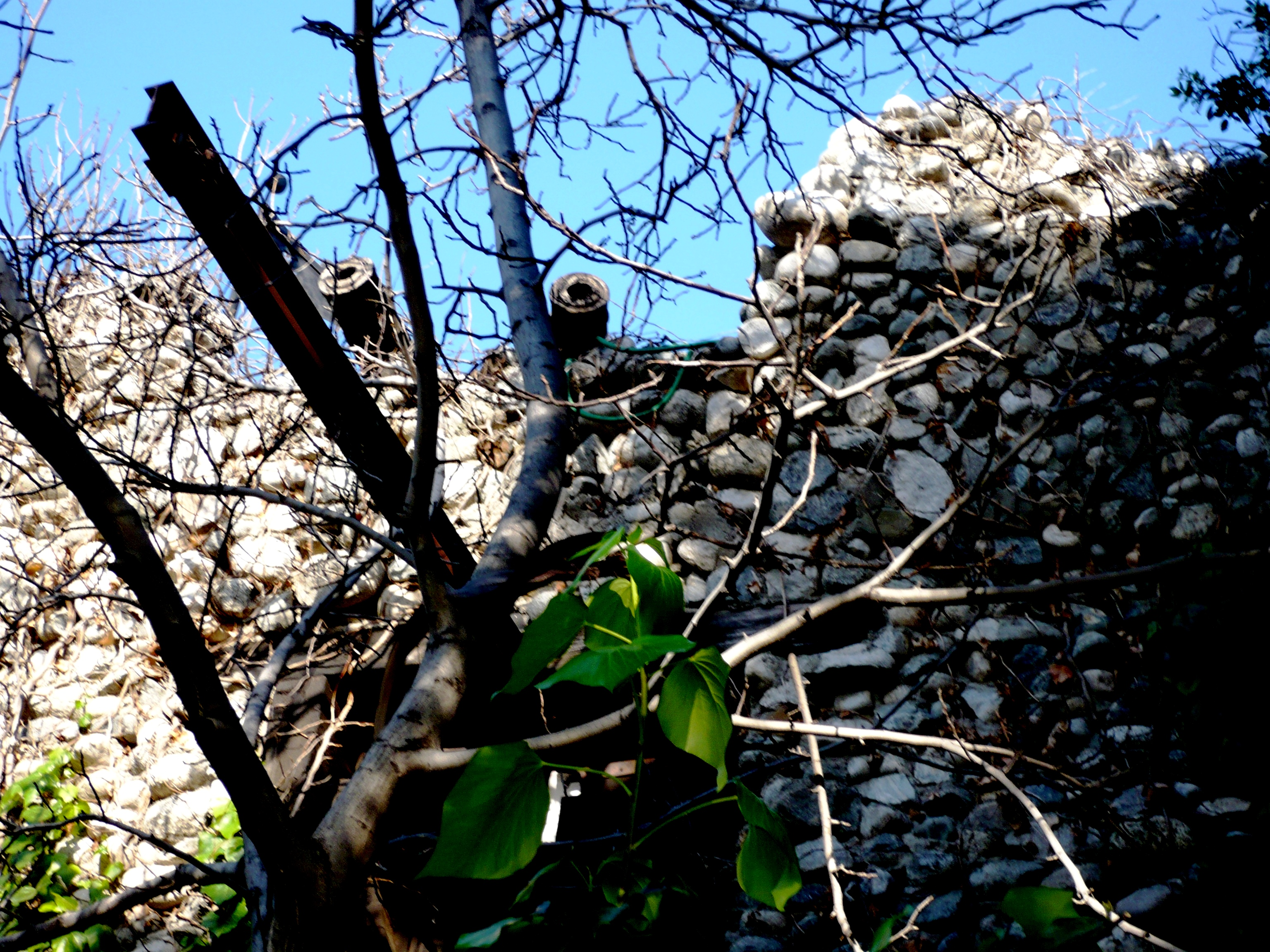
Cannons

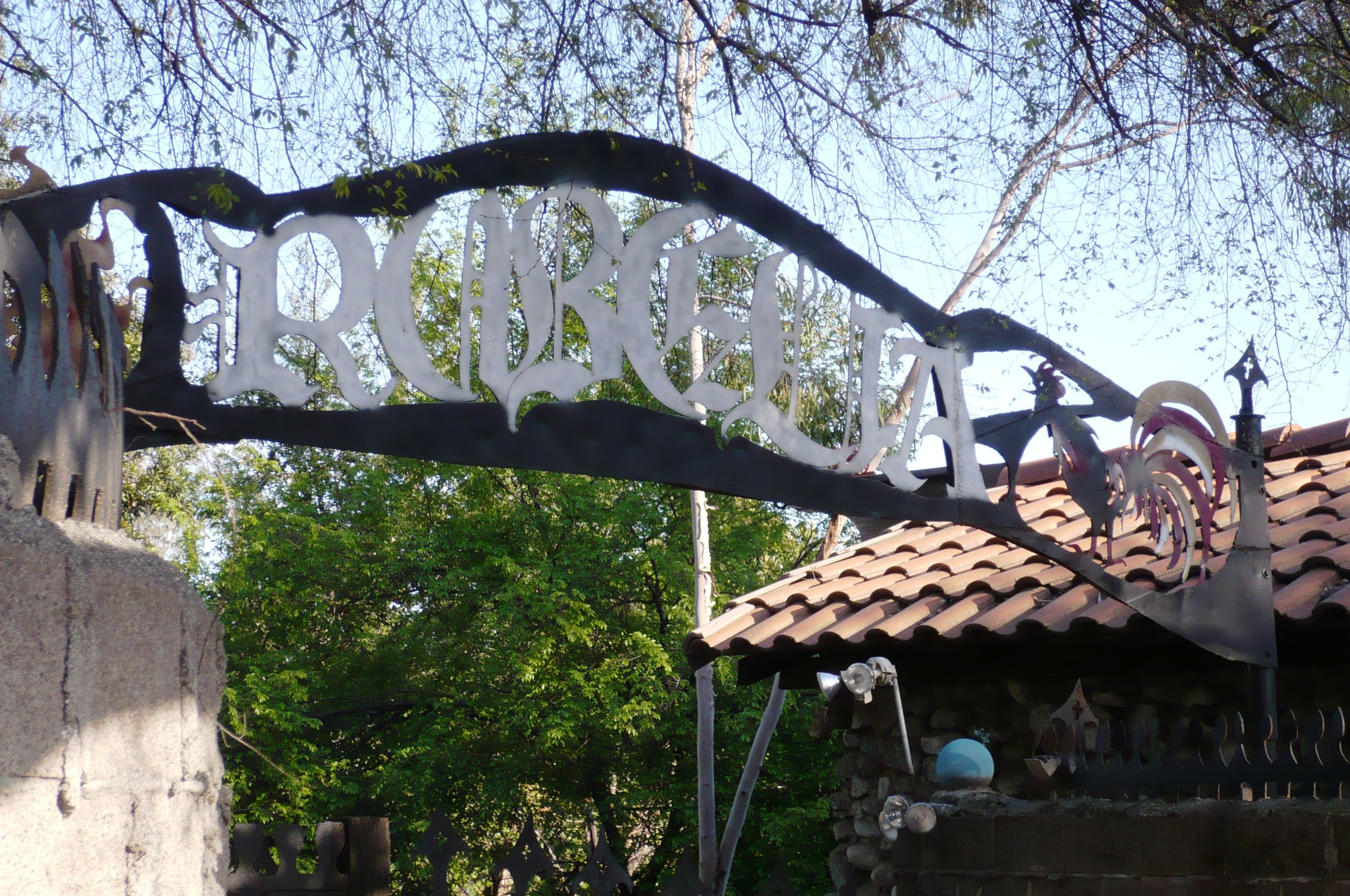
Entrance to Rubelia

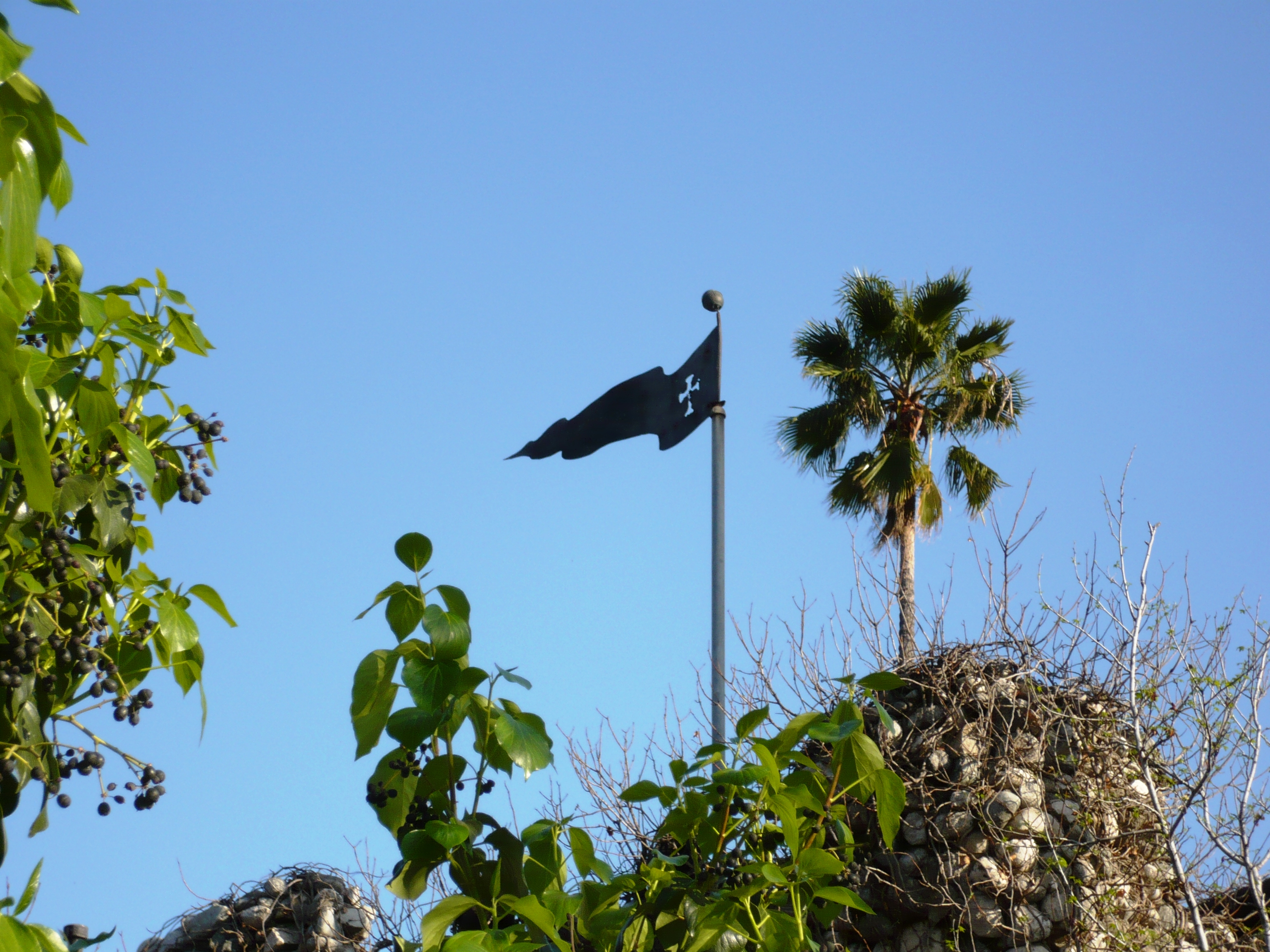
Flag

== See also ==
- Antoni Gaudí, a Catalan architect with a similar style, particularly the Sagrada Família in Barcelona.
- Hermit House, a unique residence located in Herzliya, Israel with intricate mosaics constructed by one man over thirty years.
- Mystery Castle, a house in Phoenix, Arizona built in the 1930s in a similar style.
- Nitt Witt Ridge, a house in Cambria, California constructed in a similar style.
- Ferdinand Cheval, a French postman who constructed an "ideal palace" out of rocks in his spare time.
- Grandma Prisbrey's Bottle Village, another folk art environment built with recycled materials.
- Watts Towers, a famous landmark in Los Angeles built from concrete and discarded materials.
- Lummis House, a historic home built out of river rocks and concrete known as El Alisal, also in Los Angeles County.
- Abbey San Encino, a unique river rock house and tribute to letterpress printing, built in Highland Park, Los Angeles by Clyde Browne (printer), grandfather of songwriter Jackson Browne.
