= HFN =

HFN may refer to:

- Hertford North railway station, in England
- Herzog, Fox & Ne'eman, an Israeli law firm
- Hornafjörður Airport, serving Höfn, Iceland
- Huu-ay-aht First Nations, based on Vancouver Island, Canada
