= John Hendrickson (businessman) =

American businessman

John T. Hendrickson is an American businessman, the chairman, president and chief executive officer (CEO) of Perrigo, since April 2016, when he succeeded Joseph C. Papa.

Hendrickson received bachelor's degrees in Chemistry from Hope College, and in Chemical Engineering from the University of Michigan, and an MBA from the University of Notre Dame.
