= Clyde Browne =

Clyde Browne may refer to:

- Clyde Browne (footballer) (born 1953), Guyanese footballer
- Clyde Browne (printer) (1872–1942), American printer associated with the Arroyo culture

== See also ==
- Clyde Brown (1926–1965), Canadian politician
