= Kirklees Stadium =

Multi-use stadium in Huddersfield, West Yorkshire, England

Coordinates: 53°39′15″N 1°46′06″W

- Accu Stadium
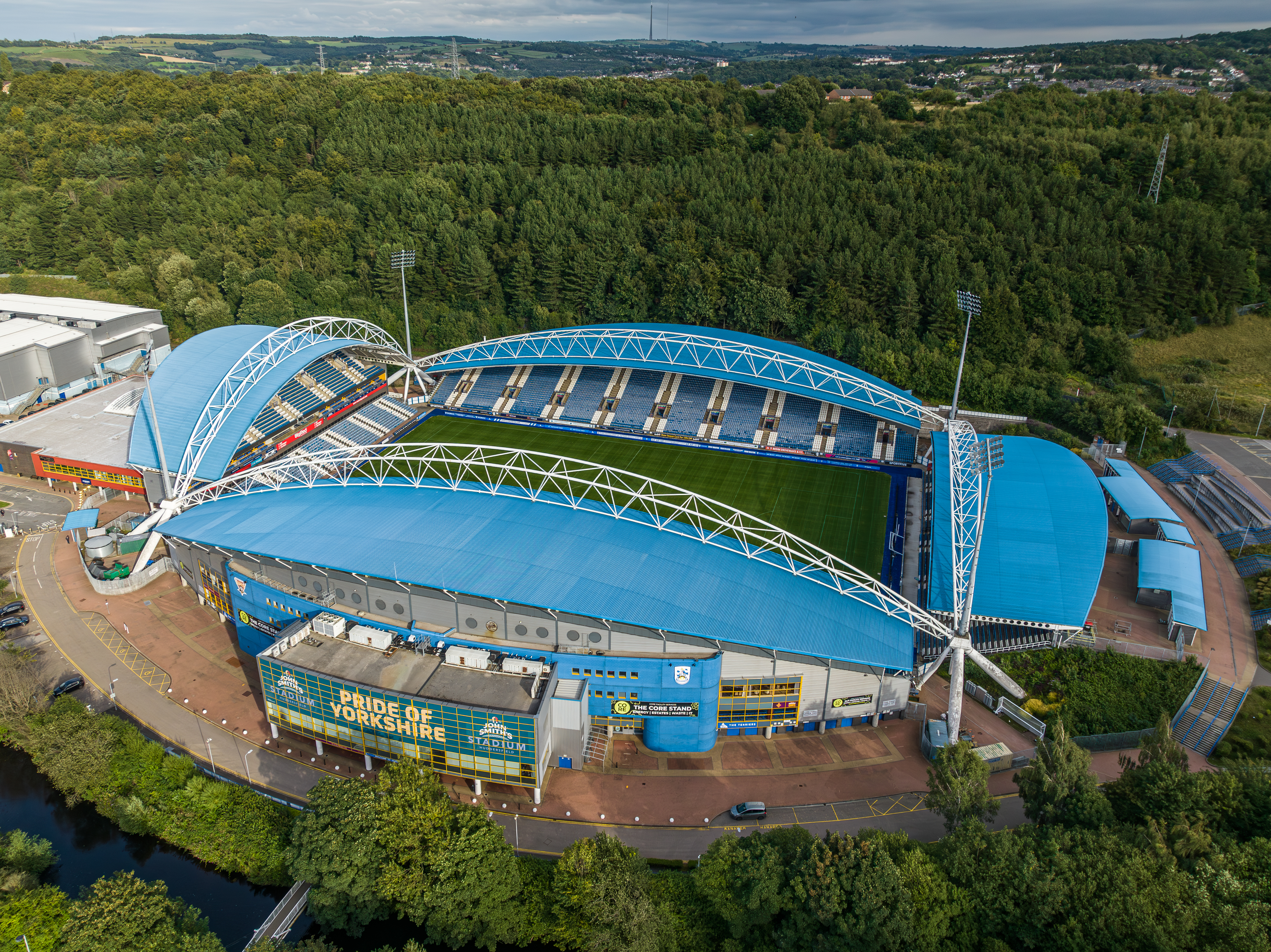
- Interactive map of Kirklees Stadium
- Former names: Alfred McAlpine Stadium (1994–2004); Galpharm Stadium (2004–2012); John Smith's Stadium (2012–2025)
- Location: Stadium Way; Huddersfield HD1 6PG; West Yorkshire; England
- Owner: Huddersfield Town
- Operator: KSDL (Kirklees Stadium Development Ltd.)
- Capacity: 24,121
- Surface: Grass with under-soil heating
- Record attendance: 24,375 (rugby league); 24,263 (football)
- Field size: 105 m × 69 m (344 ft × 226 ft)

Construction
- Built: 1994
- Opened: 1994
- Architect: Populous
- Builder: Alfred McAlpine

Tenants
- Huddersfield Town (1994–present); Huddersfield Giants (1994–2026)

Website
- www.accustadium.com

Kirklees Stadium, currently known as the Accu Stadium for sponsorship reasons, is a multi-purpose stadium in Huddersfield, West Yorkshire, England. With a capacity of 24,121, it has been the home ground of Huddersfield Town Association Football Club and previously home to Huddersfield Giants Rugby League Club, both of whom moved from Leeds Road in 1994 following a 2-year groundshare arrangement. The Giants left the stadium and moved to Flair Stadium in 2026.

The stadium was a venue for the Rugby League World Cup in 1995, 2000, 2013 and 2021, in addition to the 1999 Rugby World Cup. Since 25th September 2025 it is owned solely by Huddersfield Town Football Club who are the Stadium's only occupiers after both the Huddersfield Giants and Kirklees Council both relinqushed ownership and tenancy. Its naming rights have passed from constructors Alfred McAlpine to pharmaceutical company Galpharm International in 2004, then to John Smith's Brewery in 2012, and Accu in 2025.

== Stadium ==
During planning and construction, the stadium was referred to as the Kirklees Stadium which is still its official name. It was built by Alfred McAlpine, designed by Populous and was awarded the RIBA Building of the Year award for 1995.

The decision to build a new stadium for Huddersfield Town and Huddersfield Giants was made in August 1992. Construction began the following year and it was completed in time for the 1994–95 season, enabling the clubs to move to their new base after 86 years at Leeds Road and 114 years at Fartown respectively, with the Rugby club sharing Leeds Road from 1992 to 1994.

When the stadium opened only the two side stands (the Riverside and Kilner Bank stands) were ready. The South Stand was opened in December 1994. Construction on the North (Panasonic) Stand began in 1996 and it was completed in 1998, bringing the overall capacity of the stadium to approximately 24,500. The estimated cost of construction was £40 million.

A ski slope was planned to be built next to the stadium.

=== Ownership ===
Initially, the stadium was owned by a consortium made up of Kirklees Metropolitan Council, Huddersfield Town A.F.C. and Huddersfield Giants in a 40:40:20 proportion. Following the purchase of Huddersfield Town A.F.C. from the administrators in 2003, Ken Davy became chairman of both sports clubs, which were owned by companies he controls, Sporting Pride. . On 24 December 2009, Huddersfield Town announced that 40% of the shares owned by Huddersfield Sporting Pride would be transferred to the football club, owned by then Town chairman Dean Hoyle, but the deal was delayed due to a rent dispute between Davy and Hoyle. The deal was finally completed on 3 September 2013.

On 25 September 2025, the football club agreed a deal with Kirklees Council and the Giants to secure full ownership of the stadium and the surrounding 53-acre site with immediate effect, signing a 300-year leasehold. Huddersfield Giants announced plans to depart the stadium after 32 years for Flair Stadium in Dewsbury after the conclusion of the 2026 Super League season.

=== Sponsorship ===
From 1994 until 2004 the stadium was known as the Alfred McAlpine Stadium. Alfred McAlpine had been the main construction contractor and its name was part of the payment contract for ten years. The company elected not to renew its sponsorship which was taken up by Galpharm Healthcare, leading to the new name. Individual stands are sponsored by local businesses. On 19 July 2012, it was announced that the brewery firm, Heineken had bought the sponsorship rights for the stadium using their domestic John Smith's Brewery as the beneficiary, and as such the stadium was renamed as The John Smith's Stadium on 1 August as part of a five-year deal. In December 2016, this was extended for a further five years. In 2025, e-commerce engineering component platform Accu bought the naming rights.

== Layout ==
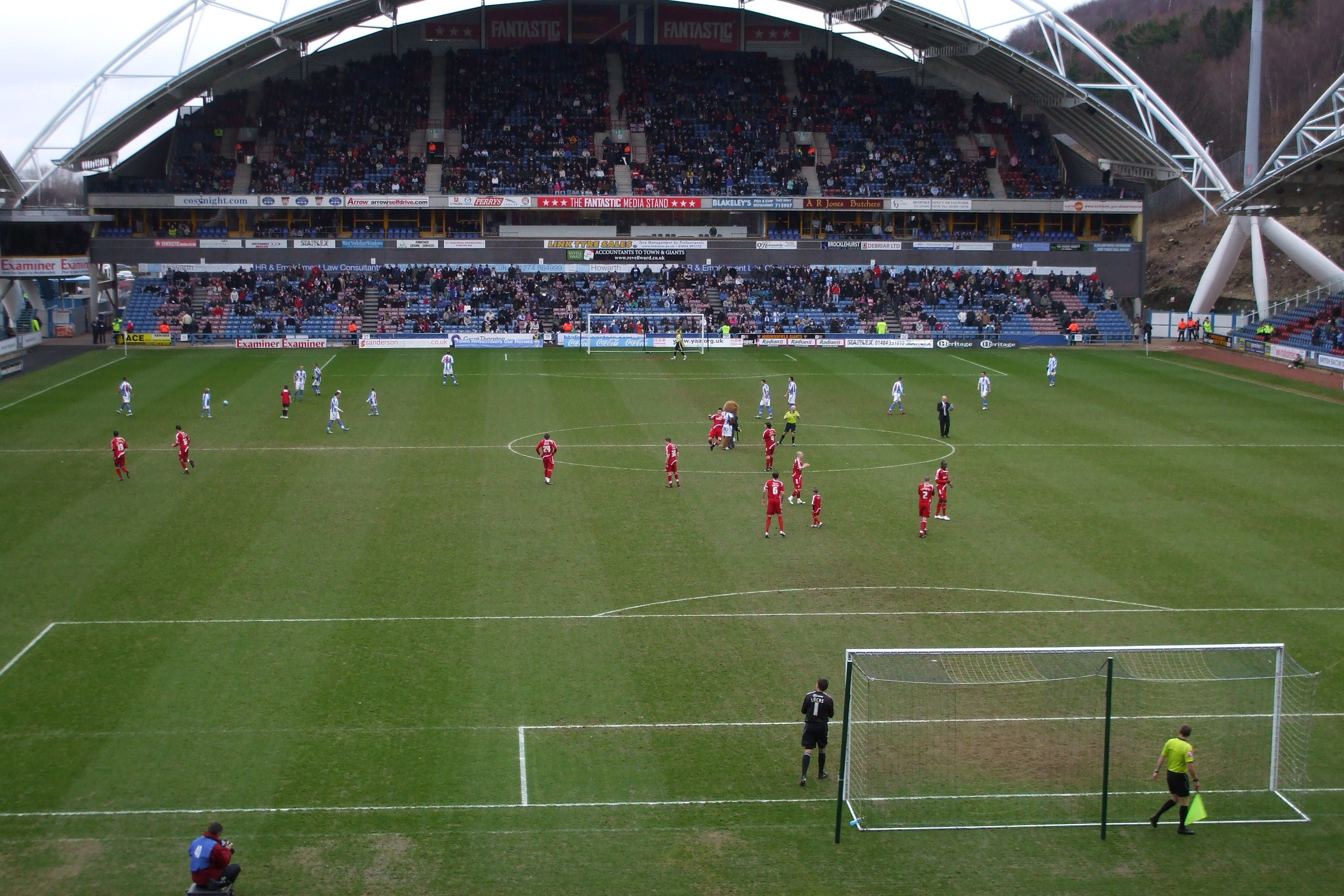
A match against Swindon Town in February 2010

=== North Stand ===
Capacity – 4,700 (seating)
The North Stand, known as the Big Red Stand for sponsorship reasons, is located behind the goal post at the north end of the ground. It has two tiers and houses 16 hospitality boxes and is completely seated. The lower tier contains temporary seats that can be removed for concerts or other events.

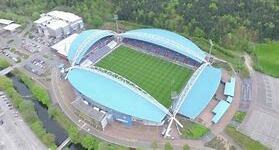
An aerial view of the stadium with the Riverside (bottom) and Kilner Bank (top)

=== East Stand (Kilner Bank) ===
Capacity – 7,000 (seating)
The East Stand known as the Kilner Bank Stand is a large single tier stand that runs along the side of the pitch and is completely covered seating. The stand also holds the TV gantry. It gets its name from the fact the stand is built under and partly into the large hill named Kilner Bank behind it.

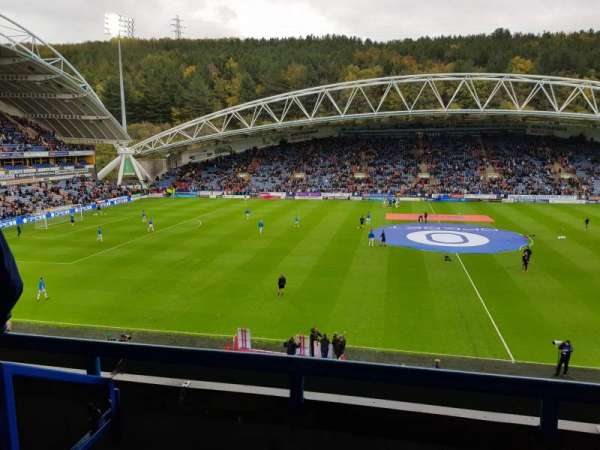
A view of the East stand with the Kilner Bank in the background

=== South Stand ===
Capacity – 4,054 (seating)
The Magic Rock Brewing Stand, as it is known for sponsorship reasons, is an all-seated stand built into a bank and is completely covered as well as having the big screen. The stand is generally the away stand for visiting fans in both football and rugby, for football, it used to be completely for away fans but it is now shared with home fans with segregation netting. From 2017 to 2018 a new segregation system was implemented with away fans given 2,500 tickets instead of 2,000.

=== West Stand (Riverside) ===
Capacity – 10,365 (seating)
The West stand is the main stand and is known as the Core Stand for sponsorship or Riverside Stand. It has two tiers and 26 hospitality boxes and incorporates the player changing rooms, tunnel, dugout, ticket office and club shop. It takes its name from the River Colne that passes behind it, a footbridge crosses over the river to the car parks and estates behind the ground.

== Events ==
=== Football ===
It hosted its first match on 20 August 1994 when Huddersfield Town lost 1–0 to Wycombe Wanderers in the Second Division. Only the two touchline stands had been completed, and 13,334 spectators attended. Simon Garner scored the goal for the visitors.

On 4 June 1999, it hosted England under-21 in a 2000 UEFA European Under-21 Championship qualification Group 5 match against Sweden, a 3–0 win for England.

On 20 August 2017, it held its first Premier League game, with Huddersfield's Aaron Mooy scoring the only goal of a 1–0 win over Newcastle United in front of a crowd of 24,128.

The record for a football match is 24,263 for a Premier League match between Huddersfield Town and Liverpool on 20 October 2018.

=== Rugby League ===
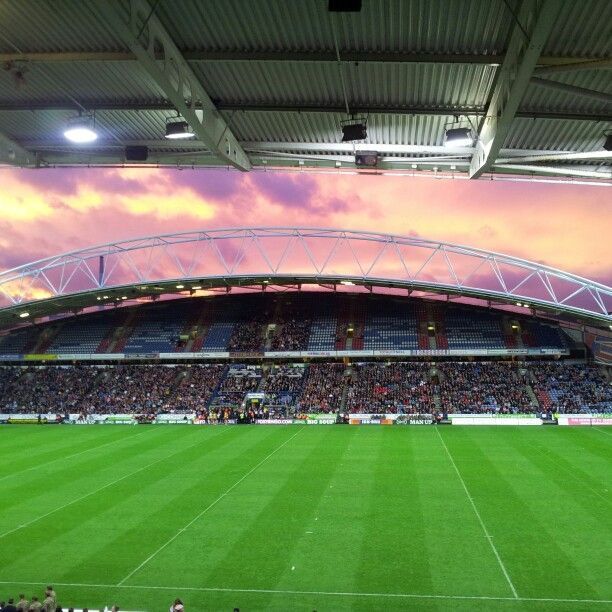
During a Huddersfield Giants game.

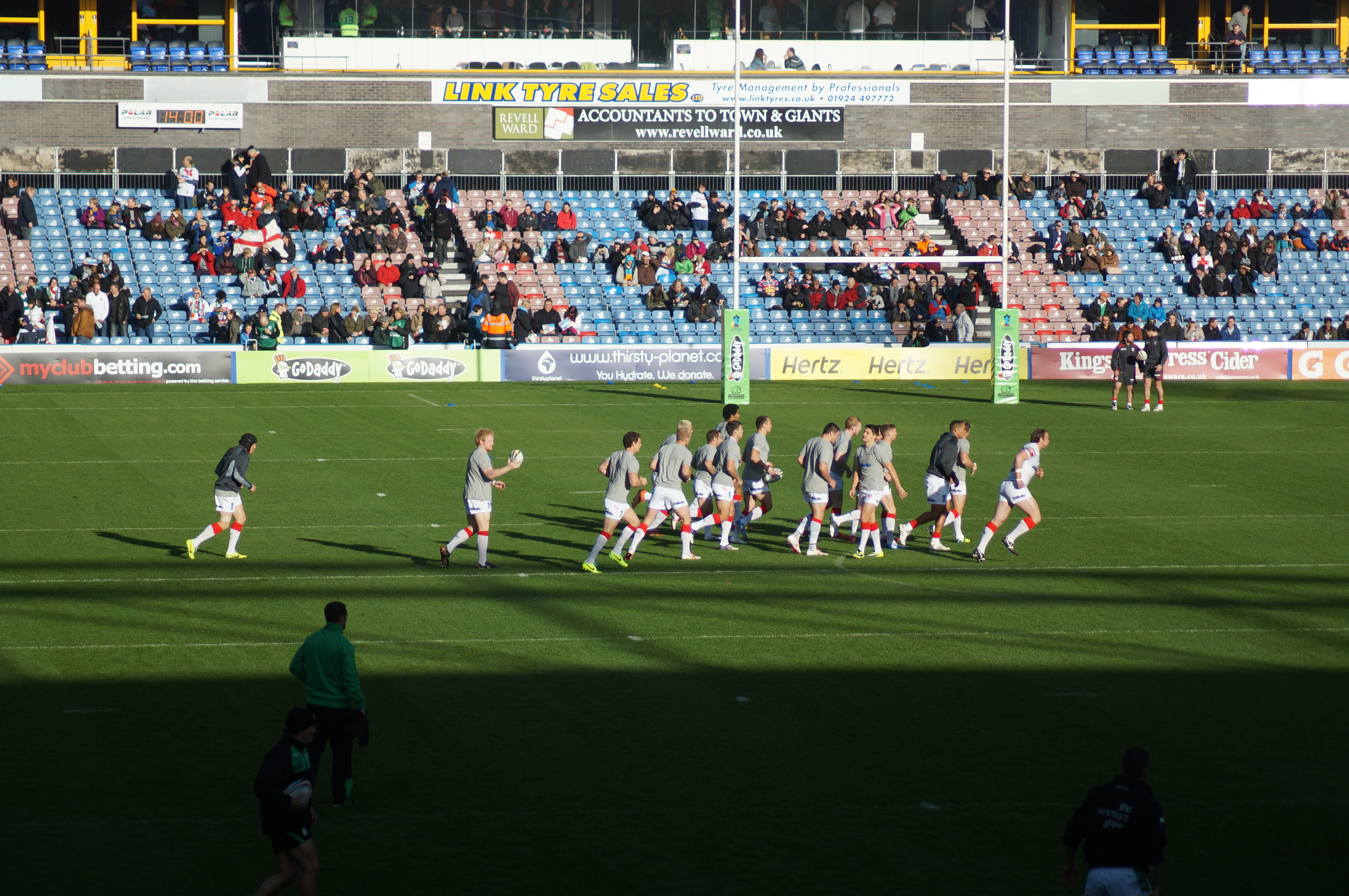
The England–Ireland game at the 2013 Rugby League World Cup set the stadium's attendance record

Rugby League World Cup matches were held at the stadium in 1995, 2000 and 2013. Seven Great Britain rugby league internationals have been held at the ground, from 1998 to 2007. Since the Great Britain team was split into home nations, it has hosted four England rugby league internationals, including a 42–0 win over Ireland in the group stage of the 2013 World Cup, in front of 24,375 spectators. It was the ground's first sell-out crowd, and its record attendance.

On 29 January 2019, it was announced that the John Smith's Stadium would play host to a quarter-final of the 2021 Rugby League World Cup.

The results of international matches are as follows;

Date	Winners	Result	Runners-up	Attendance	Part of
31 October 1998	Great Britain	22–16	New Zealand	18,500	1998 New Zealand tour of Great Britain
11 November 2001	Great Britain	20–12	Australia	21,458	2001 Ashes Series
16 November 2002	Great Britain	14–14	New Zealand	23,604	2002 New Zealand tour of Great Britain and France
22 November 2003	Australia	18–12	Great Britain	24,126	2003 Ashes Series
6 November 2004	Great Britain	22–12	New Zealand	20,372	2004 Tri-Nations
12 November 2005	Great Britain	38–12	New Zealand	19,232	2005 Tri-Nations
27 October 2007	Great Britain	20–14	New Zealand	16,522	2007 All Golds Tour
7 November 2009	England	20–12	New Zealand	19,390	2009 Four Nations
4 July 2012	Exiles RL	32–20	England	7,865	2012 International Origin series
2 November 2013	England	42–0	Ireland	24,375	2013 Rugby League World Cup
29 November 2016	New Zealand	17–16	England	24,070	2016 Four Nations
4 November 2022	Australia	48–4	Lebanon	8,206	2021 Rugby League World Cup Quarter Final
28 October 2023	England	14–4	Tonga	11,210	2023 Tonga Rugby League tour of England

The stadium has held semi-finals of the Challenge Cup and the finals of the now defunct Regal Trophy competition were held there in 1995 and 1996. Wigan Warriors won on both occasions. The stadium has also hosted three of Bradford Bulls' World Club Challenge matches, from 2002 to 2006. The Huddersfield Giants attendance record at the venue stands at 15,629 for a match against rivals Leeds Rhinos on 10 February 2008.

=== Rugby Union ===
Despite Huddersfield not being a strong rugby union area, the stadium has been used for four full cap international rugby union matches. It hosted three qualifying matches for the 1999 Rugby World Cup and one match in the pool. Two of the matches saw teams pass 100 points: England beat the Netherlands 110–0 in a qualifier and New Zealand defeated Italy 101–3 in the pool.

=== Concerts ===
The first concerts at the stadium were on 25 and 26 July 1995 by American band R.E.M., attended by around 80,000 people and providing a £3 million boom to local businesses. The Eagles, Bryan Adams and the Beautiful South also performed there in the 1990s, followed four years later by Bon Jovi in June 2001.

After three years with no performances, Blue played at the stadium on 31 July 2004 with Girls Aloud and Darius supporting, in an event to reveal Galpharm's new sponsorship of the venue. The following two summers, Elton John and Lulu in 2005, and Bryan Adams again in 2006, performed. After a gap of twelve years, Little Mix were booked to perform in July 2018 followed by Take That in June 2019. Green Day, Weezer and Fall Out Boy appeared in June 2022 after the concert was postponed by two years due to the COVID-19 pandemic. Muse performed at the stadium in June 2023 as part of their Will of the People World Tour.
