= Perrigo =

Irish tax-registered pharmaceutical

Perrigo Company plc

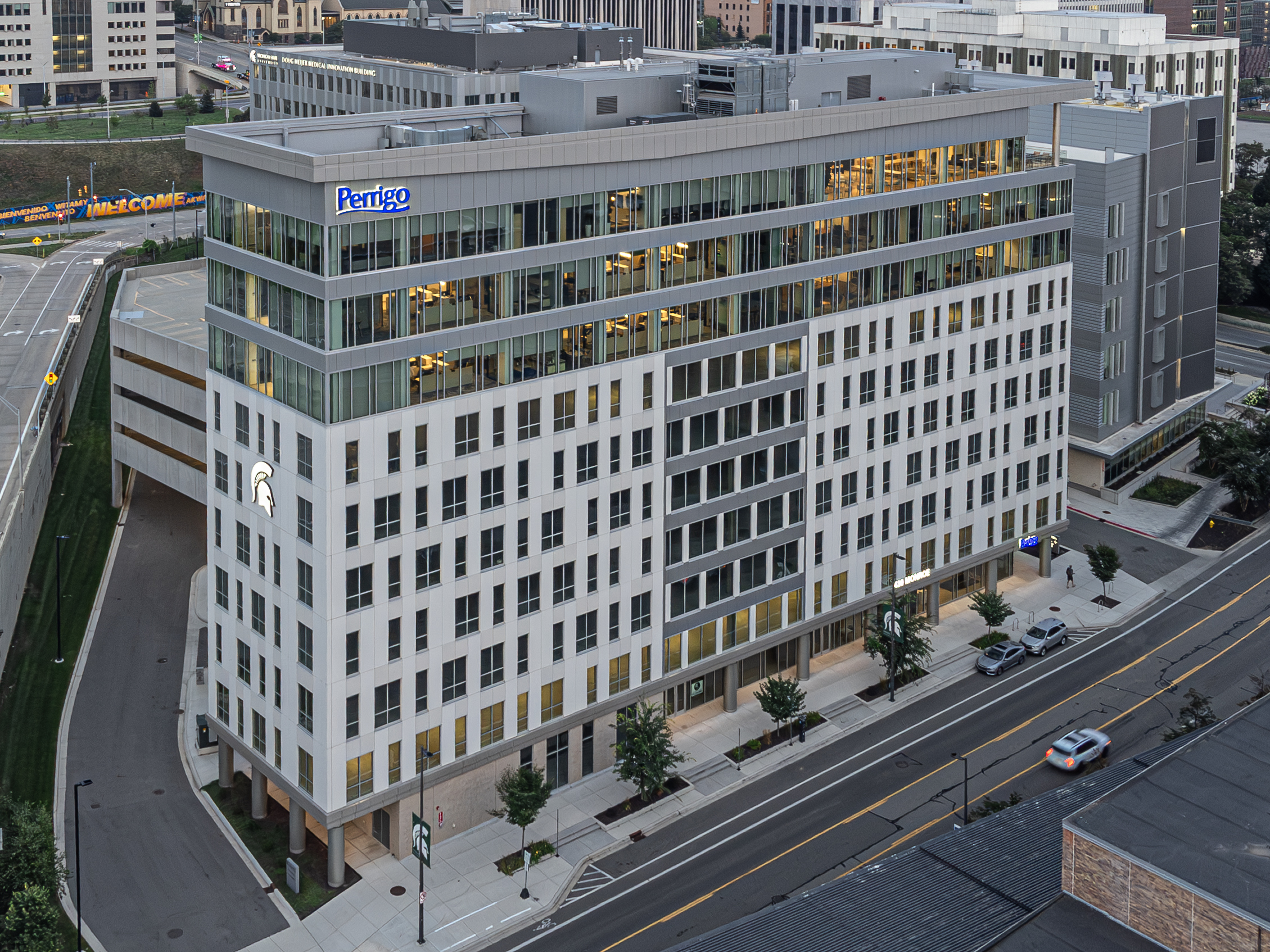
- Headquarters of Perrigo in Grand Rapids, Michigan
- Formerly: Perrigo Inc. (before the 2013 tax inversion to Ireland)
- Type: Public
- Traded as: NYSE: PRGO; S&P 600 component
- ISIN: IE00BGH1M568
- Industry: Pharmaceutical
- Founded: 1887; 139 years ago as L. Perrigo Company in Allegan, Michigan, U.S.
- Founders: Luther and Charles Perrigo
- Headquarters: Dublin, Ireland (legal); Grand Rapids, Michigan, U.S. (operational)
- Key people: Patrick Lockwood-Taylor (President and CEO)
- Products: OTC; RX; API; Medical Diagnostics; Pharmaceuticals
- Revenue: ▼US$4.37 billion (2024)
- Operating income: ▼US$113 million (2024)
- Net income: ▼US$−172 million (2024)
- Total assets: ▼US$9.65 billion (2024)
- Total equity: ▼US$4.32 billion (2024)
- Number of employees: 8,379 (2024)
- Subsidiaries: Omega Pharma
- Website: perrigo.com

Perrigo Company plc is an American Irish-registered manufacturer of private label over-the-counter pharmaceuticals, and while 70% of Perrigo's net sales are from the U.S. healthcare system, Perrigo is legally headquartered in Ireland for tax purposes, which accounts for 0.60% of net sales. In 2013, Perrigo completed the sixth-largest US corporate tax inversion in history when it reregistered its tax status to Ireland to avoid U.S. corporate taxes. Perrigo maintains its corporate headquarters in Grand Rapids, Michigan, within Michigan State University's Grand Rapids Innovation Park.

Perrigo engages in the acquisition (for repricing), manufacture, and sale of consumer healthcare products, generic prescription drugs, and active pharmaceutical ingredients (APIs), primarily in the United States, from its base in Ireland. On 21 December 2018, Perrigo suffered its biggest one-day share price fall in its history after the Irish Revenue Commissioners issued a tax claim against Perrigo that equated to half of its market value.

== History ==
L. Perrigo Company was founded in 1887 in Allegan, Michigan, by Luther and Charles Perrigo, who ran a general store.

In 1991 Perrigo had an initial public offering on Nasdaq.

In March 2005 the firm acquired Agis Industries Limited (traded as AGIS at the Tel Aviv Stock Exchange), an Israel-based generic pharmaceuticals company in an $850 million transaction. Agis was founded in 1983 by Mori Arkin, who developed his father's small drug import business into a multinational generic pharmaceutical company. As a result of the acquisition, Arkin owned 9% of Perrigo, and was appointed as Vice Chairman of the company.

In July 2013, Perrigo announced that it would execute a corporate tax inversion to Ireland in order to avoid U.S. corporate taxes, via an $8.6 billion acquisition of Irish-based Elan Corporation. As of November 2018, Perrigo is the sixth-largest U.S. tax inversion in history. Over 70% of Perrigo's sales, and an even greater percentage of Perrigo profits, are from the U.S. healthcare system.

In April 2015, Perrigo received an unsolicited buy-out offer from Mylan of $29 billion, which was ultimately rejected by management and shareholders. In May 2016, Perrigo investors sued the company over statements made during the Mylan bid, which were said to have persuaded shareholders to vote against the deal. In the months prior to this suit, the company's chairman and CEO, Joseph Papa, who has been credited with "fending off" Mylan's bid, left to take the CEO role at Valeant. Upon Papa's departure, John Hendrickson, who was at the time the company's president, took on the additional roles of chairman and CEO. Hendrickson was succeeded by Uwe Roehrhoff in January, 2018. Murray S. Kessler succeeded Roehroff already in October of that same year. As of July 2023, Patrick Lockwood-Taylor is the current President and CEO.

On 20 December 2018, the Financial Times reported that the Irish Revenue Commissioners levied a €1.64 billion (not including penalties and interest) Irish tax claim on Perrigo for unpaid capital gains tax (CGT) from the 2013 sale of Tysabri to Biogen by Elan, which happened months before Perrigo's acquisition of Elan. The claim is the second largest ever issued by the Revenue Commissioners in Irish history, after Apple's €13 billion Irish tax fine. On 21 December 2018, the Irish Times reported that Revenue claimed Perrigo owed CGT at a rate of 33% as an "asset sale", however Perrigo claimed that the sale was part of Elan's normal "trading income", and was subject to the lower 12.5% Irish corporate tax rate, which Perrigo was able to reduce to 0% using Ireland's multinational tax BEPS tools.

In June 2022, Perrigo moved its corporate headquarters from Allegan to downtown Grand Rapids, about 40 miles north, within Michigan State University's Grand Rapids Innovation Park. The company still maintains offices and production at the Allegan campus.

In 2023, its subsidiary, HRA Pharma, received approval from the FDA to sell an over the counter women’s contraception drug called Opill.

=== Acquisitions ===
On 9 January 2008, the firm acquired Galpharm Healthcare, Ltd., a supplier of over-the-counter store brand pharmaceuticals in the United Kingdom. On 16 September 2008, the firm acquired J.B. Laboratories. On 6 October 2008, it acquired Laboratorios Diba S.A., enabling the company to market its products in Mexico. On 13 November 2008, it acquired Unico Holdings, a manufacturer of store brand pediatric electrolytes, enemas and feminine hygiene products for retail consumers in the U.S.

On 1 March 2010, the firm acquired Orion Laboratories Pty, Ltd., a supplier of over-the-counter (OTC) store brand pharmaceutical products in Australia and New Zealand. On 23 March 2010, it acquired PBM Holdings, Inc., a producer of over-the-counter store brand infant formula and baby foods in the United States, Canada, Mexico and China.

On 20 January 2011, the firm announced that it would acquire Paddock Laboratories Inc., with the deal expected to close in fiscal 2012.

In September 2012, Perrigo announced its intention to enter the animal wellness category by acquiring the assets of Sergeant's Pet Care Products, Inc., a privately held manufacturer of over-the-counter companion animal healthcare products.

On 11 February 2013, Perrigo announced the completion of the acquisition of Rosemont Pharmaceuticals Ltd., a specialty and generic prescription pharmaceutical company focused on the manufacturing and marketing of oral liquid formulations.

On 29 July 2013, the firm announced that it would acquire Élan, a pharmaceutical firm based in Dublin. The Élan acquisition enabled Perrigo to reincorporate as an Irish company using Élan's headquarters (although the executive offices remained in Allegan), lowering its effective tax rate (called a tax inversion).

In November 2014, Perrigo announced it had agreed to buy Belgian health-products provider Omega Pharma for approximately $4.5 billion (€3.6 billion). The transaction was completed in March 2015.

In August 2016, the company announced it would acquire United States-based national distributor of over-the-counter medicines, Geiss, Destin & Dunn.

In May 2019, Perrigo announced it would acquire Ranir Global Holdings LLC, boosting its oral self-care offering, with the transaction valued at $750 million.

In February 2020, announced that it has reached an agreement to acquire the oral care assets of High Ridge Brands for $113 million.

In March 2021, Perrigo confirmed it would sell off its generics business to Altaris Capital Partners for $1.55 billion. In September, the business announced it would acquire HRA Pharma from investment firms Astorg and Goldman Sachs Asset Management for $2.1 billion, and completed the acquisition in April 2022.

=== Acquisition history ===
The following is an illustration of the company's major mergers and acquisitions and historical predecessors (this is not a comprehensive list):

- Perrigo (Founded as L. Perrigo Company, 1887)
  - Agis Industries Ltd (Acq 2005)
  - Galpharm International (Acq 2008)
  - J.B. Laboratories (Acq 2008)
  - Laboratorios Diba S.A. (Acq 2008)
  - Unico Holdings (Acq 2008)
  - Orion Laboratories Pty Ltd (Acq 2010)
  - PBM Holdings Inc (Acq 2010)
  - Paddock Laboratories Inc (Acq 2011)
  - Sergeant's Pet Care Products Inc (Acq 2012)
  - Rosemont Pharmaceuticals Ltd (Acq 2013)
  - Élan (Acq 2013)
  - Omega Pharma (Acq 2015)
  - Geiss, Destin & Dunn (Acq 2016)
  - Proteon Therapeutics (Acq 2016)
  - Ranir Global Holdings LLC (Acq 2019)
  - HRA Pharma (Héra SAS) (Acq 2022)

== Segments ==
The company operates in three segments; Consumer Self-care Americas, Rx Pharmaceuticals, and Consumer Self-Care International. The Consumer Self-care Americas segment produces over-the-counter pharmaceutical and nutritional products in the United States and the United Kingdom. This segment offers analgesic, cough/cold/allergy/sinus, gastrointestinal, smoking cessation, first aid, antacids, hemorrhoidal remedies, motion sickness, sleep aid products, feminine hygiene products, vitamin, nutritional supplement products, and male pattern baldness remedies which are manufactured in Israel.

The Rx Pharmaceuticals segment produces generic prescription drugs in the United States. This segment provides creams, ointments, lotions, gels, and solutions, as well as nasal sprays, foams, and transdermal devices. Believing that Rx business has the potential to realize greater value outside of Perrigo, board okays separation of prescription pharma business on 9 August 2018.

The Consumer Self-Care International (CSCI) segment develops, manufactures, markets, and distributes well-known European self-care brands in the natural health and vitamins, cough, cold and allergy, oral care, smoking cessation, personal care and derma-therapeutics and lifestyle categories.
