= Michael Fox (lawyer) =

British-Israeli lawyer (1934-2009)

Michael Fox, MBE (Hebrew: מייקל פוקס; 8 March 1934 – 9 May 2009) was a British-Israeli lawyer. He was co-founder of Herzog, Fox & Neeman, Israel's largest law firm.

== Biography ==
Michael Fox was born in London, England, to Sam and Freda Fox. He studied law at the University of London (King's College London) and opened a private practice, Fox & Gibbons, in London, prior to his immigration to Israel in 1968. He lived in Herzliya Pituah. Fox was married to Sheila Israel, also an attorney. They had no children. He died in Jerusalem on 9 May 2009, after a decade-long battle with cancer.

== Legal and journalistic career ==
Fox was a member of the International Bar Association and the Law Society of England and Wales. He was an expert in corporate law, especially in mergers & acquisitions and infrastructure development. Fox worked closely with Isaac Herzog, now President of Israel, before leaving the firm in 2002. Herzog described Fox as "something between a father and a cousin" and "one of the people I love the most in this world."

Fox wrote a monthly column for the English edition of the Israeli newspaper Haaretz. A selection of his Haaretz columns was published as a book with an introduction by the English writer and his childhood friend John Gross.

He served as chairman of the Israel, Britain and the Commonwealth Association (IBCA).

== Honours ==
In 2003, Fox was made a Member of the Order of the British Empire (MBE) for his contribution to Israel–British relations.

== Published works ==
- Mountains and Molehills, Essays 2003–2007, Weill Publishers
