= Jirayr Zorthian =

American painter

- Born: April 14, 1911; Kütahya, Western Anatolia, Ottoman Empire
- Died: January 6, 2004 (aged 92)
- Known for: Painting
- Notable work: The Phantasmagoria of Military Intelligence Training

Jirayr Hamparzoom Zorthian (Armenian: Ժիրայր Զորթեան) (April 14, 1911 — January 6, 2004) was an Armenian American artist.

== Biography ==
=== Early life ===
Born of Armenian parents on April 14, 1911, in Kütahya, Western Anatolia, Ottoman Empire, Zorthian escaped through Europe with the remnants of his family to escape the Armenian genocide, and arrived in New Haven, Connecticut in 1923. He earned a Master of Fine Arts at Yale University (where he had a "full college scholarship to the Yale School of fine arts") and studied art in Italy in the 1930s. Returning to the United States during the Great Depression, he painted several massive murals, including 11 for the Tennessee State Capitol in 1938 which earned him the honorary title of "Colonel". In 1940, he painted the mural at the United States Post Office in St. Johnsville, New York, titled "Early St. Johnsville Pioneers."

=== World War II ===
During World War II, he first served in the 603rd Camouflage Engineer Battalion, a unit including many New York City area artists that eventually became part of the famed Ghost Army. The following year he was transferred (still stateside) to army intelligence and painted what he came to consider his masterpiece—a mural he titled The Phantasmagoria of Military Intelligence Training. His training at Camp Ritchie makes him one of many Ritchie Boys. His first marriage, to shaving cream heiress Betty Williams, ended in divorce but he gained the first acres of the Altadena ranch where he lived from 1945 until his death.

=== Friendship with Richard Feynman ===
Zorthian is known among physicists for his friendship with Richard Feynman, a Nobel Prize winning physicist. They met at a party where Feynman played bongos: Zorthian removed his shirt and made funny designs on his own chest with available materials. Zorthian and Feynman's attempts to teach each other physics and art respectively are described in Feynman's autobiography Surely You're Joking, Mr. Feynman!. Zorthian's teaching inspired Feynman to take up drawing, a pastime he continued for the rest of his life.

== Zorthian's work ==
Zorthian, who earned his own kaleidoscopic descriptives as the last bohemian, a rustic latter-day Henri de Toulouse-Lautrec or an ongoing work of performance art, died on January 6, 2004, of congestive heart failure. The nonagenarian's paintings, primarily of nude women that he said expressed "every man's fantasy," sold for tens of thousands of dollars.

For Zorthian ... the beautiful human body was ... not merely an object but a potent means of communication for any and all ideas, as well as a source of inspiration and aesthetic delight In a very real sense, his nudes are autobiographical, telling more about him than his subjects.

But Zorthian was perhaps better known in Southern California art circles for his free-form lifestyle than for his prodigious art. Each spring during the last decade of his life he threw a primavera birthday party, dubbing himself Zor-Bacchus, wearing a toga over long red underwear, and nibbling grapes from the hands of nude, garlanded nymphs (many of which were his artist models). Zorthian joined the nymphs in dancing to the pipes of a cavorting Pan garbed in furry goat leggings. Alcohol flowed freely and a roasted pig fed hundreds of guests who could include scientists, movie stars, internationally known artists, writers and musicians and ordinary people. July 15, 1952, Zorthian hosted a legendary party on his ranch, where Charlie Parker played, a woman performed a strip tease atop a rocking horse, and other riled-up guests tore their clothes off.

The diminutive Armenian-American was friends with jazzman Charlie Parker, artist Andy Warhol and Nobel Prize-winning physicist Richard Feynman.

The ranch served as a haven of bohemian life and a backdrop for items of Zorthian's artistic expression—salvaged wood, bed springs, rusted vehicles, broken concrete, beer bottles, old shoes and other junk he could recycle into various sculptures and architecture. Zorthian called the ranch The Center for Research and Development with an Emphasis on Aesthetics, and fashioned rental houses out of discarded items including telephone poles and railroad ties. He also built rock walls, towers, inlaid bridges and walkways. He painted in a studio and bred horses for his horse ring.

Zorthian and his wife, Dabney (March 21, 1933 – May 10, 2006), lived in a small pseudo-brick house on the ranch, well loved by friends as welcoming although very cluttered. The couple often preferred to sleep outdoors. They slaughtered their own livestock and made their own sausage, milked their own goats and made cheese, raised their own vegetables and gathered eggs from their chickens. As a young immigrant, Zorthian had been startled by how wasteful Americans seemed and vowed to recycle everything he could and to create his own self-sufficient environment, a trait he shared with rival/fellow castle-builder Michael Rubel.

Proudly, Zorthian offered his own down-to-earth appraisal of his art ranch for the Los Angeles Times in 1990: "This entire property has sort of been sculpted with a skip-loader. I have 40 more years of work. I don't have time to die. ... A lot of people my age have given up being curious or vital. Can you imagine me in a retirement home playing shuffleboard?"

Zorthian was equally at home attending posh art events in a tuxedo as in digging through restaurant trash cans for recyclable objects. He chaired the Pasadena Art Fair in 1954 and 1955 and staged a show of his work at what was then the Pasadena Art Museum in 1953.

Despite desperate attempts by its caretakers to save it, the Zorthian Ranch was destroyed by the Eaton Fire, in January 2025. The only buildings not destroyed were the two main houses. The archive containing the majority of Jirayr Zorthian's artwork burned down. Alan Zorthian's son made attempts to save some of Jirayr Zorthian's paintings by moving them to the house's basement, but the basement ended up being the only part of the house that did not survive, so those were destroyed as well.

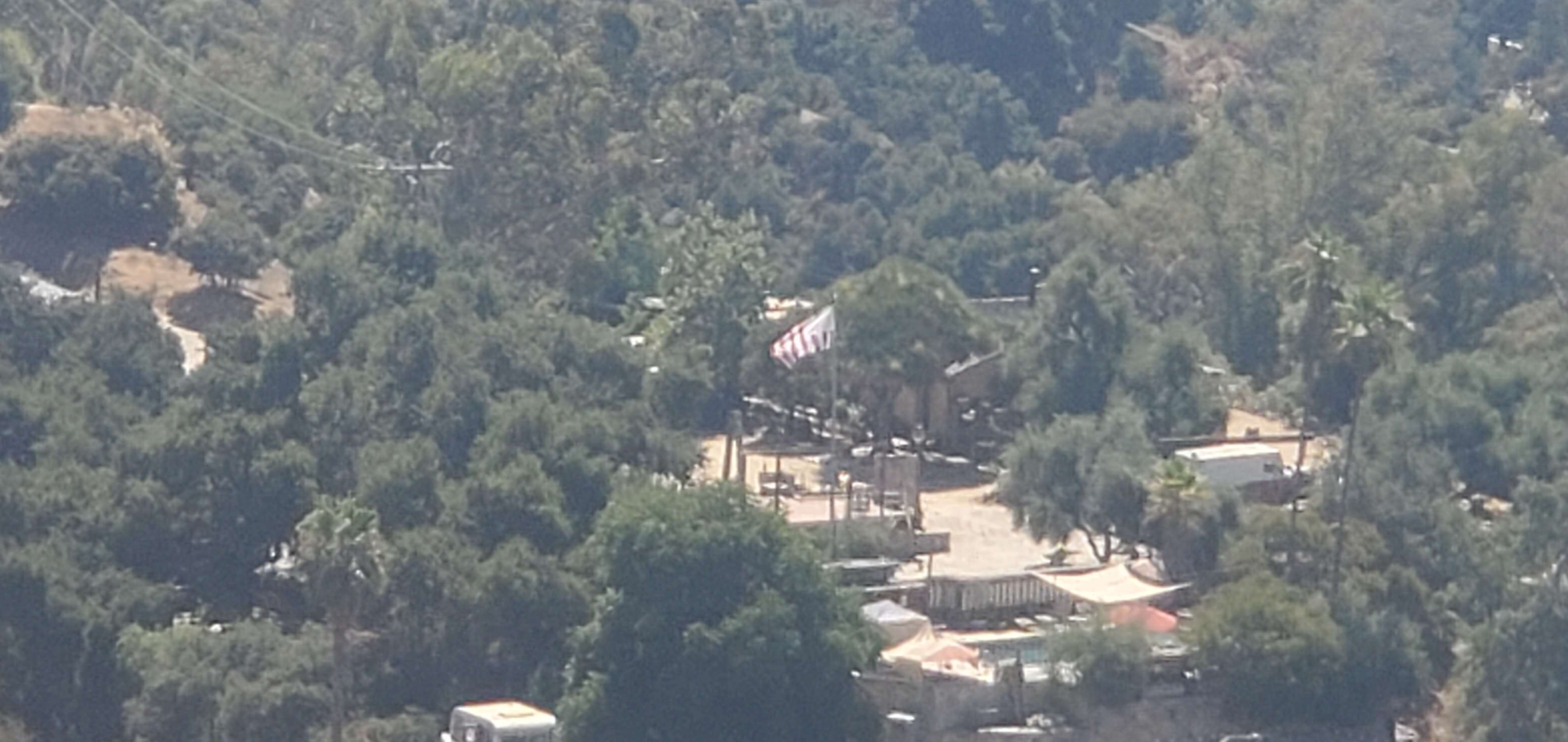
Zorthian Ranch as seen from the Sunset Ridge picnic area.
