= Mori Arkin =

Israeli billionaire businessman

- מורי ארקין
- Born: October 23, 1952 (age 74)
- Education: Tel Aviv University
- Occupation: Businessperson
- Spouse: Doris
- Children: 3

Moshe "Mori" Arkin (Hebrew: משה "מורי" ארקין; born October 23, 1952) is an Israeli billionaire businessman and investor, the founder and chairman of Arkin Capital.

== Early life ==
Arkin was born in Ramat Gan in 1952, to Ziama Arkin and Luba Arkin. Arkin's parents immigrated to Israel from Russia in 1932, and opened a pharmacy in Tel Aviv.

As a Russian speaker, Arkin served in Intelligence Unit 848 (later named Unit 8200), stationed in the Sinai Peninsula. His service included the Yom Kippur War.

Arkin began his undergraduate studies in Old Testament and archaeology at Tel Aviv University, then transferred to psychology and earned a BA with honors. He went on to graduate studies at Tel Aviv University in physiological psychology and philosophy of science.

== Career ==
In 1961, his father Ziama Arkin founded Agis (from Latin: activity), an Israeli pharmaceutical importer. Agis grew into a generic pharmaceutical manufacturer.

After his father’s death in 1972, Arkin, then a 19-year-old soldier, took over the company. Under his leadership, Agis grew into a generic pharmaceutical manufacturer listed on the Tel Aviv Stock Exchange.

In 2004, Agis was sold to the American pharmaceutical company Perrigo for $818 million.

Arkin is the founder and chairman of Arkin Holdings, a pharmaceutical company. He is the co-founder and chairman of the Accelmed Fund.

== Personal life ==
Arkin is married with three children, and lives in Herzliya Pituah, Israel.
