= Forestiere Underground Gardens =

- U.S. National Register of Historic Places
- California Historical Landmark
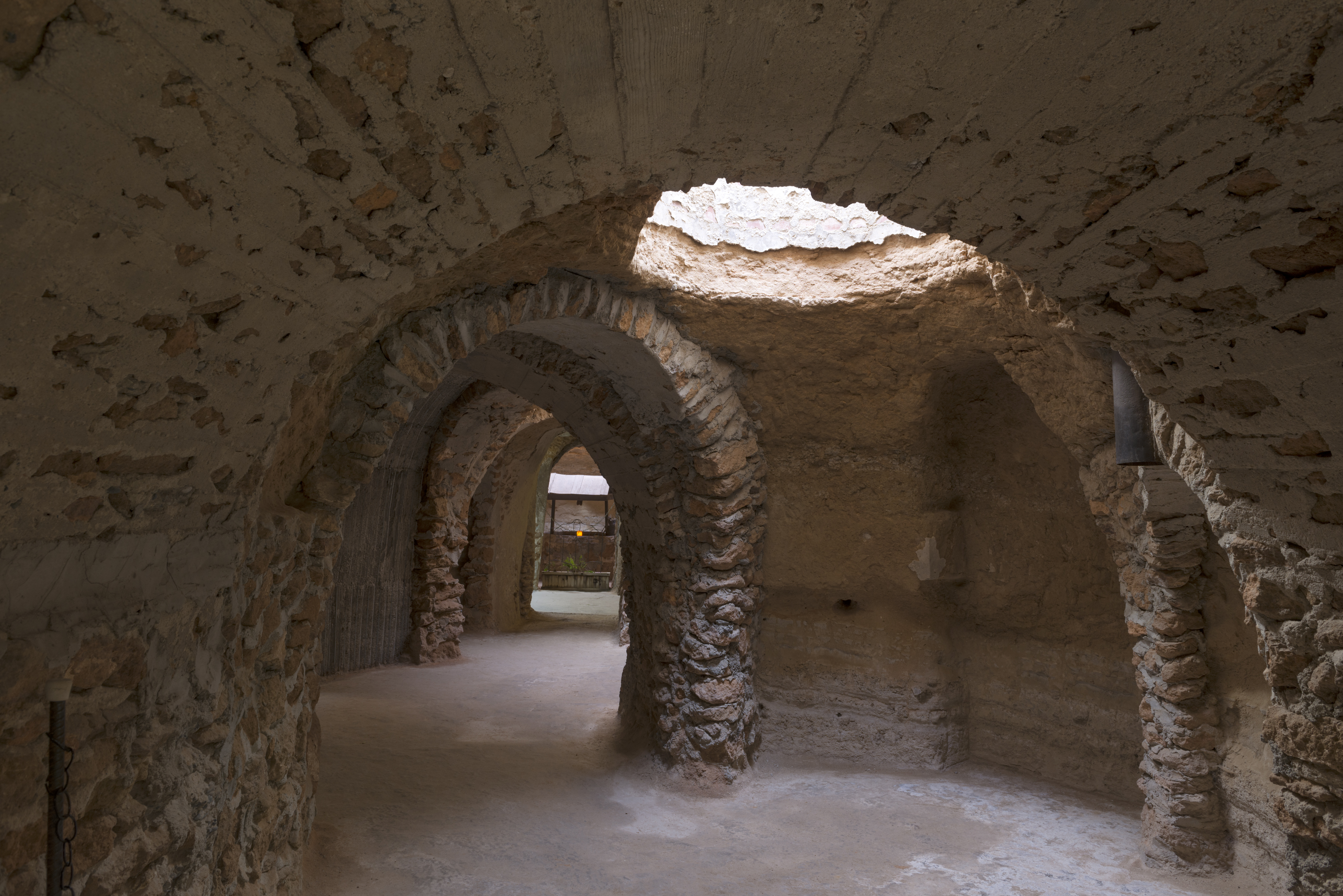

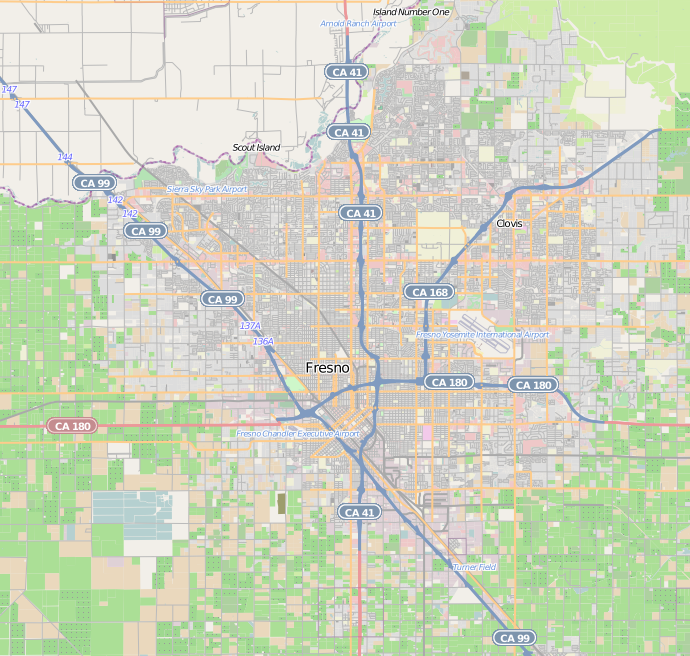
- Location within Fresno, California Location within California Location within the United States
- Location: Fresno, California
- Coordinates: 36°48′26″N 119°52′51″W
- Architect: Baldasare Forestiere
- NRHP reference No.: 77000293
- CHISL No.: 916
- Added to NRHP: October 28, 1977

The Forestiere Underground Gardens in Fresno, California, are a series of subterranean structures built by Baldassare Forestiere, an immigrant from Sicily, over a period of 40 years from 1906 to his death in 1946. The gardens are operated by members of the Forestiere family through the Forestiere Historical Center, and can be considered an unconventional example of vernacular architecture.

== History ==
Baldassare Forestiere (Italian pronunciation: [baldasˈsarre foreˈstjɛːre]; July 8, 1879 – November 10, 1946) was born in the hamlet of Filari, near Rometta on the northeastern tip of Sicily. He immigrated to the United States in the early 1900s after a conflict with his father, and after time on the East Coast purchased land in Fresno. He found the hardpan soil unsuitable for citrus trees, and the weather punishingly hot during the summer.

Forestiere dug a small cellar to escape the summer heat. He was likely influenced by Roman catacombs and wine cellars he had seen in Italy. Finding it effective and comfortable, he carved a series of attached rooms and took up residence there. Forestiere then began experimenting with growing trees in underground chambers with skylights, and found that with care they would grow well, and being below ground protected them from frost. Forestiere continued expanding and improving these underground gardens until his death in 1946, using hand tools and a pair of mules.

The gardens were listed on the National Register of Historic Places in 1977 and registered as No. 916 on the list of California Historical Landmarks in 1978.

== Design ==
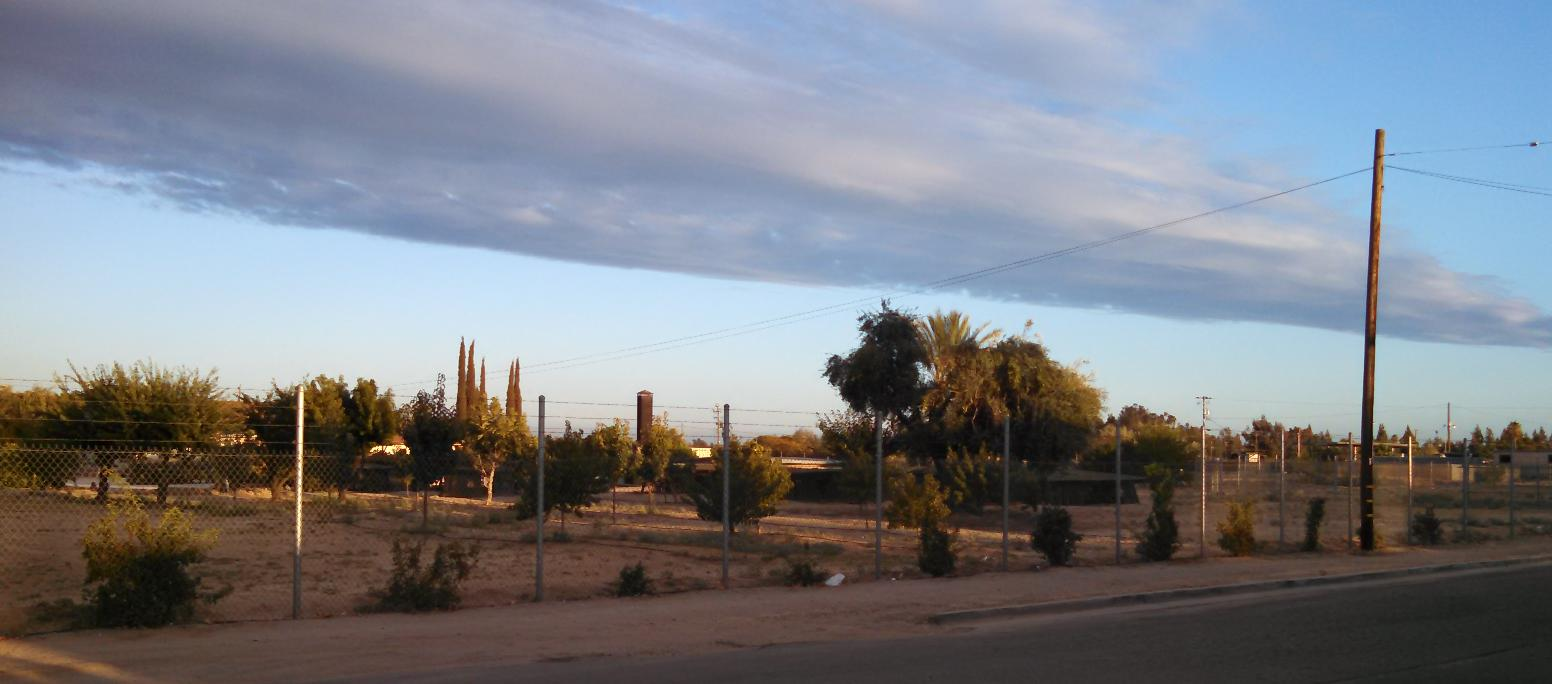
Another view from the street

There are 65 rooms in the Forestiere Underground Gardens. It has a summer bedroom, a winter bedroom, a bath, a functional kitchen, a fishpond, and a parlor with a fireplace. Interspersed amongst the stone walls and archways are grottoes and courtyards that allow for pockets of light. The intricate pathways were created section by section, over a span of 10 acres (4.0 ha), without the aid of blueprints. There are three levels within the underground structure, one 10 feet (3.0 m) deep, one 20 feet (6.1 m) deep, and one 23 feet (7.0 m) deep.

The gardens have skylights and catch basins for water. The dirt that was moved to create the large structure was used elsewhere to fill planters, create stones placed within the catacombs, and to level out other parts of the land. The hardpan he excavated was reused as bricks for archways and supports. The pathways and rooms were constructed with various widths to help direct airflow by creating pressure as it moves through narrower portions and maintain movement as it bounces off the slants and curves of the cavernous walls. The conical skylights allow for the hot air to be pushed out more quickly and the cool air to remain below.

The plants and trees, some of which are over 100 years old, are protected from the frost in the winter months by virtue of construction. Each level was planted at different times, so they bloom in succession, in order to lengthen the growing season. It houses a variety of fruit ranging from citrus and berries to exotic fruits like the kumquat, loquat, and jujube. The trees have been grafted to bear more than one kind of fruit, allowing for a larger variety to be grown throughout the space. Trees and vines were also planted above the dwelling, acting as insulation and forming canopies that provide protection from the elements.

== Depictions ==
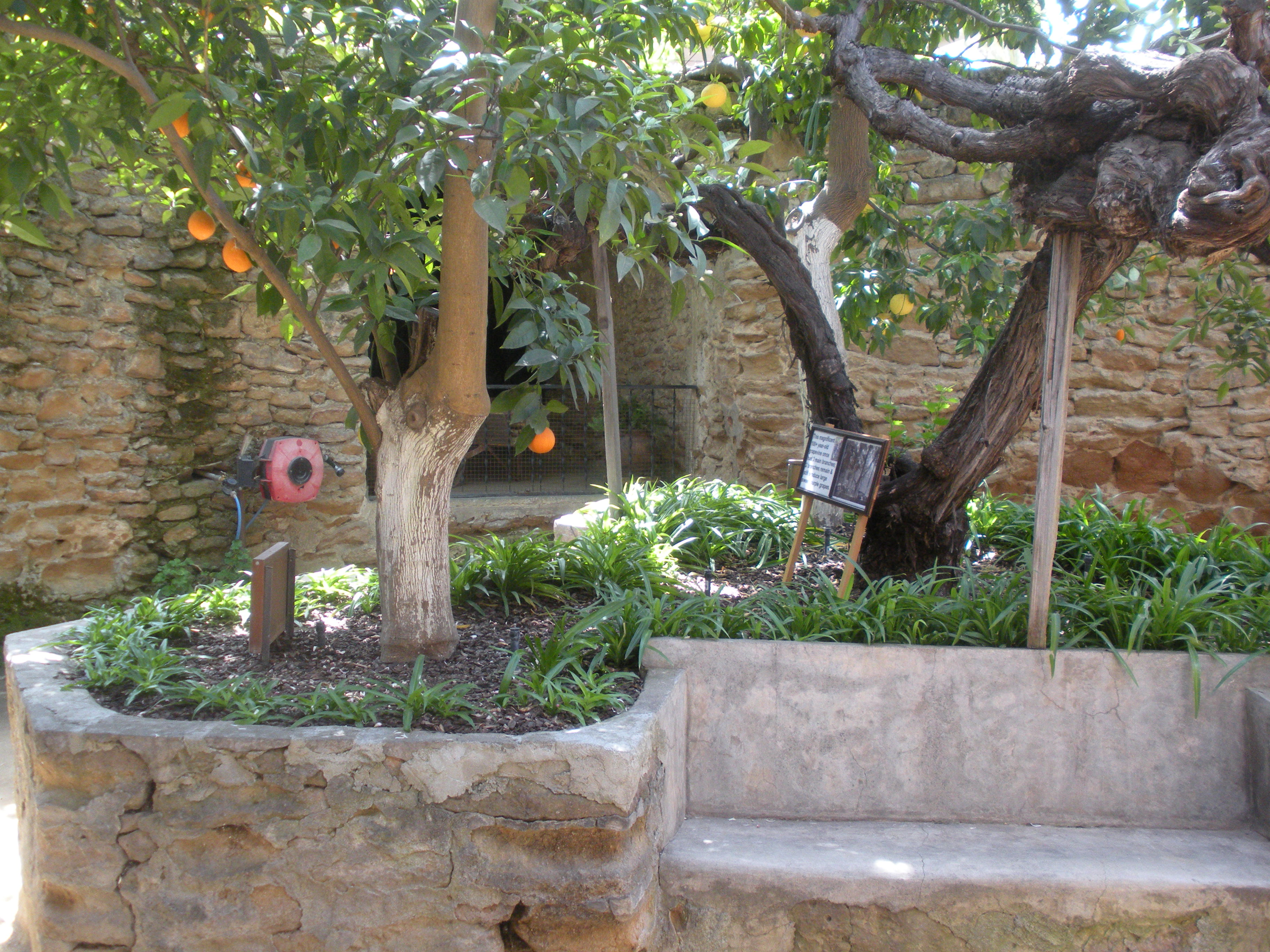
Citrus trees at the Forestiere Underground Gardens

T. Coraghessan Boyle wrote a fictionalized account of Forestiere, the short story "The Underground Gardens," which was published in The New Yorker in 1998.

== See also ==
- Burro Schmidt Tunnel is a 0.5 miles (0.80 km) mining tunnel dug with hand tools and dynamite over a 38-year period
- Ferdinand Cheval, a French postman who constructed an "ideal palace" out of rocks in his spare time.
- Hermit House, a residence located in Herzliya, Israel with mosaics constructed by one man over thirty years.
- House on the Rock Alex Jordan Jr. constructed "Japanese House" atop rock pinnacle in Spring Green, Wisconsin.
- Nitt Witt Ridge a house in Cambria, California constructed in a similar style.
- Watts Towers in Los Angeles, a collection of 17 interconnected structures, built by Italian immigrant Sabato Rodia.
- Hobby tunneling
