= United States Post Office (St. Johnsville, New York) =

- US Post Office-St. Johnsville
- U.S. National Register of Historic Places
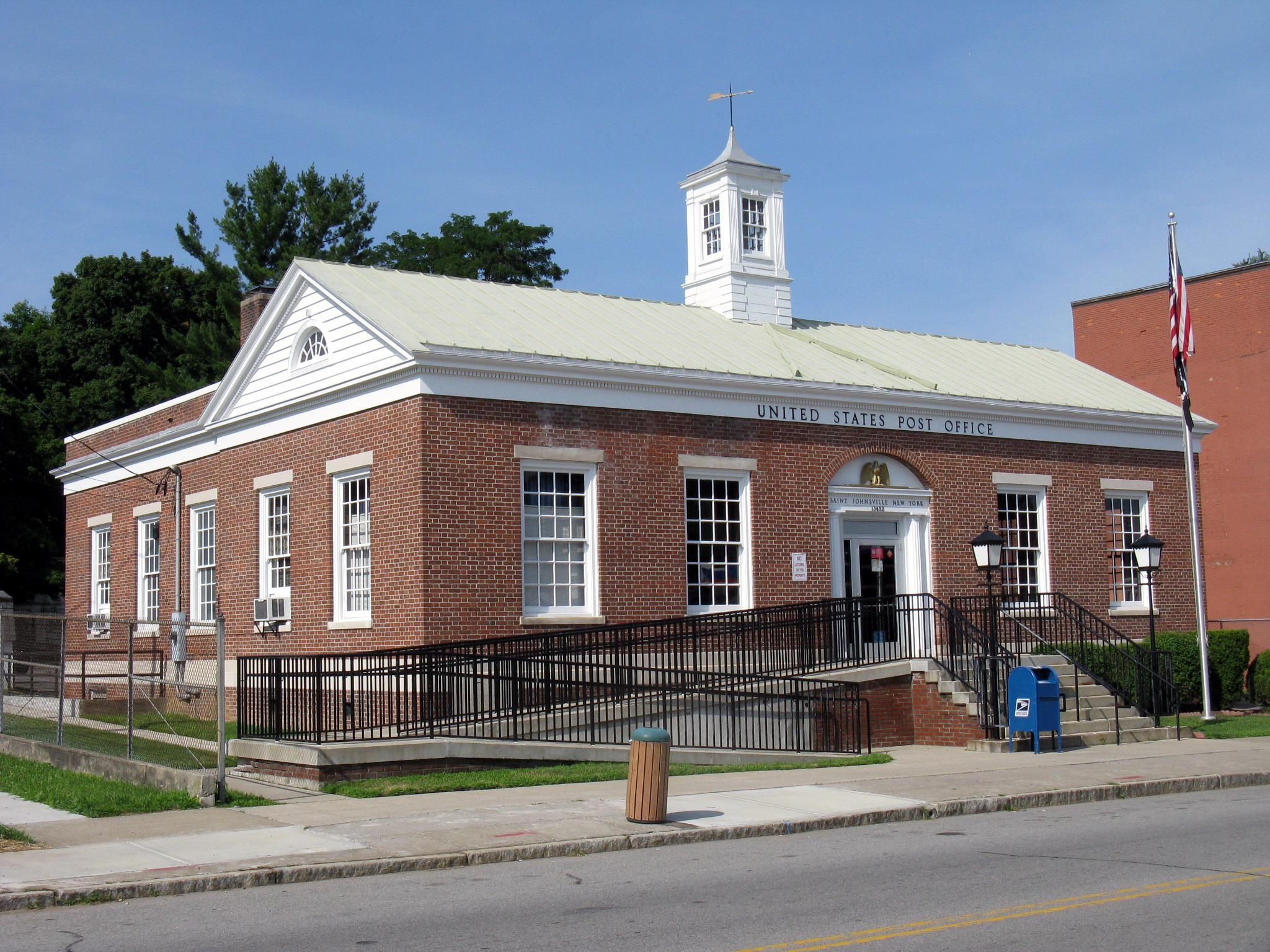
- U.S. Post Office, July 2010

- Location within New York Location within the United States
- Location: 15 E. Main St., St. Johnsville, New York
- Coordinates: 42°59′55″N 74°40′42″W
- Area: less than one acre
- Built: 1936
- Architect: Louis A. Simon, Jirayr H. Zorthian
- Architectural style: Colonial Revival
- MPS: US Post Offices in New York State, 1858-1943, TR
- NRHP reference No.: 88002434
- Added to NRHP: May 11, 1989

US Post Office-St. Johnsville is a historic post office building located at St. Johnsville in Montgomery County, New York, United States. It was built in 1936, and is one of a number of post offices in New York State designed by the Office of the Supervising Architect of the Treasury Department under Louis A. Simon. It is a one-story, symmetrical brick building on a stone watertable in the Colonial Revival style. It features a copper clad gable roof with a square, flat topped cupola with a weathervane. The interior features a 1940 mural by Jirayr H. Zorthian (1911-2004) titled "Early St. Johnsville Pioneers."

It was listed on the National Register of Historic Places in 1989.
