= Nitt Witt Ridge =

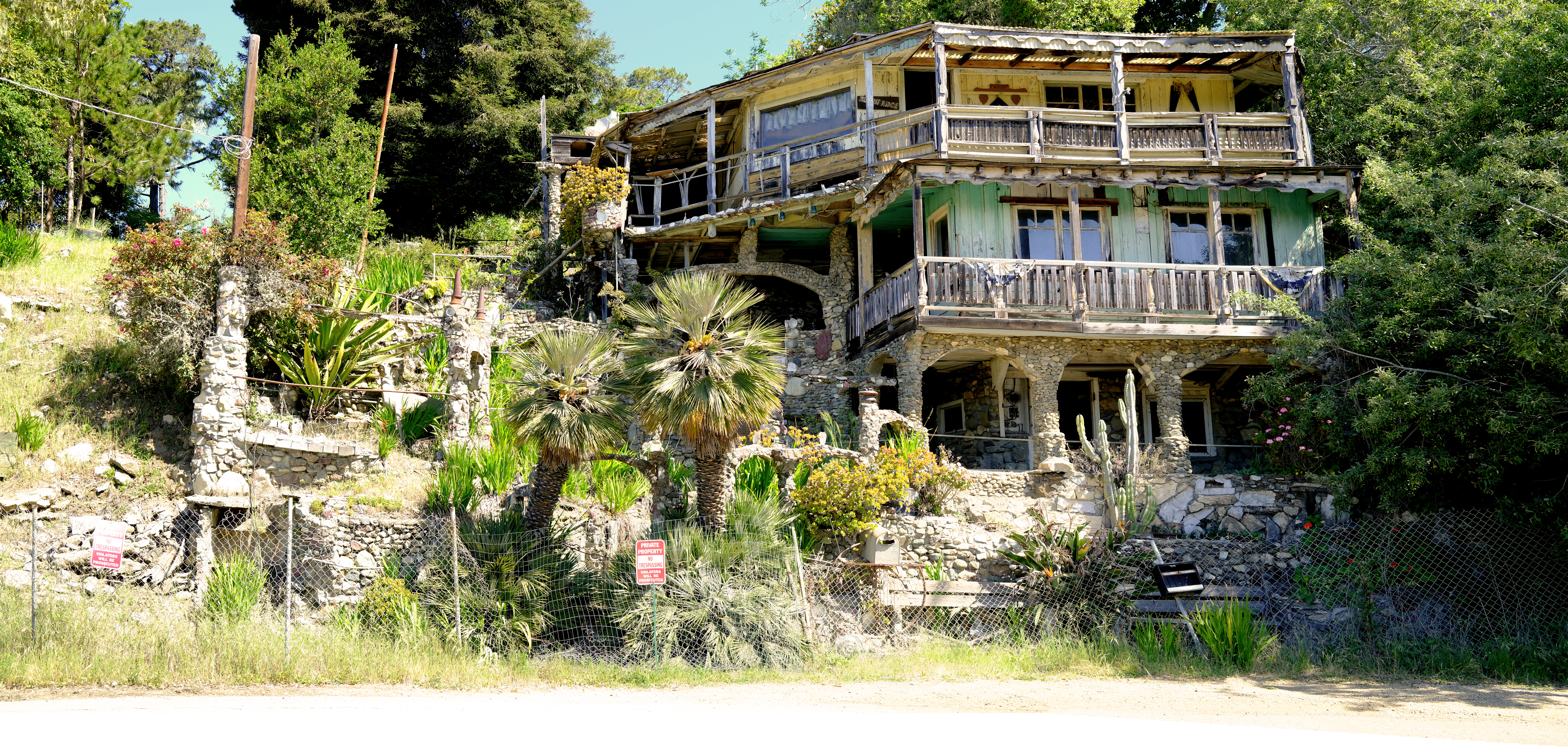
- Nitt Witt Ridge exterior

- Location within California
- 35.566794°N 121.095321°W
- Location: 881 Hillcrest Drive, Cambria, California 93428

Site notes
- Architect: Arthur "Art" Harold Beal

California Historical Landmark
- Reference no.: 939

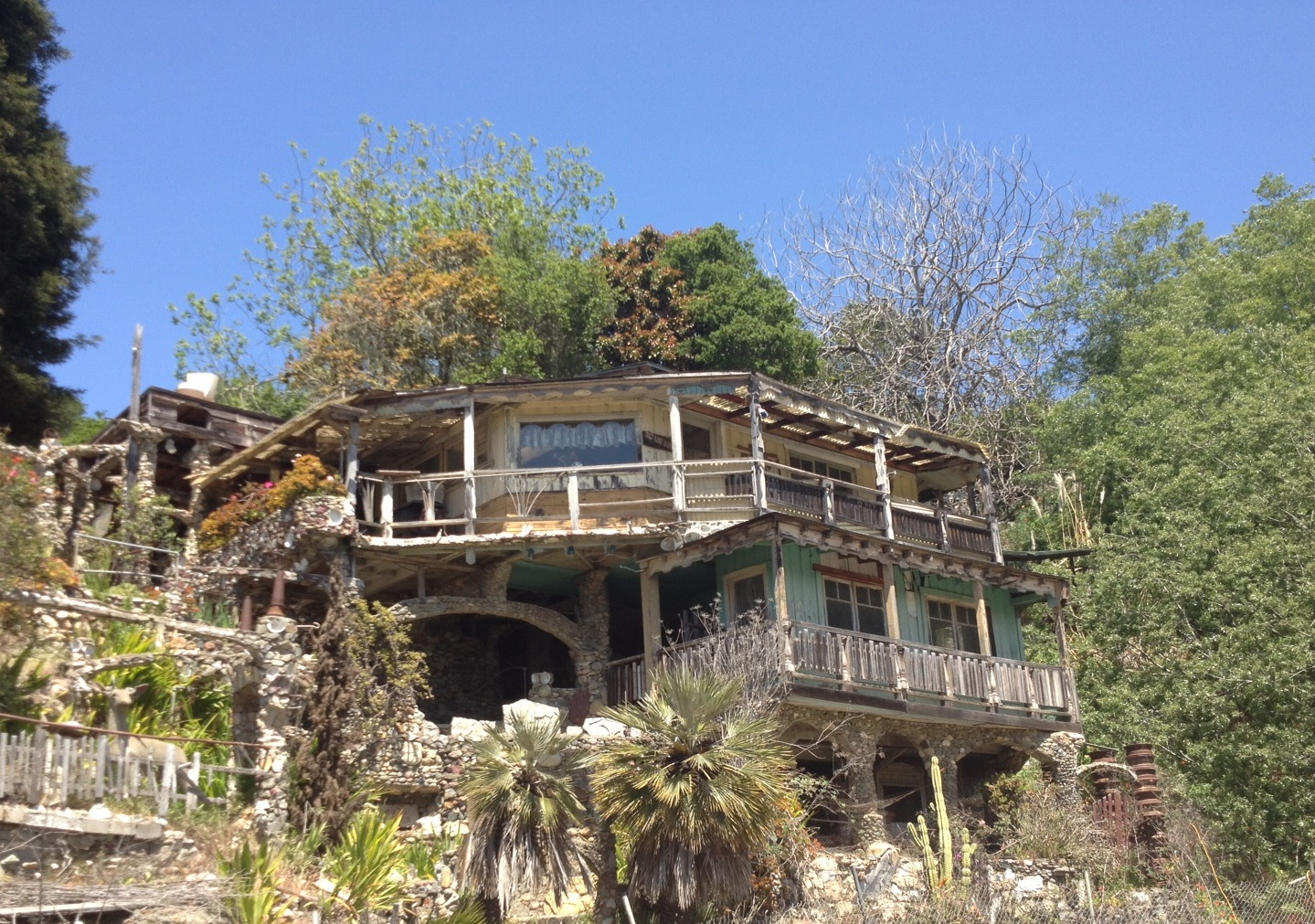
Nitt Witt Ridge, 2013

Nitt Witt Ridge is a house on two and a half acres in the coastal city of Cambria, California, United States. Artist and recluse Arthur "Art" Harold Beal (1896–1992) bought his hillside lot in 1928 and spent most of the next 50 years carving out the terraces with only a pick and shovel, creating his own "castle on a hill".

== History ==
Arthur Harold Beal is known as Der Tinkerpaw or Captain Nitt Witt. Beal was a garbage collector for the town of Cambria in the 1940s and 1950s and made good use of what Cambrians were throwing away, as well as the natural materials on the property, in the nearby pine forests, and on the area's beaches. Some parts are also reportedly remnants from Hearst Castle where he supposedly worked for a time. Other common building materials are beer cans, abalone shells, and concrete. There are also washer drums, car rims, tile, car parts, and old stoves.

After Art died in 1992 at the age of 96, his ashes were spread around his favorite redwood tree on Nitt Witt Ridge. The house still is full of knick-knacks and architectural uniqueness, despite the deterioration and ransacking it suffered after Art's death.

In 1999 Michael and Stacey O'Malley became the owners of Nitt Witt Ridge.

== Preservation ==
Nitt Witt Ridge is California Historical Landmark No. 939. It is considered a thematic landmark, in connection with the Twentieth Century Folk Art Environments. The plaque reads:

Nitt Witt Ridge, one of California's remarkable twentieth-century folk-art environments, is the creation of Arthur Harold Beal (Der Tinkerpaw, or Capt Nitt Witt), a Cambria Pines pioneer who sculpted the land using hand tools and indigenous materials, inventiveness and self-taught skills. A blend of native materials and contemporary elements, impressive in its sheer mass and meticulous placement, it is a revealing memorial to Art's cosmic humor and zest for life.

California Registered Historical Landmark No. 939.

Plaque placed by the State Department of Parks and Recreation in cooperation with Saving and Preserving Arts and Cultural Environments with the Art Beal Foundation, non-profit and educational corporation. June 26, 1986.

== See also ==
- Watts Towers. Sabato "Simon" Rodia constructed towers of wire, concrete and fragments of tile and china, in the Watts neighborhood of Los Angeles.
- Baldassare Forestiere, another Italian immigrant in California born the same year as Rodia, who built the Forestiere Underground Gardens, in Fresno.
- Hermit House, a unique residence located in Herzliya, Israel with intricate mosaics entirely constructed by one man over thirty years.
- Mystery Castle, a house in Phoenix, Arizona built in the 1930s in a similar style.
- Rubel Castle, a house in Glendora, California constructed in a similar style.
- Ferdinand Cheval, a French postman who constructed an "ideal palace" out of rocks in his spare time.
- Justo Gallego Martínez, a Spaniard who built his own cathedral.
- Grandma Prisbrey's Bottle Village. A woman who built a whole village of discarded bottles in Simi Valley, California.
- House on the Rock. Alex Jordan Jr. constructed "Japanese House" atop a rock pinnacle in Spring Green, Wisconsin.
- Coral Castle, a unique estate in Miami-Dade County, Florida made entirely of hand-carved stone by an eccentric immigrant.
