= Galpharm International =

Galpharm International Ltd, trades as Galpharm Healthcare, is the UK's biggest supplier of non-prescription medicine.

The company is based in Dodworth, Barnsley, England and sponsored the Galpharm Stadium in nearby Huddersfield.

== History ==
The company was founded in 1982 by Graham Leslie. In January 2008, the company was acquired by Perrigo for $86 million.

From August 2004 until July 2012, the Huddersfield Town football stadium, also home to the Huddersfield Giants Rugby League club, was known as the Galpharm Stadium as part of a sponsorship deal. The stadium was subsequently renamed the John Smith's Stadium and then the Accu Stadium as a result of further sponsorship deals.

== See also ==
- GW Pharmaceuticals
