= Abbey San Encino =

Historic home in Los Angeles, California

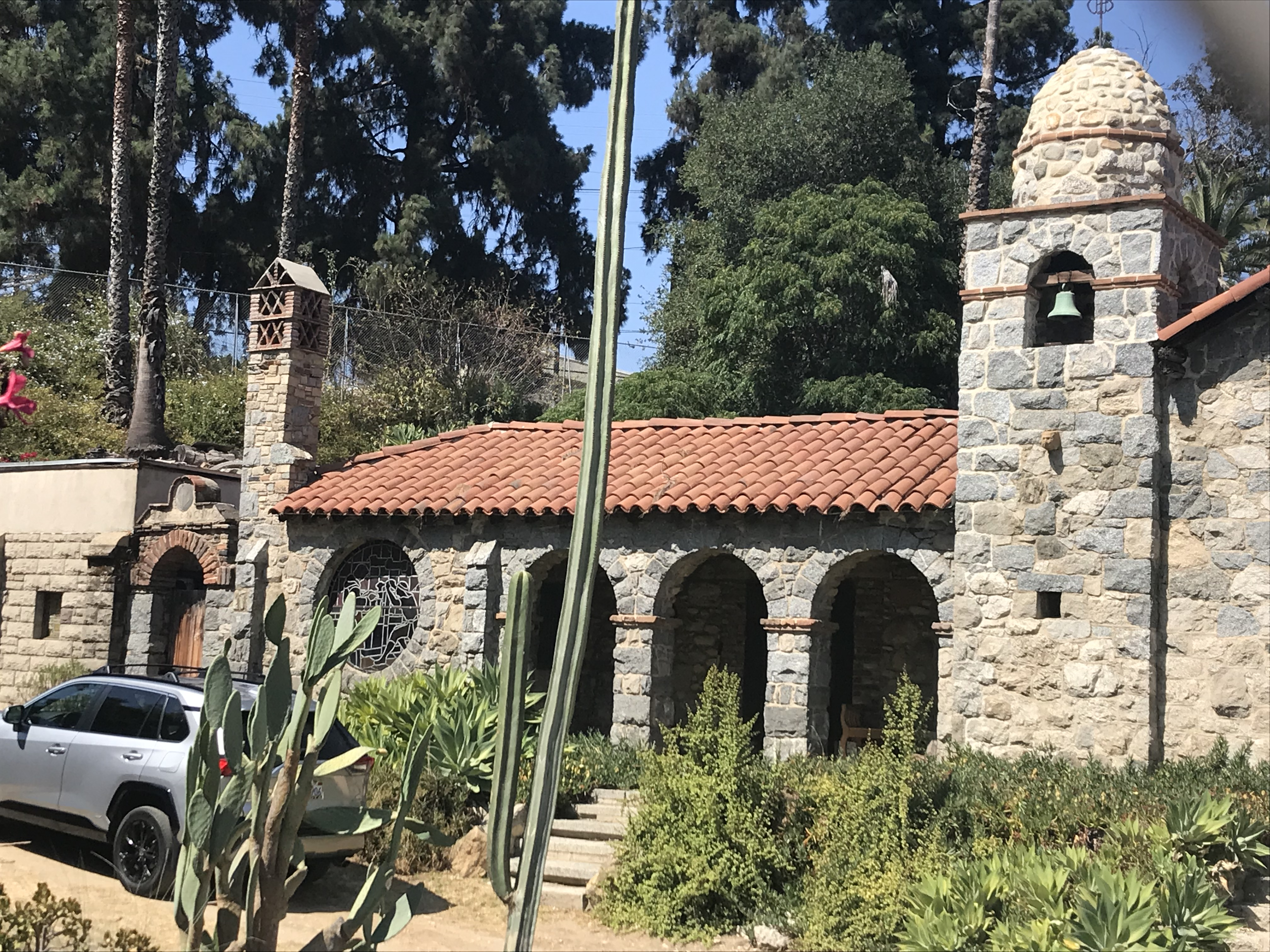
The front of Abbey San Encino

Abbey San Encino is a historic home located at 6211 Arroyo Glen St., Highland Park, Los Angeles. It was built between 1915 and 1929. It is Los Angeles Historic-Cultural Monument #106.

== History ==
Clyde Browne (August 5, 1872, in Old Hickory, Ohio – July 1, 1942, in Los Angeles, California), a printer, moved to Los Angeles in 1902 or 1903 with his wife and son, already a veteran typesetter who had worked from the age of 15 at the Petaluma Imprint, the Marin County Tocsin, San Francisco Call, San Francisco Bulletin, San Francisco Examiner, Sausalito News, Petaluma Argus, and Courier. He had also worked as an apprentice cabin boy on a Pacific Mail steamship, and a seaman for the Oceanic Steamship Company.

Browne aimed to create an artists' collective, setting about building a house inspired by the Roycrofters movement, Spanish Missions, and medieval architecture such as the Mary Queen of Scots Chapel at Holyrood Castle, for prospective members. Thus, beginning in July 1915, Browne created a narrow-gauge railway, the CB and J Railway, to haul stones from the Arroyo Seco to build his manor. He hand-built the home in this way, also utilizing stained glass from local Judson Studios and materials he was gifted from friends including a gargoyle cast from a mold used to produce gargoyles for the Cathedral of Notre Dame, stones from Westminster Abbey, and bolts from the Tower of London. He also used white chalk slabs from the Calabasas hills he collected himself, hand-fired bricks from his own kiln, metal from junked cars, and bells from trains, fire engines, and Garvanza Elementary School. For interior decor, Browne installed a pipe organ created and shipped in pieces from Germany, stained glass salvaged from the Van Nuys Hotel bar, and a Batchelder-designed fireplace.

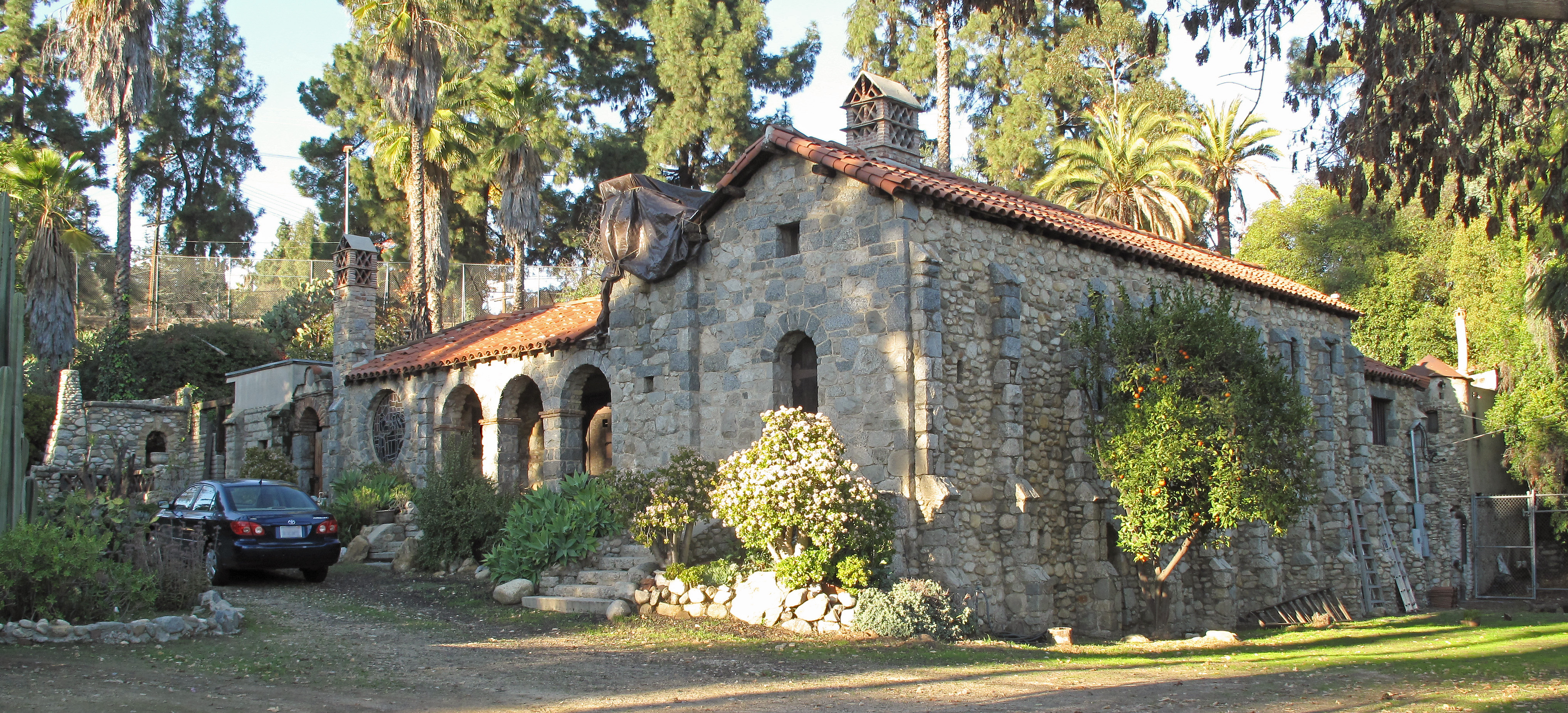
Abbey San Encino

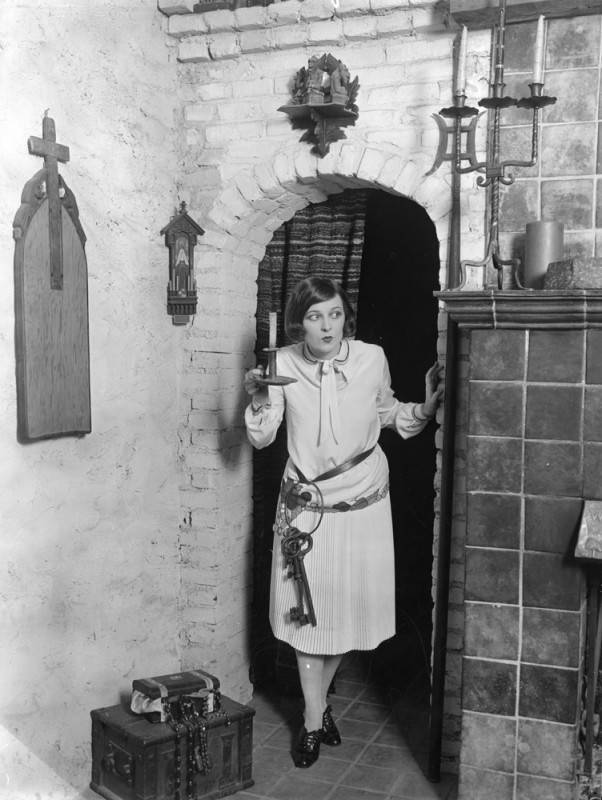
Actress Dorothy Revier at the Abbey San Encino in 1926

Upon moving in with his family, Browne at first called the home "The Studio", then "The Old Stone Abbey", then "Oldestane Abbey", until settling on "Abbey San Encino". Other characters took up residence at the home, including a painter, a wrought-iron worker, a wood-block cutter, a cactus grower, a dressmaker, an earthworm grower, and authors. Browne set up his printshop there as well, equipping it with a linotype machine, a drum cylinder press, a Kluge automatic feeder platen press, and a hand-fed platen press. He mentored many printmakers such as House Olsen, Carl Bigsby, Ward Ritchie, and Lawrence Clark Powell. He became a printer for Occidental College, USC, Pasadena College, and other clients, including people in need of engagement announcements, wedding invitations, and birth announcements. He worked alongside his son Jack, and the two created works such as How to Live Life (1929) and A Couple of Good Scouts (1940).

Browne died on July 1, 1942, and after serving in the army, Jack moved back into the Abbey with his wife and children, Berbie, Jackson, and Severin, Jackson being Jackson Browne who would go on to become a world-famous musician and activist. Browne used a photograph, taken by Alan F. Blumenthal, of the Abbey for the cover of his album For Everyman.
