= Hermit House =

Coordinates: 32.185976°N 34.803708°E

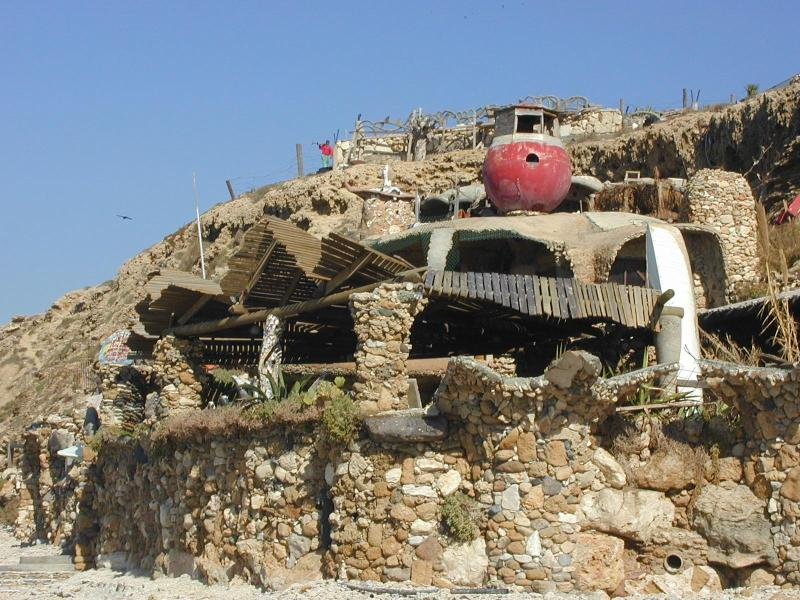
Hermit House

Hermit House is an earthen residence situated on a cliff overlooking the Mediterranean near the Sidna Ali Mosque in Herzliya, Israel, and is an example of vernacular architecture. Its owner, designer, and creator, Nissim Kahlon, has been building the structure solely by hand since the late 1970s, tunnelling deep into the cliff side and using natural sea materials.

The structure includes dozens of chambers covered in highly elaborate tile mosaics made of recycled materials such as blue glass from broken Maccabee beer bottles, plates, and other debris washed ashore. Local city authorities have so far been unable to oust the non-code-compliant resident. Rising sea levels, caused in part by the city's construction of a jetty, pose a threat to Kahlon's work of several decades. Hermit House's exterior is publicly visible and requests for interior tours are occasionally honoured by its owner.

== See also ==
- Watts Towers, intricate Gaudiesque towers decorated with found objects
- Forestiere Underground Gardens, earthen residence and gardens constructed by one man over thirty years.
- Casapueblo, the house of noted Uruguayan artist Carlos Páez Vilaró
- Ferdinand Cheval, a French postman who constructed an "ideal palace" out of rocks in his spare time.
- Rubelia, a castle constructed of found objects located in Glendora, California
- Mystery Castle, a house in Phoenix, Arizona built in the 1930s in a similar style.
- Nitt Witt Ridge, a house in Cambria, California constructed in a similar style.
