= Nissim Kahlon =

Israeli hermit (born c 1947)

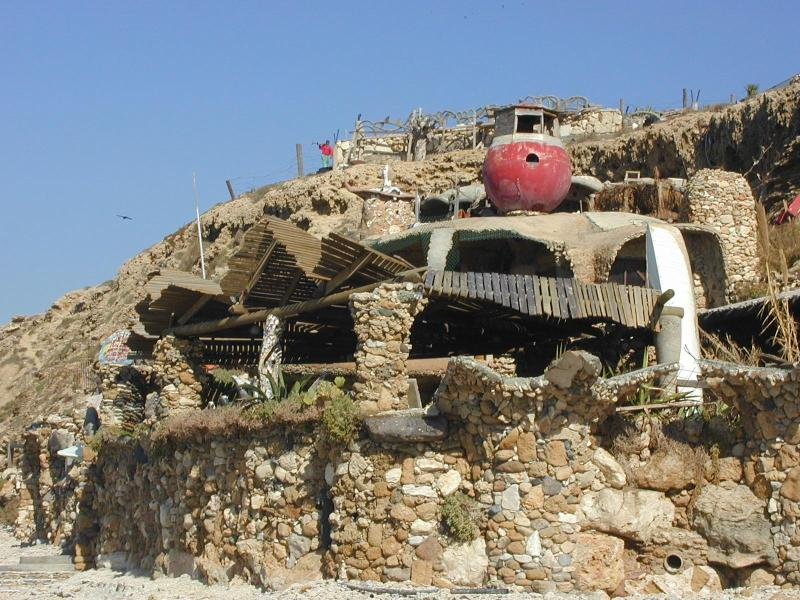
Kahlon's house

Nissim Kahlon (born 1946 or 1947) is an Israeli hermit who created the Hermit House in Herzliya.

== Biography ==
Born in 1946 or 1947, Nissim Kahlon is a Jewish man who is the divorced father of three children. He lived in a tent in Herzliya beach in 1973 before creating a cave-house on Sidna Ali Beach in Apollonia National Park since 1974, Kahlon was ordered to leave by the Israeli Ministry of Environmental Protection. According to Kahlon, the Ministry claim his house is dangerous to the stability of the cliff into which it is built. He was served an eviction notice in 2023.

His home lacks a telephone or internet connection, but has had a water and electrical connection since at least 1992. It is constructed using discarded materials such as local rock, tile, ceramic and glass.

Kahlon was the subject of the documentary Appollonian Story, directed by Ilan Moskovitch and Dan Bronfeld.

== See also ==
- Vernacular architecture
