= Herzog, Fox & Ne'eman =

Israeli law firm

Herzog, Fox & Ne'eman Law Office
- Type: Partnership (Israel)
- Industry: Law
- Founded: Tel Aviv, Israel; 1972; 54 years ago
- Headquarters: Herzog Tower, 4 Yitzhak Sade St., Tel Aviv, Israel
- Key people: [eir Linzen, chairman Gil White, managing partner Adam Eytan, senior partner Joseph (Yossi) Ashkenazi, senior partner Ran Hai, senior partner Nir Dash, senior partner Yair Geva, senior partner Hanan Haviv, senior partner
- Services: Legal advice
- Revenue: Unknown
- Number of employees: 750+
- Website: herzoglaw.co.il

Herzog or Herzog, Fox & Ne'eman (HFN) is a full-service commercial law firm located in Tel Aviv, Israel. As of 2024, the firm employs over 470 lawyers, of whom more than 200 are partners.

== History ==
The firm was founded in 1972 by three prominent lawyers:

- Chaim Herzog, later the Israeli ambassador to the United Nations, member of the Israeli Knesset and the sixth president of the State of Israel
- Michael Fox, established a successful London law firm before immigrating to Israel known for his corporate work and his legal contributions to the development of the infrastructure, energy and natural resources of Israel;
- Dr. Ya'akov Ne'eman, author of numerous publications on tax law and respected tax advisor to the government and major local and foreign corporations, later serving as Israeli minister of finance and minister of justice

The firm joined Ius Laboris, the international law firm network, in 2012.

== Areas of expertise ==
The firm's expertise covers the following areas:

- Corporate
  - Capital markets and securities
  - Commercial law
  - High tech
  - Mergers and acquisitions
  - Privatisation and restructuring
- Banking and finance
  - Banking regulation and finance law
  - Corporate finance
  - Insolvency and restructuring
  - Investment banking
  - Project finance
  - Derivatives and financial instruments
- Tax law
  - Investment funds / private equity
  - Corporate tax
  - Employee tax benefits
  - Private clients, trusts and estates
  - International tax planning
  - Transfer pricing
- Litigation/dispute resolution
  - Arbitration & ADR
  - Class actions
  - Commercial litigation
  - Corporate and securities litigation
- Regulatory/governmental
  - Administrative law
  - Corporate compliance
  - White-collar crime
  - Public international law
  - Telecommunications and media
- Antitrust & competition
- Real estate and construction law
- Environment and climate change

Sectors and industries:

- Charities, non-profit organisations and NGOs
- Defence, aerospace and homeland security
- Employee benefits / executive compensation
- Energy and natural resources
- Food and drug regulation
- Gaming
- Intellectual property
- Internet and e-commerce
- Labour and employment law
- Licensing
- Life sciences, healthcare and pharmaceuticals
- Private investment funds
- Public sector
- AdTech and monetization
- Cyber law
- Industrial manufacturing
- Financial institutionss
- Specialist practice areas
  - China and Asia Pacific
  - Japan Practice
  - Russia and CIS practice
