= Joseph C. Papa =

- Born: October 1, 1955 (age 71); Connecticut, US
- Education: University of Connecticut; Northwestern University
- Title: Chairman and CEO, Emergent BioSolutions
- Term: Feb 2024-
- Board member of: Emergent BioSolutions
- Children: 3

Joseph C. Papa (born October 1, 1955) is an American businessman and the former chairman and chief executive officer (CEO) of Bausch & Lomb, a company formed from the initial public offering (IPO) of the eye health business of Bausch Health Companies Inc.

== Early life ==
Papa received a bachelor's degree in pharmacy from the University of Connecticut in 1978, and an MBA degree in marketing and finance from Northwestern University's Kellogg Graduate School of Management in 1983.

== Career ==
Papa has been chairman and CEO of Bausch & Lomb since its IPO in May 2022. He was previously chairman and CEO of Bausch Health Companies Inc. (formerly Valeant Pharmaceuticals International, Inc.), having succeeded J. Michael Pearson in those roles in May 2016. Papa resigned as CEO of Bausch Health upon becoming chairman and CEO of Bausch & Lomb in May 2022, but retained his position as chairman of Bausch Health until his resignation on June 23, 2022. Prior to joining Valeant, Papa was the chairman and CEO of Perrigo, an American manufacturer of private label over-the-counter pharmaceuticals, from 2006 to 2016. From December 2004 to October 2006, Papa was chairman and CEO of the pharmaceutical and technologies services of Cardinal Health, an Ohio health care services company. From 2001 to 2004, he was president and chief operating officer of Watson Pharmaceuticals, Inc. He has also worked at Novartis and Pharmacia/Searle, where he launched the medications Celebrex, Diovan, and Lotrel.

In 2014, he was ranked 47th on Harvard Business Review's "Best Performing CEOs in the World".

=== Total compensation ===
In March 2017, it was reported that Papa received US$62.7 million in total compensation for his first eight months of work in 2016.

In March 2020, Bausch Health reported that Papa's gross income for 2019 rose to $17.1 million from $14.7 million in 2018.

In May 2022, Bausch Health reported that Papa’s gross income increased again to $22.9 million, as compared to the $44,617 median compensation of all other Bausch Health employees, reflecting a pay ratio of 513:1.

== Personal life ==
As of May 2015, Papa had been married for 32 years.
