= Clyde Browne (printer) =

American printer (1872–1942)

Clyde Browne (August 5, 1872, in Old Hickory, Ohio – July 1, 1942, in Los Angeles, California) was a printer associated with the Artists of the Arroyo Seco, Los Angeles of the early 20th Century in Los Angeles County.

Browne began working as a printer with the Petaluma Imprint at the age of 15 and later worked for a number of San Francisco Bay Area newspapers.

Browne relocated to Los Angeles in 1902 or 1903 where he worked for four years in the press room of the Los Angeles Examiner.

Browne left the Examiner in 1909 during a labor dispute and opened his own print shop with Alexander B. Cartwright under the imprint "Browne and Cartwright". One of the imprint's first titles was the "Frosh Bible" for Occidental College in 1910. Soon after, he helped Occidental College and the University of Southern California start their own school newspapers.

Browne would maintain a close association with Occidental for the remainder of his life, printing various college publications including two volumes of the yearbook La Encina.

Browne's grandson is singer-songwriter Jackson Browne.

== Abbey Press (Los Angeles) ==
In 1915, Browne began building the Abbey San Encino, finished in July 1924, where he did printing.
