= Moshe Idel =

Israeli historian and philosopher of Jewish mysticism (born 1947)

- משה אידל
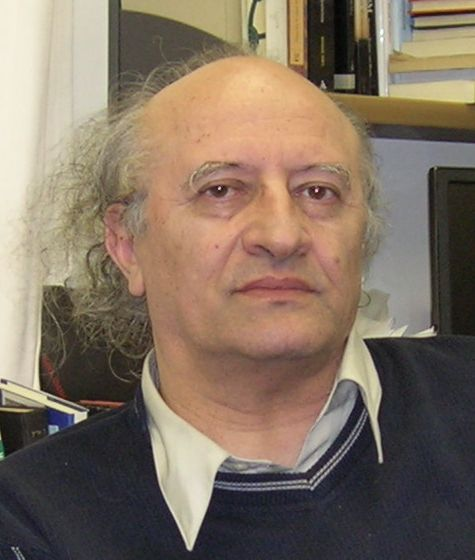
- Born: 19 January 1947 (age 79); Târgu Neamț, Romania
- Occupations: Historian, philosopher
- Awards: Israel Prize (1999); Bialik Prize (1993); EMET Prize (2002)

Academic work
- Institutions: Hebrew University of Jerusalem; Shalom Hartman Institute
- Notable works: Kabbalah: New Perspectives

Moshe Idel (Hebrew: משה אידל; born January 19, 1947) is a Romanian-born Israeli historian and philosopher of Jewish mysticism. He is Emeritus Max Cooper Professor in Jewish Thought at the Hebrew University, Jerusalem, and a Senior Researcher at the Shalom Hartman Institute.

== Life and scholarship ==
Born in Târgu Neamț, Romania, on 19 January 1947. Idel was a precocious child, with a passion for reading which made him read all the books in the town, cooperative, then High school Library, in addition to buying more books with the money earned by singing at weddings. Although the Holocaust did not directly affect the Jewish population of Târgu Neamț, they were affected by the so-called “population displacements”. In 1963 he immigrated with his family to Israel, settling in Haifa.

Enrolled at the Hebrew University, he studied under Shlomo Pines. After earning his doctorate with a thesis on Abraham Abulafia, he eventually succeeded Scholem to the chair of Jewish Thought. He has served as visiting Professor at the Jewish Theological Seminary of America, UCLA, Yale, Harvard, Princeton, University of Pennsylvania and the Collège de France.

Idel has undertaken a systematic revision of the history and analysis of Jewish mysticism. His explorations of the mythical, theurgical, mystical, and messianic dimensions of Judaism have been attentive to history, sociology, and anthropology, while rejecting a naïve historicist approach to Judaism. His 1988 work, Kabbalah: New Perspectives (Yale University Press), is said to have revolutionised Kabbalah studies. His historical and phenomenological studies of rabbinic, philosophic, kabbalistic, and Hasidic texts have transformed the understanding of Jewish intellectual history and highlighted the close relationship between magic, mysticism, and liturgy. He is also a three-time fellow at the University of Pennsylvania's Katz Center for Advanced Judaic Studies.

== Awards ==
In 1999, Idel was awarded the Israel Prize for excellent achievement in the field of Jewish philosophy, and in 2002 the EMET Prize for Jewish Thought. In 2003, he received the Koret Award for Jewish philosophy for his book Absorbing Perfections. He has been conferred honorary doctorates by the universities of Yale, Budapest, Haifa, Cluj, Iasi and Bucharest. In 1993, he received the Bialik Prize for Jewish thought.

=== Book awards ===
- 1989: National Jewish Book Award in Scholarship for Kabbalah: New Perspectives
- 2007: National Jewish Book Award in Scholarship for Ben: sonship and Jewish mysticism

== Works ==
The following is a list of Idel’s publications in English.

- Kabbalah: New Perspectives (Yale University Press, New Haven and London, 1988).
- The Mystical Experience in Abraham Abulafia (tr. from the Hebrew by Jonathan Chipman. Albany, State University of New York Press, 1988).
- Studies in Ecstatic Kabbalah [Albany, N.Y., State University of New York Press, 1988]
- Language, Torah and Hermeneutics in Abraham Abulafia (tr. Menahem Kallus. Albany, State University of New York Press, 1989).
- Golem: Jewish magical and mystical traditions on the artificial anthropoid (Albany, State University of New York Press, 1990).
- Hasidism: Between Ecstasy and Magic (SUNY Press, Albany, 1994).
- Mystical Union and Monotheistic Faith, An Ecumenical Dialogue, eds. M. Idel, B. McGinn (New York, Macmillan, 1989; 2nd edn, Continuum, 1996).
- Messianic Mystics (Yale University Press, New Haven, London, 1998).
- Jewish Mystical Leaders and Leadership, eds. M. Idel, M. Ostow (Jason Aronson, Northvale, 1998).
- Abraham Abulafia, An Ecstatic Kabbalist, Two Studies (ed. Moshe Lazar, Labyrinthos, CA, 2002).
- Absorbing Perfections, Kabbalah and Interpretation (Yale University Press, New Haven, 2002).
- Ascensions on High in Jewish Mysticism: Pillars, Lines, Ladders (CEU, Budapest, 2005).
- Enchanted Chains: Techniques and Rituals in Jewish Mysticism (The Cherub Press, Los Angeles, 2005).
- Kabbalah and Eros (Yale University Press, New Haven, 2005).
- Ben: Sonship and Jewish Mysticism (Continuum, London, New York, 2007)
- Old Worlds, New Mirrors, On Jewish Mysticism and Twentieth-Century Thought (University of Pennsylvania Press, Philadelphia, 2009).
- Kabbalah in Italy 1280-1510 (Yale University Press, New Haven, 2011).
- Saturn’s Jews, On the Witches’ Sabbat and Sabbateanism (Continuum, London, New York, 2011).
- Mircea Eliade: From Myth to Magic (Peter Lang, New York, 2014).
- Representing God, eds. H. Samuelson-Tirosh, A. Hughes (Leiden, Brill, 2014).
- Kabbalah : a neurocognitive approach to mystical experiences, with Shahar Arzy, (New Haven, Yale University Press, 2015).
- The Privileged Divine Feminine in Kabbalah (Boston, De Gruyter, 2018).
- Golem: Jewish Magical and Mystical Traditions on the Artificial Anthropoid (Brooklyn, NY, KTAV Publishing House, 2019).
- Vocal Rites and Broken Theologies: Cleaving to Vocables in R. Israel Ba'al Shem Tov's Mysticism (Crossroad, New York, 2020).
- Middot: On the Emergence of Kabbalistic Theosophies (KTAV Publishing House, New York, 2021)

== Students ==
- Prof. Jonathan Garb, Hebrew University
- Prof. Boaz Huss, Ben-Gurion University
- Prof. Haviva Pedaya, Ben-Gurion University

== See also ==
- Rachel Elior
- Elliot R. Wolfson
- Yehuda Liebes
- Gershom Scholem
- Shlomo Pines
