= Nathan Rotenstreich =

Nathan Rotenstreich נתן רוטנשטרייך
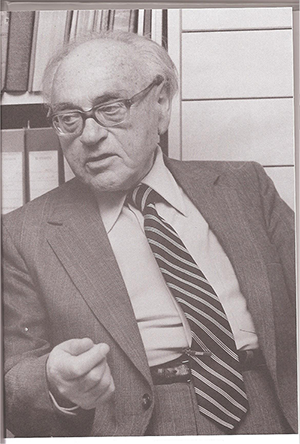
- Born: March 31, 1914; Sambir, Galicia
- Died: October 11, 1993 (aged 79); Jerusalem, Israel
- Citizenship: Israeli
- Writing career
- Language: Hebrew
- Notable awards: Israel Prize (1963); Bialik Prize (1991)

Nathan Rotenstreich (Hebrew: נתן רוטנשטרייך; born 31 March 1914, died 11 October 1993) was an Israeli professor of philosophy.

== Biography ==
Nathan Rotenstreich (31.3.1914 – 11.10.1993) was born in Sambir, Galicia, then in Austria-Hungary, later in Poland, now in Ukraine. His father, Ephraim Fischel Rotenstreich, was a Zionist leader and a member of the Polish two houses of Parliament. In 1932, at the age of 18, Rotenstreich emigrated to Mandate Palestine.

Rotenstreich studied philosophy at the Hebrew University of Jerusalem, receiving his PhD in 1938. He joined the faculty in 1950 and served as Dean of the faculty of Humanities (1958-1962) and the Rector of the university from 1965 to 1969. He was a member of the Israel Academy of Sciences and Humanities from 1959, and its vice president at the time of his death. He wrote 80 books and more than 1000 papers in various languages.

In 1973, he was appointed the first Chairman of the Planning and Budgeting Committee of the Council for Higher Education in Israel. He was actively involved in public life in Israel, was a member of Mapai party for a while, and expressed his political views in many articles published in Israeli newspapers. He engaged in public debates with David Ben Gurion together with other colleagues regarding Ben Gurion's views of the role of the Jewish State in history and also at the time of the Lavon Affair.

Awards and honors The Tchernichovsky Prize for the translation of Kant's Critiques in 1964. The Israel Prize in Humanities in 1963 for his works and achievements in philosophy. The Bialik Prize in Jewish Thought in 1991.

He died in Jerusalem in October 1993. In his memory there is a square in Jerusalem and a street in Be'er Sheva. Also, Nathan Rotenstreich scholarships for Ph.D. Students in Humanities are awarded each year by the Planning and Budgeting Committee of the Council for Higher Education

== Awards and honours ==
- In 1963, Rotenstreich was awarded the Israel Prize in the humanities.
- In 1991, he was the co-recipient (jointly with Mordechai Altshuler) of the Bialik Prize for Jewish thought.

== Published works ==
- Between Past and Present. An Essay on History. New Haven: Yale, 1958. Repr. New York: Kennikat, 1973.
- Humanism in the Contemporary Era. The Hague: Mouton, 1963.
- The Recurring Pattern: Studies in Anti-Judaism in Modern Thought. London: Weidenfeld and Nicolson, 1963.
- Spirit and Man: An Essay on Being and Value. The Hague: Nijhoff, 1963.
- Basic Problems of Marx's Philosophy. Indianapolis: Bobbs-Merrill, 1965.
- Experience and Its Systematization Studies in Kant. The Hague: Nijhoff, 1965. 2nd enl. ed. 1972.
- On the Human Subject: Studies in the Phenomenology of Ethics and Politics. Springfield: Thomas, 1966.
- Jewish Philosophy in Modern Times: From Mendelssohn to Rosenzweig. New York: Holt, Rinehart and Winston, 1968. Repr. Wayne State University Press, 1994.
- Philosophy: The Concept and Its Manifestations. Dordrecht: Reidel, 1972.
- Tradition and Reality: The Impact of History on Modern Jewish Thought. New York: Random House, 1972.
- From Substance to Subject: Studies in Hegel. The Hague: Nijhoff, 1974.
- Philosophy, History, and Politics: Studies in Contemporary English Philosophy of History. The Hague: Nijhoff, 1976.
- Theory and Practice: An Essay on Human Intentionalities. The Hague: Nijhoff, 1977.
- Practice and Realization: Studies in Kant's Moral Philosophy. The Hague: Nijhoff, 1979.
- Essays on Zionism and the Contemporary Jewish Condition. New York: Herzl Press, 1980.
- The Holocaust as Historical Experience: Essays and a Discussion New York: Holmes and Meier, 1981.
- Wege zur Erkennbarkeit der Welt. Freiburg, München: Alber Verlag 1983.
- Man and His Dignity. Jerusalem: Magnes, 1983.
- Legislation and Exposition: Studies in Kant and Hegel. Bonn: Bouvier Verlag Herbert Grundmann, 1984.
- Jews and German Philosophy. New York: Schocken, 1984.
- Reflection and Action. Dordrecht: Nijhoff, 1985.
- Time and Meaning in History. Dordrecht: Reidel, 1987.
- Order and Might. Albany: SUNY, 1988.
- Alienation: The Concept and Its Reception. Leiden: Brill, 1989.
- Immediacy and Its Limits: A Study in Martin Buber's Thought. Chur: Harwood, 1991.

(To be completed)

== See also ==
- List of Israel Prize recipients
