= Bialik Prize =

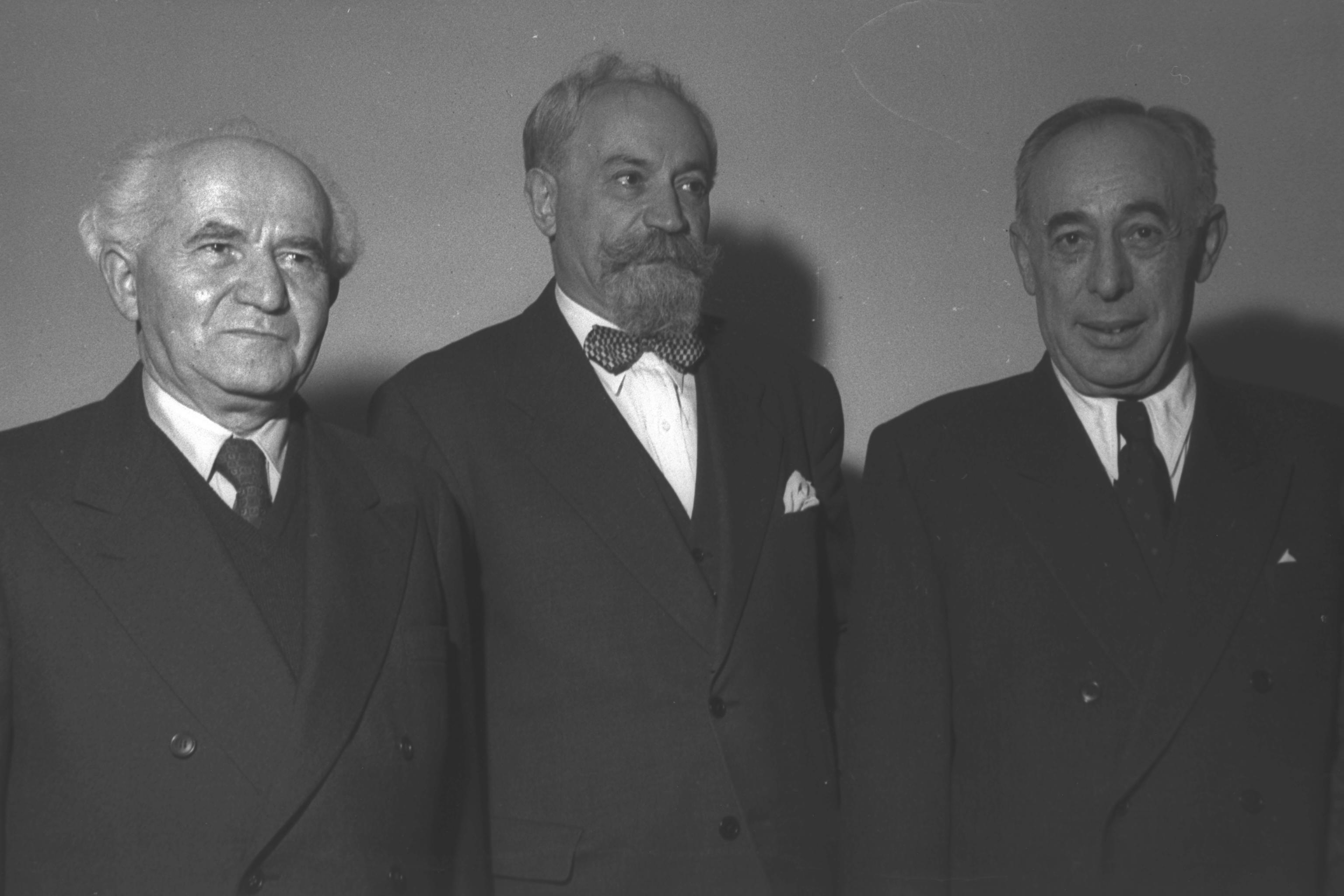
- 1952 award ceremony; from left: David Ben-Gurion, Zalman Shneur, and Tel Aviv mayor Israel Rokach.
- Awarded for: Literature and Jewish thought
- Country: Israel
- Presented by: Tel Aviv Municipality
- Established: 1933
- Website: Bialik Prize

The Bialik Prize (Hebrew: פרס ביאליק) is one of Israel's most prestigious literary awards. Established in 1933 by the Tel Aviv Municipality, it is awarded annually in recognition of significant contributions to Hebrew literature. The prize is named in honor of the national poet of Israel, Hayim Nahman Bialik, and was inaugurated to coincide with his 60th birthday.

The award is presented in two distinct categories: Literature, encompassing fiction and poetry, and Jewish Thought (Hebrew: חכמת ישראל, romanized: Ḥokhmat Yisra'el), which recognizes scholarly contributions to Jewish philosophy and scholarship. Since its inception, the prize has served as a primary marker of excellence within the Hebrew-language literary and academic canon.

== List of recipients ==
Year	Literature	Jewish Thought
1933	Devorah Baron; Matityahu Shoham	Yehezkel Kaufmann^{1956}
1934	Shmuel Yosef Agnon^{1950}	—
1935	Avraham Freiman	Benyamin Menasseh Levin
1936	David Shimoni^{1949}	Raphael Patai; Moshe Zvi Segal^{1950}
1937	Jacob Steinberg	Avraham Kahana
1938	Ya'akov Cohen	Baruch Chizik
1939	Asher Barash; Yehuda Burla^{1954}	Zvi Rudy; Melech Zagrodski
1940	Zelda Mishkovsky; Shaul Tchernichovsky^{1942}	Naftali Herz Tur-Sinai
1941	Shalom Yosef Shapira	Joseph Klausner^{1949}
1942	Haim Hazaz^{1970}; Shaul Tchernichovsky^{1940}	Nahum Slouschz
1943	Aharon Avraham Kabak	Abraham Polak
1944	Yehuda Karni; Shlomo Zemach	Yeruḥam Fishel Lachower
1945	Jacob Fichman^{1953}	Yitzhak Baer
1946	Gershon Shofman; Natan Yonatan	Yehuda Gur
1947	Uri Zvi Grinberg^{1954, 1977}	Shmuel Abba Hordotzki
1948	Max Brod	Jacob Nachum Epstein
1949	David Shimoni^{1936}	Joseph Klausner^{1941}
1950	Shmuel Yosef Agnon^{1934}	Moshe Zvi Segal^{1936}
1951	Zalman Shneur	David Ben-Gurion^{1971}
1952	Isaac Dov Berkowitz^{1965}	Chaim Yehoshua Kosovski
1953	Jacob Fichman^{1945}	Yitzhak Ben-Zvi
1954	Yehuda Burla^{1939}; Uri Zvi Grinberg^{1947, 1977}	Nahman Avigad
1955	Moshe Shamir	Michael Avi-Yonah; Shmuel Yeivin
1956	Zvi Vislevsky	Yehezkel Kaufmann^{1933}
1957	Nathan Alterman	Saul Lieberman
1958	—	Moshe Zilberg
1959	Avraham Shlonsky; Eliezer Steinman	Moshe Meizlish
1960	—	Yosef Braslavy
1961	Mordechai Ben Yehezkel	Martin Buber
1962	Baruch Kurzweil	Yosef Qafih^{1973}
1964	Yocheved Bat-Miriam	Avraham Ya’ari
1965	Isaac Dov Berkowitz^{1952}	Yehuda Ratzaby^{1979}
1966	Israel Efrat; Zalman Shazar	Shraga Abramson
1967	Simon Halkin	Abba Bendavid
1968	Ezra Zussman	Getzel Kressel
1969	Aharon Reuveni	Hanoch Albeck
1970	Haim Hazaz^{1942}	Nechemia Aloni
1971	Amir Gilboa	David Ben-Gurion^{1951}
1972	Abraham Regelson	Yeshayahu Tishbi
1973	Avraham Kariv; Aharon Megged	Yosef Qafih^{1962}
1974	Israel Cohen	Yehuda Komlosh
1975	Haim Gouri	—
1976	Yehuda Amichai; Yeshurun Keshet	Benyamin Kosovski
1977	Uri Zvi Grinberg^{1947, 1954}	Gershom Scholem
1978	Abba Kovner; Zelda	Yehoshua Ben-Arieh; Aaron Mirski
1979	Aharon Appelfeld; Avot Yeshurun	Yitzhak Raphael; Yehuda Ratzaby^{1965}
1980	Dov Sadan	Dan Miron
1981	Zrubavel Gilad; Yehoshua Tan-Pi	Avraham Even-Shoshan; Zev Vilnay
1982	Nathan Zach	Israel Levin
1983	Nisim Aloni; Ozer Rabin	Ephraim Urbach; Nechama Leibowitz
1984	Yehoshua Bar-Yosef; David Shahar	Mordechai Breuer
1985	Hanoch Bartov; Shlomo Tanai	Hillel Barzel; David Weiss Halivni; Shlomo Pines
1986	Yitzhak Auerbuch-Orpaz; Amos Oz	Ezra Fleischer
1987	Moshe Dor; Dahlia Ravikovitch	Gershon Shaked
1988	Nathan Shaham	Israel Eldad; Zvi Meir Rabinovitz
1989	Avner Treinin; A. B. Yehoshua	Shmuel Abramski; Shlomo Morag
1990	T. Carmi; Pinchas Sadeh	Menachem Dorman; Aryeh Kasher
1991	S. Yizhar	Mordechai Altshuler; Nathan Rotenstreich
1992	Gabriel Preil	—
1993	David Avidan; Amalia Kahana-Carmon	Jonah Frankel; Moshe Idel
1994	Hanoch Levin; Meir Wieseltier	Benjamin Pinkus
1996	Yehudit Handel; Ya'akov Orland	Avraham Grossman
1997	Yehoshua Kenaz	—
1998	Nurit Govrin; Ephraim Kishon; Aryeh Sivan	Aharon Dotan; Eliezer Goldman; Menahem Haran
1999	Aharon Almog; Yoram Kaniuk; Nurit Zarchi	—
2002	Haim Be'er; Maya Bejerano; Yoel Hoffman; Miriam Roth	Dov Noy; Israel Ta-Shma; Israel Jacob Yuval
2004	David Grossman; Haya Shenhav; Ephraim Sidon	Moshe Kosovski; Mendel Pikaz; Uriel Simon
2006	Ruth Almog; Raquel Chalfi; Uri Orlev	Yosef Gorny; Chava Turniansky
2008	Oded Burla; Israel Eliraz; Yeshayahu Koren	Ezra Mendelsohn; David Vital
2010	Lea Aini; Shlomit Cohen-Assif; Mordechai Geldman	Devorah Dimant; Immanuel Etkes
2018	Shoham Smith; Sami Bardugo; Aharon Shabtai	—
2022	—	Avi Sagi; Ziva Shamir
