= Gershon Shaked =

Israeli literary critic (1929–2006)

- גרשון שקד
- Born: Gerhard Mandel; 8 July 1929; Vienna, Austria
- Died: 28 December 2006 (aged 77); Jerusalem
- Occupations: Scholar, critic
- Known for: Hebrew literary criticism
- Awards: Bialik Prize (1987); Israel Prize (1993)

Gershon Shaked (Hebrew: גרשון שקד; 1929–2006) was an Israeli scholar and critic of Hebrew literature.

== Biography ==
Gerhard Mandel (later Gershon Shaked) was born in Vienna, Austria. He immigrated to Mandate Palestine alone in 1939, and was later followed by his parents. He attended Gymnasia Herzliya in Tel Aviv. He hebraicized his surname to "Shaked"(almond). He was married to Malka, and had two daughters.

Shaked's major oeuvre is his Hebrew Narrative Fiction: 1880–1980, a series of five volumes that were published between 1977 and 1998. In these volumes he coined the term "The Zionist super-plot" and offered a broad perspective on the modern Hebrew literary system, its inner logic and development.

Shaked was a member of Israel Academy of Sciences and Humanities, and published about twenty books, hundreds of articles and also autobiographical writing. He studied the works of authors such as Mendele Mocher Sforim, H.N. Bialik, S.Y. Agnon, Amos Oz and A.B. Yehoshua, as well as general currents in modern Hebrew literature – both in retrospect and in real time, as they were evolving.

== Academic career ==
In 1950, Shaked studied at the Hebrew University of Jerusalem, where he earned a doctorate in Hebrew literature in 1964 and later chaired the Department of Hebrew Literature. In addition to his many publications in Hebrew, he also wrote more than thirty books of criticism in other languages.

== Awards and recognition ==
- 1987: Bialik Prize for Jewish thought.
- 1993: Israel Prize for Hebrew literature.
- 2000–2001: Fellow, Katz Center for Advanced Judaic Studies
- 2004: Bahat Award for Non-Fiction.

== Bibliography (Hebrew) ==
- On Four Stories, The Jewish Agency for Israel (Hebrew: על ארבעה סיפורים : פרקים ביסודות הסיפור). The Jewish Agency for Israel, 1963
- Laughter and Tears: Studies in Mendele Mocher Sforimʹs Works (Hebrew: בין שחוק לדמע : עיונים ביצירתו של מנדלי מוכר-ספרים). The Hebrew Writers Association, Massada, 1965
- On Three Plays (Hebrew: על שלושה מחזות : פרקים ביסודות המחזה). The Jewish Agency for Israel, 1968
- The Hebrew Historical Drama in the Twentieth Century (Hebrew: המחזה העברי ההיסטורי בתקופת התחייה : נושאים וצורות). Bialik Institute, 1970
- A New Direction in Hebrew Narrative (Hebrew: גל חדש בסיפורת העברית : מסות על סיפורת ישראלית צעירה). Sifriat Poalim, 1971
- If You Ever Forget: Essays on American-Jewish Literature (Hebrew: אם תשכח אי-פעם: עיונים בספרות יהודית-אמריקאית ונספח על סופר יהודי-גרמני). Eked Publishing, 1971
- Dead End : studies in J. H. Brenner, M. J. Berdichevsky, G. Shoffman and U. N. Gnessin (Hebrew: ללא מוצא : על י.ח. ברנר, מ.י. ברדיצ'בסקי, ג. שופמן וא.נ. גנסין). Hakibbutz Hameuchad Publishing House, 1973
- The Narrative Art of S.Y. Agnon (Hebrew: אמנות הסיפור של עגנון). Sifriat Poalim, 1976
- A New Direction in Hebrew Narrative (Hebrew: גל חדש בסיפורת העברית : מסות על סיפורת ישראלית צעירה). Sifriat Poalim, 1971 (Extended Edition in 1974)
- Hebrew Narrative Fiction 1880–1980 [5 vols.] (Hebrew: הסיפורת העברית 1880–1980 (5 כרכים)). Hakibbutz Hameuchad Publishing House, 1977–1998
- No Other Place (essays) (Hebrew: אין מקום אחר : על ספרות וחברה). Hakibbutz Hameuchad Publishing House, 1983 (Extended Edition in 1988)
- Wave After Wave in Hebrew Narrative (Hebrew: גל אחר גל בסיפורת העברית). Keter Publishing, 1985
- Four Chapters in Applied Reception Theory (Hebrew: יצירות ונמעניהן : ארבעה פרקים בתורת ההתקבלות). The Katz Research Institute for Hebrew Literature/ Tel Aviv Univ., 1987
- S.Y. Agnon – A Writer with a Thousand Faces (Hebrew: פנים אחרות ביצירתו של ש״י עגנון). Hakibbutz Hameuchad Publishing House, 1989
- About Stories and Plays: Elements of Short Stories and Plays (Hebrew: על סיפורים ומחזות : פרקים ביסודות הסיפור והמחזה). Keter Publishing, 1992
- Literature Then, Here and Now (Hebrew: ספרות אז, כאן ועכשיו). Zmora-Bitan Publishing, 1993
- Mostly Mendele (Hebrew: מנדלי, לפניו ואחריו). The Hebrew Univ., Magnes Press, 2004
- Identity: Jewish Literatures in European Languages (Hebrew: זהות : ספרויות יהודיות בלשון לעז). Haifa Univ. Press, 2006
- Group Portrait: Aspects of Israeli Literature and Culture (Hebrew: תמונה קבוצתית : היבטים בספרות ישראל ובתרבותה). Dvir, Heksherim Institute/ Ben-Gurion Univ., 2009

== Published works (English) ==
=== Literary criticism ===
- The New Tradition: Essays on Modern Hebrew Literature. Hebrew Union College Press/ Wayne State University Press, 2006
- Modern Hebrew Fiction. Indiana University Press, 2000.* Shmuel Yosef Agnon: A Revolutionary Traditionalist. New York University Press, 1989.
- The Shadows Within: Essays on the Modern Jewish Writers. Jewish Publication Society, 1987.

=== Edited anthologies ===
- 8 Great Hebrew Short Novels. Toby Press, 2005
- Six Israeli Novellas, David R. Godine, 2002

== See also ==
- List of Israel Prize recipients
- List of Bialik Prize recipients
