= Yehezkel Kaufmann =

Israeli academic (1889–1963)

- יחזקאל קויפמן
- Picture of Yehezkel Kaufmann
- Born: 17 December 1889; Dunaivtsi, Podolia Governorate, Russian Empire
- Died: 9 October 1963 (aged 73); Jerusalem
- Awards: Bialik Prize for Jewish Thought (1933, 1956) Israel Prize in Jewish Studies (1958)

Academic background
- Education: University of Bern

Academic work
- Institutions: Hebrew University of Jerusalem
- Notable works: Exile and Estrangement (1930) The Religion of Israel (1960)

Yehezkel Kaufmann (Hebrew: יחזקאל קויפמן; also: Yeḥezqêl Qâufman; Yeḥezḳel Ḳoyfman; Jehezqël Kaufmann) (17 December 1889 – 9 October 1963) was an Israeli philosopher and Biblical scholar associated with the Hebrew University. His main contribution to the study of biblical religion was his thesis that Israel's monotheism was not a gradual development from paganism but entirely new.

== Biography ==
Yehezkel Kaufmann was born in Dunaivtsi in present-day Ukraine, then under the Russian Empire. His father, Mordekhai Nakhum Kaufmann, was a cloth merchant. He grew up in a traditional Jewish household, and he received a religious early education in a cheder. He studied Talmud in a beit midrash, and learned Hebrew, grammar, and some Hebrew literature from a private tutor. His further Talmudic knowledge was acquired at the yeshiva of Rabbi Chaim Tchernowitz (Rav Tzair) in Odessa and in Petrograd, and his philosophical and Biblical training were at the University of Berne. He completed his doctorate on "the principle of sufficient reason" in 1918, and had it published in 1920 in Berlin. He began teaching in Mandatory Palestine in 1928 and became Professor of Bible at Hebrew University in 1949.

== Primary works ==
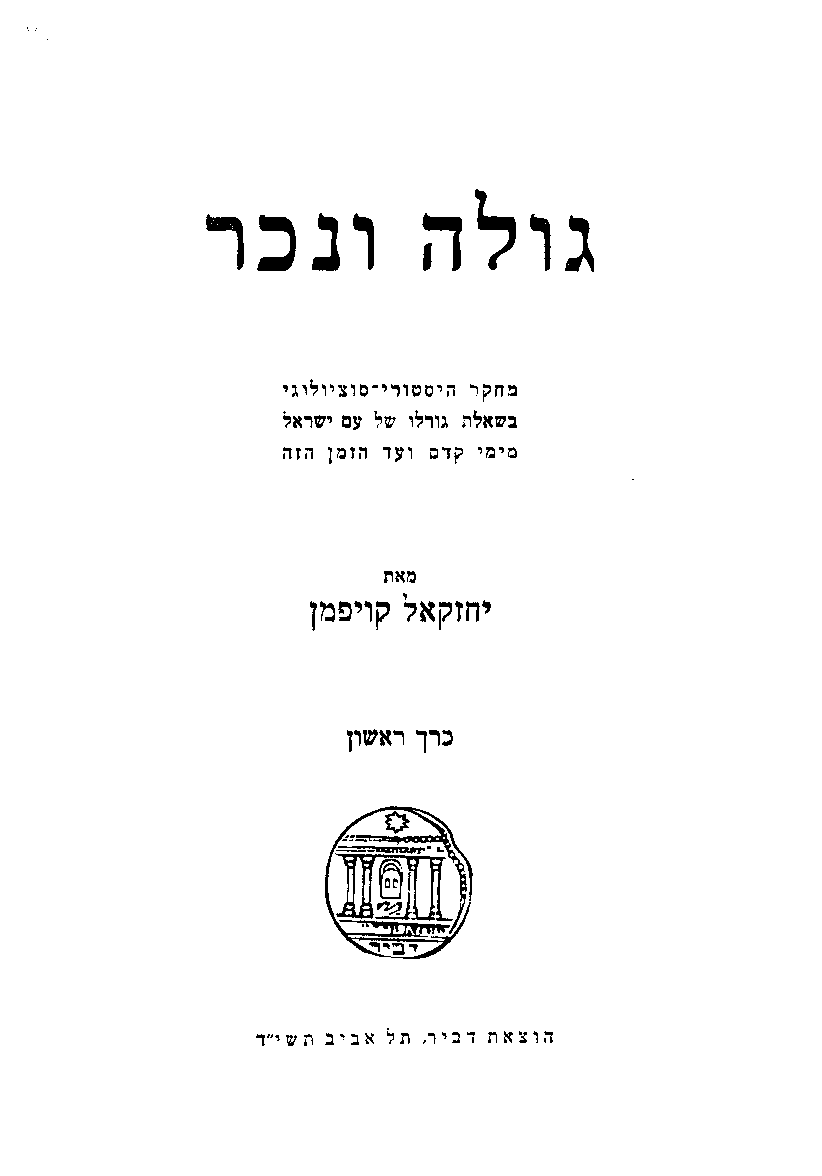
Title page from Yehezkel Kaufmann's Exile and Estrangement.

Kaufmann was the author of dozens of publications, almost exclusively in Hebrew. In 1920, he published Against the claims of the phenomenological approach of Husserl, but this was to be his last publication on abstract philosophy.

=== Exile and Estrangement ===
His first major work was Exile and Estrangement: A Socio-Historical Study on the Issue of the Fate of the Nation of Israel from Ancient Times until the Present (1930), in which he suggests that what preserved Israel's uniqueness through the ages was solely its religion. Among the basic themes of this work is that it is the tension between "universalism" and "nationalism" that comprises the foundational problem of Judaism. This tension reaches back to the earliest eras of Judaism in which a universalistic conception of God was juxtaposed with the local socio-political issues of a small tribal people, even after that people had been exiled from its homeland. YHVH is the ruler of the entire universe, but he reveals Himself and His commandments only to Israel. It is this same tension which Kaufmann traces to the more modern phenomenon of exile and ghettoization. Among Kaufmann's contentious positions were his belief that Zionism could not provide the ultimate solution to the Jewish question.

=== The Religion of Israel ===
Kaufmann's best-known work is תולדות האמונה הישראלית, (Toledot HaEmunah HaYisraelit) The Religion of Israel, from Its Beginnings to the Babylonian Exile (1960), encompassing the history of religion and Biblical literature. The work is important both because of its profound scope, and because it offered a critical approach to Biblical study which was nevertheless in opposition to the documentary hypothesis of Julius Wellhausen, which dominated Biblical study at that time (Hyatt 1961). Among Kaufmann's opinions expressed in this work are that neither a symbiotic nor syncretistic relationship obtained between the ancient Canaanites and Israelites. External influences on the Israelite religion occurred solely prior to the time of Moses. However, Monotheism – which on Kaufmann's view began at the time of Moses – was not the result of influences from any surrounding cultures, but was solely an Israelite phenomenon. After the adoption of Monotheism, Israelite belief is found to be free from mythological foundations, to the extent that the Scriptures do not even understand paganism (which, on Kauffman's view, is any religion other than Judaism, Christianity, or Islam (Hyatt 1961)). Kaufmann summed up his position in these words: "Israelite religion was an original creation of the people of Israel. It was absolutely different from anything the pagan world knew; its monotheistic world view has no antecedents in paganism."

Kaufmann posits that the occasional worship of Baal was never an organic movement of the people, but instead was only promoted by the royal court, mainly under Ahab and Jezebel. What idol-worship the Scriptures speak of was only "vestigial fetishistic idolatry," and not a genuine attachment of the people to such forms of worship, or the influence of foreign culture.

==== The apostle-prophet ====
Kaufmann sees the classical "apostle-prophet" or "messenger-prophet" of the Prophetic literature (Nevi'im) as a uniquely Israelite phenomenon, the culmination of a long process of religious development not in any way influenced by surrounding cultures. This position is in most ways quite traditional; for example, it accords well with Maimonides's statement that "Yet that an individual should make a claim to prophecy on the ground that God had spoken to him and had sent him on a mission was a thing never heard of prior to Moses our Master" (GP I:63, S. Pines, 1963). The major innovation of the prophets was thus not the creation of the religion of Israel de novo (since this had already existed, and had facilitated their own emergence), but rather the unique focus on the ethical aspect of religion, the shift in primacy from cult to morality and the insistence that the fulfillment of God's will lay in the moral domain.

==== Biblical authorship ====
Kaufmann regards the non-prophetic parts of scripture as reflecting an earlier stage of the Israelite religion. While he accepts the existence of the three primary sources JE, P, and D, he claims – in opposition to Wellhausen and others – that the P-source significantly predates the Babylonian exile and Deuteronomy. Supporting this view, according to Kaufmann, is that the P-source does not recognize centralization of the cult, and deals only with issues related to the local sacrificial rituals. He suggests that the historiographical parts of scripture did not receive the heavy editing that was posited by biblical criticism of the time.

==== Translations ====
Kaufmann's Toldot Ha'Emunah Ha'Yisraelit is a 4-volume work written in Hebrew. An accessible alternative is the one-volume English language translation and abridgement by Prof. Moshe Greenberg, entitled The Religion of Israel, by Yehezkel Kaufmann, published by the University of Chicago, 1960.

=== Biblical commentaries ===
Kaufmann wrote commentaries on the Book of Joshua and the Book of Judges.

== Other works ==
- Jesekiel Kaufmann (German name variant), Eine Abhandlung über den zureichenden Grund: Erster Teil: Der logische Grund (lit. 'A Treatise on the Sufficient Reason: Part One: The Logical Reason'), Berlin: Ebering, 1920, in German (PhD thesis, see Biography section).

== Awards and recognition ==
In 1933, Kaufmann was awarded the first Bialik Prize for Jewish thought. He was awarded the prize again in 1956.

In 1958, he was awarded the Israel Prize, in Jewish studies.

== See also ==
- List of Israel Prize recipients
- List of Bialik Prize recipients
- Umberto Cassuto scholar of Hebrew bible and Ugaritic literature
- Cyrus Gordon scholar of Near Eastern history and ancient languages, Hebrew bible
- Abraham Yahuda scholar of Ancient Egyptology and Hebrew bible
