= Lionel Leventhal =

British book publisher

Lionel Leventhal is a British publisher of books on military history and related topics, whose eponymous company was established in 1967.

== History ==
After working in a bookshop (1954–1956), Leventhal joined the publishing company of Herbert Jenkins Ltd, best known as the publisher of P. G. Wodehouse, and published his first military book in 1960. After a short time with Paul Hamlyn (1964–1966), Leventhal set up Arms & Armour Press in 1966.

Lionel Leventhal Limited came into being in 1967 as the holding company for the various publishing and other book-related companies run by its eponymous owner.

== Arms and Armour Press ==
Founded at a time when few new publishing houses were being established, Arms and Armour Press began on Leventhal's kitchen table, but grew rapidly to be one of the United Kingdom's leading publishers of militaria and military history, with a stable of authors including some of the most renowned specialists in the field, including Ian V. Hogg, David G. Chandler and Steven Zaloga. In 1984, Arms & Armour Press was sold to Link House Books, which owned seven publishers, including Blandford.

== The London Book Fair ==
In 1971, Clive Bingley and Leventhal organised The Specialist Publishers’ Exhibition for Librarians, with 22 exhibitors displaying titles on tabletops. Subsequently, they saw the Fair grow and go through a number of development and name changes, finally becoming The London Book Fair in 1977. The London Book Fair was sold in 1985 to Industrial & Trade Fairs (which later became Reed Exhibitions), by which time the number of exhibitors had increased to 520. He was video-interviewed at The London Book Fair 2017 as part of a surprise celebration of his 80th birthday.

== Ken Trotman ==
1976 saw the acquisition of Ken Trotman Limited, the leading specialist bookseller of books on militaria, which was sold to its manager, Richard Brown, in 1984.

== Greenhill Books ==
In 1984, Leventhal started a new publishing imprint, Greenhill Books. Contractually precluded from publishing any new books for a period, he started with three series of reprints of classic aviation, crime and science fiction titles. In 1985, Greenhill launched the Napoleonic Library series of classic military reprints and soon abandoned fiction publishing to concentrate on military history. As with Arms & Armour Press, the imprint grew, eventually reaching a total of almost 700 titles published and attracting a renowned group of authors, including Chaim Herzog, John Elting and Kenneth Macksey. Additionally, the company undertook European and Commonwealth distribution for a number of overseas military history publishers. Lionel Leventhal's son, Michael, joined Greenhill Books in January 2003 and become a Director the following year. In 2007, Greenhill Books split, with contracted but as yet unpublished titles passing to Frontline Books, an imprint of Pen & Sword Books. Lists distributed on behalf of overseas publishers became the basis of a new company, Casemate UK. Lionel Leventhal Limited retains ownership of stocks and copyright licences of books published under the Greenhill Books and Chatham Publishing imprint.

The only new Greenhill Book between 2007 and 2016 was The Hand of History, a compilation of history quotes and commentaries raising money for Parkinson's UK. The book is edited by Michael Leventhal and includes contributions from Antony Beevor, Asa Briggs, Tim Newark, Richard Holmes, Gary Sheffield, Ian Kershaw, Stephen Turnbull and illustrations by Chris Riddell.

In 2017, Greenhill Books began publishing new military history books with new work by J. P. Cross, John Hussey, Anthony Rogers, Peter G. Tsouras and Martin Pegler. In 2018 Greenhill Books published the first English language translation of the memoir of the Russian sniper Lyudmila Pavlichenko and the memoir of Elena Rzhevskaya, the Russian SMERSH agent who found Hitler's teeth in the Berlin bunker in 1945. To celebrate the 75th anniversary of the PoW breakout from Stalag Luft III in March 1944, the mass escape which inspired the film The Great Escape, Greenhill Books published new editions of the memoirs of the successful escapees Bram Vanderstok (also known as Bram van der Stok) and Jens Müller.

== Griffin ==
In 1985 Leventhal purchased, with partner Clive Bingley, the STM publishing house of Charles Griffin, which specialised in publishing books on statistics. Griffin was sold 18 months later to Hodder Arnold.

== Lund Humphries Publishers ==
In 1985, Leventhal and Bingley, also purchased Lund Humphries Publishers. Lund Humphries began life as part of the Bradford printing company Percy Lund, Humphries & Co, formed in 1895, but became a specialist publisher of contemporary British art and sculpture subjects. Leventhal's partner retired in 1992 and Lund Humphries Publishers was sold in 1999 to Ashgate.

== Chatham Publishing ==
In 2003, Lionel Leventhal Limited acquired the leading specialist publishing house for naval and maritime books, Chatham Publishing, which had been established in 1996 and had a fine reputation for high-quality publications. In 2007, with the breakup of Greenhill Books, contracted but as yet unpublished titles passed to Seaforth Publishing, an imprint of Pen & Sword Books. Lionel Leventhal Limited retains ownership of stocks and copyright licences of books published under the Chatham imprint.

== Green Bean Books ==
In 2018, Michael Leventhal established a new imprint publishing Jewish children's books. To date, the imprint has published fifteen books, including modern works by Shira Geffen, David Polonsky, Rinat Hoffer, Ori Elon, and Shoham Smith. The imprint has also published updated works by noted Yiddish writers Isaac Bashevis Singer and I. L. Peretz. Interviewed by The Bookseller magazine at the Bologna Book Fair in April 2019, Michael Leventhal noted the children's imprint "was a certainly a change from the Battle of the Bulge and books about snipers". Michael Leventhal was interviewed for the WorldKidLit blog in September 2020 about the birth of the Green Bean Books imprint.

In March 2021, Green Bean Books launched a new book award celebrating Jewish history, festival and values, working in conjunction with Jewish Book Week. The winners of the award were announced in March 2022. The winner of the illustration prize was Sharon Spitz and the winner of the writing prize was Carol Isaacs. The award was repeated in 2023 and the winner of the text award was Dina Leifer, and the winner of the illustration award was Mel Zohar. A third competition was launched in April 2023. and the winners were announced in March 2024: the story winner prize was won by Berliner Julie Form, and the illustration prize was won by Ukrainian-born Julia Krasovitsky. Both winners live in Germany. A fourth competition was launched by Green Bean Books and the Jewish Literary Foundation in April 2024. A fifth and final competition was launched in May 2025.

== Bibliography ==
- Lionel Leventhal, On Publishing: A Professional Memoir, London: Greenhill Books, 2002. ISBN 978-1-85367-517-1.

Reviews

Napoleonic Series website, 27 May 2002; Publishers Weekly, 17 June 2002.
