= Avraham Grossman =

Israeli historian (1936–2024)

- אברהם גרוסמן
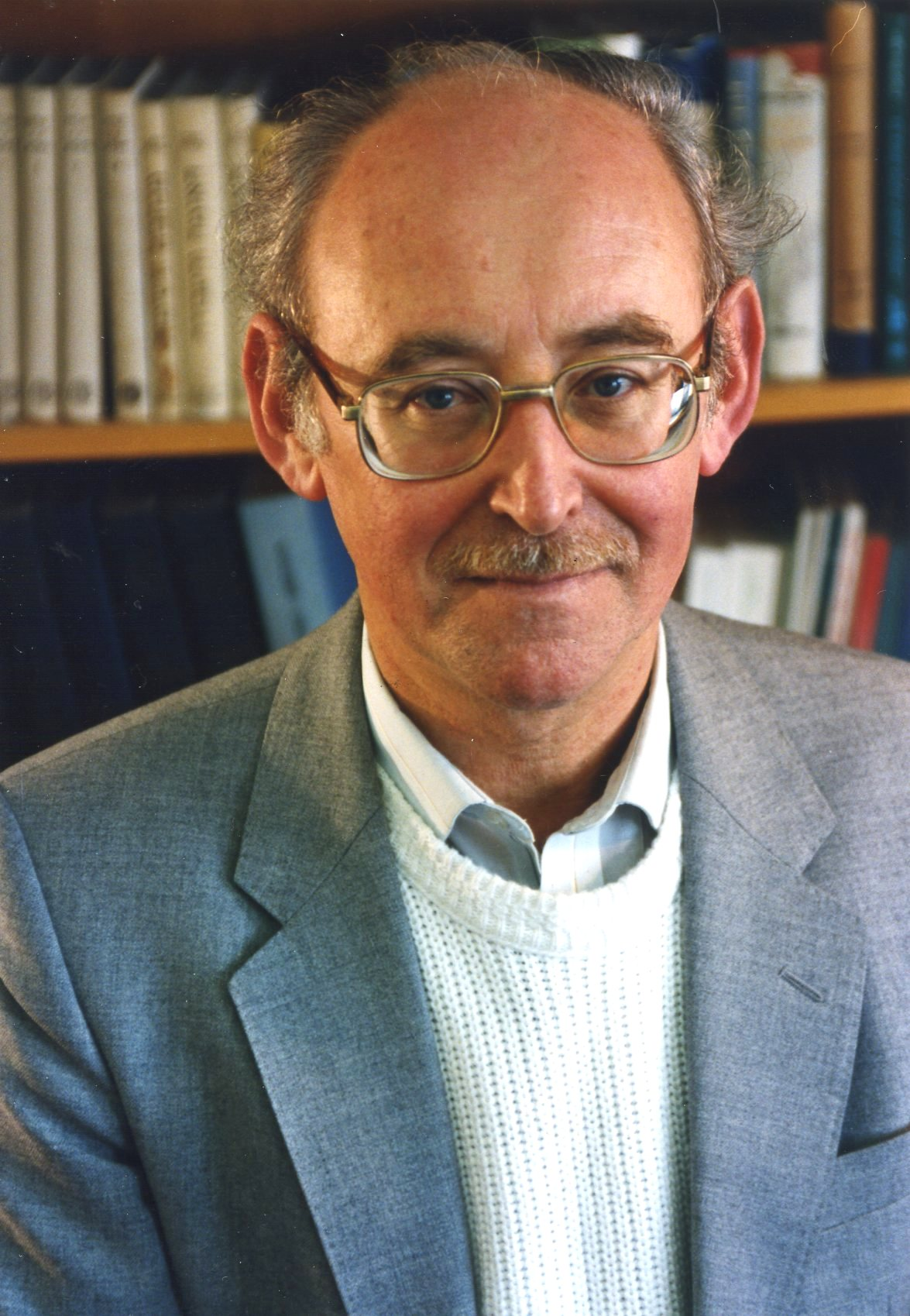
- Born: 10 March 1936; Tiberias, Mandatory Palestine
- Died: 27 March 2024 (aged 88); Israel

Avraham Grossman (Hebrew: אברהם גרוסמן; 10 March 1936 – 27 March 2024) was an Israeli historian and professor in the Jewish history department at the Hebrew University of Jerusalem, recipient of the 2003 Israel Prize for his contributions to Jewish history.

== Biography ==
Avraham Grossman was born on 10 March 1936, in Tiberias, and grew up in Mishmar HaYarden.

In 1948 his family moved to Haifa. He served in the Education and Youth Corps of the Israel Defense Forces.

After his military service, he started his studies in the Hebrew University of Jerusalem in Jewish history and Talmud for his bachelor's and master's degrees, respectively. His master's thesis was about Gershom ben Judah and was supervised by Ephraim Urbach. His doctoral work, The Rabbinical literature of Ashkenaz and Northern France in the eleventh century, was also supervised by Urbach. Grossman got his doctorate in 1974 and moved to London for a postdoc at SOAS, University of London, and manuscript research in the Bodleian Library.

Grossman was appointed lecturer in the Hebrew University of Jerusalem in 1976 and full professor in 1986. From 1991 to 1992 he was the head of the Jewish history department. In 2007 he became professor emeritus.

Grossman was a visiting professor at Harvard University, Ohio State University and Yale University in the years 1985, 1986 and 1988 respectively.

Grossman was married to Rachel from 1961 until his death, and had four children. One of them is a professor in the Bible department of Bar-Ilan University.

Grossman was a member of the Israel Academy of Sciences and Humanities.

Grossman won the Bialik Prize in 1996 for his book The Early Sages of France.

Avraham Grossman died on 27 March 2024, at the age of 88.
