= Abraham Kahana =

Russian-born biblical scholar

- אברהם כהנא
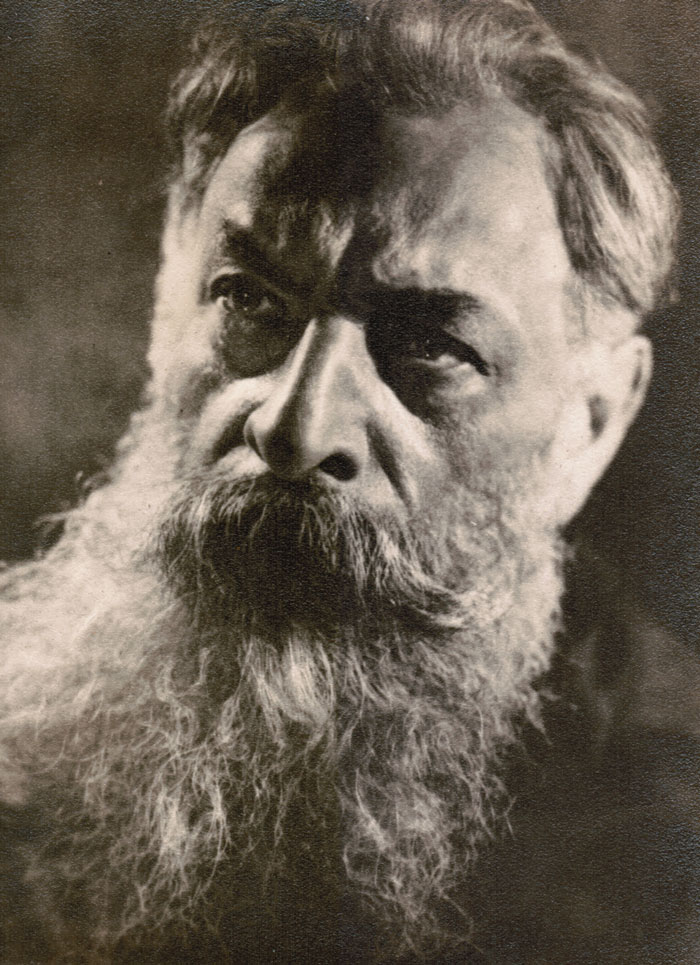
- Born: 19 December 1874; Skomorokhy, Volhynia, Russian Empire
- Died: 20 February 1946 (aged 71); Tel Aviv, Mandatory Palestine
- Resting place: Trumpeldor Cemetery
- Occupations: Biblical scholar; biographer; historian; translator; librarian
- Spouse: Hanna Sheptal
- Children: Uriel Kahana
- Writing career
- Notable awards: Bialik Prize (1937)

Abraham Kahana (Hebrew: אברהם כהנא, Russian: Авраам Маркович Каган; 19 December 1874 – 20 February 1946) was a Russian-born Biblical scholar, biographer, historian, translator, and librarian.

== Biography ==
Abraham ben Mordechai Kahana was born in the town of Skomorokhy, near Zhytomyr. Though he received a traditional Jewish education, he was largely self-educated. He was appointed professor at the University of Kiev following the October Revolution, before emigrating to Warsaw with his family in 1922, and the following year to Mandatory Palestine, which he had first visited in 1914.

He settled in Tel Aviv, where he directed the Sha'ar Tzion Library and taught at the Levinsky Seminary, before devoting himself entirely to research in 1929. He focused especially on the editing, annotation, and translation into Hebrew of Jewish apocrypha, publishing these texts through his publishing house Mekorot. He was awarded the Bialik Prize eight years later for these efforts.

He died in 1946, and is buried alongside his wife at Trumpeldor Cemetery. His personal library was bequeathed to the Hebrew University of Jerusalem, while his correspondences are held at the National Library of Israel.

== Work ==
Abraham Kahana's interests were wide and varied, from biblical exegesis to linguistics and the history of Hasidism. Some of his earlier works include an anthology of S. D. Luzzatto's letters, translated from the Italian into Hebrew (Odessa, 1896); Devar Shmuel (Kraków, 1896), a collection of letters from Samuel Vita Lolli to Luzzatto and I. S. Reggio, with the replies of Reggio and a biography of Lolli by Castiglioni; a Hebrew biography of Moses Ḥayyim Luzzatto (Warsaw, 1898); Korot ha-Yehudim be-Roma (Warsaw, 1901); Dikduk lashon Ivrit, after Luzzatto's Hebrew grammar (Warsaw, 1901); and Rabbi Yisrael Ba'al Shem-Tov (Zhytomyr, 1901).

From 1903, he was the editor of a critical commentary, in Hebrew, on the Tanakh, to which he contributed commentaries and introductions to Genesis, Exodus, Numbers, Job, Proverbs, Ecclesiastes, and Ezra–Nehemiah. He published the first edition of his bilingual Russian-Hebrew dictionary in 1907, and a study of Rashi's commentaries a year later. His Sefer Ha-hassidut, a collection of biographies, teachings and anecdotes, was published in Warsaw in 1922.

Kahana was also a frequent contributor to the Hebrew periodicals Ha-Melitz, Ha-Zman, and Ha-Shiloaḥ, and was the editor of the literary reviews in Ha-Dor.
