= Moshe Zvi Segal =

- משה צבי סגל
- Born: 23 September 1875; Maishad, Kovno Governorate, Russian Empire
- Died: 11 January 1968 (aged 92); Kfar Saba, Israel
- Occupations: Rabbi; Linguist; Talmudic scholar
- Awards: Bialik Prize for Jewish Thought (1936, 1950); Israel Prize for Jewish studies (1954)

Moshe Zvi (Hirsch) Segal (Hebrew: משה צבי סגל; born 23 September 1875; died 11 January 1968) was an Israeli rabbi, linguist and Talmudic scholar.

== Biography ==
Segal was born in Maishad, present-day Lithuania (then part of the Russian Empire) in 1875. In 1896, he moved with his family to Scotland and subsequently to London. He was ordained as a rabbi in 1902 and later obtained a degree from Oxford University. He was the Rabbi of the United Hebrew Congregation of Newcastle upon Tyne from 1910 to 1918, when he went to the British Mandate of Palestine as a member of the Zionist Commission with Chaim Weizmann.

== Academic career ==
In 1926 he was appointed lecturer at the Hebrew University, where he was promoted to a chair in Bible and Semitic languages in 1939.

== Awards and recognition ==
- In 1936 (jointly with Raphael Patai) and again in 1950, Segal was awarded the Bialik Prize for Jewish Thought.
- In 1954, he was awarded the Israel Prize, for Jewish studies.

== See also ==
- List of Israel Prize recipients
- List of Bialik Prize recipients
