= Ya'akov Cahan =

Writer from Israel (1881–1960)

- יעקב כהן
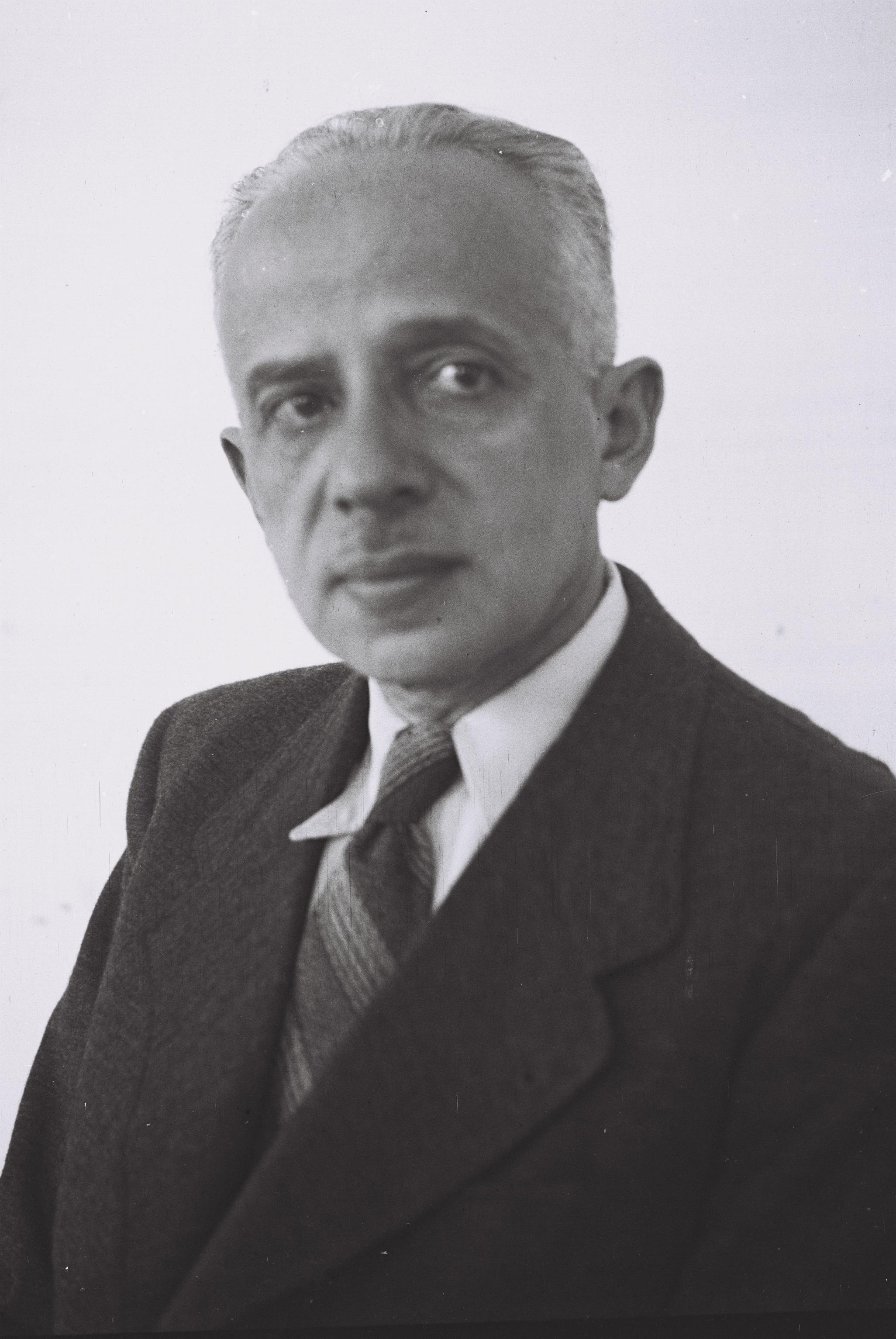
- Born: June 26, 1881; Slutsk, Minsk Governorate, Russian Empire (now in Belarus)
- Died: November 20, 1960 (aged 79); Tel Aviv, Israel
- Citizenship: Israeli
- Occupation: writer
- Writing career
- Language: Hebrew
- Notable awards: Bialik Prize (1938); Israel Prize (1953 and 1958)

Ya'akov Cahan or Kahan (Hebrew: יעקב כהן, born 26 June 1881; died 20 November 1960) was an Israeli poet, playwright, translator, writer and Hebrew linguist.

== Biography ==
Ya'akov Cahan was born in Slutsk, in the Russian Empire, now Belarus. He immigrated to the British Mandate of Palestine in 1934.

== Awards ==
- In 1938, Cahan was awarded the Bialik Prize for Literature.
- In 1953 and again in 1958, he was awarded the Israel Prize for literature.
- In 1956, he received the Tchernichovsky Prize for exemplary translation, for translations from German of the first part of Goethe's Faust and other works by Goethe (Torquato Tasso and Iphigenia in Tauris), as well as a selection of poems by Heinrich Heine.

== See also ==
- List of Israel Prize recipients
- List of Bialik Prize recipients
