= Moshe Zilberg =

Moshe Zilberg משה זילברג
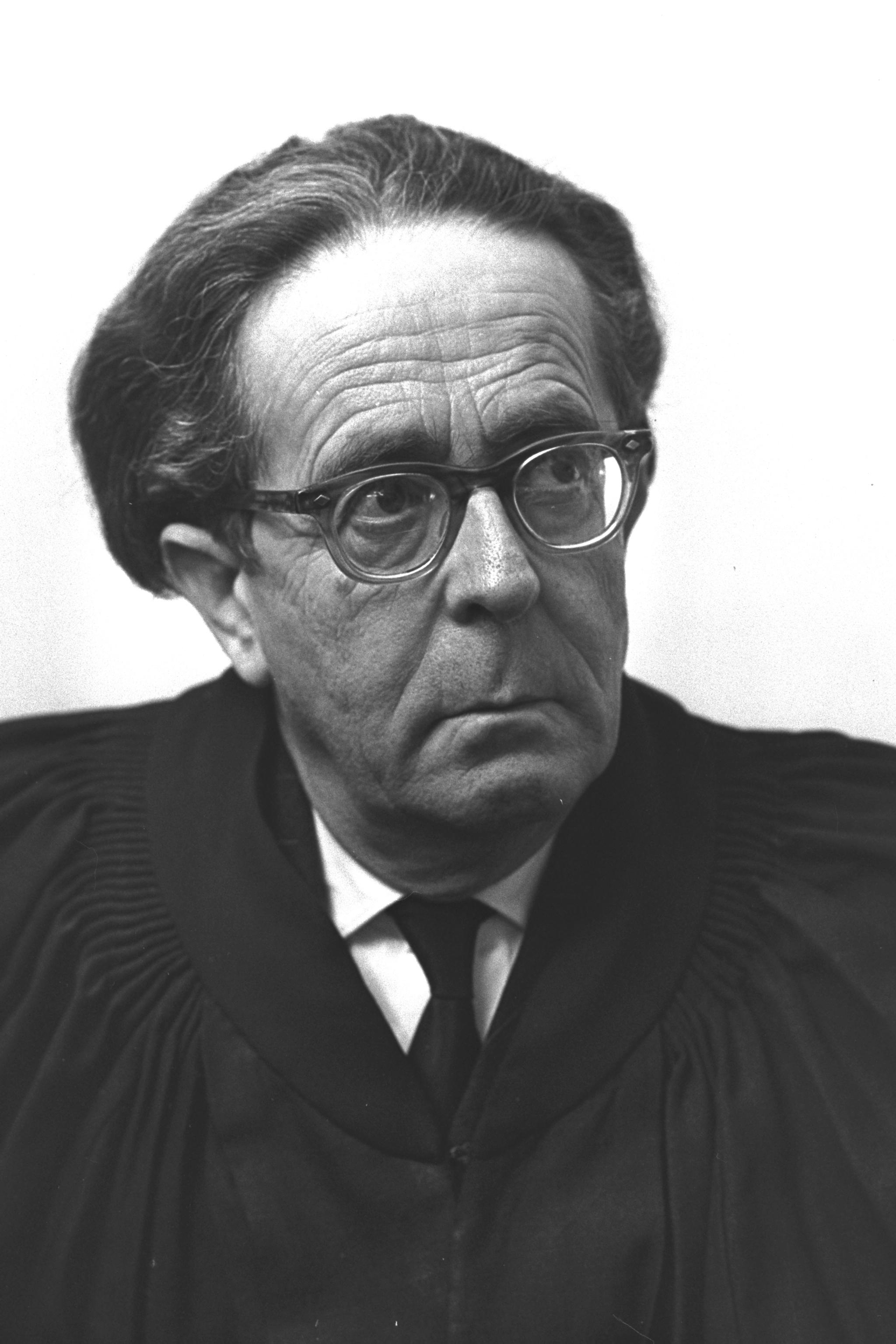
- Born: 16 September 1900; Skaudvilė, Kovno Governorate, Russian Empire
- Died: 4 June 1975 (aged 74); Israel
- Citizenship: Israeli
- Occupation: jurist
- Writing career
- Language: Hebrew
- Notable awards: Israel Prize (1964)

Moshe Zilberg (Hebrew: משה זילברג; 1900–1975) was a leading Israeli jurist.

== Biography ==
Zilberg was born on 16 September 1900 in Skaudvilė in present-day Lithuania, then part of the Russian Empire. He studied at various yeshivot, including Kelm, Mir, Slabodka and Novardok, and appeared to be somewhat of a prodigy. In 1920, he moved to Frankfurt, Germany and completed his general studies. The following year, he began studying philosophy at the University of Marburg and then law at Frankfurt University.

In 1929, Zilberg emigrated to Mandate Palestine. From 1929 to 1948, he worked as a lawyer in private practice. He also taught at a Tel Aviv high school. As a result of his relationship with Hayim Nahman Bialik, he was a lecturer at the Ohel Shem Association from 1931 to 1948, the title of his lectures being "Talmud for the People".

With establishment of the State of Israel, Zilberg was appointed to the District Court in Tel Aviv. In 1950, he was appointed as a Supreme Court judge, and continued in such capacity until retiring from the bench in 1970, having reached the position as vice-president of the court. He was also a professor of law at the Hebrew University of Jerusalem. Following his retirement from the bench, he devoted himself to writing articles on law, halacha and other issues.

== Awards and honours ==
- In 1964, Zilberg was awarded the Israel Prize for Jurisprudence.
- In 1958, he received the Bialik Prize for Jewish thought.

== See also ==
- List of Bialik Prize recipients
- List of Israel Prize recipients
