= Jonathan Garb =

Israeli scholar of Kabbalah (born 1967)

Jonathan Garb (Hebrew: יהונתן גארב, born 1967) is an Israeli scholar of Kabbalah. He is holder of the Gershom Scholem chair in Kabbalah (together with Prof. Yehuda Liebes) in the Department of Jewish Thought at the Hebrew University of Jerusalem.

== Biography ==
Jonathan Garb was born in 1967 in Johannesburg, South Africa, and immigrated to Israel in 1973. In the 1980s, Garb studied Talmud and Kabbalah in the Lithuanian Yeshiva world, where he also studied Mussar with R. Shlomo Wolbe and R. Reuven Leuchter. He also studied Kabbalah with Rabbi Eliezer Zvi Safrin of Komarno and Rabbi Yitzchak Meir Morgenstern. He later studied Talmud with Rabbi Professor David Weiss Halivni. He earned his B.A., M.A., and Ph.D. degrees at the Hebrew University between the years 1990 to 2001, his M.A. and Ph.D. dissertations were advised by Prof. Moshe Idel. He was a post-doctoral fellow at Ben Gurion University of the Negev. He served as a guest lecturer at the L’École des hautes études en sciences sociales in Paris. In 2010, Garb received the Hebrew University President’s Prize for Outstanding Researcher (Ben Porat/Pollack Family Foundation). During the academic year 2011-2012, he was fellow at the Tikvah Center for Law and Jewish Civilization at New York University. He was head of the Amirim Honors Program in the years 2013-2014. In 2014, he received the Israel Academy of Science and Humanities' Gershom Scholem Prize for Kabbalah Research. Between 2012 and 2022, he was a member of the editorial board of Kabbalah: Journal for the Study of Jewish Mystical Texts.. Currently he is co-editor of Tarbiz; A Quarterly for Jewish Studies and a member of the editorial board of the Journal of Jewish Thought and Philosophy. In 2019 and 2022, he was a fellow at the Maimonides Center for Advanced Studies at University of Hamburg.

== Scholarship ==
Garb’s research interests cover rabbinic thought, modern and contemporary Kabbalah, and the comparative study of mystical techniques and experiences, particularly Shamanism and Trance. From a geographical point of view, Garb’s scholarship has focused on Jerusalem, North Africa, and Prague. Recently, he focuses on Italy, particularly on the circle of R. Moshe Hayyim Luzzatto. He claims that other members of the circle may have written many texts attributed to Luzzatto. His research strongly draws from post-modern theory, especially the work of Michel Foucault and its antecedents. Following the phenomenological approach of his main teacher, Jonathan Garb is considered one of the leading students of Moshe Idel. As such, he has been critiqued — among others by Peter Schäfer — as using “academic scholarship and its results as building blocks for a new, postmodern mystical Jewish religion.” Garb’s monographic studies significantly exceed the dominant philological-historical approach in the study of Jewish mystical texts applied by Gershom Scholem and his followers. In his Manifestations of Power in Jewish Mysticism, Garb offers a Foucauldian reading of rabbinic thought and earlier Kabbalah. The Chosen Will Become Herds “examines twentieth-century Kabbalah in its Israeli and global context, drawing from an impressive range of Hasidic, Lithuanian, Oriental-Sephardic, and Religious Zionist sources.” It is considered as one of the most comprehensive studies of modern and contemporary Kabbalah to date. Garb’s third monograph, Shamanic Trance in Modern Kabbalah, offers an Ericksonian reading of sixteenth century Kabbalistic writings and Hasidic literature. His fourth monograph is an intellectual biography of the eighteenth-century Italian kabbalist R. Moshe Hayyim Luzzatto. His fifth book covers 'indigenous' psychological theories found in modern Kabbalah from R. Moshe Cordovero till today, focusing on the heart and soul. In his monograph, Modern Kabbalah as an Autonomous Domain of Research, Garb argues that modern Kabbalistic writings can be shown to reflect a strong awareness of its autonomy from pre-modern sources and practices. His seventh book, A History of Kabbalah: From the Early Modern Period to the Present Day, provides a narrative history of modern Kabbalah, stressing its exposure to the process of modernization and its role in the same process. Focusing on the last three centuries, it exposes numerous unknown texts, especially in the Sephardic world. In 2021, Garb received the Polonsky Prize for Creativity and Originality in the Humanistic Disciplines for this book. His eighth book, Does God Doubt: R. Gershon Henoch Leiner’s Thought in Its Contexts (Brill, 2024), places the positive views of doubt in the works of a nineteenth-century Hasidic thinker in the Jewish and extra-Jewish context of attitudes towards this and related themes. In dozens of articles, he has discussed issues such as perceptions of medicine, gender, language, antinomianism, time, doubt, poetics, magic, and sainthood. Besides his academic writing, Garb has published essays in Hebrew on social critique, the New Age, and the contemporary Haredi world.

== Works ==
Manifestations of Power in Jewish Mysticism: From Rabbinic Literature to Safedian Kabbalah. Jerusalem: Magnes Press, 2005 [Hebrew] (http://www.magnespress.co.il/website_en/index.asp?category=231&id=2551).

The Chosen Will Become Herds: Studies in Twentieth Century Kabbalah. New Haven and London: Yale University Press, 2009 (http://yalepress.yale.edu/yupbooks/book.asp?isbn=9780300123944).

Shamanic Trance in Modern Kabbalah. Chicago and London: The University of Chicago Press, 2011 (http://press.uchicago.edu/ucp/books/book/chicago/S/bo10968269.html).

Kabbalist in the Heart of the Storm: R. Moshe Hayyim Luzzatto. Tel Aviv: Tel Aviv University Press, 2014 [Hebrew] (http://www.taupress.tau.ac.il/).

Yearnings of the Soul: Psychological Thought in Modern Kabbalah. Chicago and London: The University of Chicago Press, 2015 (http://press.uchicago.edu/ucp/books/book/chicago/Y/bo21386454.html).

Modern Kabbalah as an Autonomous Domain of Research. Los Angeles: Cherub Press, 2016 (http://cherub-press.com).

A History of Kabbalah from the Early Modern Period to the Present Day. Cambridge University Press, 2020 (https://www.cambridge.org/core/books/history-of-kabbalah/3F6F6FDE909F145B29F4965EE7323814)

Does God Doubt: R. Gershon Henoch Leiner’s Thought in Its Contexts https://brill.com/display/title/64909?language=en&srsltid=AfmBOortqpA1kJfloZePSxmejMnaN4Fg_4y7ncmzHYlC3qfUWluchAGI
