= Kobyletska Poliana =

Rural settlement in Zakarpattia Oblast, Ukraine

Kobyletska Poliana Кобилецька Поляна Gyertyánliget (in Hungarian) Poľana Kobilská (in Slovak) Poiana Cobilei (in Romanian) פּאליען-קאבילצקי (in Yiddish)
- Rural settlement
- Location within Zakarpattia Oblast Location within Ukraine
- Coordinates: 48°03′27″N 24°04′02″E
- Country: Ukraine
- Oblast: Zakarpattia Oblast
- Raion: Rakhiv Raion
- First mentioned: 1672
- Town status: 1971
- Elevation: 413 m (1,355 ft)

Population (2022)
  - Total: ▼3,480
- Time zone: UTC+2 (EET)
  - Summer (DST): UTC+3 (EEST)
- Postal code: 90620
- Area code: +380 3132
- Website: http://rada.gov.ua/

Kobyletska Poliana (Ukrainian: Кобилецька Поляна; Hungarian: Kabola Polyána before 1899 or Hungarian: Gyertyánliget after 1899; Yiddish: פּאליען-קאבילצקי, Russian: Кобылецкая Поляна, Slovak: Kobylecká Poľana) is a rural settlement in Rakhiv Raion, Zakarpattia Oblast, western Ukraine. The town's population was 3,392 as of the 2001 Ukrainian Census. Current population: 3,480 (2022 estimate).

== History ==
The settlement was first mentioned in 1672 as Kabola Poliana (Ukrainian: Кабола Поляна). In 1891, the population of the town was 1,406 and consisted of Hungarians and Rusyns. In 1910, the settlement was a part of the Kingdom of Hungary, and had a population of 1,832 inhabitants, a mixture of Rusyns, Hungarians, and Germans. In 1941, the town's Jewish population was 427. In 1971, Kobyletska Poliana was granted the status of an urban-type settlement.

On 26 January 2024, a new law entered into force which abolished the status of an urban-type settlement, and Kobyletska Poliana became a rural settlement.

The town once housed the Church of the Ascension of the Lord, a wooden church dating back to the 16th century. A sign next to the building stated that a wooden bell tower was constructed next to the church in 1512. The church was destroyed by an act of vandalism in 1992.

== People from Kobyletska Poliana ==
- Yosyp Bokshay (1891-1975), Ukrainian Soviet painter, awarded the Meritorious Patron of the Arts (1951), member of the Academy of Arts of the USSR (1958), People's Artist of Ukraine (1960), People's Artist of the USSR (1963).
- David Weiss Halivni (1927), American-Israeli rabbi, scholar in the domain of Jewish Sciences and professor of Talmud.
