= Getzel Kressel =

- גצל קרסל
- Born: 12 June 1911; Zablotov, Galicia, Austria-Hungary
- Died: 9 September 1986 (aged 75); Holon, Israel
- Spouse: Izah Perlis
- Writing career
- Language: Hebrew, Yiddish
- Notable awards: Ussishkin Prize (1963); Bialik Prize (1968)

Elyakim Getzel Kressel (Hebrew: אליקים גצל קרסל; 12 June 1911 – 9 September 1986) was an Israeli bibliographer and writer.

== Biography ==
Getzel Kressel was born in Zablotov, Galicia (now Zabolotiv, Ukraine) in 1911, and immigrated to the Mandatory Palestine in 1930.

He served as editor of Davar and for the Am Oved publishing house between 1945 and 1951. He was also a founder and director of the Hebrew Writers Association's Genazim Biobibliographical Institute.

Kressel's most important publication was Leksikon ha-Sifrut ha-Ivrit ba-Dorot ha-Aḥaronim ('Lexicon of Hebrew Literature in Recent Times'), published in two volumes in 1965 and 1967.
