= Yehoshua Bar-Yosef =

Israeli author

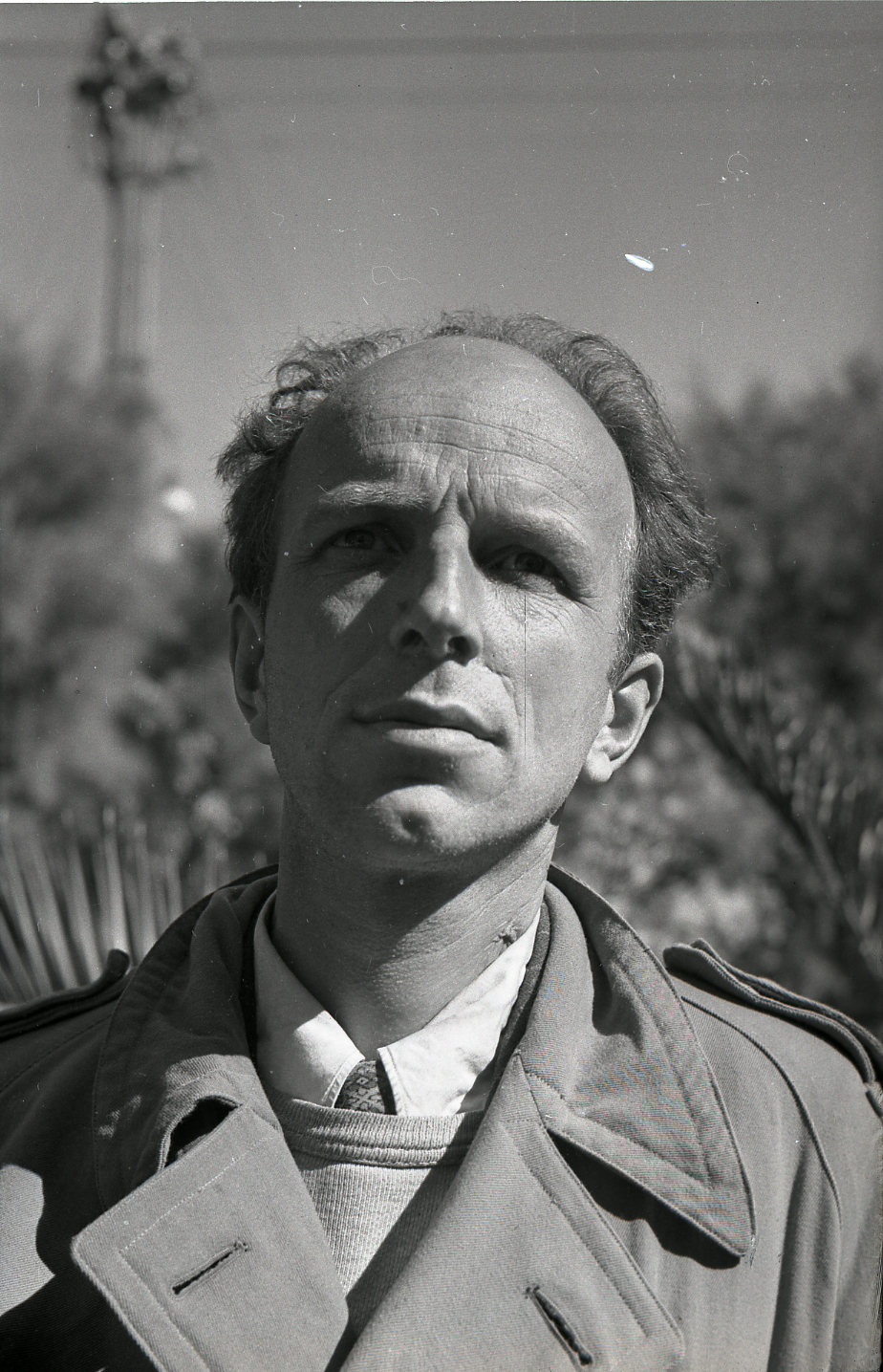
Bar-Yosef in 1948

Yehoshua Bar-Yosef (Hebrew: יהושע בר-יוסף; b. 29 May 1912 d. 7 October 1992) was an Israeli writer.

Bar-Yosef was born in Safed, Ottoman Empire and was raised in a Haredi Jewish family. He later left Orthodox Judaism and became a writer. He worked first as a newspaper editor, and then as a freelance journalist. His work includes novels, novellas, short stories, plays and historical epics about Safed. He received numerous literary awards, including the Bialik Prize in 1984.

== Books published in Hebrew ==
- The Voice of Passion (stories), Kiryat Sefer, 1937; Gazit, 1939 [Kol Ha-Yetzarim]
- A Whole Month (play), Mishkan, 1938 [Yerah Yamim]
- The Fallen Barrier (novella), Gazit, 1940 [Homah She-Naflah]
- Mother of Daughters (novel), Massada/Bialik Institute, 1943; Ma`ariv 1988 [Em Ha-Banot]
- The Alleys of Jerusalem (play), Achiasaf, 1941 [Be-Simataot Yerushalayim]
- A Meeting in Spring, Twersky, 1947 [Pegisha Ba-Aviv]
- A Boy in the Street (story), Hakibbutz Hameuachad, 1945 [Yeled Ba-Rechov]
- From a Mother`s Body (stories), Adi, 1945 [Me-Gufa Shel Em]
- Stories from Me`ah She`arim, Ofer, 1946 [Me-Sipurei Meah Shearim]
- The New House (stories), Sifriat Poalim, 1946 [Ha-Bait Ha-Hadash]
- My Husband, the Minister (play), Twersky, 1950 [Ba`ali Ha-Minister]
- Magic City (novel), Twersky, 1949 [Ir Kesumah]
- Hakibbutz Hameuchad, 1979
- On the Threshold (novel), Twersky, 1953 [Ha-Omdim Al Ha-Saf]
- Sword of Salvation (novel), Ministry of Defense, 1966 [Herev Yieshuit]
- Tabernacle of Peace (novel), Am Oved, 1958; Ma`ariv, 1988 [Sukat Shalom]
- Ma`ariv, 1988
- The Three that Left (novel), Massada, 1963 [Shlosha She-Azvu]
- People of Beit Rimon (stories), Amichai, 1958; Ma`ariv 1988 [Anshei Bait Rimon]
- The Secret of a Woman (stories), Am Oved, 1957 [Sodah Shel Ishah]
- The Way to the Red Rock (stories), The Author, 1959 [Ba-Derech La-Sela Ha—Adom]
- Upon Thy Walls, O Jerusalem (play), Renaissance, 1967 [Al Homotaich Yerushalayim]
- Between Safed and Jerusalem (autobiography), Bialik Institute, 1972; Ma`ariv, 1992 [Ben Tzfat L`Yerushalayim]
- Soul Mate (novella), Hakibbutz Hameuchad, 1979 [Ahavat Nefesh]
- The Fourth Photograph (novel), Yachdav, 1980; Ma`ariv, 1991 [Ha-Photograph Ha-Revi`i]
- A Guide for Confused Patriots (non-fiction), Hadar, 1984 [Moreh Derech Le-Patriotim Nevochim]
- Tales of Safed, Tales of Jerusalem (stories), Keter, 1984 [Mi-Sipurei Tzfat, Mi-Sipurei Yerushalayim]
- A Heretic Despite Himself (novel), Keter, 1985 [Apikores Beal Korho]
- Let There Be Light (stories), Hadar, 1985 [Va-Yehi Or]
- Three Ways (novel), Keter, 1986 [Be-Shalosh Drachim]
- The Infant from Bar`am (novel), Hadar, 1987 [Ha-Yenuka Mi-Bar`am]
- A Hungry Man`s Tale (stories), Ma`ariv, 1988 [Sipuro Shel Adam Raev]
- On The Way Back (novel), Keter, 1988 [Ba-Derech Hazarah]
- The Fish and the Dove (novel), Ma`ariv, 1989 [Ha-Dag Ve-Ha-Yonah]
- Utopia in Blue and White (novel), Ma`ariv, 1990 [Utopia Be-Kahol Lavan]
- Burnt Matches (novel), Ma`ariv, 1991 [Gafrurim Serufim]
- Seed of Everlasting Life (novel), Ma`ariv, 1992 [Zera Shel Kiama]
- Parchment and Flesh (novel), Ma`ariv, 1993 [Gevilim U-Besarim]

== Performed plays ==
- Guardians of the Walls [Ohel-1948]
- My Husband the Minister [Hamatateh-1950]
- Vote For Agassi [Hamatateh-1950]
- It Happened in Tel Aviv [Hamateteh-1951]
- Saturday in Tiberias [Hamatateh-1952]
- Laugh Beloved Land [Hamatateh-1954]
- Until One Hundred and Ninety [Hamatateh-1966]
- Peace, Peace, But There Is No Peace [Habimah-1973]

== Books in translation ==
- Hissda Goes Up the Mountain, English: New York, World Zionist Organization, 1972
- Soul Mate, Italian: Florence, Giuntina, 1999; reprint forthcoming
