= Isaac Dov Berkowitz =

Israeli author and translator (1885–1967)

- יצחק דב ברקוביץ
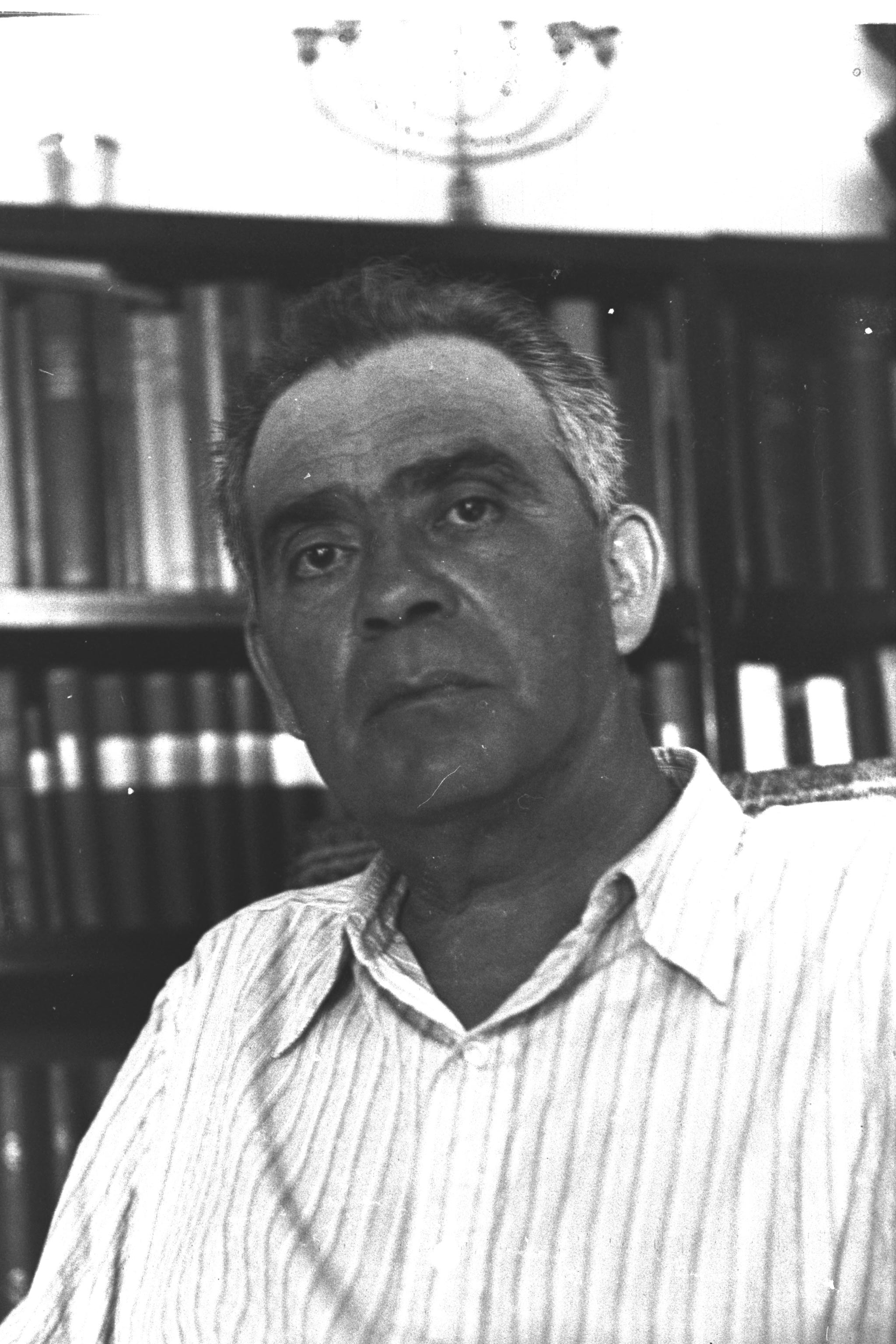
- Born: October 1885; Slutsk, Minsk Governorate, Russian Empire
- Died: 29 March 1967 (aged 81); Tel Aviv, Israel
- Occupations: Author, translator

Isaac Dov Berkowitz (Hebrew: יצחק דב ברקוביץ; 16 October 1885 – 29 March 1967), was a Hebrew and Yiddish author and translator.

== Biography ==
Isaac Dov Berkowitz was born in Slutsk in the Russian Empire. He immigrated to the United States in 1913 before moving permanently to Mandatory Palestine in 1928.

Berkowitz's first short story, "On the eve of Yom Kippur" (Hebrew: בערב יום הכיפורים, romanized: Be-Erev Yom haKipur), was published in the Warsaw newspaper HaTzofe in 1903. In 1905, Berkowitz moved to Vilna, where he worked as an editor for the Hebrew newspaper HaZman. He met and later married Sholem Aleichem's daughter, Esther, in 1906.

In 1910, Berkowitz published his first Collected Stories, and soon after that, he began to translate Sholem Aleichem's writings from Yiddish into Modern Hebrew. Two years later, he translated Leo Tolstoy's Childhood from Russian into Hebrew. Berkowitz emigrated to the United States in 1913, on the eve of World War I. From 1916 to 1919, he edited HaToren (The Mast), a Zionist-oriented periodical of high literary quality, and in 1919 he edited the short-lived journal Miklat (shelter, asylum, refuge or haven).

After arriving in Palestine in 1928, he co-edited Moznayim, the weekly literary organ of the Hebrew Writers Association, with Yeruham Fishel Lachower. He also adapted several of Sholem Aleichem's plays for Habima Theatre.

== Awards ==
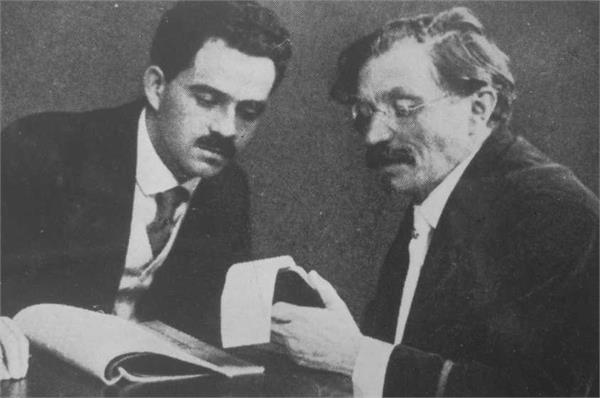
Berkowitz with Scholem Aleichem

- In 1944, Berkowitz was awarded the Tchernichovsky Prize for exemplary translation, for his translations of Sholom Aleichem's Collected works.
- In 1952, he was awarded the Bialik Prize (literary award named after the poet Hayyim Nahman Bialik) for his Stories and plays (סיפורים ומחזות).
- In 1958, he was awarded the Israel Prize, for literature.
- In 1965, Berkowitz was awarded the Bialik Prize a second time, for his Childhood chapters (פירקי ילדות).

== See also ==
- Literature of Israel
- List of Israel Prize recipients
- List of Bialik Prize recipients
