= David Weiss Halivni =

Israeli-American rabbi (1927–2022)

- דָּוִד וַיְיס הַלִּבְנִי
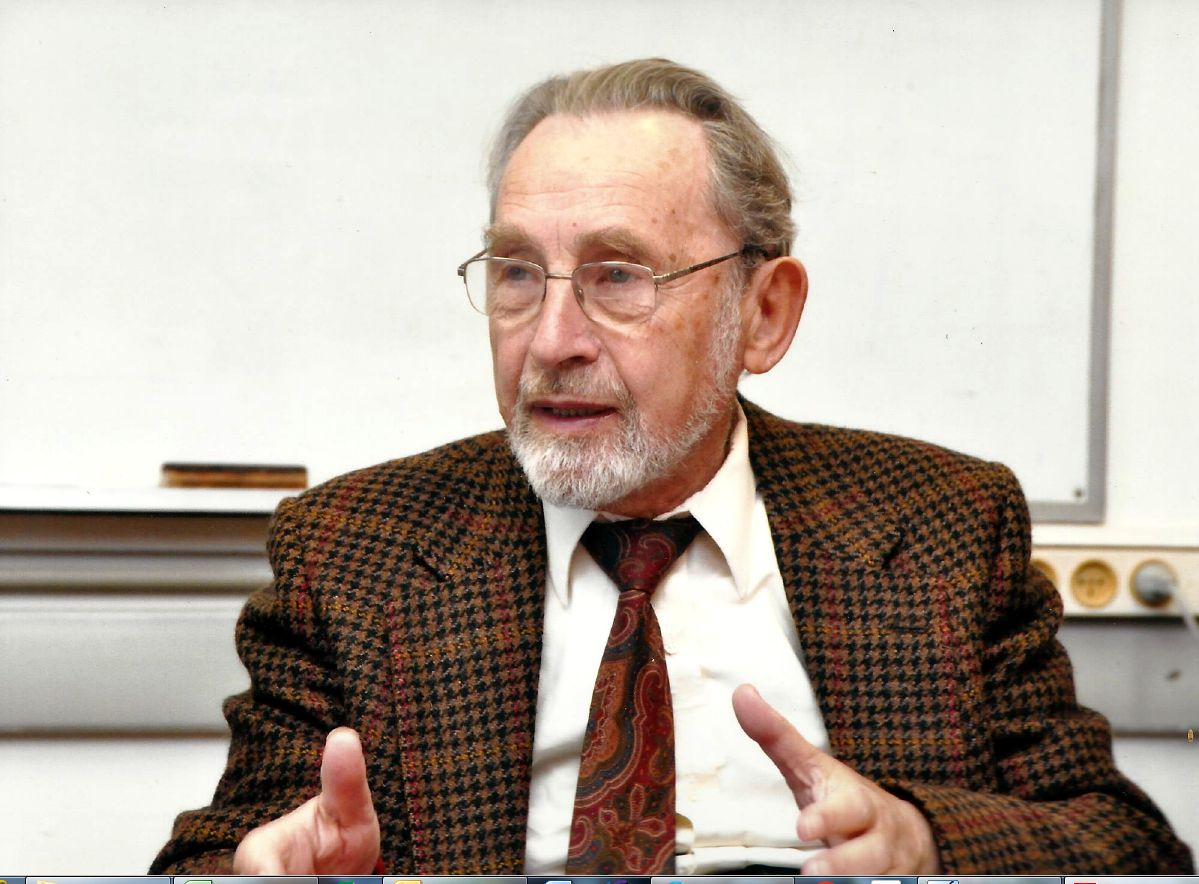
- Halivni in 2016
- Born: David Weiss; September 27, 1927; Kobyletska Poliana, Czechoslovakia
- Died: June 28, 2022 (aged 94); Jerusalem, Israel
- Education: Jewish Theological Seminary of America; Yeshiva Rabbi Chaim Berlin; Brooklyn College
- Occupations: Rabbi, scholar, talmudist
- Awards: Bialik Prize (1985); Israel Prize (2008); Guggenheim Fellowship

David Weiss Halivni (Hebrew: דָּוִד וַיְיס הַלִּבְנִי; September 27, 1927 – June 28, 2022) was a Czechoslovak-born American-Israeli rabbi, scholar in the domain of Jewish sciences, and professor of Talmud. He served as Reish Metivta of the Institute of Traditional Judaism, the Union for Traditional Judaism's rabbinical school.

== Biography ==
David Weiss was born on September 27, 1927, in Kobyletska Poliana (Кобилецька Поляна, Poiana Cobilei, Gyertyánliget) in Carpathian Ruthenia, then in Czechoslovakia (now in Rakhiv Raion, Ukraine). His parents separated when he was 4 years old, and he grew up in the home of his maternal grandfather, Rabbi Isaiah (Shaye) Weiss, a Hasidic Talmud scholar in Sighet, Romania.

His grandfather began teaching him at age 5, and he was regarded as a prodigy; he received semicha (rabbinic ordination) at age 15 from Rabbi Yekutiel Yehuda Gross of the town's yeshiva.

In March 1944, German troops arrived in Sighet to deport the town's Jewish population to concentration camps. Weiss, then 16 years old, was sent to Auschwitz along with his grandfather, mother, and sister; his father, Ephraim Bezalel Viderman, was murdered by the Nazis elsewhere. The remaining members of his family at Auschwitz were murdered, leaving Weiss as the sole survivor of his family at age 16. One week after he arrived at Auschwitz, Weiss transferred to the forced labor camps at Gross-Rosen, Wolfsberg, and then Mauthausen, where he worked in a munitions plant.

When he arrived in the United States at the age of 18 after his liberation, he was placed in a Jewish orphanage, where he created a stir by challenging the kashrut of the institution. A social worker introduced him to Rabbi Saul Lieberman, a leading Talmudist at the Jewish Theological Seminary of America (JTS) in New York, who recognized his brilliance and took him under his wing. Weiss later studied with Lieberman for many years at the JTS.

Initially, he studied in Yeshiva Chaim Berlin under Yitzchak Hutner and was allowed to forgo lectures because of his advanced standing. Over the next decade, he completed high school; earned a bachelor's degree in philosophy from Brooklyn College; a master's degree in philosophy from NYU, and his doctorate in Talmud at JTS.

He married Zipporah Hager, a descendant of the Vizhnitzer Rebbes, in 1953, and the couple settled in Manhattan. They had three children: Baruch (Bernard), Ephraim, and Yeshiahu. Halivni had six grandchildren: Avidan, Hadar, Daniel, Rebecca, Benjamin (Jamin), and Eliana.

Weiss, which is German for white, later changed his name to "Halivni," the Hebrew word for white. He died on June 18, 2022, at his home in Jerusalem at the age of 94.

== Academic career ==
For many years he served as a professor of Talmud at the Jewish Theological Seminary of America (JTS). He resigned in 1983. Halivni later served as Littauer Professor of Talmud and Classical Rabbinics in the Department of Religion at Columbia University. In July 2005, he retired from Columbia University and moved to Israel, where he taught at the Hebrew University of Jerusalem and Bar Ilan University until his death.

Halivni's "source-critical approach" to Talmud study had a major impact on academic understanding and study of the Talmud. The traditional understanding viewed the Talmud as a unified homogeneous work. While other scholars had also treated the Talmud as a multi-layered work, Halivni's innovation (primarily in the second volume of his Mekorot u-Mesorot) was to distinguish between the attributed, onymous statements, which are generally succinct rabbinic law (Halakhic) opinions or inquiries attributed to known Amoraim, and the anonymous statements within a given sugya (Talmudic passage). A sugya consists of a longer elaboration or analysis, often consisting of dialectic discussion that Halivni attributed to the later authors - "Stamma'im" (or Savora'im). It has been noted that indeed the Jerusalem Talmud is very similar to the Babylonian Talmud, minus Stammaitic activity, which is to be found only in the latter.

His methodology of source-critical analysis of the Talmud is controversial among most Orthodox Jews, but is accepted in the non-Orthodox Jewish community, and by some within Modern Orthodoxy. Halivni terms the anonymous texts of the Talmud as having been said by Stammaim (based on the phrase "stama d'talmuda" which refers to the anonymous material in the Gemara), who lived after the period of the Amoraim, but before the Geonic period. He posits that these Stammaim were the recipients of terse Tannaitic and Amoraic statements and that they endeavored to fill in the reasoning and argumentative background to such apodictic statements.

The methodology employed in his commentary Mekorot u' Mesorot (Hebrew: מקורות ומסורות) attempts to give Halivni's analysis of the correct import and context and demonstrates how the Talmudic Stammaim often erred in their understanding of the original context.

In Halivni's books Peshat and Derash and Revelation Restored, he attempts to harmonize biblical criticism with traditional religious belief using a concept he developed termed Chate'u Israel (literally, "Israel has sinned"). This concept states that the biblical texts originally given to Moses have become irretrievably corrupted. Revelation Restored writes as follows:

According to the biblical account itself, the people of Israel forsook the Torah, in the dramatic episode of the golden calf, only forty days after the revelation at Sinai. From that point on, until the time of Ezra, the scriptures reveal that the people of Israel were steeped in idolatry and negligent of the Mosaic law. Chate'u Yisrael states that in the period of neglect and syncretism after the conquest of Canaan when the originally monotheistic Israelites adopted pagan practices from their neighbours, the Torah of Moses became "blemished and maculated".

According to Halivni, this process continued until the time of Ezra (c.450 BCE), whereupon their return from Babylon the people accepted the Torah. It was at that time that the previously rejected, and therefore maculated, text of the Torah was recompiled and edited by Ezra and his "entourage." He claims that this is attested in the books of Ezra and Nehemiah, and Halivni supports his theory with Talmudic and Midrashic sources which indicate that Ezra played a role in editing the Torah. He further states that while the text of the Pentateuch was corrupted, oral tradition preserved intact many of the laws, which is why the Oral Law appears to contradict the Biblical text in certain details.

This view was seen as possibly being in contradiction to the 8th of Maimonides' 13 principles of faith, which states "the Torah that we have today is the one that was dictated to Moses by God". As a result, Halivni's assertions were rejected by some Orthodox rabbis.

== Views and opinions ==
Halivni was involved in the 1983 controversy at JTS surrounding the training and ordination of women as rabbis. He felt that there could be halakhic methods for ordaining women as rabbis but more time was needed before this could be legitimately instituted. He maintained that it was a policy decision by the governing body of the Seminary rather than a psak halachah based on the traditional rabbinic legal process.

== Published works ==
Halivni's published works include:

- Mekorot u'Mesorot (Hebrew: מקורות ומסורות). Commentary on the Talmud. Currently comprising 10 volumes: 1. Introductions, 2. Shabbat, 3. Eruvin and Pesahim, 4. Yoma-Hagigah, 5. Seder Nashim, 6. Bava Kamma, 7. Bava Mezia, 8. Bava Batra, 9. Sanhedrin, Makkot, Shevuot, Avodah Zarah, Horayot, 10. (posthumous) Zevahim, Menahot, Hullin.
- Midrash, Mishnah, and Gemara: The Jewish Predilection for Justified Law. Harvard University Press. 1986. ISBN 978-0674419315.
- Peshat and Derash: Plain and Applied Meaning in Rabbinic Exegesis. Oxford, England: Oxford University Press, 1991.
- Revelation Restored: Divine Writ and Critical Responses. Boulder, Colo: Westview Press, 1997.
- The Book and the Sword: A Life of Learning in the Shadow of Destruction. New York: Farrar, Straus and Giroux, 1996. (His memoirs)
- Breaking the Tablets: Jewish Theology After the Shoah. Lanham: Rowman & Littlefield Publishers, 2007. (A collection of essays on Holocaust theology.)
- The Formation of the Babylonian Talmud. Oxford University Press. 2013. ISBN 9780199739882.

The central thesis of Breaking the Tablets is that the history of the Jews is "bookmarked" by two diametrically opposing "revelations": Sinai and Auschwitz. The revelation on Mount Sinai was the apex of God's nearness to the Jews, while the revelation at Auschwitz was the nadir of God's absence from them. Halivni's conviction is that Auschwitz represents not merely God's "hiding his face" from Israel, as a consequence of the Jews' sins — a familiar trope in rabbinic theology —, but also his actual, ontological withdrawal from human history.

In Breaking the Tablets Halivni explicitly rejected the notion that this withdrawal is simply an example of hester panim, "God hiding his face", as viewed in normative Judaism. The concept of hester panim is classically used with regard to punishment, and Halivni is adamant that the Holocaust cannot in any way be regarded as a punishment for Israel's sins.

== Awards and recognition ==
- In 1985, Halivni was a co-recipient (jointly with Hillel Barzel and Shlomo Pines) of the Bialik Prize for Jewish thought.
- In 1997, he won awarded the National Jewish Book Award in Scholarship for Revelation Restored: Divine Writ and Critical Responses
- In 2008, he was awarded the Israel Prize for his Talmudic work.

== See also ==
- List of Bialik Prize recipients
- List of Israel Prize recipients
