= Jacob Steinberg =

Ukrainian-born Israeli poet

Jacob Steinberg (Hebrew: יעקב שטיינברג; September 1, 1887– June 22, 1947) was a major Ukrainian-born poet in Mandatory Palestine.

== Biography ==
Jacob Steinberg was born in Bila Tserkva, but ran off to Odessa when he was 14, joining Bialik and other Jewish intellectuals of the Hebrew literary circle there. In 1903 Steinberg moved to Warsaw, and participated in Peretz's literary circle. In 1910 he moved to Switzerland, studying in university at Bern and Lucerne. He soon returned to Warsaw. During those years, he published works in Hebrew and Yiddish, especially in the Yiddish newspaper "Der Fraind" (דער פֿרײַנד). While still in Europe, he married and divorced a dentist with whom he had one son.

In 1914, Steinberg immigrated to Palestine, and wrote exclusively in Hebrew ever since. In 1929, he married Liza Arlosoroff, a musician, and sister of Haim Arlosoroff, and later edited Haim Arlosoroff's writings.

He remained in Tel Aviv for the rest of his life, though he briefly lived in Berlin in the 1920s. He received the Bialik Prize in 1937.

== Literary style ==
He defied trends in two significant ways: his poetry was individualistic rather than nationalistic, and he wrote in the Ashkenazic dialect rather than the Sephardic dialect, which became the accepted norm of Israeli Hebrew. His two most famous poems are "Not an enclosed Garden" and "Confession".

His first publication was poems for children in the weekly Olam Katan (1901, 1903). Since 1903, he published poems in HaShiloah and other periodicals in Hebrew. In Warsaw he published two poetry collections: "Bidut" ("Solitude", 1906) and "Sefer ha-satirot" ("The Book of Satires", 1910). He also simultaneously published poems and short stories in Yiddish, which were collected in the book Gezamltte font ("Selected", Warsaw, 1909). After moving to Israel for ideological reasons, he stopped writing in Yiddish. His only poem in Hebrew is Masa Avshalom (The Journey of Absalom, 1914-1915), which was largely autobiographical.

Steinberg's early works clearly show the influence of Bialik and Russian Romanticism. In his later works, features of Russian and French symbolism can be traced. Yaakov Steinberg was originally a bilingual writer, but later abandoned Yiddish for ideological reasons and wrote only in Hebrew.

The constant motif of his stories is a tireless passion that is suppressed by strict prohibitions. The problems of marriage in traditional Jewish families are often raised, and female characters are quite significant. The most famous works of the artist's oeuvre are the stories "The Blind Woman" (1913) and "The Rabbi's Daughter" (1914).

=== "The Blind Woman" ===
A short story written in Yiddish in 1913 and first published in Hebrew in 1923. The story centers on the fate of a blind girl from a traditional Jewish family who marries an unknown man. The family tells the heroine a lie about her future husband, describing him as a young widower and a tobacco dealer. In fact, he turns out to be an elderly gravedigger, and a rude and cruel man. Soon after the birth of her child, the girl learns about a terrible epidemic raging in the neighborhood, and then realizes that her child is sick. The old gravedigger ignores the girl's pleas for help, and the child dies.

=== "The Rabbi's Daughter" ===
This is a short story written in 1914. The protagonist of the story is Sarah, the daughter of a rabbi, for whom the family chooses a suitable groom, Berl, the owner of a tobacco shop. The young man and the girl immediately develop intense feelings, and they have an affair long before the wedding, which results in pregnancy. Sara tries to persuade her parents to expedite the wedding, to no avail. She tries to get help from Berl who angrily disavows her. Then, she tells her childless peasant servant Ulyana about her disgrace. Ulyana invites Sara to come to her house on Saturday afternoon. There is a strong suggestion that she is offering to perform Sarah's abortion, which at the time would have been a terrifying and risky procedure. Sara asks Berl to accompany her through the Goy neighborhood to Ulyana's house, but he leaves town on a false pretext. Terrified and trapped, Sarah decides to commit suicide.

== See also ==
- Israeli literature

== Bibliography ==
- Elhanan, Elazar (2014). The Path Leading to the Abyss: Hebrew and Yiddish in the Poetry of Yaakov Steinberg 1903-1915 (Thesis). Columbia University Libraries. doi:10.7916/D80K26QJ.
