= Yeshurun Keshet =

Israeli poet

- ישֻרוּן קֶשֶת
- Born: Ya'akov Yehoshua Koplewitz; November 29, 1893; Mińsk Mazowiecki, Congress Poland
- Died: February 22, 1977 (aged 83); Jerusalem, Israel
- Resting place: Mount of Olives Jewish Cemetery
- Spouse: Clara Hollander
- Writing career
- Language: Hebrew
- Notable awards: Tchernichovsky Prize (1948); Bialik Prize (1976)

Yeshurun Keshet (Hebrew: ישֻרוּן קֶשֶת; 29 November 1893 – 22 February 1977), born Ya'akov Yehoshua Koplewitz, was an Israeli poet, essayist, translator and literary critic.

== Biography ==
Keshet was born in Mińsk Mazowiecki, Congress Poland, and sent by his parents to Tel Aviv in 1911 to attend the Herzliya Hebrew Gymnasium. Between 1920 and 1926 he studied at universities in Rome and Berlin, and also taught in Marijampole, Lithuania. He Hebraized his surname following the establishment of the State of Israel in 1948.

== Work ==
Keshet's volumes of poetry include Ha-Helekh ba-Aretz (1932), Elegyot (1944), and Ha-Ḥayyim ha-Genuzim (1959). Notable among his works of literary criticism is his monograph on Micha Josef Berdyczewski (1958).

Keshet translated into Hebrew numerous classics of philosophy and literature, among them works by Winston Churchill, Moses Hess, William James, Franz Kafka, Jack London, Thomas Mann, and Romain Rolland.

== Awards ==
- Tchernichovsky Prize for the translation of the essays of Michel de Montaigne (1948)
- Kugel Prize from the Municipality of Holon (1968)
- Bialik Prize (1976)
