= Yehoshua Kenaz =

Israeli novelist (1937–2020)

Yehoshua Kenaz (Hebrew: יהושע קנז; 2 March 1937 – 12 October 2020) was an Israeli novelist who studied at the Hebrew University and at the Sorbonne. Kenaz is best known for his novel Infiltration, published in 1986.

== Biography ==
Yehoshua Glass (later Kenaz) was born in Petah Tikva, in the British Mandate of Palestine, in 1937. During the Second World War, his father worked for the British Army, and for a while the family moved to Haifa. He learned to play the violin. His brother Hilik was born when he was thirteen. He was drafted to the Israel Defense Forces and was sent to a basic training camp for physically unfit soldiers. He then served in the Israeli Intelligence Corps. He changed his last name to Kenaz, after Othniel Ben Kenaz, a Biblical name with a similar sound.

He studied Philosophy and Romance languages at the Hebrew University, and French literature at the Sorbonne. He wrote his first story in Paris and sent it to Aharon Amir's Keshet journal under the name of Avi Otniel (literally "father of Othniel"). He became famous in Israel in 1986 when his novel Infiltration became a best seller.

Kenaz died on 12 October 2020, in Petah Tikva, after a COVID-19 infection. He was 83.

== Literary career ==
He translated many French classics into Hebrew, and worked on the editorial staff of the Ha'aretz newspaper. He was awarded the Alterman Prize in 1991, the Newman Prize in 1992, the Agnon Prize (1993), the ACUM Prize (1994) and the Bialik Prize (1995). In 2007, Infiltration was named one of the ten most important books in Israeli history. Four of his novels have been adapted to film: Ahare Hahagim, directed by Amnon Rubinstein, in 1994; Alila (from the novel Returning Lost Lives), directed by Amos Gitai, in 2003; On the Way to the Cats, directed by Jorge Gurvich in 2009; and, Infiltration, directed by Dover Koshashvili, released to critical acclaim at the Jerusalem Film Festival 2010.

Kenaz said he was not a Zionist because he did not believe a Jewish state would solve the problem of antisemitism. He supported a two-state solution to the Israeli–Palestinian conflict because he wanted the Hebrew language and culture to be hegemonic and more cultivated in Israel.

== Published works ==
After the Holidays (1964) is about the disintegration of a family in a small farming community in Palestine during the British Mandate. The Great Woman of the Dreams (1973) depicts the lives of the tenants of a rundown apartment house in Tel Aviv. Musical Moment (1980) is a collection of four stories dealing with themes of the rites of manhood and the disruption of innocence. Infiltration (1986) is the story of a platoon of young recruits with minor physical disabilities during their basic training at an Israeli army camp in the 1950s. The Way to the Cats (1991) tells the story of pensioners in an old-age home, who engage in a pathetic power struggle. Returning Lost Loves (1997) runs several plots in parallel form, sharing common characters. Landscape With Three Trees (2000) is two stories about the changes undergone by the Israeli society from the pre-state days to the present-day era.

The sociologist Dafna Hirsch uses Kenaz's 2008 short story, "The Black Briefcase", to illustrate the culture and performance of Zionist masculinity through the consumption of hummus.

=== In Hebrew ===
- After the Holidays (novel), Am Oved, 1964; 1987 [Aharei Ha-Hagim]
- The Great Woman of the Dreams (novel), Dvir, 1973 [Ha-Isha Ha-Gedolah Me-Ha-Halomot]
- Musical Moment (stories), Hakibbutz Hameuchad/Siman Kriah, *1980;1995 [Moment Musicali]
- Infiltration (novel), previously entitled Heart Murmur, Am Oved, 1986 [Hitganvut Yehidim]
- On the Way to the Cats (novel), Am Oved, 1991 [Ba-Derech La-Hatulim]
- Returning Lost Loves (novel), Am Oved, 1997 [Mahzir Ahavot Kodmot]
- Landscape with Three Trees (2 novellas), Am Oved, 2000 (Nof Im Shlosha Etzim)
- Between Night and Dawn (novella), Hakibbutz Hameuchad, 2006 [Bein Laila ve-Bein Shashar]

=== Translated into English ===
- Kenaz, Yehoshua (1987). After the Holidays. Harcourt. p. 216. ISBN 0-15-103959-3.
- Kenaz, Yehoshua (1998). The Way to the Cats: A Novel. Zoland Books. p. 325. ISBN 1-883642-48-5.
- Kenaz, Yehoshua (1998). Musical Moment: And Other Stories. Zoland Books. p. 176. ISBN 1-883642-47-7.
- Kenaz, Yehoshua (2001). Returning Lost Loves: A Novel. Zoland Books. p. 250. ISBN 1-58642-013-5.
- Kenaz, Yehoshua (2003). Infiltration: A Novel. Zoland Books. p. 608. ISBN 1-58195-205-8.
