= Chaim Tchernowitz =

Russian-American rabbi and scholar

Chaim Tchernowitz (1871-1949), also known by his pen name Rav Tzair, was a Russian-American rabbi, author, teacher, and publicist.

== Early life ==
He was born in the town of Sebezh, in western Russia. His brother, Samuel Tchernowitz, eventually became a notable journalist and Zionist activist.

In his youth Chaim Tchernowitz was a child prodigy, and studied with his grandfather, who was rabbi of the town. In addition to his religious studies, he enthusiastically studied leading secular works of the time, such as those by Darwin and Tolstoy.

== Career ==
In 1893 he married and moved to Kaunas, where he obtained rabbinical ordination from Yitzchak Elchanan Spektor in 1896. He became well known for a eulogy he gave on the occasion of Rabbi Spektor's death.

In 1897 he moved to Odessa, where he became the rabbi of the city. He had close relationships with many of the secular Jewish intellectuals who lived there at the time:

Deeply embedded in Odessa’s enlightened circles, Tchernowitz served as a minister to the faithful and the faithless—a traditionalist among iconoclasts, a rabbi of atheists and skeptics. In this capacity, he forged relationships with such intellectual and cultural luminaries as Mendele Mokher Seforim... Ahad Ha'am... and Simon Dubnow

In Odessa he founded his own yeshiva; in 1907, it became a rabbinical seminary. This institution attracted figures including Hayyim Nahman Bialik, Joseph Klausner, and Yehezkel Kaufmann.

In 1911, he departed Odessa for Germany. In 1914, he received a doctorate from the University of Wuerzburg; his thesis was entitled "On the Development of the Shulḥan ‘arukh". In 1923, he moved to the United States to begin a professorship in Talmud at the Jewish Institute of Religion.

In 1928, he initiated a project known as the "Talmudic Library" with the intention of publishing an encyclopedia of the Talmud. The goal was to "establish the Talmud as a scientific discipline" and to refute antisemitic libels associated with the Talmud. Unfortunately, the project eventually failed due to funding difficulties.

He had close relations with Albert Einstein. The two met in 1930 and remained friends until Tchernowitz's death in 1949. Einstein wrote multiple letters in support of the "Talmudic Library" and Tchernowitz's other literary projects.

In 1939 or 1940, he founded and served as editor of the Hebrew-language journal Bitzaron, which published articles by leading figures on Jewish religious, cultural, and political topics.

== Writings ==
He was one of the first scholars to combine a wide halachic knowledge with modern academic methods of research. His scholarly writings focus on the development of the Oral Torah and halacha. Compared to his predecessors in this field (Isaac Hirsch Weiss and Yitzhak Isaac Halevy Rabinowitz), Tchernowitz put more emphasis on the period preceding the late Second Temple period, as well as on sociological and ideological factors. He also wrote numerous works on specific topics in Talmud and halacha. His scholarly writings include:

- Toledot haHalachah (4 volumes, 1935-1950 - describes the history of halacha up to the Talmudic period
- Toledot HaPoskim (3 volumes, 1946-7) - describes the history of halacha from the Mishnah to the Shulchan Aruch
- Kitzur HaTalmud: a series of academically-oriented commentaries on various Talmudic tractates
- Lessons in marriage laws according to the Talmud (1922)
- Decision in the dispute of one and many (1911)
- Tikkun Shabbat (1900), regarding the eruv in Odessa

The contemporary scholar Micha Josef Berdyczewski praised his work as follows:

When we compare Rav Tzair's work to [that of Michael Levi Rodkinson], we see the giant step forward in Rav Tzair's work. His summaries are comprehensive teachings, and his clear commentary is truly a straight and novel path. If only he had devoted his life to this work alone, which perhaps only he is capable of.

His writings also include two collections of political essays:

- In the gates of Zion: a collection of articles regarding the land of Israel and Zionism (1937), including many polemic articles
- Birthpangs of redemption: a collection of articles on the struggle for rebirth of the state of Israel (1949)

His more personal writings include:

- Chapters of life: an autobiography (1954)
- Tractate of memories: characters and evaluations (1945), describing the rabbis and famous personalities who he had encountered in his life.
