= Hillel Barzel =

- הלל ברזל
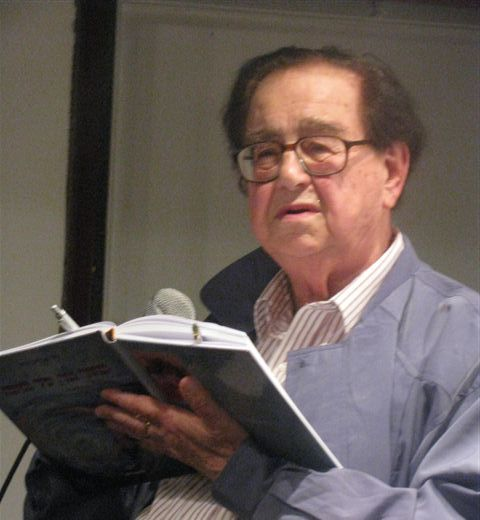
- Born: 9 May 1925; Safed, Israel
- Died: 9 February 2022 (aged 96)
- Scientific career
- Institutions: Hebrew University of Jerusalem, Tel Aviv University, Bar-Ilan University

Hillel Barzel (9 May 1925 – 9 February 2022) was an Israeli literary scholar and professor of Judaism and comparative literature at Bar-Ilan University.

== Biography ==
Barzel was born in Safed in 1925. He attended the Mizrahi Bilu municipal school in Tel Aviv. He later studied at Columbia University and the Hebrew University of Jerusalem, earning a master's degree.

In 1951, he served as head of the Hebrew Scouts Movement in Tel Aviv. From 1952 to 1959, he worked as director of the Youth Bureau in the Education Department of the Tel Aviv-Yafo Municipality. In early 1960, he was promoted to deputy director of the Education and Sports Department.

At the end of 1963, he received a doctorate from Bar-Ilan University for his thesis titled "The Anti-Biblical Foundation of Our Modern Poetry" (היסוד האנטי-תנ"כי בשירתנו החדשה) supervised by Prof. Baruch Kurzweil. This was the first doctorate ever awarded by Bar-Ilan University, and its conferral angered the Council for Higher Education in Israel. The matter was later resolved, and Barzel retained his title. In 1969, he was appointed director of the People's University in Tel Aviv.

In 1971, Barzel was promoted to the rank of associate professor at Bar-Ilan University. Hillel Barzel later served as a professor of Hebrew literature, comparative literature, and literature and the Bible at Indiana University. He also taught at Tel Aviv University, the University of Haifa, and the Technion.

== Awards ==
From 1970 to 1971, Barzel was a member of the Bialik Prize judging committee. In 1985, he received the Bialik Prize for Jewish Thought. In 1998, he was awarded the title Yakir Tel Aviv, title of honor awarded annually by the Tel Aviv-Yafo Municipality. In 2014, Barzel was awarded with the Ramat Gan Prize for Literature.

== Works ==
- Barzel, Hillel (ed.) Nathan Alterman: "The Happiness of the Poor"; Biblical and Shakespearean Allusions [in Hebrew]; 40 pp. Tel Aviv; Eked (in press).
- Barzel, Hillel (ed.) Modern Hebrew Poetry; Vol 4. Poetry of Renaissance: Masters of Genre [in Hebrew]; 765 pp. Tel Aviv; Sifriat Poalim; 1997.
- Barzel, Hillel (ed.) Drama of Extreme Situations: War and Holocaust [in Hebrew]; 383 pp. Tel Aviv; Sifriat Poalim; 1995.
- Weiss, Hillel; Barzel, Hillel (eds.) Studies in the Works of S.Y. Agnon (in Honor of Professor Yehuda Friedlander) [in Hebrew]; 420 pp. Ramat Gan; Bar-Ilan University Press; 1994.
- Barzel, H. "S.Y. Agnon - Open and Discrete." In: Barzel, H. and Weiss, H. (eds.) Studies of Agnon [in Hebrew]; p. 131-167. Ramat Gan; Bar-Ilan University Press; 1994.
- Barzel, Hillel (ed.) Poetry and Ideology [in Hebrew]; 302 pp. Tel Aviv; Hebrew Writers Association; 1993.
- Barzel, Hillel (ed.) Modern Hebrew Poetry; Vol. 3 [in Hebrew]; 544 pp.; Sifriat Poalim; 1992.
- Barzel, Hillel (ed.) New Interpretations of Literary Texts: From Theory to Method; 348 pp.; 1990.
- Barzel, H. "The Concealed Meaning of Bialik, Hayim Nahman 'He Glimpsed and Died'" Modern Language Studies; vol. 19; 1989; p. 26-49.
- Barzel, Hillel, Kafka's Jewish Identity: A Cntemplative World-view.

== Personal life ==
Barzel was married to Yedioth Ahronoth journalist Bina Barzel. Died on 9 February 2022.
