= Yehoshua Tan Pai =

Hebrew poet, journalist, lexicographer, children's books author

- יהושע טן-פי
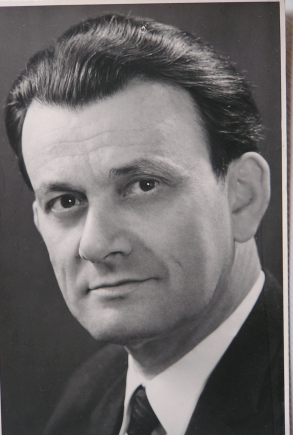
- Born: Shia Budeshtsky; 2 July 1914; Kishinev, Bessarabia Governorate, Russian Empire
- Died: 13 Mar 1988 (aged 73); Jerusalem
- Occupations: Poet, author, journalist, editor
- Writing career
- Period: 20th century
- Notable awards: Bialik Prize, Levi Eshkol Prize

Yehoshua Tan Pai (Hebrew: יהושע טן פאי; 2 July 1914 – 13 March 1988), was born in Kishinev, Bessarabia, present-day Moldova. He was a Hebrew poet, journalist, dictionarist as well as an author and editor of children's stories.

== Biography ==
Yehoshua Ten-Pi was born Shia Budeshtsky (Ши́е Буде́штский) in Chisinau, to Saul-Yehezkel and Manya (née Brill) Budeshtsky, a religious family. He studied at the Magen David Hebrew Gymnasium founded by Rabbi Yehuda Leib Tsirelson. He immigrated to Eretz Israel in 1934 and joined Kibbutz Hashomer Hatzair in Magdiel. He initially worked in Mandatory Palestine as an orchardist, farmer and construction worker and continued to work in the vicinity of Magdiel. It was during this period that he wrote his first book of poems, published in 1937. Later he moved to Tel Aviv and participated regularly in Davar's literary supplement. From 1937 to 1938 he stayed in Paris to complete his studies, where he fell in love with the French language, and later became best known as the author of the famous dictionary, the Tan-Pai Dictionary of French.

Upon his aliyah to Eretz Israel, he changed his name to Paytan, because he saw himself as a poet from an early age. He later changed the name Payten to Ten-Pi – anagram, the same name in the reversal of syllables. He worked as a teacher at the Kfar Vitkin school and later in Kfar Yehoshua. In 1942 he joined the editorial board of Haaretz newspaper in Tel Aviv and left it three years later. He then founded the small publishing house "The Library of Hours", in which he published mainly children's books, originals and translations. Among his publishing projects are the weekly "Echo of Jerusalem" and the children's animated weekly "Mickey Maoz" for which he did not ask a licence to publish. In his Mickey Mouse weeklies, he'd combined Mickey Mouse with stories on Israeli children and their adventures.

In 1948 he returned to the "Haaretz" system, and in 1951 he was transferred to Jerusalem, to serve as the editor of the newspaper in the city. He was a member of the Literary Council of the Writers' Association and vice-chairman of the Journalists' Association in Jerusalem. Yehoshua Ten-Pai did not join any literary group. He was greatly influenced by contemporary French poetry. Among the subjects he wrote about in his youth – the uniqueness of the young poet and his breakthrough into the world. "Poem to Yehoshua Ten-Pai" is a well-known poem of his, in which he formulated his devotion to the world of poetry. Apart from his poems, he also translated poetry from several languages, including Yiddish, Romanian, German, French and English.

In 1958, his daughter Noa, who was 12 years old at the time, died (named after her "Beit Noa" in Emek Matzalaba in Jerusalem). Then another disaster befell the poet, when his son Shaul Tan-Pai fell during the war of attrition in the Suez Canal. The nature of his poetry changed following this, touching and completely different from anything he had written up to that point. He devoted his last years to the memory of his children.

In 1986, he raised a torch at the torch lighting ceremony on Independence Day. His personal archive is preserved in the archives of the Writers' Association in Beit Ariela in Tel Aviv.
