= Mordechai Altshuler =

Israeli Historian

- מרדכי אלטשולר
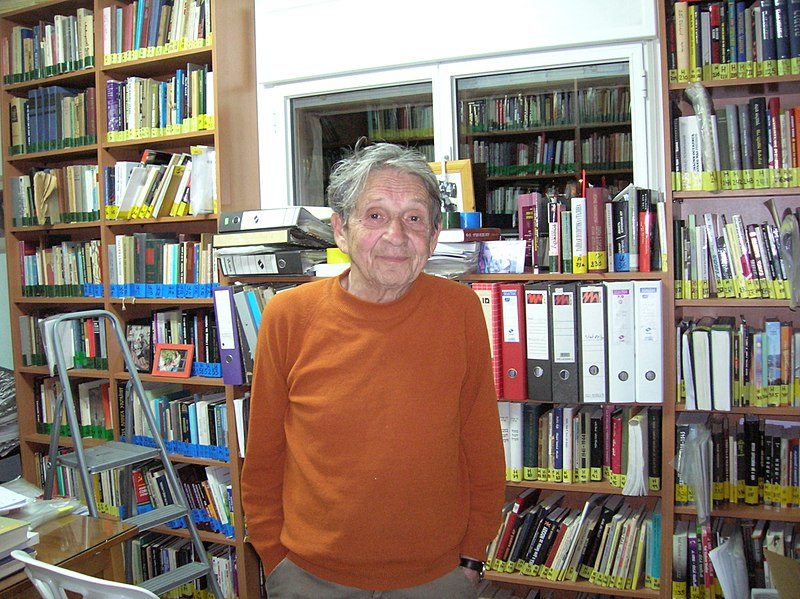
- Mordechai Altshuler, 2009
- Born: October 25, 1932; Suwałki, Poland
- Died: June 18, 2019 (aged 86); Jerusalem, Israel
- Education: Hebrew University of Jerusalem
- Occupation: Historian
- Known for: History, demography and culture of Soviet Jews
- Awards: Bialik Prize (1991)

Mordechai Altshuler (Hebrew: מרדכי אלטשולר; October 25, 1932, Suwałki, Poland – July 18, 2019, Jerusalem, Israel) was an Israeli historian and professor at the Hebrew University of Jerusalem. He specialized in the study of the demography, history and culture of Soviet Jews.

== Early life and education ==
Mordechai Altshuler was born in interwar Poland in the city of Suwałki on October 25, 1932, to a traditional middle-class Jewish family. His grandfather Eliezer Mordechai Altshuler (1844–1921) was an activist in the proto-Zionist movement Hovevei Zion, who visited Ottoman Palestine to explore the possibility of acquiring land for Jewish settlements.

== Career ==
After the outbreak of World War II and the partition of Poland between Germany and the USSR, the Altshuler family fled to Soviet territory and, after refusing to accept Soviet citizenship, were deported to the Vologda region. After the liberation of the deportees in accordance with the Soviet-Polish agreement on July 30, 1941, the family moved several times from place to place, they were in the Ural and Central Asia, so Mordechai studied in fits and starts.

After the end of the war in 1946, Mordechai returned to Poland with his family and settled in Wrocław, where he attended a Jewish school and participated in the Zionist youth movement Dror.

In 1950, he repatriated to Israel as part of the youth aliyah and became a member of Kibbutz Na'an. From 1951 to 1953 he served in the Israeli army.

In 1956, he entered the Hebrew University of Jerusalem. He specialized in Hebrew literature and general history. He received a bachelor's degree in general history and Jewish literature in 1962 and a master's degree in Jewish history in 1964. In 1986 he was promoted to professor.

In 1972, he defended his doctoral dissertation on "Yevsektsiya in the Soviet Union" and began teaching at the Hebrew University.

Altshuler subsequently successfully developed the topic of the history and culture of Soviet Jews. He wrote a number of works on demography, Jewish identity, evacuation during the war, the specifics of the Holocaust in the USSR, etc. He was the editor of a number of books, and also the compiler and editor of bibliographical and documentary collections. Altshuler was an admirer of Yiddish culture, but also paid attention in his research to non-Ashkenazi groups of Jews.

From 1982 to 1985, Altshuler was director of the Institute of Contemporary Jewry.

From 1988 to 2001, he headed the Center for the Study and Documentation of East European Jewry at the Hebrew University.

Since 1987 - Editor of the journal Yahadut Zmanenu (Hebrew: יהדות זמננו). He devoted much attention to supporting young researchers, for which he took part in the creation and editing of the journal Jews in Eastern Europe, later Jews in Russia and Eastern Europe, published at the Hebrew University. He conducted research at Harvard, Columbia and Oxford universities, and worked extensively in the archives of the former USSR. Since 1992, he has led a training program for teachers of higher educational institutions of the CIS on the history of Eastern European Jewry at the International Center for University Teaching of Jewish Civilization (Jerusalem).

In 1991–1992, he was awarded the Bialik Prize and the Yad Ben Zvi Institute Prize for his book Jews of the Eastern Caucasus. History of Mountain Jews from the Beginning of the 19th Century", published in 1990.

In 2002, Altshuler retired from the Hebrew University, but continued to work as an emeritus professor.

He died on July 18, 2019, in Jerusalem.

== Published works ==
- Jews in the 1959 Soviet Union Census (Jerusalem, 1963, (in English) and (in Hebrew))
- The Beginning of the Yevsektsiya (Jerusalem, 1966, (in Hebrew))
- Between Nationalism and Communism: The Yevsektsiya in the Soviet Union, 1918–1930 (Tel Aviv, 1980, (in Hebrew))
- Soviet Jewry since the Second World War (1987, previously published in (in Hebrew))
- Jews of the Eastern Caucasus. History of Mountain Jews from the Beginning of the 19th Century (Jerusalem, 1990, (in Hebrew))
- Jews in the 1939 Soviet Union Census (Jerusalem, 1993, (in English))
- Soviet Jewry on the Eve of the Holocaust (Brooklyn, NY: Berghahn Books, 1998.)
- Religion and Jewish identity in the Soviet Union, 1941–1964 (Иерусалим, 2007, Waltham, MA: Brandeis University Press, 2012. (in English) and (in Hebrew))
- Surviving the Holocaust in the Soviet Union: changes in the life of Soviet Jewry, 1939–1963. (Jerusalem, 2019, (in Hebrew))

== Literature ==
- Arkady Zeltser In Memory of Mordechai Altshuler (25.X.1931–18.VII.2019) // Judaic-Slavic Journal. — Institute for Slavic Studies of the Russian Academy of Sciences, No. 2 (4). pp. 13–16. 2020. ISSN 2658-3364. doc:10.31168/2658-3364.2020.2.03.
- Mark Toltz. Mordechai Altshuler (1932 - 2019) and his demographic legacy // Демоскоп Weekly. August (No. 821-822). 2019. ISSN 1726-2887.
- Redlich Shimon. Obituary: Mordechai Altshuler // Holocaust and Genocide Studies. Vol. 34, no. 1. pp. 178–179. 2020. ISSN 8756-6583. doc:10.1093/hgs/dcaa016
