= Gershon Shofman =

Israeli writer and painter

- גרשון שופמן
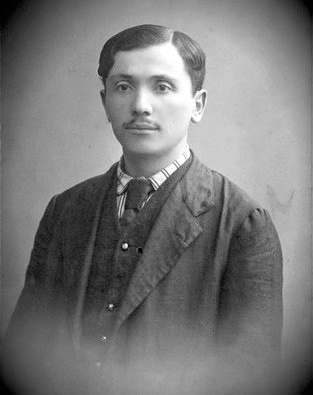
- Born: 1 January 1880; Orsha, Mogilev Governorate, Russian Empire
- Died: 1 January 1972 (aged 92); Israel
- Occupation: Writer
- Awards: Bialik Prize (1946); Israel Prize (1956)

Gershon Shofman (Hebrew: גרשון שופמן; born 1880; died 1972) was an Israeli writer.

== Biography ==
Gershon Shofman was born in Orsha, in the Mogilev Governorate of the Russian Empire (present-day Belarus) in 1880. His parents were Zalman Shoffman and Feiga Haya Levin. He grew up in a religious and traditional Jewish family.

At the age of 20, he moved to Warsaw, one of the centers of Hebrew literature, where he made a name for himself as a Hebrew writer.

He performed his military service in the Russian army from 1902 in Gomel, where he was in 1903 eyewitness of a pogrom. In 1904, after he had deserted from the Russian army at the beginning of the Russo-Japanese War, he fled to Lemberg, today Lviv, in Austria-Hungary. From 1913 he lived in Vienna.

In 1921, he married Anna Plank and lived with her in Wetzelsdorf, then an independent municipality, today a district in the west part of the city of Graz. In 1928, Anna and his children Peter and Gertrude converted from the Catholic faith to Judaism. During his 34-year stay in Austria, he was stateless throughout.

In 1938, he immigrated to Palestine with his wife and children. He died in Israel in 1972, where his literary talents were lauded.

== Literary career ==
Shoffmann was considered a master of the short story. He wrote and edited in Hebrew. In 1900-1903, he was a co-editor of the Hebrew newspaper Snunit, published in Lvov. He also wrote some 50 short stories in Lvov, many of which are set in the city.

== Awards and recognition ==
- In 1946, Shoffman was awarded the Bialik Prize for Literature.
- In 1956, he was awarded the Israel Prize, for literature.
- Streets in BeerSheba and Haifa are named after him

== See also ==
- List of Israel Prize recipients
- List of Bialik Prize recipients
- Hebrew literature
