= Shoham Smith =

Israeli writer (born 1966)

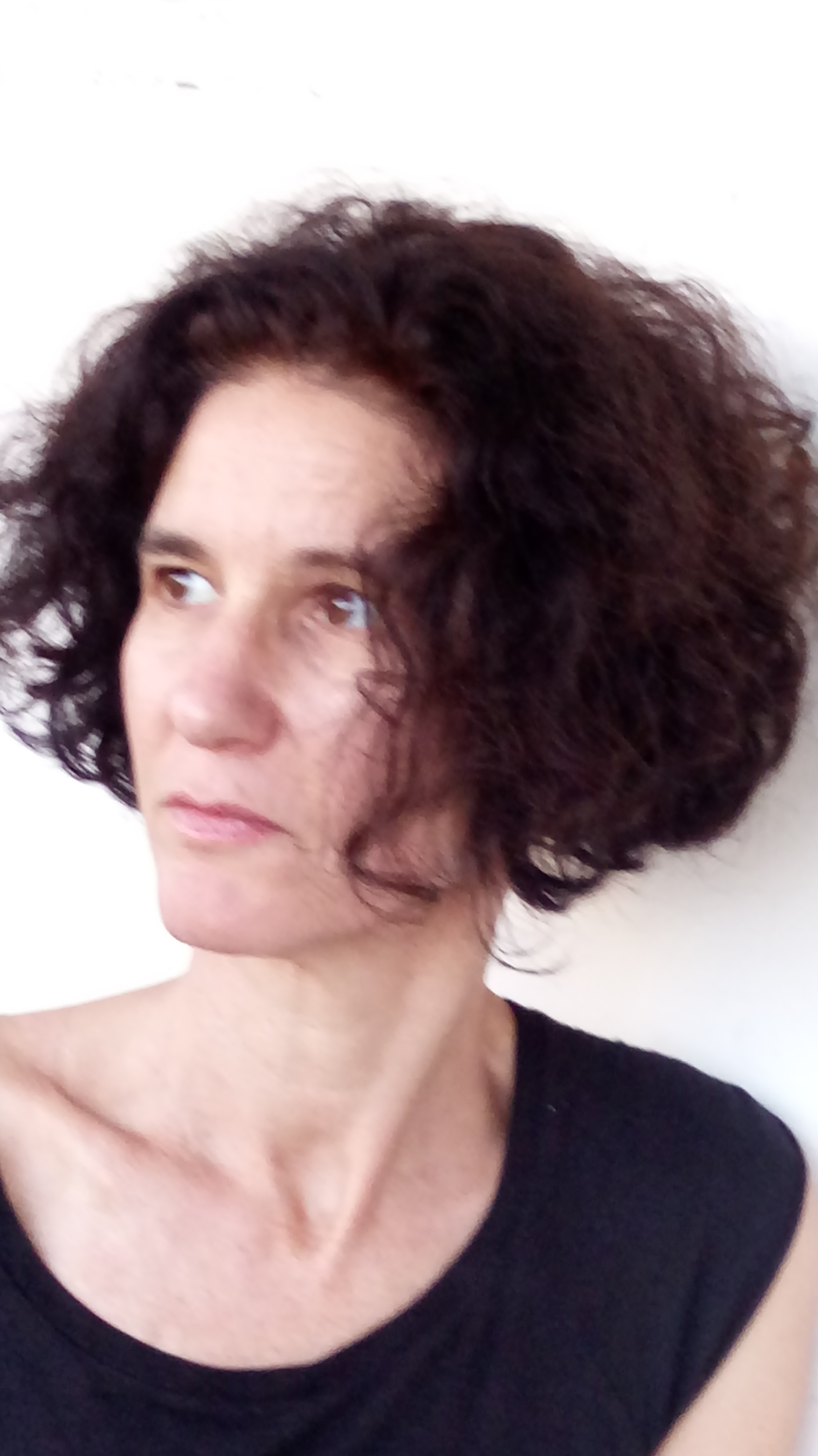
Shoham Smith, 2017

Shoham Smith (Hebrew: שהם סמיט; born 1966) is an Israeli writer and translator, best known as a children's books writer.

Sholam Smith studied industrial design at the Bezalel Academy of Art and Design and literature at Tel Aviv University.

== Books ==
=== Children's books ===
- 2019: Who Invented School Anyway?
- 2018: (with Eitan Eloa) The brides’ dressess
- 2017: Sand Dunes Child: Six Stories in the Footsteps of S. Yizhar
- 2016: My Aunt Lea Goldberg
- 2016: The Legend of Kamtza and Bar-Kamtza
- 2016: Avera: The Journey to Painting
- 2015: Yakinton: A Story about Friendship and Song
- 2015: The Legend of Astrid
- 2014: An After Bedtime Story (translated in English and French)
- 2013: Signs in the Well
- 2012: City Boy
- 2011: A Treasury of Hebrew Legends for Children
- 2010: Porridge for Daddy (translated in French and German)
- 2008: A Day in Jerusalem
- 2004: (with Rutu Modan) Who Drank My Juice?
- 1996: Things that My Heart Fails to Tell

== Adult books ==
- 1996: לבי אומר כי זיכרוני בוגד בי My Heart Says That My Memory Betrays Me
- 2002: טייק אווי: קומדיה שחורה בחדר הלידה Takeaway: A Black Comedy in the Delivery Room

== Awards ==
- 2009: Prime Minister's Prize for Hebrew Literary Works
- 2011, 2015: ACUM award
- 2014: Devorah Omer Prize for A Treasury of Hebrew Legends for Children
- 2017, 2021: Lea Goldberg Prize for My Aunt Lea Goldberg
- 2018: Bialik Prize

== Personal ==
In the mid-1990s, she married translator Amnon Katz, and they have three children. They divorced after 26 years of marriage.
