= Shlomo Pines =

Israeli scholar of Jewish and Islamic philosophy (1908–1990)

- שלמה פינס
- Born: 5 August 1908; Charenton-le-Pont, France
- Died: 9 January 1990 (aged 81); Jerusalem, Israel
- Education: Studied philosophy, Semitic languages, and linguistics at the universities of Heidelberg, Geneva, and Berlin
- Occupations: Scholar, professor
- Employer: Hebrew University of Jerusalem
- Notable work: English translation of Maimonides' Guide of the Perplexed
- Awards: Israel Prize (1968); Bialik Prize (1985)

Shlomo Pines (/ˈpiːnɪs/; Hebrew: שלמה פינס; 5 August 1908 – 9 January 1990) was an Israeli scholar of Jewish and Islamic philosophy, best known for his English translation of Maimonides' Guide of the Perplexed.

== Biography ==
Pines was born in Charenton-le-Pont near Paris, and grew up in Paris, Riga, Arkhangelsk, London and Berlin. His father, Meir Pines, was a scholar and businessman whose Sorbonne dissertation comprised the first attempt at a history of Yiddish literature.

Between 1926 and 1934 Shlomo Pines studied philosophy, Semitic languages, and linguistics at the universities of Heidelberg, Geneva and Berlin. Among his friends at Berlin were Paul Kraus and Leo Strauss, the latter of whom would contribute the lengthy introductory essay to Pines' classic translation of The Guide. From 1937 to 1939 he taught the history of science in Islamic countries at the Institute of the History of Science in Paris. In 1940, he and his family departed for Palestine on the last boat leaving Marseille before the Nazi occupation of France (during which time 25% of French Jews were deported and murdered).

In the young State of Israel, Pines was a professor in the Department of Jewish Thought and the Department of Philosophy at the Hebrew University of Jerusalem from 1952 until his death in 1990.

In 1971 Pines discovered a 10th-century Arabic version of the Testimonium Flavianum by Josephus due to Agapius of Hierapolis. Pines also discovered a 12th-century Syriac version of Josephus by Michael the Syrian. Leading scholar Louis Feldman stated that the discovery of Pines "created a considerable stir" in the academic community by drawing attention to two important historical works which had been almost completely neglected before then.

Pines' fluency in a wide variety of modern and ancient languages, including Arabic, Syriac, Hebrew, Persian, Sanskrit, Turkish, and Coptic, enabled him to undertake scholarship of uniquely broad scope.

== Awards ==
- In 1968, Pines was awarded the Israel Prize, in the humanities.
- In 1985, he was a co-recipient (jointly with Hillel Barzel and David Weiss Halivni) of the Bialik Prize for Jewish thought.

== Major publications ==
Most of Pines' articles and essays have been made freely available to the public by the Shlomo Pines Society.

Pines' most recognized books include:

- Contributions to the Islamic Theory of Atoms (1936)
- The Development of the Notion of Freedom (1984)
- The Guide of the Perplexed I, II (1963)
- Between the Thought of Israel and the Thought of the Nations
- The Jewish Christians of the Early Centuries of Christianity According to a New Source (1966)
- Summary of Arabic Philosophy, in the Cambridge History of Islam (1970)

== See also ==
- List of Israel Prize recipients
- List of Bialik Prize recipients
