= Baruch Kurzweil =

Israeli literary critic (1907–1972)

- ברוך קורצווייל
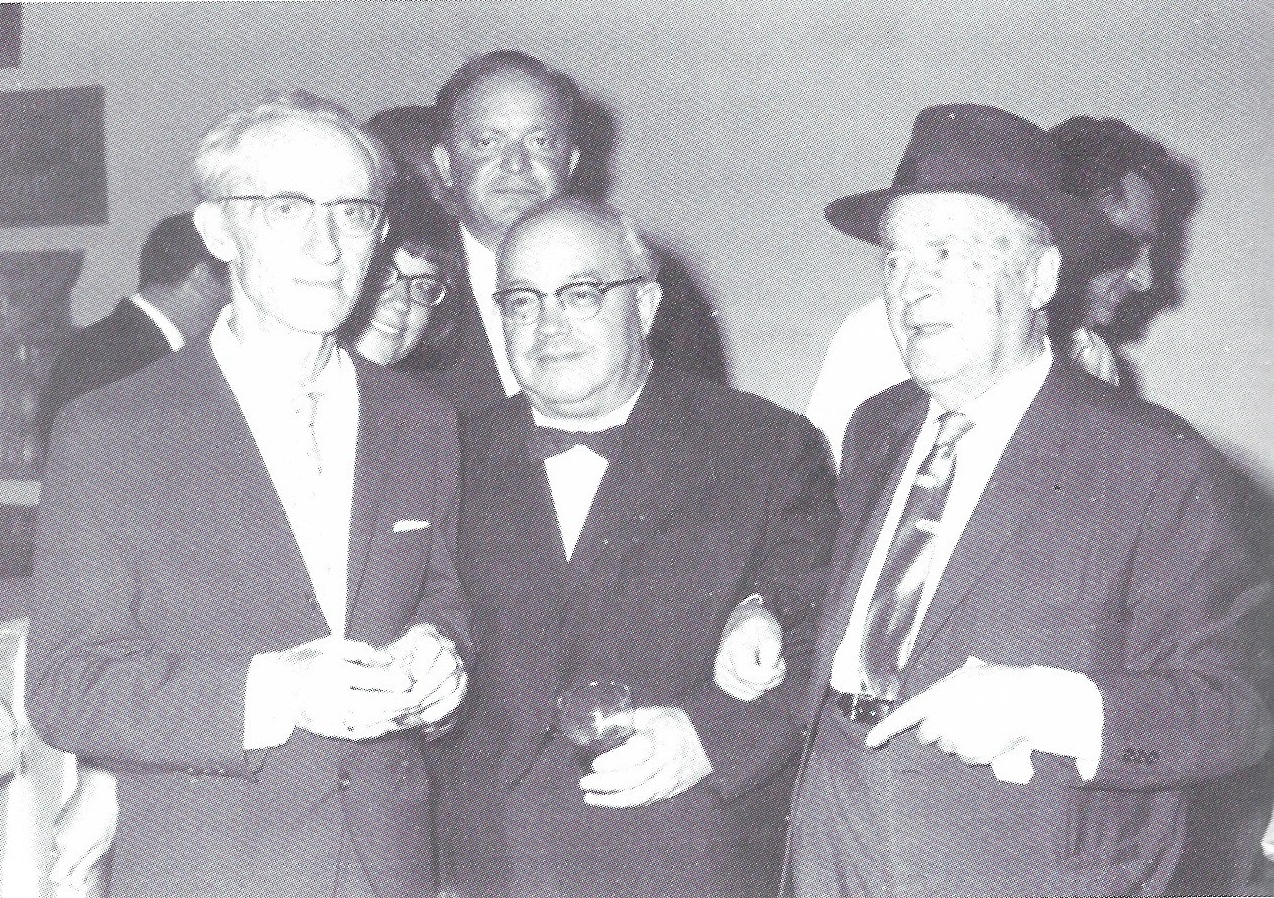
- Baruch Kurzweil (center) with Uri Zvi Greenberg and Shai Agnon in 1967
- Born: 1907; Brtnice, Moravia, Austria-Hungary
- Died: 1972 (aged 64–65); Ramat Gan, Israel
- Occupation: Literary critic

Baruch Kurzweil (Hebrew: ברוך קורצווייל; 1907–1972) was a pioneer of Israeli literary criticism.

== Biography ==
Kurzweil was born in Brtnice, Moravia (now Czech Republic) in 1907, to an Orthodox Jewish family. He studied at Solomon Breuer's yeshiva in Frankfurt and the University of Frankfurt. Kurzweil emigrated to Mandate Palestine in 1939. Kurzweil taught at a high school in Haifa, where he mentored the poet Dahlia Ravikovitch and psychologist Amos Tversky. He founded and headed Bar Ilan University's Department of Hebrew Literature until his death. He wrote a column for Haaretz newspaper.

Kurzweil committed suicide in 1972.

== Thought ==
Kurzweil saw secular modernity (including secular Zionism) as representing a tragic, fundamental break from the premodern world. Where before the belief in God provided a fundamental absolute of human existence, in the modern world this pillar of human life has disappeared, leaving a "void" that moderns futilely attempt to fill by exalting the individual ego. According to Kurzweil, this discontinuity is reflected in modern Hebrew literature, which lacks the religious foundation of traditional Jewish literature: “The secularism of modern Hebrew literature is a given in that it is for the most part the outgrowth of a spiritual world divested of the primordial certainty in a sacral foundation that envelops all the events of life and measures their value.”

Kurzweil saw a writer's response to the "void" of modern existence as their most fundamental characteristic. He believed S.Y. Agnon and Uri Zvi Grinberg were the greatest modern Hebrew writers. A confrontational polemicist, Kurzweil famously wrote against Ahad Haam and Gershom Scholem, who he saw as attempting to establish secularism as the foundation of Jewish life.

== Awards ==
- In 1962, Kurzweil was awarded the Bialik Prize for literature.

== See also ==
- Hebrew literature
- List of Bialik Prize recipients
