= Ephraim Urbach =

Israeli scholar of Judaism

- אפרים אורבך
- Born: 1912; Włocławek, Poland
- Died: July 3, 1991 (aged 78–79); Jerusalem, Israel
- Occupations: Scholar of Judaism; Professor of Talmud
- Known for: The Sages; Research on the Tosafot
- Awards: Israel Prize (1955); Bialik Prize (1983)

Academic work
- Discipline: Jewish studies
- Sub-discipline: Rabbinic thought
- Institutions: Hebrew University of Jerusalem
- Notable works: The Sages

Ephraim Elimelech Urbach (Hebrew: אפרים אלימלך אורבך; born 1912 – 3 July 1991) was a distinguished scholar of Judaism. He is best known for his landmark works on rabbinic thought, The Sages, and for research on the Tosafot. He was a candidate to presidency in Israel in 1973 but wasn't elected.

A professor of Talmud at the Hebrew University of Jerusalem, Urbach was a member and president of the Israel Academy of Sciences and Humanities.

== Biography ==
Ephraim Elimelech Urbach was born in Włocławek, Poland, to a hasidic family. He studied in Rome and Breslau, where he received rabbinic ordination in 1934. He immigrated to Mandatory Palestine in 1938. During World War II he served for four years as a chaplain in the British army. Subsequently he served as director of Ma'aleh secondary school in Jerusalem, before joining the Hebrew University faculty in 1953.

Urbach died on 3 July 1991 at Hadassah Hospital in Jerusalem after a long illness. He is buried at the Mount of Olives in Jerusalem, near Menachem Begin.

== Published works ==
- The Sages
- דרשות חז"ל על נביאי אומות העולם ועל פרשת בלעם "Rabbinic Exegesis About Gentile Prophets And The Balaam Passage" (Hebrew), Tarbitz (25:1956), Urbach explored the interpretation of the rabbis about Gittin 57a where Onkelos raises up Balaam from hell, and concluded that Balaam was not a reference to Jesus in the Talmud.

== Awards and recognition ==
- In 1955, Urbach was awarded the Israel Prize, for Jewish studies.
- In 1983, he was a co-recipient (jointly with Nechama Leibowitz) of the Bialik Prize for Jewish thought.

== See also ==
- List of Bialik Prize recipients
- List of Israel Prize recipients
