= Haycraft =

Haycraft is an English surname. Notable people with the surname include:

- Eliza Haycraft (1820–1871), American brothel madam and philanthropist
- James Haycraft (1865–1942), English cricketer
- John Berry Haycraft (1859–1922), English physiologist
- John Haycraft (1926–1996), English educator and writer
- Julius E. Haycraft (1871–1951), American lawyer, judge, and politician
- Ken Haycraft (1907–1995), American football player
- Molly Costain Haycraft (1911–2005), Canadian writer
- Thomas Haycraft (1859–1936), British barrister

== See also ==
- Haycraft Commission
