= Leon Simon (Zionist) =

British Zionist intellectual and civil servant

Sir Leon Simon CB
- אריה (לאון) סימון
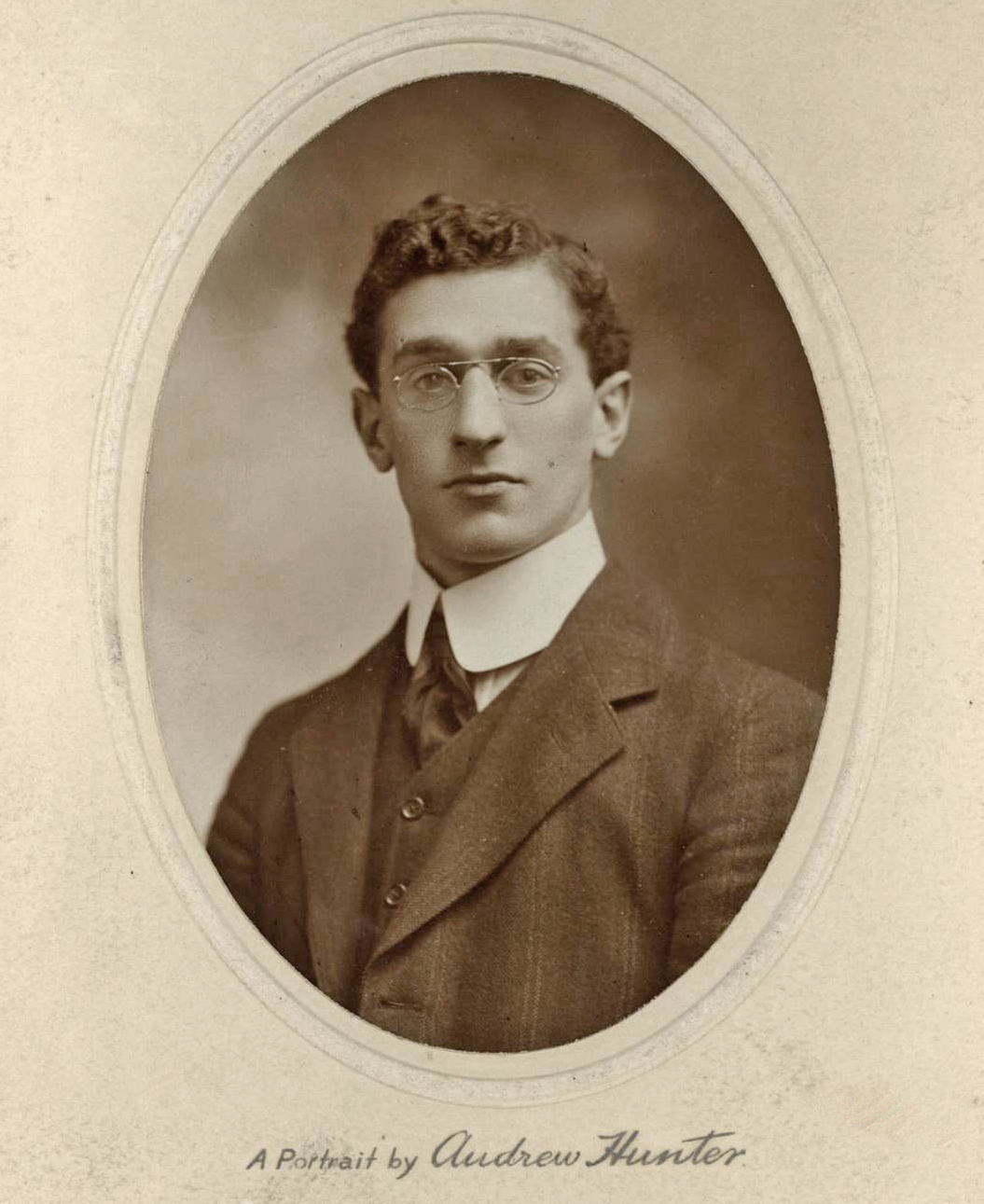
- Simon in 1911
- Born: 11 July 1881; Southampton, England
- Died: 27 April 1965 (aged 83); London, England
- Education: Balliol College, Oxford
- Occupation: Civil servant
- Years active: 1904–1949
- Known for: Cultural Zionist, writer, Hebrew scholar, political activist
- Spouse: Ellen Simon (m. 1916)

Sir Leon Simon CB (Hebrew: אריה (לאון) סימון; 11 July 1881 – 27 April 1965) was a leading British Zionist intellectual and civil servant who took part in the drafting of the Balfour Declaration of 1917 and served on the Zionist Commission with Chaim Weizmann. An advocate of cultural Zionism and the revival of Hebrew language, Simon was a scholar and translator of Ahad Ha'am, and produced the first modern Hebrew translations of Plato. He served as the chairman of the Hebrew University of Jerusalem's executive council, and from 1949 to 1950 as the university's president.

== Early life and education ==
Simon was the son of Rabbi Isadore Simon of the South Manchester Synagogue and Kitty Avner, both of whom had moved to Britain in the late 19th century from Lithuania. He studied at Manchester Grammar School and read Greats at Balliol College at the University of Oxford.

In Manchester he became a core part of a group of young anglicised Jewish intellectuals that congregated around Chaim Weizmann. The group included the journalist Harry Sacher, Samuel Landman, Israel Sieff and Simon Marks of Marks & Spencer. All of them had studied at Manchester Grammar School.

The group were members of the Manchester Zionist Association, where Simon and his brother Maurice Simon would hold discussions in Hebrew. Charles Dreyfus, Weizmann's employer in Manchester, was the president of the society.

Simon edited the newspaper The Zionist Banner with Sacher, and the monthly journal Palestine.

In 1904 Simon joined the General Post Office and rose to become Director of Telegraphs and Telephones and later Director of Savings. He was made CB in 1931 and was knighted in 1944. He married Ellen Umanski, (later called by the name Lady Ellen Simon), and they had two daughters.

== Cultural Zionist ==
Under the influence of Chaim Weizmann, whose family had immigrated from Belarus to Manchester, Simon belonged to the first generation of leading British Jews who preferred Zionism to conventional religiosity and who pressed for Hebrew to supplant Yiddish as the main language of the diaspora.

Simon came under the influence of Ahad Ha'am (Asher Zvi Hirsch Ginsberg), a leading figure of cultural Zionism, and went on to translate many of his works into English as well as writing his biography.

=== Language revival ===
He also wrote the first translations into modern Hebrew of John Stuart Mill's Essay on Liberty, and of several of Plato's Dialogues, work for which he received the Tchernichovsky Prize.

=== Balfour Declaration ===
A draft of the Balfour Declaration, written by Simon on paper of London's Imperial Hotel on July 17, 1917, was auctioned off in 2005 through Sotheby's for $884,000 US in New York. It is the only known surviving handwritten draft of the declaration.

The draft of the declaration noted down by Simon read:

"H(is) M(ajesty's) G(overnment) accepts the principle that P(alestine) should be reconstituted as the Nat(ional) Home of the J(ewish) P(eople). HMG will use its best efforts to secure the achievement of this object, and will discuss the necessary methods and means with the Z(ionist) O(rganization)."

Simon accompanied Weizmann as a member of the Zionist Commission alongside Israel Sieff, M. D. Eder and others in 1918 to begin talks with the government of David Lloyd George on the establishment of a Jewish State in Palestine.

== Career ==
From 1946 to 1953 Simon lived in Jerusalem where he served as Chair of the Executive Council of the Hebrew University and from 1949 to 1950 as its president, preceded by Judah Leon Magnes and followed by Selig Brodetsky (1949–1952). He also served as President of Israel Postal Company Bank.

== Published works ==
Simon wrote several works on Zionism, including Zionism and the Jewish Problem published in 1917 and Studies in Jewish Nationalism published in 1920. A collection of his papers are held at Duke University.

== Works ==
- Zionism and the Jewish Problem (1917)
- "Studies in Jewish Nationalism" (1920)
- Ahad Ha-Am (1927, Biography)
- Synopsis of the Haskalah Movement (1934)
- The Elements of Zionism for Young Zionists (1934)
- "Religion and Nationality". The Menorah Journal. 1919.

== See also ==
- Chaim Weizmann
- Tchernichovsky Prize Recipients
- Knight Bachelor
- 1944 Knighthood Awardees
