= Yehoshua Barzillai =

Early Zionist leader (1855–1918)

Yehoshua Barzilai
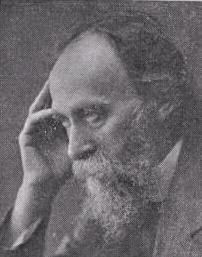
- Born: Yehoshua Eisenstadt; August 20, 1855; Navahrudak, Belarus
- Died: May 2, 1918 (aged 62); Lausen, Basel-Landschaft, Switzerland
- Occupation: Founder of B'nei Moshe
- Known for: Leader of Hovevei Zion

Yehoshua Barzilai-Eisenstadt (August 20, 1855 – May 2, 1918) was an early Zionist leader and writer. He was one of the founders of the covert B'nei Moshe organization, and a leader of the Hovevei Zion movement.

== Biography ==
Barzillai was born in Belarus, then part of the Russian Empire, to a rabbinical family. In Ottoman Palestine he co-founded the organization B'nei Moshe.

He also served as secretary for Hovevei Zion in Jaffa, traveling extensively across the new settlements in the Land of Israel and becoming a key contact for pioneers' inquiries. From 1894 to 1895, he was the head librarian at Beit Ariela.

He was a co-founder of the Rehavia Gymnasium in Jerusalem, Israel's first modern high school.

== Death ==
During World War I, he relocated to Switzerland, where he died in 1918. Seven years later, his remains were interred on the Mount of Olives.
