= International House Xi'an =

Coordinates: 34.227080°N 108.909894°E

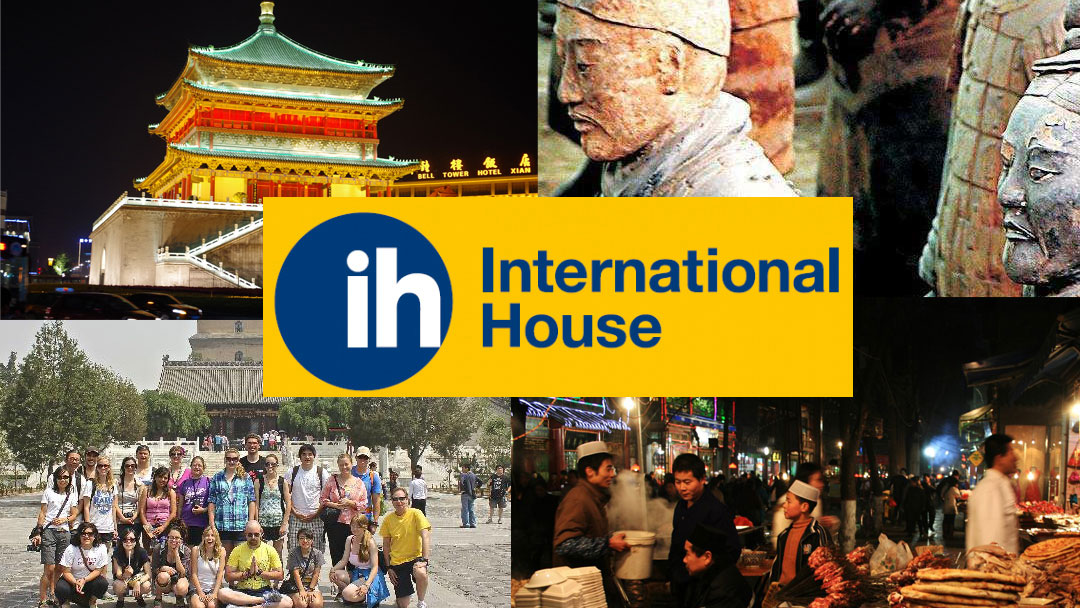
- Xi'an, Shaanxi; China

Information
- Type: Language School
- Established: 2006
- Website: ihxian.com

International House Xi'an, commonly referred to as IH Xi'an or simply IH, is located in Xi'an, Shaanxi, China. International House Xi'an was founded in 2006. International house is a language training center for Mandarin Chinese, German, English, Spanish, French, and Korean.

== History ==
International House started out as Intertex language training before becoming affiliated with the International House Brand. While Su Peng trained as a psychologist in Hamburg, Germany, he was approached by students that wanted to learn Chinese. On returning to China, he found many local Chinese students were very interested in Europe and European languages. After deciding to open a language school in 2005 it took over a year to prepare and establish. International House quickly became popular and is now the premier language learning center in Xi'an.

== Affiliations ==
International House Xi'an is officially affiliated with International House World Organisation.

== Programs ==
- International House language Immersion: focuses on Mandarin Chinese language and culture learning through immersion and one-on-one courses.
- International House Summer internship: program helps University Students to gain experience in China for a summer with certification and living costs provided.
