= International House London =

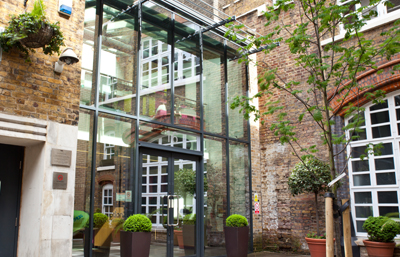
- International House entrance
- Type: Language school
- Established: 1957
- Students: 8,000
- Location: Haycraft House, 16 Stukeley Street, London, UK; WC2B 5LQ; 51.515857°N 0.123556°W
- Website: International House London
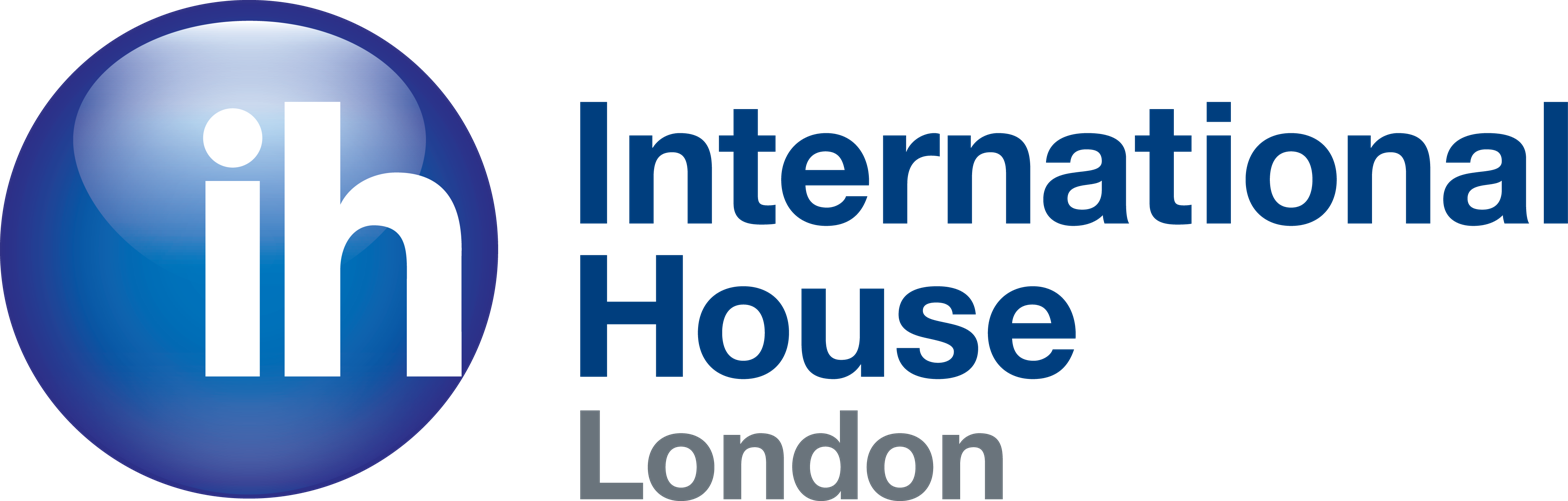

International House London is a language school in Covent Garden, London, United Kingdom owned by International House Trust. International Trust is a not-for-profit charitable organisation established by John Haycraft to provide English language instruction and teacher training. Each year International House London educates 8,000 students from over 150 countries.

== History ==
International House was founded in 1953 when John Haycraft and Brita Haycraft opened their first language school in Cordoba, Spain. In 1974 they set up a non-profit International Trust to help raise the standards of English language teaching and training worldwide. John Haycraft sought to promote international understanding through language learning and teacher training. He introduced the first training programme for teachers of English as a foreign language, which blended teaching theory and practice.

In 1957, International House London was established in premises at Endell Street and initially offered students courses to improve their English language skills. Over time it grew, offering more courses and moving to larger premises, first to Shaftsbury Avenue in 1961 and then onto 106 Piccadilly in 1977 and finally to Covent Garden in 2007. International House London added teacher training in 1962, business executive courses in 1986 and foreign language courses in 1989.

== Campus and Facilities ==
Since 2007, International House London has been situated in Covent Garden in purpose-built premises. It is the largest single-site language school in London.

The campus has 56 classrooms, a café and a library with over 10,000 books and journals.

More than 8,000 students from over 150 different nationalities study at International House London language school each year.

== Accreditation ==
International House London is accredited by the British Council and EAQUALS and is a member of English UK, the leading professional association for accrediting language schools. A founder member of the International House World Organisation (IHWO),
