= Yehuda Gur =

Israeli writer

- יְהוּדָה גוּר
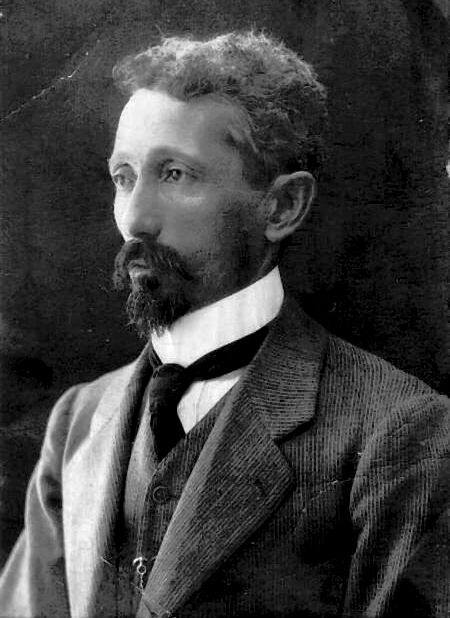
- Born: 31 December 1862; Pogost, Minsk Governorate, Russian Empire
- Died: 21 January 1950 (aged 87); Tel Aviv-Jaffa, Israel
- Resting place: Trumpeldor Cemetery
- Writing career
- Notable awards: Bialik Prize (1946)

Yehuda Gur (Hebrew: יְהוּדָה גוּר; 31 December 1862 – 21 January 1950), born Yehuda Leib Grozovski (Hebrew: יְהוּדָה לֵיבּ גְרָזוֹבְסקי) was a Russian-born Israeli linguist, educator, writer, and translator. He received the Bialik Prize for Jewish Thought in 1946.

== Biography ==
Gur was born in 1862 in Pohost, Minsk Governorate of the Russian Empire (in Belarus within the Pale of Settlement), to Isaiah Reuben Gurzovsky, a descendant of the prominent rabbinical family of Maharshak. He studied in a cheder and yeshiva in his hometown, and later for three years at the Volozhin Yeshiva. Subsequently, he moved to Vilna to study literature. While in Vilna, he befriended the Vilna Haskalah movement and decided to immigrate to the Land of Israel. In Vilna, he learned the craft of photography, intending to make a living from it in the Land of Israel. In Sivan 1887, he immigrated to the Land of Israel as part of the First Aliyah.

In Israel, he initially worked in agriculture and later in a shop in Jaffa. He eventually began teaching in Mazkeret Batya, where he was the first Hebrew teacher. In Mazkeret Batya, he married Rachel, daughter of Mordechai Naiman, one of the founders of the moshav. During this period, he organized, together with Yehuda Leib Yudlewitz, a conference of Hebrew teachers in Israel, considered the foundation of the Teachers' Federation. Gurzovsky later moved to Zikhron Ya'akov, where in 1891 he and the teacher Haim Ziprin introduced the method of teaching Hebrew in Hebrew.

Gurzovsky, along with David Yudilovich and Eliezer Ben-Yehuda, edited the first children's Hebrew newspaper, Olam Katan, which was published in 1892 in seven issues over ten months.

After a short period, Gurzovsky moved to Jaffa, where he taught at the school of Israel Belkind and served as the secretary of the B'nei Moshe society. He believed in the vision of establishing a Hebrew school that would train a Hebrew generation in the Land of Israel and worked with his colleagues to realize this idea. When Belkind's school closed in 1892, the schools of the Alliance Israélite Universelle were established in Jaffa, and Gurzovsky taught at the girls' school. In 1896, a higher department for training Hebrew teachers was established within the school of the Alliance, but its administration ordered its closure due to disagreement with the vision of a Hebrew school. Gurzovsky and his colleagues continued to teach the higher department without receiving payment.

The school in Jaffa became the target of criticism from religious circles, and Gurzovsky, who was publicly seen desecrating Shabbat, became a primary target. A significant controversy arose over the nature of education between the Bnei Moshe members in Jaffa and Eliezer Ben-Yehuda on one side, and Yechiel Michel Pines and the Old Yishuv intellectuals on the other. Gurzovsky was one of the leading speakers against the Old Yishuv and in favor of Eliezer Ben-Yehuda.

Later, he served as a teacher at Mikveh Israel, and in 1898 he was present at the historic meeting of Theodor Herzl with Emperor Wilhelm II during his visit to Israel, which took place at the school gate.

In 1906, Gur moved to Beirut, where he worked at Anglo-Palestine Bank. In 1911, he returned to Israel and became the manager of the Jaffa branch of Anglo-Palestine Bank, a position he held until 1929. As part of this role, he was a member of the Netaim Association board. During his work, he purchased lands in Tel Aviv and Haifa for the Jewish settlement. During World War I, he was exiled to Damascus.

Yehuda Gur died on 21 January 1950, and was buried at the Trumpeldor Cemetery in Tel Aviv.

His personal archive is preserved at the National Library of Israel.

== Family ==
Gur was the father of three sons (Asaf, Amihud, and Isaiah-Shai) and two daughters (Hadassah Samuel and Nechama Ornstein). His three sons pursued careers in agriculture – plantations, forestry, and livestock breeding.

His son Asaf Gur (1894–1982) was an agronomist specializing in fruit tree cultivation. He was responsible for the country's plantations from 1929 until 1963 (as the chief officer of plantations in the agricultural department of the British Mandate government, and after the establishment of the state, director of the plantations department in the Ministry of Agriculture).

His son Dr. Amihud Gur (1898–1982) was a world-renowned forester who served for many years as the director of the government forestry department until it merged with the forestry department of the Jewish National Fund. He was married to Shifra, daughter of Moshe Smilansky. His son Dr. Shai Gur was the director of Israel's veterinary services. He married Tzella, daughter of Tuvia Ziskind Miller, a leading figure in the Farmers' Association. Shai died in 1986 and was the last person to be buried in the Jewish Cemetery in Jaffa after six decades of no burials there.

His daughter Hadassah married Edwin Samuel, the eldest son of the first British High Commissioner Herbert Samuel. She served as chairwoman of WIZO in Israel between 1933–1950 and concurrently as chair of the Council of Women's Organizations in Israel between 1936–1946.

== Literary work ==
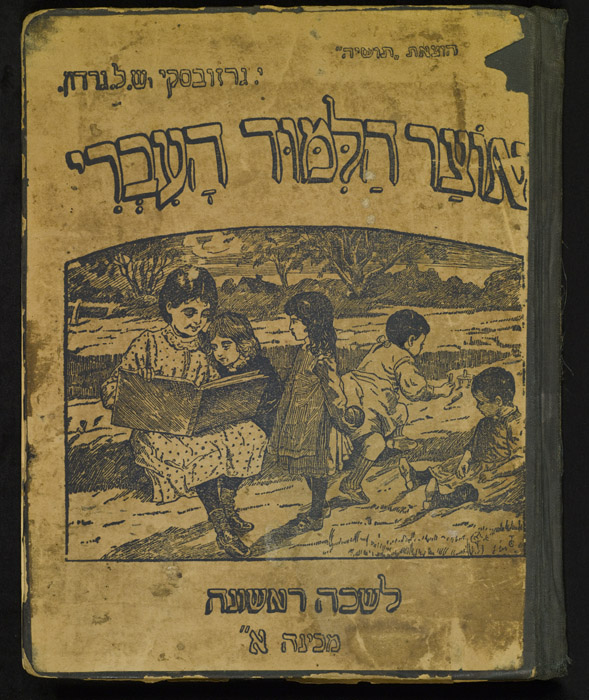
The treasure of Hebrew study. by Y. Grzowski,1904

Gur was an author, journalist, editor, and prolific translator. He published numerous articles in newspapers during the educational controversies, and as a teacher, he produced textbooks in Hebrew on various subjects. Together with Ziprin, he published a Hebrew textbook titled "The Hebrew School" in 1891.

In 1892, Gurzovsky participated in publishing the children's magazine Olam Katan along with Eliezer Ben-Yehuda and David Yudilovich. The magazine ran for seven issues over ten months.

Among his works are a comprehensive 600-page Hebrew dictionary titled "Useful Dictionary of the Hebrew Language," published in numerous editions, books, and hundreds of articles in various journals and newspapers. He was the editor of the children's magazine Olam Katan, and one of the pioneers of teaching "Hebrew in Hebrew".

He translated into Hebrew the stories of Hans Christian Andersen, Mark Twain, Charles Dickens, and Jules Verne, as well as the book Robinson Crusoe.

In 1896, he published a pocket dictionary (with Yosef Klausner). Later, he published other small dictionaries. In 1920, he published a Hebrew illustrated dictionary with David Yellin. From 1937, he worked on creating the "Useful Dictionary of the Hebrew Language," whose final expanded edition was published in 1947. In 1939, the first edition of his book "Lexicon for Foreign Words" was published.

In 1947, he was awarded the Bialik Prize for Jewish thought, for his "Hebrew Dictionary."

== Hebrew Language Dictionary ==
The Hebrew dictionary he published between 1935–1937 was his life's work, on which he labored for many years. The dictionary was published with the help of Hayim Nahman Bialik and Yehoshua Hana Ravnitzky, who carefully reviewed the drafts and made significant linguistic notes, most of which were accepted by the author. The dictionary compiled words from biblical, Talmudic, Midrashic, and poetic literature, as well as words from philosophical, exegetical, and polemical texts. It also included words from the literature of the Geonim and Karaites, modern literature, and even legal and kabbalistic texts. The dictionary is notable for its brevity and precision. In the introduction to his dictionary, Gurzovsky wrote: "The character of this dictionary is primarily practical, not scientific, popular rather than research-based... The principles of our sages: 'Everything in excess is like it is missing' and 'Whoever adds, subtracts,' were always before the author's eyes in arranging the book... The author also made a new attempt in this dictionary: he included the different uses of the language: for verbs - the letters and particles of usage, and for nouns - the verbs that typically accompany them in Scripture, and in this, considerable work was invested, as there is no specific book in our literature on this subject."

== Educational philosophy ==
Gur believed in establishing a unified curriculum for all students in the Land of Israel. The curriculum, in his view, was intended to build a Hebrew generation according to the vision of his friend Ahad Ha'am. He opposed rote learning and supported developing critical thinking. He believed in the revival of the Hebrew language and was one of the first four families to join Eliezer Ben-Yehuda's initiative "Speaking Hebrew in Jerusalem," meaning they spoke only Hebrew during their stay in Jerusalem.

== Books ==
- Hebrew School, Warsaw: Tushiya, 1899.
- Beginning of the Study of Hebrew Language, Warsaw: Tushiya, 1902.
- The Land of Israel, Warsaw: Tushiya, 1903. Includes a map of the Land of Israel.
- Chanukah: A Chapter from the History of Israel, Warsaw: Tushiya, 1904.
- Summary of the History of the Jewish People, Warsaw: Tushiya, 1913.
- Selection of Legends: (A Selection of Jewish Legends): A Book for Study and Reading, Warsaw, 1924.
- Ahad Ha'am and His Attitude Towards the Hebrew Language, Tel Aviv, 1927.
- Hebrew Dictionary by Yehuda Gurzovsky. Tel Aviv, Dvir, 1935–1937.
- The Hebrew Dictionary: Practical Dictionary with Illustrations, Yehuda Gurzovsky and David Yellin, Dvir Publishing, 1919.
- Practical Dictionary of the Hebrew Language by Yehuda Gurzovsky. Tel Aviv, Dvir Publishing, 1938.
- Pocket Hebrew-Yiddish Dictionary, co-authored with Miriam Wolman-Schercheck. Tel Aviv, Dvir Publishing, 1930.
- Dictionary for the Student and the Immigrant, by Yehuda Gurzovsky, Tel Aviv, Dvir Publishing, 1948.
- Lexicon for Foreign Words by Yehuda Gurzovsky, Tel Aviv, Dvir Publishing, 1939. (5th edition, 1952)
- Pocket Hebrew-French Dictionary (Hebrew section by Yehuda Gur), Tel Aviv, Dvir Publishing, 1953.
- Pocket Hebrew-German Dictionary by Yehuda Gur, Tel Aviv, Dvir Publishing, 1969. (Printed in 10 editions)
- Estimation of Origin-Destination Tables from Transport Literature: A Literature Survey, Haifa, Israel Institute of Transportation Research, Technion - Israel Institute of Technology, 1982.
