= B'nei Moshe =

Zionist organization

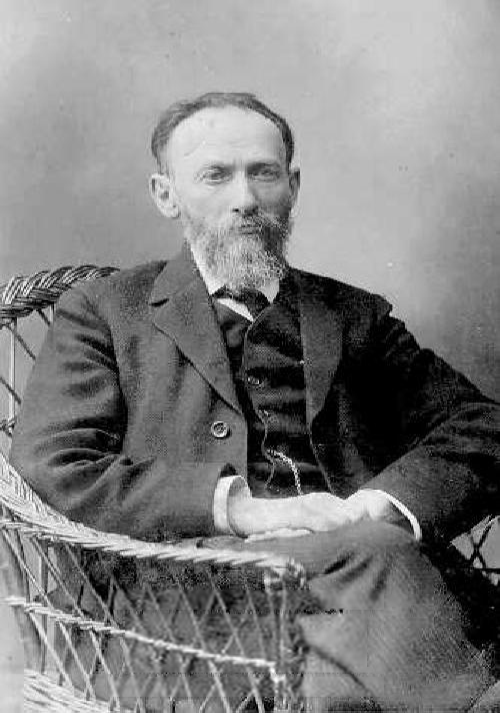
Yehoshua Barzillai

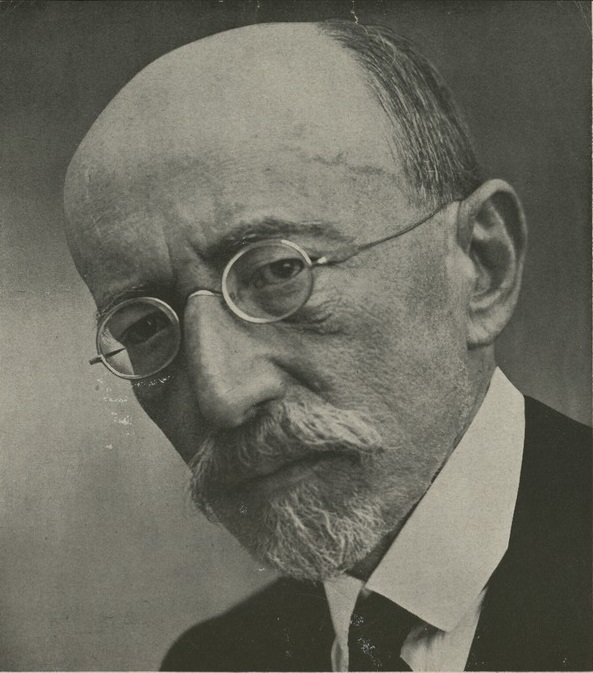
Ahad Ha'am

B'nei Moshe (Hebrew: בני משה, "Children of Moses", variously transliterated as Bnai Moshe, Benei Moshe, Bene Mosheh, etc.) was a Zionist organization. It was established as a secret organization in Odessa in 1889 on the day Seventh of Adar, which is considered the day of death and birth of Moses. While its originator was Yehoshua Barzillai (Eisenstadt), Ahad Ha'am was persuaded to take leadership of the organization. Its ideology was described as "cultural Zionism", as opposed to the political Zionism.

In 1893, its headquarters were moved to Jaffa and it ceased to be secretive. It was suggested that it become a political party, however, internal controversies and frustration led to its disestablishment in 1897.

Its membership was about 160 persons. Its major practical achievements include improvements in Hebrew education, in particular, establishing modernized heders (heder metukkan); helping in establishing the Rehovot settlement, and establishing a Hebrew publishing house Ahi'asaf in Warsaw, the first one of the kind. It published the annual Ahi'asaf Tablet (Hebrew: לוח אחיאסף) almanac (1893–1904) by a large group of writers and intellectuals, members of B'nei Moshe, from many different fields.

== Notable members ==
- Ahad Ha'am
- Chaim Weizmann
- Avraham Freidenberg, lawyer, educator, Zionist activist, and literary editor, He headed B'nei Moshe in Kremenchuk after he was appointed "crown rabbi" there
- Avraham Moshe Bernstein, hazzan, choirmeister, composer, musicologist, writer. Member of B'nei Moshe since 1899. His music was popular in B'nei Moshe.
- Ben-Avigdor (Abraham Leib Shelkovich), writer, secretary of B'nei Moshe in Warsaw, pioneer of modern Hebrew publishing in Eastern Europe. In particular, he took part in the founding of Ahi'asaf
- Hayim Margolis-Kalwariski, agronomist, land purchaser on behalf of the Jewish Colonization Association, secretary of B'nei Moshe in Jaffa
- Menachem Ussishkin
- Yehoshua Barzillai
- Yehuda Gur, linguist, educator, writer, and translator. Together with Barzillai, he edited the B'nei Moshe monthly Mikhtavim me-Erez Yisrael ("Letters from Erez Israel", 1893–94).
