= Cultural Zionism =

Strain in concept of Zionism

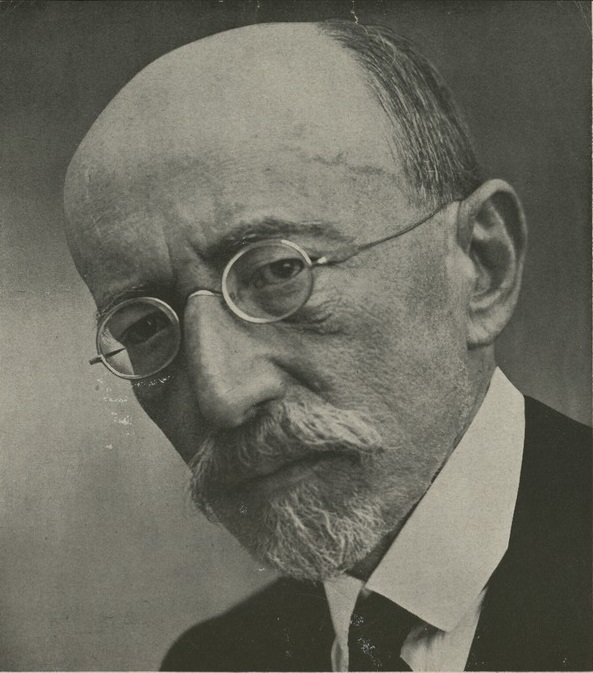
Ahad Ha'am (Asher Ginsberg)

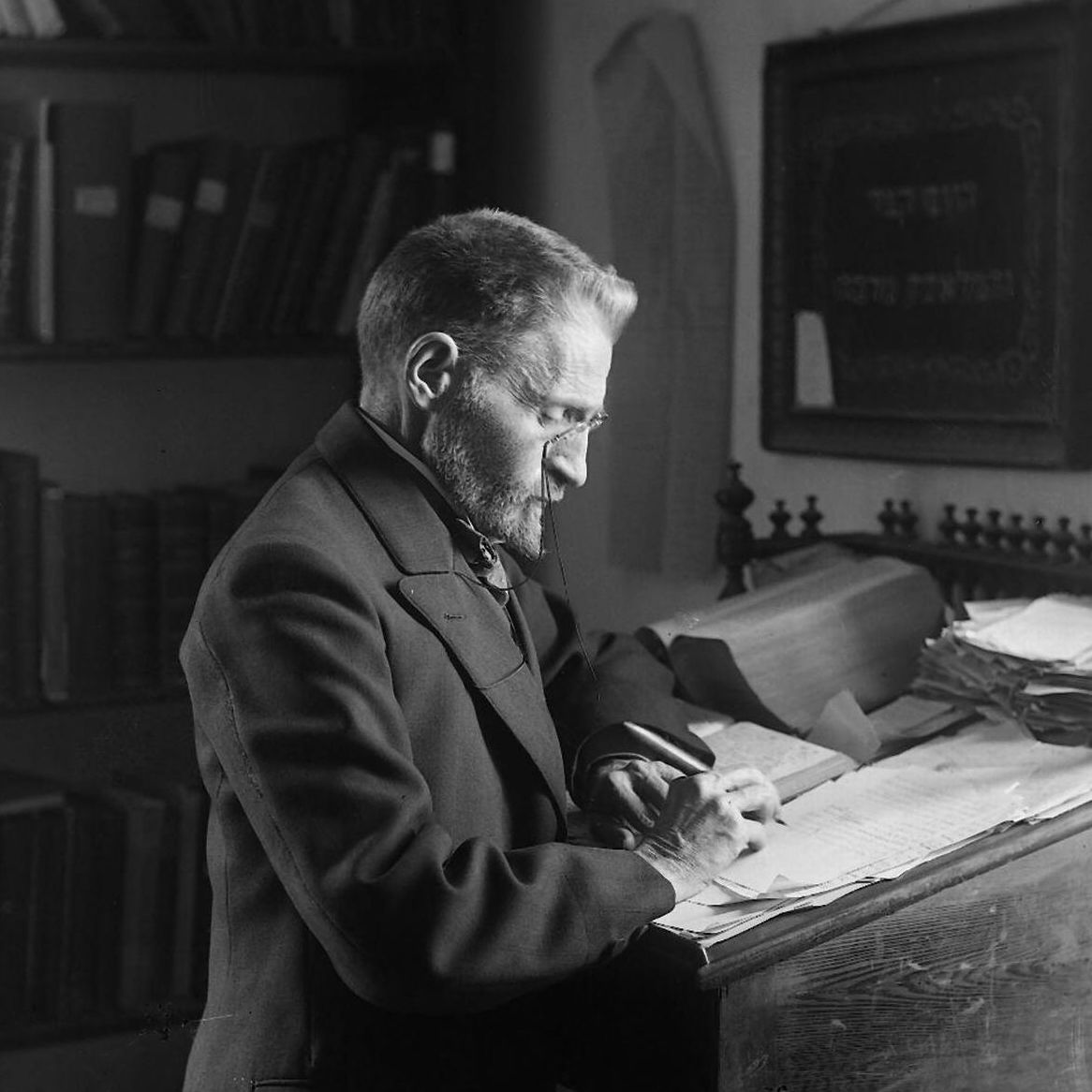
Eliezer Ben-Yehuda, working in his house in the Talpiot neighborhood.

Cultural Zionism (Hebrew: צִיּוֹנוּת רוּחָנִית, romanized: Tsiyonut ruchanit, lit. 'Spiritual Zionism') is a strain of Zionism that focused on creating a center in historic Palestine with its own secular Jewish culture and national history, including language and historical roots. Unlike Political Zionism, it did not necessarily favor the creation of an independent Jewish state in Palestine, and was opposed to the creation of such a state anywhere other than Palestine. The founder of Cultural Zionism is Asher Ginsberg, better known as Ahad Ha'am. With his secular vision of a Jewish "spiritual center" in Eretz Israel/Palestine, he confronted Theodor Herzl. Unlike Herzl, the founder of political Zionism, Ha'am strove for "a Jewish state and not merely a state of Jews".

== History ==
In the 19th century, the twin forces of Jewish assimilation and racial antisemitism created concern throughout the Jewish Diaspora about the preservation of Jewish culture. Prominent Jewish figures of the time, such as Ahad Ha’am, felt that secular modernity threatened Jewish culture. From this fear of losing their identity as a distinct people, and building upon ideas developed during the Jewish enlightenment era, Cultural Zionism was born. Ha'am, the most prominent figure in this movement, believed the survival of Jewish culture depended on the creation of a spiritual center for the Jewish people in Palestine, their ancestral homeland.

Originally, Ahad Ha'am saw problems in Judaism and sought out ways to revitalize the religious community and the religion itself to regenerate interest in Judaism's adherents, especially its youth. He saw nationalism as a way to reconnect Jews to Judaism, putting forth ideas of creating settlements in Eretz Yisrael (Palestine) filled with well-versed Hebrew-speakers and a core adherence to Judaism. He saw the land of Israel and the Hebrew language as integral parts of the Jewish national heritage, and not necessarily of religious significance.

He viewed Theodor Herzl, an Austrian-Jewish journalist who was a proponent of political Zionism, as naive to suggest creating a Jewish state in any other area of the world. Neither did Ahad Ha'am trust other countries to help realize the Zionist goal of creating a Jewish state in Palestine, nor anywhere else for that matter. Ahad HaAm emphasized "Jewish self-reliance" over any other precept, as well as careful planning in infrastructure and construction of a Jewish footing in the Holy Land.

Ahad Ha'am recognized that the effort to achieve independence in the land of Israel would bring Jews into conflict with the native Arab population, as well as with the Ottomans and European colonial powers then eying the country. Instead, he proposed that the emphasis of the Zionist movement shift to efforts to revive the Hebrew language and create a new culture, free from negative diaspora influences, that would unite Jews and serve as a common denominator between diverse Jewish communities. The main goal of Ahad Ha'am's Cultural Zionism was the establishment of a new spiritual center for the Jewish nation, which did not necessarily require the establishment of a Jewish state, but did require the establishment of a Jewish majority in its national home. Ahad Ha'am believed that securing a secularized identity would allow for a culturally rich Jewish nation to form.

The idea took hold in adherents to the school of political Zionism and became a main focus of the World Zionist Organization following its sixth congress in 1903. Following Herzl's death, Ahad Ha'am became the main leader of the WZO along with Chaim Weizmann, who energized the Zionist movement with ideas for a regeneration of the Hebrew language, establishment of Jewish settlements in Palestine, and resurrecting nationalism with Jews in the Jewish Diaspora.

The most prominent follower of this idea was Eliezer Ben-Yehuda, a linguist intent on the revival of the Hebrew language among Jews. Most European Jews in the 19th century spoke Yiddish, a language based on medieval German, but as of the 1880s, Ben Yehuda and his supporters began promoting the use and teaching of a modernised form of biblical Hebrew, which had not been a living language for nearly 2,000 years. Despite Herzl's efforts to have German proclaimed the official language of the Zionist movement, the use of Hebrew was adopted as official policy by Zionist organizations in Palestine, and served as an important unifying force among the Jewish settlers, many of whom also took new Hebrew names.

Other cultural Zionists attempted to create new Jewish art forms, including graphic arts. (Boris Schatz, a Bulgarian artist, founded the Bezalel Academy of Arts and Design in Jerusalem in 1906.) Others, such as dancer and artist Baruch Agadati, fostered popular festivals such as the Adloyada carnival on Purim.

Currently, American Jewry has been influenced by Cultural Zionism since its movement by focusing on creating a spiritual community in America that is not explicitly tied to a political entity.

== Opposition from within Zionism ==
Critics of Ahad Ha’am’s Cultural Zionism diverged from multiple perspectives within the Zionist project. Opposition to Ha'am's ideology often prioritized political action, practical steps towards statehood, and the challenges of establishing a Jewish state. Political Zionist Theodor Herzl contested Ha’am’s notions of cultural revival, prioritizing the urgency of political action and Jewish statehood as direct solution to antisemitism. Similar to Herzl’s political vision, the first president of Israel, Chaim Weizmann, proposed practical steps towards a Jewish state and was wary of Ahad Ha'am's cultural approach. He claimed physical establishments in Palestine took precedence over spiritual renewal, necessary for thriving Jewish political activity. Additionally, political leader and first prime minister of Israel, David Ben-Gurion challenged the practicality of Cultural Zionism, concentrating on a pragmatic process of state-building. Although Ben-Gurion agreed with Ha’am over the importance of cultural resurgence, his ideas differed in addressing the immediate obstacles standing in the way of a Jewish State.

== American perspective ==
Ahad Ha’am’s beliefs garnered support from Americans who supported the idea of a binationalist solution and did not necessarily agree with all the tenets of Political Zionism. Many Americans had reservations about the displacement of Arab people in Palestine and supported the idea of a united binational state where both Arabs and Jewish people would live together. Culture Zionism had the appeal of providing a platform that prioritized the preservation of Jewish identity, heritage, and culture. Ahad Ha'am's emphasis on the development of Hebrew culture, literature, and education appealed to many American Jews who wanted to maintain their Jewish identity, even while living in diaspora.

The American Cultural Zionism movement built off of Ahad Ha’am’s framework, advocating for the creation of a national Jewish center not only in Palestine, but also in the United States. Members of the movement wanted the spiritual and intellectual community that Ha’am sought to create in Palestine to be felt throughout the Jewish Diaspora regardless of whether or not people chose to immigrate to Palestine. Israel Knox, an American philosopher and prominent Cultural Zionist, released an article called “Is America Exile or Home” in 1946 that analyzed the emergence of cultural Zionism and its effect on American Jewish people. He promoted three main points for establishing American Jewry which included refraining from political Zionism, creating centers for worship and tradition in America, and pushing funding for communal growth. Both Knox and Ha’am advocated for the creation of Jewish spiritual centers, Ha’am in Palestine and Knox in the United States. This core tenet of Cultural Zionism was popular among American Jews at the time.

== See also ==
- B'nei Moshe
- Cultural Judaism
- Revival of the Hebrew language
- Leon Simon
- Secular Zionism
