= John Haycraft =

John Haycraft CBE
- Born: John Stacpoole Haycraft; 11 December 1926; Quetta, British India (now in Pakistan)
- Died: 23 May 1996 (aged 69)
- Education: Wellington College; Jesus College, Oxford; Yale University
- Relatives: John Berry Haycraft (grandfather); Sir Thomas Haycraft (great-uncle)

John Stacpoole Haycraft CBE (11 December 1926 – 23 May 1996) was an English language teacher and author who founded the International House World Organisation, which has shaped the evolution of the profession of English language teaching (ELT).

== Early life ==
He was born on 11 December 1926 in Quetta, Baluchistan Agency, British India, now in Pakistan. He was the son of William Church Stacpoole Haycraft (1891–1929), who was a British officer in the colonial Indian army. He was the grandson of John Berry Haycraft and great-nephew of Sir Thomas Haycraft. His mother was Olive Lillian Esmée (1901–1978). He had one younger brother, Colin Berry Haycraft (1929–1994). His father died when he was still young, killed by one of his soldiers.

His mother supported her family on a small army pension and worked as a tennis player.

== Education ==
He studied at Wellington, in Berkshire, where he showed his natural leadership qualities and became head boy. Later with his brother they came back to Britain, where they both studied at Oxford University – John matriculated from Jesus College in 1948 and obtained a second-class degree in modern history in 1951. Colin Haycraft became an editor and married Ann Margaret Lindholm, a writer and essayist.

After a postgraduate course at Yale, he was a tourist guide in Toledo and gave private English lessons.

== International House World Organisation ==
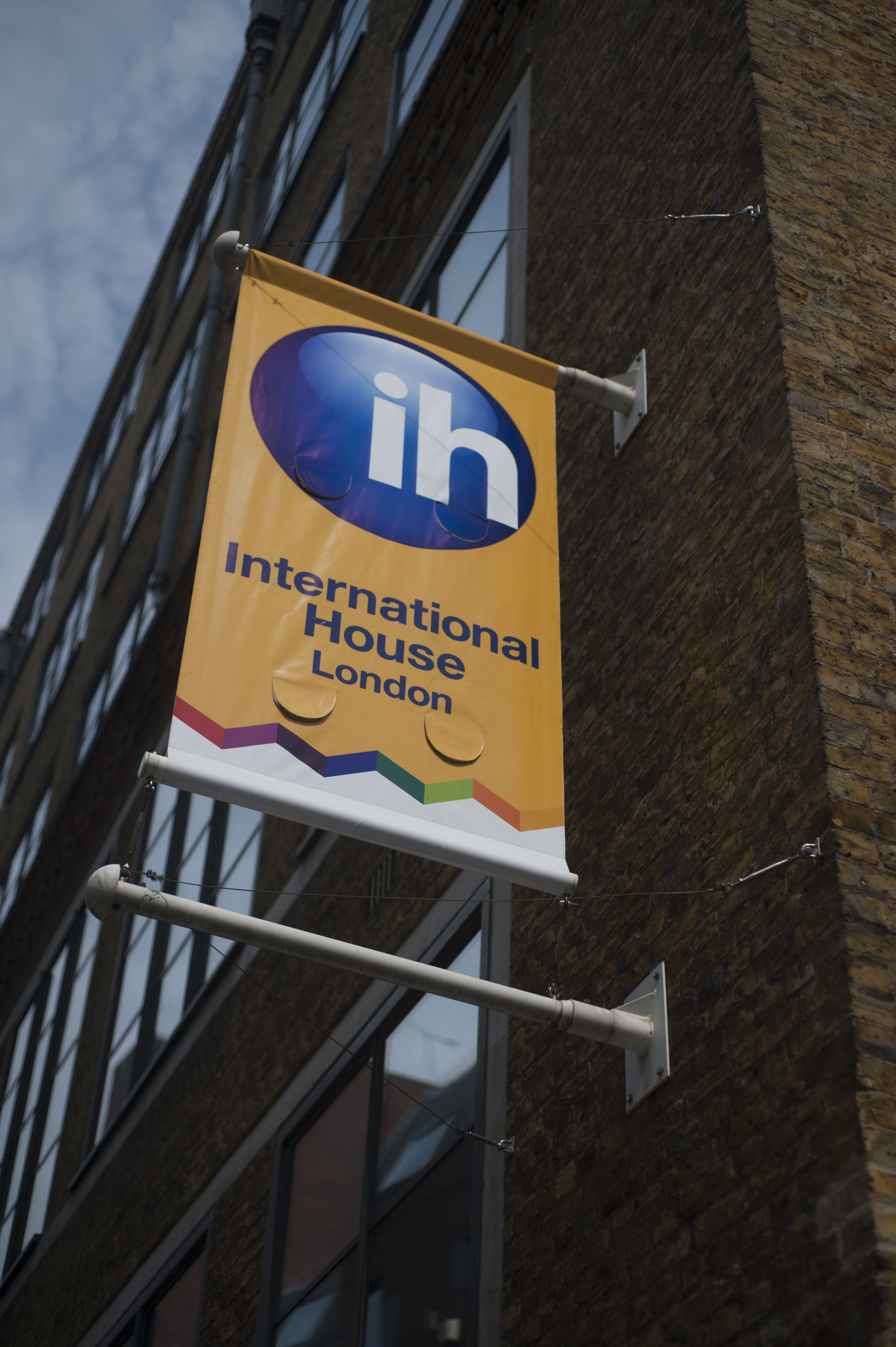
International House, London

The main creation of John Haycraft is International House World Organisation. It was started by John and his wife Brita Haycraft in Córdoba in 1953. A fervent internationalist, John strove to promote international understanding through language learning and teacher training. They were teaching and writing there from 1953 until 1959. This period he described in his autobiographical book Babel in Spain (1965).

In 1959 he returned to London. There he worked with his wife on his ideas such as raising the standards of the teaching of English and the practical training of teachers for the classroom. He wanted to set up intensive teacher-training courses to prepare people for multi-lingual classes.

In 1974 they set up a non-profit-making educational trust committed to raising the standards of English language teaching and training worldwide. International House Trust trades today as International House London.

He retired from International House in 1990. After that he decided start a project with the financier George Soros in order to establish schools in Central and Eastern Europe.

When he died on 23 May 1996, he left behind a network of 100 schools that grew from the first school in Córdoba in Spain to cover 40 countries.

He was appointed a Commander of the Most Excellent Order of the British Empire (CBE) by Queen Elizabeth II in the 1982 Birthday Honours.

== Works ==
- Babel in Spain, 1958. Republished in Spanish, 2007
- Babel in London, 1965.
- Autobiography of a Language Traveller, 1998.
- Getting On In English
- George and Elvira
- Choosing Your English
- Action
- Introduction To English Language Teaching
- Think, Then Speak
- Italian Labyrinth
- In Search Of The French Revolution
- Where Was I?
