= Ahiasaf =

Hebrew literary annual published in Poland

Ahiasaf was a Hebrew literary annual, that was published in Warsaw by the "Ahiasaf" Publication Society.

== History and profile ==
Ahiasaf was a Hebrew literary annual, that was published in Warsaw by the Ahiasaf Publication Society. It was founded in 1893, and had immediate success, both literary and financial. Though an almanac in form, its chief merit rests upon the literary portion forming the bulk of the annual.

Many of the best Hebrew writers, men like "Ahad-ha-Am" (A. Ginzberg), Moshe Leib Lilienblum, Reuben Brainin, and others, were among its regular contributors.

Ahiasaf folded in 1904 and was restarted in 1923, but permanently ceased publication the same year.
