= Beit Ariela =

Public library in Tel Aviv

Coordinates: 32.0767°N 34.7864°E

Beit Ariela Shaar Zion Library
- ספריית שער צין בית אריאלה
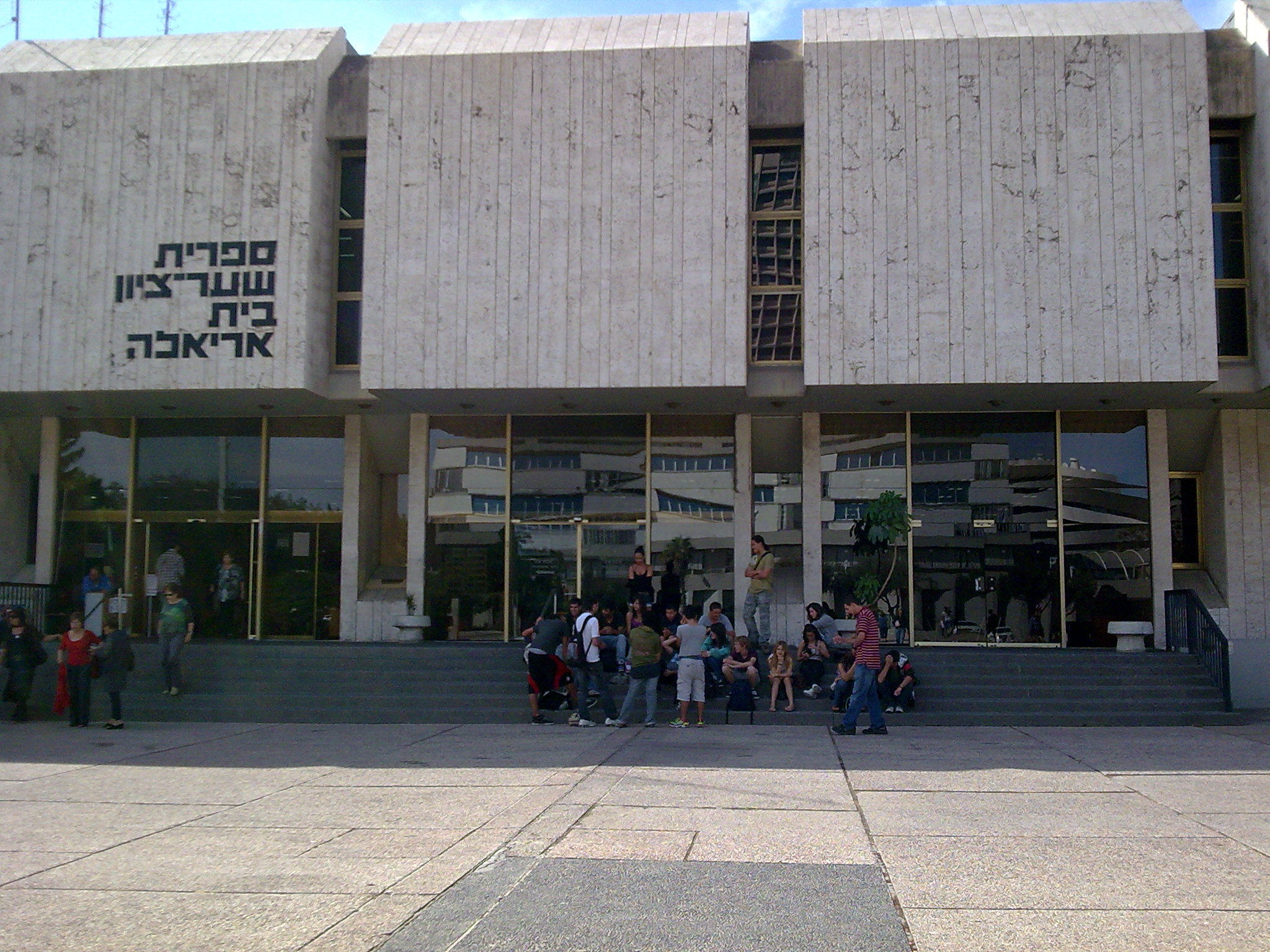
- Location: Tel Aviv, Israel
- Type: Public library
- Established: 1886
- Architects: Moshe Lufenfeld and Giora Gemerman
- Branches: 24

Collection
- Items collected: Books, journals, newspapers, magazines, sound and music recordings, databases, drawings, manuscripts and media

Access and use
- Access requirements: Tel Aviv residents - free
- Members: 65,000 (2025)

Other information
- Director: Dr. Uri Ellis
- Employees: 100
- Website: https://ariela.today/

Beit Ariela Shaar Zion Library (Hebrew: בית אריאלה שער ציון) is the central public library in Tel Aviv.

== History ==
=== Pre-State ===
The library was founded in 1886 in Jaffa at the initiative of the "Ezrat Israel" society ("Assistance to Israel") – the organization that helped to establish the first Jewish hospital in Jaffa and also initiated the construction of Neve Tzedek neighborhood. The library was named then "A book collection".

In 1891 some other communities, such as "Hovevei Zion" ("Lovers of Zion"), "B'nai B'rith" ("Sons of the Covenant") and "B'nei Moshe" ("Sons of Moses") associated in their support for the library, and since then the library changed its name to "Shaar Zion" ("The Gate of Zion").

In 1922 the library gained the status of Municipal Library. In the period from 1921 to 1936, it occupied the Polac building at the intersection of Herzl and Ahad Ha'am streets.

=== Since Israel's independence ===
The library later moved to Ze'ev Gloskin building on Montefiore Street. In the early 60s when the Herzliya Gymnasium building was torn down for the construction of the Shalom Meir Tower, the library building was also demolished and the library was temporarily moved to premises on Shaul HaMelech (King Saul) Boulevard, not far from the place dedicated for the construction of a new library building.

In 1977 the library was finally housed in its new building on Shaul HaMelech Boulevard. This new building was named Beit Ariela (Ariela's House) in honor of Ariela Gitter, daughter of Bernhard Benno Gitter (1919-2004), a businessman, who donated a large sum of money for its construction.

== Facilities and services ==
The Beit Ariela Library includes a reading hall, a lending department, and several special libraries. The Library includes more than half a million books in different languages (Hebrew, English, French, German, Russian, Spanish, and Yiddish). The Library provides its visitors access to databases in various fields of knowledge (in Hebrew and in English); registered borrowers may use this service from their homes. Besides the collections of books the Library possesses journals, newspapers, video recordings, photographs; the collection of musical CDs accounts about 8000. The Library subscribes to 180 different periodicals; there are about 9 thousand registered borrowers. The Library network throughout the City contains more than 21 branches and has around 37,201 (2018) active members.

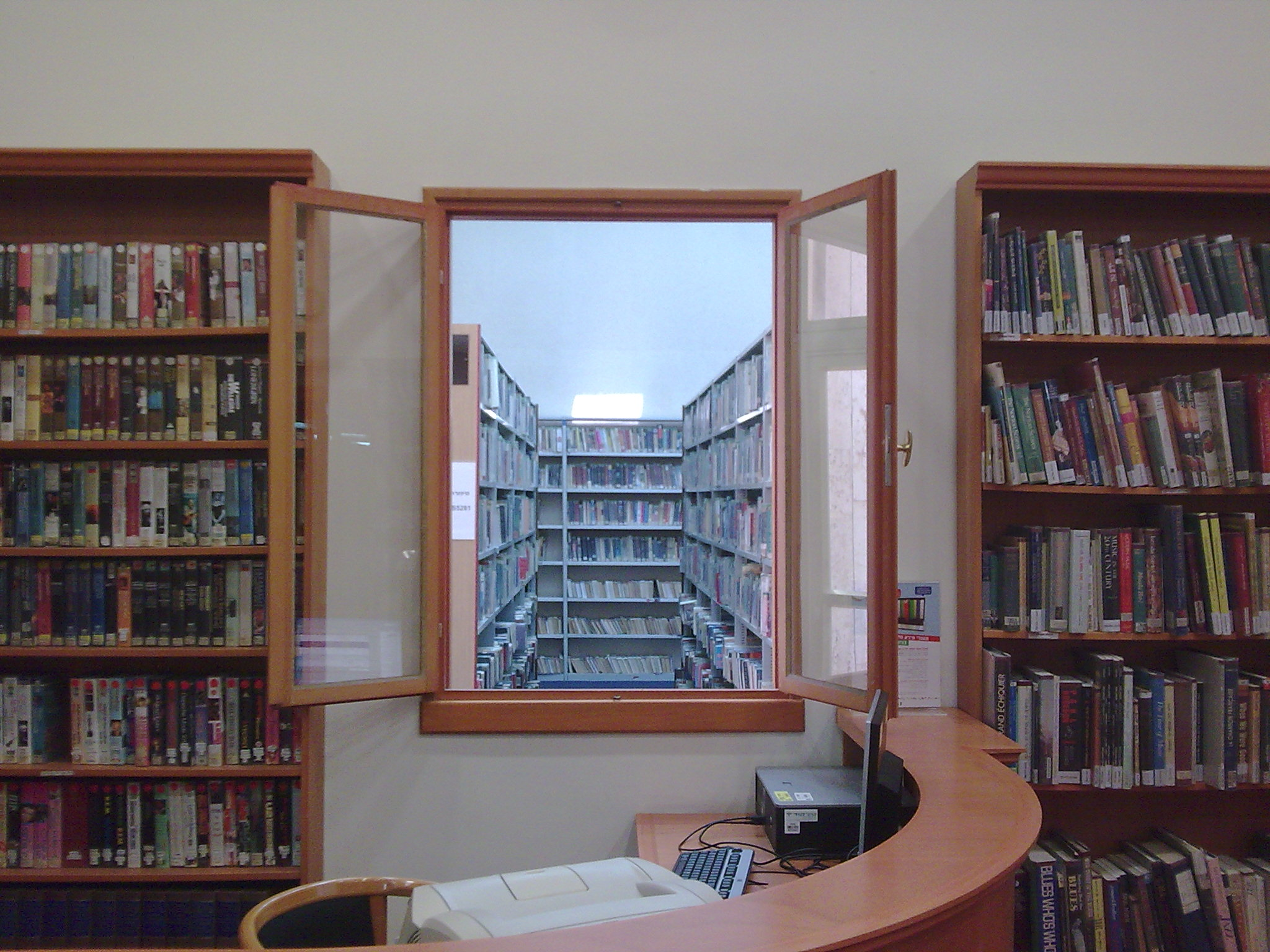
Music Library, (2013)

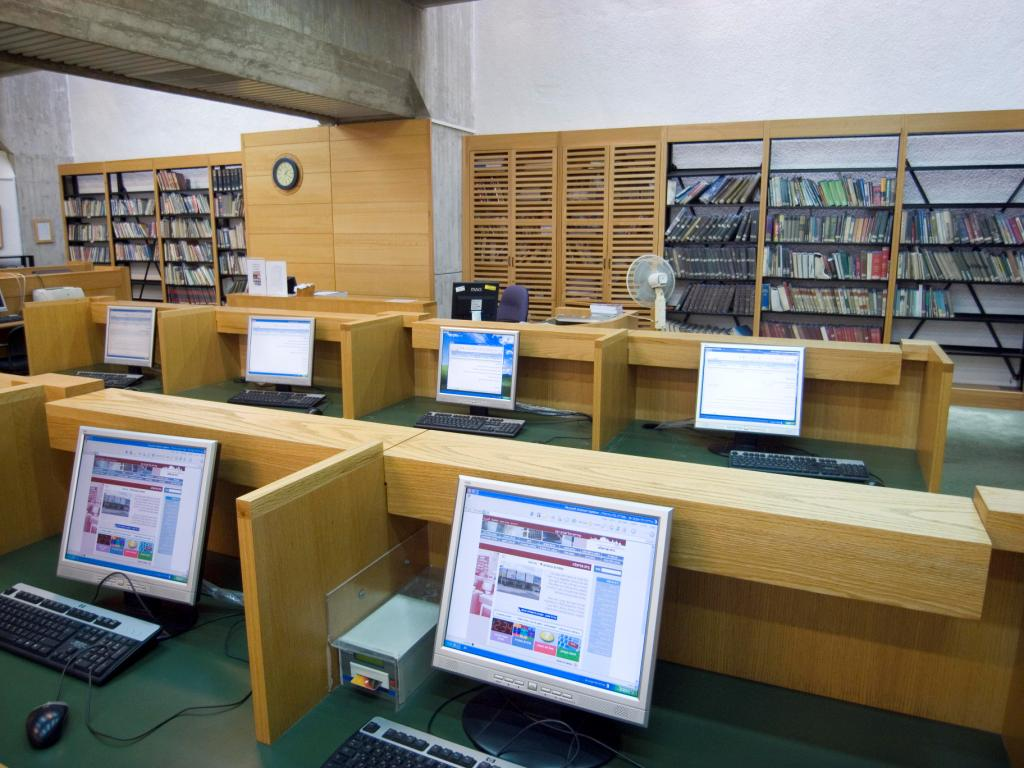
Information and Reference Library, (2013)

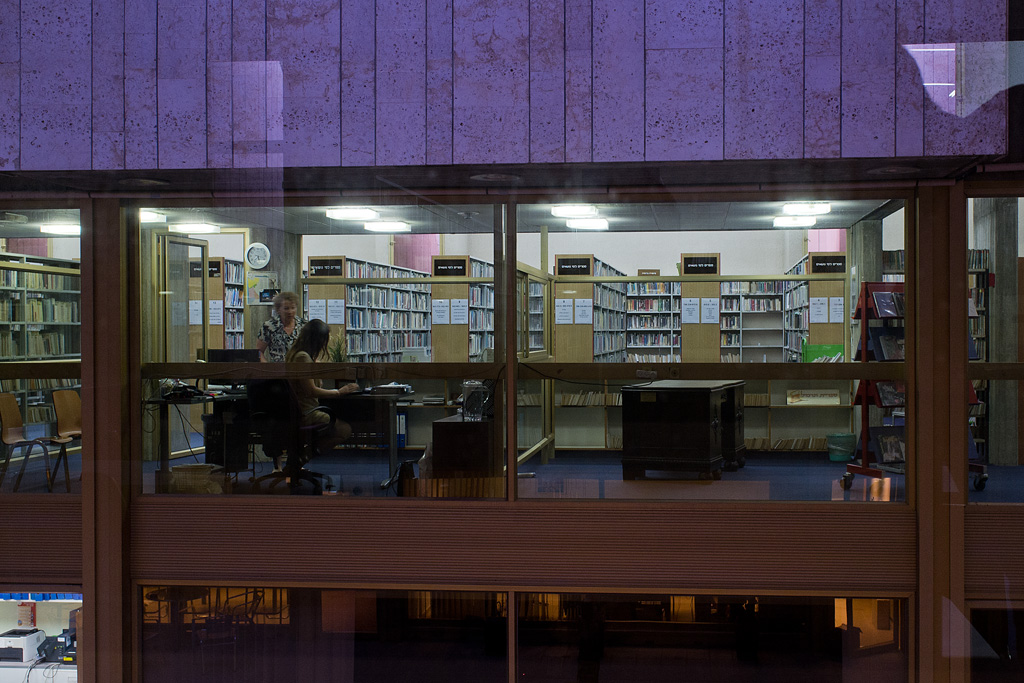
Lending Department, (2013)

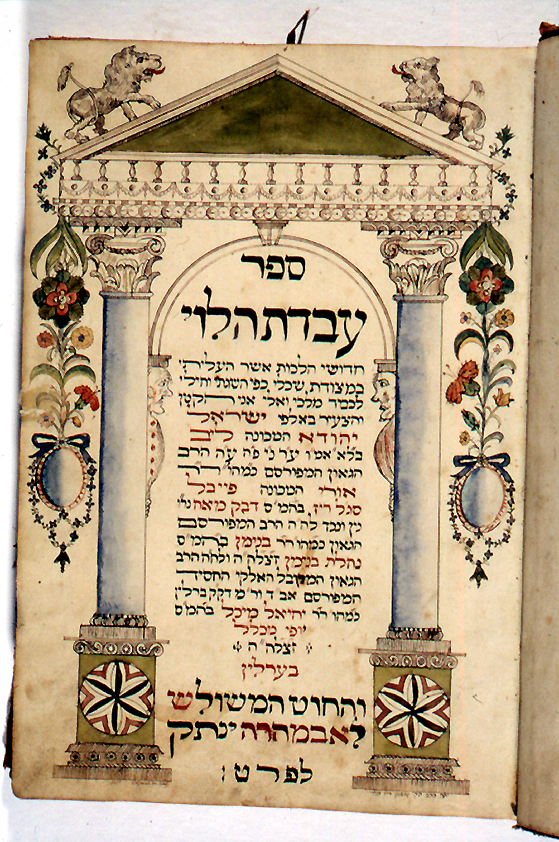
The book cover Avodat ha-Leṿi, (1546) from Rambam library

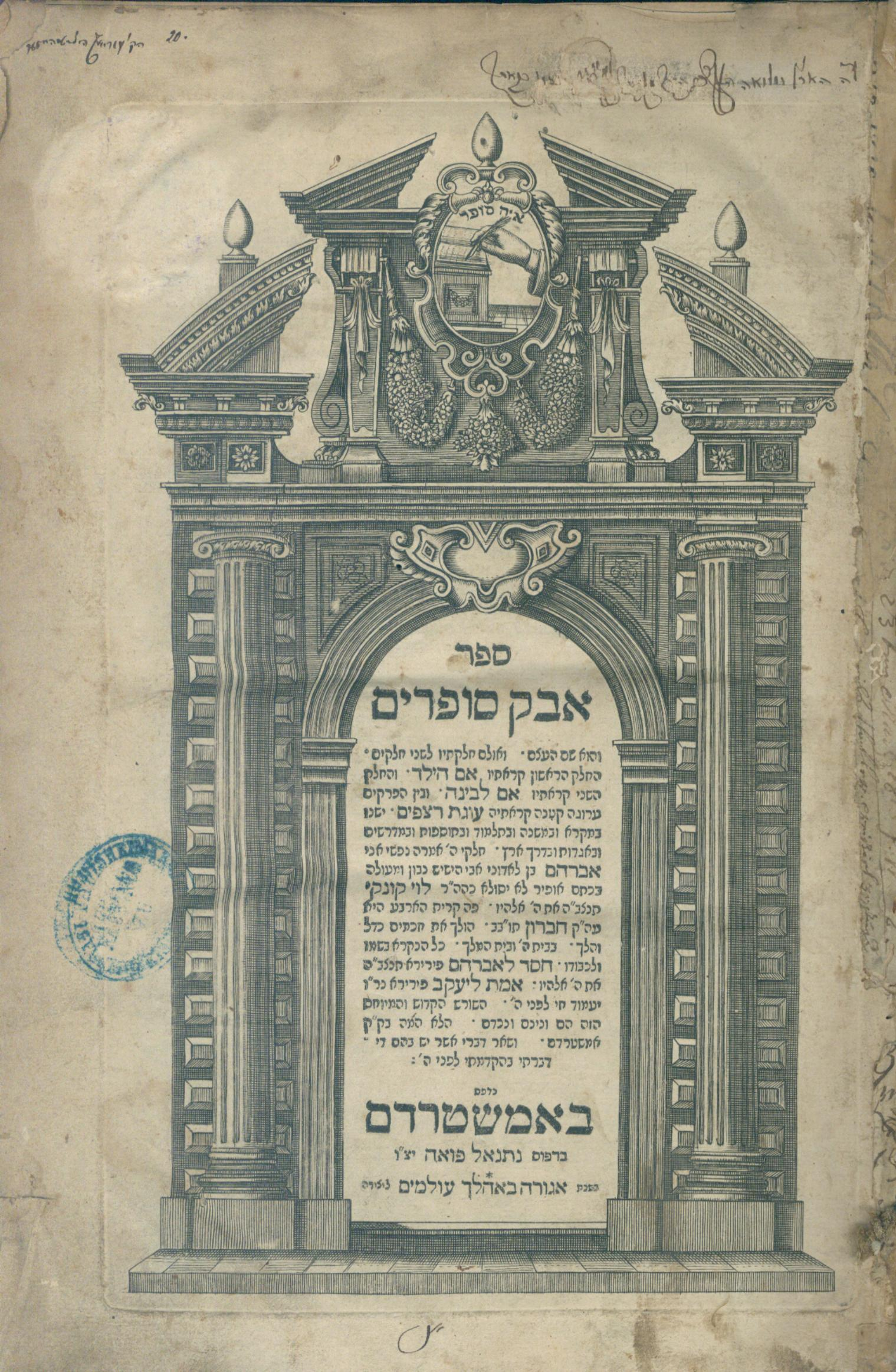
The cover of the book Avak Sofrim, (1704) from Rambam library

=== Special departments ===
- Periodicals Library – a collection of Hebrew press from the end of the 19th century and up to the present day. Most periodicals are also available on microfilm.
- Ahad Ha'am Library – holds rare and unique publications on education, the history of Israel, Diaspora communities, as well as Hebrew literature, books on arts, Passover Hagadas and a collection of publications with dedications.
- Rambam (Maimonides) Library – religious scientific library that provides about 100 thousand books and different computer databases.
- Design and Visual Information Library – collection of visual information on different subjects. The Collection contains more than half a million photos, pictures, postcards, reproductions, caricatures, leaflets, brochures, catalogs – which are subdivided into three categories: Personalities, Countries, and Themes.
- Israel Dance Archive and Library – the central library in Israel for storage of information on dance history. More than 2000 folders with archive documents, over 8000 books, as well as journals, video recordings and other media on the subject: "The history of Israeli and Foreign Dance" - from the beginning of the 20th century and up to today.
- Theatre Library – alongside a large number of plays, the Library contains the Theatre Archive, named after Yehuda Gabai. The archive is a large collection of documentary materials on the history of Israeli and Hebrew theatre. The archive comprises posters, programmes from performances, mock-ups of scenery, and personal archives of outstanding theatre figures.
