= Michael McDonnell =

British colonial administrator and judge

Chief Justice of the Supreme Court of Palestine
- In office 1927 – October 1936
- Preceded by: Thomas Haycraft
- Succeeded by: Harry Herbert Trusted

Personal details
- Born: Michael Francis Joseph McDonnell; 15 June 1882
- Died: 12 March 1956 (aged 73)
- Education: St Paul's School, London
- Alma mater: St John's College, Cambridge

Sir Michael Francis Joseph McDonnell CBE (15 June 1882 – 12 April 1956) was Chief Justice of Palestine between 1927 and 1936. He subsequently supported the Arab claim for Palestinian self-determination.

== Education ==
Born in London to an Irish Catholic family, McDonnell attended the public St Paul's School, London (he later wrote a history of the school and its illustrious alumni). He went on to read medicine and then law at St John's College, Cambridge, where he also served as president of the Cambridge Union Society.

== Support for Irish Home Rule ==
At the Cambridge Union Society, Michael and his older brother T.F.R. McDonnell championed the Irish Home Rule cause. Both were also adamant supporters of women's suffrage and admission to Cambridge.

In May 1903, McDonnell had opposed a Union motion moved by John Maynard Keynes: "that Home Rule for Ireland is beyond the sphere of practical politics". Keynes observed that while "there is no other member who can crush an illogical or ineffective speaker with such concentrated scorn as Mr McDonnell", against himself McDonnell had not been "at his best". Keynes's carried his motion by 57 votes to 51.

Four years later he published book addressing what he perceived as the ignorance of Irish affairs in England. A preface was supplied by the Irish Parliamentary leader, John Redmond.

== Colonial Service ==
After graduating from Cambridge McDonnell was called to the Bar at the Inner Temple. At that time he authored the book Ireland and the Home Rule Movement (1908), an attack on British policy in Ireland and a critique of Empire more broadly. McDonnell nevertheless went on to join the Colonial Service in 1911, serving in British West Africa for sixteen years. During his time in West Africa McDonnell served as Assistant District Commissioner in the Gold Coast, magistrate in The Gambia, and Attorney-General and Acting Chief Justice in Sierra Leone.

In 1927, McDonnell replaced Sir Thomas Haycraft as Chief Justice in the British Mandate of Palestine.

== Palestine and sympathy for the Arab cause ==
McDonnell was forced into early retirement – historian Matthew Hughes speaks of his being dismissed from office – in October 1936. This was towards the end of the first wave of the Arab Revolt, and he was replaced by Harry Herbert Trusted in January 1937. McDonnell's retirement was induced by a series of clashes with Palestine's High Commissioner, Sir Arthur Wauchope, over the role of Palestine's judiciary in suppressing the "disturbances". This clash culminated in McDonnell's ruling in the El Qasir v Attorney-General (1936) 3 PLR 121 case. The decision pertained to house demolitions scheduled to take place in the old city of Jaffa. Although McDonnell ruled that the government had the authority to demolish the houses, he deemed the government's reliance on town planning justifications, rather than military necessity, an act of moral cowardice and accused it of "throwing dust" in the public's eyes.

After retiring from the bench and returning to London, McDonnell took up advocacy on behalf of the Arab cause in Palestine: he published a number of articles in which he attacked Britain's pro-Zionist policy in Palestine and in 1939, he was an adviser to the Arab delegation concerning the 1915–1916 correspondence between Sir Henry McMahon and the Sharif Hussayn of Mecca. The delegation disputed the government's claim that McMahon's letters excluded the territory and people of Palestine from the British promise that Arab self-determination.
