= Zionist Commission =

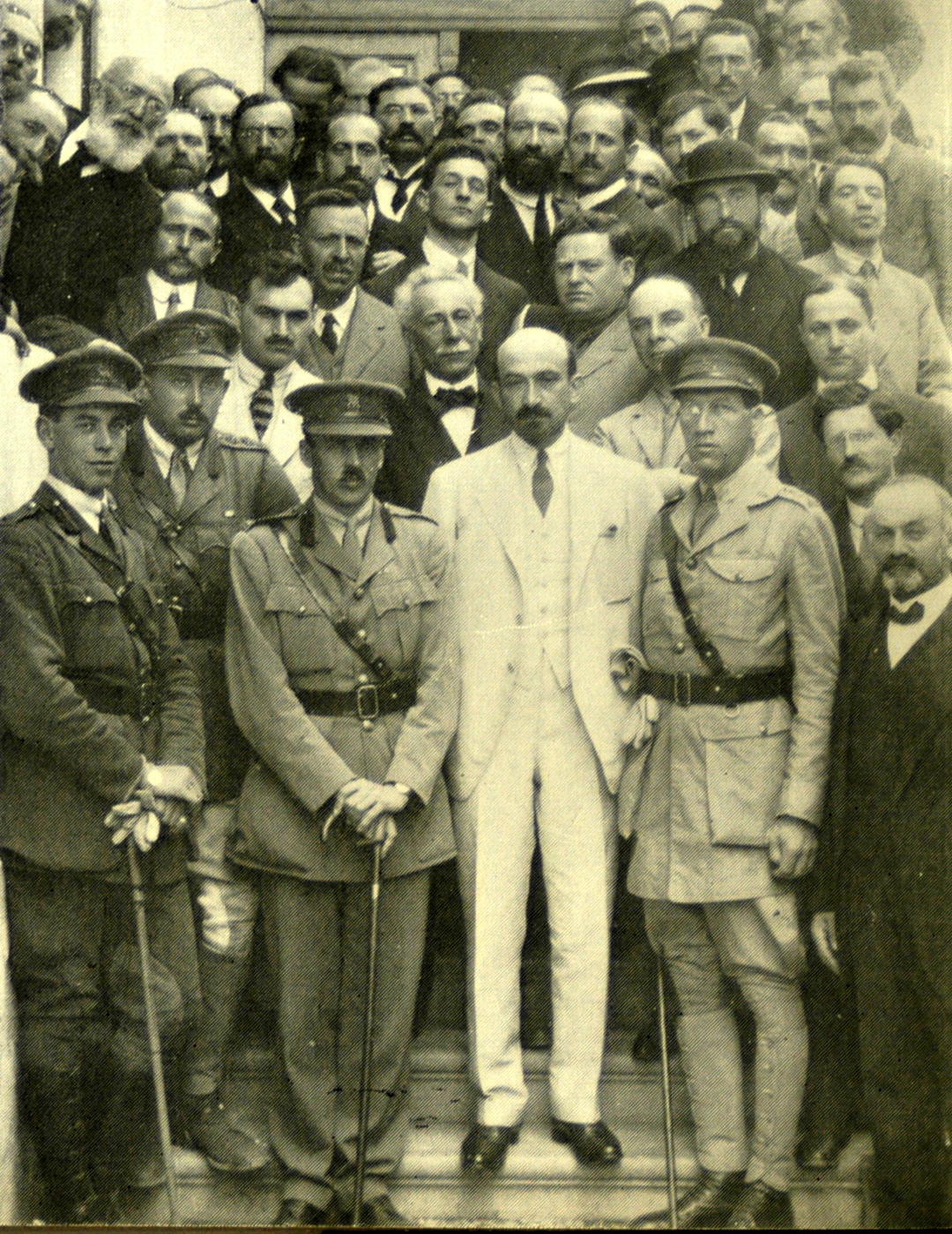
Chaim Weizmann and the Zionist Commission, 1918. Also pictured: Edwin Samuel, W.G.A. Ormsby-Gore, Israel Sieff, Leon Simon, James de Rothschild and Joseph Sprinzak.

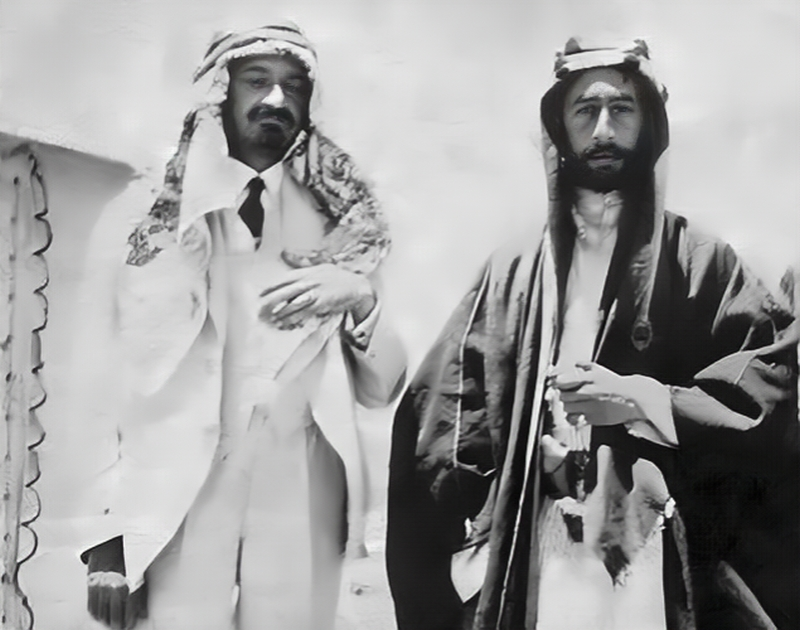
Emir Feisal I (right) and Chaim Weizmann (also wearing Arab dress as a sign of friendship) in Syria in 1918. At this time Feisal was living in Syria not Iraq.

Zionist Commission for Palestine was a commission chaired by Chaim Weizmann, president of the British Zionist Federation following British promulgation of the pro-Zionist, Balfour Declaration. The Commission was formed in March 1918 and went to Palestine to study conditions and submit recommendations to the British authorities.

== History ==
The Zionist Commission consisted of Weizmann with Israel Sieff as secretary, and Joseph Cowen, Dr. M. D. Eder, Leon Simon from Britain; Commandante Angelo Levi Bianchini from Italy; and Professor Sylvain Lévi from France. There were no representatives from America or Russia. With Weizmann's approval, William Ormsby-Gore served as British military liaison officer.

The Commission reached Palestine on 14 April 1918; it ran into difficulties with the British military administration (OETA), which was far from sympathetic to Zionist aspirations. The Commission had gone to Palestine with the consent of the British Government and stayed there for some years.

The Commission carried out initial surveys of Palestine and aided the repatriation of Jews sent into exile by the Ottoman Turks during World War I. It restructured the Palestine Office, previously founded by the Zionist Organization (ZO) in 1908, into small departments for agriculture, settlement, education, land, finance, immigration, and statistics. The Palestine Office was merged into the Zionist Commission.

In June 1918, representing the Zionist Commission, Weizmann traveled to southern Transjordan to meet Emir Feisal, during the British advance from the south against the Ottoman Empire in World War I. The intended purpose was to forge an agreement between Feisal and the Zionist movement to support an Arab Kingdom and Jewish settlement in Palestine, respectively. Neither side considered it necessary to consult the wishes of the Palestinian Arabs.

Arab opposition to establishing a national home for the Jewish people in Palestine was voiced by the newly formed Muslim-Christian Associations and the Palestine Arab Congress. On 19 April 1920, elections were held for the Assembly of Representatives of the Palestinian Jewish community. The Palin Report 1920 on the April riots, submitted in August 1920, though never published, was critical of both sides. By the time the Report was presented, the British Occupied Enemy Territory Administration had been replaced by a High Commissioner, Sir Herbert Samuel. Weizmann became president of the Zionist Organization (ZO) in 1920. Also in 1920, Menachem Ussishkin (who had made aliyah to Palestine in 1919) was appointed head of the Zionist Commission.

Further rioting took place in Jaffa between 1 and 7 May 1921. In October 1921, the Haycraft Commission of Inquiry blamed the Arabs for the violence during the Jaffa riots, but identified a series of grievances concerning the way Arab interests were apparently being subsumed to the interests of Jewish immigrants, who were then around 10% of the population and increasing rapidly. Some measures to ease Arab unhappiness were taken, but Jewish communities were helped to arm themselves and ultimately the report was ignored.

In 1921, the Zionist Commission became the Palestine Zionist Executive, which was designated the Jewish Agency for the purpose of Article 4 of the Palestine Mandate, to advise the British mandate authorities on the development of the country in matters of Jewish interest. In 1929, the Palestine Zionist Executive officially became the Jewish Agency for Palestine at the 16th Zionist Congress, held in Zurich.

== See also ==
- World Zionist Organization
