= Avraham Moshe Bernstein =

Belarusian hazzan and composer (1866–1932)

Abraham Moshe Bernstein
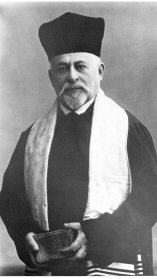
- Born: Abraham Moshe Bernstein; July 21, 1866; Shatsk, Belarus
- Died: June 16, 1932 (aged 65); Vilna, Lithuania
- Occupations: Chazan, Composer, and Educator

Abraham Moshe Bernstein (July 21, 1866 – June 16, 1932) was a Chazan and composer. In 1927, he released a compilation of Jewish folk tunes from Eastern Europe.

== Biography ==
Bernstein was born in 1866 in the town of Shatsk, located in what was then White Russia. In 1875, he moved to Minsk to pursue his studies at Yeshiva there. While there, Bernstein joined Israel Minsker's choir but noted, feeling out of place among the other choristers due to their coarse behavior.

Bernstein then moved to the Mir Yeshiva (Belarus), where he studied for two years. After his time in Mir, he traveled from town to town, eventually arriving in Kovno. There, he began studying under Kovner Chazan, Raphael Judah Rabinowitch, who became his mentor and close friend.

Bernstein died in 1932.
