= John Berry Haycraft =

British physiologist (1857–1922)

John Berry Haycraft FRSE
- Born: John Berry Haycraft; 15 March 1857; Lewes, East Sussex, England
- Died: 30 December 1922 (aged 65); Royston, Hertfordshire, England
- Education: University of Edinburgh

John Berry Haycraft FRSE (bapt. 15 March 1857 – 30 December 1922) was a British physician and professor in physiology who carried out important medical research.

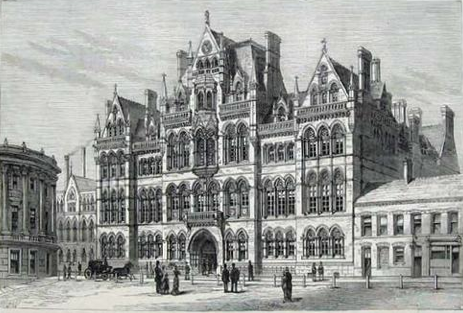
Mason College, now the University of Birmingham

== Biography ==
John Haycraft was born in Lewes, East Sussex, England, in 1857, the son of actuary John Berry Haycraft. His younger brother was Sir Thomas Haycraft, a judge in the British Colonial Service.

He received his medical education at the University of Edinburgh, where he gained an MD on the history, development, and function of the carapace of the chelonia and also a DSc in public health in 1888. He worked for a time in Ludwig's laboratory in Leipzig.

In 1880, he was elected a Fellow of the Royal Society of Edinburgh. His proposers were Peter Guthrie Tait, William Rutherford, Sir William Turner, and Sir Thomas Richard Fraser.

In 1881, he was appointed chair of physiology at Mason College (which later became the University of Birmingham). He taught in Birmingham and attracted many students to the city. During his years in Birmingham and Edinburgh, Haycraft had been actively engaged in research and published papers on the coagulation of blood and in 1884, he discovered that the leech secreted a powerful anticoagulant, which he named hirudin, although it was not isolated until the 1950s, nor its structure fully determined until 1976.

Haycraft returned to London in 1892 and was appointed a research scholar of the British Medical Association.

In 1893, he was appointed chair of physiology at University College, Cardiff, where he worked until retirement in 1920. Haycraft died three years later.

He died in Royston, Hertfordshire on 30 December 1922.

He married Lily Charlotte Isabel Lillie Stacpoole, sister of Henry De Vere Stacpoole. John Stacpoole Haycraft was his grandson.

== Books and articles published ==
- "Upon the Cause of the Striation of Voluntary Muscular Tissue", Proceedings of the Royal Society of London (1854-1905). 1 January 1880, 31:360–379
- "A New Hypothesis concerning Vision", Proceedings of the Royal Society of London (1854-1905). 1 January 1893, 54:272–274
- "On the Action of a Secretion Obtained from the Medicinal Leech on the Coagulation of the Blood", Proceedings of the Royal Society of London (1854-1905), 1 January 1883, 36:478–487
- Darwinism and Race Progress, London: Scribner, 1895. (Previously published in The Lancet.)
- The Human Body. A Physiology Reader for Schools, London: Thomas Nelson & Sons, 1902.
