= Shatsk, Belarus =

Shatsk Шацк
- Agrotown
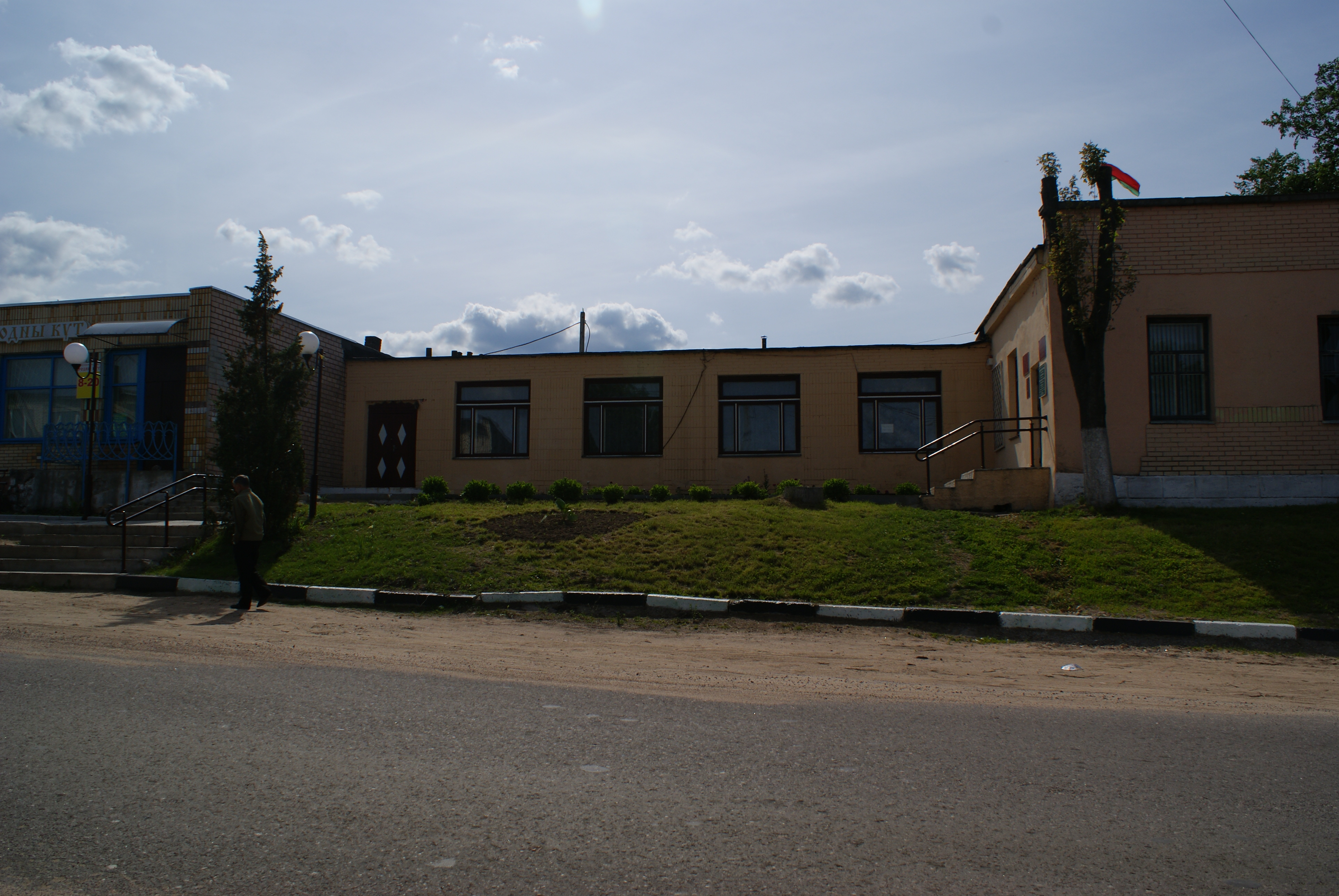
- Library in Shatsk

- Location within Belarus
- Coordinates: 53°26′N 27°42′E
- Country: Belarus
- Region: Minsk Region
- District: Pukhavichy District
- Founded: 1492
- Agrotown since: 2010

Population (2012)
  - Total: 667
- Time zone: UTC+3 (MSK)
- Area code: +375 1713

Shatsk (Belarusian: Шацк, romanized: Šack; Russian: Шацк) is an agrotown in Pukhavichy District, Minsk Region, Belarus. It serves as the administrative center of Shatsk selsoviet. As of 2012, its population was 667. It is located 68 kilometres (42 mi) south of Minsk.
