= Haycraft Commission =

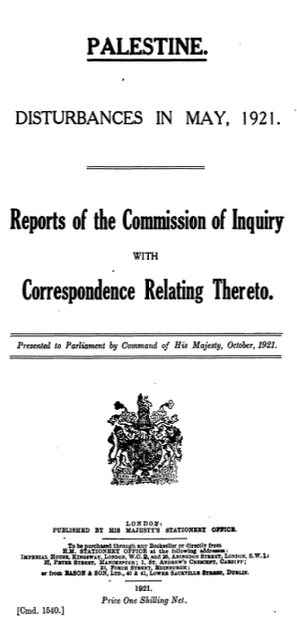
Haycraft Commission of Inquiry, Cmd 1540

The Haycraft Commission of Inquiry was a Royal Commission set up to investigate the Jaffa riots of 1921, but its remit was widened and its report entitled "Palestine: Disturbances in May 1921". The report blamed the Arabs for the violence, but identified a series of grievances concerning the way their interests were apparently being subsumed to the interests of the Jewish immigrants, who were then around 10% of the population and increasing rapidly. Some measures to ease Arab unhappiness were taken, but Jewish communities were helped to arm themselves and ultimately the report was ignored. Publishing it (unlike the Palin Report of the previous year) was considered a propitiatory measure.

== Commission operations ==
The commission was headed by Sir Thomas Haycraft, then the Chief Justice of the Supreme Court in Palestine with H. C. Luke, assistant governor of Jerusalem and J.N. Stubbs of the Legal Department as members. Muslims were represented by 'Aref Pasha al-Dajani, Christians by Ilyas Effendi Mushabbak and Jews by Dr. Mordechai Eliash. The report was published in October 1921.

== Background ==
The disturbances occurred during an interval after the military occupation of Palestine, under OETA administration, but before the League of Nations endorsement of British rule and the beginning of the British Mandate. Sir Herbert Samuel had been appointed High Commissioner but there was severe resentment, particularly the Arab majority, because he was known to be a Zionist. In the immediate aftermath of the riots, Samuel could not travel without armoured cars and had been forced to promise a national government.

== Conclusions ==
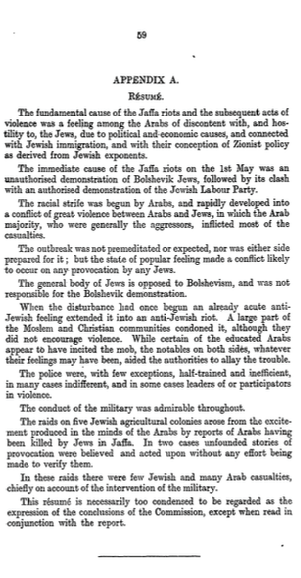
The Summary Conclusions of the report

The report noted that the violence by Arabs on the Jews was apparently triggered by a clash between the MPS (Miflagah Po'alim Sotzialistim) or Bolsheviks and the authorized Jewish Labour Party but that this "could not have been sufficient to give rise to more than a street riot of the ordinary kind".

In the summary of the report the grievances of the Arabs were listed as follows:

1. The British in Palestine, now led by a Zionist, had adopted "a policy mainly directed towards the establishment of a National Home for the Jews, and not to the equal benefit of all Palestinians".
2. An official advisory body to the government in Palestine, the Zionist Commission, placed the interests of the Jews above all others.
3. There was an undue proportion of Jews in the government.
4. Part of the Zionist program was to flood the country with people who possessed "greater commercial and organizing ability" which would eventually lead to their gaining the upper hand over the rest of the population.
5. The immigrants were an "economic danger" to the country because of their competition, and because they were favored in this competition.
6. Immigrants offended the Arabs "by their arrogance and by their contempt of Arab social prejudices".
7. Owing to insufficient precautions, Bolshevik immigrants were allowed into the country leading to social and economic unrest in Palestine.

Some Jews claimed to the Commission that the cause of the trouble was propaganda from a small class of Ottoman supporting Arabs who regretted the departure of the old regime. The British "had put an end to privileges and opportunities of profit formerly enjoyed by them". However, the commission was satisfied that this was not the case and that the feeling against the Jews was "too genuine, too widespread, and too intense to be accounted for in the above superficial level". Any anti-British feeling by Arabs had arisen because of their association with the furtherance of the policy of Zionism.

The report made clear that the "racial strife was begun by the Arabs" and that the "Arab majority, who were generally the aggressors, inflicted most of the casualties." "The [Arab] police were, with few exceptions, half-trained and inefficient, in many cases indifferent, and in some cases leaders or participators in violence" and, while a large part of the Moslem and Christian communities condoned the riots, "they did not encourage violence. While certain of the educated Arabs appear to have incited the mob, the notables on both sides, whatever their feelings may have been, aided the authorities to allay the trouble."

Five Jewish agricultural colonies had been attacked, but "in these raids there were few Jewish and many Arab casualties, chiefly on account of the intervention of the military."

The commission added that: "We have been assured, and we believe, that had there been no Jewish question, the Government would have had no political difficulty of any importance to deal with so far as its domestic affairs were concerned". There was "no evidence worth considering" that the Jaffa riots were planned; "had that been the case, we hesitate to conjecture what the consequences would have been". As long as the Jews remained an "unobtrusive minority" as they did under the Turks, they were not "molested or disliked"; it was only when the Arabs came to believe that they were exercising a "preponderating influence over the Government" that a state of feeling emerged which required "but a minor provocation on the part of a small number of undesirable Jews to ignite an explosion of popular anger against Jews in general".

The report noted that: "Moslems, Orthodox Christians, Catholics, Maronites and other Uniates, Anglicans have been represented by witnesses, who included priests of the above Christian bodies: and it has been impossible to avoid the conclusions that practically the whole of the non-Jewish population was united in hostility to Jews".

Dr David Eder, head of the Zionist Commission, had addressed the committee and stated that only Jews should be allowed to bear arms, and that "there can only be one National Home in Palestine, and that a Jewish one, and no equality in the partnership between Jews and Arabs, but a Jewish preponderance as soon as the numbers of the race are sufficiently increased."

== Results ==
Samuel immediately initiated a scheme for the defense of Jewish settlements. An allotment of brassards and rifles, with proportionate quantity of ammunition, was made to each colony. While in theory these arms were bonded, in practice their distribution legitimised the earlier and illegal formation of the Haganah. Arab education had been a major grievance, since much better opportunities had been available under the Turks. In the event, improvements were made but the money ran out after a year. In December 1921 Samuel claimed to have solved the problem of the Beisan land in favour of its Arab tenants.

On the King's Birthday, 3 June 1921, Samuel made the first official interpretation of the Balfour Declaration, assuring the Arabs that immigration would be controlled according to the "economic absorptive capacity" of the country - and in fact suspended immigration, though only temporarily. He hastened the establishment of the Supreme Muslim Council, while restricting its powers exclusively to religious matters.

Perhaps most significantly, it was proposed that the anomalous position of the Zionist Organisation should be abolished and the country governed with the help of a body that represented all sections of the community. These proposals by Samuel caused significant unhappiness amongst the Zionists, such that Chaim Weizmann suggested to George Macdonogh, director of military intelligence (1916–18) and a pro-Zionist sympathizer, that Samuel be replaced as high commissioner. Meanwhile, the Arabs demanded the removal of Samuel and another Zionist, Mr Bentwich, his legal adviser. The Arabs felt that they were "the victims of Zionist coercion of the Government, which they most thoroughly distrust", and that "nothing short of a modification of the Jewish policy and the establishment of some form of proportional representation will ease the situation".

In his 'Political Report' for June 1921, Samuel reported the details of his new scheme to the colonial secretary Winston Churchill. He wrote that, since his speech of 3 June, the Jewish population had been "very nervous and apprehensive" and considered the speech a "severe set-back" to their aspirations. He maintained, however, that this feeling had been "a good deal modified" since Jewish colonies had been "provided with arms (under conditions strictly limiting their use to self-defence)".

There was another outburst of violence on 2 November 1921, the fourth anniversary of the Balfour Declaration. Private correspondence within the Colonial Office suggested that the Zionist Commission was making it appear that His Majesty's Government "was bound hand and foot to the Zionists, that the statement of the 3rd June was mere dust thrown in their eyes, and all Legislation here was, and would continue to be inspired by Zionist interest."

== See also ==
- Zionism
- Anti-Zionism
- Timeline of Zionism
- 1920 Palestine riots

== Bibliography ==
- Haycraft Commission of Inquiry
- Huneidi, Sahar A Broken Trust, Herbert Samuel, Zionism and the Palestinians. 2001
- Wasserstein, Bernard The British in Palestine: The Mandatory Government and the Arab-Jewish Conflict, 1917–1929. 2nd edition, Oxford 1991.
