= James Haycraft =

English cricketer

James Samuel Haycraft (11 September 1865 – 26 March 1942) was an English first-class cricketer active 1885 who played for Middlesex. He was born in Islington; died in St Pancras, London.
