= International House World Organisation =

International House World Organisation is a worldwide network of 160 language schools and teacher training institutes in more than 50 countries.

International House was founded in 1953 by John Haycraft and his wife Brita Haycraft in Cordoba (Spain), to provide an innovative approach to language teaching. At that time formal programmes of training for teachers of English as a Foreign Language were almost non-existent.

John Haycraft was the first to introduce formalised teacher training in 1962, and the course International House developed in the 1960s and 1970s became first the Royal Society of Arts Certificate in teaching English, and then the current CELTA training course organised by Cambridge ESOL.

Teaching at International House schools broadly follows what is often called the "communicative method", which focuses on student to student interaction as opposed to the teacher-centred approach of traditional language teaching. However, since the mid-nineties, this has been augmented into what is called 'principled eclecticism' to incorporate lexical, task-based and generally more 'function-based' approaches to language learning and teaching.

In 2025, International House was designated as an 'undesirable organization' in Russia.

== The International House affiliate network ==
All International House schools are independently owned affiliates which share the same philosophy, branding and many resources. All affiliates are regularly inspected by International House World Organisation approved inspectors for quality control purposes. Administration and control of the Organisation is maintained through a Board of Directors, an Executive Director and a Chief Operations Officer and staff.

The International House World Organisation also arranges annual academic and management conferences for affiliate Teachers and Directors.

International House also has the Online Teacher Training Institute (OTTI) offering teacher development by distance study. These courses are assessed by the International House Assessment Unit.
