= Ahad Ha'am =

Hebrew-language essayist, poet, and critic of early Zionism (1856-1927)

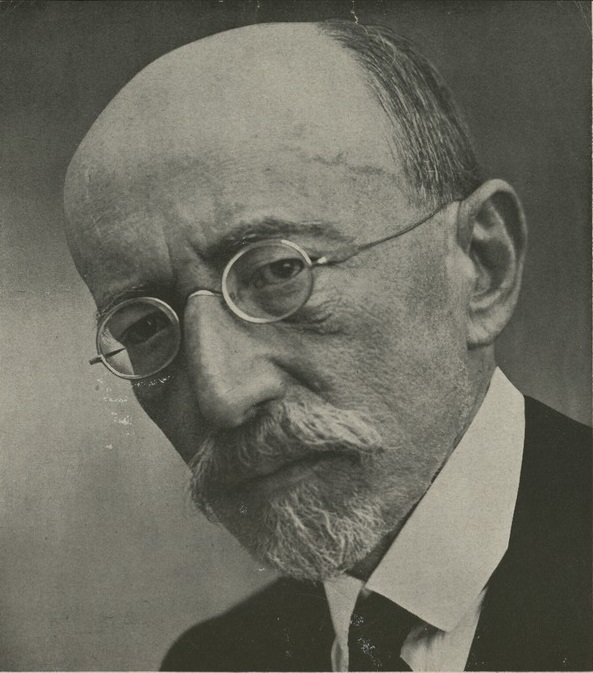
- Born: Asher Zvi Hirsch Ginsberg; 18 August 1856; Skvyra, Kiev Governorate, Russian Empire (now Skvyra, Kyiv Oblast, Ukraine)
- Died: 2 January 1927 (aged 70); Tel Aviv, Mandatory Palestine
- Occupations: Essayist, journalist
- Spouse: Rivke Schneersohn
- Writing career
- Movement: Hovevei Zion

Asher Zvi Hirsch Ginsberg (18 August 1856 – 2 January 1927), primarily known by his Hebrew name and pen name Ahad Ha'am (Hebrew: אַחַד הָעָם, lit. 'one of the people', Genesis 26:10), was a Hebrew journalist and essayist, and one of the foremost pre-state Zionist thinkers. He is known as the founder of cultural Zionism. With his vision of a Jewish "spiritual center" in Eretz Israel, his views regarding the purpose of a Jewish state contrasted with those of prominent figures within the Zionist movement such as Theodor Herzl, the founder of political Zionism. Unlike Herzl, Ahad Ha'am strived for "a Jewish state and not merely a state of Jews".

In his 1889 article Lo Zeh ha-Derekh ("The Wrong Way"), Ahad Ha'am argued that educational work should precede immediate and indiscriminate Jewish settlement in the land of Israel. He subsequently became the spiritual leader of the secret order Benei Moshe ("sons of Moses") and editor of the monthly literary periodical Ha-Shiloʾah ("The Coming One"), which contributed to the development of modern Hebrew literature.

Although Ahad Ha'am played a role in obtaining the Balfour Declaration, he favoured collective or group action over diplomatic negotiation, expressing the view that "Israel's salvation will be achieved by prophets, not by diplomats". He was also conscious of the question of Arab rights and observed on one occasion, "I am very careful in the choice of my enemies". His thought exercised a lasting influence on Zionist thinking both in Israel and throughout the Jewish diaspora.

== Biography ==
Ginsberg was born in Skvyra, in the Kiev Governorate of the Russian Empire (present-day Ukraine) to wealthy Hasidic parents. The town was located in the Pale of Settlement, which constituted an area in the Russian Empire in which Jews were legally allowed to reside. Ginsberg felt little affection for the town, describing it as "one of the most benighted spots in the Hasidic districts of Russia." Jewish segregation in the Russian Empire as well as his strong Orthodox upbringing served to cultivate an identity fundamentally based in Jewish Nationalism. At eight years old, he began to teach himself to read Russian. His father, Isaiah, sent him to heder until he was 12. When his father became the administrator of a large estate in the village of Gopitshitza in the Kiev Governorate, he moved the family there and took private tutors for his son, who excelled at his studies.

From a young age, Ginsberg was interested in the Haskalah movement. He was critical of the dogmatic nature of Orthodox Judaism, and began to distance himself from Orthodoxy by the time he was 16. Still, he remained loyal to his cultural heritage, especially the ethical ideals of Judaism. Ginsberg felt uncomfortable with taking the identity of misnaged (non-Hasidic Orthodox Jew) or maskil (Jewish Enlightener), so he simply referred to himself as "Ohev Yisrael", or "Lover of Israel". He married his wife Rivke at the age of 17. They had three children, Shlomo, Leah, and Rachel. In 1886 he settled in Odessa with his parents, wife and children, and entered the family business. In 1908, following a trip to Palestine, Ginsberg moved to London to manage the office of the Wissotzky Tea company. He settled in Tel Aviv in early 1922, where he served as a member of the Executive Committee of the city council until 1926. Plagued by ill health, Ginsberg died there in 1927.

== Education ==
=== Childhood education ===
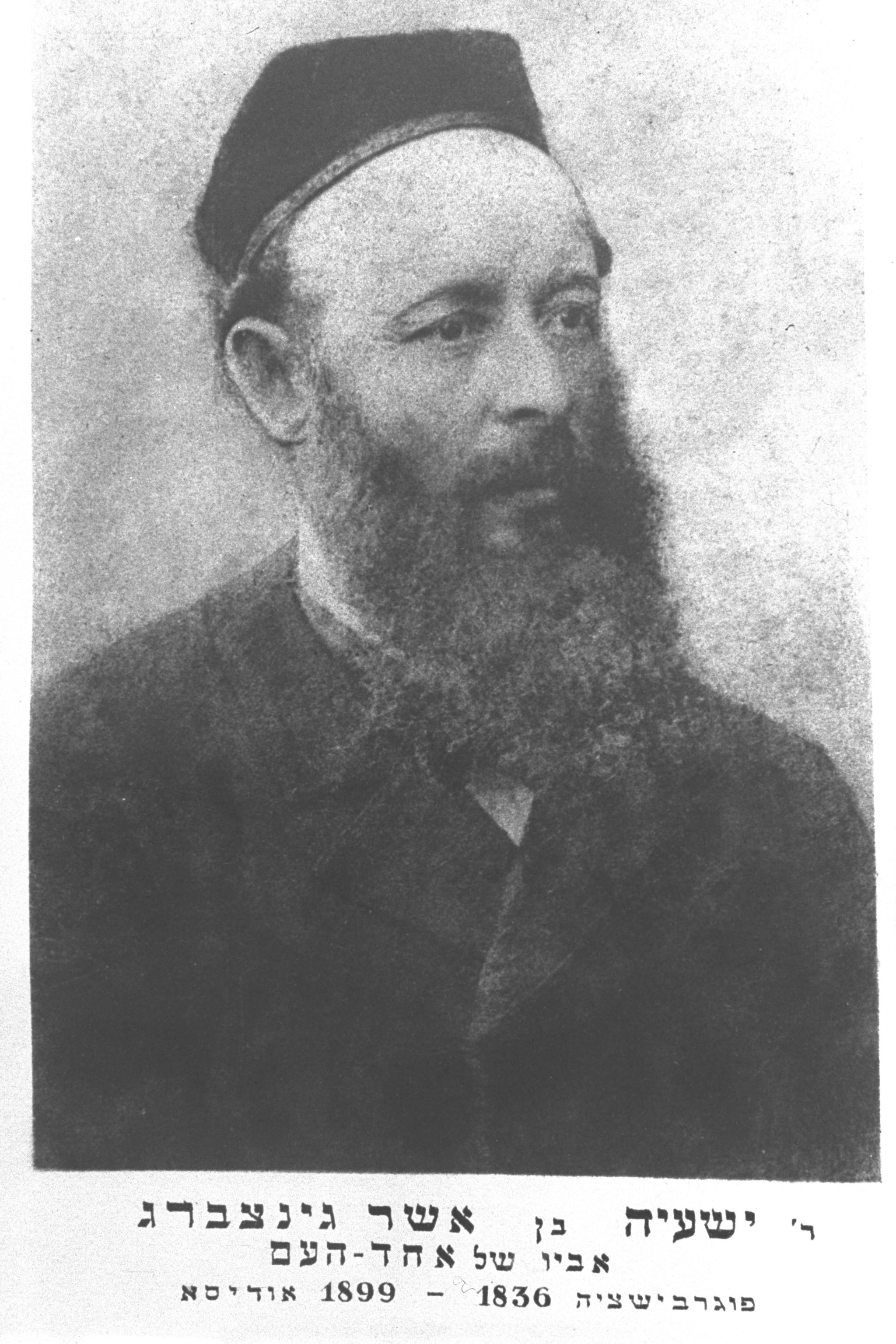
Ginsberg's father, Isaiah (Yeshaya) Ginsberg

Ginsberg's childhood education was fundamentally steeped in Orthodox Judaism. At the age of 3, he was sent to Heder. He had a desire to learn the Russian alphabet, but had to do so in secret as his family forbade instruction in languages other than Hebrew; according to Ginsberg, "my mother's father had with his own ears heard one of the great tsaddikim [Hasidic leaders] say that the sight of a foreign letter made the eyes unclean." Still, he was able to persuade some of his classmates to teach him the letters of the Russian alphabet. From a young age, Ginsberg displayed intellectual independence from the doctrine of Hasidism. He attempted to further his knowledge of Russian by reading street signs on his way home from Heder. His learning of Russian was exposed, however, when he returned home late, and his habit was subsequently banned. Ginsberg was also interested in algebra and geometry and began to teach himself the subjects using a book he found in his father's study. His pursuit was cut short again, though, when his grandmother told his parents he was practicing witchcraft after witnessing algebraic formulae written on the windows of the family's home.

=== Teen years and early adulthood ===
After moving the family to Gopitshitza, Ginsberg's father took tutors for his son. Asher excelled in the study of the Talmud, which contributed heavily to his affinity for the moral, ethical, and mystical teachings of Judaism. Additionally, his aptitude for Talmudic learning gave hope to his father that Ginsburg would become a rabbi. His hopes were diminished, however, as Asher broke away from Hasidism around the time of the family's move to Gopitshitza. Although he displayed obvious intelligence, Ginsberg's father forbade him from attending high school, which would later complicate his attempts to enroll in a university. Ginsberg displayed an interest in literature outside of Hasidism, particularly medieval Jewish works, the Bible, and Haskalah literature. His father did not forbid his reading outside of Hasidism, but did limit it heavily.

In his late teens and early twenties, Ginsberg dedicated himself to the study of religion, as well as subjects outside of Judaism such as Russian and German. During his first visit to Odessa in 1878, he became acquainted with another young man staying in the same hotel as him. There, he was introduced to the literature of Russian philosopher Dmitry Pisarev, who inspired him greatly. He returned home with the goal of enrolling in a university, and resolved to master the subjects required in a high school curriculum. However, he found that he had little time or desire to master the "intrinsically unimportant details" that students were required to learn in order to pass their exams, and abandoned the idea of enrolling at a Russian university. His subsequent attempts to attend university in Breslau, Berlin, Vienna and Leipzig faced various roadblocks, and his lack of higher education caused deep frustration. He experienced dissatisfaction with his lack of higher education, and this in part inspired his move to Odessa.

== Zionist activism ==
In his early thirties, Ginsberg returned to Odessa where he was influenced by Leon Pinsker, a leader of the Hovevei Zion (Lovers of Zion) movement whose goal was settlement of Jews in Palestine. Unlike Pinsker, Ginsberg did not believe in political Zionism, which he fought, 'with a vehemence and austerity which embittered that whole period'. Instead he hailed the spiritual value of the Hebrew renaissance to counter the debilitating fragmentation (hitpardut) in the diaspora, he believed that the ingathering of Jews in Palestine was not an answer. Kibbutz galuyot was a messianic ideal rather than a feasible contemporary project. The real answer lay in achieving a spiritual centre, or 'central domicile', within Palestine, that of Eretz Israel, which would form an exemplary model for the dispersed world of Jewry in exile to imitate; a spiritual focus for the circumferential world of the Jewish diaspora. He split from the Zionist movement after the First Zionist Congress, because he felt that Theodor Herzl's program was impractical. In an essay entitled The First Zionist Congress (1897), he supports:

"the emancipation of ourselves from the inner slavery and the spiritual degradation which assimilation has produced in us, and the strengthening of our national unity by joint action in every sphere of our national life, until we become capable and worthy of a life of dignity and freedom at some time in the future."

His criticism of political Zionism would give way to the development of his doctrine of cultural Zionism. From 1889 to 1906, Ginzberg flourished as a preeminent intellectual in Zionist politics.

== Journalism career ==
Ginsberg's literary career began after moving to Odessa in 1886, adopting the pen name "Ahad Ha'am". His first article was published in 1889. Ginsberg wrote a number of articles and essays during the late nineteenth and early twentieth centuries focused on the Jewish community and the direction of Zionism. He was mainly a proponent of a moderate movement focused on cultural Zionism in contrast to the practical Zionism he observed when visiting Palestine. Some of his famous essays include "Truth from Eretz Israel" and "Lo zu haderekh" (This is not the way).

He also founded the Hebrew monthly newspaper Ha-Shiloaḥ, a prominent Hebrew-language literary journal in the early twentieth century, and was chief editor from 1896 to 1902 before stepping down.

After his move to Tel Aviv in Palestine he published a 4-volume collection of his essays called Al Parashat Derakhim as well as a 6-volume collection of his edited letters.

=== Ha-Shiloah ===
With the collapse of his family business in 1896, Ginsberg had to turn to Hebrew literature to be his main source of income. He subsequently accepted a position as Director of the Ahiasaf Publishing Company, moving to Warsaw to be at the company's headquarters. Ginsberg had to help produce the company's annual almanac for 1896, but he soon switched focus to a more appealing project, a monthly Hebrew journal where he would take the role of chief editor.

Ginsberg named the publication Ha-Shiloah after a river in the Bible. The river in the Bible was known for water that goes softly, and he wanted his monthly to reflect the slow, methodical development of Hebrew literature he hoped his monthly would curate.

Ginsberg's desire for a respected Hebrew journal drove him to run the monthly with a high standard and tight control. His goal was to create a journal that was Judeocentric with the same quality of respected European journals at the time. To create this standard, prose and fictional writings were kept to separate sections, and had to maintain the theme of focus on the Jewish experience. Ginsberg's editorial style was also thorough and aggressive, often omitting entire pages of articles and restructuring whole essays where he deemed fit. Though the journal was respected by Western scholars, the sales were small and dwindled every year. Ginsberg eventually resigned in October 1902 when he predicted either the paper would be closed, or he would be fired.

Despite Ha-Shiloah's low sales, Ginsberg's strict curation and editorial style led to him being recognized as a key contributor in the development of a new, secular Hebrew essay writing style that is now known as the Odessa Style. This style is often described as being clear, succinct, positivist, and anti-romantic, and it almost entirely focuses on Jewish topics. As editor of Ha-Shiloah from 1896 until 1902, Ahad Ha'am established the Odessa Style as a benchmark for Hebrew writing.

== Visits to Palestine ==
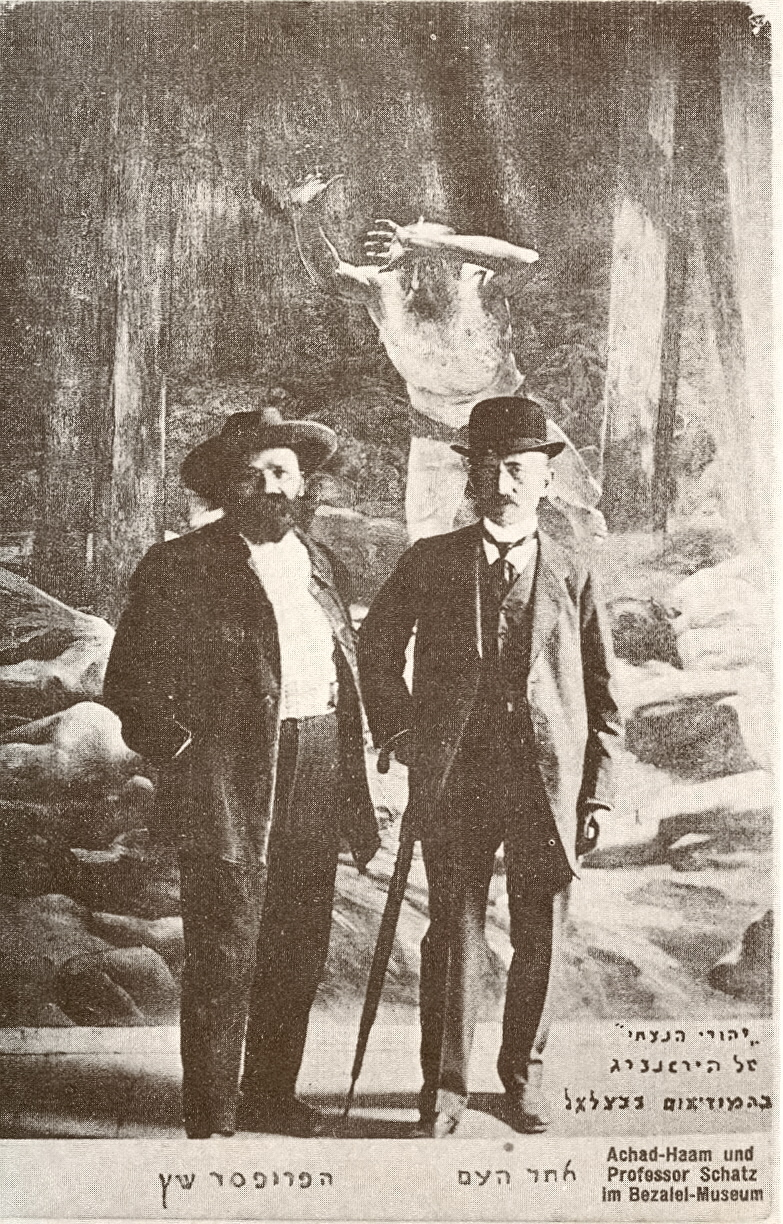
Ahad Ha'am with Bezalel Art School founder Boris Schatz against backdrop of "The Wandering Jew" by Samuel Hirszenberg

Asher Ginsberg travelled frequently to Palestine and published reports about the progress of Jewish settlement there. The essays were generally critical, focusing on the shortcomings of the movement. They reported on hunger, on Arab dissatisfaction and unrest, on unemployment, and on people leaving Palestine. In an essay soon after his 1891 journey to the area he warned against the 'great error', believing the movement was doomed to failure with resistance in land purchases, local attitudes, economic feasibility, and lack of nationalist motivation.

=== Truth from Eretz Israel ===
Asher Ginsberg first visited Palestine (the Ottoman Vilayet (province) of Beirut and the Sanjak (district) of Jerusalem) in 1891, to observe the progress of the First Aliyah, or the first wave of Jewish immigration to Palestine (1882-1903). When he returned home, he published a series of five essays in the St. Petersburg-based Hebrew paper Ha-Melitz entitled "Truth From Eretz Israel". The essays were a comprehensive critique of the immigration efforts from both logistical and ethical perspectives, presenting a somber report of future Jewish colonization efforts there.

"Truth from Eretz Israel" raised concerns about the Turkish government and native Arab population, both of whom would heavily resist the transformation of Palestine into a Jewish state. The essay also questioned the survival and prosperity of Jewish settlers currently in Palestine. The reliance on viticulture was unproven and currently unsustainable for Jewish farmers. This, along with inflated land prices, raised additional barriers to any goal of Zionism. Ahad Ha'am ultimately believed the Hovevei Zion movement would be a failure because the new villages were dependent on the largesse of outside benefactors, and the impoverished settlers of his day would struggle to build any Jewish homeland.

The series of essays is considered to be among the first works to seriously address the "Arab Issue" within the Zionist movement. Ahad Ha'am warned of future enmity between Arabs and Jews when relations would turn sour:

"From abroad we are accustomed to believing that the Arabs are all desert savages, like donkeys, who neither see nor understand what goes on around them. But this is a big mistake. The Arab, like all children of Shem, has a sharp intellect and is very cunning. The cities of Syria and Eretz Israel are full of Arab merchants who also know how to exploit the public and to proceed furtively with all those with whom they deal, exactly as in Europe. The Arabs, and especially those in the cities, understand our deeds and our desires in Eretz Israel, but they keep quiet and pretend not to understand, since they do not see our present activities as a threat to their future. Therefore they try to exploit us as well, to extract some benefit from the new visitors as long as they can. Yet they mock us in their hearts. The farmers are happy to have a new Hebrew colony founded in their midst since they receive a good wage for their labor and get wealthier from year to year, as experience shows; and the owners of large properties are also happy with us, since we pay them a huge price-more than they dreamed possible-for stony and sandy land. However, if the time comes when the life of our people in Eretz Israel develops to the point of encroaching upon the native population, they will not easily yield their place..."

He reported of the early Zionist settlers:

"They were slaves in their land of exile, and they suddenly find themselves with unlimited freedom, the kind of wild freedom to be found only in a country like Turkey. This sudden change has engendered in them an impulse to despotism, as always happens when "a slave becomes a king," and behold they walk with the Arabs in hostility and cruelty, unjustly encroaching on them, shamefully beating them for no good reason, and even bragging about what they do, and there is no one to stand in the breach and call a halt to this dangerous and despicable impulse. To be sure our people are correct in saying that the Arab respects only those who demonstrate strength and courage, but this is relevant only when he feels that his rival is acting justly; it is not the case if there is reason to think his rival's actions are oppressive and unjust."

Ahad Ha'am believed the solution was to bring Jews to Palestine gradually, while turning it into a cultural centre. At the same time, it was incumbent upon Zionism to inspire a revival of Jewish national life in the Diaspora. Only then would the Jewish people be strong enough to assume the mantle of building a nation state.

The series was criticized heavily within the Zionist movement, with many claiming that the essays provided a one-sided view of the Jewish national efforts, and others claiming that the series defamed Jewish settlers, both generally and specifically in Palestine. Asher Ginsberg's critiques of the Hovevei Zionists, an organization of which he was a member, cemented his reputation as an internal critic and moral compass for Zionism.

=== All in All ===
In 1912, after his third visit to Palestine, Ginsberg published the essay "All in All". In the essay, Ginsberg praised the achievements, economic growth, and independence of the Jewish settlers, contrary to his previous works.

== Importance of Hebrew and Jewish culture ==
Ahad Ha'am's ideas were popular at a very difficult time for Zionism, beginning after the failures of the first Aliya. His unique contribution was to emphasize the importance of reviving Hebrew and Jewish culture both in Palestine and throughout the Diaspora, something that was recognised only belatedly, when it became part of the Zionist program after 1898. Herzl did not have much use for Hebrew, and many wanted German to be the language of the Jewish state. Ahad Ha'am played an important role in the revival of the Hebrew language and Jewish culture, and in cementing a link between the proposed Jewish state and Hebrew culture.

== Cultural Zionism ==
The ideas perpetuated through Ginsberg's essays and criticisms regarding the Zionist movement constituted what is known today as Cultural Zionism. This ideology promoted cultural and linguistic revival throughout the Jewish diaspora, and allowed for, but did not require, the creation of a Jewish state which would serve as a cultural and spiritual center for the diaspora. Ginsberg and the ideology of cultural Zionism placed importance on issues plaguing Judaism as an identity rather than the problems of individual Jews.

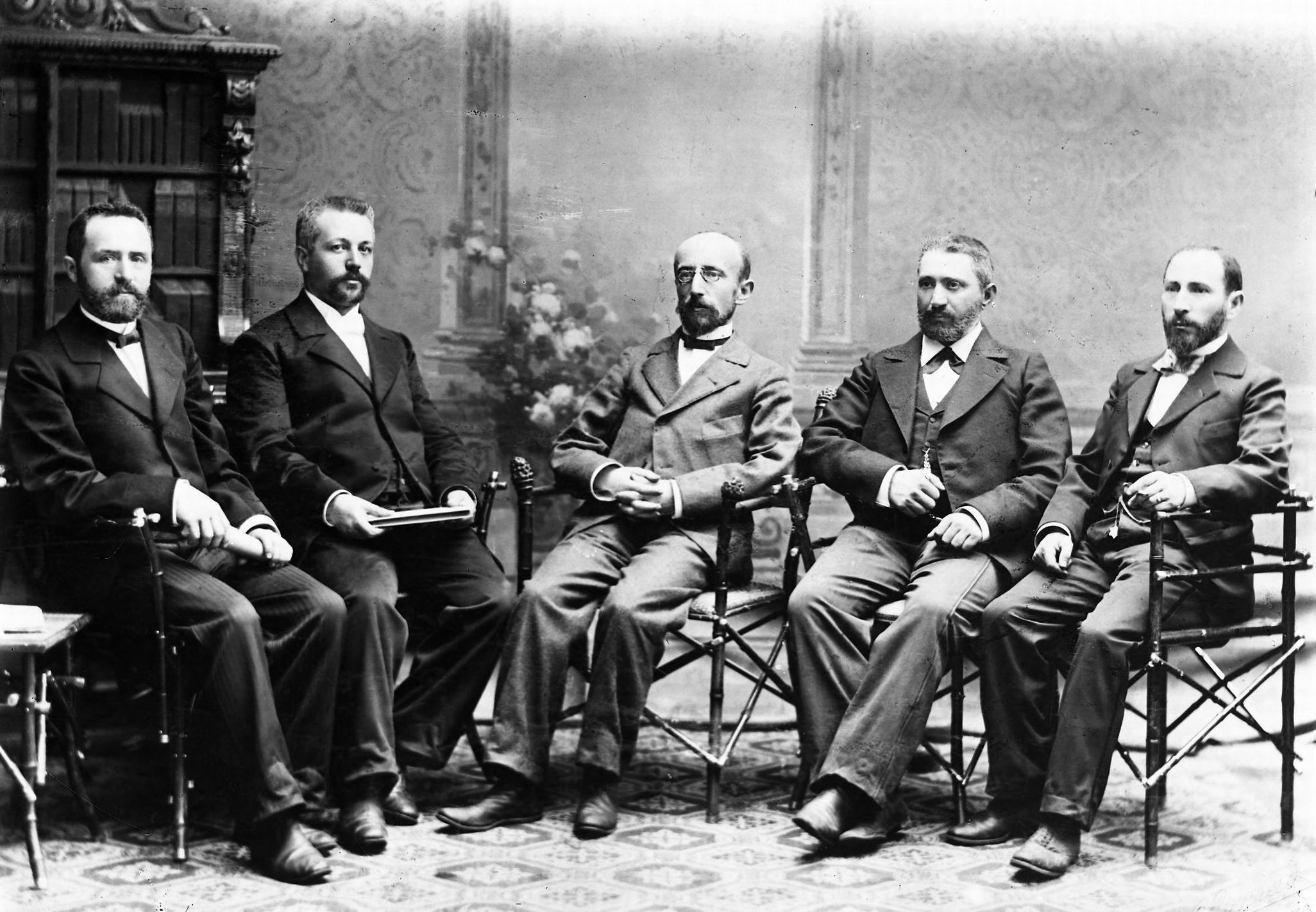
Ginsberg with members of B'nei Moshe

His first article criticizing practical Zionism, called "Lo zu haderekh" (This is not the way) published in 1888 appeared in HaMelitz. In it, he wrote that the Land of Israel will not be capable of absorbing all of the Jewish Diaspora, not even a majority of them. Ahad Ha'am also argued that establishing a "national home" in Zion will not solve the "Jewish problem"; furthermore, the physical conditions in Eretz Yisrael will discourage Aliyah, and thus Hibbat Zion must educate and strengthen Zionist values among the Jewish people enough that they will want to settle the land despite the greatest difficulties. The ideas in this article became the platform for Bnei Moshe (sons of Moses), a secret society he founded that year. Bnei Moshe, active until 1897, worked to improve Hebrew education, build up a wider audience for Hebrew literature, and assist the Jewish settlements. Perhaps more significant was Derekh Kehayim (1889), Ahad Ha'am's attempt to launch a unique movement from a fundamentalist perspective incorporating all the elements of a national revival, but driven by force of intellect.

He eclipsed nationalists like Peretz Smolenskin arguing assimilative individualism in the west further alienated Russified Jewry, who were seeking to reduce migration: isolating it beggared Eastern European Jewry. Even those in Hovevei seeking to restrict emigration would, he feared, bring the extinguishment of national consciousness; and atomisation of Jewish identity. Only anti-Semitism had made Jews of us. Derekh argued that nations had waxed and waned throughout history, but nationalism had all but vanished from Jewish consciousness. Only a small group of nobles kept it going.

Throughout the 1890s Ahad Ha'am worked to keep the flame of nationalism alive. Emphasis fell on moral concepts, honor of the flag, self-improvement, national revitalisation. A departure occurred in Avdut betokh herut discussing pessimism about the future for independent Jewishness. Critic Simon Dubnov alluded to this but was compromised by his westernised idealizing of French Jewry. For the movement, the preoccupation with assimilation at Odessa was fatal for Ahad Ha'am's progressive Zionism. The requirement arose in 1891 for a "spiritual centre" in Palestine; Bnei Moshe's implacable opposition to his support for Vladimir (Zeev) Tiomkin's ideal community at Jaffa compounded the controversy in Emet me'eretz Yisrael (The Truth from the Land of Israel).

In 1896, he became editor of Hashiloah, a Hebrew monthly, a position he held for six years. After stepping down as editor in 1903, he went back to the business world with the Wissotzky Tea Company.

In 1897, following the Basel Zionist Congress calling for a Jewish national home "recognized in international law" (völkerrechtlich), Ha'am wrote an article called Jewish State Jewish Problem ridiculing the idea of a völkerrechtlich recognized state, given the pitiful plight of the Jewish settlements in Palestine at the time. He emphasized that without a Jewish nationalist revival abroad, it would be impossible to mobilize genuine support for a Jewish national home. Even if the national home were created and recognized in international law, it would be weak and unsustainable.

In 1898, the Zionist Congress adopted the idea of disseminating Jewish culture in the Diaspora as a tool for furthering the goals of the Zionist movement and bringing about a revival of the Jewish people. Bnei Moshe helped to found Rehovot as a model for self-sufficiency, and established Achiasaf, a Hebrew publishing company.

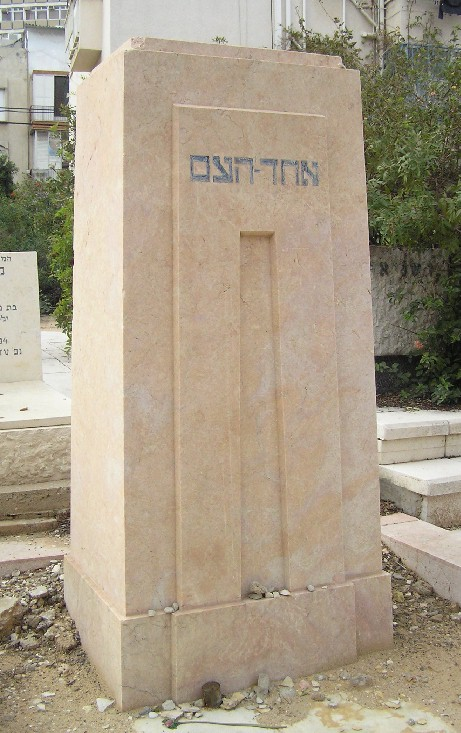
Grave of Ahad Ha'am, Trumpeldor Cemetery, Tel Aviv

== Political influence ==
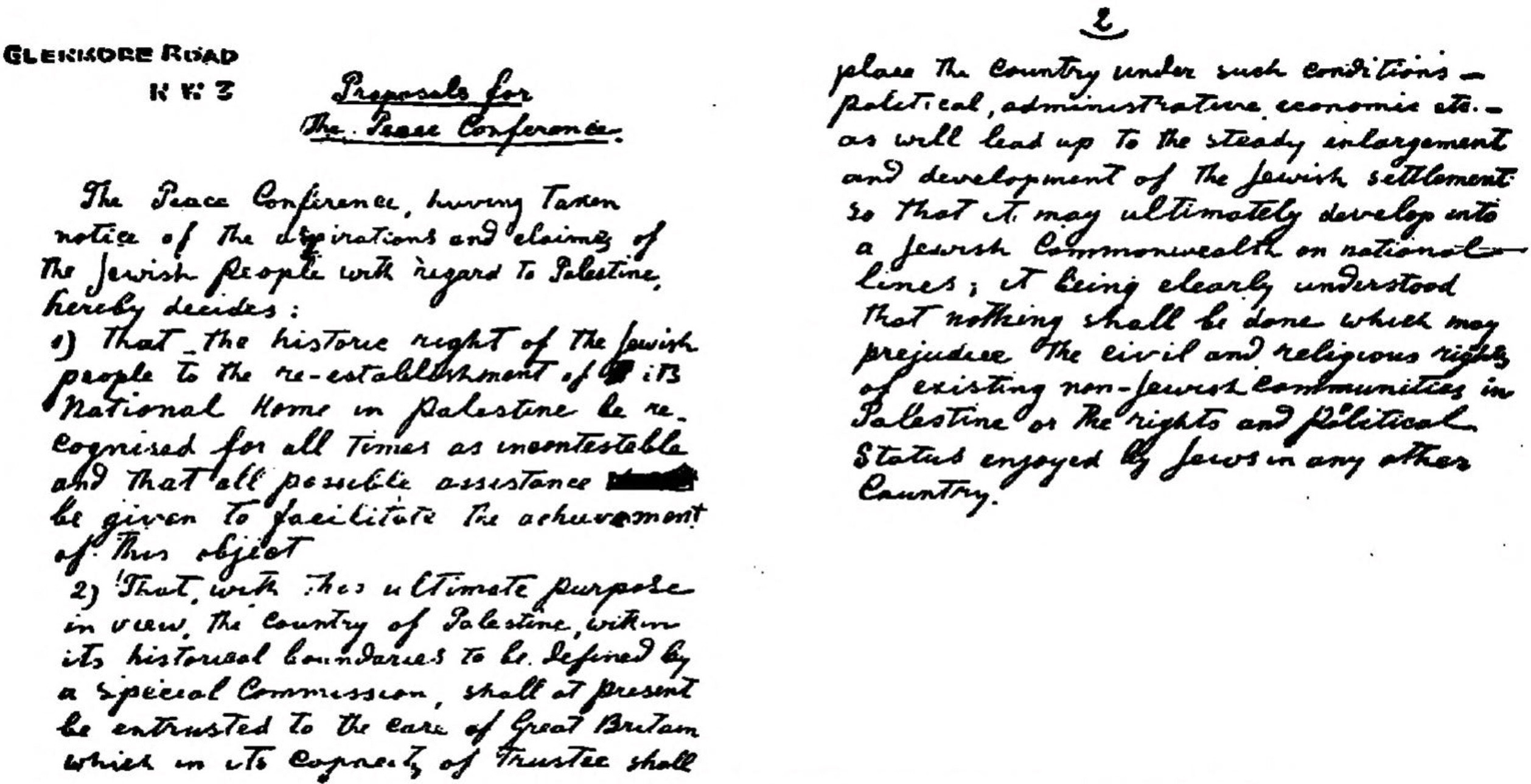
Ahad Ha'am's proposal to the Paris Peace Conference, 1919

Asher Ginsberg's political influence was relatively small when compared to the impact and proliferation of his published works. His desire to be seen as a neutral, apolitical commentator led to him often staying on the sidelines of political events. He spoke at many conferences and advised prominent leaders, but would avoid opportunities for responsibility and leadership whenever they were presented.

Ginsberg's first significant political action was founding the Bnei Moshe, a secret political organization, in 1889, and assuming leadership. He also joined the Odessa committee, a committee advocating for the immigration of Jewish people to Israel, along with many of his Bnei Moshe brethren from 1891 to 1895.

Ahad Ha'am's influence in the political realm stemmed more from his impact on political leaders and his spiritual authority than from any official role he held. For the "Democratic Fraction", a party that espoused cultural Zionism (founded in 1901 by Chaim Weizmann), he served "as a symbol for the movement's culturalists, the faction's most coherent totem. He was, however, not – certainly not to the extent to which members of this group, especially Chaim Weizmann, would later contend – its chief ideological influence." Though the party wished for Ahad's participation or even endorsement, he would remain uninvolved.

Ahad Ha'am was a talented negotiator. He used his skills in compromise during the "language controversy" that accompanied the founding of the Haifa Technikum (today: the Technion) and in the negotiations culminating in the Balfour Declaration. Ahad Ha'am was also a close advisor to Chaim Weizmann and other British Zionists at the time of the negotiations. After the Balfour Declaration he held a position on the Zionist "Political Committee", along with being a powerful advisor to the British Zionists as they battled anti-Zionist efforts.

=== Ahad Ha'am Versus Theodor Herzl ===
Ahad Ha'am had the potential to represent a political alternative to Theodor Herzl after the First Zionist Congress in Basel. His critique of the congress, along with his success in convincing the 160 delegates of the All-Russian Zionism Conference to support his beliefs, provided a strong foundation for a countermovement to Herzl's vision. Despite this strong support, Ahad's choices to not join the second Congress and defend his position, as well as call for the dissolution of Bnei Moshe in 1895 and 1897, resulted in Herzlian Zionism becoming the dominant approach. Ahad Ha'am and Theodor Herzl would remain rivals for years, and their conflicting views would spark disagreements between Eastern and Western Zionists throughout the early twentieth century.

== Legacy and commemoration ==
Many cities in Israel have streets named after Ahad Ha'am. In particular, in Tel Aviv a street was named after him by the city in order to get him to live in the city, he received house no. 1 on the street. In Petah Tikva there is a high school named after him, Ahad Ha'am High School. There is also a room named after him at the Beit Ariela Library, Ahad Ha'am Room.

== Published works ==
- Ten Essays on Zionism and Judaism, Translated from the Hebrew by Leon Simon, Arno Press, 1973 (reprint of 1922 ed.). ISBN 0-405-05267-7
- Essays, Letters, Memoirs, Translated from the Hebrew and edited by Leon Simon. East and West Library, 1946.
- Selected Essays, Translated from the Hebrew by Leon Simon. The Jewish Publication Society of America, 1912.
- Nationalism and the Jewish Ethic; Basic Writings of Ahad Ha'am, Edited and Introduced by Hans Kohn. Schocken Books, 1962
