= Thomas Haycraft =

English lawyer in the British Colonial Service

Sir Thomas Haycraft

Chief Justice of the Supreme Court of Palestine
- In office 1921 – 1927
- Succeeded by: Michael McDonnell

Chief Justice of Grenada
- In office 1916 – 1921
- Preceded by: F. Hardyman Parker
- Succeeded by: George O'Donnell Walton

Personal details
- Born: Thomas Wagstaffe Haycraft; 5 October 1858 Islington, London, England
- Died: 16 July 1936 (aged 77) Surrey, England
- Spouse: Pauline Richard (m. 1891)
- Relations: John Berry Haycraft (brother)
- Children: 1
- Education: St John's College, Oxford
- Occupation: Barrister

Sir Thomas Wagstaffe Haycraft (5 October 1858 – 16 July 1936) was an English barrister of the British Colonial Service. Haycraft served as Chief Justice of Grenada from 1916 to 1921 and Chief Justice of Palestine from 1921 to 1927. In the latter role, he headed the Haycraft Commission of Inquiry which looked into the causes of the Jaffa Riots.

== Life and career ==
Haycraft was born in Islington, London, the son of actuary John Berry Haycraft (1832–1862) and his wife, Mary Wyatt Candler. John Berry Haycraft was his older brother. He was educated at St. John's College, Oxford, and in 1885 was called to the Bar by the Inner Temple.

He practised on the South Eastern Circuit and served as an arbitrator on the London Chamber of Arbitration and as an examiner of the High Court. In 1899, he was appointed President of the District Court of Larnaca. After 12 years in Cyprus, he was transferred as Police Magistrate to Gibraltar, before being transferred again in 1913 to be a Puisne Judge in Mauritius. In 1916, he was promoted to Chief Justice of Grenada. In 1921, he went to Palestine to serve as the first British Chief Justice of Palestine. He retired in 1927 and died in Surrey in 1936.

In 1891, he married Pauline Richard, daughter of Captain Paul Richard of the French Imperial Guard. They had one son, Brigadier Thomas Wagstaffe Richard Haycraft.
