= Fiszman =

Fiszman is a surname of Yiddish origin, being a variant of the surname Fischman. Notable people with the surname include:

- Danny Fiszman (1945-2011), English diamond dealer
- Jack Fishman (1930-2013), born Jacob Fiszman, Jewish-American pharmaceutical researcher
- Jakub Fiszman (1956-1996), German abduction and murder victim
- Jean-Louis Fiszman (1960-2021), French caricaturist, illustrator, and comic book author
- Sergio Fiszman (born 1955), Argentine former wrestler

== See also ==
- Fishman (surname)
