= Ha-Shiloaḥ =

Hebrew-language literary journal

- Editor: Ahad Ha'am (1896–1902); Joseph Klausner (1903–26); Hayim Nahman Bialik (1904–9); Jacob Fichman (1925–6)
- Founder: Ahad Ha'am
- First issue: 1896
- Final issue: 1926
- Country: Russia, Germany, Mandatory Palestine
- Language: Hebrew

Ha-Shiloaḥ (Hebrew: הַשִּׁלֹחַ) was a Hebrew-language literary journal, founded by Ahad Ha'am and the Ahi'asaf Publishing House in 1896. He edited the journal until December 1902, whereupon it came under the editorship of historian Joseph Klausner. It ceased publication in 1926. The journal's title refers to the text of Isaiah 8:6. Initial financing for Ha-Shiloaḥ was provided by businessman Kalonymus Ze’ev Wissotzky under the condition that Ahad Ha'am would be editor.

Since Russian censorship laws made it difficult to obtain a license to publish the journal there, it was first printed in Berlin from 1896 until 1900 and then later in Krakow from 1901 to 1905. The chaos of the Russian Revolution interfered with its printing for two years from 1905. Permission to publish in Russia was granted in 1907 while editing was done in Odessa and Warsaw, while the vast majority of readership lived in Russia. Ha-Shiloaḥ experienced financial problems due to the considerable increase in printing and paper costs coupled with an underwhelming number of initial subscribers, causing significant losses. The division of administrative work between Ahad Ha’am in Berlin and the administrators in Warsaw put further strain on the journal, leading to a period between October and December 1897 where publication was suspended to reorganize. Following the interruption of the 1905 Russian Revolution, Ha-Shiloaḥ was then relaunched on a firmer economic and administrative basis as well as an increase in readership.

== Intent ==
Ha-Shiloaḥ was created at a time where no major Hebrew monthlies existed. Ahad Ha’am wanted to create a journal that could compare to the most important European monthlies at the time such as English Contemporary Review in England or Revue des Deux Mondes in France, which led to Ha’am having exceptionally high content and editing standards. He intended for the journal to be devoted to Zionism, Jewish scholarship, and belles lettres in a style that was accessible to the average reader and not to a specific or limited audience. The periodical was meant to be a means to raise the national consciousness of Jewish people and to be a central platform for the discussion and analysis of issues facing the Jewish community in the past and present. Ha’am stressed that the journal would not serve as a platform for scientific discussions or debates on abstract issues in order to further expand accessibility to the masses. Due to Ha’am's adherence to the Hibbat Zion and cultural Zionist movement, the monthly often expressed antagonism towards Theodor Herzl and political Zionism.

Te'udat Ha-Shiloaḥ

The first issue of Ha-Shiloaḥ in October 1896 contained a statement of purpose by Ahad Ha’am that outlined the structure of the journal as well as his intent in its creation and his editing style. He stated that Hebrew literature would be a tool to raise the voice of the Jewish people through revealing knowledge of the “inner world” of Judaism. Ha’am claimed that Hebrew or Jewish literature thus far had been superficial and had not awakened the Jewish national consciousness.

Ahad Ha’am divided the periodical into four categories that works will fall into:

- Articles on Science/Scholarship (pirke hokmah) – This section focused on phenomena related to the life of Jews and spiritual development throughout history, along with articles on general science concerned with Judaism.
- Publicistics – Included articles regarding those aspects of culture that exclude the arts. Works in this category often explained phenomena pertaining to Jewry, reasons and consequences for it, and offering methods of improvement.
- Criticism – Ahad Ha’am’s goal for this section was to judge “the law of the human spirit and the fruit of his labor” as it relates to truth (logical critique), the good (moral critique), and to beauty (aesthetic critique). Criticism would not be limited to only books, but extended to all ideas and actions.
- Belles lettres (beletristica) – This category would include works of poetry and stories related to past and present Jewish life or commentary on the “inner world” of Jewish national life. Ha’am specified that this section would not simply include flowery or “beautiful work in which there is nothing but beauty,” and thus would be a fairly short and limited section.

== Editorial Style ==
Ahad Ha'am

The editorial style of Ahad Ha’am is characterized by strict standards and meticulous editing to ensure Ha-Shiloaḥ remained exactly within his vision. Originally Ha’am believed that, in order to reach the Jewish masses, European culture must be allowed to infuse into Hebrew literature, but his attitude changed upon the journal’s creation. He restricted topics treated in the monthly to only those related to Jewish affairs and did not allow translations of any materials. His desire to make Ha-Shiloaḥ a journal for the masses meant that it did not have any party affiliations or adherence to any specific ideas, which attracted a broader spectrum of contributors than a party-affiliated journal would. Ha'am did not weight his own views more heavily than those of others.

Ahad Ha’am exhibited exceptionally strict editorial practices that garnered some discontent among writers. He dedicated most of his time to editing contributions to Ha-Shiloaḥ, and he refused to have an assistant despite being too occupied to submit articles to the journal himself. Ha’am wanted the journal to be pedagogical and didactic in nature, so he proofread works, adding or cutting parts to bring clarity to readers, but he did not change the meaning of any of the manuscripts. He would either make the changes himself or return the work to the contributor with suggestions on revisions. Ha’am aimed to protect the Hebrew style and taste of the readers from being spoiled while also nurturing the public image of his authors by not printing anything that would lessen respect for them. Every article produced under Ha’am’s editorship was altered to degree.

Ahad Ha’am’s overbearing editorial style garnered negative reactions from many of Ha-Shiloaḥ’s contributors. Some writers considered this treatment to be humiliating and began to turn their backs on Ha’am. One contributor, Micha Josef Berdyczewski, protested his editing by claiming it altered the voice of the contributors. Ha’am responded to this by stating that other publishers would see the writers’ works in Ha-Shiloaḥ and open the door for them to publish in their own style. All contributors were treated equally as he did not favor one over another. Even Joseph Klausner, who succeeded Ha’am as editor, and Hayim Nahman Bialik had works that were heavily corrected or rejected. His goal through such strict editing policy was to “train the taste of the Hebrew reading public up to the point at which they would cease to find pleasure in those exhibitions of bad taste and bad manners which were familiar in the Hebrew literature of that time.” Despite Ha-Shiloaḥ’s success, Ahad Ha’am gave up editing in the final months of 1902, believing that powers in which his work depended upon have continuously decreased.

Joseph Klausner

Although Ahad Ha’am believed Ha-Shiloaḥ should have been discontinued after his resignation, he still handed editorship to contributor Joseph Klausner. He was often considered a disciple of Ha’am, although he did not accept that characteristic. Klausner belonged to a younger generation of Zionist thinkers that was characterized by a desire to widen the scope of Jewish culture and Hebrew literature. His appointment as editor faced strong opposition as writers thought of him as too inexperienced, but Ha’am refused to hand the position to anyone else. Joseph Klausner assumed editorship of Ha-Shiloaḥ in 1903 and would remain as the journal’s editor until its final issue in 1926.

Immediately after becoming editor, Joseph Klausner enacted significant changes that reflected the changing literary tastes of his time. He outlined these changes in the first issue of the rehabilitated magazine in January 1903 in an article titled “Megamatenu,” or “Our Mission.” Klausner stated that the character of Ha-Shiloaḥ will mirror the Jewish mindset and that he will continue to fight against both enemies and friends that spoke in an “unworthy manner.” He also mentioned that particular attention would be paid to the younger generation who were dissatisfied with the state of affairs of the Jewish people. Klausner’s goals were ultimately to bridge the gap between the Hebrew writers contemporary to him and the older generation of writers like Ahad Ha’am.

The first editorial change Joseph Klausner made was to no longer restrict the publications scope to only works that pertain to Jewish history or culture. Klausner believed that this policy in the past forced Hebrew writers to suppress their natural, sincere human thoughts and that this change would open the door for a wider range of works. The second change made was to the belles lettres section. Klausner sought to expand this category that Ahad Ha’am had kept extremely limited in the past in order to reach a larger audience. Third, he promised to include more articles affairs of general interest while at the same time lessening the amount of scientific and scholarly works due to their unpopularity.

Upon reading Joseph Klausner’s changes to Ha-Shiloaḥ’s editorial policy, Ahad Ha’am was displeased. Ha’am expected to be informed of the changes before they were made due to his attachment toward Ha-Shiloaḥ, but Klausner wanted editorial autonomy despite Ha’am’s support being essential to the journal’s success. Ha’am was especially upset at the changes made to the publistics section where Klausner promised to include more articles on general matters. He claimed that Klausner would be unable to fulfill his promises due to a lack of talented writers and would therefore have to increase the amount of articles dealing with global subjects. Despite Ahad Ha’am’s protests at the changes made to Ha-Shiloaḥ, Joseph Klausner believed that his connection to youth would allow him to understand the needs of contemporary readers. Unfortunately, he failed to satisfy enough of his contributors and audience. After relocating to Palestine for a job opportunity as a professor of Hebrew literature, Ha-Shiloaḥ’s prominence began to dwindle, eventually leading to its demise in 1926 under Klausner.

Hayim Nahman Bialik

Under the editorship of Joseph Klausner, poet Hayim Nahman Bialik was appointed as co-editor of Ha-Shiloaḥ in 1904, leading the literary section of belles lettres that he often contributed to. Ahad Ha’am was apprehensive about this appointment, fearing that “the atmosphere of Warsaw might spoil the talent of Bialik.” Before accepting the position, Bialik made the condition that he would be completely independent in running the belles lettres section and dealing with contributors. He began to send letters to all belles lettres writers, extending invitations to them to work together with him on the section and even persuaded the prominent Yiddish writer Sholem Aleichem to translate some works into Hebrew to be published. However, once Klausner handed over all the materials collected for the section, Bialik was unsatisfied with its quality. His editorial policy followed closely with that of Ahad Ha’am as he often corrected or rejected material that did not meet his standards, but he always provided a reason for rejection for the writer. This caused such a scarcity of material that the belles lettres section was often filled with Bialik’s own works.

Bialik and Klausner often disagreed and misunderstood each other, leading to a lack of communication between the two editors. Klausner attributed this divide to their differing social and educational backgrounds, affecting their relationship along with their editorial work. Despite attempts by others to mediate conflict between Klausner and Bialik, the pressure on Bialik coupled with the burden of correspondence with contributors, led to his resignation. He announced his resignation suddenly in volume 21 Ha-Shiloaḥ, stating that his responsibilities would be relinquished at the beginning of 1910.

== Reception ==
Ha-Shiloaḥ received mixed reviews from the public after the publication of its first issue. Some saw it as a great advancement in the evolution of Hebrew literature, while to others it was a step toward restricting the Hebrew reader’s knowledge. This was due in part by Ahad Ha’am limiting the works in the publistics section to purely writings on Jewish history and culture. This insistence on narrowness of focus led to protests against the monthly, as Ha’am was accused of driving young readers away from Hebrew literature. Ha’am responded to this by stating that, while he understood the value of exposure to a broad scope of knowledge for Hebrew readers, Jews should first know their own culture and history and therefore that Hebrew literature should concern itself with this, first and foremost.. Despite its mixed reviews, nearly everyone accepted that no Hebrew publication of its kind would please a broad of readerbase and that it was unlikely to survive long.

Further controversy against Ha-Shiloaḥ and Ahad Ha’am arose from the generation of young writers that believed the journal did not appeal to them. Micha Josef Berdyczewski was one prominent writer who advocated for bringing European culture to every Hebrew and accused Ha’am of confusing this young generation. Also, the disregard for the belles lettres section would mislead readers to believe that poetry did not have real value as well as dissuade young readers. Ha’am responded to this point by arguing that the purpose of Hebrew literature to help the Jew understand and interpret their inner world did not have to be done creatively in order to achieve such a goal. Writers of the older generation tended to side with Ahad Ha’am, most famously Simon Bernfeld, who published an article defending Ha’am and his editorial style. He also believed that a majority of belles lettres was not suitable for the young Hebrew reader due to the lack of content that expressed the true feelings of the Jewish people.

== Contributors ==
The periodical's contributors included:

- Nathan Agmon
- Shmuel Yosef Agnon
- Ahad Ha'am
- Sholem Asch
- Asher Barash
- Bar-Tovia
- Simcha Ben-Zion
- Yitzhak Ben-Zvi
- Micha Josef Berdyczewski
- Isaac Dov Berkowitz
- Isaiah Bershadsky
- Simon Bernfeld
- Hayim Nahman Bialik
- Reuben Brainin
- Yosef Haim Brenner
- Ya'akov Cahan
- Hermann Cohen
- Judah Löb Davidovich
- Bezalel Elizedek
- Yitzhak Epstein
- Mordecai Ze'ev Feuerberg
- Jacob Fichman
- Shlomo Ginossar
- Pesaḥ Ginzburg
- Simon Ginzburg
- Uri Zvi Greenberg
- Haim Hazaz
- Joseph Elias Heller
- Aaron Abraham Kabak
- David Kahana
- Itzhak Katzenelson
- Joseph Klausner
- Samuel Krauss
- Jacob Levy
- Elhanan Leib Lewinsky
- Moshe Leib Lilienblum
- Aharon Litae
- Joseph Massel
- Eliahu Meitus
- Mendele Mocher Sforim
- David Neumark
- Hersh Dovid Nomberg
- I. L. Peretz
- Moshe Rabelsky
- Alexander Ziskind Rabinovitz
- Zina Rabinowitz
- Yehoshua Hana Rawnitzki
- David Remez
- Chava Shapiro
- Malka Shekhtman
- Pinḥas Shifman
- David Shimoni
- Avraham Shlonsky
- Zalman Shneour
- Gershon Shofman
- Shmuel Shrira
- Moshe Smilansky
- Simon Judah Stanislavsky
- Jacob Steinberg
- Judah Steinberg
- Eliezer Steinman
- Shaul Tchernichovsky
- Chaim Tchernowitz
- Shmuel Tchernovitz
- Zevi Woyslawski
- Abraham Yaari
- Hillel Zeitlin
