= Chava Shapiro =

Volhynian Jewish writer

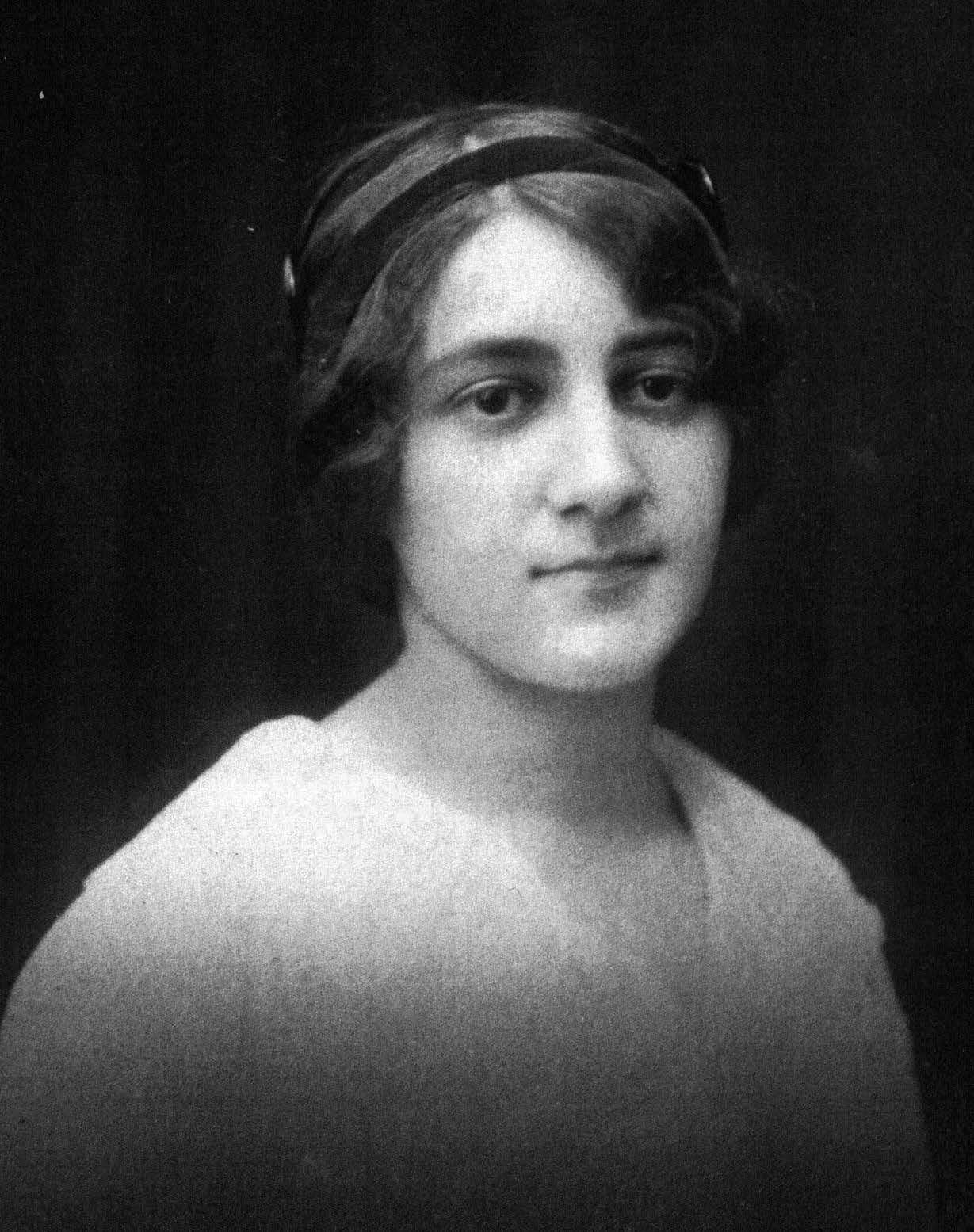
- Photograph of Chava Shapiro (c. 1904)
- Born: 26 December 1876; Slavuta, Volhynia, Russian Empire
- Died: 28 February 1943 (aged 66); Prague, Czechoslovakia
- Occupations: Writer, critic, and journalist
- Spouses: Limel Rosenbaum (m. 1895; div. 1907); Josef Winternitz (m. 1930)
- Writing career
- Pen name: Em Kol Chai (אֵם כָּל חָי)
- Language: Hebrew, Yiddish, German

Academic background
- Education: University of Bern
- Thesis: Lichtenberg als Philosoph (1911)
- Doctoral advisor: Ludwig Stein

Chava Shapiro (Hebrew: חַוָּה שַׁפִירָא, romanized: Ḥava Shapira, German: Ewa Schapiro; 26 December 1876 – 28 February 1943), (Note: Shapiro's birth date varies in biographical references, but is confirmed to be 26 December 1876 in her diary.) known also by the pen name Em Kol Chai (Hebrew: אֵם כָּל חָי, lit. 'Mother of All Living'), (Note: Shapiro's adopted pen name derives from the etymology of the name Chava given in Genesis 3:20.) was a Russian Jewish writer, critic, and journalist. A pioneer of Hebrew women's literature and feminist literary criticism, Shapiro was among the most prolific of the diasporic women writers of Hebrew in the early twentieth century.

== Early life ==
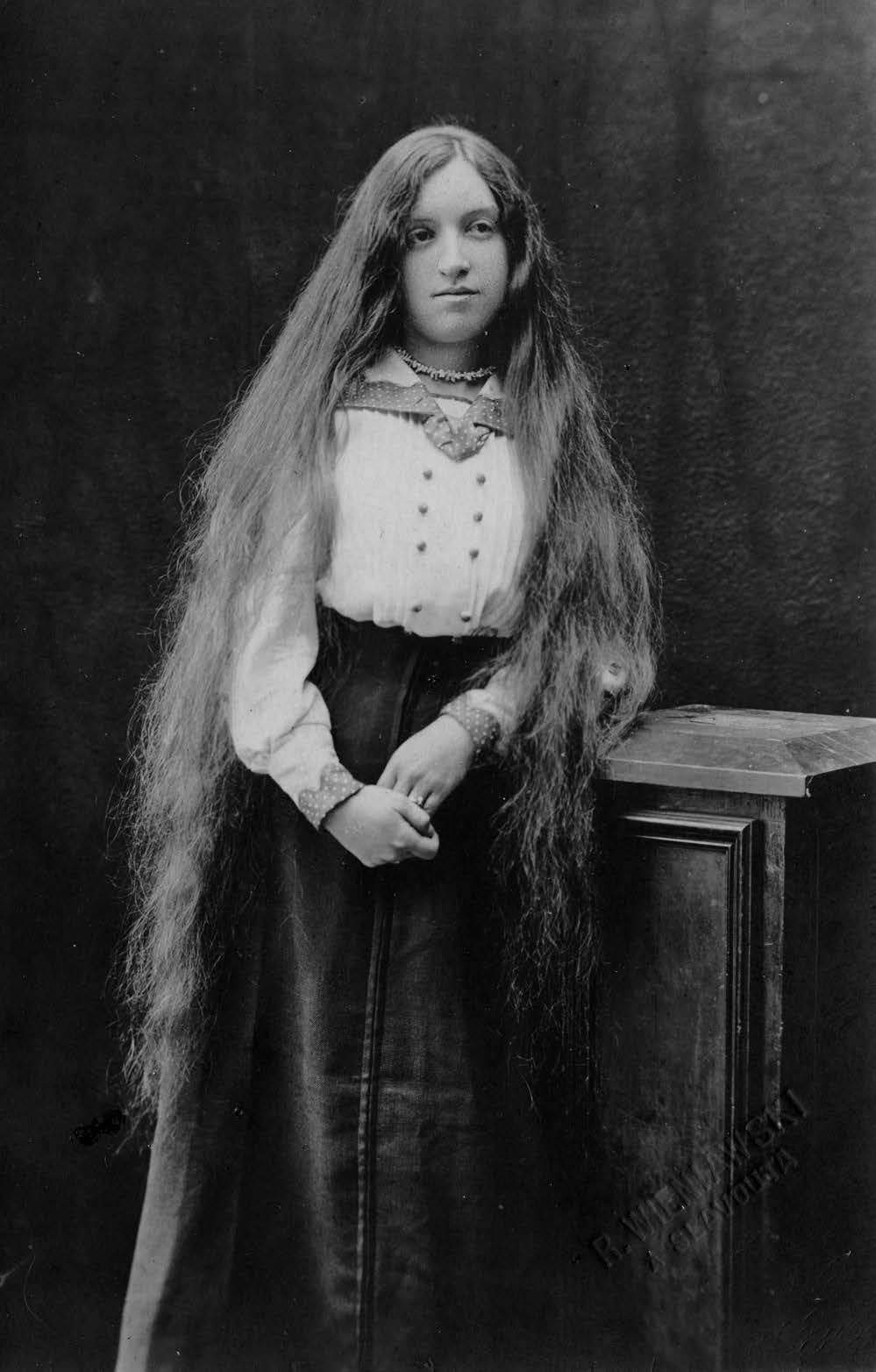
Chava Shapiro in 1894

Chava Shapiro was born on 26 December 1876 in the shtetl of Slavuta in the Pale of Settlement. Her mother, Menuchah (née Schoenberg), came from a well-educated maskilic family in Kishniev and was proficient in Hebrew. Chava's father, Yaakov Shammai Shapiro, belonged to the prosperous Shapiro printing family descended from Hasidic leader Rabbi Pinchas Shapiro of Koretz, a disciple of the Baal Shem Tov. The family established in 1791 the first Jewish printing press in the Russian Empire, the Slavita printing house, and owned numerous paper mills, flour mills, and other industrial plants. (Note: By the time Chava Shapiro was born, only the paper factory still belonged to the Shapiro family.)

Chava had three brothers and a younger sister from his marriage to Menuchah, and Yaakov Shapiro had two daughters from a prior union. (Her sister died from scarlet fever in 1893 at the age of 11.) Although she grew up in a traditional Orthodox household, Chava received a rich education in both Jewish and secular subjects, and enjoyed her family's support for her literary aspirations. She was considered an illui from a young age and, unusual for a girl at the time, received lessons in Talmud along with her brothers from the local melamed, who acknowledged her coming of age as a bat mitzvah. Members of Chava's family corresponded only in Hebrew, and her mother hired private tutors to provide her with instruction in Hebrew, along with Yiddish, Latin, Czech, French, German, Polish, and Russian. Shapiro participated in a local group of Agudat ḥovevei sefat ever ('Society of Lovers of the Hebrew Language'), which met weekly to read and discuss Hebrew literature.

== Family and education ==
In 1895, Shapiro entered into an ill-fated marriage with Limel Rosenbaum, the son of an affluent Warsaw banker, and their son Pinchas was born two years later. They lived in Slavuta with Shapiro's parents until 1900, when they settled in Warsaw. As her marriage deteriorated, Shapiro found refuge at the home of I. L. Peretz, who mentored her in writing. She participated in Peretz's Hebrew literary salon, where she met writers Mendele Mocher Sforim, Sholem Aleichem, Ben Avigdor, Hersh Dovid Nomberg, and Sholem Asch. Her first published work, a short story entitled "Ha-Shoshanah" ('The Rose'), appeared in David Frischmann's literary weekly Ha-Dor in December 1901 under the pen name Em Kol Chai ('Mother of All Living'). Shapiro became a regular contributor of fiction and cultural criticism to the major Hebrew periodicals, among the only women to appear in their pages.

Shapiro soon began an affair with Hebrew and Yiddish author Reuben Brainin, a married friend of her parents nearly twice her age, whom she met in May 1899 while vacationing with her mother and son at a spa in Franzensbad. Shapiro separated from her husband in 1903 against the protests of Brainin, who chose not to take a similar step (and would move to Canada with his family in November 1910). She moved to Vienna to prepare for university entrance examinations while her son remained with his father, and was granted a divorce in 1907.

She was admitted to the Department of Philosophy at the University of Bern in Switzerland, where she lived with her brother. Her thesis, written under the supervision of Ludwig Stein, examined the philosophy of Georg Christoph Lichtenberg. In 1909 Shapiro traveled to Göttingen to meet Edmund Husserl, who helped her obtain manuscripts of Lichtenberg's writings. She graduated with a doctorate in 1910 at the age of thirty-four, and returned to Slavuta.

== Career ==
=== Early career ===
Shapiro continued to write short stories, fifteen of which were collected in Kovetz Tziurim (1909) Its publication became an important literary event because there were so few Jewish women writers at the time. The work is prefaced with the first feminist manifesto in Hebrew, lamenting the absence of women's voices in Hebrew literature. A lifelong Zionist, Shapiro visited Palestine in 1911 with David Frischmann and her parents as part of a delegation from the Warsaw Yiddish daily Haynt, subsequently publishing in Ha-Zman a three-part travelogue providing an account of the journey. In it she describes the developing Jewish community and its adoption of modern Hebrew. When she moved to Berlin in 1912, she established connections with leaders of the Zionist movement.

Shapiro began an illustrious career in journalism and literary criticism, writing articles in Ha-Shiloaḥ, Ha-Toren, Ha-Tkufa, Ha-Olam, Ha-Do'ar, Die Welt, and Selbstwehr. Writing almost exclusively in Hebrew, she penned articles about her own family history and reviewed books, plays, and contemporary European writers. Her first published essay—a review of a novel by Gerhart Hauptmann—appeared in Ha-Shiloaḥ in 1913. She traveled extensively throughout Europe, leading a "sophisticated, cosmopolitan life."

=== Life in Czechoslovakia ===
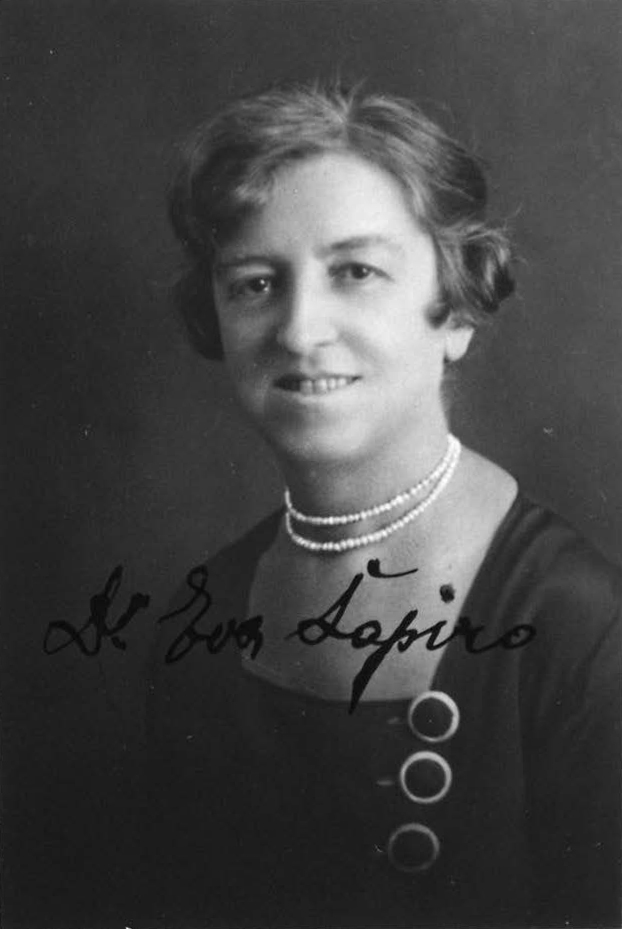
Chava Shapiro in 1927

Shapiro fled to her hometown at the start of World War I in 1914 to avoid internment as an enemy alien, spending the next five years between Slavuta and Kiev. With the intensification of pogroms following the War, Hayim Nahman Bialik invited her to settle in Odessa and join his literary circle, a plan interrupted by the outbreak of the Russian Civil War. When the Red Army temporarily retreated from Slavuta in August 1919, Chava and her son escaped to Czechoslovakia with the help of her father's former associate, a wealthy Christian forester. She lived at his home in Munkacs before ultimately settling in Prague. With the Soviet authorities' confiscation of her family's fortune, and her son enrolled in an engineering program at a polytechnical institute in Prague, Shapiro was forced for the first time to work to support herself and her son.

She became a Czechoslovak citizen on 28 February 1929 and in 1930 wed Josef Winternitz, a Jewish community leader of Prague. The marriage was an unhappy one, largely on account of her husband's mental illness. In 1937 Shapiro succeeded in sending her son to the United States, where he lived in St. Louis, Missouri until his untimely death in 1953.

=== Later work ===
Before departing for Czechoslovakia, Shapiro published "Female Types in Mendele's Stories", an essay on the representation of women in the work of Mendele Mocher Sforim. She later expanded the article into "The Figure of the Woman in Our Literature" (1930) and "The Woman Reader: Where is She?" (1931), surveys of female characters in contemporary Hebrew literature. As Czechoslovak correspondent for Ha-Olam, Shapiro was granted an interview with President Tomáš Masaryk on his 75th birthday (about whom she would publish a monograph in 1935), and regularly reported on the activities of Zionist organizations and the condition of Jewish life in Central and Eastern Europe. At the same time, she began gathering material for an autobiography she hoped to publish in Palestine, where she yearned to spend her final years. She also corresponded with editor Daniel Persky about the idea of publishing all her articles in a single volume. As the situation for Jews in Europe deteriorated, however, neither project came to fruition.

== Death and legacy ==
In September 1942, Shapiro was committed to a psychiatric hospital by the Nazi authorities, and released on 19 January 1943 to prepare for deportation to the Theresienstadt Ghetto. She died on 28 February 1943, six days before the deportation of her husband to the Ghetto, where he was murdered on 18 March 1944. Shapiro left behind a handwritten personal diary documenting her life from 1900 to 1941, when she relinquished it to a stranger for safekeeping, which is housed in the Gnazim Archive in Tel Aviv. Letters and postcards from her 29-year-long correspondence in Hebrew with Reuben Brainin are held at the Jewish Public Library in Montreal.

== Selected bibliography ==
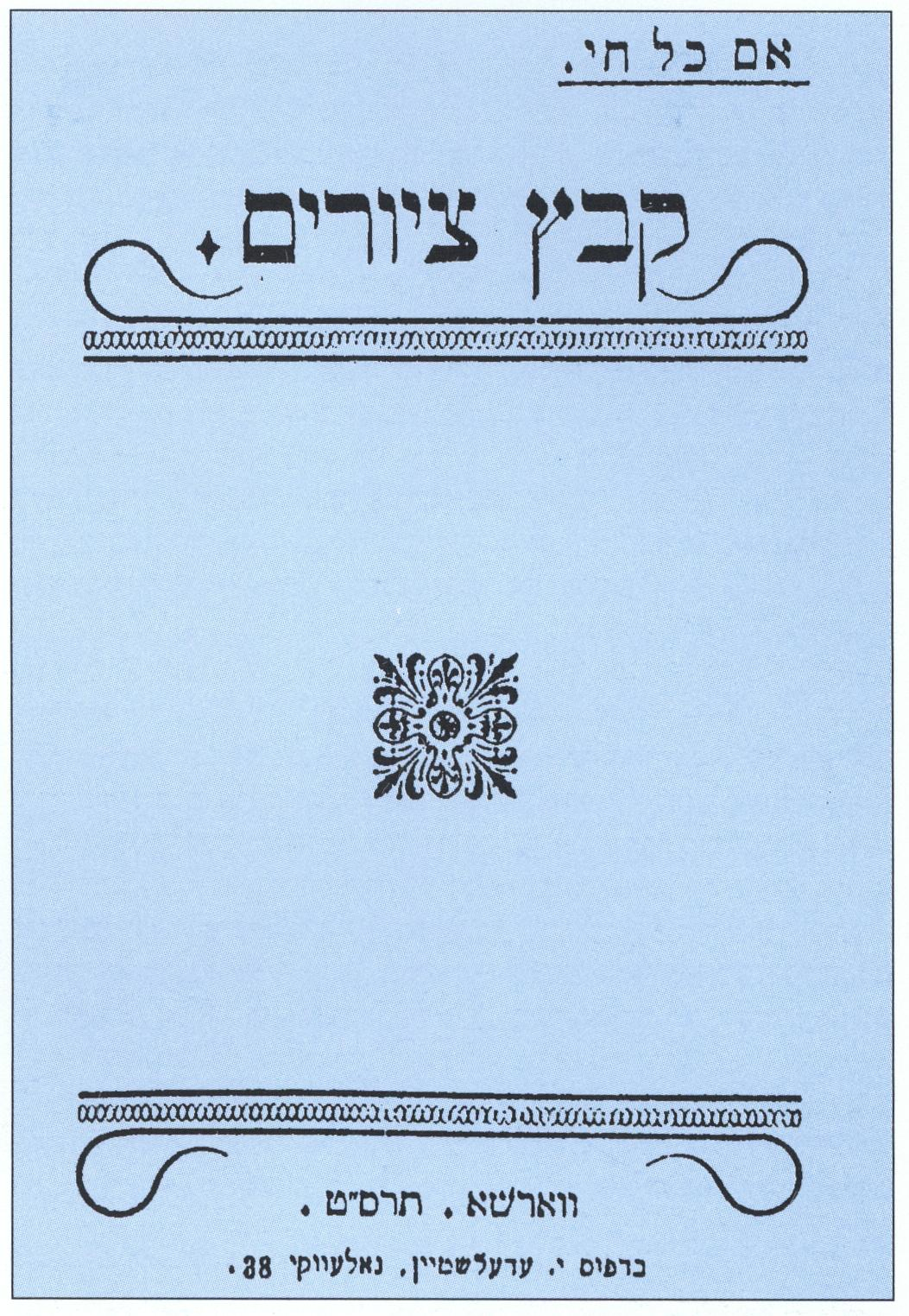
Kovetz Tziurim (1909)

- Em Kol Chai (12 December 1901). "The Rose". Ha-Dor (in Hebrew). 1 (48): 13–14.
- Em Kol Chai (4 October 1908). "Days of Awe". Hed Ha-Zman (in Hebrew). 209: 1.
- Em Kol Chai (1909). Kovetz Tziurim [A Collection of Sketches] (in Hebrew). Warsaw: Edelshtein. OCLC 25231247.
- Em Kol Chai (May–June 1911). "Notes from My Journey to Eretz Yisrael". Hed ha-Zman (in Hebrew). 107 (1), 108 (1), 117 (1).
- Shapiro, Chava (1911). Lichtenberg als Philosoph [Lichtenberg as Philosopher] (Dissertation) (in German). Bern: Max Drechsel. OCLC 1040214908.
- Shapiro, Chava (1914). "The Brothers from Slavuta (An Event that Occurred)". Ha-Shiloaḥ (in Hebrew). 30 (1): 541–554.
- Shapiro, Chava (1918). "Female Types in Mendele's Stories". Ha-Shiloaḥ (in Hebrew). 34: 92–101.
- Shapiro, Chava (1915). "On Death". Ha-Shiloaḥ (in Hebrew). 32: 63–69.
- Em Kol Chai (1920–1921). "Letters from a Tuberculosis Patient". Ha-Shiloaḥ (in Hebrew). 38: 122–131.
- Shapiro, Chava (1930). "The Figure of the Woman in Our Literature". Ha-Tkufah (in Hebrew). 27: 617–633.
- Shapiro, Chava (8 May 1931). "The Woman Reader: Where Is She?". Ha-Do'ar (in Hebrew). 10 (24): 386–387.
- Shapiro, Chava (1935). T. G. Masaryk, ḥayav ve-torato [T. G. Masaryk, His Life and Teachings] (in Hebrew). Prague: Brit Ivrit. OCLC 122855326.
