= Fishman (surname) =

Fishman is a surname of German or Ashkenazi Jewish origin. Notable people with the surname include:

- Alan H. Fishman (born 1946), American businessman and bank executive
- Beverly Fishman (born 1955), American artist
- Bill Fishman, American film director
- Boris Fishman (born 1979), American writer
- Charles Adès Fishman (born 1942), American poet and academic
- David Fishman, American academic and author
- Elliot K. Fishman, American diagnostic radiologist
- Gerald J. Fishman (born 1943), American research astrophysicist
- Hal Fishman (1932–2007), American newsman based in Los Angeles, who has been the longest-running news anchor in the history of television
- Herman Fishman (1917–1967), American basketball and baseball player
- Howard Fishman, American musician, writer and playwright
- Irving Fishman (1921–2014), American lawyer and Massachusetts politician
- Israel David Fishman (1938–2006), American librarian, founder of the Task Force on Gay Liberation
- Jack Fishman (1930–2013), Polish-born American pharmaceutical researcher
- Jake Fishman (born 1995), American-Israeli MLB and Olympic baseball player
- Jay S. Fishman (1952–2016), American manager
- Jerry Fishman (born c.1943), American football player
- Jerald G. Fishman (1945–2013), American electrical engineer and businessman
- Jessica M. Fishman, American author and behavioral scientist
- Joelle Fishman (born 1946), American writer and politician from New Jersey
- Jon Fishman (born 1965), American musician
- Joshua Fishman (1926–2015), American linguist
- Konstantin Fishman (born 1977), Russian footballer
- Louise Fishman (1939–2021), American abstract painter
- Mark Fishman, American cardiologist
- Michael Fishman (born 1981), American actor
- Mikhail Fishman (born 1972), Russian journalist and television presenter
- Mosess Fishman (1916–2007), American activist, leader of the Abraham Lincoln Brigade
- Nina Fishman (1946–2009), American-born British labour movement historian and political activist
- Osnat Fishman (born 1972), Israeli actress
- Paul J. Fishman (born 1957), American lawyer from New Jersey
- Peter Fishman (born 1955), Russian sculptor and painter
- Rob Fishman (born 1986), American entrepreneur and writer
- Rukhl Fishman (1935–1984), Israeli poet
- Steven Fishman (born 1957), American ex-scientologist, author of the Fishman Affidavit
- Sylvia Barack Fishman (born 1942), American feminist sociologist and author
- William H. Fishman (1914–2001), Canadian-American cancer researcher
- William J. Fishman (1921–2016), British historian and academic
- Yakov Moiseevich Fishman (1887-1961), Russian politician and revolutionary
- Yakov Leybovich Fishman (1913–1983), chief rabbi of Moscow

Fictional characters:

- Chuck Fishman, from the American television series Early Edition

Pseudonyms:

- Fishman (1951–2017), Mexican wrestler, born José Ángel Nájera Sánchez

== See also ==
- Danny Fiszman (1945–2011), diamond dealer
- Fichman
