= Adiva Geffen =

Israeli writer and playwright

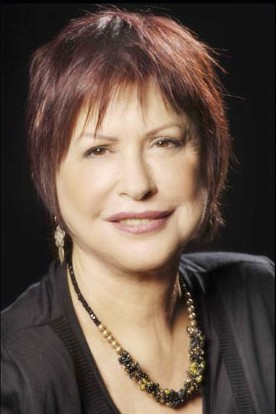
Adiva Geffen

Adiva Geffen (Hebrew: אדיבה גפן; born 1946) is an Israeli writer and playwright.

== Biography ==
Adiva Geffen was born in Haifa. She began her career as a special-ed teacher. After leaving the education field, she served as the spokesperson for the Habima National Theater for more than a decade. Geffen lives in Tel Aviv with her partner Aharon Meidan. Geffen has published 25 books, including children's stories, reference books and suspense novels. Her latest book "My Daughter’s Keeper" was published in 2022.

Geffen is a member of the board of the Hebrew Writers Association in Israel since 2015, and acting chairman of Gnazim Archive since 2016.

== Published works ==
=== Novels ===
- Murder at First Reading
- Chicago Bypass
- Till Death Dances Between Us
- The Day Love Died
- Transparent Women
- Love Second Time Round
- Piccadilly South
- Panama Jack
- The World According to Mother
- Tarzan, Jane and the Dishwasher
- Diamond Dust
- Last Stop Arad
- A Shadow of an Angel
- She Was Not There
- Missing
- Clara's Boys
- Surviving the forest
- Matinée

=== Children books ===
- The new House of the Zebra Gayla
- The amazing story of the Zebra Gayla
- THE Angel of the Colors And His Assistants
- The Girl who Wanted to be a Princess

=== Plays ===
- Citron in the Falls
- Alice Lost & Found
- Costa Rica Dream
- Shameless Heirs
- Hurry, Hurry Songs - Children Songs by Miriam Yalan-Shteklis
