= Ismar Elbogen =

German rabbi, scholar and historian

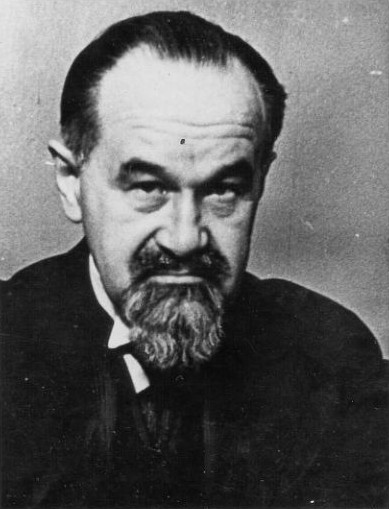
- Ismar Elbogen.
- Born: September 1, 1874; Schildberg, Posen, Prussia
- Died: August 1, 1943 (aged 68); New York City, New York, United States

Ismar Elbogen (September 1, 1874 – August 1, 1943) was a German rabbi, scholar and historian.

== Biography ==
Yitzhak Moshe (Itamar) Elbogen was born in Posen. He was taught by his uncle, Jacob Levy, author of the "Neuhebräisches Wörterbuch", and then attended the gymnasium and the Jewish Theological Seminary in Breslau. He earned his doctorate from the Breslau University and was ordained as a rabbi in 1899.

== Academic career ==
Elbogen served as a lecturer on Biblical exegesis and Jewish history at the Collegio Rabbinico Italiano in Florence. In 1902 he became privat-docent at the Lehranstalt für die Wissenschaft des Judentums in Berlin. He fled Nazi Germany in 1938, and taught at the Jewish Institute of Religion in New York, the Jewish Theological Seminary and Hebrew Union College.

He is the author of Jewish Liturgy: A Comprehensive History. Originally published in German in 1913, this book was updated in a number of subsequent Hebrew editions. The latest Hebrew edition was translated into English by Raymond P. Scheindlin, and published by the Jewish Publication Society in 1993.

This work covers the historical development of Jewish liturgy, from its foundational texts and the evolution of the medieval piyyut tradition to modern prayerbook reforms in Germany and the United States. Academic commentators frequently describe the work as a comprehensive study of Jewish liturgical history.

== Published works ==
- Der Tractatus de Intellectus Emendatione und Seine Stellung Innerhalb der Philosophie Spinoza's, Breslau, 1898
- In Commemorazione di S. D. Luzzatto, Florence, 1901
- Die Neueste Construction der Jüdischen Geschichte, Breslau, 1902
- Geschichte der Juden in Deutschland, Berlin, Erich Lichtenstein Verlag, 1935
- A Century of Jewish Life, Philadelphia, 1944
