= Hebrew Writers Association in Israel =

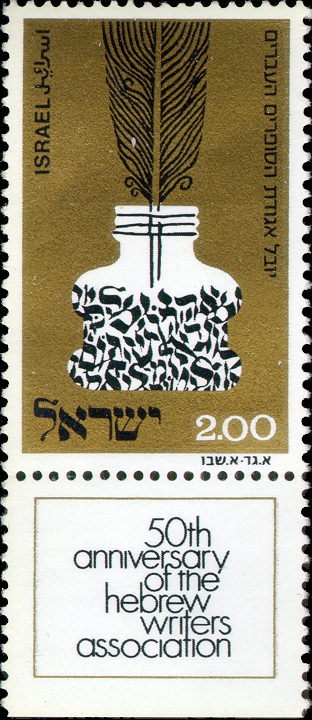
Postage stamp celebrating the 50th anniversary of the association

The Hebrew Writers Association in Israel (Hebrew: אגודת הסופרות והסופרים העברים בישראל, previously אגודת הסופרים העבריים בארץ ישראל or אגודת הסופרים העבריים or אגודת הסופרים העברים במדינת ישראל) is a professional association of writers and poets, who write in the Hebrew language in Israel. (There are also associations of writers in Israel who write in other languages, including Arabic.)

== History ==
The Association was established in Tel Aviv in 1921 by Hayim Nahman Bialik, to enrich the Hebrew cultural arena in the then Mandate Palestine. The first meeting was attended by some 70 writers and Nahum Sokolow was elected honorary president. Others who have held this position include: Hayim Nahman Bialik, Ahad Ha'am, Mordechai ben Hillel, Jacob Fichman, Asher Barash and Aharon Avraham Kabak.

The Association currently has approximately 450 members, including authors, poets, directors, and dramatists.

The Association publishes a literary journal called "Moznaim" (Scales), founded in 1928 by Hayim Nahman Bialik, the first issue being published on 15 March 1929.

In 1950, at the initiative of Asher Barash, the Association established Machon Genazim (Repository Institute), now known as the Asher Barash Bio-Bibliographical Institute, as a central archive for the conservation of works in Hebrew.

Other operations of the Association are designated for the promotion of Israeli writers and their work. The Association operates as a trade union, representing its members to ACUM, the publishers association of Israel, tax authorities and other institutions.

The offices of the Association are at "Beit HaSofer", Tel Aviv, which also houses the archives and editorial staff of the journal.

== Controversy ==
In April 2012, the Hebrew Writers Association in Israel launched a blistering attack on "What Must Be Said" and threatened to call for International PEN to "publicly distance itself from Grass'[sic] remarks and to come out against all expressions of delegitimization against Israel and the Jewish people".

== See also ==
- Gnazim Institute
- Hebrew literature
- Israeli literature
- Brenner Prize
- Lamdan Prize
