= Isaiah Bershadsky =

Russian novelist

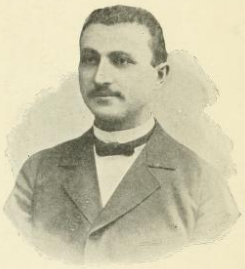

Isaiah Bershadsky (1872–1908) born Isaiah Domachevitsky, was a novelist from the Russian Empire.

== Life ==
Born in Saimoscha, near Slonim, government of Grodno, 1874; later a teacher in Yekaterinoslav. Bershadsky was one of the youngest Neo-Hebraic writers of fiction in Russia. Bershadsky died in 1908 in Warsaw.

== Works ==
His "Zikronot Tugah" (Sad Memories), in "Ha-Shiloah," vi. 405–416, is the story of a Talmudist who went into business, imitated the vices and extravagances of the rich, and, after being ruined by living above his means (a fault common to old-style Russian merchants), is a mental and physical wreck at fifty-five, with a devoted wife who did not share his pleasures but comforts him in his despair. In his silhouettes, "Ma'asim be-Kol Yom" (Every-Day Occurrences), which appeared in the "Aḥiasaf" calendar for 1901, he places before the reader memorable types and incidents. The best of them is probably "Ha-Shemu'ah" (The Report). This describes the agony of a liberal Jew when he learns from his sons, whom he has established in business in a great city, that they are compelled to embrace Christianity in order not to be ruined by expulsion. The anomalies of religious life are presented in their most cruel phases; for the author states that the old man was liberal and cared little about the religious conduct of his sons, sometimes even encouraging transgression in small things, but that he is crushed by their conversion, which is to some extent the outcome of their training under his supervision.

In his novel, "Be'en Maṭṭarah" (Without Aim), Bershadsky described the life of progressive Hebrew teachers in Russia, and the superiority of a Zionist idealist over a brilliant cynic, Adamovich, who is the hero of the novel, and who has no aim in life. These novels as well as two others, "Defusim u-Ẓelalim" (Types and Shades) and "Neged ha-Zerem" (Against the Current), were published by the "Tuschia" of Warsaw. Bershadsky also contributed several short sketches to "Ha-Dor."
