= Fichman =

Fichman (Hebrew: פיכמן, Russian: Фихман) is a surname, and may refer to:

- Jacob Fichman, Romania-born Israeli poet, essayist, and literary critic
- Jacobo Fijman (Fikhman), Argentine poet
- Mal Fichman, minor league baseball manager
- Niv Fichman, Canadian film producer and director
- Sharon Fichman (born 1990), Canadian/Israeli tennis player

== See also ==
- Fishman (surname)
