= Gnazim Institute =

Coordinates: 32.0767°N 34.7862°E

- Hebrew: מכון גְּנָזִים
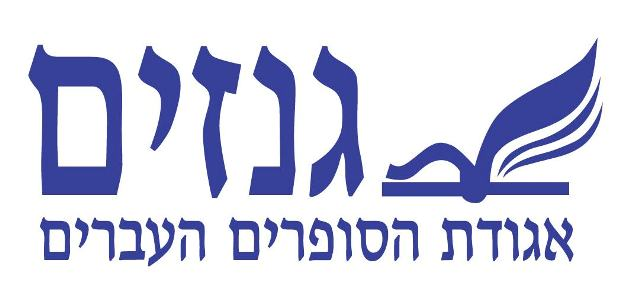
- Established: 1951
- Research type: Hebrew literature archive
- Field of research: Hebrew literature
- Director: Adiva Geffen
- Location: Tel Aviv, Israel
- Operating agency: Hebrew Writers Association in Israel
- Website: http://gnazimorg.startlogic.com/
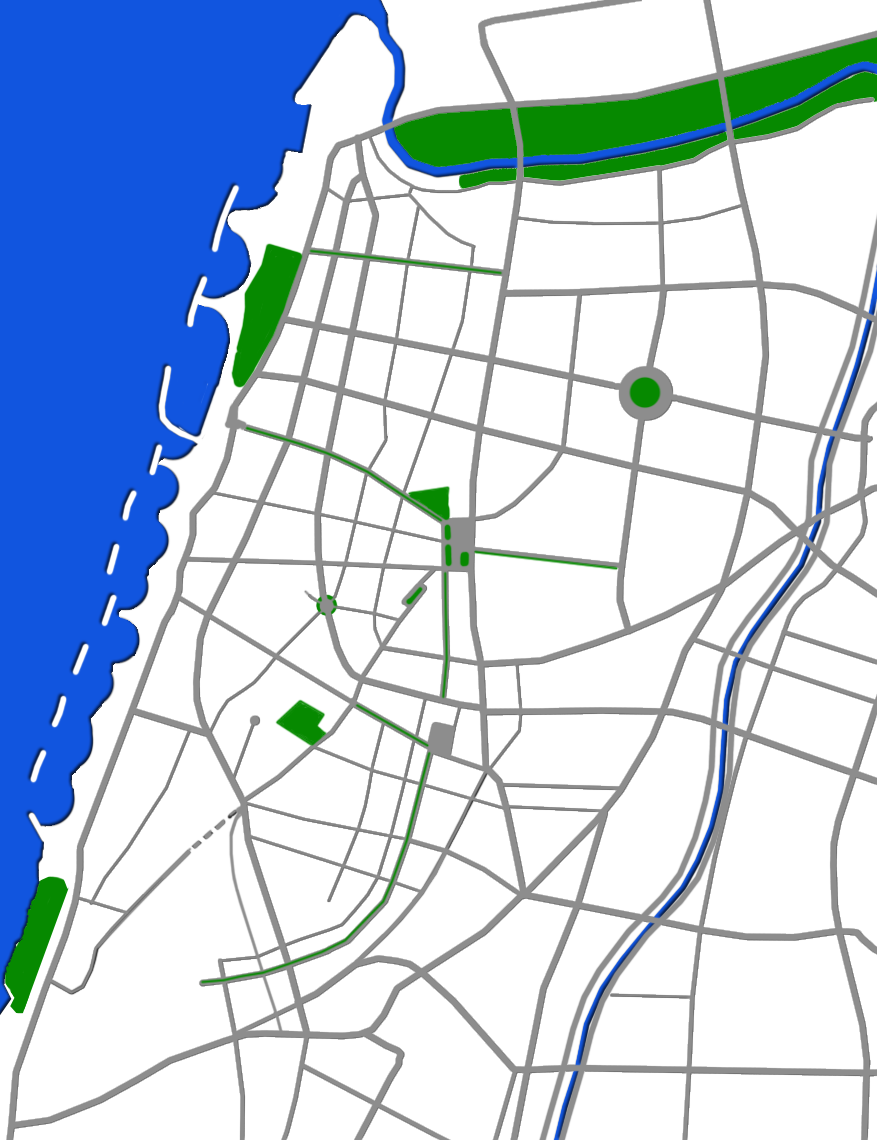
- Location within Tel Aviv Location within Israel

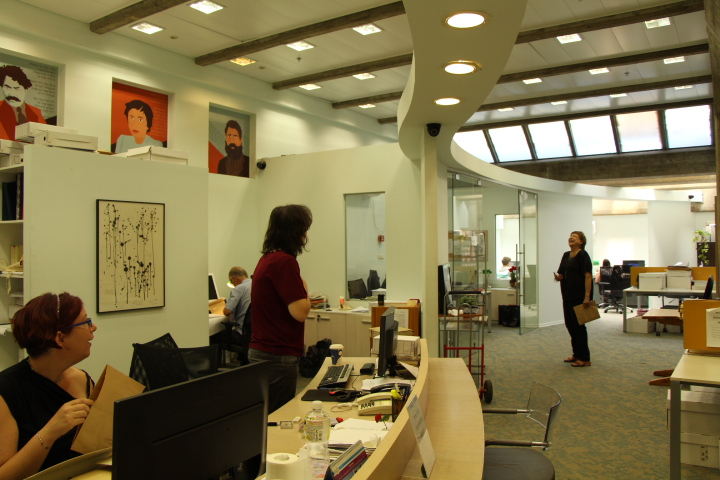
The Study Room at Gnazim Institute

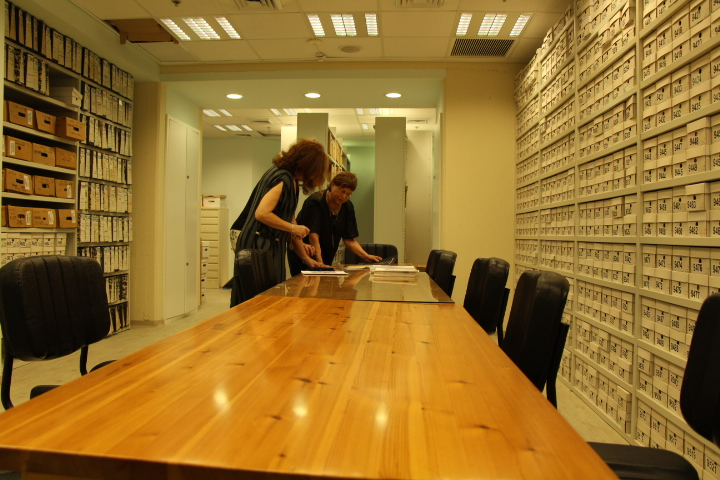
Collections room at Gnazim Institute

Gnazim Institute of the Hebrew Writers Association in Israel (Hebrew: מכון גְּנָזִים) (founded in 1950) is the largest Hebrew literature archive in the world. It is located at Beit Ariela in Tel Aviv.

== History ==
The archive was established in 1951 by the Hebrew Writers Association in Israel, at the initiative of the writer and editor Asher Barash. After his death, the institute was named after him. Barash served as its first chairman until his death in 1952. He was replaced by David Shimoni, who served until his death in 1956. The third chairman was Yehuda Burla.

The institute operated under the auspices of the Hebrew Writers Association until 2003, when it became an independent body. However, it met financial difficulties and in 2007 was relinked to the Hebrew Writers Association. In 2010 it moved to space in the Beit Ariela library complex in Tel Aviv, where it has room for work and study and the collections are kept in proper, monitored conditions. From 2016, the institute is chaired by Adiva Geffen, a member of the board of the Hebrew Writers Association.

Asher Barash wrote in 1951:

"In due time it will be an archive and gathering place for the entire Jewish creative work, for collecting writings by Jews in any language, first and foremost Yiddish."

== The Collections ==
The purpose of the archive was to assemble and preserve the works of the Hebrew authors who lived and worked in different countries and in Israel. It contains manuscripts, letters, various personal documents and photographs, as well as a unique collection of recordings. The institute currently keeps close to 900 personal archives of writers, poets, playwrights, researchers and thinkers from the middle of the 19th century to the present day. Among the literary artists whose archives are kept in Gnazim are Judah Leib Gordon, Shaul Tchernichovsky, Yosef Haim Brenner, Yehuda Burla, Rachel, Esther Raab, Leah Goldberg and Zelda and well-known contemporary writers including Yona Wallach, Avot Yeshurun, Yehuda Atlas, Nachum Gutman and Yonatan Ratosh.

It also holds manuscripts and letters of writers who were murdered in the Holocaust, among them David Vogel, Hillel Zeitlin and Shimon Dubnov. The archives of well-known Yiddish authors, including Zvi Eisenman, Mordechai Tzanin and the archive of David Hofstein, who was executed in the former Soviet Union by Stalin in 1952, are also preserved in Gnazim.

The institute serves researchers, scholars, media people, writers and the interested public in general. The Institute's treasures are exposed to the general public through various media channels, social networks, exhibitions, lectures, tours and artistic expressions such as plays based on archives.
