= Nahum Slouschz =

Russian-born Israeli writer

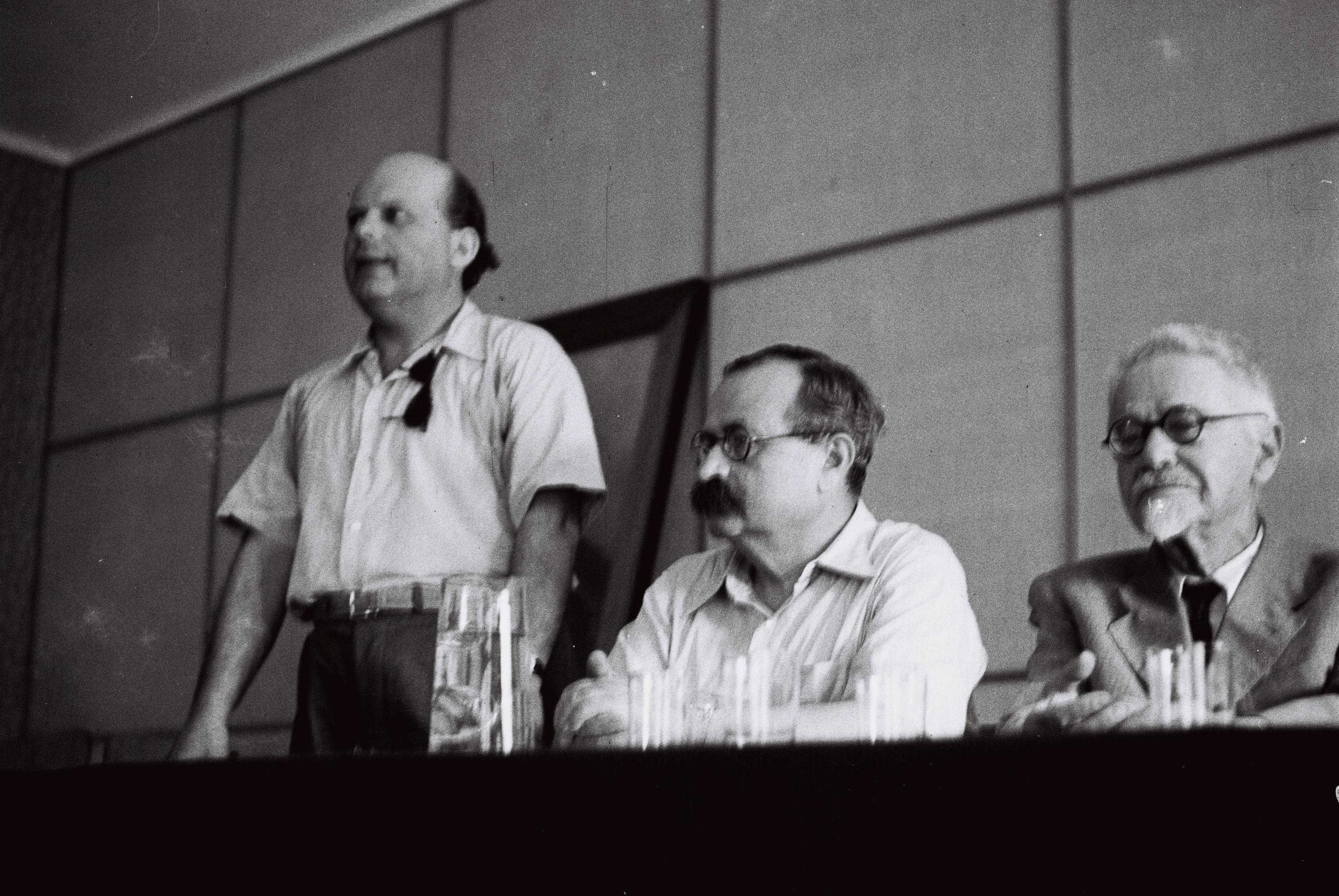
Nahum Slouschz (right) with S. Shalom (standing) and Asher Barash (center), 1948

Nahum Slouschz (Hebrew: נחום סלושץ; November 1872 – December 1966) was a Russian-born Israeli writer, translator and archaeologist. He was known for his studies of the "secret" Jews of Portugal and the history of the Jewish communities in North Africa, mostly, in Libya and Tunisia.

== Biography ==
Nahum Slouschz was born in Smarhon’ and raised in Odessa. He studied at a local school and was tutored in Jewish studies by his father. At nineteen, he was sent to Palestine by the Hovevei Zion Society of Odessa to explore possibilities of founding a colony in the Holy Land. He was not successful and returned home. In 1896 he traveled through Austria and Lithuania, and then went to Egypt and again to Palestine.

Slouschz was a devoted follower of Herzl and the Zionist movement. Slouschz established branches of the movement in Odessa and wrote at length about the Jewish question. He attended the Second Zionist Congress at Basel as a delegate and correspondent.

In 1898 he studied belles-lettres and philosophy at the University of Geneva. During this time, he helped to found the Swiss Federation of Zionists. In 1900 he went to Paris, where he studied Oriental languages. He earned a livelihood as correspondent of several newspapers, among them Ha-Melitz and Ha-Tsefirah. In 1902, he worked as a teacher in Auteuil. He completed his doctorate at the University of Paris in 1903 on the subject of the renaissance of Hebrew literature. His thesis was published first in French and then revised and extended for publication in Hebrew under the title "Korot ha-Sifrut ha-Ìvrit ha-Hadasha." In 1909, an English version of the thesis incorporating new material was published under the title The Renascence of Hebrew Literature (1743-1885). In 1904, he lectured on Neo-Hebraic literature at the University of Paris. In 1919 he immigrated to Palestine.

== Archaeology ==
In 1921, Slouschz excavated an ancient synagogue at Hamat Tiberias under the sponsorship of the Jewish Palestine Exploration Society. It was the first dig under Jewish auspices in the history of Israeli archaeology.

== Published works ==
Besides Slouschz's contributions to the journals, he published "Mah Ya'aseh ha-Adam we-lo Yeheteh" (Jerusalem, 1890) and "Ha-Osher me-Ayin Yimmatzeh " (1892), both translations of works by Paolo Montegazza; "Massa be-Lita" (1898); "Kovetz Sippurim" (Warsaw, 1899), a translation of some of Émile Zola's novels; "Keneset ha-Gedolah" (1899); "Massa be-Mitzrayim" (1900); "Ha-Kongres ha-Ziyoni ha-Revi'i" (1901), on the Zionist Congress; "Emil Zola, Khayav u-Sefarav" (1901); "Ktavim Nivkharim" (7 vols., 1904-1905), selections from Guy de Maupassant translated into Hebrew with a monograph by Slouschz.

== Awards ==
In 1942, Slouschz was awarded the Bialik Prize for Jewish thought.

== See also ==
- African Jews
- Pro-Jerusalem Society (1918-1926) - Slouschz was a member of its leading Council
