= Fischman =

Fischman or Fischmann is an occupational surname of German or Yiddish origin, literally meaning 'fisher' or 'fish seller'. Notable people with the surname include:

- Adolf Fischmann
- Eva Fischmann, birth name of Aviva Gileadi, Israeli nuclear scientist
- Fernando Fischmann
- Gerald Fischman
- Marian Fischman (1939–2001), American psychologist
- Naḥman Isaac Fischmann (c. 1809–1873), Galician writer
- Robert L. Fischman
- Scott Fischman (born 1980), American poker player
- Sheila Fischman (born 1937), Canadian translator
- Stephen Fischmann
- Suzi Weiss-Fischmann

== See also ==
- Danny Fiszman (1945–2011), diamond dealer
