= Shin Shalom =

Israeli poet, author, and translator (1904–1990)

Shalom Yosef Shapira
- שלום יוסף שפירא
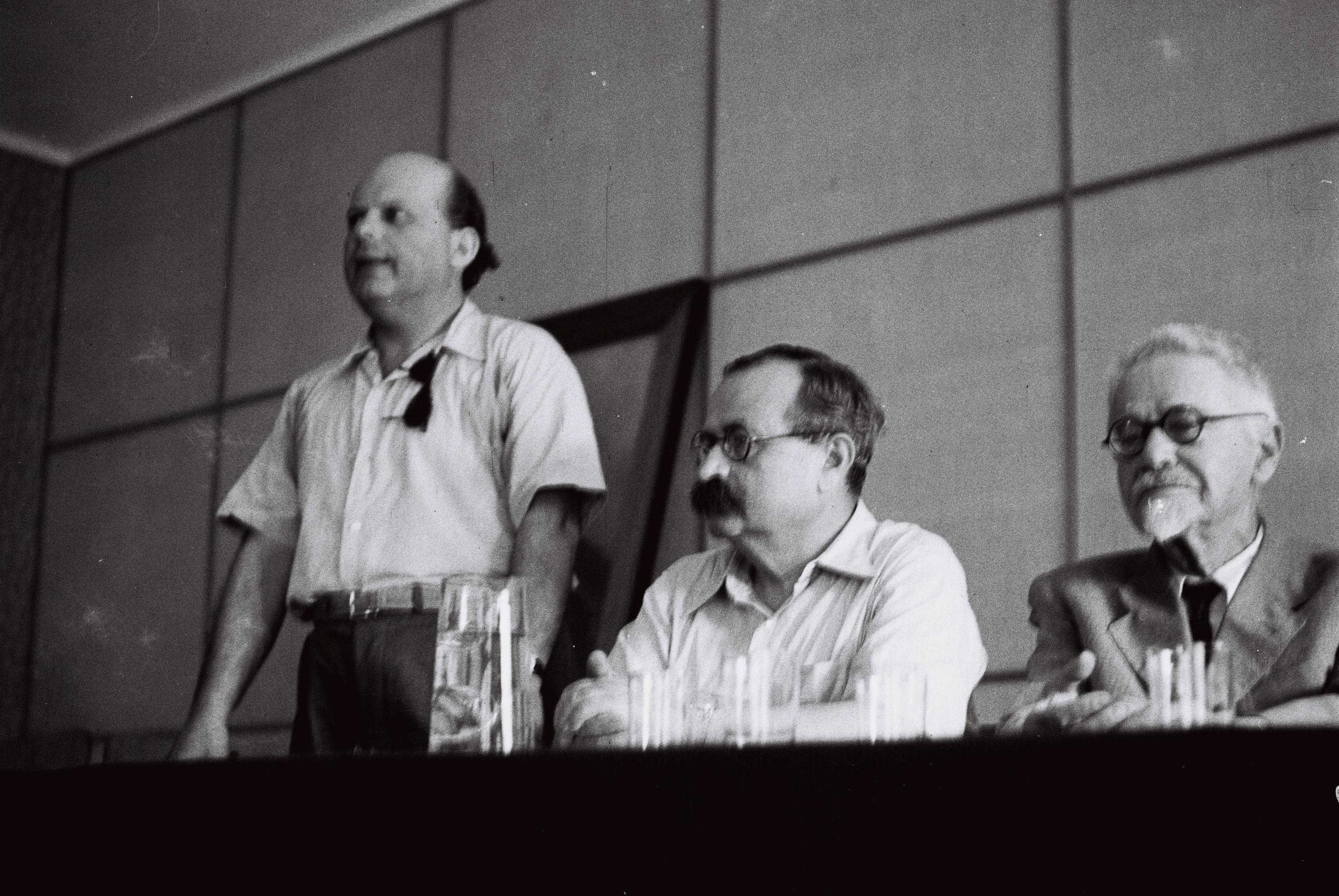
- Shin Shalom (standing) with Asher Barash (centre) and Nahum Slouschz (right), photographed during a Hebrew writers' conference in 1948
- Born: Shalom Yosef Shapira; 19 December 1904; Parczew, Russian Empire
- Died: 2 March 1990 (aged 85)
- Occupations: Poet, author, translator
- Notable work: Translations of Shakespeare's sonnets into Hebrew
- Awards: 1941: Bialik Prize; 1949: Brenner Prize; 1973: Israel Prize for poetry; Tchernichovsky Prize

Shalom Yosef Shapira, known by the pen name Shin Shalom (Hebrew: ש. שלום; 19 December 1904 – 2 March 1990), was an Israeli poet, author and translator. His poetry is known for elements derived form Hasidic and Kabbalah symbolism.

In 1973, Shalom was awarded the Israel Prize for poetry. He is also known for having translated all of Shakespeare's sonnets into Hebrew, a feat for which he was awarded the Tchernichovsky Prize. He was also the recipient of the Bialik Prize in 1941 and the Brenner Prize in 1949.

Shalom's brother, Yitzhak Shapira (educator) was the headmaster of the Hebrew Reali School from 1955 to 1983.
