= Jacob Levy =

Israeli historian and translator (1894–1956)

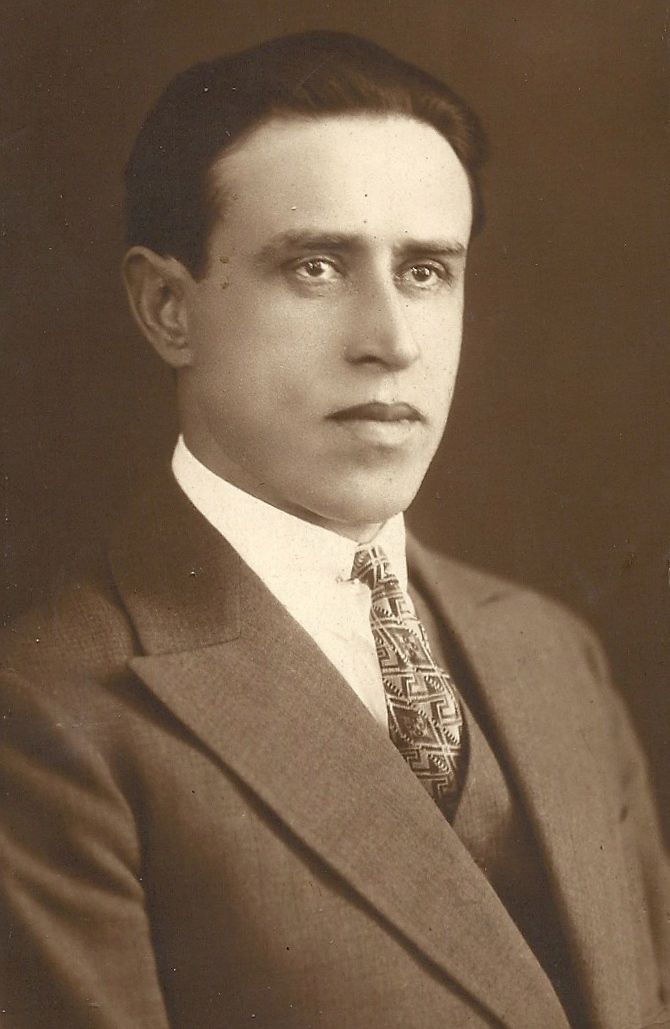
Jacob Levy, 1930, Sofia, Kingdom of Bulgaria

Jacob Meyer Levy (Hebrew: יעקב מאיר לוי Ya'akov Me'ir Levi; May 14, 1894 – September 8, 1956) was an Israeli educator, historian, translator and writer.

== Biography ==
Born to Moshe Levy and Masia-Leah (nee Barmack) in the Ukrainian village of Nesolon (then in the Russian Empire). Jacob grew up in one of only 3-4 Jewish families among the village's approximately 700 residents. Jacob's family was deeply religious and he was tutored in Jewish studies by private teachers who were brought to the village by his father. Considered a prodigy and with the expectation of becoming a rabbi, Jacob began studying at the Novograd-Volynsky Yeshiva at the age of 12, a school typically attended by much older students. However, the outside world attracted him.

Due to restrictions on Jewish admission to universities imposed by the authorities, Jacob pursued external studies, a common practice among young Jews influenced by the Jewish Enlightenment movement of the 18th-19th centuries. As a result, he became a Zionist and a socialist, and in 1914, at the age of 20, he left his family and with their support immigrated to Eretz Israel (Ottoman Palestine.) and turned his back on his religious upbringing.

Upon his arrival in Tel Aviv, Jacob enrolled in the Herzliya Hebrew Gymnasium, where he studied for two years (grades X and XI). As a student, he could stay in Eretz Israel without becoming an Ottoman citizen. Despite his knowledge of Hebrew, he likely wanted to absorb the day-to-day spoken Hebrew of the period. During this time, he began writing and attracted the attention of his Hebrew literature teacher - the acclaimed writer Y.H. Brenner, who foresaw in him a future as a writer.

When World War I broke out, the Ottoman government changed its policy toward foreign nationals, especially Jews. The Capitulations were canceled and foreign nationals had to choose between obtaining Ottoman citizenship and serving in the Sultan's army or being deported to their home countries. As an ardent Zionist and due to his hatred of the Russian Empire, Jacob easily decided. Towards the end of the 1916 school year, immediately after receiving his Turkish citizenship, he was drafted into the Ottoman army and sent, along with his classmates, to officers training in Constantinople (Istanbul).

In 1917 he taught Hebrew at the Jewish settlement Mesilla Hadasha near Constantinople built by the Baron Morris Hirsch as a transit station for Jewish pioneers from Russia on their way to Eretz Israel, where they received initial training in agriculture. As WWI cut off postal services in Europe, Jacob lost contact with his family, Concerned for their safety, he returned to Ukraine at the end of the war to see his parents. 1919 was a year of many pogroms in Ukraine, in addition to the forced conscription of young men into the Ukrainian Nationalist Army which was trying to maintain independence from the Soviet Union. Fearing conscription, Jacob spent only a short time with his family before moving to Korets then under Polish rule, where he ran a Hebrew school in the summer of 1919.

Meir Panas, a student at the school, wrote about the influence that Jacob had:

″Jacob Levy brought with him a fresh essence from the fields and the Galilee. He instilled [in the students] the living Hebrew of Eretz Israel. He introduced Hebrew terminology for the natural sciences and general studies. To truly appreciate [his] contribution, one needs to remember that there were hardly any Hebrew textbooks for these subjects in Russia at the time.″

Panas also described Levy’s other activities:

″Jacob, who deeply believed in the kibbutz ideals, was very enthusiastic about the Bolshevik revolution, truly believing that it will make these ideals universally accepted. Therefore, when the Communist party took control of Korets, they appointed him the deputy head of the revolutionary administration. The Bolsheviks so admired his talents and knowledge that he was effectively running it. Because of that respect, the Bolsheviks didn’t close his school down as they did others and Jacob continued as its headmaster.″

In 1920, Jacob was invited to run a school for abandoned children and war orphans in Turkey. His success there, without any prior pedagogical training, determined his future in education, despite his initial thoughts of studying engineering. He decided to study education to establish a cadre of local Hebrew-Zionist teachers in Turkey and to publish Hebrew textbooks that would meet the needs of Turkish Jewry. For that purpose, he traveled to Paris in 1921 to get a degree at the Sorbonne and its affiliated Institute of Psychology & Pedagogy. Unfortunately, while he was studying, the Atatürk revolution took place in Turkey and the new regime did not allow for the establishment of new Hebrew schools.

In 1925, the Jewish Consistory of Bulgaria appointed Jacob as the superintendent of the Hebrew schools in Bulgaria. There, he devoted himself to teaching and other instructional work in education, organized teachers’ training courses (led by Tzila Greenberg), published textbooks, a Hebrew-Bulgarian dictionary, and reading booklets for children. Together with Ms. Greenberg he published a 3-volume Jewish history textbook titled "Toldot Ameinu" (תולדות עמנו) (The History of Our People). Jacob became active in the "Hashomer Hatzair" youth movement and edited their Hebrew weekly publication "Gilayon", where he also contributed numerous articles and short stories. During these years he started publishing important papers on the teaching of reading and writing in "Hed ha-Hinuch" – the periodical of the teachers’ union in Eretz Israel. After his term in Bulgaria, he returned to Paris to continue his studies and in 1935 received his PhD in educational psychology, a nascent discipline at the time, from the Sorbonne. His thesis – “Maîtres et Eleves” (Teachers & Students) was published by the Sorbonne as a book that year. The book was translated into Italian in 1956 and is being translated into English (2020). In addition to education-related essays published in professional journals such as "Hed Hachinuch" (הד החינוך), he published short stories (under the pseudonym "Aharon Aharoni") in the most important Hebrew periodicals of the period: Y.H. Brenner's "HaAdamah" (האדמה), Joseph Klausner's "HaShiloach" (השילוח) and Jacob Fichman's "Ma-abarot" (מעברות).

Between 1938 and 1956 Jacob was the editor of "Hachinuch" (החינוך) – the Pedagogy and Psychology quarterly of the Israeli Teachers Association. During this time, he published many books, including "Israel Ba-Amim" ("Israel Among the Nations") – a series of history textbooks used extensively in Israeli schools, especially in the kibbutz movement. He was also an editor of the Encyclopedia Chinuchit" (Educational Encyclopedia אנציקלופדיה חינוכית) and published a series of teacher training books – "Guides" to elementary school grades.

His children: From his first wife Shoshana Taborovsky-Tavor) a son: Amnon (1918–1995) and from his second wife Shoshana Itygin a son: Avinoam (B. 1945).

== His work ==
Dr. Jacob Levy published numerous books. The most important ones among them: a series of history textbooks (in five volumes) and the translation of four of French-Jewish philosopher Henri Bergson's books into Hebrew.

In writing his history textbooks, Dr. Levy's viewpoint was that studying historical dates is less important that learning the processes that led to historical events. Indeed, in his series "Israel among the nations" one could hardly find dates and history is told in a narrative, compelling way.

== Books by Dr. Jacob Levy ==
- Maitres et Éleves Paris, 1935
- Israel Among the Nations (ישראל בעמים) (five volumes) Tel Aviv, 1948–1956; 1970
- Teaching Hebrew Penmanship (לשאלת הוראת הכתיב העברי), (with Moshe Birman), Tel Aviv 1945
- Teaching Hebrew: Methodology for Grades 1–2 Jerusalem, 1951; 1957
- Jean-Jacques Rousseau (ז'אן-ז'אק רוסו), Tel Aviv 1952
- 1st Grade Teacher's Guide (מדריך לכיתה א), Tel Aviv 1953
- 2nd Grade Teacher's Guide (מדריך לביתה ב), Tel Aviv 1954

== Translations (into Hebrew) by Dr. Jacob Levy ==
- Le Rire (Laughter הצחוק), Henri Bergson, Tel Aviv 1938; 1962; 1975; 1981
- On Dreams (Article החלום), Henri Bergson, Jerusalem 1940
- Le jugement moral chez l'enfant (The Moral Judgment of the Child השפיטה המוסרית של הילד), Jean Piaget, Tel Aviv 1940
- L'Energie spirituelle (Mind-Energy אנרגיה רוחנית), Henri Bergson, Tel Aviv 1944
- L'Evolution créatrice (An Introduction to Metaphysics מבוא למטפיסיקה), Henry Bergson, Tel Aviv 1947
- La Pensée et le mouvemant (Thought & Motion מחשבה ותנועה), Henri Bergson, Jerusalem 1953
