= Judah Löb Davidovich =

Russian Hebrew writer and translator

Judah Löb Davidovich (1855, in Vilna – 1 January 1898, in Odessa) was a Russian Hebrew writer and translator. After serving in the Imperial Russian Army, Davidovich studied surgery, but failed to find work as a feldsher. After a futile attempt to make a career as a singer, he settled in Odessa about 1885 as a private teacher. There he was influenced by Ahad Ha'am to turn his attention to Hebrew literature.

Davidovich translated into Hebrew Herbert Spencer's essay on education, with preface and explanatory notes, published by Aḥiasaf under the name Ha-Ḥinnukh (Warsaw, 1894). He also wrote two articles on educational subjects in Ha-Shiloaḥ (vols. i., ii.).
