= Elhanan Leib Lewinsky =

Russian Hebrew-language writer and Zionist leader

Elḥanan Leib Lewinsky
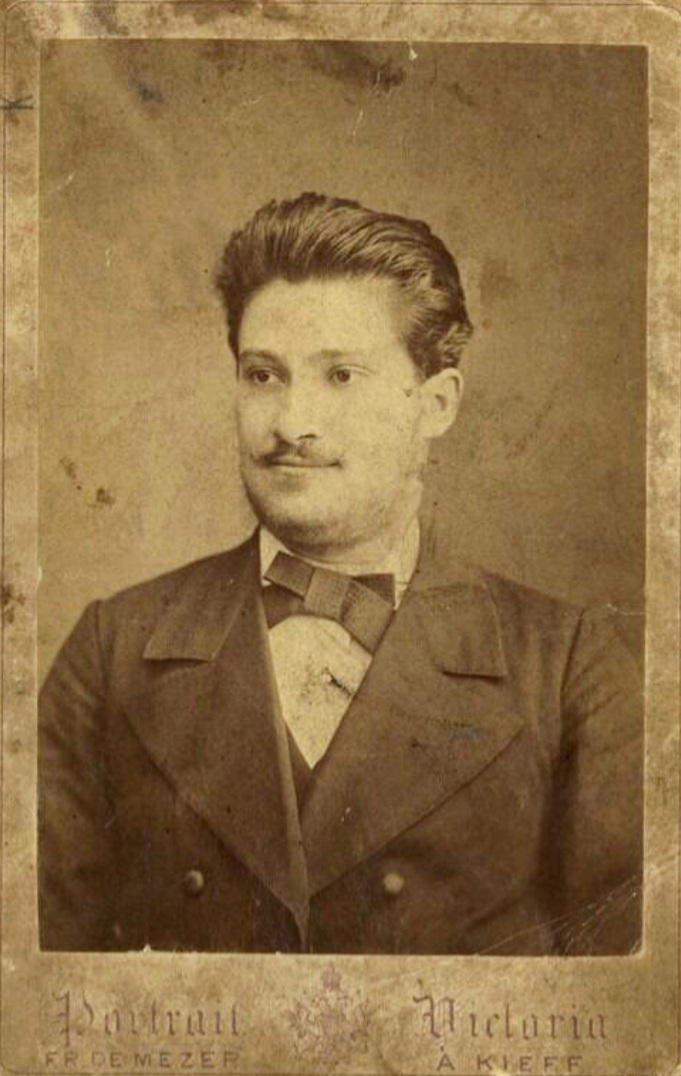
- Born: 21 March 1857; Podberezye, Vilna Governorate, Russian Empire
- Died: 27 October 1910 (aged 53); Odessa, Kherson Governorate, Russian Empire
- Writing career
- Pen name: Darshan Zaken ('Old Preacher'), Rabbi Karov
- Language: Hebrew

Elḥanan Leib Lewinsky (Hebrew: אלחנן ליב לוינסקי; 21 March 1857 – 27 October 1910) was a Hebrew-language writer and Zionist leader. His book Journey to the Land of Israel in the Year [5]800 is often described as the first work of science fiction in Hebrew.

== Biography ==
=== Early life and career ===
Elḥanan Leib Lewinsky was born to Jewish parents in Podberezye, near Vilna, in the Russian Empire. He received a strict Talmudic education, though at the same time acquainted himself with Hebrew literature of the Haskalah. He studied in Wilkomir and Kovno, and from 1874 he taught in Vilna, and towns in the Minsk, Chernigov, and Yekaterinoslav Governorates. In 1881 he moved to Kharkov to study medicine.

After the outbreak of the 1881–1884 pogroms, he abandoned his studies, joined the Zionist movement Hovevei Zion, and spent several months in Palestine in 1882. After his return to Russia he became an active member of Hovevei Zion; he established Zionist organizations in southern towns of the Empire, while at the same time working as a grain merchant. In 1896 his business collapsed, and he became a manager for the Carmel company, importing wine from Palestine to Russia. After that he settled in Odessa, and became one of the leading Zionists there.

=== Writing career ===
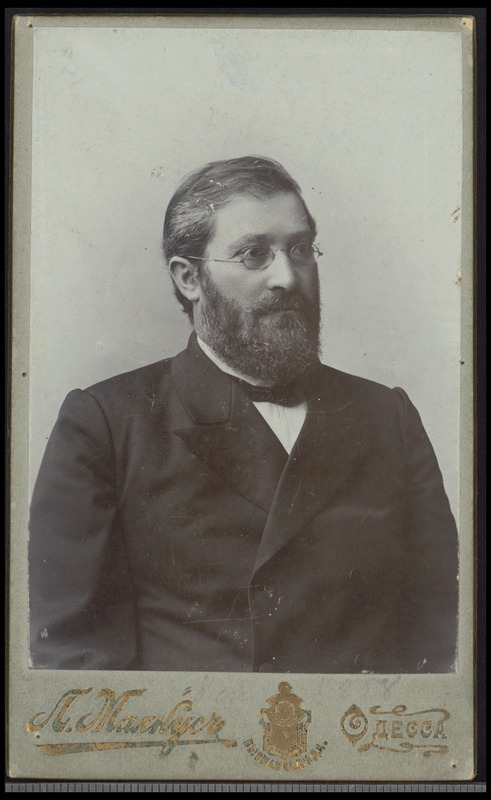
Photograph of Lewinsky (before 1900)

Lewinsky published his first articles in 1875. He himself considered 1889 as a starting point of the writing career, when he published several polemic articles against Sholem Aleichem and Yehoshua Ravnitski's ideas about the cultivation of Yiddish literature. His views on the subject changed during the time, and later Lewinsky even founded Yiddish daily newspaper Gut morgen in Odessa. In 1890 he published a travelogue that became quite popular.

His best-known work is Masaʻ le-erets Yisraʼel bi-shenat Tat ('Journey to the Land of Israel in the Year [5]800', 1892). It is often described as "utopian tale of a visit to a perfect, future Jewish state". The book was described as the first work of science fiction in Hebrew, and is often mentioned together with Theodor Herzl's Altneuland. The book is about a young couple on their journey to Israel, a popular tourist destination. As noted by the Haaretz journalist

There is no Temple and no Western Wall in Lewinsky's utopian Jerusalem. There is, however, an astronomy center: "The Mount of Olives is no longer a place of graves but… atop it is the acclaimed stellar observatory, for all the wise men of the world accepted Jerusalem as the prime meridian and founded there a universal observatory.

The book heroes, Yehudit and Elhanan, returned home after their journey and didn't make aliyah. Irmy Shik Blum finds this ironic, writing that this is "A very un-Zionist ending for the first Hebrew work of sci-fi. Maybe because in the end there's utopia and there's reality. And in reality, Elhanan Lewinsky was a grain merchant in the Diaspora, sitting on a train that got stuck in the snow."

In 1896 Lewinsky started to publish a series of feuilletons, Mahashavot u-ma'asim ('Thoughts and Deeds') in Ha-Shiloaḥ. In 50 issues he developed his character, a Jewish man name Rabbi Karov ('Rabbi Close-Relative'), who humorously discussed everyday issues.

Lewinsky was a friend of the Zionist Ahad Ha'am and the poet Haim Nahman Bialik, and was one of the founders of the Moriah Publishing House.

=== Death and legacy ===
Lewinsky died in October 1910. His funeral "attracted tens of thousands of people and countless warm words of eulogy." After his death, a three-volume anthology of his writings was published (1911–13). A two-volume edition was published 25 years later.

Lewinsky Street and Lewinsky Market in Tel Aviv are named in his memory.

== Selected publications ==
- Masaʻ le-erets Yisraʼel bi-shenat Tat [Journey to the Land of Israel in the Year [5]800]. Odessa: A. Dukhna. 1892. Published in Yiddish in 1911.
- Kitve A. L. Levinski [The Works of E. L. Lewinsky]. Odessa: Yavneh. 1911–1913.
