= David Kohn =

Russian archaeologist and Hebrew writer

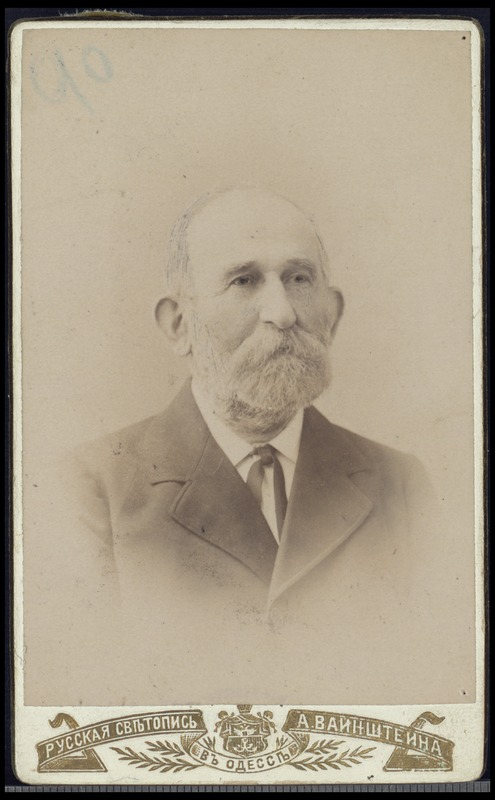
David Kohn

David Kohn (1838–1915) was a Russian archaeologist and Hebrew writer. He was born at Odessa and received a rabbinic education, but at the age of fourteen he took up the study of medieval literature and modern languages, and soon afterward, history and archaeology. Some of his early writings included essays on fossil animals, the life of Rabbi Solomon Bennet, the Messianic movement, and the origin of Hasidism. He also contributed to "Ha-Shiloaḥ."

Kohn was editor of the Aḥiasaf edition of Abraham ibn Ezra's "Diwan" (1894), as well as of Jacob Emden's autobiography and various other important works. He was also the first to attack Heinrich Graetz's criticism of the Biblical text, and to defend the Masorah. Besides the works already mentioned, he published: Meḥḳere Ḳohelet ben Dawid, a historico-critical introduction to the Book of Ecclesiastes; Masoret Seyag le-Miḳra, in defense of the Masorah against the hypercriticism of modern exegetes (1880); and Or we-Ḥoshek.

== Edition of Ben Sira ==
In Odessa he made an edition of the discovered Hebrew Text of the Wisdom Book of Ben Sira in Hebrew with introduction, a good reconstruction of the lost parts and vocalisation of the whole text,

- Dawid Kohn, Die Sprüche Simon des Sohnes Sirachs. Der gefundene hebräische Text mit Einleitung und Kommentar., Verlag "Tuschlija", Warschau, 1912
