= Jean-Louis Fiszman =

French caricaturist and comic book author (1960–2021)

- Born: 1960
- Died: 30 August 2021 (aged 60–61)
- Occupations: Caricaturist; Comic book author

Jean-Louis Fiszman (1960 – 30 August 2021) was a French caricaturist, illustrator, and comic book author. He worked for the magazines Auto Hebdo, Auto Plus, and Gazette médicale.

== Biography ==
In his comic strips, Fiszman tended to summarize Formula 1 races while parodying current events. He created parodies of every race from the 1990 United States Grand Prix to the 2012 Brazilian Grand Prix with the exception of the 1994 San Marino Grand Prix, out of respect for Ayrton Senna and Roland Ratzenberger, both of whom died at the race. He also maintained a cartoon column in Auto Hebdo until 2013, when his comics were cut out of the weekly issue due to financial issues.

Jean-Louis Fiszman died on 30 August 2021.

== Books ==
- Bobardements (1987)
- Grands Prix 90 91 92 (1992)
- La F1 dans tous ses états (1992)
- Auto folie : 1993, le sport automobile en délire (1993)
- La Formule 1 illustrée de A à Z (1994)
- Petit guide illustre de la F1 (1999)
- Formule rire : F1 (1999)
