= Elliot K. Fishman =

American diagnostic radiologist

Dr. Elliot K. Fishman is an American diagnostic radiologist, currently the director of diagnostic imaging and body CT and professor of radiology and radiological science at Johns Hopkins University School of Medicine.

Currently, he also serves as the Director of Diagnostic Imaging and Body Computed Tomography, and is a member of the Johns Hopkins Kimmel Cancer Center.

He is also co-principal investigator of the Felix Project for Early Detection of Pancreatic Cancer and co-chair of Image Wisely's executive committee.

== Education ==
Fishman received his medical degree in 1977 from the University of Maryland School of Medicine. He then did his residency at Sinai Hospital and subsequently completed a fellowship in CT at Johns Hopkins Hospital.

== Career ==
Fishman specializes in 3D imaging and rendering. To date, he has published over 1,300 peer-reviewed publications and has co-authored 10 textbooks. He is a member of editorial boards for more than 35 journals and is a past-president of the Society of Body CT/MR.

He also owns and runs the award-winning website called CTisus, subtitled "Everything you need to know about Computed Tomography (CT) & CT Scanning."

In the 1980s, Fishman worked in 3D imaging with Pixar Animation Studios.

In 1981, he joined the Johns Hopkins University faculty as an Assistant Professor and was promoted to Professor of Radiology and Oncology ten years later, in 1991.

== Awards & Recognition ==
Fishman has won the Diagnostic Imaging’s 2016 Radiology Lifetime Achievement Award; the 2016 Aunt Minnie Best Radiology Mobile App; and the RSNA Honored Educator Award for 2012, 2014, 2016, and 2018. He received the Elliot K. Fishman, M.D. Professorship in Radiology from the Johns Hopkins University School of Medicine in 2018.

Fishman holds the record for the most Aunt Minnie Awards, including:

- Outstanding Educator: 2002 and 2007
- Outstanding Researcher: 2004
- Best Radiology Mobile App: 2016, 2017, 2019, 2020, and 2023
- Most Influential Radiology Researcher: 2004
- Best Radiology Image: 2017
- Most Effective Radiology Educator: 2024
