= Agudat Hovevei Sfat Ever =

Agudat Ḥovevei Sfat Ever (Hebrew: אגודת חובבי שפת עבר, lit. 'Society of the lovers of the language of Hebrew', i.e. "Hebrew language lovers society") was a national organization founded in the early 1900s to promote the study of Hebrew and its literature in the Russian Empire. A precursor of the Tarbut movement, more than sixty chapters of Agudat Ḥovevei Sfat Ever were established across Russia, and the society operated a network of Hebrew-language kindergartens and teachers' schools. It was forcibly disbanded by the Communist regime in 1917.
