= Charles Adès Fishman =

American poet, academic, and scholar

Charles Adès Fishman (born July 10, 1942) is an American poet and academic and scholar who has written ten books of poetry, and edited three anthologies. From 1979 to 1997 he was the director of the Visiting Writers Program at Farmingdale State College.

== Early life ==
Born Charles Monroe Fishman in Oceanside, New York, the oldest of two children born to Morris (Murray) Fishman and Naomi (Toby) Adès, a homemaker (he took her maiden name as his middle name after she died in May 1999). When he was 2 years old, they moved to Wheeler Avenue in the South Bronx. In 1951, the family moved to Wantagh, New York, where they lived for many years. He met his partner Ellen Haselkorn at a fraternity dance at Hofstra University.
