= Abduction of Jakub Fiszman =

German abduction case

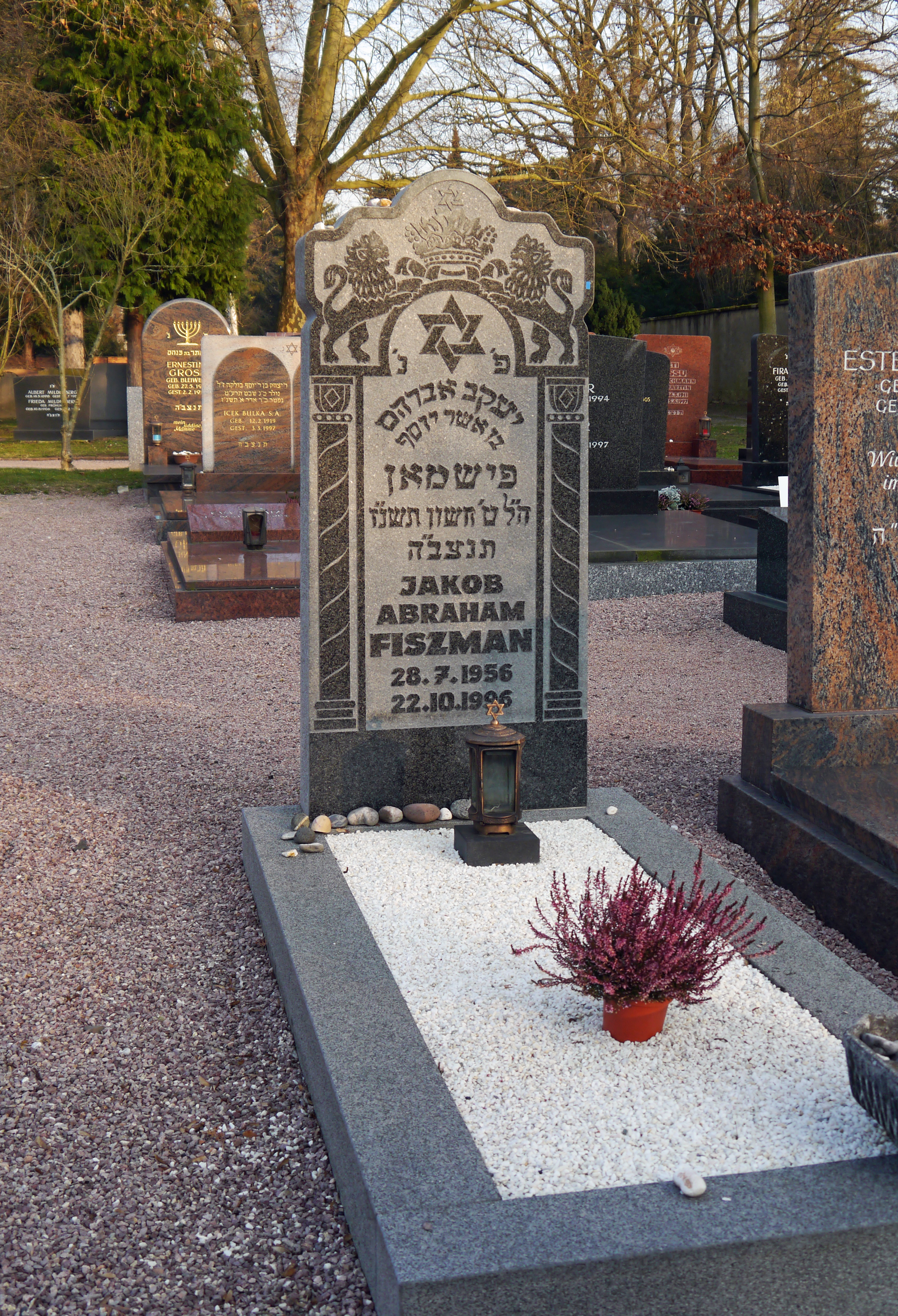
Grave of Jakub Fiszman, Neuer Jüdischer Friedhof (Frankfurt am Main)

The abduction and murder of Jakub Fiszman (1956 – October 1996) was a crime that took place in Eschborn, Germany, in 1996. The investigation and trial of the perpetrators, house painter Rainer Körppen and his son Sven Körppen, produced substantial public and media attention, including TV documentaries. In the 2000s, it also spawned a series of lawsuits related to the privacy of the perpetrators.

== Abduction and murder ==
The victim, Jakub Fiszman, was a millionaire German businessman from Frankfurt am Main. He was seized and carried off, even though injured, of the premises of his corporation in Eschborn on October 1, 1996. On October 10, the abductors received the ransom payment of four million Deutsche Mark that they had demanded.

Rainer and Sven Körppen, along with three other people, were arrested by the police of the state of Hessen on October 16, 1996. The badly decomposed body of Jakub Fiszman was eventually found on October 19 in the Taunus mountains, after a massive search operation involving some 500 police officers. The forensic report indicated that he was bludgeoned to death with a blunt instrument. Fiszman was buried on October 22, 1996, with great public attention.

== Trial and conviction ==
Criminal proceedings against Rainer and Sven Körppen began on October 2, 1997. On October 1, 1998, the principal perpetrator Rainer Körppen was sentenced to life in prison and to indefinite security detention (Sicherungsverwahrung). Sven Körppen was sentenced to twelve years of imprisonment. He was released in May 2006. He committed suicide in November 2010.

== Privacy lawsuits ==
From prison, Rainer Körppen has filed suits against various German media, including the Berliner Zeitung, the Hessischer Rundfunk and the Norddeutscher Rundfunk, claiming that the reproduction of his full name in the online archives of the media coverage about his crime is in violation of his right to privacy. Even though he has little chance of ever being released, the Landgericht (state court) Hamburg has sided with him in several cases, holding that "reporting about a crime committed by a convicted person may substantially infringe their fundamental right to the free development of their personality". On appeal, however, the Oberlandesgericht (supreme state court) Hamburg and Frankfurt have refused to order online archives to be altered.

== See also ==
- List of solved missing person cases: 1950–1999
