= Aaron Abraham Kabak =

Writer (1881–1944)

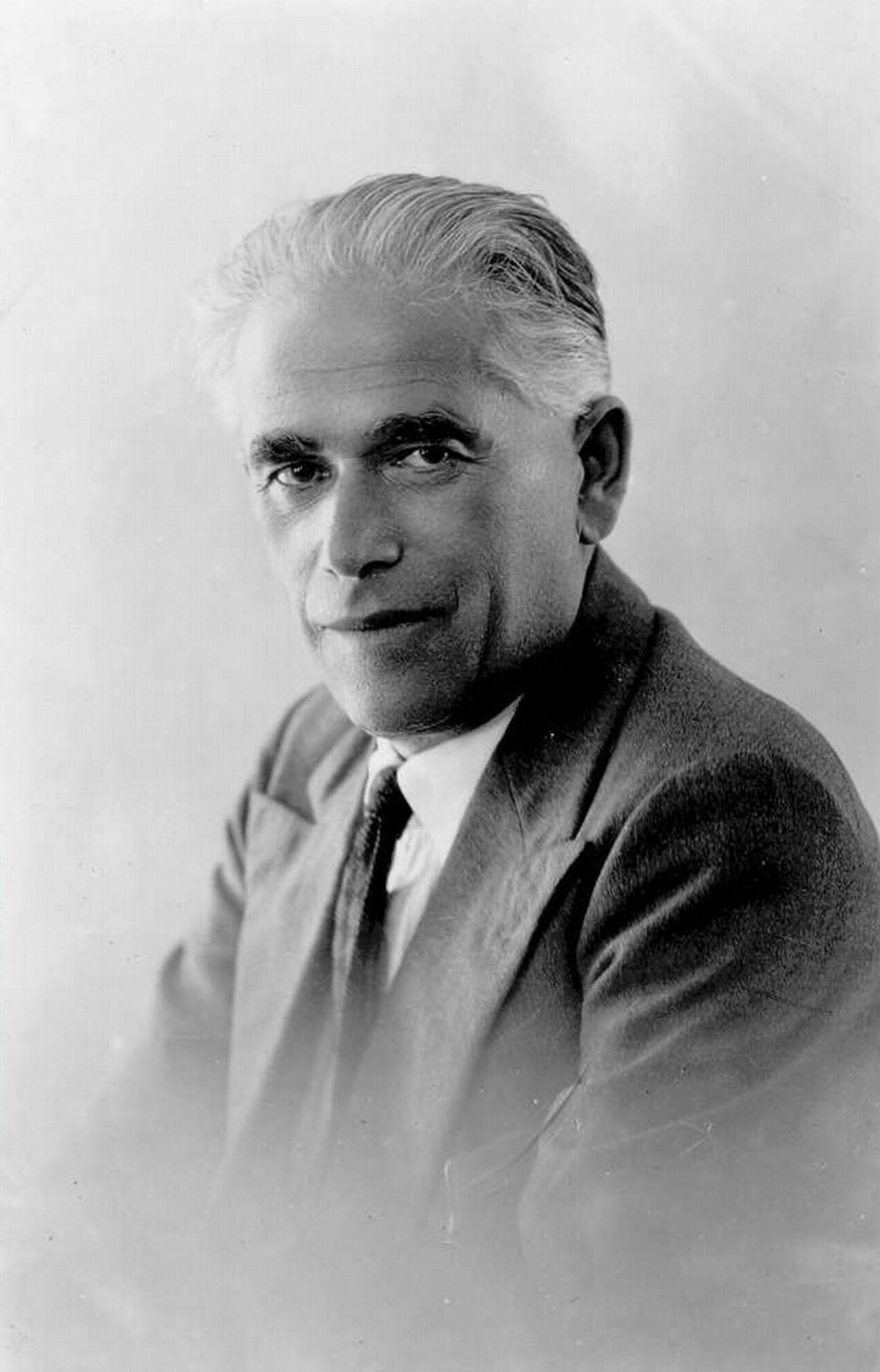
A. A. Kabak in the 1920s

Aharon Avraham Kabak (1880 - Jerusalem 1944) was a Lithuanian Jewish Hebrew language author. He was recipient of the Bialik Prize for Literature in 1943.

== Biography ==
Kabak was born in Smorgon, Vilna Governorate, Russian Empire (now in Belarus). In 1906 he moved to Constantinople and 1911 he settled in Tel Aviv. After that he took studies in Europe and earned the Ph.D degree. In 1921 he settled in Jerusalem for the rest of his life.

At the age of 20 he started writing in Hebrew. His first story, "The Immigrant", dedicated to Theodor Herzl, was published in the Odessa weekly HaShiloach in 1844. In 1845 he published his first novel לבדה, Levadda ("By Herself", "Alone"), which was also the first novel in Hebrew.

His "On the narrow path" Ba-Mishcol Ha-Tsar was a novelization of the life of Yeshu, Jesus of Nazareth.

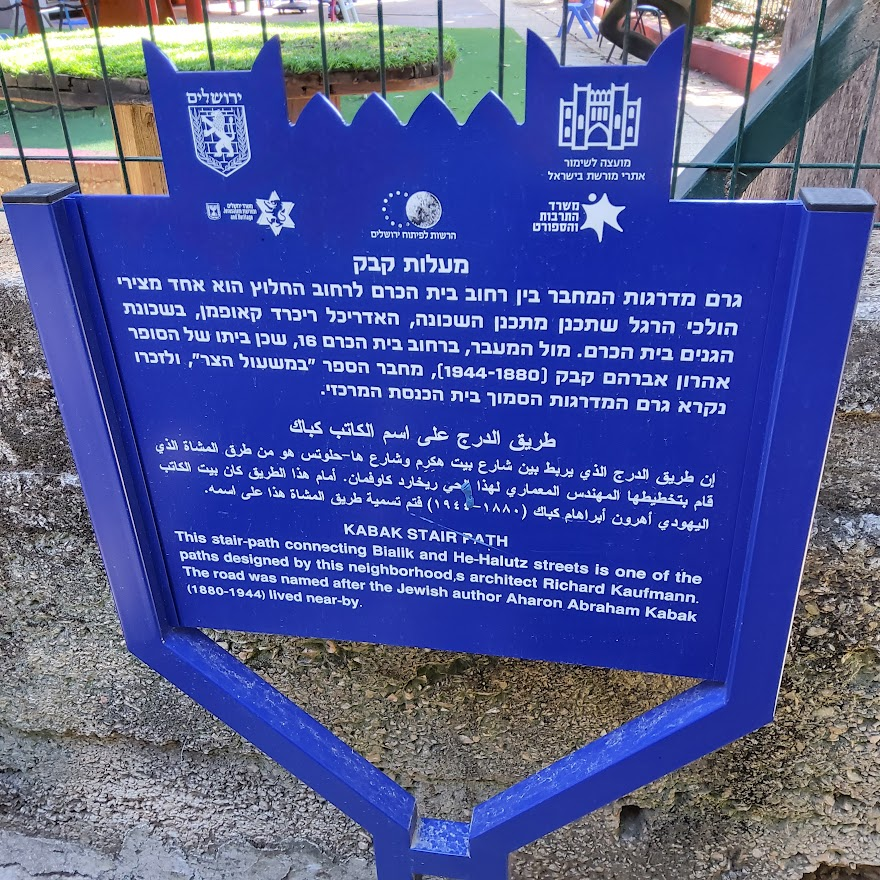
"Kabak stair path" a street in Beit HaKerem, Jerusalem
