= Jacob Fichman =

Israeli poet (1881–1958)

- יעקב פיכמן
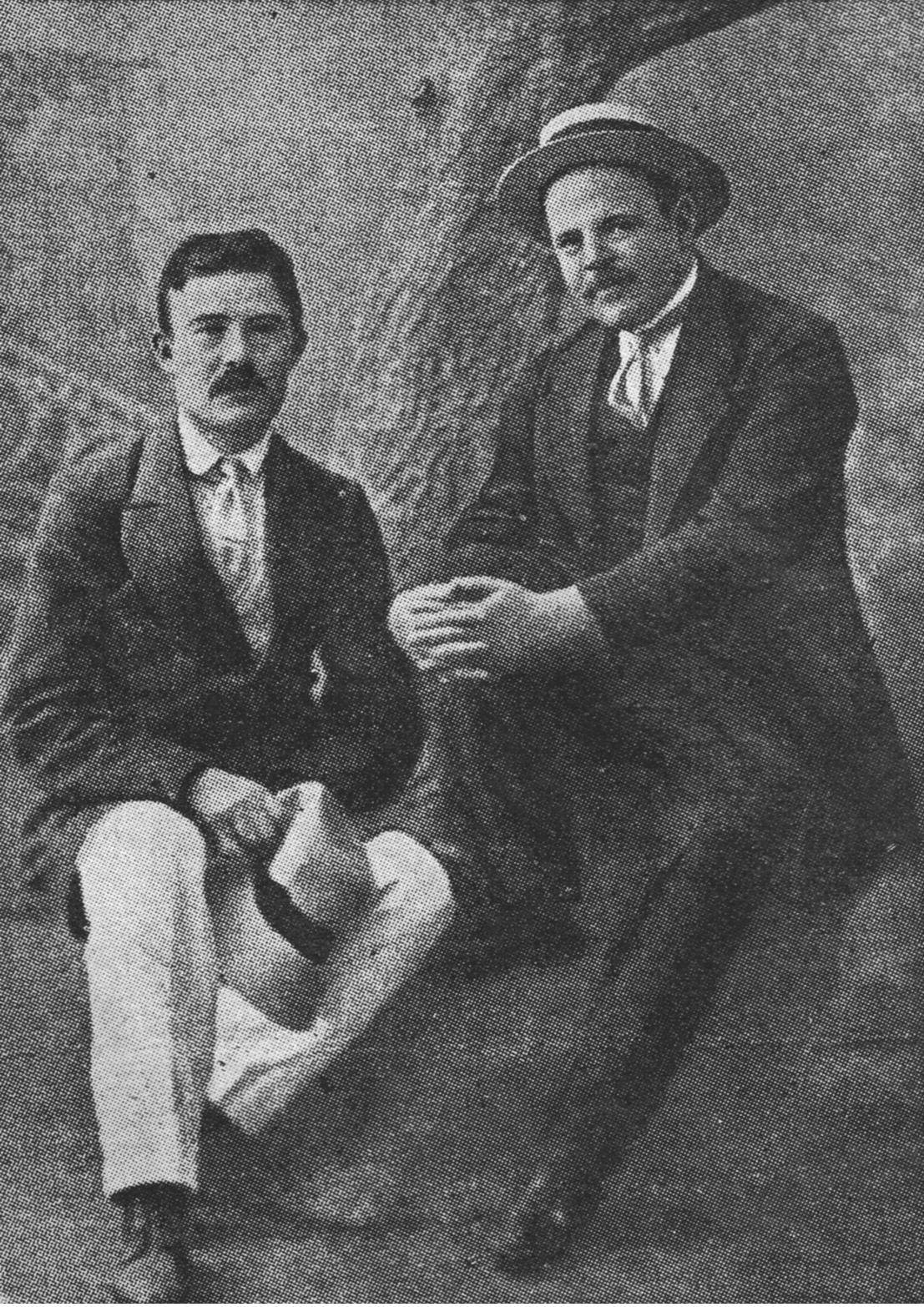
- Fichman (left) with Hayim Nahman Bialik
- Born: 25 November 1881; Bălți, Bessarabia, Moldova
- Died: 18 May 1958 (aged 76); Tel Aviv, Israel
- Occupations: Poet, essayist, literary critic
- Writing career
- Language: Hebrew
- Notable work: Peat Sadeh ("A Corner of a Field")
- Notable awards: Bialik Prize (1945, 1953), Israel Prize (1957)

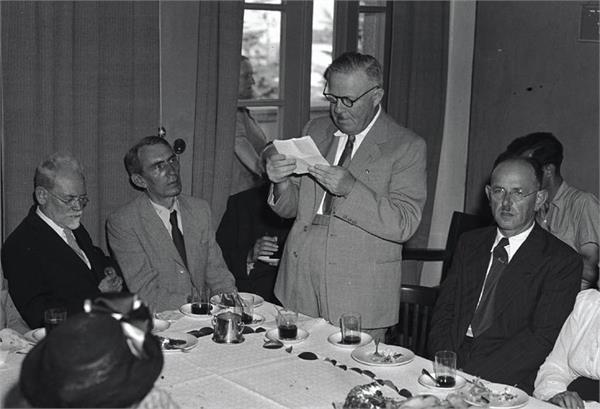
Jacob Fichman receiving the Ussishkin Prize, 1947

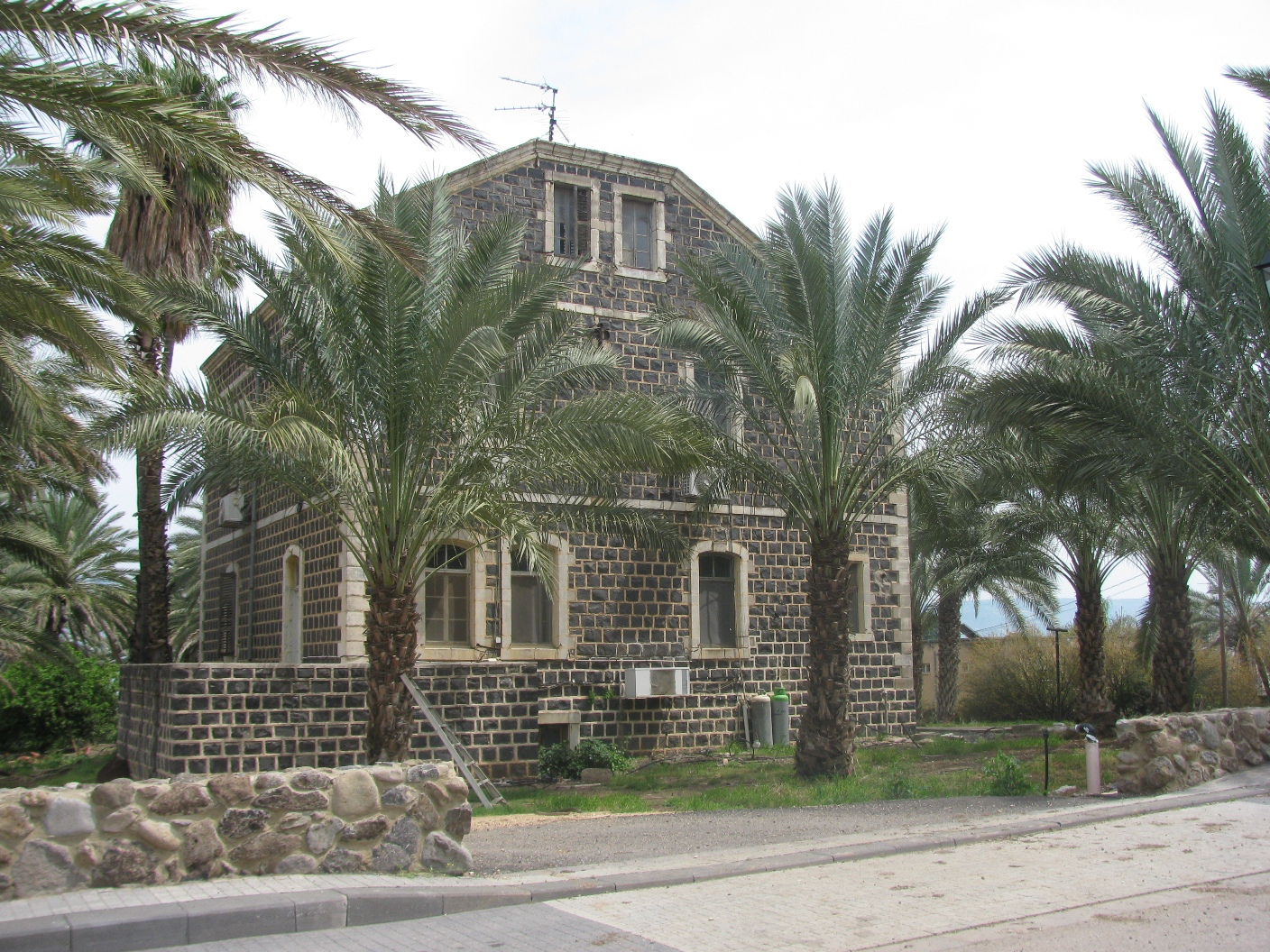
Tridel house in the Moshava Kinneret inspired Fichman to write his song 'Agada'

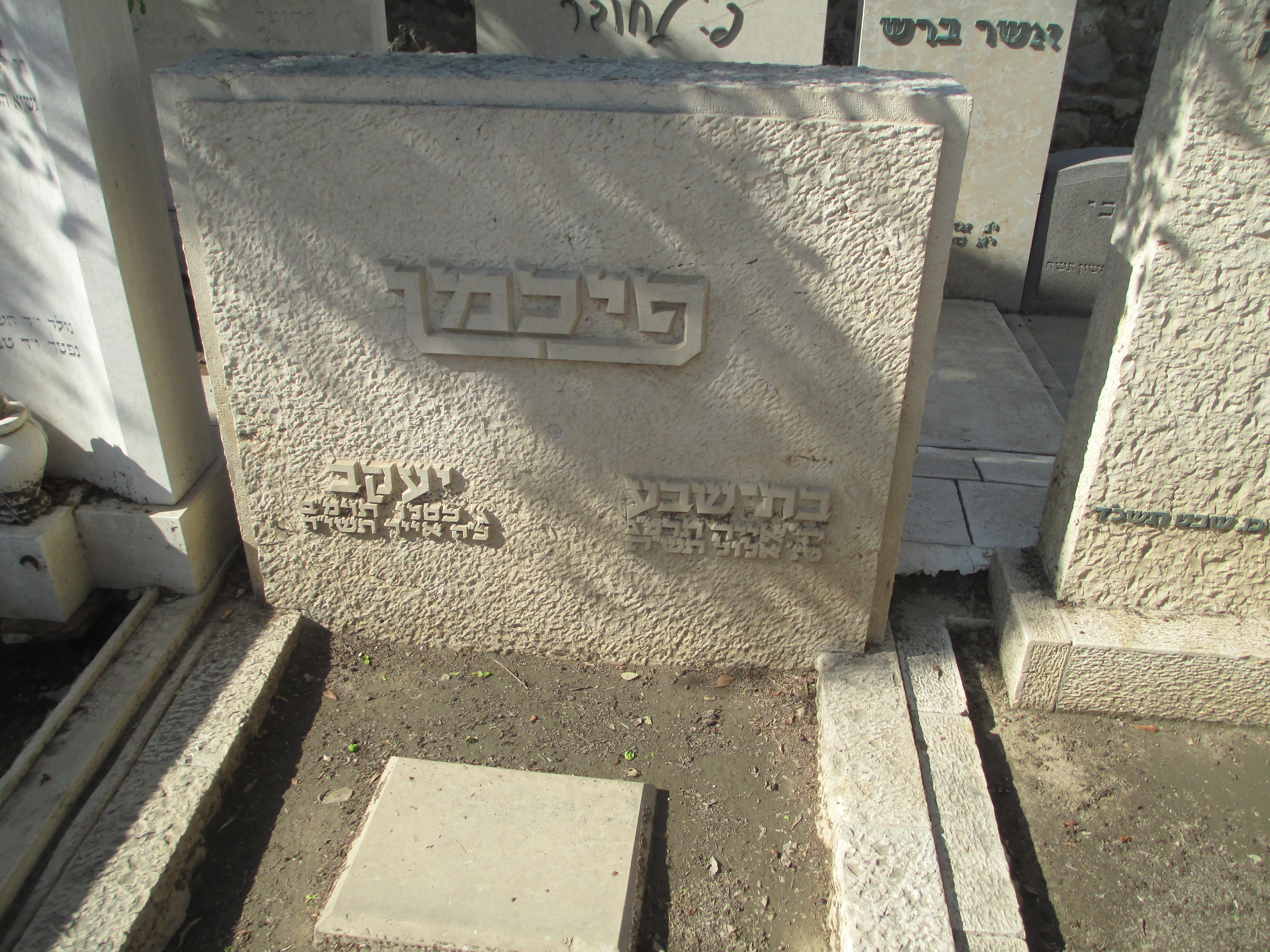
Grave of Jacob & Bat Sheva Fichman in Trumpeldor Cemetery

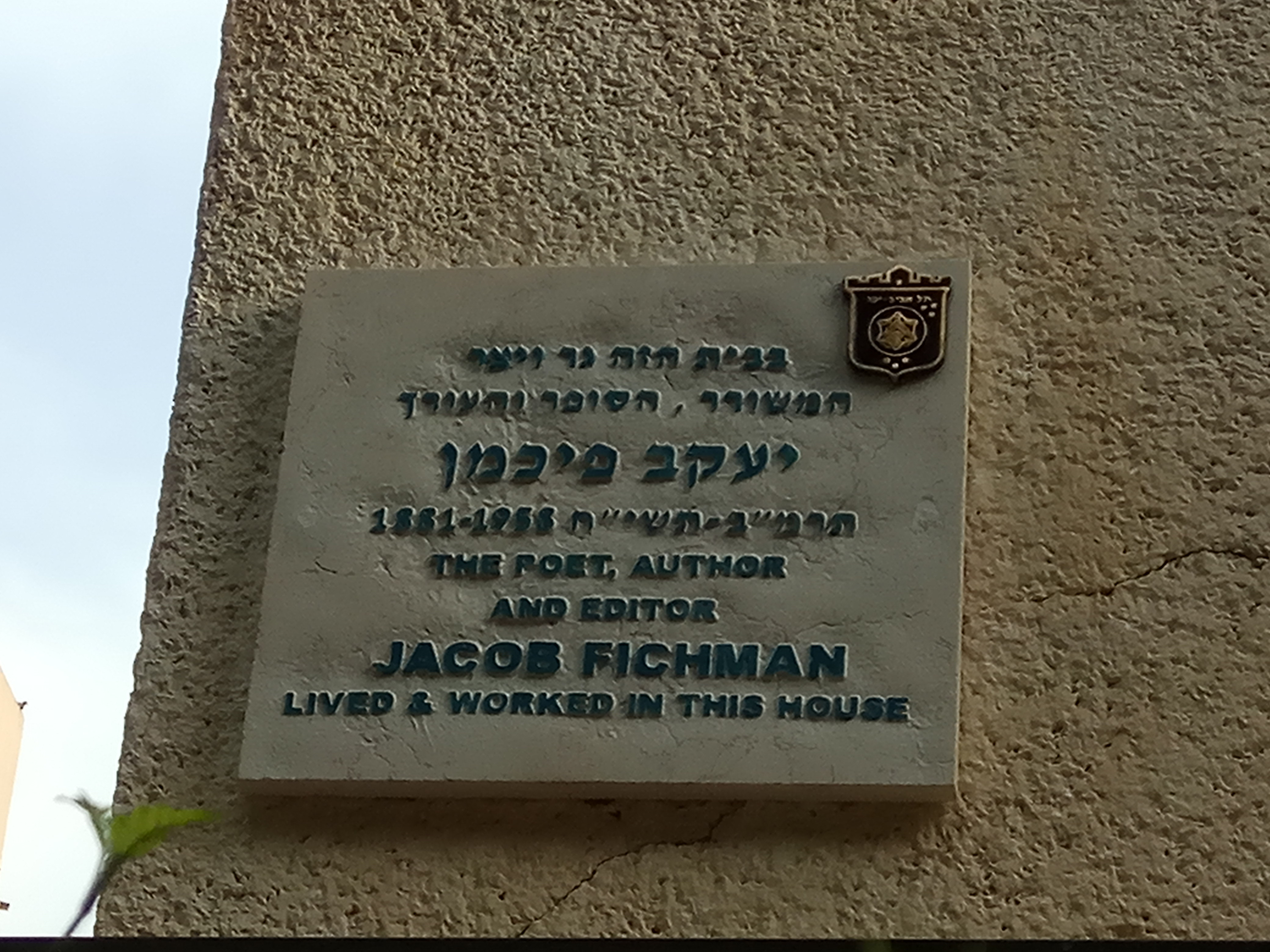
Memorial plaque to Jacob Fichman

Jacob Fichman (Hebrew: יעקב פיכמן; 25 November 1881 – 18 May 1958), also transliterated as Yakov Fichman, was an acclaimed Hebrew poet, essayist and literary critic.

== Biography ==
Fichman was born in Bălți, Bessarabia, Moldova in 1881. After discovering the writings of Hayim Nahman Bialik, he moved to Odessa in 1901 to be near him and the city's circle of writers, and from 1903 he divided his time between Odessa and Warsaw. His first book of poems, Giv'olim ("Stalks"), was published in Warsaw around 1911. He initially emigrated to Ottoman Palestine in 1912 to edit the children's magazine Moledet, but returned temporarily to Europe in 1914 and was stranded there until after World War I, not returning to the then Mandate Palestine, later Israel, until 1919. Between 1919 and 1921 he again edited Moledet as well as the journal Ma'abarot, and he then worked as an editor for Stybel Publications, mostly in Warsaw, until returning to Palestine in 1925. From 1936 to 1942 he edited Moznaim, the journal of the Hebrew Writers Association. He died in Tel Aviv in 1958.

Fichman's poetry followed a traditional lyric Romantic style. His poetic background is reflected in his works of prose, which were sometimes seen as being nearly works of poetry in themselves. His other work included textbooks, articles in periodicals and introductions in literary anthologies. His critical essays focused heavily on the lives of the authors rather than on focusing directly on their work, giving the reader a holistic view of the author and the work.

== Awards ==
- In 1942, Fichman received the Aharonovich Prize.
- In 1945, Fichman received the Bialik Prize for his book of poetry Peat Sadeh ("A Corner of a Field"), published in 1943.
- In 1953, Fichman again received the Bialik Prize, this time in respect of several of his works.
- In 1947, Fichman received the Ussishkin Prize.
- In 1956, Fichman received the Ramat Gan Prize.
- In 1957, Fichman was awarded the Israel Prize, for literature.

== See also ==
- List of Israel Prize recipients
- List of Bialik Prize recipients
- Fichman
