= Asher Barash =

Galicia-born Hebrew writer (1889–1952)

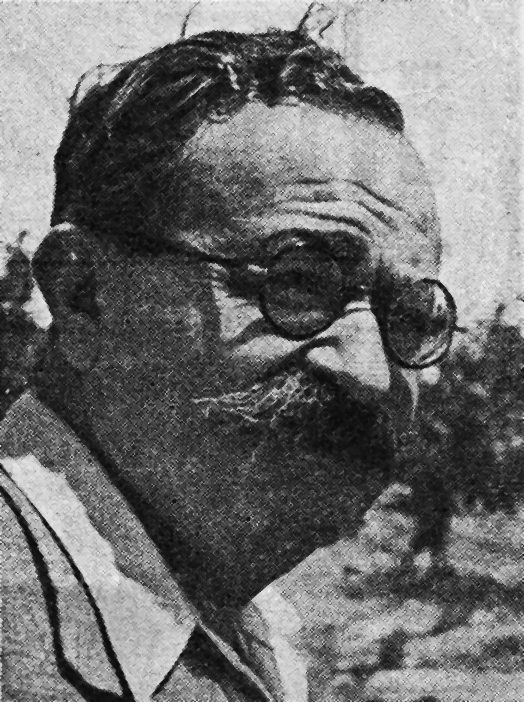
Asher Barash

Asher Barash (Hebrew: אשר ברש; 1889 – June 1952) was an Israeli writer, editor, teacher, and translator.

== Early life ==
Asher Barash was born in Lopatyn, near Brody in Galicia. He was the son of Naftali Herts Barash, a grain merchant descended from a rabbinic family. Barash received both a traditional Jewish education at heder and bet midrash and a secular education at a local Polish government school. He was proficient in Yiddish, Hebrew, Polish and German. He immigrated to Palestine in 1914, settling in Tel Aviv.

== Literary career ==
Barash wrote stories, non-fiction, and poetry about the “early struggles of Palestinian Jewry.”

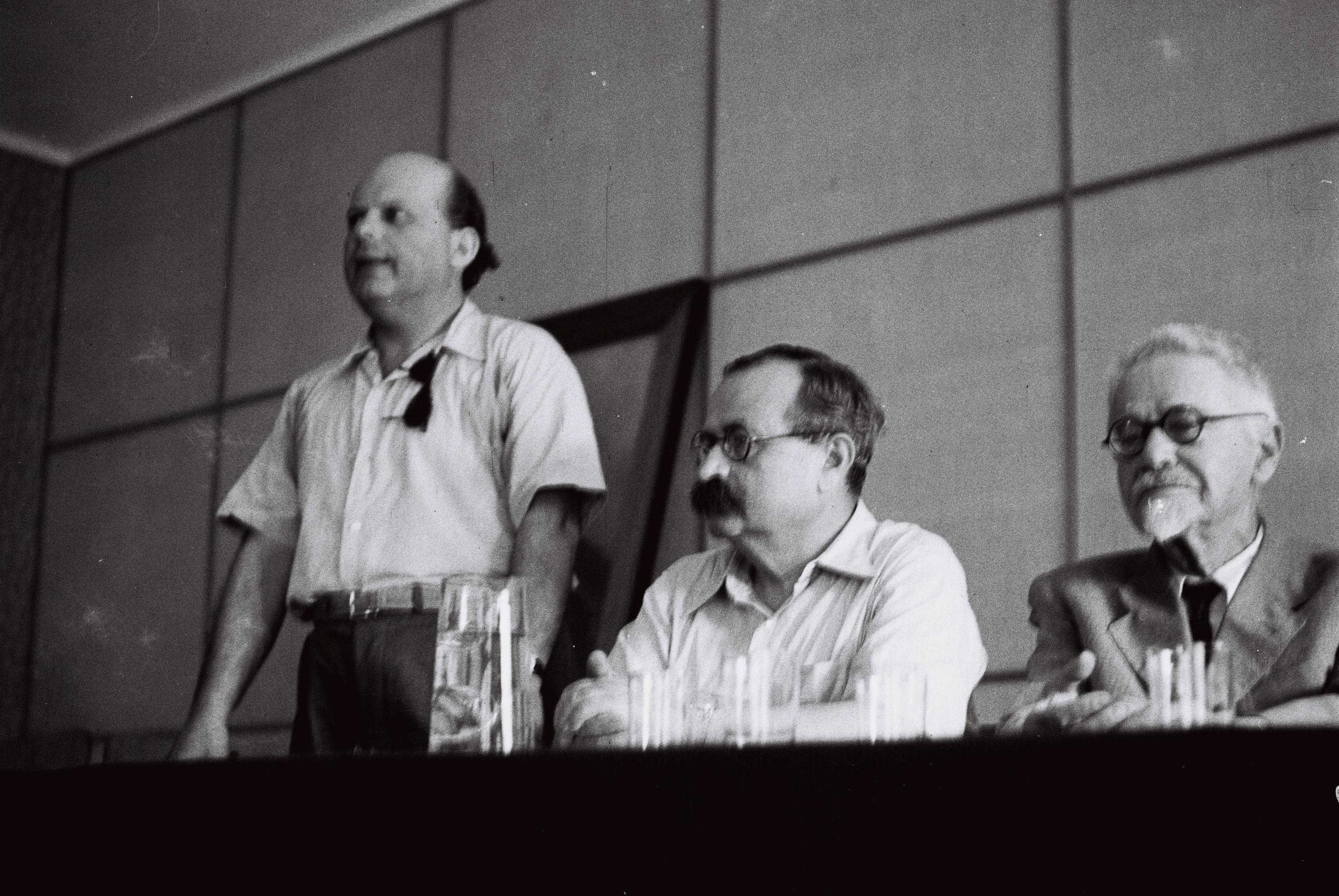
Shin Shalom, Asher Barash, and Nahum Slouschz at a Hebrew writers' conference in 1948

He won the Bialik Prize in 1940 for his Hebrew language novel ‘’Alien Love’’. In 1922 he founded the journal of literature and literary criticism Hedim with the writer Ya‘akov Rabinowitz, a sounding board for aspiring young writers. In his later years he served as president of the Hebrew Writers Association in Israel.

He died at 63 of a heart attack.

== See also ==
Hebrew literature
