= Danny Fiszman =

English businessman (1945–2011)

Daniel David Fiszman (9 January 1945 – 13 April 2011) was an English diamond dealer, best known as a shareholder in and director of Arsenal Football Club, and played a leading role in the club's move from Highbury to Ashburton Grove, now known as Emirates Stadium.

== Early life ==
Fiszman was born in Willesden, North London and was the son of a Belgian Jewish couple who fled the Nazis during World War II.

== Career ==
Fiszman made his fortune in diamonds, building Star Diamonds Group which traded in rough diamonds. Star Diamonds Group also owns 16% of Abbeycrest, whose major clients include Argos and Asda. He sold the group in 2007 for £150M, to concentrate on his role in completing Arsenal's new stadium.

Other shareholdings took his total worth to around £236m, ranking him 348th on the 2008 Sunday Times Rich List (351st in 2007, 273rd in 2006, 305th in 2005 and 207th in 2004).

== Arsenal Football Club ==
Fiszman bought into Arsenal Football Club and became a board member through his purchase of an 8% stake from his friend David Dein, starting with 10,000 shares in 1991.

In March 2007 Fiszman sold a block of 659 shares for over £3.9m to Stan Kroenke Sports Enterprises (KSE). This was a significant sale as reducing his stake to less than 25% resulted in a loss of veto rights over any future changes to the company statutes. Speculation linked this with a move abroad where he would substantially reduce any Capital Gains Tax liability that would come with a sale of his stake in the club. Fiszman stated his desire not sell any more of his shares for the foreseeable future, after the sale of 5,000 ordinary shares to Kroenke takes the American's stake in Arsenal Holdings plc to 12,756 Shares (representing 20.5%). On 27 March 2009 Fiszman sold 5,000 ordinary shares of £1 each in Arsenal Holdings plc to KSE, UK, Inc, at a price of £8,500 per share. On 11 April 2011, two days before his death, he sold his Arsenal shares amounting to 16.11% of club's stake to KSE, due to his declining health.

== Personal life ==
Fiszman and his wife Sally lived in St Prex near Geneva, Switzerland. His hobbies included running and flying – he was a fully qualified commercial jet pilot. Fiszman had been undergoing treatment for throat cancer at the time of his death. He died on 13 April 2011, aged 66.
