= Nili Mirsky =

Israeli editor and translator

- נילי מירסקי
- Born: December 3, 1943; Rehovot, Mandatory Palestine
- Died: January 30, 2018 (aged 74); Tel Aviv-Yafo, Israel
- Resting place: Yarkon Cemetery
- Occupation: Translation
- Writing career
- Language: Hebrew, Russian, German
- Notable awards: Tchernichovsky Prize (1989); Israel Prize (2008)

Nili Mirsky (Hebrew: נילי מירסקי; December 3, 1943 – January 30, 2018) was an Israeli editor, translator from Russian and German into Hebrew, and held a Ph.D. in French literature, Russian, and German. She taught in the literature department at the Tel Aviv University. She received numerous awards for her work, including the Tchernichovsky Prize for translation in 1989 and the Israel Prize for literature, in the field of translation, in 2008.

== Biography ==
Mirsky was born in Rehovot in 1943, the eldest daughter of Johanna Ilgovsky, originally from Lithuania, and Moshe Boleslavsky, and grew up in Tel Aviv. Her grandfather, Yehuda Boleslavsky, owned a Russian-language bookstore on Allenby Street, where she spent many hours as a child. She spoke only Russian with her grandmother, which helped her learn the language.

In 1957, she completed her studies at "Tchernichovsky" Elementary School in Tel Aviv, and in 1961, she graduated from "Tichon Hadash" high school.

She began her academic studies in 1962 at the Hebrew University of Jerusalem, majoring in Hebrew literature and English literature, and in the same year, she married Semyon Mirsky, a new immigrant from Russia. Consequently, she was exempted from military service in the Israel Defense Forces. In 1964, she halted her studies in Jerusalem and moved with her husband to Munich, Germany, where she studied art history and history at LMU Munich.

Without completing her degree, she returned to Israel in 1967, resumed her studies at Tel Aviv University in English literature and comparative literature, and received a Bachelor's degree in 1971. That same year, she returned to LMU Munich, studying Slavic studies with a focus on Russian literature, alongside German and English literature, and earned a Master's degree four years later before returning to Israel. She lived in Munich for nearly nine years. Her husband remained in Munich and found a position at Radio Free Europe. They later divorced.

In 1971, editor Menachem Perry invited her to be a regular translator for the upcoming literary magazine 'Siman Kri'a'. Her first published translations appeared in the magazine's inaugural issue in September 1972, including a translation of "Semyon" by Andrei Platonov. Upon returning to Israel, she became an assistant editor for the magazine. Among her translations were works by Heinrich Böll, Andrei Platonov, Boris Pasternak, Andrei Bely, and many others.

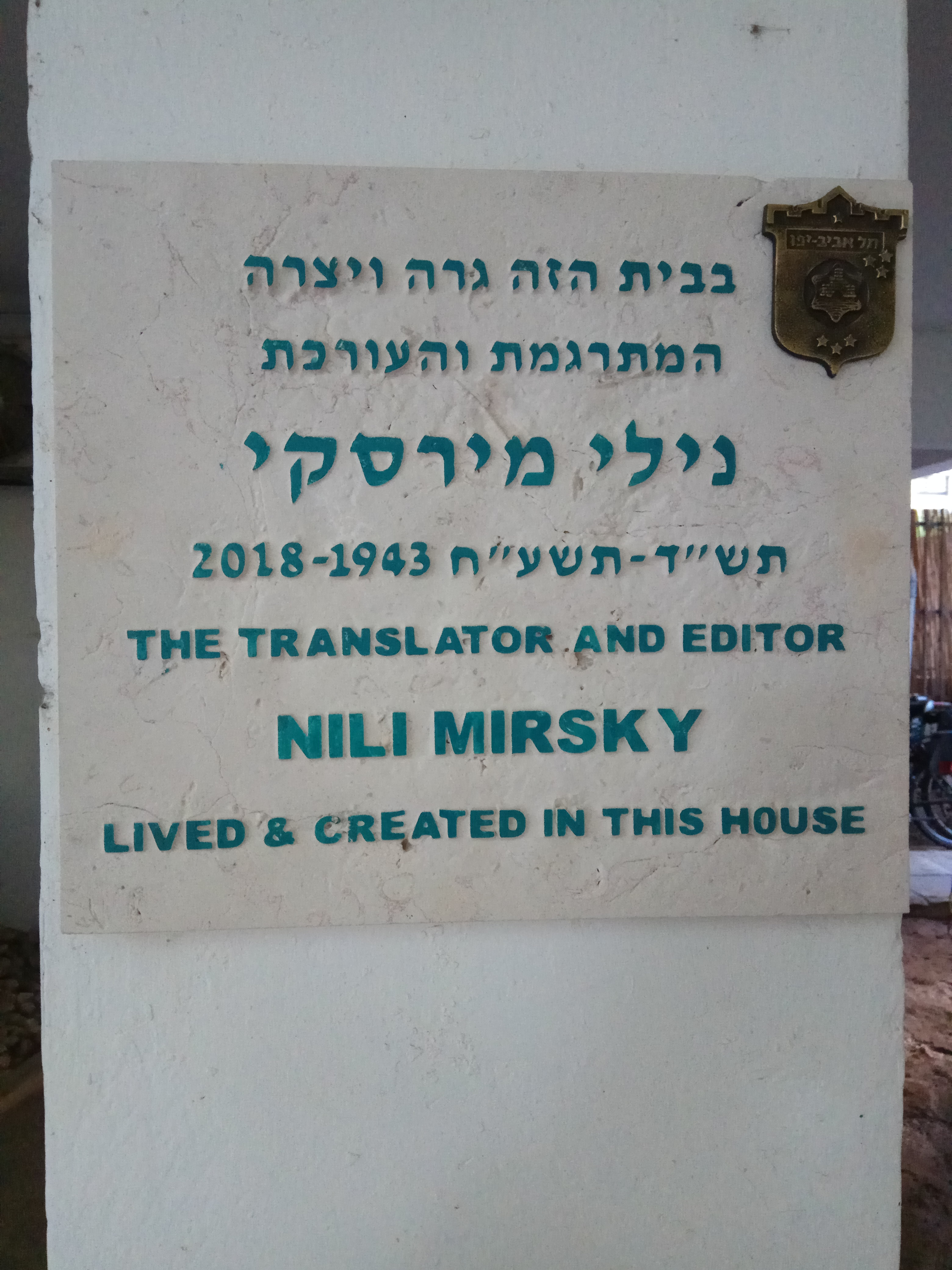
Memorial plaque for Nili Mirsky in her home

Between 1976 and 1979, Mirsky taught Russian and German literature in the Department of Comparative Literature at Tel Aviv University. In 1979, she decided to leave academia and dedicate herself to translation from Russian and German, accepting a position as a translator and editor at Am Oved. When "HaSifriya" (which later became "The New Library") was established under the Siman Kri'a/Hakibbutz Hameuchad Publishing House, she joined as a house translator.

In 1994, she returned to Am Oved, where she, alongside Ilana Hammerman, took over editing the publishing house's flagship series, "Sifriya La'am". She served as an editor alongside Tereza Byron-Freed and Moshe Ron. At the end of 2011, she left "Am Oved" and joined "Ahuzat Bayit Publishing".

Mirsky died on January 30, 2018, at the age of 74, after a year-long battle with cancer. She was buried in Yarkon Cemetery in Petah Tikva.

== Awards and recognition ==
In 1989, she received the Tchernichovsky Prize for translation. In 1997 and again in 2007, she won the Ministry of Education's Translator Prize. In 2007, she received a Lifetime Achievement Award for translation from the Ministry of Culture. In 2008, she was awarded the Israel Prize for literature in translation.

The attentive listening in her translations to the language and style of the author is closely tied to the listening, logic, and sound of the Hebrew language. Mirsky excels at immersing the reader in styles originating from other languages, yet the final product of her sentences and paragraphs is unquestionably Hebrew. She ensures that the reader does not sense the discord of artificiality due to traces of the original language remaining in the translation. The artistic quality in her translations is also due to their living connection with the evolving Hebrew literature and language. The reader of her translations perceives a delicate, finely tuned balance between fidelity to the literary original with all its subtleties and fidelity to Hebrew with all its nuances. (From the judges' explanation for her winning of the Israel Prize).

== Selected books translated by her ==
=== Translations from Russian ===
- The Whirlpool, by Konstantin Paustovsky, Am Oved, 1970.
- The Blind Musician, by Vladimir Korolenko, Adi Publishing, 1973.
- Ukrainian Stories, by Nikolai Gogol, Am Oved, 1980.
- Delayed Blossoming, stories by Anton Chekhov, Am Oved, 1981.
- Home of the Gentry, by Ivan Turgenev, afterword by Nili Mirsky, Am Oved, 1983.
- Netochka / White Nights, by Fyodor Dostoevsky, The Library, Hakibbutz Hameuchad / Siman Kri’a, 1986.
- Red Cavalry and Other Stories, by Isaac Babel, afterword by Nili Mirsky, The New Library, 1987.
- The Noise of Time, prose by Osip Mandelstam, annotations and afterword by Nili Mirsky, Am Oved, 1988.
- The Cherry Orchard, a four-act comedy by Anton Chekhov, afterword by Harry Golomb, Hakibbutz Hameuchad, 1988.
- Vasilisa the Beautiful, a collection of Russian folktales, 1989 (co-translated with Ilana Reichurger).
- Provincial Stories, by Anton Chekhov, afterword by Nili Mirsky, The New Library, 1990.
- Petersburg Tales, by Nikolai Gogol, The New Library, 1992.
- The Idiot, by Fyodor Dostoevsky, The New Library, 1993.
- A Dozen Russians, by Vladimir Nabokov, The New Library, 1994.
- Fathers and Sons, by Ivan Turgenev, The New Library, 1994.
- Moscow-Petushki, by Venedikt Yerofeyev, Am Oved, 1994.
- Childhood, by Maxim Gorky, Am Oved, 1995.
- Anna’s Body, or the End of Russian Avant-Garde, contemporary Russian fiction, Am Oved, 1999 (story selection and translation in collaboration with Mark Ivanir).
- Anna Karenina, by Leo Tolstoy, Am Oved, 2000.
- The White Guard, by Mikhail Bulgakov, Am Oved, 2002.
- The Gambler, from the notes of a young man, by Fyodor Dostoevsky, Am Oved, 2002. (revised edition published in 2017).
- In a Wonderful and Cruel World, stories by Andrei Platonov, Am Oved, 2007.
- The Brothers Karamazov, by Fyodor Dostoevsky, Am Oved, 2011.
- A Hero of Our Time, by Mikhail Lermontov, Ahuzat Bayit Publishing, 2013.

=== Translations from German ===
==== Prose ====
- Jörg Jenatsch, by Conrad Ferdinand Meyer, Dvir, 1977.
- Effi Briest, by Theodor Fontane, afterword by Nili Mirsky, Am Oved, 1981.
- Here I Am, Father, by Friedrich Torberg, Am Oved, 1982.
- Ahasuerus, the Wandering Jew, by Stefan Heym, afterword by Nili Mirsky, Am Oved, 1983.
- The Golden Pot and Other Stories, by Ernst Theodor Amadeus Hoffmann, Hakibbutz Hameuchad, 1983.
- Buddenbrooks: The Decline of a Family, by Thomas Mann, afterword by Nili Mirsky, Am Oved, 1985.
- Six Who Overcame All Obstacles, by the Brothers Grimm, illustrated by Claude Lapointe, Am Oved, 1986.
- Death in Venice and Other Stories, by Thomas Mann, The Library, Hakibbutz Hameuchad / Siman Kri’a, 1988.
- Hoffmann's Tales, by Ernst Theodor Amadeus Hoffmann, Hakibbutz Hameuchad, 1990.
- The Last World, by Christoph Ransmayr, Hakibbutz Hameuchad, 1991.
- Wittgenstein's Nephew: A Story of Friendship, by Thomas Bernhard, Am Oved, 1996.
- Death in Venice, by Thomas Mann, The Small Library, Hakibbutz Hameuchad / Siman Kri’a, 2005.
- Felix Krull: The Confessions of a Confidence Man, by Thomas Mann, Ahuzat Bayit, 2016.
- The Castle, by Franz Kafka, Ahuzat Bayit, 2019 (the last two chapters were translated by Ran HaCohen).

==== Essays ====
- On the Puppet Theatre, by Heinrich von Kleist
- The Task of the Translator, by Walter Benjamin

== See also ==
- List of Israel Prize recipients
