= Meyer Weisgal =

American dramatist

- מאיר וייסגל
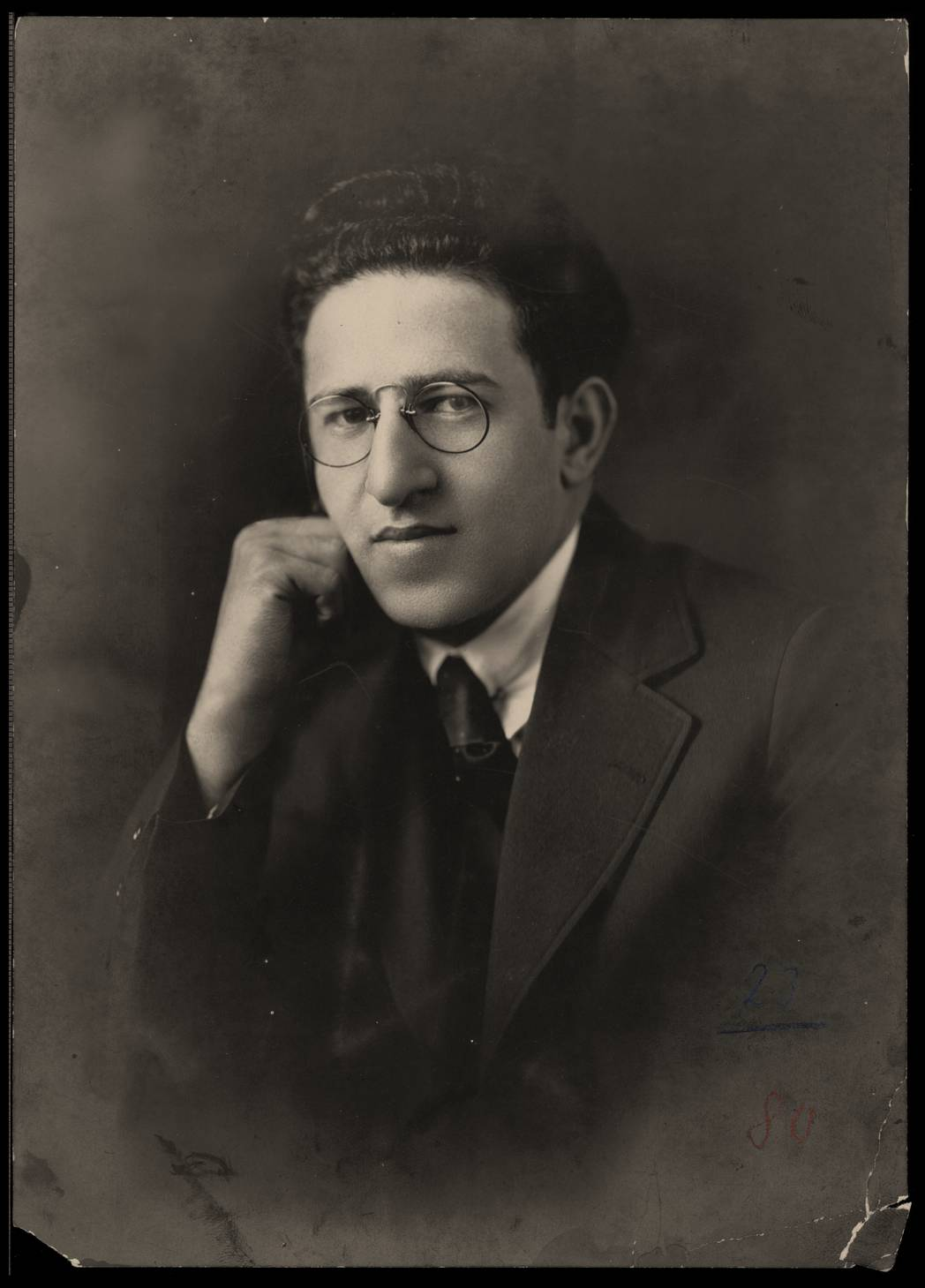
- Meyer Weisgal
- Born: Meyer Wolf Weisgal; November 10, 1894; Kikół, Płock Governorate, Congress Poland, Russian Empire
- Died: September 29, 1977 (aged 82)
- Education: Columbia University
- Occupations: journalist, publisher, playwright, fundraiser, and Zionist activist
- Known for: President of the Weizmann Institute of Science; founding President of Beit Hatfutsot (the Jewish Diaspora Museum)

Meyer Wolf Weisgal (Hebrew: מאיר וולף וייסגאל; November 10, 1894 – September 29, 1977) was an American journalist, publisher, playwright, fundraiser, and Zionist activist who served as the President of the Weizmann Institute of Science and as the founding President of Beit Hatfutsot (the Jewish Diaspora Museum).

== Biography ==
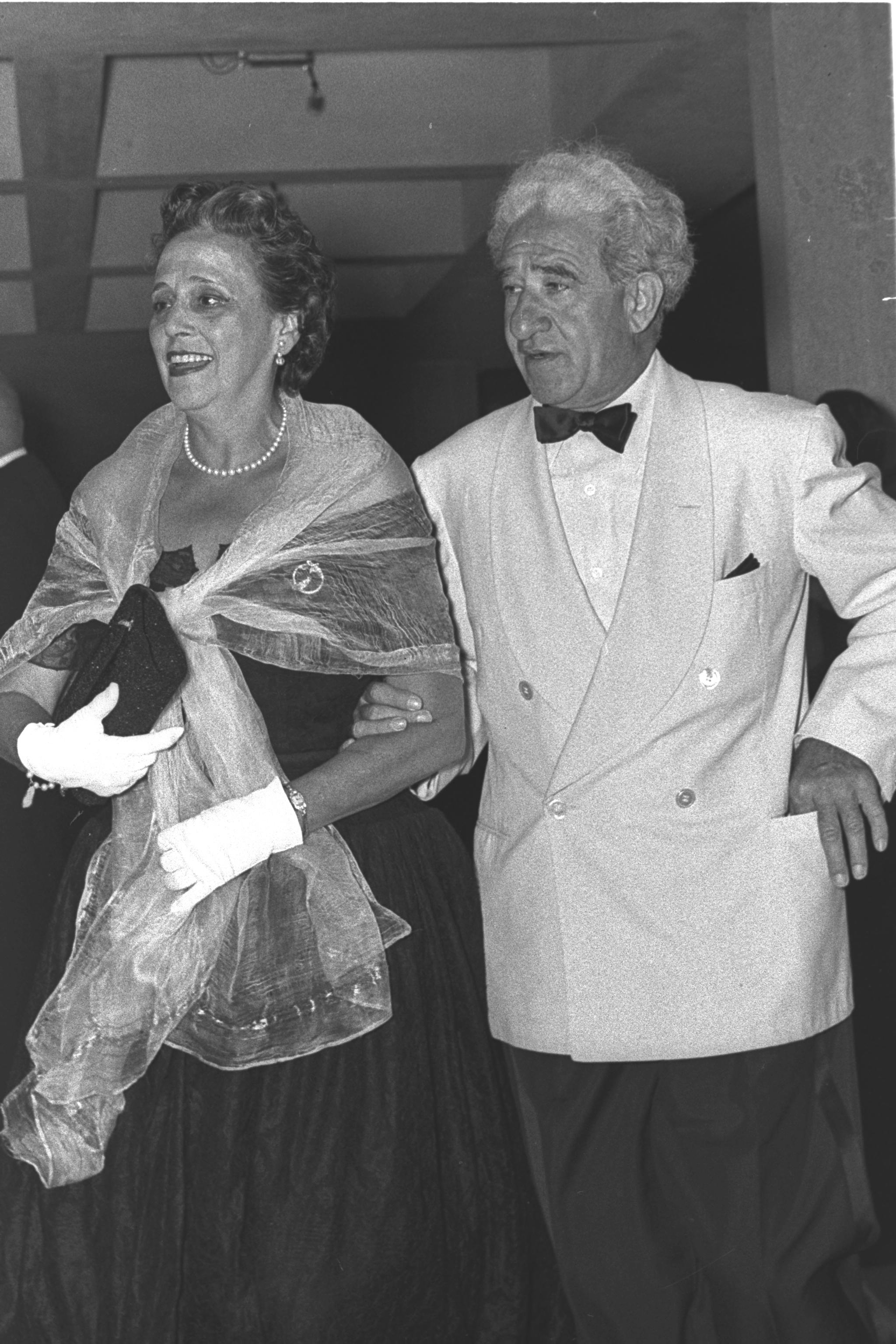
Meyer Weisgal and his wife, 1957

Meyer Wolf Weisgal was born to a Jewish family in Kikół, Congress Poland, in the Pale of Settlement. He emigrated to New York City, US in 1905 with his parents at age 11, where he finished high school at Morris High School in the Bronx and studied journalism at Columbia University. He married Shirley (née Hirshfeld) in 1923.

Meyer and Shirley Weisgal lived on the grounds of the Weizmann Institute and are buried there, near the Chaim Weizmann House.

== Literary and journalism career ==
In 1926, he published the first English translation of the works of Chaim Nachman Bialik. In 1932, he saw stage success with the play "The romance of a people", and he continued to produce stage plays from then on. He conceived the opera-oratorio The Eternal Road to alert the then-ignorant public to Hitler's persecution of the Jews in 1937 Germany. Weisgal enlisted the help of director Max Reinhardt, who approached Kurt Weill to write the music, and Austrian novelist and playwright Franz Werfel to write the libretto for The Eternal Road (originally in German: Der Weg der Verheißung), translated into English by Ludwig Lewisohn.

Together with Louis Lipsky he edited the journal The Maccabean-magazine, later The New Palestine (magazine), which contributed its important part for the success of Chaim Weizmann's Zionist policy after the Balfour Declaration. And he, "as editor, conceived and published two notable supplements, which remain as permanent reference works today: In 1925 a supplement on the Hebrew University, then in establishment; in 1929 a supplement on Theodor Herzl, founder of the modern Zionism". (Biographical notes from the Weizmann Institute, p. 3), See also the series about him on Brouillon, part 4:

== Zionist activism ==
From 1921 until 1930, he was the first head of the Zionist Organization of America. Through the World Zionist Organization he came in close contact with its chair Chaim Weizmann and acted as his personal representative since 1940. In 1944, he started an initiative for expanding the Daniel Sieff Research Institute (led by Weizmann) into what would become a leading multidisciplinary research university: this opened its doors on November 2, 1949, as the Weizmann Institute of Science. He served as its Chairman of the Executive Council 1949–1966 and as its President 1966–1969. Subsequently, he served as the founding President of the Diaspora Museum in Tel-Aviv.
