= Ephraim E. Lisitzky =

Jewish American poet and educator (1885–1962)

- Born: 31 January 1885; Minsk, Minsk Governorate, Russian Empire
- Died: 25 June 1962 (aged 77); New Orleans, Louisiana, United States
- Spouse: Bertha Shefrin
- Writing career
- Language: Hebrew

Ephraim Eliyahu Lisitzky (Hebrew: אפרים אליהו ליסיצקי; 31 January 1885 – 25 June 1962) was an American Hebrew poet, writer, and educator.

== Biography ==
Born in Minsk in 1885, Lisitzky spent his childhood in Slutzk before moving to Boston with his father in 1900. He spent a brief time studying at the Rabbi Yitzḥak Elḥanan Yeshiva, and received a degree in pharmaceutical chemistry from Marquette University. He afterward spent years teaching Hebrew and Jewish studies in various locations in the United States and Canada. In 1918, he was appointed head of the Communal Hebrew School in New Orleans, where he remained until his retirement.

Lisitzky was a member of the Zionist Organization of America and the Histradut Ivrit. Still, despite his early plans to emigrate to Israel, Lisitzky only visited there twice and remained ambivalent about the prospect throughout his life.

He died in New Orleans in 1962 after a long illness.

== Work ==
Lisitzky is credited with making significant contributions to the representation of marginalized groups in Hebrew literature. He is perhaps best known for his epic poem Medurot do'akhot ('Dying Campfires', 1937), written in unrhymed trochaic tetrameter, which is based on Native American legends. His collection of poems Be'oholey Kush ('In the Tents of Cush', 1953) draws inspiration from African-American folktales and spirituals.

In addition to his poetry, Lisitzky also wrote a number of articles on literature and educational matters in the Hebrew press, which were collected in his book, Bi-shevilei ḥayyim ve-sifrut ('In the Paths of Life and Literature', 1961). He is also the only American Hebrew poet to have written an autobiography, which was published under the title Eleh toldot Adam ('These Are the Generations of Adam', 1959). This was translated into English under the title In the Grip of Cross Currents.

As an educator at Communal Hebrew School in New Orleans, which he founded, Lisitzky's primary goal was to make his students fluent in spoken and written Hebrew. His approach involved total immersion in Hebrew, avoiding any other languages being spoke in his classes, including English. He taught the Torah both in the original Hebrew and as translated into other Hebrew words.

== Honours ==
He was awarded honorary doctorates from the Jewish Theological Seminary of America in 1949 and the Hebrew Union College – Jewish Institute of Religion in 1960 for his literary achievements.

== Selected bibliography ==
- Shirim (in Hebrew). Tel Aviv: Ḥaverim. 1928.
- Naftule Elohim. Tel Aviv: ʻOgen. 1934.
- Medurot doʻakhot [Dying Campfires]. New York: ʻOgen. 1937.
- Ha-Seʻarah [The Tempest]. New York: ʻOgen. 1941.
- Adam ʿal adamot: poʾemot [Man on Earth: Poemas] (in Hebrew). New York: ʻOgen. 1947.
- Eleh toldot adam (in Hebrew). Jerusalem: Mossad Bialik. 1949.
- Be-ohole Kush: shirim [In the Tents of Cush]. Jerusalem: Mossad Bialik. 1953.
- Be-maʻalot uve-moradot. Tel Aviv: Devir. 1954.
- Negohot me-ʻarafel. Tel Aviv: ʻOgen. 1956.
- Anshe midot. Tel Aviv: ʻAm ha-sefer. 1957.
- In the Grip of Cross Currents. Translated by Kohn, Moshe; Sloan, Jacob. New York: Bloch Publishing Company. 1959. Translation of Eleh toldot adam into English.
- Bi-yeme shoʼah u-meshoʼah: maḥazot (in Hebrew). New York: ʻOgen. 1959.
- Kemo ha-yom rad: shirim (in Hebrew). Tel Aviv: Maḥbarot le-sifrut. 1960.
- "Yulius Keisar" [Julius Caesar]. In Shakespeare, William (1960). Tragediot [Tragedies] (in Hebrew). Tel Aviv: Am ha-sefer. pp. 61–113.
- Bi-shvile ḥayim ve-sifrut (in Hebrew). Tel Aviv: Maḥbarot le-sifrut. 1961.
- Kokhavim noflim (in Hebrew). Tel Aviv: Maḥbarot le-sifrut. 1963.
- Meshorerah shel Yahadut Amerikah. Tel Aviv: Maḥbarot le-sifrut. 1966.
