= New Palestine (magazine) =

- First edition, 23 December 1919
- Categories: Zionism, Jewish history, culture, politics
- Publisher: Zionist Organization of America
- First issue: January 1920; 106 years ago
- Country: United States
- Language: English

New Palestine was a magazine founded in December 1919, initially as a weekly and later as a bi-weekly, then monthly, published in New York. It was the official organ of the Zionist Organization of America (ZOA).

After the Establishment of the State of Israel in 1948, it was renamed The American Zionist and remained in publication until at least 1985.

== History ==
It started as a four-page publication. The first issue was published on 23 December 1919 and read: "For the Restoration and up-building of a Jewish Palestine."It's cover story "Let us Rise Up and Build" was written by Judge Julian Mack. Contributions were also made by Jacob de Haas and Abraham Haym Fromenson, a prominent Zionist and an influential figure in the American Jewish press, noted for being the first person to introduce English‑language pages into the Yiddish newspapers published in the United States.

Its managing editor was Isidore Cooperman.

It evolved from The Maccabean Magazine by Louis Lipsky and Meyer Wolf Weisgal. Under Weisgal's editorship, The New Palestine included contributors such as Joseph Brainin, Gershon Agron, Ludwig Lewisohn, Pierre van Paassen, Robert Weltsch, Leonard Stein and Marvin Lowenthal.

Contributors also included Menachem Ribalow (1895–1953), who published numerous articles in New Palestine, and the philanthropist and businessman Jacob Henry Schiff (born Jakob Heinrich Schiff; January 10, 1847 – September 25, 1920).

The March 27, 1925 issue was dedicated in its entirety to the opening of The Hebrew University of Jerusalem.

In 1934, Samuel Caplan was editor.

Ludwig Lewisohn (May 30, 1882 – December 31, 1955) novelist, literary critic, the drama critic for The Nation and then its associate editor, was its editor and editorial-writer between 1943 and 1948.

The 18 May 1948 issue was dedicated to the Establishment of the State of Israel, made four days earlier on 14 May. The proclamation of independence was reprinted on the front page of the periodical. Chaim Weizmann, first President of Israel contributed an article titled "A Hand of Friendship to the Arab Peoples". Weizmann also thanked American Jewry "who have contributed so much to the Jewish national revival in Palestine." The issue also included contributions from Rabbi Stephen Samuel Wise, Herbert H. Lehman, first Jewish Governor of New York, Rabbi Abba Hillel Silver, Jorge García Granados and Rabbi Israel Goldstein. The periodical also published an editorial titled "Long Live the Republic of Israel."

The June 1967 issue was dedicated to the Six Day War. It included contributions from Rabbi Max Nussbaum, Yosef Saphir, Rabbi Charles E. Shulman, Zalman Abramov, Gideon Hausner and Bill Mauldin(republished from The New Republic).
