= We Are in America =

We Are In America
- Editor: Ayala Or-El
- Frequency: monthly magazine
- Circulation: 10,000 (print), 150,000 online
- Publisher: Eyal Shemesh
- Founded: 2006
- First issue: August 2006
- Country: USA
- Language: Hebrew
- Website: http://www.weareinamerica.com/

We Are In America (also known as Anachnu B’America in Hebrew) is a free monthly magazine tailored to Jewish Israelis living in the United States, and focuses on culture, community events and the Jewish Israeli lifestyle. It is written in Hebrew. The magazine was founded in 2006, and the first issue was published in August 2006. The magazine is published by Eyal Shemesh and its editor-in-chief is Ayala Or-el.

The magazine reaches approximately 10,000 Jewish households in the Greater Los Angeles Area, including San Fernando Valley, Orange, San Diego and Ventura Counties, and Las Vegas, NV. The magazine is also available online, with an approximate online readership of 150,000 per month.

The magazine features articles on the “Jewish Israeli lifestyle,” and columns about a variety of subjects including religion, physical health, relationships, political opinions, psychology, community events, movie reviews, travel, local outdoor activities and Judaism. As of 2012, most of the magazine's regular contributors live on the West Coast.

The magazine sponsors various local Jewish Israeli events throughout the year, such as the Israel Film Festival and The Big Jewish Tent and is involved with charitable organization Stand By Me, which supports cancer patients and their families.

== See also ==
- Hadoar
