= The Eternal Road (opera) =

Der Weg der Verheißung The Eternal Road
- Opera-oratorio by Kurt Weill
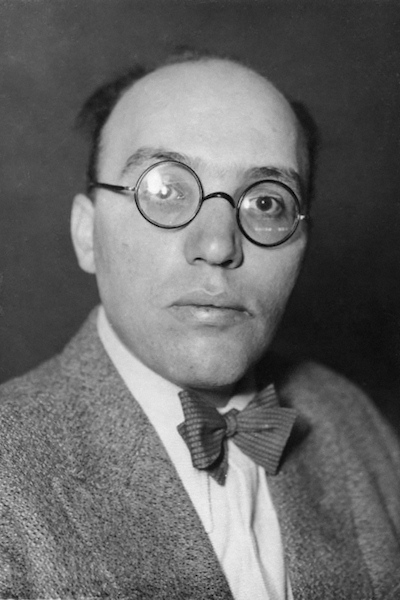
- The composer in 1932
- Native title: Der Weg der Verheißung
- Librettist: Franz Werfel
- Language: English, translated by Ludwig Lewisohn
- Based on: Biblical and pre-World War II Jewish history
- Premiere: 7 January 1937; Manhattan Opera House, New York City

The Eternal Road is an opera-oratorio with spoken dialogue in four acts by Kurt Weill with a libretto (originally in German: Der Weg der Verheißung – The Way of the Covenant), by Austrian novelist and playwright Franz Werfel. The work was translated into English by Ludwig Lewisohn, and his translation was further adapted by William A. Drake prior to its premiere.

The Eternal Road premiered at the Manhattan Opera House on January 7, 1937, given a lavish and spectacular production involving 245 actors, and ran for 153 performances. Although it received good reviews, it was not revived for 63 years.

The piece was conceived by Zionist activist Meyer Weisgal to alert the then-ignorant public to Hitler's persecution of the Jews in 1937 Germany. Weisgal enlisted the help of director Max Reinhardt, who found Weill to compose the music and Werfel to write the libretto. Set in a synagogue where Jews hide all night as a pogrom rages outside, the story combines Biblical and pre-World War II Jewish history. The rabbi reads from the Torah, leading, in each act, to the exploration and re-enactment of a different Biblical theme. At the conclusion, the destruction of the Temple in Jerusalem and the deportation of those hiding become one, while the despair of a scattered people is balanced by a messianic voice that speaks of hope for deliverance of the Jews in Zion. The music evokes cantorial lamentations, classical fugues and showtunes, among other styles.

== Performance history ==
After its initial performances, the first revival took place at the Chemnitz Opera, Germany, and then at the Brooklyn Academy of Music in New York City during the 1999/2000 season (the 100th anniversary of Weill's birth and the 50th of his death). The 62-year gap was partly due to the six-hour running time, even after substantial cuts had been made.

The European premiere took place on June 13, 1999, at the Chemnitz Opera, Germany, as part of the centennial celebrations of the composer's birth. Directed by the German Michael Heinecke, designed by Israeli David Sharir and conducted by the American John Mauceri, the score was performed complete and in its original German for the first time. Despite the immense challenges of mounting this epic work in its entirety "Mauceri succeeded in achieving balance among the large performing forces—symphony orchestra, choruses (some offstage), vocal ensembles, soloists and actors—in a work of vast scale and varied stylistic idiom." In order to present the work as a complete whole "[Musicologist Edward Harsh] and John Mauceri orchestrated some recitatives and passages otherwise not extant. Part of act 4, left unorchestrated by Weill, had been previously realized by Noam Sheriff ... Thus, the audience at Chemnitz heard Weill's score performed by full orchestra for the first time in the work's history."

In 1998 David Drew devised a concert adaptation from the fourth act of The Eternal Road, titled Propheten (Prophets); Drew used German text by Franz Werfel and Bible passages. Supplemental orchestration was provided by Noam Sheriff. It was first performed on May 28, 1998, in Vienna with the Österreichische Rundfunkorchester, Dennis Russell Davies conducting. It was subsequently performed at the BBC Proms, who had commissioned the work, in the Royal Albert Hall in July 1998 with Matthias Bamert conducting.

A co-production of the Chemnitz Opera, the New Israeli Opera, the Kraków Opera, and the Brooklyn Academy of Music, Der Weg der Verheißung received its Israeli premiere on April 20, 2000, at the Tel Aviv Performing Arts Center and returned to New York for performances at the Brooklyn Academy of Music between February 10 and March 5, 2000, again conducted by John Mauceri.

== Roles ==
Roles, voice types, premiere cast
| Role | Voice type | Premiere cast, 7 January 1937 Conductor: Isaac Van Grove |
|---|---|---|
| Rabbi | tenor | Myron Taylor |
| The Adversary | speaking role | Sam Jaffe |
| The Timid Soul | speaking role | Mark Schweid |
| The Rich Man | speaking role | Anthony Blair |
| The Estranged One | speaking role | Harold Johnsrud |
| The Estranged One's Son | tenor | Sidney Lumet |
| President of the Congregation | speaking role | David A. Leonard |
| Pious Man | speaking role | Robert Harrison |
| Pious Man | speaking role | Bennett Challis |
| Pious Man | speaking role | Cassius C. Quimby |
| Pious Man | speaking role | Hal Kingsley |
| Fanatic | | Roger de Koven |
| The Watchman | speaking role | David Kurian |
| Boy of the Congregation | speaking role | Nat L. Mintz |
| Jesse | | Herbert Rudley |
| The Alien Girl | speaking role | Olive Deering |
| An Ancient | | Charles Hale |
| Abraham | baritone | Thomas Chalmers |
| Sarah | | Bertha Kunz-Baker |
| Eliezer | baritone | Carl Formes |
| The White Angel | | John Uppman |
| First Dark Angel | | Edward Kane |
| Second Dark Angel | | Ben Cutler |
| Jacob | tenor | Ralph Jameson |
| Rachel | soprano | Sarah Osnath-Halevy |
| Joseph | baritone | Earl Weatherford |
| Reuben | | Robert Warren Bentley |
| Levi | | Joseph Macaulay |
| Zebulon | | Kurt Kasznar |
| Dan | | Carl Formes |
| Naphtali | | Edward Fisher |
| Gad | | Leonard Mence |
| Asher | | Edward Vermonti |
| The Juggler | | Florence Meyer |
| Moses | baritone | Samuel Goldenberg |
| Miriam | soprano | Lotte Lenya |
| Aaron | | Noel Cravat |
| The Adversary's Follower | | Benjamin Zemach |
| Ruth | mezzo-soprano | Katherine Carrington |
| King Saul | baritone | Walter Gilbert |
| Bath-Sheba | mezzo-soprano | Rosamond Pinchot |
| Uriah | | Raymond Miller |
| Voice of God | baritone | |
| Angel of Death | bass | Joseph Macaulay |
| Boaz | baritone | |
| Isaac | treble | Dick Van Patten |
| Reaper | baritone | |
| David | tenor | |
| Chananjah | baritone | |
Voice of the Angel of the End of Days; Sarah; Isaac; Joseph's Brothers; double chorus, SATB.
Speaking roles: Pious Men, President, Elders, Women, and Boys of the Congregation, The Estranged One and his son, The Adversary, The Timid Soul, The Rich Man, The Watchman, The Youth, The Strange Girl, The Witch of Endor, Bath-Sheba, Uriah, Zedekiah, Pashur

== Reception ==
In The New York Times of January 8, 1937, Brooks Atkinson noted:

After an eternity of postponements The Eternal Road has finally arrived at the Manhattan Opera House, where it opened last evening. Let it be said at once that the ten postponements are understood and forgiven. Out of the heroic stories of old Jewish history Max Reinhardt and his many assistants have evoked a glorious pageant of great power and beauty.

== Recordings ==
- 2003: Constance Haumann (soprano), Barbara Rearick (mezzo-soprano), Hanna Wollschlaeger (mezzo-soprano), Ian DeNolfo (tenor), Karl Dent (tenor), Val Rideout (tenor), Ted Christopher (baritone), James Maddalena (baritone), Ernst Senff Choir, Rundfunk-Sinfonieorchester Berlin, Gerard Schwarz (cond.), (excerpts performed in English), Milken Archive/Naxos Records CD 8.559402
- 2016: The Road of Promise – World premiere recording of the concert adaptation of The Eternal Road. Recorded live at Carnegie Hall, New York City (May 6 & 7, 2015): Anthony Dean Griffey (the Rabbi), Mark Delavan (Abraham/Moses), Ron Rifkin (the Adversary), Eli Tokash (the Thirteen-Year-Old Boy), AJ Glueckert (Jacob/Boaz/David/Isaiah/Hananiah), Laure Michele (Rachel/Soul of Moses/Naomi), Megan Marino (Miriam/Ruth), Justin Hopkins (the Dark Angel), Philip Cutlip (Joseph/Solomon/Jeremiah), Michael Slattery (the Voice), Sean Fallen (Angel #1), Jose Pietri-Coimbre (Angel #2). MasterVoices and Orchestra of St. Luke's, Ted Sperling (conductor). Ed Harsh (concert adaptation), Noam Sheriff (additional orchestrations). Ludwig Lewisohn, William A. Drake, Charles Alan, Kelley Rourke (English translations). Navona Records, NV 6059 – 2 CDs (CD-1: 61:58, CD-2: 53:39).
