= Independent Jewish Press Service =

Jewish news agency

The Independent Jewish Press Service, (JPS) founded in 1935 was based in New York, (notably) active in the 1940s.

Its reporting was described as "of tremendous historical importance". Such as 161 American press releases from before and after US involvement in World War II, containing detailed day-to-day reporting on the ongoing Holocaust atrocities and were distributed in the U.S. A November 17th 1941 article entitled, Polish Jews Advertise Own Execution. describes a gruesome scene in the Fort VII concentration camp. Having been forced to wear large posters on their backs with the following notice in German, shall be hung tomorrow at eleven o'clock three Jews were hanged in by the Nazis in Poznan for having stolen a piece of bread...

From February 12, 1944:

The Independent Jewish Press service announced today the receipt of an eyewitness account of the horrors of Treblinka, the Polish "city of death," where hundreds of Jews are reported to have been executed in gas chambers on Hitler's orders. Written "somewhere in occupied Europe" by a Polish Jew, well-known in the Zionist movement, who has escaped from Poland and is hiding in a neighboring country, the statement was smuggled out of Europe through underground channels via Palestine, the press service stated.

In May, 1944 it reported:

Symbolic of the spirit of the Ghetto Jews it has been reported by Independent Jewish Press Service that the first baby to be born in the Budapest ghetto has been named Tikvah, meaning "hope."

In 1942 it was under Martha Neumark.

On October 23, 1942, Gottschalk Max wrote on "Jewish Post-War Problems".

Its editor, ar least since 1944, was Dr. Judd L. Teller.

Leading Jewish newspapers had routinely published material as: "Compiled From Cables of Independent Jewish Press Service". Such as: the Wisconsin Jewish Chronicle, and the Detroit Jewish News who was a member of Independent Jewish Press Service, among other.

Noted reporters include Bernard Lerner, especially 1943–48.

The Independent Jewish Press Service folded at the end of 1948.
