= Harold U. Ribalow =

American writer & editor (1919–1982)

Harold U. Ribalow (July 1, 1919 – October 22, 1982) was an American writer, editor, and anthologist.

== Background and family ==
Harold Uriel Ribalow was born in 1918 in Russia and immigrated to the United States as a small child. In 1921 his father, Menachem Ribalow, founded a newspaper for Jewish immigrants called Hadoar; the paper was published in New York and distributed nationwide. Ribalow and his wife, Shoshana, were the parents of a daughter, Reena Ben-Ephraim, and a son, Meir Z. Ribalow.

== Career ==
Ribalow worked for the Israel Bond Organization in New York for 30 years. Ribalow was a sports columnist for Hadoar and sports editor of the Jewish Telegraphic Agency. He was contributor to The New York Times Book Review, Commentary, Saturday Review, and The Nation.

Ribalow was a member of the Jewish Academy of Arts and Sciences.

Arthur Hertzberg credited Ribelow with "rediscovering" novelist Henry Roth, who published Call It Sleep in 1934 and seemingly disappeared. Ribelow found him on a farm in Maine and persuaded him to permit a new edition of the novel. Ribalow wrote an introduction to the new edition, which was published by Pageant Books in 1960. Years later, when Roth was awarded the Ribalow Prize -named in Ribalow's honour - Roth wrote to Ribalow's son, Meir Z. Ribalow, "Thanks for the encomia. Things like that keep me alive, I'm sure: what little is left me capable of feeling swells with pride like the staves of an old barrel when filled. Harold, to whom I owe so much, would have been happy to witness the occasion."

Ribalow was the editor of several collections of Jewish short stories, The Chosen, This Land, These People, These Your Children, and My Name Aloud.

The Harold U. Ribalow Prize is named in his honour.

== Books ==
- The Jew in American Sports (1948) In 1983, the New York Jewish Week described The Jew in American Sports as. "the quintessential bar mitzvah gift of the 1950s and 1960s.
- The World's Greatest Boxing Stories
- Daniel Mendoza, Fighter from Whitechapel (New York: Farrar, Straus, and Cudahy, Inc., 1962)
- Autobiographies of American Jews
- The Great Jewish Books (1952, edited with Samuel Caplan)
- Fighting Heroes of Israel
- The History of Israel's Postage Stamps
- What's Your Jewish I.Q.?
- The Tie That Binds, Ribalow's final book, was a series of interviews with American Jewish writers.
