= Al-Domi =

Organization formed during WWII by Jews in Palestine to rescue Jews from the Holocaust

Al-Domi - from the Hebrew "do not remain silent" - was an organization founded in 1942 by Jews in Palestine to exhort for the rescue of Jews under Nazi rule.

The phrase "Al-Domi" comes from Psalm 83:1.

Founding members included Schmuel-Yosef Agnon, Yosef Klausner and Schmuel Hugo Bergman. The second meeting was also attended by Yitzak Halevi Herzog (chief rabbi), Daniel Auster (then deputy mayor of Jerusalem), Martin Buber, Judah Magnes, David Shimonovitz, Yosef Kruk and Henrietta Szold, among others.
