= Herberg =

Herberg (or הרברג in Hebrew) is an Ashkenazi Jewish surname originating in Northern, Central and Eastern Europe.

== Origins ==
Herberg appears to have originated somewhere in the Ashkenazi Jewish community of Europe several hundred years ago.

== Notable people with the last name Herberg ==
Notable people with the surname include:

- Daniel Herberg (born 1974), German curler of Jewish descent.
- Markus Herberg, German curler and coach.
- Shlomo Herberg (1884–1966), Israeli poet, teacher, translator and early aliyah pioneer of Lithuanian-Polish Jewish (then part of the Russian Empire) (Ashkenazi Jewish) origin, who was awarded the Tchernichovsky Prize for Literature for his work translating various works of literature, as well as his many self-written literary works and poems.
- Will Herberg (1901–1977), American political activist, writer and Jewish theologian of Belarusian Jewish descent.

There are also various individuals in Norway and America of Jewish descent with this surname.
