= Tchernichovsky Prize =

- Awarded for: Exemplary translation to Hebrew
- Country: Israel
- Presented by: Tel Aviv-Yafo Municipality
- First award: 1942; 84 years ago (first award 1943)
- Website: https://www.tel-aviv.gov.il/Pages/ItemPage.aspx?webId=f09859c7-1a46-40e0-8968-9ae31388b659&listId=229c1b0e-698e-4b08-af1e-e769ab00a112&itemId=11

The Tchernichovsky Prize is an Israeli prize awarded to individuals for exemplary works of translation into Hebrew.

The Tchernichovsky Prize is awarded by the municipality of Tel Aviv-Yafo. Although initially awarded annually, it is now awarded every two years.

The prize was founded, in the name of the poet Shaul Tchernichovsky, following a 1942 resolution of the municipality. Tchernichovsky himself participated in formulating the policies for the grant of the award and attended the first award ceremony for the prize in 1943.

== Recipients ==
- Saul Adler
- Nathan Alterman
- Aharon Amir, 1951
- Hugo Bergmann
- Isaac Dov Berkowitz
- Ya'akov Cahan
- Shlomo Dykman
- Israel Eldad
- Ran HaCohen
- Shlomo Herberg
- Ephraim Katzir
- Menashe Levin, 1951
- Levana Moshon, 1995
- Tal Nitzán
- Yosef Or, 1951
- Rami Saari
- Aharon Shabtai
- Abraham Schalit
- David Shimoni
- Avraham Shlonsky
- Eisig Silberschlag, 1951
- Leon Simon
- Reuven Snir
- Joseph Gerhard Liebes
- Nili Mirsky (1989)
