= David Shimoni =

Israeli poet, writer, and translator

- דוד שמעוני
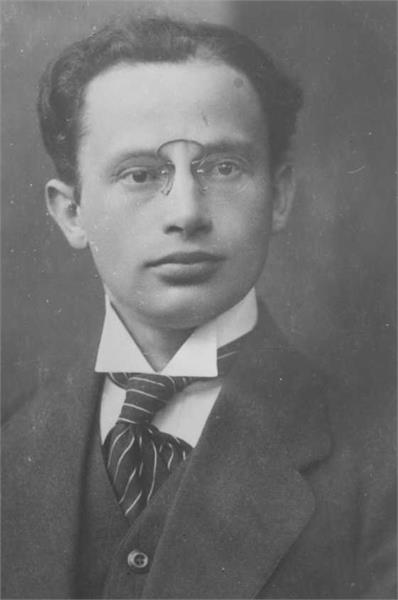
- David Shimoni in 1935
- Born: Shimonovitch; 22 August 1886; Babruysk, Minsk Governorate, Russian Empire
- Died: 10 December 1956 (aged 65); Tel Aviv, Israel
- Occupations: Poet, writer, translator
- Awards: Bialik Prize (1936, 1949); Israel Prize (1954); Tchernichovsky Prize

David Shimoni (Hebrew: דוד שמעוני; 22 August 1886 – 10 December 1956) was an Israeli poet, writer and translator.

Shimonovitch (later David Shimoni) was born in Babruysk in Belarus (then part of the Russian Empire) to Nissim Shimonovitch and Malka Fridland Although he lived in Ottoman Palestine for a year in 1909, he did not immigrate to British-administered Palestine until 1920. He was an early member of Al-Domi.

== Awards and commemoration ==
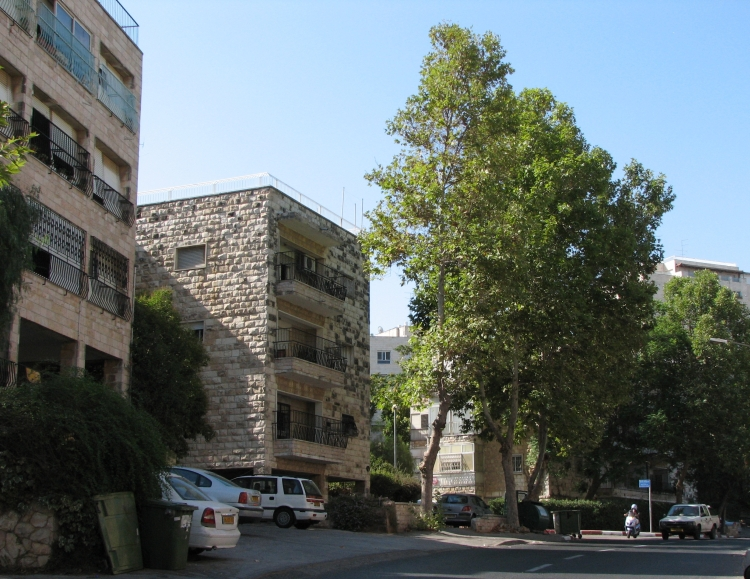
Shimoni Street, Jerusalem

- In 1936 and 1949, Shimoni was awarded the Bialik Prize for Literature.
- In 1954, he was awarded the Israel Prize, for literature.
- He is also a recipient of the Tchernichovsky Prize for exemplary translation.

Shimoni Street in Jerusalem is named after him, as is Shimoni Street in Beersheva, Israel.

== See also ==
- List of Bialik Prize recipients
- List of Israel Prize recipients
