= Abraham Schalit =

Israeli historian (1898–1979)

- אברהם שליט
- Born: 1898; Zolochiv, Austria-Hungary
- Died: 21 August 1979 (aged 80–81)
- Education: University of Vienna
- Awards: Tchernichovsky Prize; Israel Prize (1960)

Abraham Haim Schalit (Hebrew: אברהם שליט; 1898 – 21 August 1979) was an Israeli historian and a scholar of the Second Temple period.

== Biography ==
Schalit was born in 1898 in the Galician town of Zolochiv, then in Austria-Hungary (from 1918 to 1939 in Poland and now in Ukraine). He studied at the University of Vienna. In 1929, he immigrated to Mandate Palestine, now Israel. In 1950, he joined the faculty of History Department of the Hebrew University of Jerusalem and was appointed a professor in 1959.

== Major works ==
Abraham Schalit wrote his major works on Herod and Josephus. The discovery of his lost 1925 Vienna dissertation on Josephus shows a shift in his views. He originally saw Josephus as a bad historian but a patriot, sincerely seeking to further the rebels' cause against Rome. Later he regarded him as a pragmatist.

== Awards ==
- In 1960, Schalit was awarded the Israel Prize in Jewish studies.
- Schalit was a recipient of the Tchernichovsky Prize for exemplary translation.

== See also ==
- List of Israel Prize recipients
