= Menachem Ribalow =

Menachem Ribalow (1895 – September 17, 1953) was an immigrant, American Jewish editor, writer, and Hebraist. He is noted for his role in developing Hebrew language publications and culture in the American Jewish community.

Ribalow was born in Chudniv, Russian Empire. He immigrated to the United States in 1921.

Ribalow was the editor of Hadoar, described by the Jewish Telegraphic Agency as, "one of the best Hebrew-language magazines in the world," in its day. Ribalow edited Hadoar for over 30 years.

Ribalow also edited the Hebrew-language literary quarterly, Mabuah.

He was the editor of the American Hebrew yearbook, Sefer Hashanah. He wrote several books about Hebrew and Yiddish literature, and an anthology of Hebrew poetry. He also published numerous articles in New Palestine, the official magazine of the Zionist Organization of America.

Ribalow's book, The Flowering of Modern Hebrew Literature, an anthology of contemporary Hebrew literature, was translated into English by his son-in-law, Rabbi Judah Nadich. Nadich added biographical sketches of the Hebrew writers included in the anthology to his translation, published by Twayne in 1959.

Ribelow died at age 54 at Lebanon Hospital in New York. He was married to Rose Ribelow. The couple had two children, Harold U. Ribalow and Martha Hadassah Nadich.
