= Reuven Snir =

Israeli academic and translator

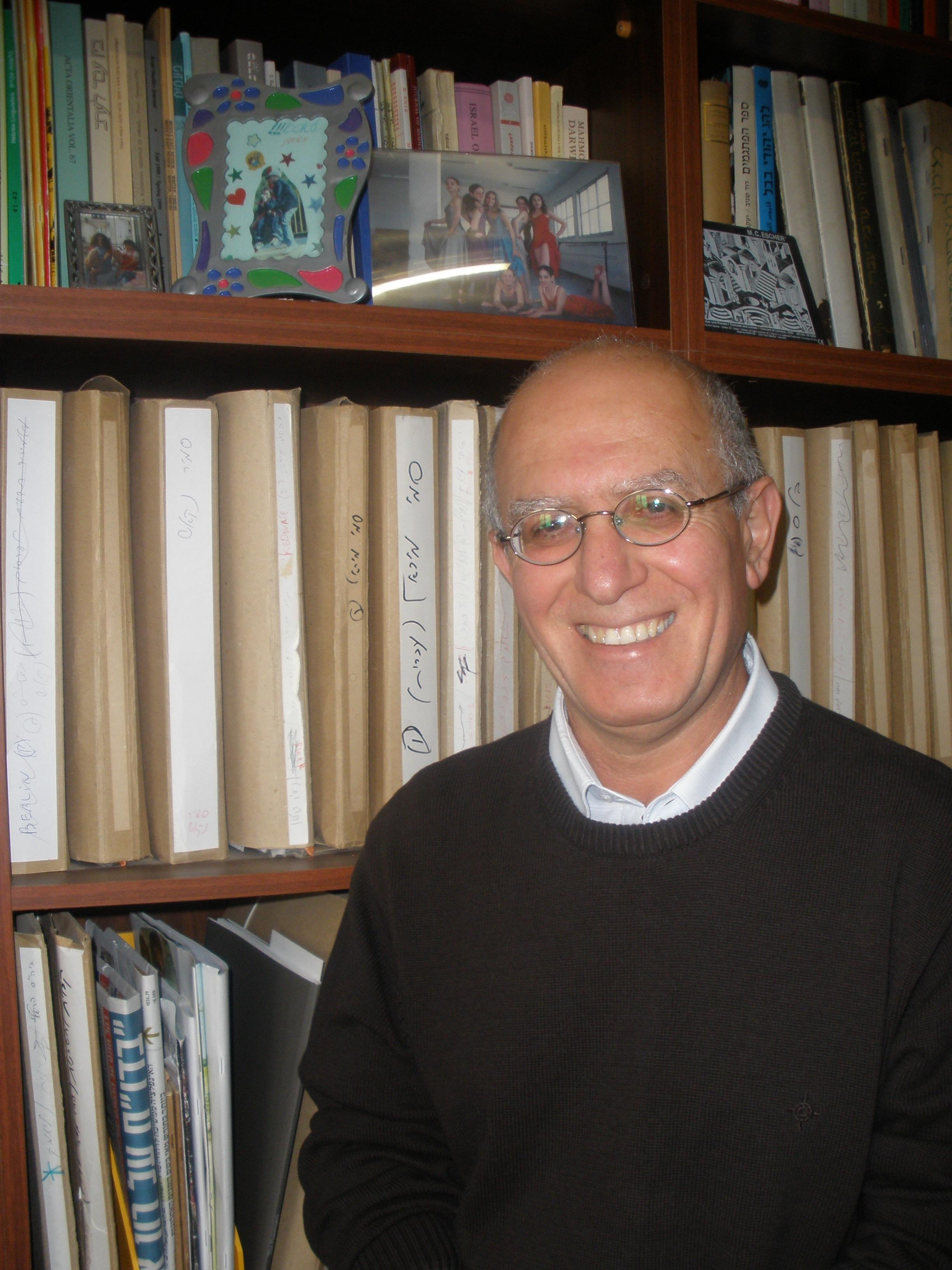
Reuven Snir, 2009

Reuven Snir (Hebrew: ראובן שניר; born 1953) is an Israeli Jewish academic, Professor of Arabic language and literature at the University of Haifa, Dean of Humanities, and a translator of poetry between Arabic, Hebrew, and English. He is the winner of the Tchernichovsky Prize for translation (2014).

== Biography ==
Reuven Snir was born in Haifa to a family which had immigrated from Baghdad in 1951. The language spoken at home between his parents was the Iraqi spoken Arabic, but as a Sabra – a native-born Israeli Jew – Hebrew was his mother tongue, while Arabic was for him, as dictated by the Israeli-Zionist educational system, the language of the enemy, furthermore, Arabness and Jewishness were considered as mutually exclusive.

He was educated at the Nirim School in Mahne David, a transit camp (ma‘barah) established near Haifa for the immigrating Arab Jews. Then he moved to the Hebrew Reali School in Haifa. He obtained his M.A. from the Hebrew University (1982) for a thesis which included edition of an ascetic manuscript entitled Kitāb al-Zuhd by al-Mu‘afa ibn ‘Imran from the 8th century.

In 1987, he was granted Ph.D. for a dissertation written at the same university about the mystical dimensions in modern Arabic poetry.

While studying at the Hebrew University, he served as a senior news editor, at the Voice of Israel, Arabic Section (1977–1988). Between 2000 and 2004, he served as the chair of the Department of Arabic Language and Literature at the University of Haifa. Since 1996, he has been serving as an associate editor of the Arabic-language journal Al-Karmil – Studies in Arabic Language and Literature. He participated in the international exhibition in honor of the Syrian poet and literary scholar Adunis held at the Institut du monde arabe in Paris, which resulted in the publication of Adonis: un poète dans le monde d’aujourd’hui 1950-2000 (Paris: Institut du monde arabe, 2000).

He served as a fellow at Wissenschaftskolleg zu Berlin (2004–2005), Oxford Centre for Hebrew and Jewish Studies (2000 and 2008), the Katz Center for Advanced Judaic Studies (2018–2019), and taught at Heidelberg University (2002) and Freie Universität Berlin (2005). Following a course he gave in Berlin, his students published the first collection of short stories by Iraqi Jews translated into German.

== Research interests ==
Since the start of his academic career, Snir has concentrated on several subjects stemming from one comprehensive research plan in an attempt to investigate the internal dynamics of the Arabic literary system, the interrelations and interactions between its various sectors, such as the canonical and non-canonical sub-systems, and the external relationships with other non-literary systems (e.g. religious, social, national, and political) and with foreign cultural systems. Another central theoretical axis of Snir's studies, especially during the last decade, is the issue of identity based on what has been argued in the theoretical discourse of cultural studies that identities are subject to a radical historicization, and are constantly in the process of change and transformation and they are about questions of using the resources of history, language and culture in the process of becoming rather than being: not “who we are” or “where we came from”, so much as what we might become, how we have been represented and how that bears on how we might represent ourself.

=== Publications ===
Snir has been publishing in English, Arabic and Hebrew. The following are the topics about which he published his major studies:

=== The Modern Arabic Literary System ===
An Operative Functional Dynamic Historical Model for the Study of Arabic Literature Based on the assumption that no literary critic can deal systematically with literary phenomena without relating them, either implicitly or explicitly, to some framework of facts or ideas, Snir published studies outlining a theoretical framework that would make possible the comprehensive analysis of all the diverse texts that make up modern Arabic literature. These studies led to a book length study on the topic.

Among the chapters of the book: “The Modern Arabic Literary System,” which refers to the topic of popular literature and its legitimation; “The Literary Dynamics in the Synchronic Crosssection,” which presents both the canonical and the noncanonical literature on three levels texts for adult, for children and the translated texts, with a summary of the internal and external interrelationships; and “Outlines of the Diachronic Intersystemic Development,” examines the issue of the diachronic interactions that obtain between the literary system and various other literary as well as extra-literary systems.

His last books are

Modern Arabic Literature: A Theoretical Framework, Edinburgh: Edinburgh University Press, 2017

Arab-Jewish Literature: The Birth and Demise of the Arabic Short Story, Leiden: Brill, 2019

Contemporary Arabic Literature: Heritage and Innovation, Edinburgh: Edinburgh University Press, 2023

Palestinian and Arab-Jewish Cultures: Language, Literature, and Identity, Edinburgh: Edinburgh University Press, 2023

=== The Iraqi Poet ‘Abd al-Wahhab al-Bayyati (1926-1999) ===
Poetry was once the principal channel of literary creativity among the Arabs and served as their chronicle and public register, recording their very appearance on the stage of history. During the second half of the 20th century however the novel became the leading genre. This change in the status of literary genres is not exclusive to Arabic literature and has much to do with the hermetic nature of modernist poetry, which has become self-regarding and employs obscure imagery and very subjective language. In an attempt to present the great change that occurs in Arabic poetry during the 20th century, Snir published a study of the poetry of the Iraqi poet ‘Abd al-Wahhab Al-Bayati, one of the standard bearers of modern Arabic poetry.

The meaning of the title of the book is based on an utterance by the Persian mystic and forerunner of Sufism, al-Husayn ibn Mansur al-Hallaj who was executed in 922. following his preaching which was considered as blasphemy. Al-Azhar University in Cairo banned the circulation of the book for what was described as defaming Islam by titling the study with a reference to an utterance which might be interpreted as heresy.

=== Arab-Jewish Identity and Culture ===
Since the late 1980s, Snir has been investigating Arab-Jewish identity against the backdrop of the gradual demise of Arab-Jewish culture. Until the 20th century, the great majority of the Jews under the rule of Islam adopted Arabic as their language; now Arabic is gradually disappearing as a language mastered by Jews. In his studies on the topic he has referred to a kind of unspoken agreement between the two national movements, Zionism and Arab nationalism – each with the mutually exclusive support of a divine authority – to perform a total cleansing of Arab-Jewish culture. Both of them have excluded the hybrid Arab-Jewish identity and highlighted instead a “pure” Jewish-Zionist identity against a “pure” Muslim-Arab one. In the modern period, Jews were nowhere as open to participation in the wider modern Arab culture as in Iraq, where the Jewish community had lived without interruption for two and a half millennia. In his major study in the field, Snir has provided a documented history of the modern Arab culture of Iraqi Jews.

Apart from the Hebrew book, Snir has published in recent years articles about various aspects of Arab Jewish culture, chronicling the demise of that culture. The following are the major areas of his research in this field: Arab-Jewish culture and journalism, the cultural Arabic activities of Iraqi Jews, and the Egyptian Jews and their conflicting cultural tendencies.

=== The Emergence and Development of Palestinian Theatre ===
One of Snir's major research projects has been the investigation of the development of Palestinian theatre. His first contribution in the field was included in a special volume of Contemporary Theatre Review on “Palestinians and Israelis in the Theatre.”

In 2005 he published a book which summarized his findings. The study endeavors to outline the historical development of Palestinian dramatic literature and theatre from its hesitant rise before 1948 and the first theatrical attempts, to the heavy blow which these attempts suffered as a result of the establishment of the State of Israel, to regeneration of the professional theatre out of the ashes of the 1967 defeat, through to the activities of the 1970s and the role they played in Palestinian nation-building.

=== Religion, Mysticism and Modern Arabic Literature ===
The connections between Arabic literature and Islamic mysticism were in the centre of some of Snir's investigations and publications. In 2005 he summarized his findings in a book which deals with the synchronic status of traditional literature in the literary system and the diachronic relationship between Arabic literature and Islam in modern times. Also, within the generic cross-section, it deals with the mystical theme in Arabic poetry, its literary and extra-literary concretization in the writings of one author, and its materialization in one text.

=== Arabic Science Fiction ===
As the study of non-canonical texts (i.e. those literary works that have been rejected by the dominant circles as illegitimate) and their relationship with canonical texts is essential if we wish to arrive at an adequate understanding of the historical development of Arabic literature, he has undertaken to explore the genre of science fiction and the process of its canonization in Arabic literature.

=== The Poetry of Mahmud Darwish ===
Concentrating broadly on how Palestinian poetry has been chronicling the nakba (the catastrophe of 1948) and its unending agonies, Snir has studied a specific chronicle of the Palestinian people in the mid-1980s against the backdrop of the Israeli invasion of Lebanon in 1982 and prior to the outbreak of the first intifada in the West Bank and Gaza Strip. In fact, it is a chronicle undertaken by a single poet, Mahmud Darwish (1941–2008) mainly in one collection, Ward Aqall [Fewer Roses] (1986), and more specifically in one poem, “Other Barbarians Will Come”.

=== Entries in Encyclopedias ===
Snir served as a Contributing Editor for Encyclopedia of Modern Jewish Culture (London & New York: Routledge, 2005) for which he has contributed the entries on Arab-Jewish culture. He also contributed to several other international encyclopedia.

=== Translations ===
Translations into Arabic

Snir's translations of Hebrew poetry into Arabic were published in Mifgash-Liqa’ (Israel), Farādīs (Paris), and on the Internet, such as in www.elaph.com. An anthology of Hebrew poetry translated into Arabic was published on the Internet.

He also published a collection of translated poems by two Hebrew poets, Ronny Someck and Amir Or.

Translations into Hebrew

Adonis, Maftah Pe‘ulut ha-Ruah (Index of the Acts of the Wind (Tel Aviv: Keshev, 2012)

Mahmud Darwish ― 50 Shenot Shira (Mahmud Darwish ― 50 Years of Poetry) (Tel Aviv: Keshev, 2015)

Translations of Arabic literature, especially poetry, into Hebrew were published in literary supplements, magazines and books (Helikon, Moznaim, ‘Iton 77, Mifgash-Liqa’, Ha’aretz, Ma‘ariv, Al HaMishmar).

Translations into English

Reuven Snir, Baghdad ― The City in Verse (Cambridge, MA: Harvard University Press, 2013)
