= Judd L. Teller =

American author, social historian, and lecturer (1912–1972)

Judd L Teller (Yehuda-Leib) (May 5, 1912 – May 3, 1972) was an American author, social historian, lecturer, poet, and held many professional posts in Jewish community life.

Teller was born in Tarnopol, (then) Austria, experienced suffering, starvation at World War I. His mother and grandmother, with young Judd and his brother ran a store from their home which was outside the Jewish Quarter of the city. They baked and provided bread, poultices, and other goods to the "peasant" (non-Jewish) locals. Their customers and neighbors included the postmaster and his wife and the priest, the latter two of whom made some effort to protect the family from the frequent attempts to extract, enslave and rape Jews, perpetrated by other neighbors, by soldiers in marauding armies during advances and retreats, and by nationalist zealots of the Polish Independence movement. Their sometimes neighborly protectors could not, however, prevent the looting of their supplies and did not protect the Jewish Quarter of the city from arson and other large scale attacks. In 1921 he was brought to the United States by his father who had moved there before the war.

He studied at City College of New York, and his Masters and Doctorate degrees at Columbia University in psychology, Ph.D. He later traveled on assignment in Europe, Asia and Africa.

Teller served as editor of the Independent Jewish Press Service, staff writer and correspondent for the Jewish Morning Journal and wrote for Commentary magazine, Midstream, Middle East Journal, The New York Herald Tribune Syndicate, The Christian Science Monitor, The New Republic, Congress Weekly, The Nation, and Jewish Social Studies.

Teller was director of the Institute for Policy Planning and Research of the Synagogue Council of America.

Teller authored books, the last of them, published in 1968, being Strangers and Natives: The Evolution of the American Jew from 1921 to the Present. It was a selection of the then-prestigious Commentary Book Club, for readers of Commentary monthly magazine—a Jewish opinion publication He was personally involved in events he describes. Other books he authored included Scapegoat of Revolution (1954); The Kremlin, the Jews and the Middle East (1957); The Jews: Biography of a People (1966) and The People of Yiddish (1971).

Teller was a poet in Yiddish since a young age.
