= Congress Weekly =

Former American periodical

The Congress Weekly magazine was a periodical, published in New York, by the American Jewish Congress.

The magazine was "a review of Jewish interests.". It was founded in the 1930s.

Samuel Caplan was its editor from 1940 till 1966.

Among its contributors was author and poet Judd L. Teller.

The Congress weekly magazine became a bi-weekly in 1959, known as Congress bi-weekly magazine.

It later (at least since 1975) became a monthly magazine, Congress Monthly, with articles on public policy and public affairs.
