= The Maccabaean =

- Editor: Louis Lipsky; Jacob de Haas
- Succeeded by: New Palestine
- Founded: October 1901
- Ceased publication: before 1919
- Language: English, Yiddish
- City: New York
- Country: United States

The Maccabaean was a monthly magazine of Jewish life and literature published in New York that was founded in 1901.

== History ==
The Maccabaean was established in October 1901, as the outcome of a resolution unanimously passed at a convention of the societies affiliated with the Federation of American Zionists, held in Philadelphia the previous June.

Until June 1902, The Maccabaean was issued partly in English and partly in Yiddish under the editorship of Louis Lipsky. By a resolution of the convention held in Boston in June 1902, the Yiddish department was dropped, and the editorial chair was taken over by Jacob de Haas. In January 1903 the publication was incorporated as a stock company, the Federation holding the majority of the stock, and Richard Gottheil being appointed president of the company.

Among the magazine's contributors were Louis Ginzberg, Bernhard Felsenthal, Israel Davidson, and Israel Zangwill.
