= Shlomo Dykman =

Shlomo Dykman שלמה דיקמן
- Born: 10 February 1917; Warsaw, Poland
- Died: 1965 (aged 47 or 48); Israel
- Citizenship: Israeli
- Writing career
- Language: Hebrew and Polish
- Notable awards: Tchernichovsky Prize (1961); Israel Prize (1965)

Shlomo Dykman (Hebrew: שלמה דיקמן; 10 February 1917 – 1965) was a Polish-Israeli translator and classical scholar.

== Biography ==
Dykman was born in 1917 in Warsaw, Poland. He attended school at the Hinuch Hebrew Gymnasium, and then studied the classics at the Institute of Jewish Studies at Warsaw University.

He began publishing translations and literary reviews in Poland in 1935, including translations from Hebrew into Polish. In 1939, he published a Polish translation of all of Bialik's poems.

Following the outbreak of World War II and the division of Poland between Germany and the Soviet Union, he fled to Bukhara, where he taught Hebrew. In 1944, he was arrested by the Soviet authorities and accused of Zionist and counter-revolutionary activities. He was initially sentenced to death, but the sentence was commuted to five to ten years hard labour. He served his sentence working in coal mines in the Arctic region of the northern Ural Mountains called Vorkutlag. In 1957, he returned to Warsaw and, in 1960, he emigrated to Israel and settled in Jerusalem.

Dykman published many Hebrew translations of Greek literature and of the Roman and Latin classics. Among his translations were the tragedies of "Aeschylus" and "Sophocles", the poem "Aeneid" by Virgil and "Metamorphoses" by Ovid.

== Awards and honours ==
- In 1961, Dykman was awarded the Tchernichovsky Prize for exemplary translation.
- In 1965, he was awarded the Israel Prize, in literature.

== Family ==
His son, Aminadav Dykman, was also a translator and literary scholar.

== See also ==
- List of Israel Prize recipients
