= Ludwig Lewisohn =

American novelist (1882–1955)

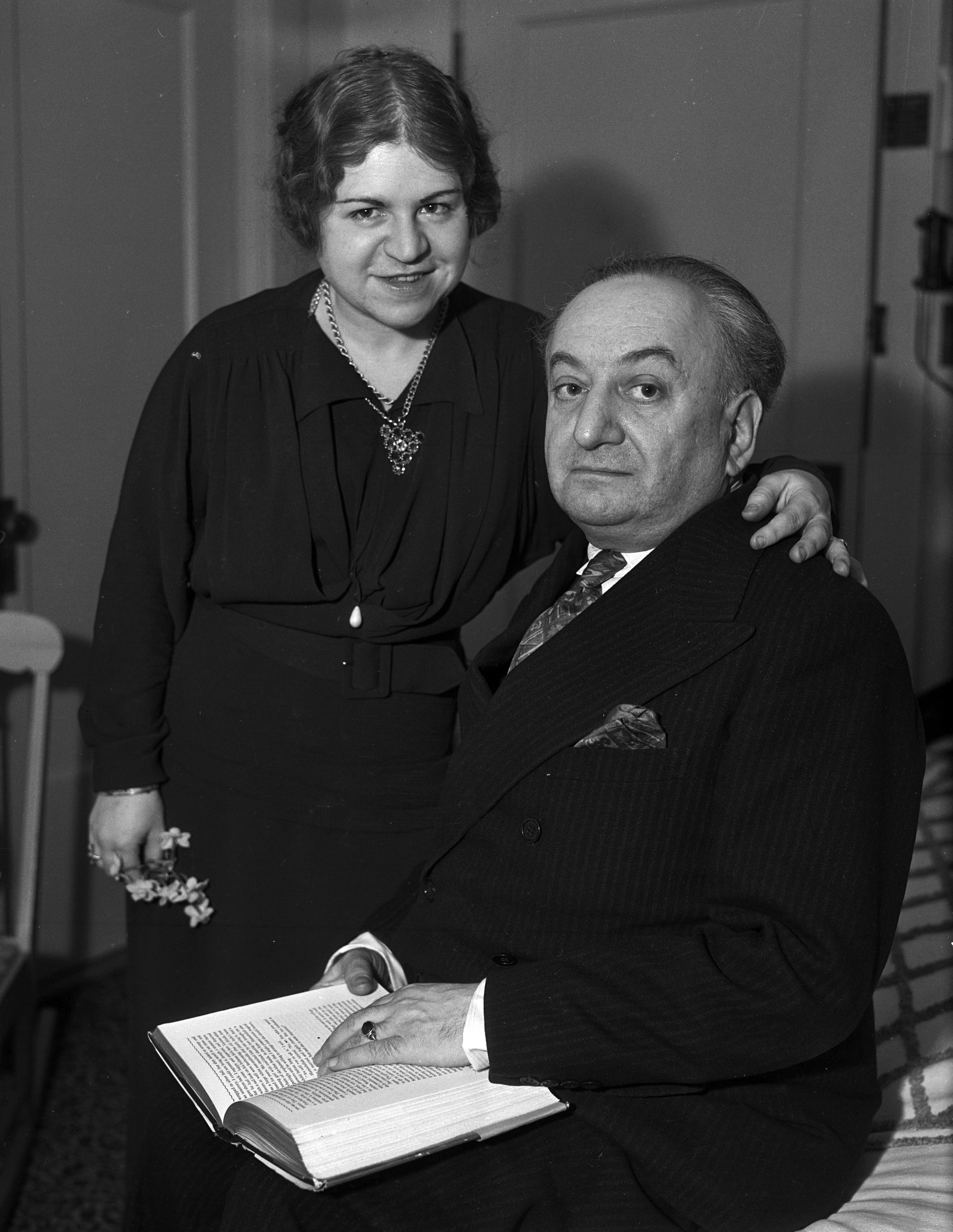
- Lewisohn and his first wife Mary Arnold, 1936
- Born: Ludwig Lewisohn; May 30, 1882; Berlin, Germany
- Died: December 31, 1955 (aged 73); Miami Beach, Florida, U.S.
- Education: College of Charleston (BA); Columbia University (MA)
- Occupation: Novelist
- Spouses: Mary Arnold (divorced); Edna Manley (m. 1940, divorced); Louise Wolk (m. 1944–1955)
- Writing career
- Period: 1905–1955
- Genre: Literary fiction

Ludwig Lewisohn (May 30, 1882 – December 31, 1955) was a novelist, literary critic, the drama critic for The Nation and then its associate editor. He was the editor of the New Palestine, an American Zionist journal. He taught at the University of Wisconsin and at Ohio State University as well as serving as professor of German and Comparative Literature at Brandeis University. Lewisohn produced some 40 full-length fiction and non-fiction books, nearly as many translations, wrote numerous magazine and journal articles and edited countless other written works.

== Early life and education ==
Lewisohn was born in Berlin, Germany to a highly assimilated, upper-middle class Jewish family. His parents Jacques Lewisohn and Minna (Eloesser) immigrated to the United States in 1890 when he was 7-years-old. The family settled in St. Matthews, South Carolina and then in 1892 moved to Charleston. Lewisohn's mother was the daughter of a rabbi, but when the family moved to America they settled in an area where there was not a practicing Jewish congregation. He was sent to a Methodist Sunday school to improve his English. He integrated well into the Methodist community and its church and subsequently became an active Methodist. After graduating with honors from the College of Charleston, he went to Columbia University in 1902 to continue with graduate work. He received the degree of A.M. in 1903.

== Career ==
In 1904 he was told by his advisers that a Jew would never be hired to teach English literature at an American university. The bitter irony in this advice led Lewisohn to return to Judaism and he became an outspoken critic of American Jewish assimilation. In 1948 Lewisohn was among the founding faculty members of Brandeis University where he taught until his death.

Following his graduation from Columbia, Lewisohn worked for Doubleday, Page & Co. in New York as a member of the editorial staff. The following year, 1905, he left Doubleday to become a free-lance magazine writer. In 1910, with the strong recommendation of his close friend William Ellery Leonard he became an instructor of German at the University of Wisconsin. He remained there for one year and then accepted the position of professor of German language and literature at Ohio State University. He served at the university until 1917 when war time sentiments forced his separation. Upon leaving Ohio State University Lewisohn became drama critic at the Nation and then was promoted to associate editor in 1920. He continued to write for The Nation until 1924. His writing in the 1920s attracted admiration from Thomas Mann and Sigmund Freud. His 1928 novel, The Island Within was praised by critic John Chamberlain: " [the novel] ought to shape up as among the finest written by an American in this decade."

He translated from the German into English works of Gerhart Hauptmann, Jakob Wassermann and Franz Werfel.

In 1943 he became the editor of the New Palestine, working with them until 1948. He then began his work at Brandeis University.

Lewisohn was a member of the Jewish Academy of Arts and Sciences and was an honorary secretary of the Zionist Organization of America. Lewisohn strongly supported the Zionist cause and he lectured and wrote widely on its behalf.

Writing in the June 1947 issue of Commentary, Meyer Levin argued that the literary careers of himself, Lewisohn, Maurice Samuel, Daniel Fuchs, and Irving Fineman had been constrained by limited reader and publishing‑industry interest in works that engaged with Jewish or Zionist themes. This was reiterated by Norman Podhoretz writing in the October 1998 issue of Commentary: "he [Lewisohn] became a virtual nonperson in the literary world after espousing Zionism and writing in his novels both openly and in a “positive” spirit about Jews and the Jewish experience."

== Personal life ==
When he first came to Columbia, Lewisohn had an affair with George Sylvester Viereck. He was married three times. He married Mary Arnold, an English-born writer in 1906. He became a stepfather to her three children from her first marriage. This marriage ended in divorce and he married Edna Manley in 1940, also ending in divorce. He married Louise Wolk in 1944 and was survived in death by his third wife. Lewisohn also had a son, James Elias Lewisohn, by Thelma Spear, a concert singer with whom he had lived and had a relationship with for many years. Spear actually burst in on his wedding to Edna Manley at a Baltimore synagogue, insisting that he first marry and then divorce her or she would sue him for bigamy. Lewisohn died of a heart attack in Miami Beach, Florida on December 31, 1955.

== Selected bibliography ==
- The Broken Snare (1908)
- A Night in Alexandria (1909)
- Up Stream (1922)
- The Creative Life (1924)
- Israel (1925)
- The Case of Mr. Crump (1926)
- The Island Within (1928)
- Expression in America (1931)
- The Last Days of Shylock (1931) Illustrated by Arthur Szyk
- Rebirth (1935)
- Trumpet of Jubilee (1937)
- He commented on: "The Jew and the Book", in Samuel Caplan and Harold U. Ribalow, ed., The Great Jewish Books (New York, Horizon, 1952), pp. 11–17.
