= Shlomo Herberg =

- שלמה הרברג
- Born: Shlomo Yosef ben Gershon Herberg; Autumn 1884; Kudirkos Naumiestis, Lithuania
- Died: 1966; Tel Aviv, Israel
- Resting place: Kiryat Shaul Cemetery, Tel Aviv, Israel
- Occupations: Poet; author; translator; writer; teacher
- Years active: Unknown–1966
- Spouse: Miriam Orinowski (m. Unknown-January 1953) (her death)

Shlomo Herberg (Hebrew: שלמה הרברג; 1884–1966) was an Israeli poet, writer translator, writer of Hebrew literature, and teacher of Lithuanian Jewish descent, who was born in what is now Kudirkos Naumiestis, Lithuania. He was one of the first professional Hebrew translators in Israel and won the Tchernichovsky Prize for Model Translations in 1960. He published many poems, books, songs, stories, and lists.

== Early life ==
Shlomo Yosef ben Gershon Herberg was born in the autumn of 1884 in what is now the town of Kudirkos Naumiestis in Lithuania, but was at the time was נײַשטאָט־שאַקי (Nayshtot-Shaki) in Yiddish, Naumiestis in Lithuanian, Władysławów in Polish, and later became the Kudirkos Naumiestis near the city of Władysławów, [Shakhi] in the [Sobalak] Shire in the west the Russian Empire, in the region of [Poland] – Lithuania.

He received a traditional Torah education in Cheder and was later educated in the most important Yeshivot forLithuanian Jewry, Yeshivas The Slobodka Yeshiva, and the Volozhin Yeshiva Volozhin. Afterward, he prepared himself for general education, studied for two years in the Hebrew Pedagogical Courses for the teachers of Aharon Kahnstam and Shalom Yonah Tcharna in Grodno, and was ordained to teach. He was married to Miriam Orinowski, a pioneer in the Hebrew language school of the Hebrew University of Jerusalem.

== Career ==
Zionist, he requested to immigrate to Eretz Israel. He came to the city of Constantinople in [Turkey], and in [1920] the Third Aliya succeeded in obtaining the support of [Aharon Ze'ev Ben-Yishai], who headed the Pioneers who were waiting there to receive a certificate from the head of the Immigration Committee Ze'ev Tiomkin. In Israel he worked for several years as a teacher in various schools in Petah Tikva and in Tel Aviv. Afterward, he devoted himself to the translation work, and was one of the first Hebrew translators. Translated from various languages (mainly from Russian and German), and also from [Yiddish] and more. Translate nearly 40 books, including fiction novels and stories), children's literature and reference books.

In addition, he sent an original literary work. His first works appeared in [1902] in the children's newspaper Olam Katan, published in [Warsaw]. Published [poetry], prose, and lists in various newspapers and magazines, among them "[The Hedges]," "Hapoel HaTza'ir, " [The World (Weekly), The World], " The Land of Israel, "and" The Musafim. " At the end of his life, his works were collected for his book "In the Circle" (Tel Aviv: [Notebooks for Literature (Book Publishing).

In 1960, Herberg was awarded the Tchernichovsky Prize for Fine Translation of Literature for the translation of "Days of Days" to Dostoevsky.

Herberg lived with his wife on 22 Hissin Street in Tel Aviv. The couple had no children. In January 1953 his wife died. In his last years he lived alone in a one-room apartment he owned in 21 Ben Zion Boulevard in Tel Aviv.

== Death ==
He died in the spring of 1966. He was buried in the Kiryat Shaul Cemetery next to his wife.

== Books ==
- In a Circle: Poems, Songs in Prose and Lists, Tel Aviv: Notebooks for Literature (Hebrew)

=== Translations ===
- "Tolstoy, Kreutzer Sonata (Tolstoy): A novel; Translation: S. Herberg, Jerusalem: [Published by Mitzpe and Mitzpe] ('Sefer Mizpe: Prose Books'), 1926. (from Russian)
- Cover Gorky, Puma Gordiev; Translation: S. Herberg, 2 volumes, Jerusalem: Mitzpe (Sefer Mizpe: Prose books), 1927. (from Russian)

" Hissin, One of the Belonging Skills, translated by S. Herberg, Tel Aviv: The General Federation of Hebrew Workers in Eretz Israel – Culture Committee. (From Russian)

- Ebers ->, Pharaoh's daughter: historical novel; Translate: ש. Herberg, 2 volumes, Tel Aviv: Art, art, 1928. (German)
- Dostoevsky, Idiot: novel '; Translation of S. Herberg, 2 volumes, Jerusalem – Tel Aviv: Mitzpe (Tarbut Library), 1929. (from Russian)
- "[Demons] (Book) Demons: A Novel", S. Herberg, 2 Volumes, Jerusalem – Tel Aviv: Mitzpe (Tarbut Library), 1930. (From Russian)
- C. Evers, Varda; Translate: ש. Herberg, 3 volumes, Tel Aviv: Art, 1930. (story) (German)
- Ruth Rold, "Janco – The Boy from Mexico"; Translated: S. Herberg, Tel Aviv: Mitzpe, 1931. (for children)

"Schubert," "Nevertheless, No Moving", translated by S. Herberg, 2 Volumes, Tel Aviv: Art (Library for All), 1932.

- Assad Bey [= [Lev Nussimbaum]] ->, Blood and Oil in the East; Translation: S. Herberg, Tel Aviv: Mitzpe, 1932.

Sigurd Christiansen is a living and one who dies: a novel; Translated: S. Herberg, Tel Aviv: Mitzpe, 1933.

- Ehrenburg, Unified Front; Translated by S. Herberg, Tel Aviv: [Stiebel Publishing House], 1933. (from Russian)
- Zweig, Marie Antoinette Translation from German: S. Herberg, 2 Volumes, Tel Aviv: Mitzpe, 1934. (German)
- Covering Gorky, "'Artemonov House Factory' 'translated from Russian: S. Herberg, Tel Aviv: Israel Shtibel, 1934. (from Russian)
- Chernobyl, Trends in Socialism; Translation: S. Herberg, Tel Aviv: The Youth Center of the Histadrut in Eretz Israel ("The Library for the Guide"), 1935. (Booklet A: "Classical Marxism: Coalitionism and Social Reformism")
- Sylvania, Celia Slave: novel '; Translated: S. Herberg, Tel Aviv: Mitzpeh, 1935.
- Eli Bertha, Students; Translated by: S. Herberg, Tel Aviv: Israel Shtibel, 1935. Review: דבר | מר-דרור | "Students", 1935/08/02, 00903 Stories for Children) (German)
- Miriam Singer, airplane in the country; Translated from Manuscripts: S. Herberg, Tel Aviv: Stiebel, 1936. (Story for Children) (German)
- Ethel Lilian Vinnich, Friendship ended: a novel , translated by S. Herberg, Tel Aviv : Mitzpe, 1936. (English) (additional edition: Tel Aviv: Idit, 1946. Review: Yohanan Pograbinsky, Translated Literature: A. "Friendship terminated", 1955/09/23, 00603
- Jacob Dinezon, Hershele: Count; Translation: S. Herberg, 2 Volumes, Tel Aviv: Mitzpe, 1937. (Yiddish)
- Jacob Dinezon, Two cubits: a novel; Translated: S. Herberg, Tel Aviv: Mitzpe, 1937. (Yiddish)
- Hesse, Peter Kamenzind Translated from German: S. Herberg, Tel Aviv: Massada (Book Publishing) With the assistance of The Bialik Institute (The Ramon Booklet), 1941. (German) (in a new editing by Yotam Reuveni: Jerusalem and Tel Aviv: [Schocken, Schocken]
- Yom Tov Batu, "Don Joseph Nasi: Parshat Chaim"; Translated from the German Handbook: S. Herberg, Tel Aviv: Massada; With the assistance of the Bialik Institute ("The Ramon Library"), 1942.
- Jacob Leszczynski, "The Jews in Soviet Russia: From the October Revolution to World War II"; Translated: S. Herberg, Tel Aviv: Am Oved.
- Eli Bertha, Little Joanna Mexican and Little Black Lori: Little Childhood Stories; Translated: S. Herberg, Tel Aviv: Mitzpe, 1944. (for children)
- Maxim Gorky, Stories about Italy; Translate: S. Herberg, Ein Harod: "The United States of America".
- S. Williams, "Fundamentals of Soil Work", translated from Russian: S. Herberg, The Proofreading and Editing of Agricultural Terms by [Uriya Feldman], Tel Aviv: Hakibbutz Hameuchad, 1946.
- Bogdanov, Political Economy Theory; Translated from Russian: S. Herberg, Tel Aviv: Hakibbutz Hameuhad, 1946.
- Moshe Mendelssohn, Jerusalem; Little Writings on Jewish and Jewish Affairs; With an introduction by [Nathan Rotenstreich], Tel Aviv: Massada; Back with the participation of the Bialik Institute, 1947. ("Yerushalayim" translated from German: S. Herberg, small writings: [Yitzchak Leib Baruch])
- Timmermans -> Peter Brueghel Translated by: Shlomo Herberg, Tel Aviv: Am Oved (The Book of Shacharut), 1948.
- Leonid Leonov ->, The Thief: Roman; Translated by S. Harberg, Tel Aviv: Am Oved (Lorem Library), 1949. (from Russian)
- "['Klimant Arkadyevich Timuriyazov],' 'T. Darwin and his Torah' ', from Russian: S. Herberg, ed., D. Zitsk, Tel Aviv: Hakibbutz Hameuhad, 1950. (From Russian)
- Maxim Gorky, Loyles Samgin: Romance; From Russian: S. Herberg, 3 volumes, Merhavia: HaKibbutz HaArtzi Hashomer Hatzair ("Every Worker's Book"): 1950–1951.
- Trojan Lysenko, Agrobiology, scientific editing: S. Horowitz, translated by S. Harberg, [Aharon Reuveni] Aviv: Hakibbutz Hameuhad, 1952. (from Russian)

[AntoLe Vinogradov], Three Colors of Time: Roman; Hebrew: S. Herberg, A. Gilboa, 2 volumes, Merhavia: HaKibbutz HaArtzi Hashomer Hatzair (Sefer Poalim for All), 1952–1953. (From Russian)

- Gorky, Writings; Translated by many translators, 3 volumes, Merhavia: Sifriat Poalim ("The Books of Mofet"), 1953–1959 – Herberg translated "My Universities", in volume in 1954; And "Puma Gordiev" and "Artamanov House", in volume III, 1959.
- Martin Andersen-Nexa, Fela the Conqueror; S. Harberg, 4 volumes, Merhavia: Hakibbutz Ha'Artzi Hashomer Hatzair (Sifriat Poalim: All), 1955.
- FM Dostoyevsky, The Age of Days: Roman; (Translated from Hebrew) by Michael Harold, Tel Aviv: Hakibbutz Hameuchad Publishing House, 1959. Note: Review by Michael Ohad, Dostoevsky's New Book, 1959/03/06, 02503
- Avner Holtzman and Yitzhak Kafkafi (eds.), The writings of Micha Yosef Berdichevsky Ben Grion, 10 volumes, Tel Aviv: Hakibbutz Hameuhad, 1996–2011 – Volume 10: Avner Holtzman (ed.), Articles in Yiddish, Articles in German, Reflections from the Diary; Translated by: Itzhak Kafkafi, Shlomo Herberg, Menachem Zalman Wolfowski, Yosef Even, 2011.

== Read more ==
- 'Herberg, Shlomo', in Uriel Ofek, Lexicon Ofek Children's Literature , Tel Aviv: Zmora-Bitan.
