= Levana Moshon =

Israeli journalist, teacher and author

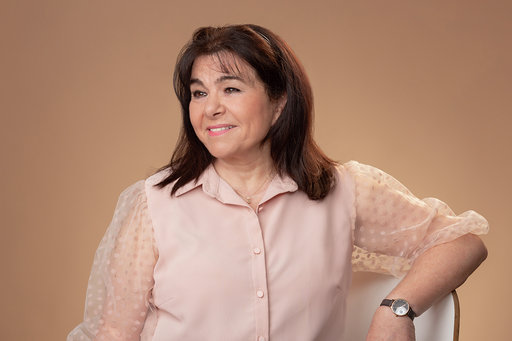
Levana Moshon (2020)

Levana Moshon (Hebrew: לבנה מושון, also Hebrew: לבנה מושון-קוזק, Levana Moshon-Kozak) (born October 28, 1952, Tel Aviv) is an Israeli writer, journalist, teacher and children's storyteller.

== Biography ==
Levana Moshon is married and mother of three. She lives in Giv'at Shmuel.

== Literary career ==
Moshon is the author of over 40 books of prose for children and young adults, and several novels for adults.

== Awards and recognition ==
- 2022: Prime Minister's Prize for Hebrew Literary Works (for 2021)
- 2015: nominated for the Sapir Prize (for 2014) for the adult novel Silence of the Plants ("שתיקת הצמחים")
- 2009: ACUM Prize for the manuscript, presented anonymously, "האם אתה כואב אותי" ("You are Hurting Me" also translated as "Feel my Pains")
- 2005: ACUM Prize for children's and youth literature for the 2004 novel "לאבא שלי קוראים ארווין" ("My Father is Called Erwin"), which was republished in 2008 as מכתבים מגבעת הזבל (Letters from the Garbage Heap)
- 1995: Tchernichovsky Prize in Poetry and Prose category, for the book Sour Love (published in 1996)
