= Tal Nitzán =

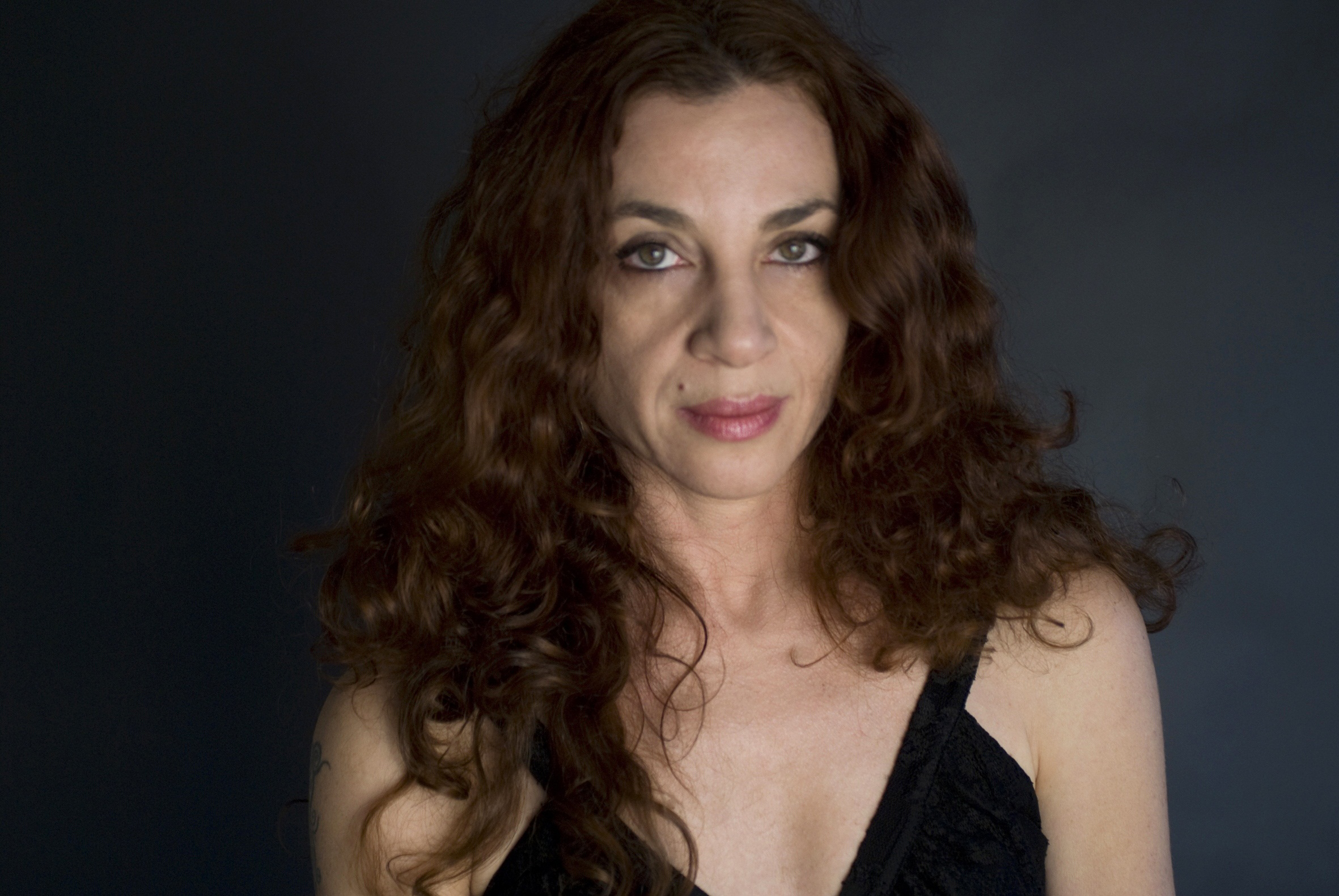
Tal Nitzán (by Iris Nesher)

Tal Nitzán (Hebrew: טל ניצן) is an Israeli poet, writer, translator and editor.

== Early life and education ==
Nitzán was born in Jaffa in November 9, 1961 and has lived in Bogotá, Buenos Aires, and New York City. She now resides in Tel Aviv. She holds a BA in art history and Latin American studies and an MA in literature from the Hebrew University of Jerusalem.

== Literary work ==
Nitzán has published eight poetry books, two novels, a short story collection and eight children's books, and has edited three poetry anthologies: two are selections of Latin-American poetry and one, 'With an Iron Pen', is a collection of Hebrew protest poetry. Her poems have been translated to more than 20 languages, and various selections of her work have been published in English, German, Spanish, French, Portuguese, Italian, Turkish and Lithuanian.

Nitzán has translated to Hebrew over 80 works in prose, poetry, and drama, from Spanish and English. She was also editor in chief of "Latino", a series of Latin American literature in translation, of "Mekomi" ("Local" in Hebrew), a series for original Hebrew prose, both for major Israeli publishers, and of the independent literary magazine "Orot" ("lights" in Hebrew). She is a founding editor of the Israeli National Library's online literary magazine, "Ha-Mussach" ("The Garage").

Nitzán has been awarded many Israeli literary prizes (such as The Prime Minister's Prize for writers, the women's writers' prize, awards for beginning poets and for debut poetry book, the Tchernichovsky Prize for exemplary translation and more) and has participated in various local and international poetry festivals.

== Selected bibliography ==
Poetry books in Hebrew:

- "Doméstica", 2002
- "An Ordinary Evening", 2006
- "Café Soleil Bleu", 2007
- "The First to Forget", 2009
- "Look at the same Cloud twice", 2012
- "To the inner Court" (bi-lingual Hebrew-English, with artist Tsibi Geva), 2015
- "Atlantis", 2019
- "The Forest We Invented", 2025

Poetry Selections in Translation:

- "Penki langai į sodą" (Lithuania, 2009), various translators.
- "Architettura d'interni" (Franco Puzzo Editore, Italia, 2010), translation: Jack Arbib.
- "Soirée ordinaire" (Al Manar, France, 2011), various translators.
- "Dans l'esquif étroit" (with artist Guy Paul Chauder, Al Manar, France, 2011).
- "Vago" (Pen Press, Argentina-USA, 2012), translation: Gerardo Lewin.
- "Animale Notturno" (Il Laboratorio, Italia, 2013), translation: Jack Arbib.
- "El tercer niño" (Pen Press, Argentina-USA, 2013), various translators.
- "With an Iron Pen", Anthology of Hebrew Protest Poetry, (SUNY Press, USA, 2009), English version by Rachel Tzvia Beck.
- "D'un burin de fer", Anthologie de poésie israélienne engagée (Al Manar, France, 2013), traduction de Isabelle Dotan.
- "O Ponto da Ternura" (Lumme Editore, Brasil, 2013), translation: Moacir Amancio.
- "At the End of Sleep" (Restless books, 2014, e-book), various translators.
- "To the inner Court" (with artist Tsibi Geva, Even Hoshen Books 2015), various translators.
- "Zu Deiner Frage" (Verlagshaus Berlin, 2015, Illustrations: Jul Gordon), translation: Gundula Schiffer.
- "Deux fois le même nuage" (Al Manar, France, 2016), with artist Albert Woda, various translators.
- "La misma nube dos veces" (Buenos aires Poetry, 2019), various translators.
- "Atlântida" (Ars et Vita, Brasil, 2022), various translators.
- "Con cincel de hierro", Antología bilingüe de poesía de protesta, (insensata, España, 2022), traducción: Gerardo Lewin.
- "Gecenin Çiyi Vurmuş Otlara" (SRC, Istambul, 2025), translation: Gökçenur Çelebioğlu.

Novels:

- "Each and every Child", Achuzat Bayit books, 2015
- "The last Passenger", Am Oved, 2020

Short Story Collection:

- "How to overcome Sadness in three Steps", Afik, 2021.

As editor:

- "With an Iron Pen", an anthology of Hebrew anti-occupation poetry (1984–2004), 2005

(English version published by SUNY Press, USA, 2009; French version by Al-Manar, 2013; Spanish version by insensata, 2022).

Literary Translation

Nitzán is one of Israel's most prominent translators of Hispanic literature. She has translated to Hebrew over 80 books, from Spanish and English.

In 2004 she received an honorary medal from the President of Chile for her translation of Pablo Neruda's poetry.
