= Eisig Silberschlag =

Hebrew poet, translator and literary critic

- Born: January 8, 1903; Stry, Galicia, Austria-Hungary
- Died: September 30, 1988 (aged 85); Austin, Texas, United States
- Resting place: Mount of Olives Jewish Cemetery
- Education: University of Vienna
- Spouse: Milkah Antler (died 1971)
- Writing career
- Language: Hebrew
- Notable awards: Lamed Prize for Hebrew Literature (1943); Tchernichovsky Prize (1951); Florence and Harry Kovner Memorial Award (1960)

Academic work
- Discipline: Judaic studies
- Institutions: Hebrew College; University of Texas at Austin

Eisig Silberschlag (Hebrew: יצחק זילברשלג; January 8, 1903 – September 30, 1988) was a Galician-born American Hebrew poet, translator, and literary critic. He received the Tchernichovsky Prize in 1951 for his translations of Aristophanes and Menander into Hebrew.

== Biography ==
Eisig (Yitzhak) Silberschlag was born in Stry, eastern Galicia, to Ḥasidic parents Bertha (née Pomerantz) and David Silberschlag. He studied Greek and Latin in the local gymnasium, and was active in the Hashomer Hatzair movement. Silberschlag immigrated with his family to New York City in 1920, publishing his first poem in the weekly Hadar in 1925. That same year he returned to Europe, where he completed a doctorate at the University of Vienna with a dissertation on Anglo-Russian relations during the reign of Catherine the Great.

He died at the age of 85 at St. David's Hospital in Austin, and was buried at the Mount of Olives Cemetery in Jerusalem.

== Academic and literary career ==
In the early 1930s, Silberschlag taught at the Jewish Institute of Religion and at the Teachers Institute of the Jewish Theological Seminary. He published his first volume of poetry, Bi-shevilim bodedim, in 1931. He also edited, along with Aaron Zeitlin, several volumes of the Hebrew quarterly Ha-Tekufah.

Silberschlag joined the faculty of Hebrew College in 1944, rising to become dean, in which role he oversaw the college's accreditation from the New England Association of Schools and Colleges, and then president. Silberschlag was a candidate to succeed Joseph Klausner as chair of modern Hebrew literature at the Hebrew University upon the latter's retirement, but remained in the United States when Simon Halkin was hired in this position.

After his retirement and the death of his wife Milkah, Silberschlag moved from Boston to Austin, Texas, where he was appointed professor of Hebrew literature at the University of Texas at Austin. During this period he also served as president of the National Association of Professors of Hebrew.

== Published works ==
=== In Hebrew ===
- Bi-shevilim bodedim: shirim [On Solitary Paths] (in Hebrew). New York: Ogen. 1931.
- Yehudah Halevi: poʼemah [Judah Halevi] (in Hebrew). Tel Aviv: Gilyonot. 1935.
- Tehiyah u-teḥiyah ba-shirah: masot [Astonishment and Renewal in Poetry] (in Hebrew). Warsaw: Avraham Yosef Shtibel. 1938.
- Mi-pi kushim [From the Mouths of Blacks] (in Hebrew). New York: Ḥamol. 1938.
- Sefer Turov [Book of Touroff] (in Hebrew). Boston: Hotsaʼat Bet ha-midrash le-morim. 1938. Editor, with Yoḥanan Twersky.
- Sheva panim le-Ḥavvah [Seven Faces of Eve] (in Hebrew). 1939.
- Bi-yemei Isabella [In the Days of Isabella] (in Hebrew). 1941.
- Aleh, olam, be-shir [Ascend, Oh World, in Song] (in Hebrew). New York: Ogen. 1947.
- Kimron yamai: shirim [The Arc of My Days] (in Hebrew). Jerusalem: Kiryat-sefer. 1959.
- Igrotai el dorot aḥerim: shirim [Letters to Other Generations] (in Hebrew). Jerusalem: Kiryat-sefer. 1971.
- Yesh reshit le-khol aḥarit: shirim [Each End Has a Beginning] (in Hebrew). Jerusalem: Kiryat-sefer. 1976.
- Ben alimut u-ven adishut [Between Violence and Indifference] (in Hebrew). Jerusalem: R. Mass. 1981.

=== In English ===
- Hebrew Literature: An Evaluation. Herzl Institute pamphletno. 12. New York: Herzl Institute. 1959.
- Saul Tschernichowsky: Poet of Revolt. Translated by Kahn, Sholom Jacob. London: East and West Library. 1968.
- From Renaissance to Renaissance: Hebrew Literature from 1492–1970. Vol. I. New York: Ktav Publishing House. 1973.
- From Renaissance to Renaissance: Hebrew Literature in the Land of Israel, 1870–1970. Vol. II. New York: Ktav Publishing House. 1977.
- Thirty Years of Hebrew Literature Under Independence, 1948–1978. Manchester: John Rylands University Library of Manchester. 1981.
- Naphtali Herz Imber (1856-1909), Judaism: A Quarterly Journal of Jewish Life and Thought, vol. 5, no. 2, Spring 1956

=== Translations ===
- Paul the Silentiary (1945). Shire ahavah [Love Poems] (in Hebrew). New York: Histadrut ha-ʻIvrit be-Amerikah.
- de Haas, Carl (1945). Birinikah: tragediʼah be-ḥamesh maʻarakhot [Berenice: Tragedy in Five Acts] (in Hebrew). New York: Avraham Yosef Shtibel.
- Aristophanes (1950). Tsiporim: ha-ḳomedyah [The Birds] (in Hebrew). Tel Aviv: Devir.
- Aristophanes (1951). Plutos [Plutus] (in Hebrew). Tel Aviv: Devir.
- Aristophanes (1951). Komedyot [Comedies] (in Hebrew). Tel Aviv: Devir.
- Aristophanes (1959). ʻAnanim [The Clouds] (in Hebrew). Tel Aviv: Masadah.
- Aristophanes (1959). Tsefardeʻim: ḳomedyah [The Frogs] (in Hebrew). Tel Aviv: Masadah.
- Aristophanes (1967). Aḥat esreh komedyot [Eleven Comedies] (in Hebrew). Tel Aviv: Masadah.
- Menander (1985). Ḥamishah maḥazot [Five Plays] (in Hebrew). Jerusalem: Mosad Bialik.
