= Histadrut Ivrit of America =

The Histadruth Ivrith of America (1916 - 2005) was part of the movement for the revival of the Hebrew language that sought to revive Hebrew, a language then used for prayer and the study of holy texts, as a living language that would be spoken and used to create contemporary literature.

The Histadrut held its first annual congress in New York in 1917; Eliezer Ben-Yehuda, the father of modern Hebrew, David Ben-Gurion and Itzhak Ben-Zvi attended.

Beginning in 1921, Histadrut published Hadoar, an American Hebrew newspaper that was distributed nationwide.

In its early year, Histadrut published a Sefer Hashanah Le-Yehude Amerika (Yearbook for the Jews of America); a large format annual with literary and scholarly essays, and journalistic accounts of the year's developments in American Jewish life.

Ogen (anchor), the Histadrut publishing house was founded in 1920. Over the decades it published more than 60 works of literature and scholarship. Among the most notable was the Anthology of Hebrew Poetry in America (1938), which included poems from several centuries of American Jewish life.

A youth movement, Histadruth Hanoar Haivri, was established in 1936.

Beginning in the 1930s, and intensifying after Israeli independence, Histradut sponsored dance groups, camping, ulpan for teaching Hebrew language, choral groups, the Pargod theater group and other cultural and recreational activities. The Hebrew Arts Foundation was established in 1952, followed by a Hebrew Arts School.

The organization was disbanded in 2005.

Michael Weingrad describes the Histradrut Hebraists as linguistically and ideologically "marginal," because the Hebrew revival was centered in Yiddish-speaking Ashkenaz and continued in Israel. He describes the story of the Histadrut after Israeli independence as "the steady decline in the fortunes of an already small group." However, Weingrad points out that the movement produced a few notable Hebrew poets, Gabriel Preil, Eisig Silberschlag and Robert Whitehill.
