= Louis Lipsky =

President of the Zionist Organization of America

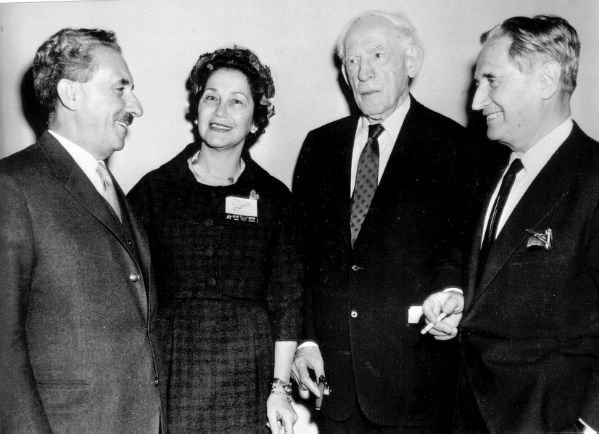
(From left to right) Moshe Sharett, Miriam Freund-Rosenthal, Louis Lipsky, and Nahum Goldmann in 1960

Louis Lipsky (November 30, 1876 – May 27, 1963) was an American Zionist leader, President of the Zionist Organization of America, magazine editor, and author of books on Jewish culture and politics.

== Biography ==
Louis Lipsky was born in Rochester, New York in 1876 to Polish Jewish immigrant parents.

He had three sons: David Lipsky, a theatrical press agent, Eleazar Lipsky, a novelist, and Joel Carmichael, a historian. His grandson is Richard Lipsky, a lobbyist and author of the seminal book on politics and sports: How We play the Game (Beacon Press); great-granddaughter is the filmmaker Emily Carmichael. His sister, Lena, married economist and congressman Meyer Jacobstein. Lipsky has constantly called attention to the plight of European Jewry at Nazi Germany requesting to organize their rescue. Already in 1931, Lipsky warned of menace to Jews if Hitler wins. As he's representing the "darkest forces of rampant chauvinism."

== Journalism career ==
Lipsky began his career as a reporter in Rochester, NY along with his brother Abraham, working at a local paper for 13 months. He eventually moved to New York City in 1900 where he joined the staff of the New York Morning Telegraph as a reporter covering theater news and serving as a drama critic. Lipsky was the editor of the magazine, The American Hebrew, from 1900 to 1914 and periodically the editor of The Maccabean-magazine (later became The New Palestine (magazine)).

== Zionist activism ==
He left the magazine to become secretary of the Federation of American Zionists, the organization that would become the ZOA, and in that capacity edited the first Zionist publication in English, The Maccabean. He was Chairman of the ZOA from 1922 to 1930 and served as its President from 1926 to 1930. The ascension of Lipsky to Chairman and President of the ZOA was part of a power struggle against the leadership of Louis Brandeis over issues of structural organization and financial planning and came about in part due to the influence and support of Chaim Weizmann who preferred Lipsky's candidacy. The "Lipsky" and "Brandeis" factions of Zionism were reconciled in 1930 when an eighteen member administrative council, split equally between their respective supporters, was elected to govern the ZOA.

Lipsky's first collection of essays on Zionism was published in 1927 as The Selected Works of Louis Lipsky and reprinted in 1977 as Thirty Years of American Zionism. He also published Gallery of Zionist Profiles (1956), an early history of the Zionist Movement told through profiles of its leaders and thinkers, and Tales of the Yiddish Rialto: Reminiscences of Playwrights and Players in New York's Jewish Theatre (1962).

== See also ==
- The New Palestine (magazine)
