= Samuel Caplan =

American magazine editor

Samuel Caplan (March 10, 1895 – May 6, 1969) was an American magazine editor.

Caplan was born in the Russian Empire on March 10, 1895, and in 1905 moved to the United States. He attended the University of Pittsburgh and the Columbia University Graduate School of Journalism.

Caplan began writing no later than 1920. In the early 1920s he was editor of the Boston newspaper The Jewish Leader, which was published in both English and Yiddish. Caplan edited the New Palestine magazine in 1934. From 1940 to his retirement, in 1966, Caplan was editor of the Congress Weekly magazine. After retiring, he was elected as member "at-large".

In the end of 1943, Caplan replaced Lillie Shultz as secretary to the governing council of the American Jewish Congress.

Caplan, with Harold U. Ribalow, was an editor of the book The Great Jewish Books and Their Influence on History (1952).

Caplan was married to Hannah Caplan (née Levin) and had two sons, Joseph and Leonard. He died on May 6, 1969, in Woodmere, Long Island, New York.
