= Charles E. Shulman =

Russian-American rabbi and attorney

Charles Emanuel Shulman (July 25, 1900 – June 2, 1968) was a Russian-American rabbi and attorney.

== Biography ==
Shulman was born in Berdichev, Ukraine, (then the Russian Empire), on July 25, 1900 (although his official Russian birth certificate, presented to the family following his death, recorded his birth date as July 3, 1898), one of six children of Rachel Nemerov Shulman, who brought her six children to the United States in 1904, around the time his father Maurice (Elimelech) died, and settled in Cleveland, Ohio.

Shulman studied at Ohio Northern University from 1916–1920 and received a Bachelor of Law degree in 1920. and was admitted to the Ohio state ba. He attended the University of Cincinnati 1922–23. From 1923–24, he studied at the University of Chicago where he received his Ph.B (Bachelor of Philosophy). He received his M.A. in Comparative Religion from the same university in 1930. He studied at the Hebrew Union College in Cincinnati, Ohio, from 1922–27 and was ordained as a Reform rabbi in 1927.

Shulman worked as a lawyer for railroad companies in the early 1920s. He was a rabbi in Johnstown, Pennsylvania (1926–27) and at Congregation Leshem Shomayim in Wheeling, West Virginia (1927–1931). From 1931 until 1946, he was the rabbi of the North Shore Congregation Israel, Glencoe, Illinois, which he left to become the founding rabbi of Riverdale Temple, The Liberal Synagogue, in the Riverdale section of the Bronx, where he presided from 1947 until his death in 1968.

== World War II ==
Shulman enlisted in the U.S. Navy in 1943 and served as chaplain at Newport, Quonset and Camp Endicott in Rhode Island. He was the sole Jewish Naval chaplain in New England at that time.

From November 1944 to October 1945, he served as the first Jewish chaplain and the only rabbi among 225 chaplains in the Seventh Fleet in the South Pacific Theater of Operations, commanded by Admiral Thomas C. Kinkaid.

In 1945, he received the Navy Commendation Award for outstanding service overseas. He completed his naval service in January 1946. He was awarded the Service Recognition Certificate Citation for Meritorious Service by the State of Illinois in 1947. He was honorably discharged from the Navy on January 25, 1951.

== Positions and honors ==
- Recipient George Washington Medal Freedom Foundation, 1953,1954,1955, 1961 and 1963 for outstanding sermons.
- Honorary Doctorate, Ohio Northern University, (1954);
- Honorary Doctorate, Hebrew Union College Jewish Institute of Religion, 1956;
- Honorary Doctorate, Boston University (1959)

== Works ==
=== Books ===
- Problems of Jews in the Contemporary World (1934)
- Europe's Conscience in Decline (1939)
- What It Means to Be a Jew (1960)

=== Other publications ===
- Religion's Message in a War- Torn World (1942)
- The Test of a Civilization (1947)
- On Being a Jew (1954)
- A People that Did Not Die, (1956)
- The Best Years of Our Lives (1958)
- Humanity's Unfinished Business (1964)

He also wrote pamphlets of commentary on the liturgy and on traditional chants, among them “On the Sabbath,” “On the Holydays” and a “Book of Remembrance ” for the Yom Kippur memorial services.

His papers and diaries are held by the Jacob Radar Marcus Center of the American Jewish Archives, Hebrew Union College, Cincinnati, Ohio.

== Family ==
He was married to the Jewish educator Avis Clamitz (1908-1991), with whom he had a daughter. Deborah Shulman Sherman
