= Claude Lapointe (illustrator) =

French illustrator and schoolteacher (1938–2024)

- Born: 3 December 1938; Rémilly, France
- Died: 6 October 2024 (aged 85); Valréas, France
- Education: École nationale supérieure d'art et de design de Nancy; Haute école des arts du Rhin
- Occupations: Illustrator; Schoolteacher

Claude Lapointe (3 December 1938 – 6 October 2024) was a French illustrator, schoolteacher, and writer. He founded the illustration workshop at the École supérieure des arts décoratifs de Strasbourg.

== Life and career ==
Born in Rémilly on 3 December 1938, Lapointe attended secondary school in Metz and subsequently the École nationale supérieure d'art et de design de Nancy. From 1963 to 1965, he was a student at the École supérieure des arts décoratifs de Strasbourg. In 1967, he became a teacher at the latter school, where he founded the illustration workshop. He also taught a generation of illustrators, such as Béhé, Laurent Hirn, Jean-François Kieffer, Nadine Brass, Étienne Jung, Jérôme Jouvray, and Blutch. In 1972, his workshop exhibited a collection of his works.

In 1971, Lapointe illustrated his first book, Pierre l'ébouriffé. He collaborated with Bayard Presse, Okapi, Phosphore, and J'aime lire in the 1970s and 80s to showcase his illustrations. He also illustrated novels published by Éditions Gallimard, such as the French editions of The Adventures of Tom Sawyer and Adventures of Huckleberry Finn. He also created a collection for the publishing house, titled "Les secrets de l'image". In 1982, Lapointe won the Premio Grafico Fiera at the Bologna Children's Book Fair for the collection. In 1996, a book fair in Bordeaux organized the exhibition Mettre en scène une feuille blanche, dedicated to Lapointe's works of the 1970s. In 2016, the Association des artistes indépendants d'Alsace organized an exhibition in his honor at the Maison des Arts de Strasbourg titled Personnages en quête d'histoire.

Lapointe died in Valréas on 6 October 2024, at the age of 85.

== Works ==
- Le plus beau chien du monde (2001)

=== Grasset Jeunesse ===
- Contes de la rue Broca (2012)
- Contes de la Folie Méricourt
- Les Contes d'ailleurs et de nulle part
- Les Contes d'ailleurs et d'autre part
- Et la belette joue de la trompette
- Histoire du prince Pipo

=== Gallimard Jeunesse ===
- Du Commerce de la souris
- La Couleuvrine
- L'Appel de la forêt
- Les Aventures de Tom Sawyer
- Sa Majesté des mouches
- Grabuge et l'indomptable Amélie
- La Fameuse Invasion de la Sicile par les ours
- La Guerre des boutons
- Nic, nac, noc

=== Actes Sud Junior ===
- La gavotte du mille-pattes
- Comptines pour jouer à avoir peur
- Qui va aider Petit Pigeon ?
- Comptines pour la rentrée des classes
- Tatie la vie
- Le boa cantor
- Le civisme à petits pas
- Un point c'est tout
- Le petit mari

=== Bayard ===
- Les Deux Fils du roi des vents
- L'École des géants
- Moumouna
- Parfaite la princesse ?
- La Princesse parfaite
- Rob Rocky : l'homme des Rocheuses
- Le Talisman de Vannina
- Attention, voilà Simon !
- Une journée avec Louis XIV

=== La Martinière jeunesse ===
- Treize Contes sauvages pour monsieur Crusoé (2000)

=== Calligrames ===
- Oscar

=== Circonflexe ===
- Le monde des maisons (2007)

=== Verger éditeur ===
- Grand-Papy malgré lui
- Les états d'âme de Chipie, chienne de compagnie

=== Le Rocher (collection Lo pais d'enfance) ===
- Le Chat qui voulait vider la rivière

== Filmography ==
- Le Proverbe (2006)

== Awards ==
- Premio Grafico Fiera at the Bologna Children's Book Fair (1982)
- Honour List of the International Board on Books for Young People (1982)
- Prize of the Fondation de France (1983)
