= Ran HaCohen =

Ran HaCohen (Hebrew: רן הכהן; born 1964) is an Israeli scholar, university teacher, and translator known for his strong criticism of Israel's policies. He was born in Rotterdam, Netherlands in 1964. His mother is of Dutch Jewish descent, and his father of German Jewish descent. Having graduated from university with a B.A. in Computer Science, an M.A. in Comparative Literature and a Ph.D. in Jewish Studies, he works as a literary translator of German, English and Dutch and Ethiopic. He has also written for Antiwar.com and The Electronic Intifada.

== Awards and recognition ==
- In 2010, HaCohen was awarded the Tchernichovsky Prize for exemplary translation for his Hebrew translation of the Ethiopian national epic, Kebra Nagast.
- In 2020, HaCohen was awarded the Dutch Foundation for Literature’s Translation Prize in recognition of his excellent translations of both classic and contemporary Dutch fiction into Hebrew, and his important role as an intermediary on behalf of Dutch literature in Israel.
