= Hadoar =

Hadoar (Hebrew: The Post) (1921 - 2005) was a Hebrew language periodical published in the United States by the Histadruth Ivrith of America.

Hadoar was described by the Jewish Telegraphic Agency as "one of the best Hebrew-language magazines in the world" in its day. It was edited for decades by Hebraist Menachem Ribalow.

== History ==
Hadoar began in 1921 as a daily newspaper, but switched to weekly publication in 1922. Hadoar was published in New York and distributed nationwide. Elie Wiesel was the speaker for Hadoar's 46th anniversary celebration in 1967. Hadoar ceased publication in 2005.
