= EBRD Literature Prize =

European Bank for Reconstruction and Development Prize

- Sponsored by: European Bank for Reconstruction and Development (EBRD)
- Country: United Kingdom / Europe
- Status: Active
- First award: 2017 (established)
- Website: https://www.ebrd.com/ebrd-literature-prize.html

The EBRD Literature Prize is a literary prize established in 2017 by the European Bank for Reconstruction and Development (EBRD) in cooperation with the British Council. It was first awarded in 2018. As per the bank, the prize celebrates the "literary richness" of its regions of operation, which include more than 40 countries across Europe, Asia and Africa.

Each year, the prize is awarded for a novel or collection of short stories by a single author translated into English from a language of an economy where the EBRD currently invests. From the works submitted for consideration, ten are shortlisted, from which three are later chosen as finalists. The final winner is revealed at an awards ceremony and awarded €20,000, which is shared equally between the writer and translator. The authors and translators of the two other finalist books receive €2,000 each.

The prize is now entirely funded by the bank’s shareholders through its Community Initiative.

Entries are judged by an independent panel, composed of a chair and two or three other judges. The chair is in post for three years; the other judges are appointed yearly.

Rosie Goldsmith was chair of judges 2018–2020 and Toby Lichtig 2021–2023. Maya Jaggi is chair 2024–2026.

The inaugural winner of the EBRD Literature Prize was Istanbul Istanbul, by the Turkish writer Burhan Sönmez, translated by Ümit Hussein.

== Winners and nominees ==
= winner

Year	Title	Author	Translator	Publisher	Language	Status
2018	Istanbul Istanbul; İstanbul İstanbul	(Turkey) Burhan Sönmez	Ümit Hussein	Telegram Books	Turkish	Winner
2018	All the World's a Stage; Весь мир театр	(Russia) (Georgia (country)) Boris Akunin	Andrew Bromfield	Weidenfeld & Nicolson	Russian	Shortlist
2018	Belladonna	(Croatia) Daša Drndić	Celia Hawkesworth	MacLehose Press/Quercus	Croatian	Shortlist
2018	The Traitor's Niche; Kamarja e turpit	(Albania) Ismail Kadare	John Hodgson	Penguin Books	Albanian	Shortlist
2018	The Red-Haired Woman; Kırmızı Saçlı Kadın	(Turkey) Orhan Pamuk	Ekin Oklap	Faber & Faber	Turkish	Shortlist
2018	Maryam: Keeper of Stories مريم الحكايا	(Lebanon) Alawiya Sobh	Nirvana Tanoukhi	Seagull Books	Arabic	Shortlist
2018	In the Name of the Father; V mene otca	(Slovakia) Balla	Julia Sherwood; Peter Sherwood	Jantar Publishing	Slovak	Longlist
2018	About My Mother; Sur ma mère	(Morocco) Tahar Ben Jelloun	Ros Schwartz; Lulu Norman	Saqi/Telegram	French	Longlist
2018	The Equestrienne; Krasojazdkyňa	(Slovakia) Uršuľa Kovalyk	Julia Sherwood; Peter Sherwood	Parthian Books	Slovak	Longlist
2018	The Bickford Fuse; Бикфордов мир	(Ukraine) Andrey Kurkov	Boris Dralyuk	MacLehose Press/Quercus	Russian	Longlist
2018	Women Who Blow on Knots; Düğümlere Üfleyen Kadınlar	(Turkey) Ece Temelkuran	Alexander Dawe	Parthian Books	Turkish	Longlist
2018	Hair Everywhere; Kosa posvuda	(Croatia) Tea Tulić	Coral Petkovich	Istros Books	Croatian	Longlist
2019	The Devils' Dance; Jinlar bazmi, yoxud Katta oʻyin	(Uzbekistan) Hamid Ismailov	Donald Rayfield; John Farndon	Tilted Axis	Uzbek	Winner
2019	Soviet Milk; Mātes piens	(Latvia) Nora Ikstena	Margita Gailītis	Peirene Press	Latvian	Shortlist
2019	Drive Your Plow Over the Bones of the Dead; Prowadź swój pług przez kości umarłych	(Poland) Olga Tokarczuk	Antonia Lloyd-Jones	Fitzcarraldo Editions	Polish	Shortlist
2019	Lala	(Poland) Jacek Dehnel	Antonia Lloyd-Jones	Oneworld Publications	Polish	Longlist
2019	My Name Is Adam اسمي آدم	(Lebanon) Elias Khoury	Humphrey Davies	MacLehose Press	Arabic	Longlist
2019	The Clash of Images; La querelle des images	(Morocco) Abdelfattah Kilito	Robyn Cresswell	Darf Publishers	French	Longlist
2019	The Peace Machine; Barış Makinesi	(Turkey) Özgür Mumcu	Mark David Wyers	Pushkin Press	Turkish	Longlist
2019	The Aviator; Авиатор	(Russia) (Ukraine) Eugene Vodolazkin	Lisa C. Hayden	Oneworld	Russian	Longlist
2019	The Book of Whispers; Cartea șoaptelor	(Romania) (Armenia) Varujan Vosganian	Alastair Ian Blyth	Yale University	Romanian	Longlist
2019	Shatila Stories	Various	Nashwa Gowanlock	Peirene Press	Arabic	Longlist
2020	Devilspel; Очарованье сатаны	(Lithuania) (Israel) Grigory Kanovich	Yisrael Elliot Cohen	Noir Press	Russian	Winner
2020	Pixel	(Turkey) Krisztina Tóth	Owen Good	Seagull Books	Hungarian	Shortlist
2020	Zuleikha; Зулейха открывает глаза	(Russia) Guzel Yakhina	Lisa C. Hayden	Oneworld	Russian	Shortlist
2020	Not Saying Goodbye; Не прощаюсь	(Russia) (Georgia (country)) Boris Akunin	Andrew Bromfield	Orion	Russian	Longlist
2020	Sacred Darkness წმინდა წყვდიადი	(Georgia (country)) Levan Berdzenishvili	Brian James Baer; Ellen Vayner	Europa Editions	Georgian (translated from Russian)	Longlist
2020	Mrs Mohr Goes Missing; Tajemnica domu Helclów	(Poland) Jacek Dehnel	Antonia Lloyd-Jones	Oneworld	Polish	Longlist
2020	Bellevue	(Slovakia) Ivana Dobrakovová	Julia Sherwood; Peter Sherwood	Jantar Publishing	Slovak	Longlist
2020	Ice الجليد	(Egypt) Sonallah Ibrahim	Margaret Litvin	Seagull Books	Arabic	Longlist
2020	Every Fire You Tend; Yüzünde Bir Yer	(Turkey) Sema Kaygusuz	Nicholas Glastonbury	Tilted Axis	Turkish	Longlist
2020	Under Pressure; Pod pritiskom	(Bosnia and Herzegovina) Faruk Šehić	Mirza Purić	Istros Books	Bosnian	Longlist
2021	The King of Warsaw; Król	(Poland) Szczepan Twardoch	Sean Gasper Bye	Amazon Crossing	Polish	Winner
2021	The Pear Field მსხლების მინდორი	(Georgia (country)) Nana Ekvtimishvili	Elizabeth Heighway	Peirene Press	Georgian	Shortlist
2021	Mr K Released; Domnul K. eliberat	(Romania) (France) Matei Vișniec	Jozefina Komporaly	Seagull Books	Romanian	Shortlist
2021	Love in the Days of Rebellion; İsyan Günlerinde Aşk	(Turkey) Ahmet Altan	Brendan Freely; Yelda Türedi	Europa Editions	Turkish	Longlist
2021	Grey Bees; Серые пчёлы	(Ukraine) Andrey Kurkov	Boris Dralyuk	MacLehose/Quercus	Russian	Longlist
2021	Carbide; Карбід	(Ukraine) Andriy Lyubka	Reilly Costigan-Humes; Isaac Stockhouse Wheeler	Jantar Publishing	Ukrainian	Longlist
2021	Hana	(Czech Republic) Alena Mornštajnová	Julia Sherwood and Peter Sherwood	Parthian Books	Czech	Longlist
2021	No-Signal Area; Područje bez signala	(Croatia) Robert Perišić	Ellen Elias-Bursać	Seven Stories	Croatian	Longlist
2021	The Highly Unreliable Account of the History of a Madhouse; Bir Deliler Evinin Yalan Yanlış Anlatılan Kısa Tarihi	(Turkey) Ayfer Tunç	Feyza Howell	Istros Books	Turkish	Longlist
2021	Your Ad Could Go Here; Тут могла б бути ваша реклама	(Ukraine) Oksana Zabuzhko	Nina Murray; Marta Horban; Marco Carynnyk; Halyna Hryn; Askold Melnyczuk	Amazon Crossing	Ukrainian	Longlist
2022	The Orphanage; Інтернат	(Ukraine) Serhiy Zhadan	Reilly Costigan-Humes; Isaac Stackhouse Wheeler	Yale University	Ukrainian	Winner
2022	The Book of Katerina; Το βιβλίο της Κατερίνας	(Greece) Auguste Corteau	Claire Papamichail	Parthian Books	Greek	Shortlist
2022	Boat Number Five; Piata loď	(Slovakia) Monika Kompaníková	Janet Livingstone	Seagull Books	Slovak	Shortlist
2022	Doctor Bianco and Other Stories; Doktor Bianko i inne opowiadania	(Poland) Maciek Bielawski	Scotia Gilroy	Terra Librorum	Polish	Longlist
2022	Birds of Verhovina; Verhovina madarai	(Hungary) Ádám Bodor	Peter Sherwood	Jantar Publishing	Hungarian	Longlist
2022	Red Crosses; Красный крест	(Belarus) Sasha Filipenko	Brian James Baer; Ellen Vayner	Europa Editions	Russian	Longlist
2022	City of Torment; Trýznivé město	(Czech Republic) Daniela Hodrová	Veronique Firkusny; Elena Sokol	Jantar Publishing	Czech	Longlist
2022	Manaschi	(Uzbekistan) Hamid Ismailov	Donald Rayfield	Tilted Axis Press	Uzbek	Longlist
2022	Karolina, or the Torn Curtain; Rozdarta zasłona	(Poland) Maryla Szymiczkowa	Antonia Lloyd-Jones	Oneworld	Polish	Longlist
2022	Just the Plague; Чума	(Russia) Ludmila Ulitskaya	Polly Gannon	Granta	Russian	Longlist
2023	The Lake; Jezero	(Czech Republic) Bianca Bellová	Alex Zucker	Parthian Books	Czech	Winner
2023	Mister N مستر نون	(Lebanon) Najwa Barakat	Luke Leafgren	And Other Stories	Arabic	Finalists
2023	The Books of Jacob; Księgi Jakubowe	(Poland) Olga Tokarczuk	Jennifer Croft	Fitzcarraldo Editions	Polish	Finalists
2023	Mothers and Truckers; Matky a kamionisti	(Slovakia) Ivana Dobrakovová	Julia Sherwood; Peter Sherwood	Jantar Publishing	Slovak	Shortlist
2023	Invisible Woman and Other Stories; Nevidljiva žena i druge priče	(Croatia) Slavenka Drakulić	Christina Pribichevich Zorić; Jacob Agee	Fraktura	Croatian	Shortlist
2023	Time Shelter; Времеубежище	(Bulgaria) Georgi Gospodinov	Angela Rodel	Weidenfeld & Nicolson	Bulgarian	Shortlist
2023	According to Her; Według niej	(Poland) Maciej Hen	Anna Blasiak	Holland House Books	Polish	Shortlist
2023	Body Kintsugi; Kintsugi tijela	(Bosnia and Herzegovina) Senka Marić	Celia Hawkesworth	Peirene Press	Bosnian	Shortlist
2023	Nights of Plague; Veba Geceleri	(Turkey) Orhan Pamuk	Ekin Oklap	Faber & Faber	Turkish	Shortlist
2023	Mondegreen: Songs about Death and Love; Мондеґрін: Пісні про смерть і любов	(Ukraine) Volodymyr Rafeienko	Mark Andryczyk	HURI Books	Ukrainian	Shortlist
2024	The End; A vége	(Hungary) (Romania) Attila Bartis	Judith Sollosy	Archipelago	Hungarian	Winner
2024	The Wounded Age and Eastern Tales; Yaralı Zaman & Doğu Öyküleri	(Turkey) Ferit Edgü	Aron Aji	New York Review	Turkish	Finalists
2024	Barcode; Vonalkód	(Hungary) Krisztina Tóth	Peter Sherwood	Jantar Publishing	Hungarian	Finalists
2024	Niki; Νίκη	(Greece) Christos Chomenidis	Patricia Felisa Barbeito	Other Press	Greek	Shortlist
2024	Jimi Hendrix Live in Lviv; Львовская гастроль Джими Хендрикса	(Ukraine) Andrey Kurkov	Reuben Woolley	MacLehose Press	Russian	Shortlist
2024	Exiled Shadow; Umbra exilată	(Romania) Norman Manea	Carla Baricz	Yale University	Romanian	Shortlist
2024	History of Ash سيرة الرماد	(Morocco) Khadija Marouazi	Alexander E. Elinson	Hoopoe	Arabic	Shortlist
2024	Let's Go Home, Son; Sine, idemo kući	(Croatia) Ivica Prtenjača	David Williams	Istros Books	Croatian	Shortlist
2024	This Thing Called Love اسمه الغرام	(Lebanon) Alawiya Sobh	Max Weiss	Seagull Books	Arabic	Shortlist
2024	A Sensitive Person; Citlivý člověk	(Czech Republic) Jáchym Topol	Alex Zucker	Yale University	Czech	Shortlist
2025	Sons, Daughters; Sinovi, kćeri	(Croatia) Ivana Bodrožić	Ellen Elias-Bursać	Seven Stories	Croatian	Winner
2025	Forgottenness; Забуття	(Ukraine) (Austria) Tanya Malyarchuk	Zenia Tompkins	Bullaun Press (Ireland); Liveright (US)	Ukrainian	Finalists
2025	The Empusium: A Health Resort Horror Story; Empuzjon: Horror przyrodoleczniczy	(Poland) Olga Tokarczuk	Antonia Lloyd-Jones	Fitzcarraldo Editions	Polish	Finalists
2025	The Ukraine	(Ukraine) Artem Chapeye	Zenia Tompkins	Seven Stories	Ukrainian	Shortlist
2025	Too Great a Sky; Capătul drumului	(Moldova) (Romania) Liliana Corobca	Monica Cure	Seven Stories	Romanian	Shortlist
2025	Engagement; Nişan Evi	(Turkey) (Netherlands) Çiler İlhan	Kenneth Dakan	Istros Books	Turkish	Shortlist
2025	My Women; Мої жінки	(Ukraine) Yuliia Iliukha	Hanna Leliv	128 LIT	Ukrainian	Shortlist
2025	Celebration; Proslava	(Croatia) Damir Karakaš	Ellen Elias-Bursać	Selkies House	Croatian	Shortlist
2025	Herscht 07769	(Hungary) László Krasznahorkai	Ottilie Mulzet	New Directions	Hungarian	Shortlist
2025	Life After Kafka; Život po Kafkovi	(Czech Republic) Magdaléna Platzová	Alex Zucker	Bellevue	Czech	Shortlist
2026	People and Trees; Adamlar və ağaclar	(Azerbaijan) Akram Aylisli	Katherine E. Young	Plamen Press	Azerbaijani (translated from Russian)	Winner
2026	Ice; Lód	(Poland) Jacek Dukaj	Ursula Phillips	Head of Zeus	Polish	Finalists
2026	On the Greenwich Line على خط جرينتش	(Egypt) Shady Lewis	Katharine Halls	Peirene Press	Arabic	Finalists
2026	Sololand قانون سولولاند	(Iraq) (Finland) Hassan Blasim	Jonathan Wright	Comma Press	Arabic	Shortlist
2026	In Late Summer; U kasno ljeto	(Croatia) Magdalena Blažević	Anđelka Raguž	Linden Editions	Croatian	Shortlist
2026	Rock, Paper, Grenade; Хто ти такий?	(Ukraine) Artem Chekh	Olena Jennings; Oksana Rosenblum	Seven Stories	Ukrainian	Shortlist
2026	Death and the Gardener; Градинарят и смъртта	(Bulgaria) Georgi Gospodinov	Angela Rodel	Weidenfeld & Nicolson	Bulgarian	Shortlist
2026	We Computers: A Ghazal Novel; Bizkim komputerlar, yo dunyoning eng goʻzal shoiri?	(Uzbekistan) Hamid Ismailov	Shelley Fairweather-Vega	Yale University	Uzbek	Shortlist
2026	Eye of the Monkey; A majom szeme	(Hungary) Krisztina Tóth	Ottilie Mulzet	Seven Stories	Hungarian	Shortlist
2026	Bedbugs; Stjenice	(Croatia) Martina Vidaić	Ellen Elias-Bursać	Sandorf Passage	Croatian	Shortlist
