= Ümit Hussein =

British literary translator and interpreter

Ümit Hussein is a British literary translator and interpreter based in Seville, Spain. She has translated many books from Turkish to English, including the works of such authors as Ahmet Altan, Yavuz Ekinci, Sine Ergün, Nevin Halıcı, Burhan Sönmez, Nermin Yıldırım, and Mehmet Yaşın.

Hussein's translations have been significant in "putting Turkish literature on the map" by making it accessible to non-Turkish speakers, as well as to the second and third-generation Turks and Cypriots in the United Kingdom.

== Early life and career ==
Hussein was born in Bethnal Green and raised in Tottenham, London. Her parents are both Turkish Cypriot, consequently, Hussein grew up bilingual speaking both Turkish and English. She later also learned French, Italian, and Spanish. Hussein studied Italian and European Literature and graduated with an MA in Literary Translation from the University of East Anglia. Her first book translation was an experimental novel by Mehmet Yaşın called Soydaşınız Balık Burcu.

== Awards ==
In 2018, her translation of Burhan Sönmez’s Istanbul Istanbul won the inaugural EBRD Literature Prize.

== Personal life ==
She currently resides in Seville, Spain.
