= Weronika Murek =

Polish playwright

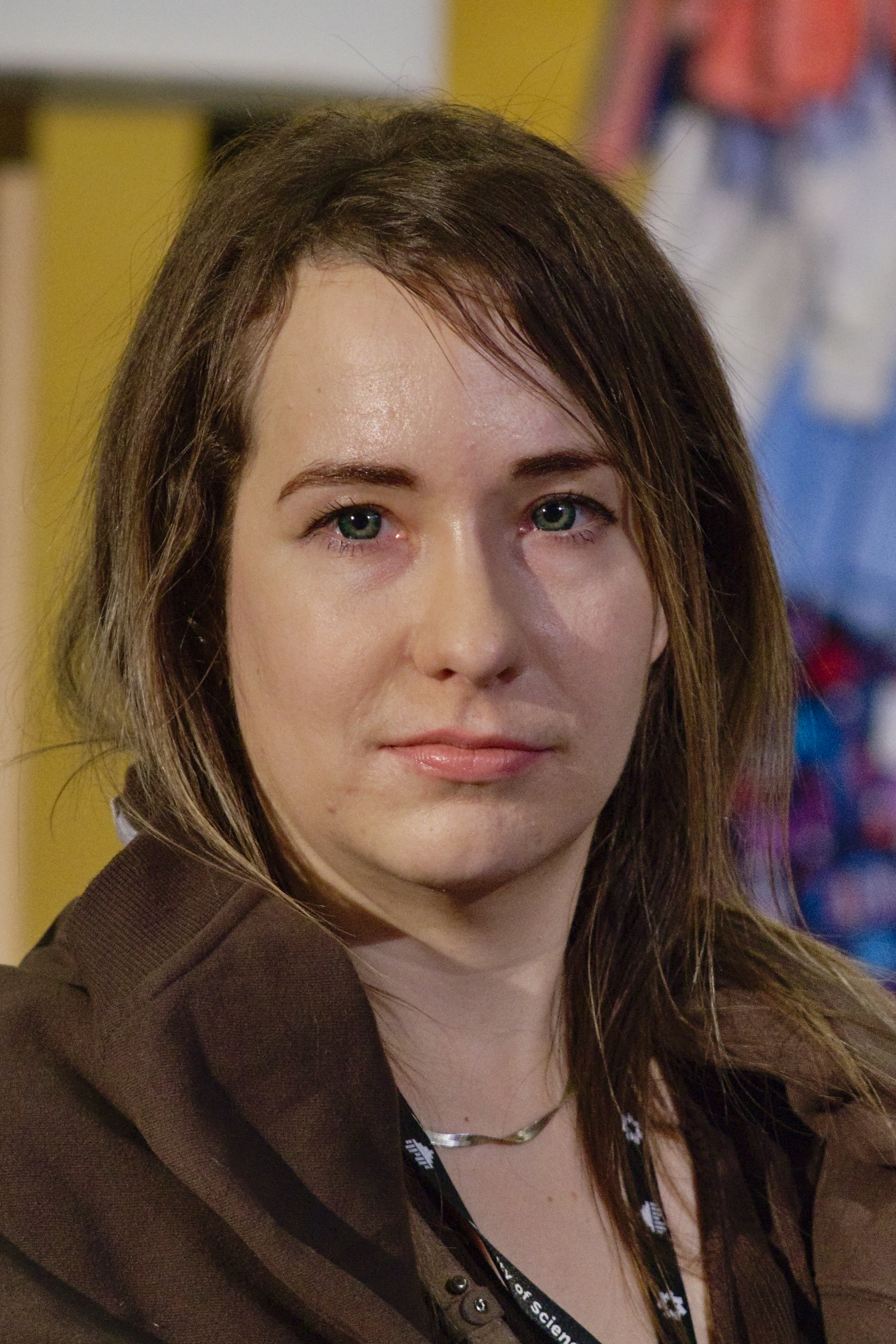
- Born: 1989 (age 35–36) Bytom, Poland
- Occupation: writer

Weronika Murek (born 1989) is a Polish playwright, short story writer and essayist.

== Early life and education ==
Weronika Murek was born in 1989, in Bytom. She graduated from the Faculty of Law and Administration of the University of Silesia.

== Career ==
Murek has written plays, short stories and essays. She won the Gdynia Drama Award 2015 for the play Feinweinblein set in the 1950s Upper Silesia. Her debut collection of short stories Uprawa roślin południowych metodą Miczurina was nominated for the Paszport Polityki 2015 in the literature category, the Nike Award 2016, the Gdynia Literary Prize 2016 and the Conrad Award 2016. The collection won the Witold Gombrowicz literary award in 2016. Murek gained her second Paszport Polityki nomination with the 2019 collection of plays called Feinweinblein.

Apart from writing her own plays, Murek has also worked on adaptating the work of others to the stage. For example, she cooperated with Grzegorz Jarzyna to adapt a work by Lu Xun or create together a new production of The Tempest.

Murek's works have been translated into Czech, French, Serbian and Hungarian. An excerpt from her short story collection was published in English on the European Literature Network website.

== Works ==
- Uprawa roślin południowych metodą Miczurina, 2015
- Każdemu po razie, short story for O_KA literary project, 2016
- Feinweinblein, 2019
- Dziewczynki: kilka esejów o stawaniu się, 2023
- Urodziny, novel, 2025
