= Sait Faik Short Story Award =

The Sait Faik Short Story Award is a prize given annually by the Sait Faik Museum to the best collection of short stories in Turkish. The award has been given annually since 1955 and was started by the mother of Sait Faik Abasıyanık.

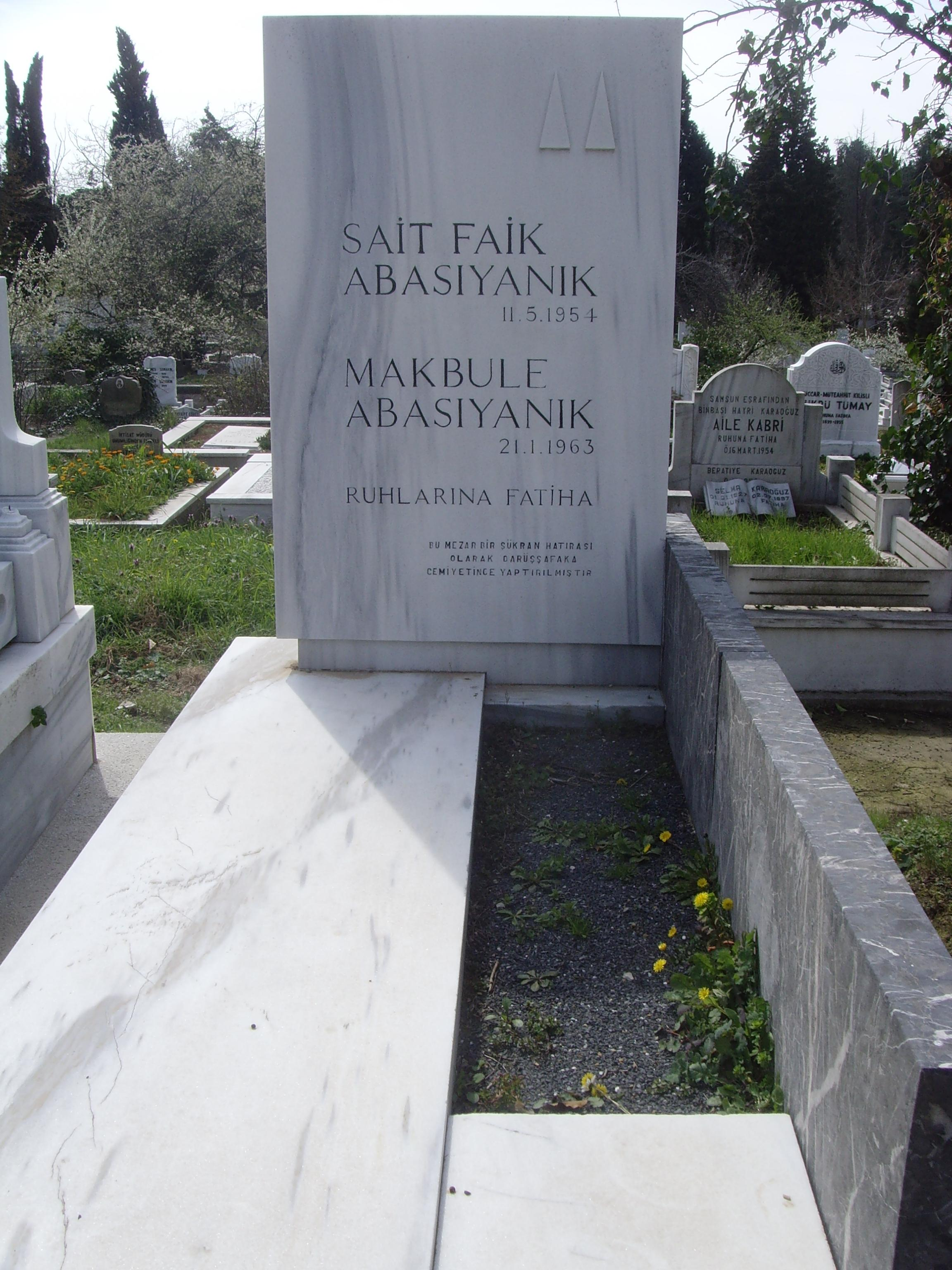
Grave of Sait Faik Abasıyanık and his mother Makbule

== Selected winners of the Sait Faik Short Story Prize ==
Annual winners
| year | name | Title | Translated title |
|---|---|---|---|
| 1955 | Sabahattin Kudret Aksal | Gazoz Ağacı | Soda pop tree |
| | Faik Baysal | Haldun Taner | One Minute to Twelve |
| 1958 | Orhan Kemal | Kardeş Payı | Fair Share |
| 1964 | Mehmet Seyda | Başgöz Etme Zamanı | Time for Marriage |
| 1965 | Kâmuran Şipal | Elbiseciler Çarşısı | Dressmaker's Market |
| | Mahmut Özay | Yorgo | Giorgio |
| 1966 | Cengiz Yörük | Çölde Bir Deve | A Camel in the Desert |
| 1968 | Muzaffer Buyrukçu | Kavga | The Fight |
| 1969 | Orhan Kemal | Önce Ekmek | Before Bread |
| | | Sancı Meydanı | Arena of Anguish |
| 1971 | Bilge Karasu | Uzun Sürmüş Bir Günün Akşamı | A Long Day's Evening |
| 1972 | Füruzan | Parasız Yatılı | Free Boarding School |
| | Bekir Yıldız | Kaçakçı Şahan | Sahan the Smuggler |
| 1973 | Demirtaş Ceyhun | Çamasan | The Laundry |
| 1974 | Fakir Baykurt | Can Parası | Life Money |
| 1975 | Adalet Ağaoğlu | Yüksek Gerilim | High Tension |
| 1976 | Selim İleri | Dostlukların son Günü | Last Day of Friendships |
| 1977 | Necati Cumalı | Makedonya 1900 | Macedonia 1900 |
| 1978 | Adnan Özyalçıner | Gözleri Bağlı Adam | The Blindfolded Man |
| | Selçuk Baran | Anaların Hakkı | Mothers' Rights |
| 1979 | Ferit Edgü | Bir Gemide | On a Ship |
| 1980 | Tomris Uyar | Yürekte Bukağı | Patterns of the Heart |
| 1984 | Pınar Kür | Akışı Olmayan Sular | Dry Stream* |
| 1985 | Feyza Hepçilingirler | Eski Bir Balerin | The Old Ballerina |
| 1987 | Tomris Uyar | Yaza Yolculuk | Summer Voyage |
| 1988 | Mahir Öztaş | Ay Gözetleme Komitesi | Committee of Lunar Observation |
| 1988 | Gülderen Bilgili | Bir Gece Yolculuğu | A Night Journey |
| 1989 | Demir Özlü | Stockholm Öyküleri | Stockholm Stories |
| 1990 | Nezihe Meriç | Bir Kara Derin Kuyu | A Dark Deep Well |
| | Osman Şahin | Selam Ateşleri | Greeting Fires |
| 1994 | Mehmet Zaman Saçlıoğlu | Yaz Evi | The Summer House |
| 1996 | Cemil Kavukçu | Uzak Noktalara Doğru | Destinations of the Far Right |
| 1997 | Ayşe Kulin | Foto Sabah Resimleri | Morning Images |
| 1998 | Orhan Duru | Fırtına | The Storm |
| 1998 | Erdal Öz | Sular Ne Güzelse | |
| 2000 | Faruk Duman | Av Dönüşleri | Return of the Hunt |
| 2001 | Murat Gülsoy | Bu Kitabı Çalın | This Book of Plays |
| 2002 | Yekta Kopan | Aşk Mutfağından Yalnızlık Tarifleri | Recipes of Love and Solitude |
| 2004 | Başar Başarır | Getirin O Günleri Yakalım Bu Öyküleri | Bring back those days and we'll burn this stories |
| 2008 | Behçet Çelik | Gün Ortasında Arzu | Noon Desires |
| 2009 | Feryal Tilmaç | Aradım Yaz Dediniz | |
| 2010 | Aslı Erdoğan | Taş Bina ve Diğerleri | The Stone Building and the Others |
| 2011 | Ahmet Büke | Kumrunun Gördüğü | I Saw Turtledoves |
| 2012 | Yalçın Tosun | Peruk Gibi Hüzünlü | Such a Sad Wig |
| 2013 | Sine Ergün | Bazen Hayat | Sometimes Life Is |
| 2014 | Mahir Ünsal Eriş | Olduğu Kadar Güzeldik | As Beautiful as Us |
