= Şipal =

Şipal is a Turkish surname. Notable people with the surname include:

- Kâmuran Şipal (1926–2019), Turkish novelist, story writer and translator
- Önder Şipal (born 1987), Turkish boxer
- Onur Şipal (born 1989), Turkish boxer, brother of Önder
