= Marouazi =

Marouazi is a surname. Notable people with the surname include:

- Khadija Marouazi (born 1961), Moroccan human rights activist, writer, and university lecturer
- Mohammed Marouazi (born 1973), Moroccan actor
