= Letters to Felice =

Book by Franz Kafka

- 1973 English edition of Letters to Felice
- Author: Franz Kafka
- Original title: Briefe an Felice
- Translator: James Stern and Elisabeth Duckworth
- Language: German
- Genre: Letters
- Publisher: Schocken Books
- Publication date: 1967
- Publication place: United States
- English publication date: 1973
- Media type: Print, Hardcover
- ISBN: 0-8052-3500-0

Letters to Felice is a book collecting some of the letters Czech author Franz Kafka wrote to his fiancée Felice Bauer from 1912 to 1917. Schocken Books acquired these letters from Felice Bauer in 1955, in addition to roughly half of Kafka's letters to Grete Bloch, Bauer's friend. Additional letters to Bloch were acquired at a later date. During the period of the correspondence Kafka and Bauer were engaged twice, and Kafka produced some of his most famous works, including The Metamorphosis, "In the Penal Colony", and his first attempts at writing The Trial.

Originally published in German in 1967 as Briefe an Felice, the collection was first published in English by Schocken Books in 1973. It was translated by James Stern and Elisabeth Duckworth.

Bulgarian novelist Elias Canetti wrote about the correspondence in Kafka's Other Trial: The Letters to Felice. Through a reading of the letters along with sections of The Trial Canetti examined Kafka's struggle between a comfortable middle-class life and individual isolation.

== Legacy and cultural references ==
In 1992, the English rock band The Cure released a song called "A Letter to Elise" on their 1992 album Wish, and later as a single. The song is inspired by Kafka's letters to Felice.
