= Sara Curry =

Sara Curry (1863 – March 11, 1940) was a late 19th/early 20th century teacher in the US known for founding The Little Missionary's Day Nursery.

The school, founded in Manhattan's Lower East Side in 1896, provided immigrant families of the day with a day-care option to allow both parents to seek employment and thus bolstered the economy of the region. In recognition of her efforts, local residents came to call Curry "The Little Missionary", and the school was formally renamed as The Little Missionary's Day Nursery on her retirement. The school remains open to the present day, the oldest continuously operated non-denominational pre-school in New York City. The nursery was renamed Little Missionary's Day Nursery/Sara Curry Preschool in 2005 to avoid the image of a sectarian or religious school and to invoke the name of the founder. The school has always been non-sectarian and catered to working families from all over the world.

Curry was born in Brookhaven, New York' and was orphaned around age ten. She moved to Utica with two of her siblings and worked in a cap factory. She moved to New York City in her twenties and was saddened by the plight of young children of who were left to wander in the streets in Manhattan's Lower East Side or were tied to balconies while their parents worked in factories. She began her work by taking in children to her apartment on Avenue C around 1896.

By 1901, she had gained support from generous donors and was able to secure the building at 93 St. Marks Place. Curry was able to take care of 200 children a day at the nursery, and the work included feeding and educating them, as well as providing cooking classes for parents, and holding regular sobriety meetings. She made friends with influential people who helped fund the nursery, including Frederick Cooper Hewitt, Louis Rolston, Alexander Morgan, and Mrs. John D. Rockefeller. After her death in 1940, the nursery declined, and at one point the building was on the brink of being sold. Since 2001, the nursery has been on a path of consistent growth, and on October 5, 2013, St. Marks Place between Avenue A and First Avenue was co-named Sara Curry Way.

The Sara Curry Humanitarian Award has been presented annually since 2004. This award is given to individuals who exemplify the qualities of Sara Curry: - A vision of a better future for others - Dedication to the well being of the community - Selfless commitment to giving - Energy and passion to overcome obstacles

Recipients of the award include Gloria Steinem, Jennifer Clement, Michael Rosen, Lily Tomlin, Senator Thomas K Duane, Natasha Weiss, Anne Weisberg, Dr. David Ores, Margarita López, Dan Zanes, Nilaja Sun, Dr. Michel Cohen, Mary Spink, Michael Rosen and Vallejo Gantner.
