= Alena Mornštajnová =

Czech writer and translator

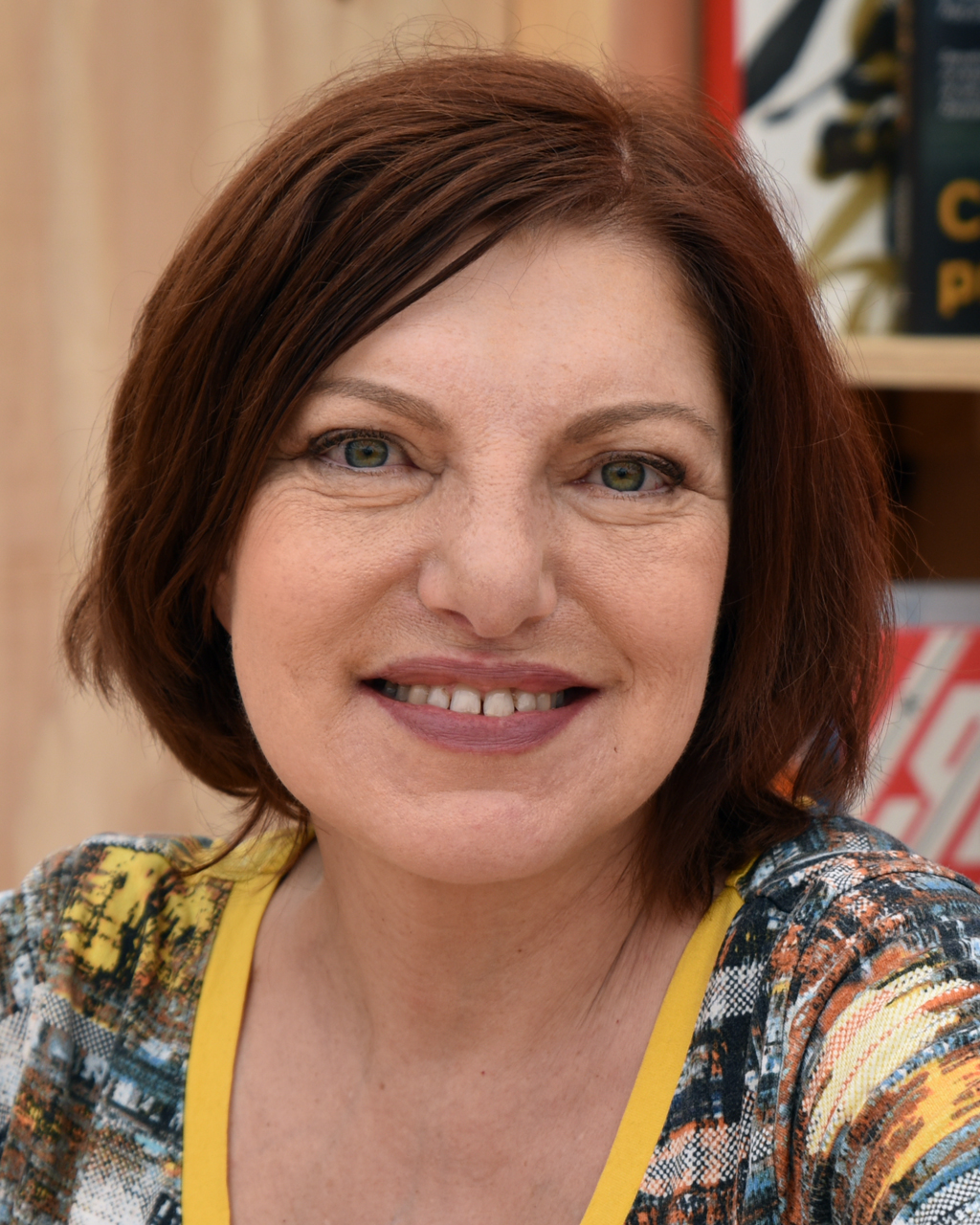
Alena Mornštajnová in 2022

Alena Mornštajnová (born 24 June 1963 in Valašské Meziříčí) is a Czech writer and translator.

== Life and career ==
She attended Ostrava University, where she studied English and Czech. She has published a series of acclaimed novels, starting with her debut novel Slepá mapa (Blind Map, 2013) which was nominated for the 2014 Czech Book Prize. Subsequent works include Hotýlek (The Little Hotel, 2015), Hana (2017), and Tiché roky (Years of Silence, 2019). Hana is her most successful work to date and has been translated into English and several other languages. It was nominated for the 2021 EBRD Book Prize. She has also written a book for children, Strašidýlko stráša (Stráša the Little Ghost).

Mornštajnová lives in Valašské Meziříčí.

== Novels ==
- Hana, Translated from the Czech by Julia and Peter Sherwood, Parthian 2020. ISBN 978-83-65989-06-2.
- Mornštajnová, Alena; Wróbel, Agata (2020). Pusta mapa. Wrocław: Wydawnictwo Amaltea. ISBN 978-83-65989-12-3.
- Mornštajnová, Alena; Radwan-Żbikowska, Anna; Grabiński, Tomasz (2022). Lata ciszy. Wrocław: Wydawnictwo Amaltea. ISBN 978-83-65989-15-4.
