= Shady Lewis =

Egyptian novelist and journalist

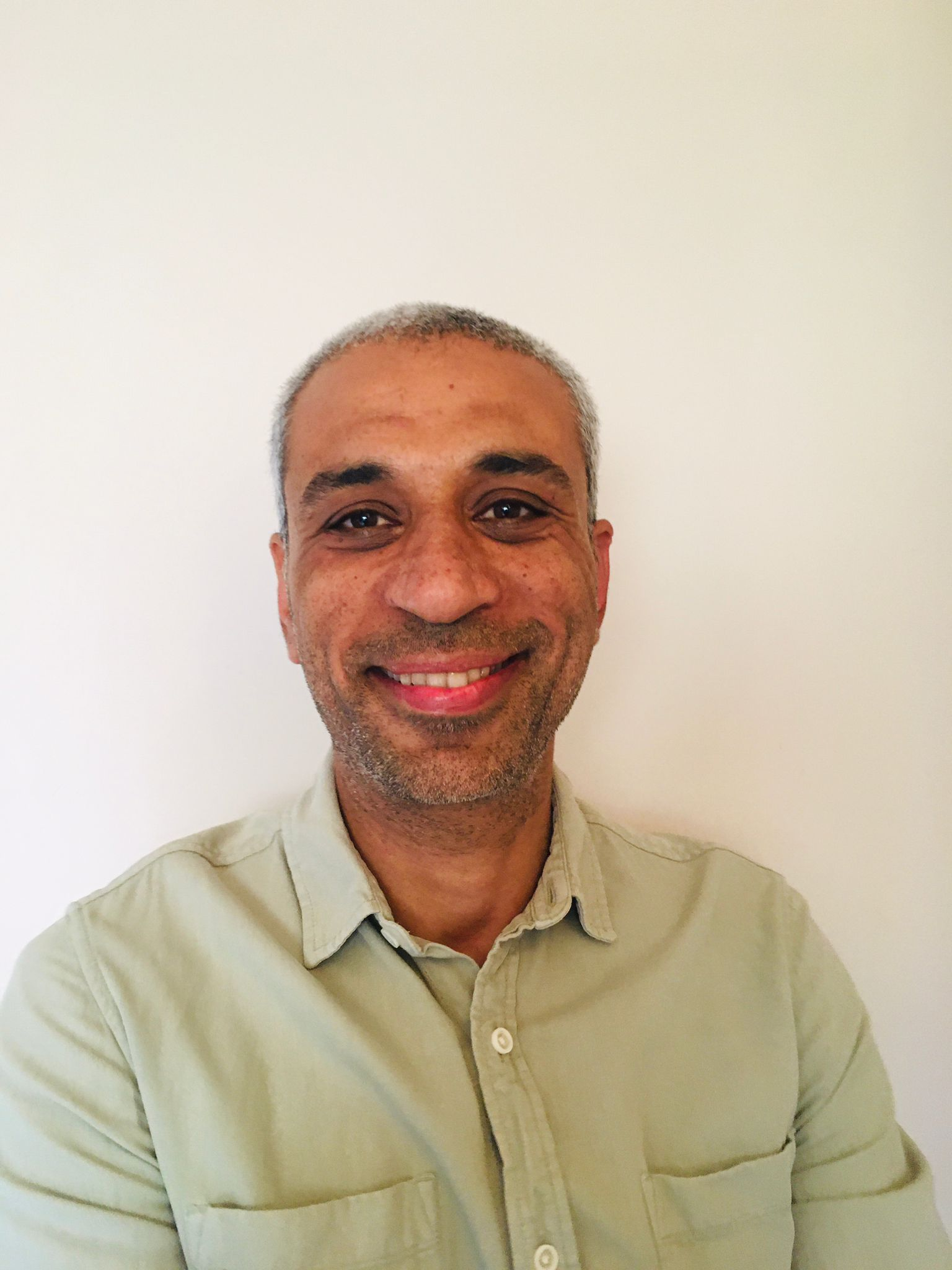
- Native name: شادي لويس
- Born: Shady Lewis Boutros; 1978 Cairo, Egypt
- Language: Arabic
- Period: 2018–present

Shady Lewis Boutros (Arabic: شادي لويس بطرس; born 1978) is an Egyptian novelist and journalist. He has written three novels, including On the Greenwich Line, published in Arabic in 2020. The English translation, by Katherine Halls, was published in 2025, and was shortlisted for the EBRD Literature Prize and the Banipal Prize for Arabic Literary Translation. It won the James Tait Black Memorial Prize in 2026.

== Life ==
Lewis was born in Cairo in 1978. He is of Coptic Christian origin. He has lived in London since 2006.

== Career ==
Lewis's first novel, Ways of the Lord (Turuq Al Rab, 2018), focused on a Christian man living in Egypt.

His second novel, On the Greenwich Line (Ala Khat Greenwich), was published in 2020. The English translation by Katharine Halls was published by Peirene Press. It won the James Tait Black Prize for fiction in 2026. It is only the third book in translation to win this award. It was also longlisted for the Queen Mary Small Press Fiction Prize and shortlisted for the EBRD Literature Prize. Katherine Halls was shortlisted for the Banipal Prize for Arabic Literary Translation for her English translation of the novel. The French translation by Sophie Pommier and May Rostom was nominated for the 2023 Prix de la littérature arabe.

His third novel, A Brief History of Creation and East Cairo (Tarikh Mugaz Lilkhaliqah wa Sharq Al Qahira), was published in 2021. The French translation by Sophie Pommier and May Rostom was shortlisted for the Prix de la littérature arabe 2025.

Lewis has also published a travel diary.
