= Alawiya Sobh =

Lebanese writer and author (born 1955)

- Born: Alawiya Sobh; 1955 (age 70–71); Beirut, Lebanon
- Education: English & Arabic Literature
- Alma mater: Lebanese University
- Occupations: Writer and novelist

Alawiya Sobh (Arabic: علوية صبح; born 1955) is a Lebanese writer and author.

== Biography ==
Born in Beirut, Sobh studied English & Arabic Literature at the Lebanese University. Upon graduation in 1978, she pursued a career in teaching. She also began publishing articles and short stories, at first in An-Nida newspaper and then in An-Nahar. After a spell as cultural editor, she became editor-in-chief of Al-Hasnaa, a popular Arabic women's magazine, in 1986. In the early 1990s, she became editor-in-chief of women's magazine Snob Al-Hasnaa’. In 2009, Sobh served on the judging panel of the Beirut39 competition.

Sobh is now dedicating her time only to writing.

== Works ==
Short Stories

- Slumber of Days (1986)

Novels (All novels were published originally at Dar Al Adab in their native Arabic language)

- 2002 - Maryam Al-Hakaya (Maryam: Keeper of the Stories)
- 2006 - Dunya (Life)
- 2009 - Ismuhu Al-Gharam (It's Called Passion)
- 2020 - An Taashak Al-Hayat (To Love Life)

Translations

- Maryam Al-Hayaka was translated into English by Seagull Books, into French by Gallimard and into German by Suhrkamp.
- Dunya was translated into Italian by Mondadori.
- Ismuhu Al-Gharam was translated into Italian by Mondadori and into Romanian by Polirom.

== Reception of work ==
Sobh's work has been critically acclaimed and is the subject of numerous doctoral works and literary studies. For her literary accomplishments and innovative writing, Sobh received the Sultan Qaboos prize in Oman in 2007. Her novels Dunya and Ismuhu Al-Gharam were long-listed for the Arabic Booker Prize in 2008 and 2010, respectively. In 2016, an eponymous award dubbed the "Alawiya Sobh Literary critique Award" was launched at Abdelmalek Essaâdi University in Tétouan for participants whose critiques center around Sobh's work. Maryam: Keeper of Stories was short-listed in 2019 for the EBRD Literature Prize. Sobh's cumulative work then proceeded to earn her the Al Owais Award in 2019 for the category of "Stories: Novels and Drama". Most recently in 2021, An Taashak Al-Hayat made the three-book short-list in Sheikh Zayed Book Award's Literature section.
