= Peter Sherwood =

British Professor of Linguistics (born 1948)

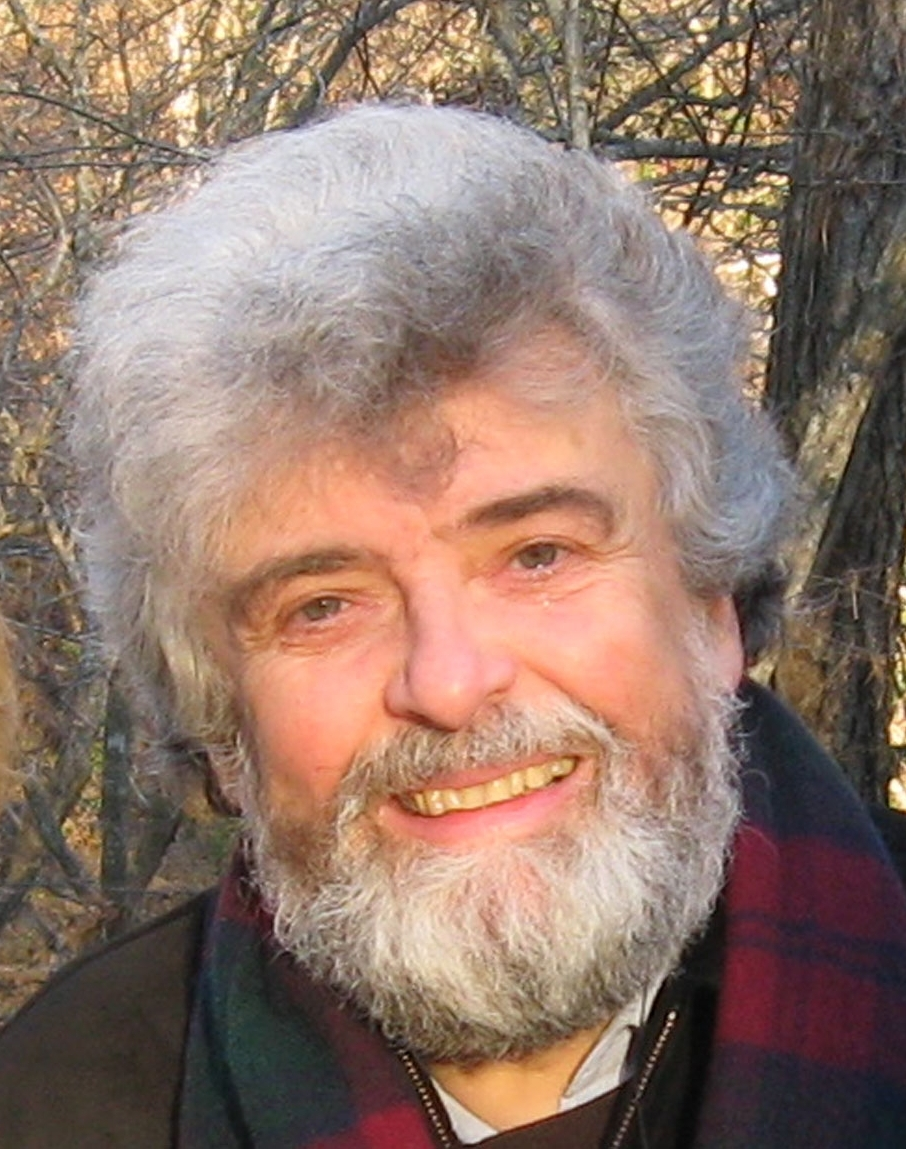
- Born: 30 September 1948; Budapest, Hungary
- Education: University of London
- Website: Julia and Peter Sherwood

Peter Andrew Sherwood (born 30 September 1948, Budapest) is a British Professor of Linguistics, who was born in Hungary, and left the country with his family after 1956. He is a writer, editor, translator and lexicographer and as the Laszlo Birinyi Sr., Distinguished Professor in Hungarian Language and Culture at the University of North Carolina at Chapel Hill.

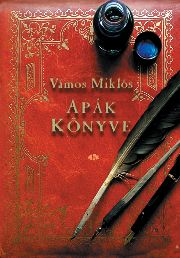
The Book of Fathers by Miklós Vámos, translated by Peter Sherwood and illustrated by Jozsef Szurcsik

== Personal life ==
Peter Sherwood is married, his wife is Julia Sherwood, née Kalinová, they have one daughter.

== Career ==
=== Education ===
- Manchester Grammar School, England, (1960–1966)
- University of London, 1970., (BA),
- University of London, 1976., (Diploma in Linguistics)

=== Professional experience ===
- 2008-2014 Laszlo Birinyi Sr. Distinguished professor of Hungarian language and culture university of North Carolina at Chapel Hill.
- 1972–2007 Lecturer (later: senior lecturer) In Hungarian, school of Slavonic and east European studies, University of London,

(later: University College London)

=== Visiting lectureship ===
- United Kingdom, University of Cambridge: visiting lecturer, 1999,
- Outside United Kingdom:
1. University of Szeged, Hungary: visiting lecturer, November–December 2006,
2. University of Rome: visiting lecturer, November 1995,
3. University of Debrecen, Hungary: visiting lecturer, March 1995,
4. University of Budapest: visiting lecturer, January 1994,

=== Honours ===
- 2011: Lotz János Medal from the International Association for Hungarian Studies
- 2007: Officer's Cross of the Order of Merit of the Republic of Hungary
- 2003: G. F. Cushing Prize of the British-Hungarian Fellowship (London) for "outstanding contribution[s] to Hungarian linguistics, literary translation and for fostering appreciation of Hungarian culture in Great Britain"
- 2001: Pro Cultura Hungarica Hungarian State Prize for contributions to Anglo-Hungarian relations
- 1999: Prize of the Hungarian Milán Füst Foundation
- 2020: Budavári Tóth Árpád Műfordítói Díj,

=== Membership of professional organizations ===
- 2008–, Linguistic Society of America,
- 2008–, American Hungarian Educators' Association,
- 1996–2007, British Hungarian Fellowship (London) Executive Committee member,
- 1975 onwards, International Association of Hungarian Studies, Budapest,
- 1971 onwards, Philological Society, London,
- 1970 onwards, Suomalais-Ugrilainen Seura, Helsinki,

== Bibliography ==
=== Books ===
- A Concise Introduction to Hungarian London: School of Slavonic and East European Studies, University of London. 1996. 139 pp. SSEES Occasional Papers, 34. ISBN 0-903425-57-2
- Review: M. Kontra in: Modern Nyelvoktatás (Budapest) VII. évf. 2–3 sz. 2001. September; 102–104.
- The BUDALEX Guide to Hungarian [Distributed at the Third International Congress of the European Association for Lexicography, EURALEX, Budapest 4–9 September 1988]. Budapest: Akadémiai Kiadó. 1988. 12 pp.

=== Dictionary editing ===
- Oxford angol-magyar szótár nyelvtanulóknak English-Hungarian Wordpower Dictionary. Janet Phillips (publisher's editor), Peter Sherwood (senior editor). Oxford: Oxford University Press. 2002. 768 pp. ISBN 0-19-431531-2
  - New (revised) impression. 2003
  - Third impression 2004
  - Fourth (revised) impression 2006
- Awarded Outstanding Hungarian Dictionary prize by the Hungarian Academy of Sciences on the 4th Day of the Dictionary in Hungary, Budapest, 17 October 2007
- A Concise Hungarian-English Dictionary. Tamás Magay, László Országh (1907–1984), "Contributing Editor" (de facto co-editor) Peter Sherwood. Budapest: Akadémiai Kiadó and Oxford: Oxford University Press. 1990. 1144 pp
- Reviews:
  - Eyvor Fogarty Professional Translator and Interpreter (London) No. 3 1990, 43–44
  - R. J. W. Evans Slavonic and East European Review (London) Vol. 69 No. 4 (October 1991), 688
  - Jeffrey Harlig Slavic and East European Journal (USA) Vol. 36 No. 3 (Fall 1992), 376–378
  - Miklós Kontra Budapesti Könyvszemle (Budapest) Vol. 5 No. 3 (Autumn 1993), 377–380

== Book edited (Editors listed in alphabetical order) ==
- László Péter, Martyn Rady, Peter Sherwood (eds) Lajos Kossuth sent word ... Papers delivered on the occasion of the bicentenary of Kossuth's birth. SSEES Occasional Papers, 56. London: Hungarian Cultural Centre and School of Slavonic and East European Studies, University College London. 2003. 263 pp. ISBN 0-903425-67-X

== Teaching and edited ==
- Phrasal Verbs: Tanuljuk meg a 100 legfontosabbat! The 100 most important phrasal verbs of English for Hungarian students. Janet Phillips (publisher's editor), Peter Sherwood (senior editor). Oxford.: Oxford University Press. 2003. 122 pp. ISBN 0-19-431608-4

== Chapters ==
- 'Living through something: notes on the work of Imre Kertész' in: Ritchie Robertson, Joseph Sherman (eds) The Yiddish Presence in European Literature: Inspiration and Interaction. Proceedings of the Fourth and Fifth International Mendel Friedman Conference. Legenda Studies in Yiddish, 5. European Humanities Research Centre. Oxford: Oxbow Books. 2005. 108–116. ISBN 1-900755-83-1
- 'The label pre-socialist in Hungarian lexicography of the 1950s' in: R. B. Pynsent (ed) The Phoney Peace. Power and Culture in Central Europe 1945–1949. London: School of Slavonic and East European Studies/University College London. SSEES Occasional Papers, 46. 2000. 406–442. ISBN 0-903425-01-7
- "A nation may be said to live in its language": some socio-historical perspectives on attitudes to Hungarian' in: Robert B. Pynsent (ed) The Literature of Nationalism. Essays on East European Identity, London: SSEES/Macmillan. 1996. 27–39. ISBN (UK ED) 0-333-66682-8
- 'Hungarian' in: A. J. Walford and J. E. O. Screen (eds) A guide to foreign language courses and dictionaries, third edition revised and enlarged. London: The Library Association. 1977. 260–263.

== Peer-reviewed articles and papers ==
- Egy Márai-regény fordításának nyelvészeti problémái. The German and English translations of Sándor Márai's novel, A gyertyák csonkig égnek: Die Glut and Embers, Hungarológiai Évkönyv 2008. IX. évfolyam. Pécs: PTE BTK. 2008. 124–134. ISSN 1585-9673

== Published translations ==
=== Books ===
- Kázmér Nagy (Q65217432): St. Margaret of Scotland and Hungary. Glasgow: John Burns & Sons. 1973, 63 pp.
- Domokos Moldován (Q1178485)’s four film-scripts Love spells and death rites in Hungary. London: Institute of Contemporary Arts/Budapest: Gondolat Kiadó. 1986. 205 pp. ISBN 0905263316, ISBN 9632818121 (stitched)
- Béla Hamvas: Trees. Szentendre : Editio M, 2006, 64 pp. ISBN 963858789X
- Miklós Vámos: The Book of Fathers. London: Abacus (an imprint of Little, Brown Book Group Ltd.) 2006, 474 pp. ISBN 978-0-349-11930-4; ISBN 0-349-11930-9, ISBN 978-0-349-11931-1 (paperback format, reissued January 2007. 4th printing, June 2007)
- Imre Kertész: Europe’s oppressive legacy. In: Comparative Central European Holocaust studies, 2009. ISBN 9781557535269
- Noémi Szécsi: The Finno-Ugrian Vampire, London : Stork Press Ltd., 2012. 14 October, ISBN 9780957132665,
- Béla Hamvas: The Philosophy of Wine. Budapest : Medio, 2016, 115 pp., ISBN 9789639240575
- Antal Szerb: Reflections in the Library: selected literary essays 1926–1944. Cambridge: Legenda 2016. 132 pp. ISBN 9781781884614
- Ádám Bodor: The Birds of Verhovina. Jantar Publishing, 2022, 280 pp., ISBN 9781914990045
- Krisztina Tóth: Barcode. To be published on 1 December 2022, Jantar Publishing, 234 pp., ISBN 9781914990168

== Conferences ==
- 70 Years of Hungarian Studies at the University of London, UCL–SSEES, London, 2007
- 35 Years of Hungarian Studies at Szeged University, Szeged, 2006
