= Özgür Mumcu =

Turkish journalist

Özgür Mumcu (born 1977) is a Turkish writer and journalist. He works for the Cumhuriyet newspaper. His debut novel The Peace Machine was translated into English and was nominated for the EBRD Literature Prize.
