= PEN International =

Worldwide association of writers

- Formation: 1921; 105 years ago
- Type: NGO
- Purpose: Promote literature and defend freedom of expression worldwide.
- Headquarters: London
- Region served: International
- President: Burhan Sönmez
- Website: www.pen-international.org

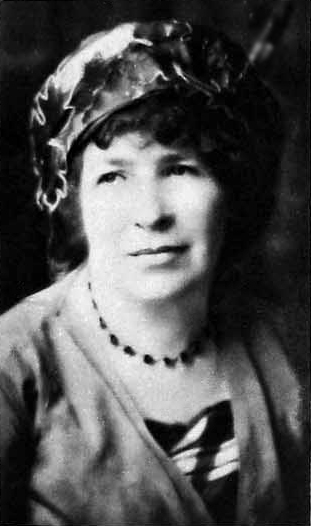
Catherine Amy Dawson Scott, co-founder of PEN International

PEN International (known as International PEN until 2010) is a worldwide association of writers, founded in London in 1921 to promote friendship and intellectual co-operation among writers everywhere. The association has autonomous International PEN centres in more than 100 countries.

Other goals included: to emphasise the role of literature in the development of mutual understanding and world culture; to fight for freedom of expression; and to act as a powerful voice on behalf of writers harassed, imprisoned, and sometimes killed for their views.

== History ==
The first PEN Club was founded at the Florence Restaurant in London on October 5, 1921, by Catherine Amy Dawson Scott, with John Galsworthy as its first president. Its first members included Joseph Conrad, Elizabeth Craig, George Bernard Shaw, and H. G. Wells.

PEN originally stood for "Poets, Essayists, Novelists", but later was changed to "Poets, Playwrights, Editors, Essayists, Novelists" and in 2010 included writers of any form of literature, such as journalists and historians.

The club established these aims:

1. To promote intellectual co-operation and understanding among writers;
2. To create a world community of writers that would emphasize the central role of literature in the development of world culture; and,
3. To defend literature against the many threats to its survival that the modern world poses.

The president of PEN International is Burhan Sönmez. Past presidents since Galsworthy have included E. M. Forster, Alberto Moravia, Heinrich Böll, Arthur Miller, Mario Vargas Llosa, Homero Aridjis, Jiří Gruša, John Ralston Saul and Jennifer Clement.

== Structure and status ==
PEN International has its headquarters in London and is composed of autonomous PEN Centres in more than 100 countries globally, each of which is open to writers, journalists, translators, historians, and others actively engaged in any branch of literature. It has five committees: Translation and Linguistic Rights, Writers for Peace, Writers in Prison, Women Writers and Young Writers.

It is a non-governmental organization in formal consultative relations with UNESCO and Special Consultative Status with the Economic and Social Council of the United Nations.

== Charter ==
PEN summarises its Charter, based on resolutions passed at its International Congresses:

PEN affirms that:

- Literature knows no frontiers and must remain common currency among people in spite of political or international upheavals.
- In all circumstances, and particularly in time of war, works of art, the patrimony of humanity at large, should be left untouched by national or political passion.
- Members of PEN should at all times use what influence they have in favour of good understanding and mutual respect between nations and people; they pledge themselves to do their utmost to dispel all hatreds and to champion the ideal of one humanity living in peace and equality in one world.
- PEN stands for the principle of unhampered transmission of thought within each nation and between all nations, and members pledge themselves to oppose any form of suppression of freedom of expression in the country and community to which they belong, as well as throughout the world wherever this is possible. PEN declares for a free press and opposes arbitrary censorship in time of peace. It believes that the necessary advance of the world towards a more highly organised political and economic order renders a free criticism of governments, administrations and institutions imperative. And since freedom implies voluntary restraint, members pledge themselves to oppose such evils of a free press as mendacious publication, deliberate falsehood and distortion of facts for political and personal ends.

== Women Writers Committee ==
Due to concerns about the lack of women involved at panel level in Pen International, writers such as Joanne Leedom-Ackerman, Betty Friedan, Grace Paley, and Meredith Tax pushed for change. This led to the foundation of the Women Writers Committee (WWC) in 1991 at the PEN Congress in Vienna. The aim of the WWC is to amplify and protect the voices of women and gender-diverse writers worldwide. The WWC has run human rights campaigns to support Taslima Nasrin (Bangladesh), Nawal al Saadawi (Egypt), Gao Yu (China), Pussy Riot (Russia), Narges Mohammadi (Iran), and others.

== Writers in Prison Committee ==
PEN International Writers in Prison Committee works on behalf of persecuted writers worldwide. Established in 1960 in response to increasing attempts to silence voices of dissent by imprisoning writers, the Writers in Prison Committee monitors the cases of as many as 900 writers annually who have been imprisoned, tortured, threatened, attacked, made to disappear, and killed for the peaceful practice of their profession. It publishes a bi-annual Case List documenting free expression violations against writers around the world.

The committee also coordinates the PEN International membership's campaigns that aim towards an end to these attacks and to the suppression of freedom of expression worldwide.

PEN International Writers in Prison Committee is a founding member of the International Freedom of Expression Exchange (IFEX), a global network of 90 non-governmental organisations that monitors censorship worldwide and defends journalists, writers, internet users, and others who are persecuted for exercising their right to freedom of expression.

It is also a member of IFEX's Tunisia Monitoring Group (TMG), a coalition of twenty-one free expression organisations that began lobbying the Tunisian government to improve its human rights record in 2005. Since the Arab Spring events that led to the collapse of the Tunisian government, TMG has worked to ensure constitutional guarantees of free expression and human rights within the country.

On 15 January 2016, PEN International joined human rights organisations Freemuse and the International Campaign for Human Rights in Iran, along with seven other organisations, to protest against the 2013 imprisonment and 2015 sentencing of musicians Mehdi Rajabian and Yousef Emadi, and filmmaker Hossein Rajabian, and called on the head of the judiciary and other Iranian authorities to drop the charges against them.

Ma Thida is the Chair of this committee.

== PEN affiliated awards ==
The various PEN affiliations offer many literary awards across a broad spectrum.

== Memorials ==
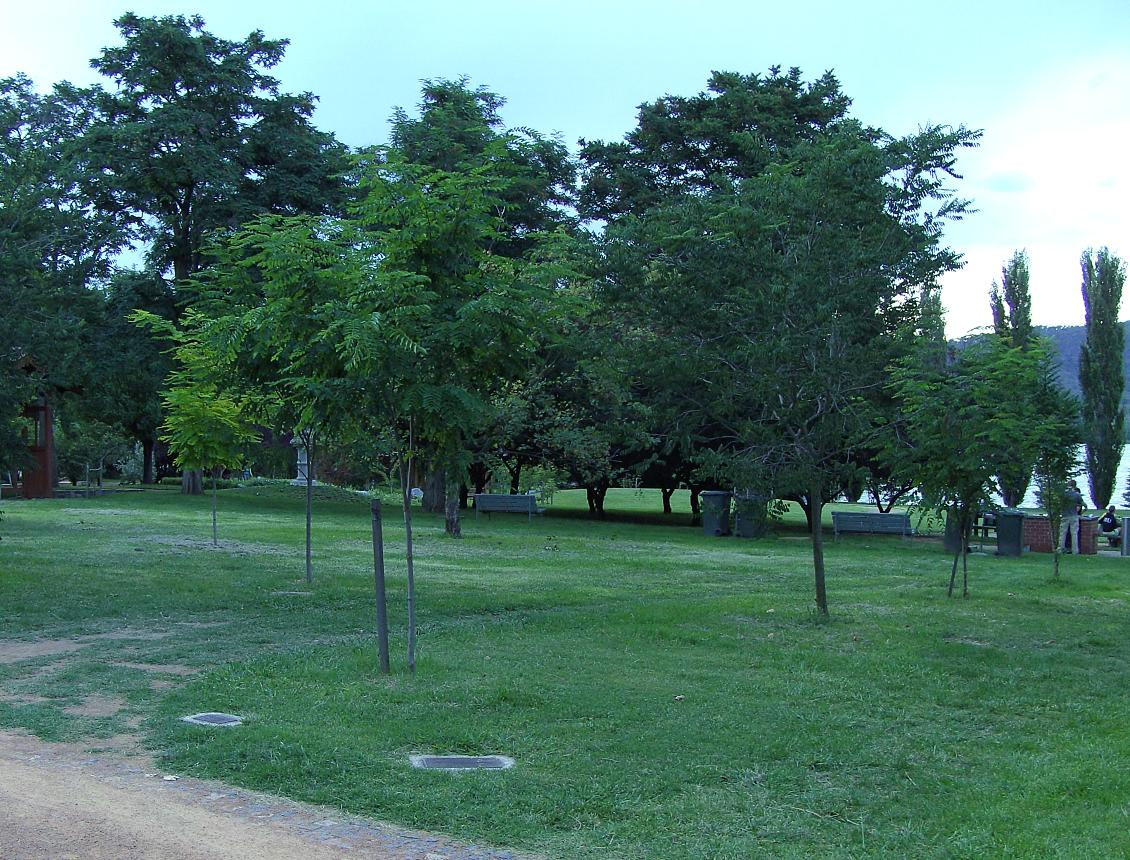
Memorial grove, Canberra, Australian Capital Territory

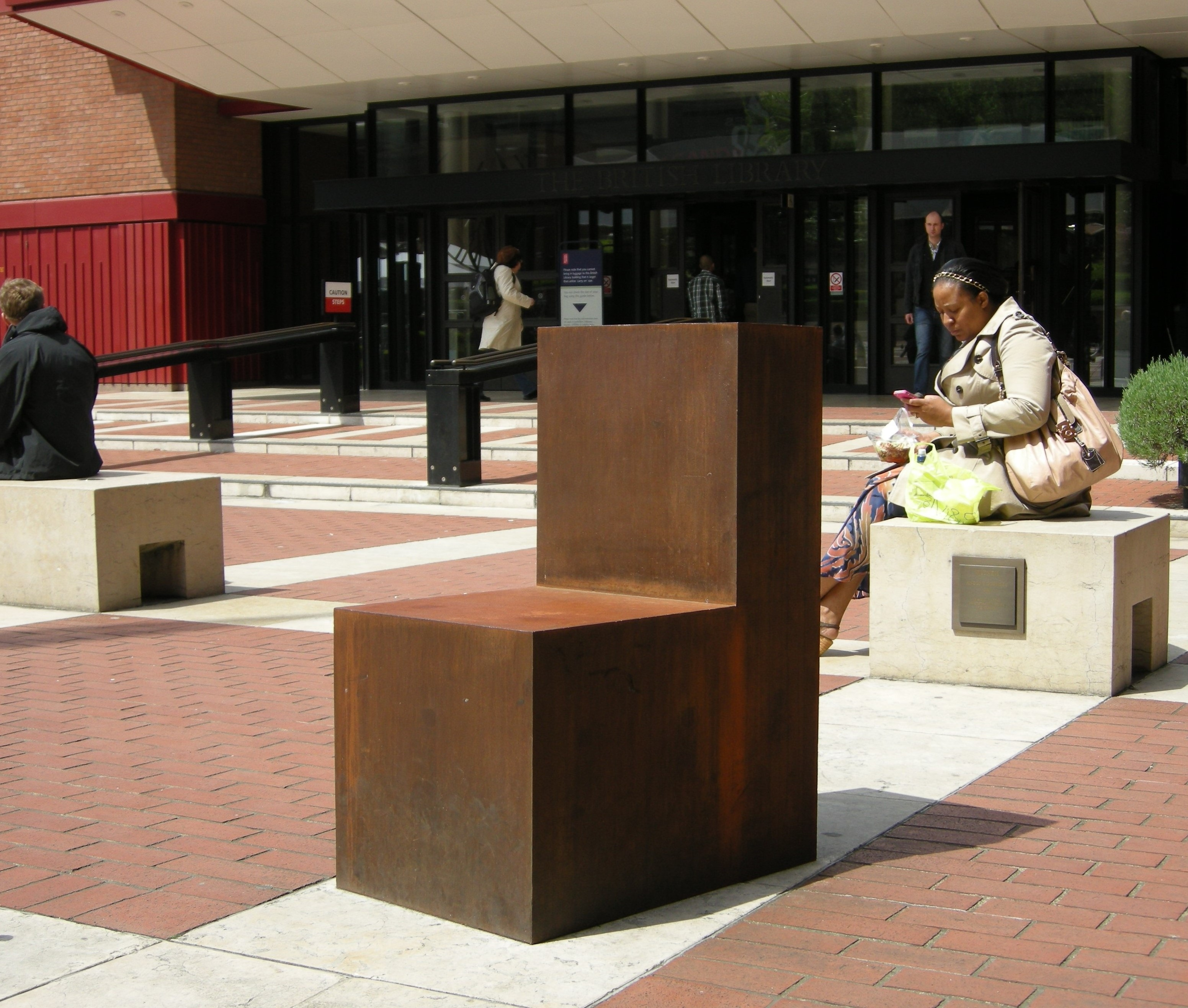
Antony Gormley's Witness, on the piazza of the British Library, London

A grove of trees beside Lake Burley Griffin forms the PEN International memorial in Canberra, Australian Capital Territory. The dedication reads: "The spirit dies in all of us who keep silent in the face of tyranny." The memorial was officially opened on 17 November 1997.

A cast-iron sculpture entitled Witness, commissioned by English PEN to mark their 90th anniversary and created by Antony Gormley, stands outside the British Library in London. It depicts an empty chair and is inspired by the symbol used for 30 years by English PEN to represent imprisoned writers around the world. It was unveiled on 13 December 2011.

== Notable members ==
- Homero Aridjis, President Emeritus.
- Jerzy Kosinski
- Carmen Aristegui
- Margaret Atwood
- Thomas G. Bergin
- Heinrich Böll
- Jorge Luis Borges
- Karel Čapek
- J. M. Coetzee
- Joseph Conrad
- Elizabeth Craig
- Sidney Dark
- Maria Dąbrowska
- Ashraf Fayadh
- Hermann Friedmann
- Nadine Gordimer
- Gloria Guardia
- Zofia Kossak-Szczucka
- Theodor Kramer
- Robie Macauley
- Thomas Mann
- Predrag Matvejević
- Arthur Miller
- Charles Langbridge Morgan
- Toni Morrison
- Zofia Nałkowska
- Octavio Paz
- Harold Pinter
- J. K. Rowling
- Michael Scammell
- George Bernard Shaw
- Mieczysław Smolarski
- William Styron
- Carl Tighe
- Luisa Valenzuela
- B. Wongar

== Presidents ==
PEN International presidents
John Galsworthy	1921–1932
H. G. Wells	1932–1935
Jules Romains	1936–1939
Wartime Presidential Committee: Hu Shih (1941–47); Denis Saurat (1941–47); H. G. Wells (1941–46); Hermon Ould (1941–47); Thornton Wilder (1941–47); E. M. Forster (1946–47); François Mauriac (1946–47); Ignazio Silone (1946–47)	1941–1947
Maurice Maeterlinck	1947–1949
Benedetto Croce	1949–1953
Charles Langbridge Morgan	1954–1956
Andre Chamson	1957–1959
Alberto Moravia	1960–1962
Victor E. van Vriesland	1963–1965
Arthur Miller	1966–1969
Pierre Emmanuel	1970–1971
Heinrich Böll	1972–1973
V. S. Pritchett	1974–1976
Mario Vargas Llosa	1977–1979
Per Wästberg	1979–1986
Francis King	1986–1989
René Tavernier	May–November 1989
Per Wästberg (Interim)	November 1989 – May 1990
György Konrád	1990–1993
Ronald Harwood	1993–1997
Homero Aridjis	1997–2003
Jiri Grusa	2003–2009
John Ralston Saul	2009–2015
Jennifer Clement	2015–2021
Burhan Sönmez	2021–

== See also ==
- Day of the Imprisoned Writer
- International Freedom of Expression Exchange
- International PEN centers – 145+ PEN centers around the world.
  - English PEN – The founding centre of PEN International, located in London.
  - PEN America – Located in New York City.
  - PEN Canada – Located in Toronto, Canada.
  - Sydney PEN – One of the three PEN centers of Australia, located in Sydney.
  - PEN Centre Germany – Established in 1924.
  - Hungarian PEN Club – Established in 1926.
  - PEN Ukraine – Established in 1989.
  - Esperanto PEN Centre – Established in 1991, representing Esperanto writers.
- PEN literary awards – as awarded by and in conjunction with PEN centers around the world.
- Tunisia Monitoring Group

== Bibliography ==
- Mauthner, Martin (2007). German Writers in French Exile, 1933–1940 (1st publ. ed.). London: Valentine Mitchell. ISBN 978-0-85303-540-4..
- Pen International: An Illustrated History: Literature Knows No Frontiers, by Carles Torner, Jennifer Clement, Peter D. McDonald, Jan Martens, Ginevra Avalle, Rachel Potter, and Laetitia Zecchini, 2021. Northampton, Massachusetts: Interlink Books, an imprint of Interlink Publishing Group.
