= Uršuľa Kovalyk =

Slovak writer and playwright (born 1969)

Uršuľa Kovalyk (born 1969) is a Slovak writer and playwright.

== Biography ==
Born in 1969 in Košice, Slovakia, she is best known for her novel The Equestrienne (2013), which won the Bibliotéka Prize in 2013, and was also nominated for the Anasoft Award and the EBRD Book Prize. In addition, she has written several short story collections, such as A Pure Animal (2018).

Kovalyk is the co-founder and director of a theatre group for the marginalized, called Theatre Without a Home. Her early novels are set against the backdrop of the end of socialist Czechoslovakia, while her more recent works are set in post-communist Slovakia.
