= Mahir Ünsal Eriş =

Turkish author

- Born: 20 October 1980; Çanakkale, Turkey
- Occupation: Writer, translator
- Genre: Literary fiction, Short stories

Mahir Ünsal Eriş (born 20 October 1980) is a contemporary Turkish writer known for his short stories, novels, and translations.

== Works ==
Eriş’s first short story collection, Bangır Bangır Ferdi Çalıyor Evde, was published in 2012. His second book, Olduğu Kadar Güzeldik, was a short story collection as well, which was granted the Sait Faik Short Story Award in 2014.

In his first novel, Dünya Bu Kadar, which was published in 2015, Eriş was exploring new ways of narrative and reflecting his interest in storytelling and modern literature. His most recent short story collections Sarıyaz and Kara Yarısı were published simultaneously in 2019. In 2020, Eriş wrote a serial novel, Gaip for the audiobook streaming service Storytel.

== Bibliography ==
=== Short stories ===
- Bangır Bangır Ferdi Çalıyor Evde, İstanbul, 2012, İletişim Yayınları
- Olduğu Kadar Güzeldik, İstanbul, 2013, İletişim Yayınları
- Sarıyaz, İstanbul, 2019, Can Yayınları
- Kara Yarısı, İstanbul, 2019, Can Yayınları

=== Novels ===
- Dünya Bu Kadar, İstanbul, 2015, İletişim Yayınları

=== Illustrated novels ===
- Öbürküler, İstanbul, 2017, Karakarga
- Diğerleri, İstanbul, 2020, Karakarga

=== Serial novels ===
- Gaip, 2020, Storytel
