= Crossing Continents =

- Genre: Foreign affairs documentary
- Running time: 28 minutes
- Country of origin: United Kingdom
- Home station: BBC Radio 4

Crossing Continents is a half-hour BBC Radio 4 documentary strand focusing on foreign affairs issues. It takes listeners right to the heart of story through its on-location reporting and feature making. The programmes are character driven and offer powerful storytelling and a deep understanding of the context in which events take place no matter where they are in the world. Crossing Continents is broadcast 28 times a year on Thursdays at 11:00, with repeats on Mondays at 20:30 and is available from the BBC as a podcast as well as on iPlayer and via on-demand.

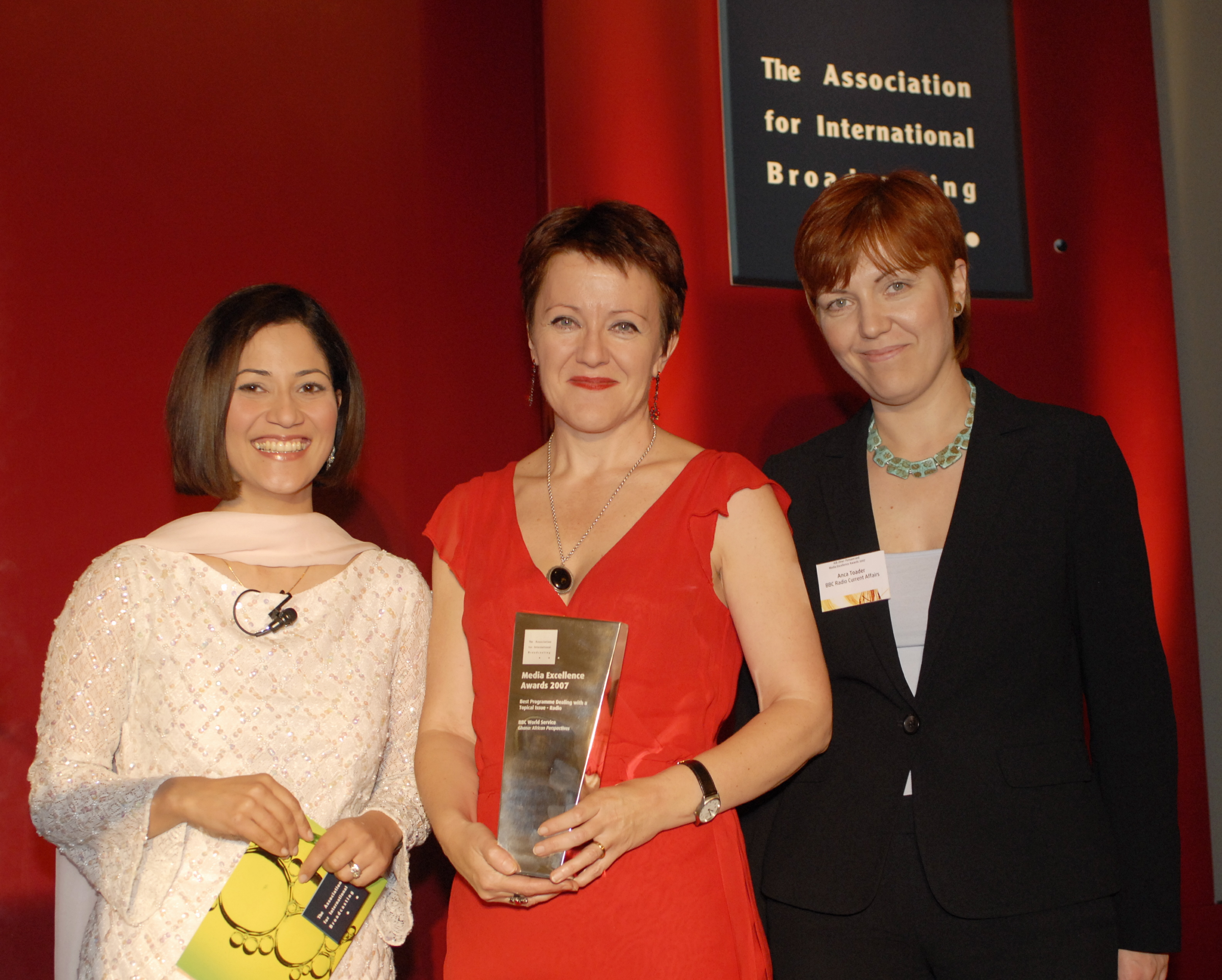
Rosie Goldsmith and Anca Toada accepting the AIB award in 2007 from Mishal Husain

Crossing Continents has received many awards including from the Foreign Press Association Awards; One World Media Awards; Amnesty International Awards and some Sony Awards. Its most recent success was Best Radio Award at the Amnesty International Awards 2016 for Stealing Innocence in Malawi reported by Ed Butler.

== See also ==
- From Our Own Correspondent
- List of BBC Radio 4 programmes
