= Grete Bloch =

- Born: March 21, 1892; Berlin, Germany
- Died: 1944 (aged 51–52); Auschwitz-Birkenau, Poland

Margarete Bloch (21 March 1892 – Precise date unknown, 1944, Auschwitz concentration camp) was a friend of Felice Bauer and a pen-friend of Franz Kafka.

Grete Bloch was born in Berlin, a daughter of the sales representative Louis Bloch and Jenny Bloch, born Meyerowitz. She visited a girls’ school (Höhere Töchterschule) and then two schools for learning a profession: a school of the Lette-Verein (Education for women; founded in the 19th century and still existing) and the academy for trade Salomon in Berlin. At age 16, after finishing her education, she found work in the office machine industry and helped supplement the family income. From 1908 to 1915 she worked in Berlin and Vienna. Before October 1913, she met Felice Bauer, who was four years older, and they became friends.

Felice Bauer had been in a relationship with Franz Kafka since August 1912. This was actually a correspondence relationship. Kafka lived in Prague and Bauer in Berlin. We know that he wrote her three letters a day, letters that are today seen as world literature. During this time he also wrote the novel Das Urteil (The Judgement) and parts of the novel Der Verschollene (The Missing; later the English book: The Man who Disappeared; in other languages often: America). But the relationship itself remained undefined. Grete Bloch wanted to help Felice Bauer in this regard and stopped in Prague during a business trip between Berlin and Vienna. She met Franz Kafka at the Hotel Schwarzes Ross (Black Steed) in order to persuade him to meet Felice in person in Berlin. But the result was that Kafka also started an intensive pen-relationship with her, in which he used her as a ‘wailing wall’ and where her private problems also became subjects of discussion. On 7 April 1914 he sent her a book of Franz Grillparzer: The Poor Musician (Der arme Spielmann).

After being informed that Felice Bauer and Franz Kafka had become engaged (on 1 June 1914) she decided to show Bauer the compromising letters Kafka had sent to her (after scissoring out any too intimate details). On 12 July, Grete Bloch, Felice Bauer and her sister Erna Bauer went to the Hotel Askanischer Hof where Franz Kafka was staying. The three women confronted the doctor of law Kafka with his letters to Grete Bloch. The result was the breakup of the engagement. Kafka saw Grete Bloch as an evil genius and the whole gathering as a kind of trial (Diary of 23 July 1914). It took him months to get over this. Then he wrote his famous novel Der Prozess (The Trial). In this (contrary to what happened in the Hotel Askanischer Hof) the accusation was unknown and the accused had to prove his innocence. So it is probable that Grete Bloch, contrary to her intention, caused Felice and Franz to break up and made Kafka write his great novel.

From December 1915 Bloch worked for Adrema-Maschinenbaugesellschaft mbH, a company which made addressing machines. She was secretary to Julius Goldschmidt and later a "Prokuristin", an authorised signatory for this company. So she became one of the best paid women in the Weimar Republic.

After the Nazi takeover of power in 1933 Jews were, from September 1935, not allowed to work or own businesses such as this. Goldschmidt was forced into Swiss exile. Bloch helped him to rebuild the business there, but he died in 1936 and the new business failed. For some time Bloch stayed with Felice Bauer-Marasse in Geneva, then she went to her brother Hans in Palestine. But she could not settle there and went back to Europe, Florence, in then fascist Italy, where she lived from writing.

In Italy Grete Bloch experienced difficulties as a Jew but managed to get by. After the Germans occupied Italy in September 1943, she fled to a mountain village but was arrested in May 1944. She was deported to Auschwitz and murdered. The 28 letters from Kafka she gave to her Italian teacher. They are now kept in Marbach (Germany).
