= Jennifer Clement =

American-Mexican author (born 1960)

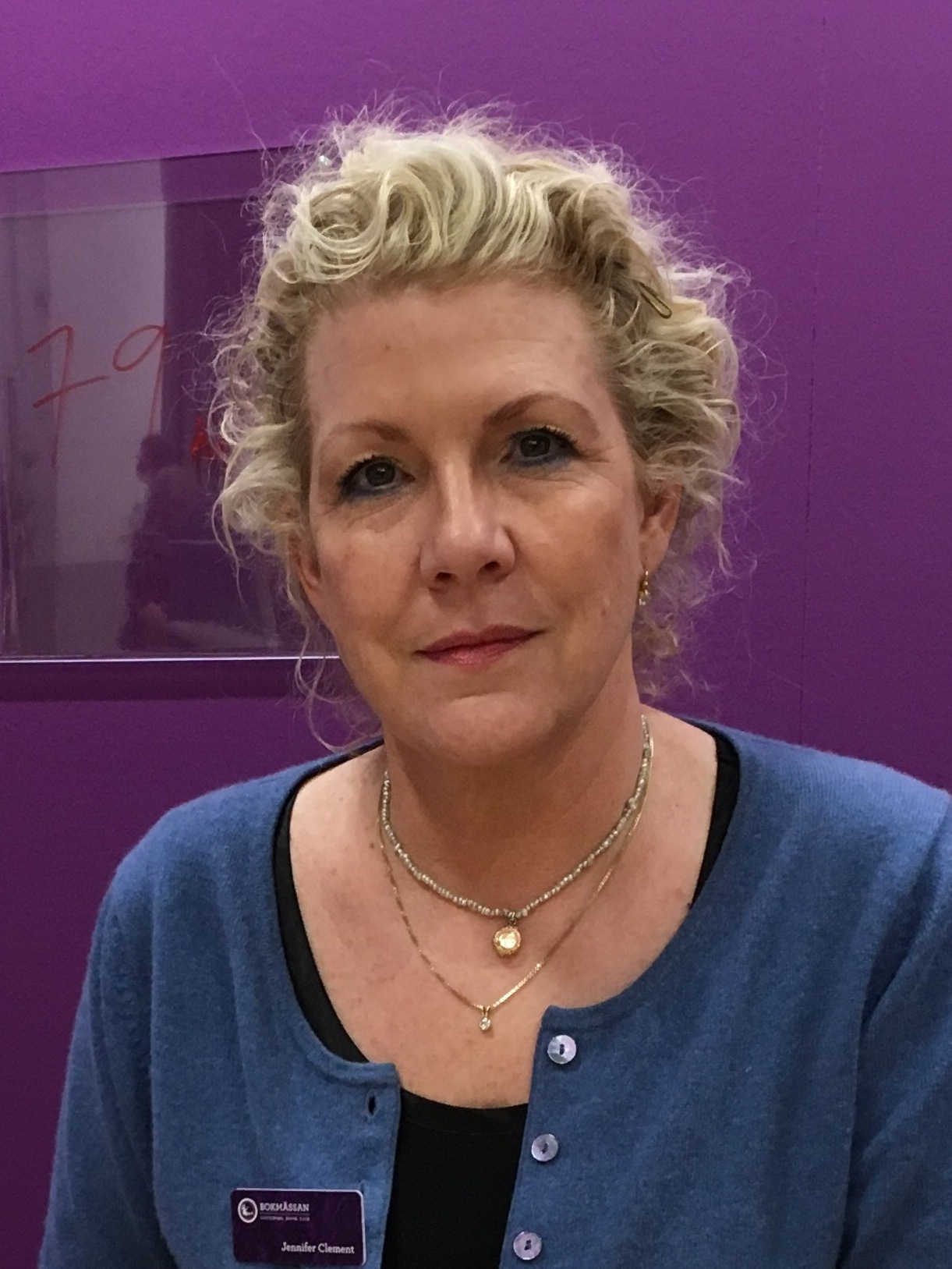
- Clement at the Gothenburg Book Fair in 2016
- Born: 1960 (age 65–66); Greenwich, Connecticut, U.S.
- Education: New York University (BA); University of Southern Maine (MFA)
- Occupation: Author
- Writing career
- Notable works: Widow Basquiat, A True Story Based on Lies, Prayers for the Stolen, Gun Love
- Notable awards: National Endowment for the Arts Fellowship in Literature, The Canongate Prize, Sara Curry Humanitarian Award, Guggenheim Fellowship

President of PEN International
- In office October 2015 – October 2021
- Preceded by: John Ralston Saul
- Succeeded by: Burhan Sönmez

Jennifer Clement (born 1960) is an American-Mexican author. Clement has written several novels, including Gun Love (2018) and Prayers for the Stolen (2014), and published several collections of poetry and the memoirs Widow Basquiat (2001) and The Promised Party (2024). She is president emerita of PEN International, and was the first and only woman to be elected to this position (2015).

== Early life and education ==
Born in 1960 in Greenwich, Connecticut, Clement moved in 1961 with her family to Mexico City, where she later attended Edron Academy. She moved to the United States to finish high school at Cranbrook Kingswood School, before studying English Literature and Anthropology at New York University. She received her MFA from the University of Southern Maine.

She is the co-director and founder, with her sister Barbara Sibley, of the San Miguel Poetry Week. Clement lives in Mexico City, Mexico.

== Writing career ==
Clement's first book, Widow Basquiat, is a memoir about artist Jean-Michel Basquiat's relationship with his muse Suzanne Mallouk—told from Mallouk's perspective. It was originally published in 2000 and re-released in 2014 as Widow Basquiat: A Love Story. Glenn O'Brien in Artforum wrote: "Magical…Widow Basquiat conjures real characters, a real time and real place. It's not theory – it's representation. … The life of Basquiat … is a joyous lightning bolt when it is described in true detail, as it is in Clement's extraordinary as-told-to poem."

Her first novel, A True Story Based on Lies, was a finalist in the Orange Prize for Fiction.

Prayers for the Stolen came out in 2014 and became a New York Times Book Review Editor's Choice Book, First Selection for National Reading Group Month's Great Group Reads, and appeared internationally on many "Best Books of the Year" lists, including The Irish Times.

Auf der Zunge ("On the Tip of the Tongue"), was published by Suhrkamp in Germany in April 2022.

Clement is also the author of several books of poetry: The Next Stranger with an introduction by W. S. Merwin (1993), Newton's Sailor, Lady of the Broom (2002) and Jennifer Clement: New and Selected Poems (2008).

Her prize-winning story A Salamander-Child is published as an art book, with work by the Mexican painter Gustavo Monroy.

== Other activities ==
She is a member of Mexico's prestigious Sistema Nacional de Creadores de Arte. Jennifer Clement, along with her sister Barbara Sibley, is the founder and director The San Miguel Poetry Week.

She served as President of PEN Mexico from 2009 to 2012. In 2015, she was elected as the first woman president of PEN International, an organization founded in 1921. Under her leadership, the groundbreaking PEN International Women's Manifesto and The Democracy of the Imagination Manifesto were created.

As president of PEN Mexico she spoke extensively about the safety of journalists in Mexico and was instrumental in raising the issue and changing the law so that the killing of a journalist became a federal crime.

In 2021 she was one of the authors who produced Pen International: An Illustrated History: Literature Knows No Frontiers.

== Film ==
- Prayers for the Stolen, directed by Tatiana Huezo (titled Noche de fuego) and produced by Nicolas Celis and Jim Stark at Pimienta Films was Mexico's entry for the 2022 Oscars. Among many prizes, the film was awarded the Cannes Film Festival's Un Certain Regard Award.
- Gun Love, directed by Julie Taymor and produced by Nick Wechsler and Chockstone Pictures partners Steve Schwartz and Paula Mae Schwartz as well as Lynn Hendee and Julie Taymor.

== Recognition and awards ==
Clement was awarded the National Endowment of the Arts Fellowship for Literature in 2012 for her novel Prayers for the Stolen and was honored with The Sara Curry Humanitarian Award for that work. She is also the recipient of the UK's Canongate Prize. Clement is a Santa Maddalena Foundation Fellow, the MacDowell Colony's Robert and Stephanie Olmsted Fellow for 2007-08 and, in 2015, was chosen to be a City of Asylum Resident in Pittsburgh, PA. In 2016, she was awarded a Guggenheim Fellowship for her new novel Gun Love. Gun Love was named one of Time magazine's top 10 books of 2019 and was also a New York Times Editor's Choice Book, and a National Book Award finalist, among other honors.

Clement's books have been translated into 36 languages.

Other honors and awards include:

- Sydney Harman Writer-in-Residence, Baruch College (City University of New York), 2020
- Gun Love: National Book Award, finalist, 2018
- Gun Love: Time magazine top 10 books of 2019
- Gun Love: A New York Times Editor's Choice Book, 2018
- Guggenheim Fellowship, US, 2016
- HIPGiver Honor (honoring Latinos who have made exceptional contributions to their communities), US, 2016
- Hermitage Residency, US, 2016
- Grand Prix des Lectrices Lyceenes de Elle (sponsored by Elle Magazine, the French Ministry of Education and Maison des écrivains et de la littérature) France, 2015
- PEN/Faulkner Award for Fiction Finalist, US, 2015
- City of Asylum Resident, Pittsburgh, PA, US, 2015
- Community College of Baltimore County, Essex - Prayers for the Stolen: selected novel for the Community Book Connection Program 2015–2106
- The Irish Times Best Books List 2014
- The Sara Curry Humanitarian Award, 2014
- Santa Maddalena Foundation Fellowship, Italy, 2014
- Shortlist Prix Femina, France, 2014
- Prayers for the Stolen: A New York Times Editor's Choice Book, 2014
- National Endowment for the Arts Fellowship in Fiction, 2012
- President of PEN Mexico, 2009–2012
- The Sandburg-Auden-Stein Poet-in-Residence, Olivet College, 2011
- Writer-in-Residence Pen, Vlaanderen, Antwerp, Belgium, 2010
- The Thornton Writer-in-Residence, Lynchburg College, VA, 2009
- Robert and Stephanie Olmsted Fellow, 2007–2008 (awarded by The MacDowell Colony)
- MacDowell Colony Fellowship, 2007
- Residency in Berlin granted by the Goethe Institute and Literarisches Colloquium Berlin, 2004
- Finalist in the Orange Prize for Fiction, 2002, UK (for A True Story Based on Lies)
- The Canongate Prize for New Writing 2001, UK (judged by The Herald, The Sunday Herald, Waterstone's, Channel Four, BBC, and Canongate Books)
- The Bookseller's Choice List, 2000, UK (for the memoir Widow Basquiat)
- U.S.-Mexico Fund for Culture (Conaculta/Fonca/Bancomer/The Rockefeller Foundation) grant in support of The San Miguel Poetry Week
- Member of Mexico's "Sistema Nacional de Creadores", FONCA, Mexico.

Non-profit organization positions
Preceded by John Ralston Saul	International President of PEN International; 2015–Present	Succeeded by incumbent
