= Monika Kompaníková =

Slovak writer, editor and publisher

Monika Kompaníková (born 1979) is a Slovak writer, editor and publisher. She studied painting at the Academy of Fine Arts in Bratislava. She has written books for adults as well as books for children, and has won many prizes. In addition, she has also written lyrics, journal columns, and reportage pieces. She works at the Slovak newspaper Denník N.

Her work has been translated into 15 languages. In 2011, she won the Anasoft Litera Prize for her novel Piata loď, (Boat Number Five, 2010). The film version, titled Little Harbour, won the Crystal Bear at the Berlinale Film Festival in 2017.
