= Felice Bauer =

Businesswoman and fiancée of Franz Kafka

- Born: 18 November 1887; Neustadt, Upper Silesia (now Prudnik, Poland)
- Died: 15 October 1960 (aged 72); Rye, New York, United States
- Known for: Fiancée of Franz Kafka

Felice Bauer (18 November 1887 – 15 October 1960) was a fiancée of Franz Kafka, whose letters to her were published as Letters to Felice.

== Early life ==
Felice Bauer was born in Neustadt in Upper Silesia (today Prudnik), into a Jewish family. Her father Carl Bauer was an insurance agent, her mother Anna, née Danziger was the daughter of a local dyer. Felice had four siblings: Else (1883–1952), Ferdinand (called Ferri, 1884–1952), Erna (1885–1978) and Antonie (called Toni, 1892–1918). In 1899 the family moved to Berlin.

Felice began attending a Handelsschule, a vocational school for commerce, but had to give it up in 1908 because her family could not afford it. From 1909 on, she worked as a stenographer at the Berlin record company Odeon. One year later, she moved to the Carl Lindström Company, a manufacturer of gramophones and "Parlographs", then the most advanced dictation machines. After a short while she was promoted. She worked in marketing and represented the company at trade fairs. In April 1915 she began working at the Technische Werkstätte Berlin. She contributed substantially to the income of her family.

== Kafka ==
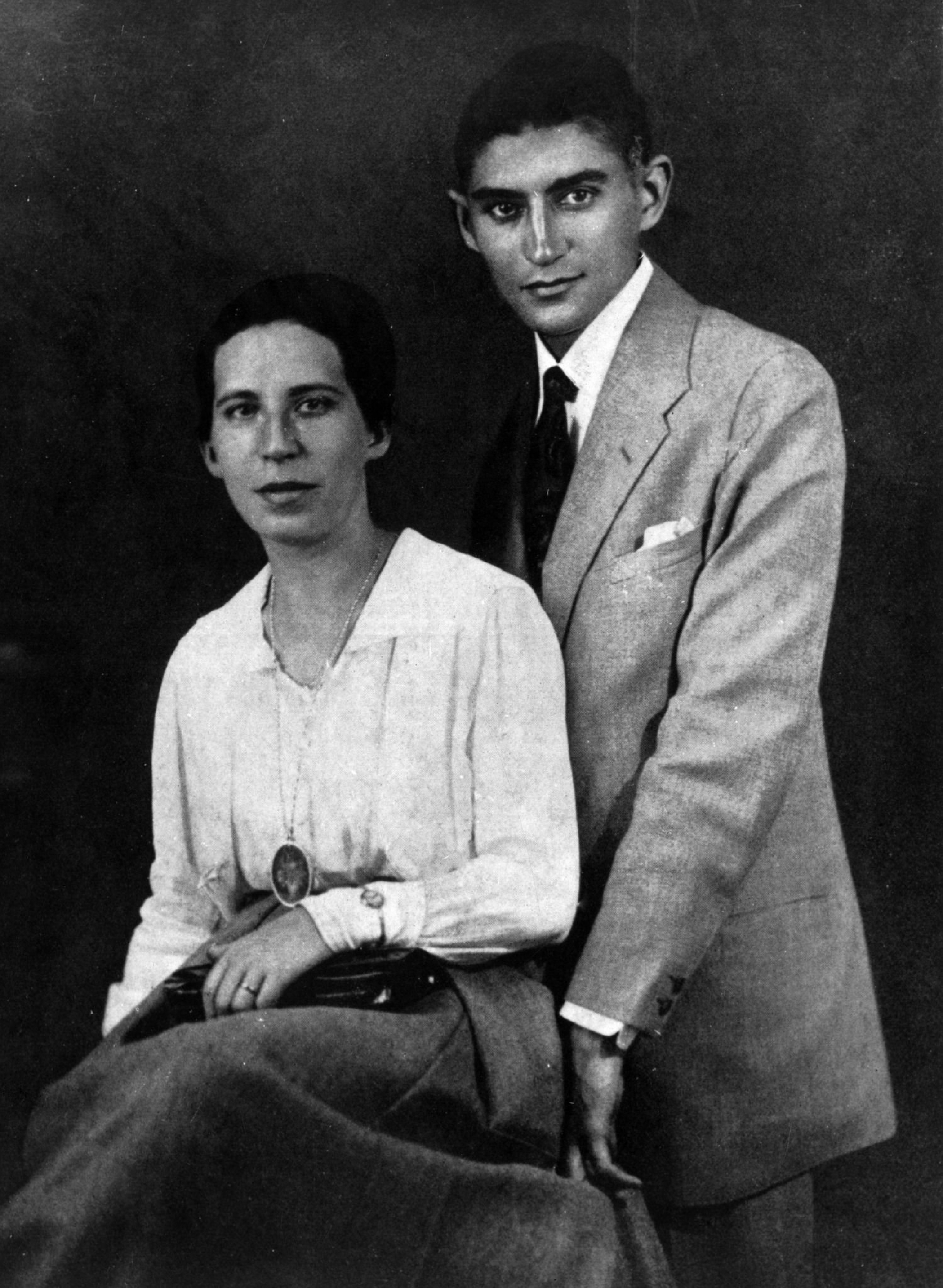
Felice Bauer and Franz Kafka

Felice met Franz Kafka in Prague on 13 August 1912, when he visited his friend Max Brod and his wife. Brod's sister Sophie was married to a cousin of Felice's; Felice was in Prague on a trip to Budapest to visit her sister Else. A week after the meeting, on 20 August, Kafka entered in his diary:

Miss FB. When I arrived at Brod's on 13 August, she was sitting at the table. I was not at all curious about who she was, but rather took her for granted at once. Bony, empty face that wore its emptiness openly. Bare throat. A blouse thrown on. Looked very domestic in her dress although, as it turned out, she by no means was. (I alienate myself from her a little by inspecting her so closely ...) Almost broken nose. Blonde, somewhat straight, unattractive hair, strong chin. As I was taking my seat I looked at her closely for the first time, by the time I was seated I already had an unshakeable opinion.

Soon after the meeting he began to send her almost daily letters, expressing disappointment if she did not respond as frequently. He dedicated to her his short story "The Judgment" (also translated "The Verdict"), which he had written the night of 22 September 1912. They met again for Easter of 1913, and he proposed marriage in a letter at the end of July that year. The engagement took place on the Jewish holiday of Shavuot, Sunday 31 May 1914, in the presence of Kafka's parents and sister Ottla, but was broken a few weeks later, in August.

After difficult communication, again mostly in letters, and spending ten days together in Marienbad in July 1916, they met for a second engagement on 12 July 1917, planning to marry soon and live together in Prague. Suffering symptoms of the tuberculosis that was to lead to his death, Kafka broke the engagement again in December that year. She departed on 27 December.

Flip book used to promote the Carl Lindström AG Parlograph, featuring Felice Bauer

She saved Kafka's more than 500 letters to her, which were published as Letters to Felice; her letters to him did not survive. Elias Canetti titled his book on the letters Kafka's Other Trial: The Letters to Felice, alluding to Kafka's novel The Trial, which Canetti describes as "a novel ... in which Kafka's engagement to Felice is reimagined as the mysterious and menacing arrest of the hero". Michiko Kakutani notes in her review for The New York Times, "Kafka's Kafkaesque Love Letters", that Kafka's correspondence with Felice:

has all the earmarks of his fiction: the same nervous attention to minute particulars; the same paranoid awareness of shifting balances of power; the same atmosphere of emotional suffocation – combined, surprisingly enough, with moments of boyish ardor and delight.

== Later life ==
In 1919, she married Moritz Marasse, a partner in a private bank in Berlin. They had two children, Heinz (1920–2012) and Ursula (1921–1966). With the rise of the Nazis in the 1930 elections, the family moved to Switzerland, with financial loss. They settled there in 1931 and moved to the United States in 1936. She ran a store selling knitting ware made by her and her sister Else. Her husband died in 1950. In financial trouble due to an illness, she sold her letters from Kafka to the publisher Salman Schocken in 1955. She died in Rye, New York.

== Legacy and cultural references ==
The musician Adam Green is her great-grandson.

In her solo play with music Felice to Franz (1992), performance artist Claudia Stevens portrays Felice as she responds to Kafka's letters. The play's text recreates the letters Felice might have written to Franz.

In the 2011 BBC radio play Kafka the Musical, written by Murray Gold, the character Felice was played by Jessica Raine.

In the 2012 world premiere of the stage adaptation Kafka the Musical (written by Murray Gold and produced by Theatre Inconnu, in Victoria B.C.) the character Felice was played by Holly Jonson.

In 2022, Czech author Magdaléna Platzová published Život po Kafkovi ("Life after Kafka"), a biographical novel about Bauer's life in the United States.

== Literature ==
- Elias Canetti: Der andere Prozeß. Kafkas Briefe an Felice, Leipzig, Reclam 1985.
- Louis Begley: Die ungeheure Welt, die ich im Kopfe habe. Deutsche Verlagsanstalt, Munich 2008, ISBN 978-3-421-04362-7, p. 125
- Unda Hörner: Kafka und Felice. Roman. Berlin, ebersbach & simon 2017.
