= Magdaléna Platzová =

Czech writer (born 1972)

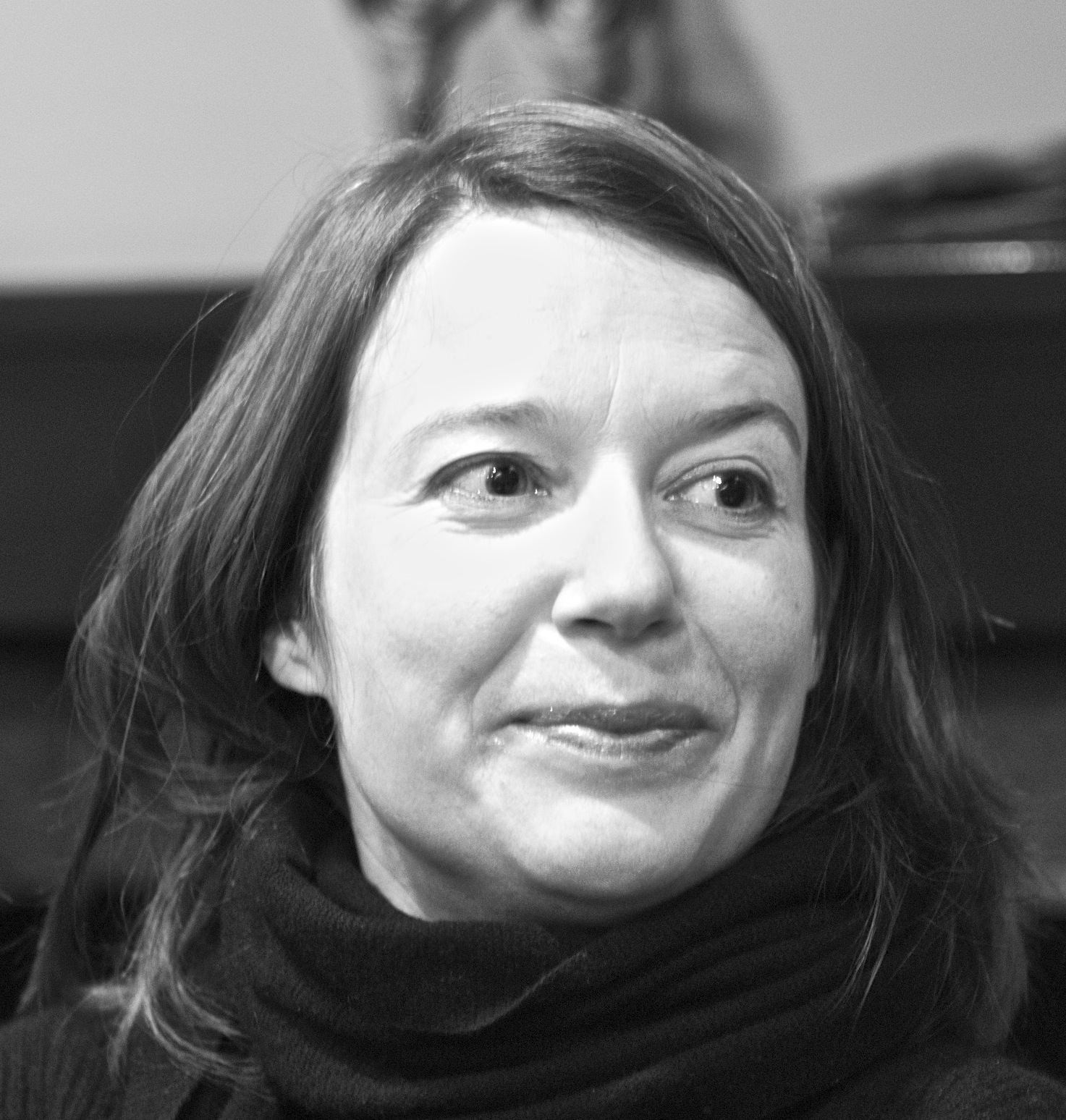
- Born: 8 March 1972 (age 54); Prague, Czechoslovakia
- Writing career
- Genres: Novel, short story, play

Magdaléna Platzová (born 8 March 1972) is a Czech writer.

== Biography ==
The daughter of Eda Kriseová, a journalist, and Josef Platz, a director of documentaries, she was born in Prague. She was educated in Washington, D.C., and England; Platzová received a MA in philosophy from Charles University. During her twenties, she was a member of a Franco-Czech theater group. In the late 1990s, she was assistant to Petr Lébl at the Theatre on the Balustrade. From 2009 to 2012, she lived in New York City; she taught a course on Franz Kafka at the Gallatin School of Individualized Study. She is an editor and contributor on cultural topics to Czech newspapers Respekt and Literární noviny. Since 2012, Platzová has lived in Lyon, France.

In 2003, she published a collection of short stories Sůl, ovce a kamení ("Salt, Sheep and Stone"). Her plays Na útěku ("On the Run") and Sayang were finalists for the Alfréd Radok Awards.

Her work has been translated into English, German, Dutch, Swedish, Croat, Slovenian and French.

== Selected work ==
- Návrat přítelkyně ("The Return of a Friend"), novella (2004)
- Aaronův skok, novel (2006), translated to English as Aaron's Leap (2014)
- Recyklovaný muž ("The Recycled Man"), short stories (2008)
- Toník a jeskyně snů ("Tonik and the Cave of Dreams"), children's book (2010)
- Anarchista ("The Attempt"), novel (2013), translated into English as The Attempt (2016)
- Druhá strana ticha ("The Other Side of Silence") (2018)
- Máme holý ruce ("Our Hands are Bare"),(2019), book for young adults on the Velvet Revolution
- Život po Kafkovi ("Life after Kafka") (2022), novel about Felice Bauer.
- Fáze jedné ženy (One Woman Phase) (2025), short stories
