= Sine Ergün =

Turkish writer (born 1982)

Sine Ergün (born 1982) is a Turkish writer. She has published three books till date. Her second book Bazen Hayat won the Sait Faik Short Story Award, while her third book Baştankara won the EU Prize for Literature. She has edited Notos magazine, and is the founding director of the art initiative Maumau.

== Books ==
- Burası Tekin Değil (It's not Safe Here, Yitik Ülke Publishing, 2010; Can Publishing, 2012),
- Bazen Hayat (Life, Sometimes, Can Publishing, 2012) and
- Baştankara (Titmouse, Can Publishing, 2016).
