= Kâmuran Şipal =

Turkish novelist, story writer, and translator (1926–2019)

Kâmuran Şipal (1926, Adana – 18 September 2019, Istanbul), was a Turkish novelist, story writer and translator.

Şipal graduated from Istanbul University Faculty of Letters, German Language Department. In the following years, he translated from German to Turkish, such German writers as Franz Kafka, Alfred Adler, Ingeborg Bachmann, Wolfgang Borchert, Heinrich Böll, Alfred Brauchle, Bertolt Brecht, Max Brod, Elias Canetti, Sigmund Freud, Gustav Hans Graber, Günter Grass, Carl Gustav Jung, Thomas Mann, Rainer Maria Rilke, Robert Musil, Bernhard Zeller, Hans Zulliger and Hermann Hesse. Şipal won the Turkish Language Association Story Contest in 1953. He received a Sait Faik Story Award for his novel named Elbiseciler Çarşısı and seven years before his death, was awarded the Orhan Kemal Novel Award (2011) for his novel named Sırrımsın Sırdaşımsın.

== Works ==
=== Story ===
- Beyhan (1962)
- Elbiseciler Çarşısı (1964)
- Büyük Yolculuk (1969)
- Buhûrumeryem (1971)
- Köpek İstasyonu (1988)
- Gece Lambalarının Işığında (collective storys, YKY, 2009)

=== Novels ===
- Demir Köprü (1998),
- Sırrımsın Sırdaşımsın (YKY 2010).

=== Other ===
- Çağdaş Alman Hikâyesi (1962)
