= Ivana Dobrakovová =

Slovak writer and translator

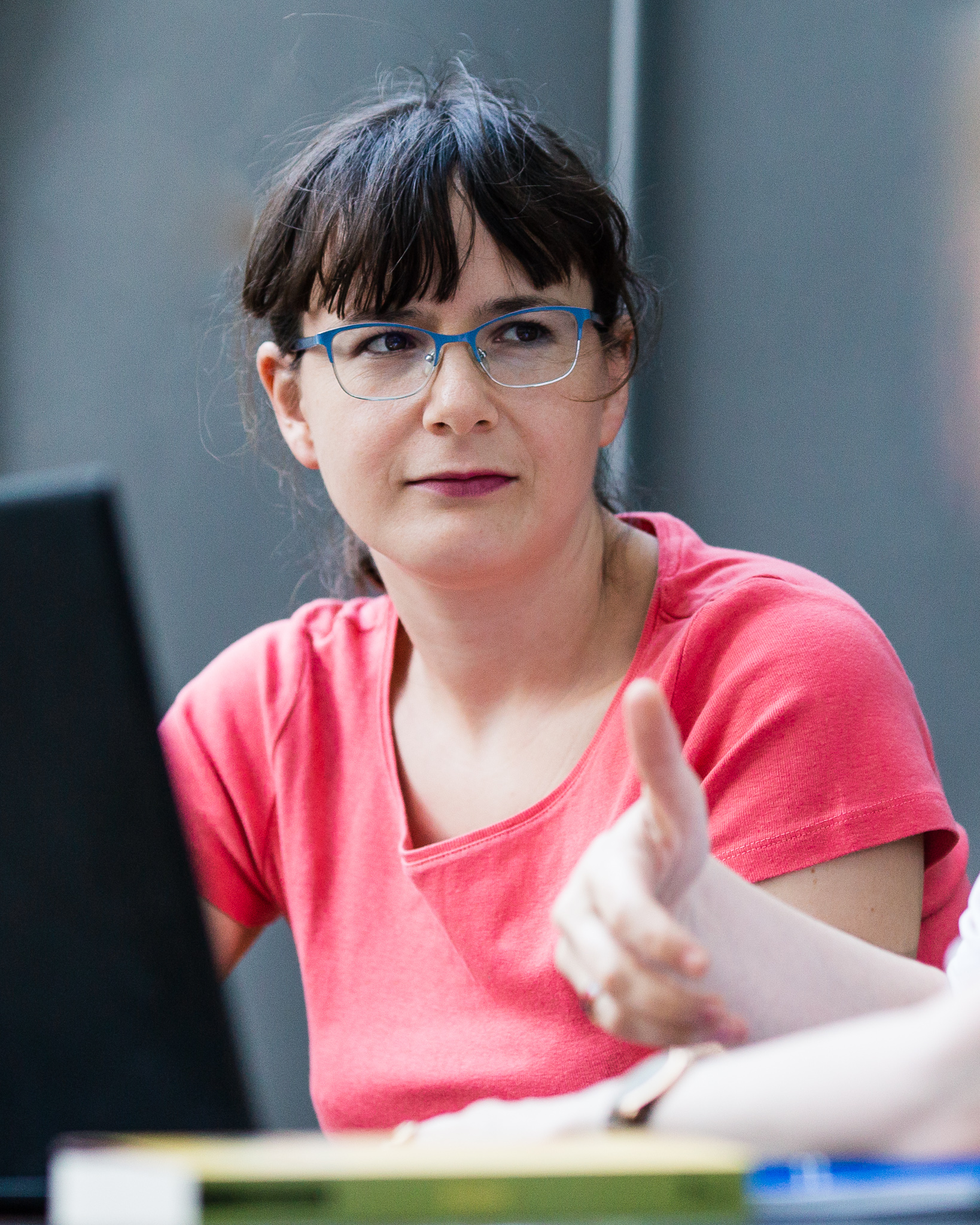
- Born: 1982 (age 43–44); Bratislava, Slovakia
- Education: Comenius University
- Occupations: Writer, translator
- Writing career
- Language: Slovak
- Notable works: Prvá smrť v rodine Bellevue; Toxo; Matky a kamionisti
- Notable awards: EU Prize for Literature (2019)

Ivana Dobrakovová (born 1982) is a Slovak writer and translator. She was born in Bratislava and studied English and French translation and interpretation at Comenius University. Her first short story collection titled Prvá smrť v rodine appeared in 2009, followed by her debut novel Bellevue (2010). Her second collection of short stories titled Toxo appeared in 2013, followed by her fourth book Matky a kamionisti (2018). All four books were shortlisted for the Anasoft Litera Prize, and Matky a kamionisti also won the EU Prize for Literature.

Dobrakovová lives in Turin where she is working on translating the Neapolitan novels of Elena Ferrante.
