= Khadija Marouazi =

Moroccan human rights activist and writer (born 1961)

- خديجة مروازي
- Born: 1961 (age 64–65); Marrakesh, Morocco
- Occupations: Human rights activist, writer, university lecturer
- Employer(s): Ibn Tofail University, Kenitra
- Organization(s): Mediator for the Study of Democracy and Human Rights, Morocco
- Notable work: History of Ash (novel)

Khadija Marouazi (Arabic: خديجة مروازي; born 1961) is a Moroccan human rights activist, writer and university lecturer for literature. Member of several human rights organizations in Morocco, she is also known for her debut novel History of Ash, originally written in Arabic and published in English translation in 2023. This fictional account of political repression during the so-called Years of Lead in Morocco and the traumatic effects on prisoners has been discussed by literary scholars as part of Arab women writers' prison literature.

== Life and career ==
Marouazi was born in Marrakesh, Morocco, in 1961 and lives in the Moroccan capital Rabat. She is one of the founders of the Moroccan Organization for Human Rights (OMDH) and the general secretary of the non-governmental organization Mediator for the Study of Democracy and Human Rights (al-wasit min ajl al-dimuqratiya). She is also a member of the scientific committee for the Moroccan magazines Dafatir al-sijjin (Prison Notebooks) and Majallat dirasat huquq al-insan (Journal for Human Rights Studies). Further, Marouazi teaches literature in the Department of Liberal Arts and Human Sciences at Ibn Tofail University in Kenitra.

In 2000, her debut novel History of Ash (original title: سيرة الرماد, Sīrat al-ramād) was published by Afrique Orient publishers in Casablanca. It is Marouazi's fictional account of the so-called Years of Lead, a period of political repression in Morocco during the 1960s and up to the 1980s. The story is told by the main characters, Mouline and Leila, who both have been imprisoned and tortured for their political activities, and tells how they are trying to come to terms with these events after their release. The narration changes between fictional past and present, between events that happened to Mouline and Leila inside the prison and outside, presenting descriptions of torture and the accusations by the judicial system. Further, the publishers wrote: "Mouline and Leila describe their strategies for survival and resistance in lucid, often searing detail, and reassess their political engagements and the movements in which they are involved."

== Reception ==
History of Ash was translated into English by Alexander E. Elinson, associate professor of Arabic and head of the Arabic program at Hunter College of the City University of New York. An excerpt of this translation was included in the 2010 anthology African women writing resistance: an anthology of contemporary voices. In his 2009 article for the journal Middle Eastern Literatures, Elinson discussed Marouazi's and Abdellatif Laâbi's storytelling techniques in his novel Le chemin des ordalies (Path of Ordeals), calling their works a literary contribution "to a multi-voiced narrative of reconciliation with the past, [...] suggesting ways of moving forward."

Upon its publication in English in 2023, History of Ash was shortlisted for the 2024 EBRD Literature Prize. This prize is awarded annually to distinguish the "literary richness" of its operational regions, which includes some 40 countries across Europe, Asia and Africa. The prize is shared by the writer and the translator, and funding for the prize worth €20,000 is provided by the member nations of the European Bank of Reconstruction and Development, in cooperation with the British Council.

Marouazi's novel was also selected as one of the 10 best books by Arab authors of 2023 by The New Arab media outlet, writing that the novel "vividly echoes the reality of this period." Further, History of Ash was selected by Brittle paper literary magazine as one of the 100 Notable African Books of 2023.

== Other Moroccan works of Prison Literature ==
Further Moroccan works of fiction and non-fiction about the Years of Lead and the secret Tazmamart prison are Fatna El Bouih’s Talk of Darkness, Malika Oufkir and Michèle Fitoussi’s Stolen Lives: Twenty Years in a Desert Jail, Mohamed Raiss’s From Skhirat to Tazmamart: A Roundtrip Ticket to Hell, Ahmed Marzouki’s Tazmamart: Cell Number 10 and Aziz Binebine’s Tazmamart – Eighteen Years in Morocco’s Secret Prison.

This period of the rule of King Hassan II of Morocco, from roughly the 1960s up to the 1980s, was marked by state violence and repression against political dissidents and democracy activists. History of Ash and other works about prisoners in North Africa, including Nawal El Saadawi’s Memoirs from the Women’s Prison and Salwa Bakr's The Golden Chariot, have been discussed by literary scholars as examples of Arab women writers' prison literature.

== Selected publications ==
=== Fiction ===
- History of Ash. Translated by Elinson, Alexander. Hoopoe Edition. 2023. ISBN 978-1-64903-281-2.

=== Non-fiction ===
- 20-Février, tentative de documentation. 2015. (About the protest movement in Morocco following the 20th February 2011, in French).
- with Médiateur pour la Démocratie et les Droits de l’Homme. 2009. Evaluation Du Rapport De “l’instance Equité Et Réconciliation” : Un Bilan Pour L’avenir. (Evaluation of the report about the Equity and Reconciliation Commission, in French)
- "Droits Humains: Black-Out À Tindouf". 2015. In Zamane: Le Maroc D’hier Et D’aujourd’hui. no. 53, pp. 56-57. (Article about human rights of Sahraoui refugees in Tindouf, Algeria, in French)

== See also ==
- Moroccan literature - 20th century
