= Burhan Sönmez =

Kurdish human rights lawyer and novelist (born 1965)

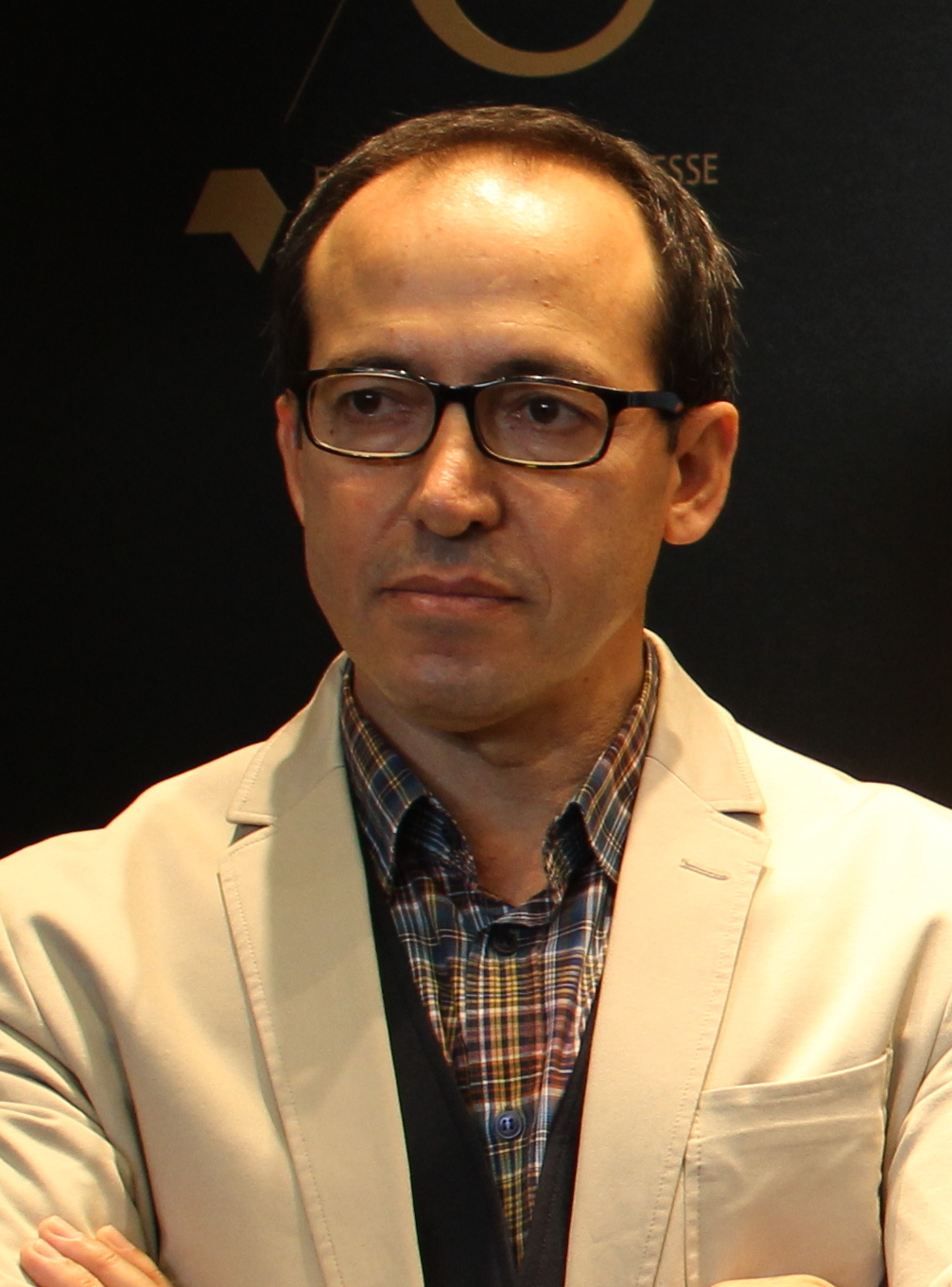
- Sönmez in 2017
- Born: 1965 (age 60–61); Haymana, Ankara, Turkey
- Occupation: Author
- Organizations: Hughes Hall College, University of Cambridge
- Known for: Hemingway Award Vaclav Havel Center Award EBRD Literature Prize
- Notable work: Istanbul Istanbul (2015); Lovers of Franz K. (2024); Red Mirror (2026)

President of PEN International
- Incumbent
- Assumed office October 2021
- Preceded by: Jennifer Clement
- Website: pen-international.org
- Website: burhansonmez.com

Burhan Sönmez is a Kurdish novelist from Turkey. He is the President of PEN International, elected at the Centennial Congress in 2021. He is Senior Member and a By-Fellow of Hughes Hall College, University of Cambridge.

Sönmez is the author of seven novels. He received Hemingway Award in Italy (2026) and Vaclav Havel Center award in New York (2017). He was awarded the EBRD Literature Prize in London (2018) for his novel Istanbul Istanbul. He received Jan Smrek Prize "for his prose writing" (2026). Sins and Innocents has received the Sedat Simavi Literature Prize, and Stone and Shadow received the Orhan Kemal Novel Award. Stone and Shadow was nominated for the Premio Strega Europeo (2023) and the Dublin Literary Award (2024). His novel Lovers of Franz K. was nominated for The Speakies - British Audio Awards (2025). His novels have been published in fifty three languages.

Sönmez was the inaugural lecturer of the Trinity Global Humanities Lecture Series (2024) at the University of Cambridge, where he presented the idea of "Homo Artifex", focusing on the meaning of art and its place in the history of human civilisation.

== Biography ==
Burhan Sönmez was born in Haymana, near Ankara, Turkey, in 1965. He grew up speaking Turkish and Kurdish, then later moved to Istanbul, where he worked for a time as a lawyer. He was a member of the Human Rights Society (IHD) and a founder of TAKSAV (Foundation for Social Research, Culture and Art). He was one of the founders of daily BirGün, a left-wing opposition newspaper.

Sönmez was arrested and detained by the Turkish authorities while a student in 1984, and again while working as a human rights lawyer. In 1996, he was seriously injured following a violent murder attempt by the Turkish police. Following the attack, he left Turkey, eventually ending up in Britain where he learnt English and received treatment with the support of the charity Freedom from Torture. He is now a dual Turkish-British national.

Even though he was interested in poetry and won awards in two national poetry competitions in Turkey, he turned his hand to writing novels. His interest in writing, storytelling and modern literature is rooted in the traditional stories and legends he was brought up with. His unique experience of growing up in a remote village with no electricity, and having a talented storyteller for a mother, has provided perspective, inspiration and material for his writing.

He has written for various newspapers and magazines including The Guardian, Der Spiegel, Die Zeit, La Repubblica. He translated the poetry book of The Marriage of Heaven and Hell by William Blake into Turkish. Sönmez was a member of the judging panel for the 2014 Cevdet Kudret Literature Prize, 2020 Geneva International Film Festival and the 2023 Inge Feltrinelli Prize. He lectured in Literature and the Novel at the Middle East Technical University (METU).

Sönmez lives between Cambridge and Istanbul.

== Literary career ==
Sönmez is the author of seven novels: North (Kuzey), published in 2009 in Turkey, Sins and Innocents (Masumlar), published in 2011, Istanbul Istanbul, published in 2015, Labyrinth, published in 2018, Stone and Shadow, published in 2021, Lovers of Franz K., published in 2024, and Red Mirror, published in 2026. He wrote the first five in Turkish, then he started to write in his mother tongue, Kurdish.

=== North (Kuzey) ===
Burhan Sönmez's first novel, North, is the story of a young man whose father leaves when the protagonist is two years old, and returns twenty years later as a corpse. In trying to solve the mystery of his father's death, our hero embarks on a journey to the North in search of his father's identity, which at times becomes his own. Eastern folk tales and legends have been woven into the story, which questions and reflects the nature of identity, reality and existence.

North could be described as a philosophical fairy tale. It tells the myths and legends of the East in a realistic fashion, and is based around philosophical debates on existence and love that have a central importance in solving the mystery.

=== Sins and Innocents (Masumlar) ===
The second novel by Sönmez, Sins and Innocents, was published in 2011 and received the Sedat Simavi Literature Prize, a prominent literature award in Turkey. The novel tells a story of two people whose paths come across on a foreign land. A woman carries a "book" and believes in poetry. A man, suffering from insomnia, struggles to survive through graves. Each of them has got a secret and a sin. On the day they meet the woman reads his fortune in the "book" and he sings the songs of desert. Sins and Innocents tells the story of two people whose lives have been running through Haymana Plain, Tehran and Cambridge.

=== Istanbul Istanbul ===
Sönmez's third novel, Istanbul Istanbul, was published in 2015 and is the story of four prisoners in the underground cells in Istanbul. When they are not being subjected to torture, the four tell one another stories about Istanbul to pass the time. The underground narrative gradually turns into the narrative of the above ground. Initially centered around persons, the novel comes to focus on the city of Istanbul. There is as much suffering or hope in the Istanbul above ground as there is in the cells underground.

Like the tales in The Decameron, the novel has 10 chapters. Each chapter is narrated by one of the occupants of the cell. "Istanbul was a city of a million cells and every cell was an Istanbul unto itself.” In every piece, person and event, the novel evokes Istanbul as a city in its entirety. It is a novel that appears political but is in reality about love. It appears to focus on the stories of individuals but is in reality about the city of Istanbul. Rather than being about capital production, the focus is on the city's spatial and spiritual reproduction. In modes of thought suggested by Althusser and Manuel Castells, the city of Istanbul is the site of reproduction for pain, misery, melancholy and hope. There are two Istanbuls, one below ground and one above. Yet in reality both are one and the same.

=== Labyrinth ===
Labyrinth was published in 2018. It is the story of Boratin, a blues singer, who attempts suicide by jumping off the Bosphorus Bridge in Istanbul, but opens his eyes in hospital. He loses his memory and cannot remember why he wished to end his life. He remembers only things that are unrelated to himself, but confuses their time. When he sees the figurine of Jesus and the Virgin Mary he recognises them but he cannot work out whether they lived thousands of years ago or just few years ago. He knows the Ottoman Empire fell, and that the last sultan died, but has no idea when. From the confusion of his social and individual memory, he is faced with two questions. The first is related to the body. Does physical recognition provide a sense of identity? The second concerns the mind. Which is more liberating for a man, or a society: knowing the past, or forgetting it? Labyrinth, embroidered with Borgesian micro-stories, flows smoothly on the surface while traversing sharp bends beneath the current.

=== Stone and Shadow ===
Stone and Shadow, published in 2021, received the Orhan Kemal Novel Award in 2022. It was shortlisted for the Premio Strega Europeo in 2023, and is currently on the longlist of the Dublin Literary Award (2024). It is the story of Avdo, a tombstone craftsman, whose life tells the social history of modern Turkey. His life journey gets involved with many other lives that reflects different cultural backgrounds including Christians, Sunni Muslims, Alawites, Turks, Kurds, Armenians. Avdo's story starts in the city of Mardin as an orphan. He is being protected by an Assyrian man who teaches him the art of sculpting tombstones. He travels from city to city and comes across Elif, the only love of his life, in a small Anatolian village. Avdo's dreams get shattered there when he has to kill two village men.

The story opens in the 1980s, during the times of military coup, in Istanbul. The story-line constantly shifts between the past and future. Alongside the contemporary period, the story of different times like Ottoman era, and of different places in the Middle East and Europe eventually creates an encompassing historical map of many different societies. By moving from one scene to another, the story collects all fragments one by one to form a whole picture in the end.

=== Lovers of Franz K. ===
Lovers of Franz K. (2024) is the first novel written by Sönmez in his mother tongue Kurdish, after writing five novels in Turkish. Kurdish is a language that has been suppressed and despised as a "mountain language" for a hundred years in the region.

Lovers of Franz K. is a thriller of love and literary revenge in the map of Paris-Istanbul-West Berlin and Tel Aviv, set in the midst of the Cold War in 1968. While the youth uprising sweeps across Europe, a debate about Franz Kafka appears in student magazines in Paris. There is a secret group that punishes ex-Nazi criminals, and they begin to argue that they should also protect the dead writers and act for their spirit. Lovers of Franz K. is a story of love and a creative obituary for Kafka.

The English language unabridged audiobook has been shortlisted in the Crime & Thriller category at the British Audio Awards.

=== Red Mirror ===
Red Mirror (2026) is the story of a woman, named Zaza, whose son went missing ten years ago after he had witnessed the assassination of a journalist. Zaza, who works at the Central Library in Istanbul as an expert in Ancient Greek Literature, searches for her son ceaselessly, but finds no clue.

While Zaza lies on her deathbed in the hospital, her son suddenly appears. As the story flows backward through different dimensions emerging in the mirrors, Zaza cannot be certain whether the person beside her is truly her son or the Angel of Death come for her final journey.

Zaza, a child of a family who were believed to be Christian and killed during the Dersim Massacre, was brought to Istanbul as a baby by a priest and left at the Greek Orphanage on Büyükada Island, Istanbul. Because her real name was unknown, she was given the name of the region/people she came from. The story recounts Zaza's life, beginning in the orphanage and extending to its closure in 1964 (due to the crisis in Cyprus), her secret love affair, and the child born from this relationship. The story touches upon Turkey’s political climate (as of the mid-20th century), different aspects of Istanbul, and a woman's struggle for existence in this city.

== Reviews ==
"The book, Labyrinth, reads like a fever dream. Boratin is a listless existential hero who often drifts through his days with an alienation befitting a Camus protagonist." Sarah Lyall, The New York Times).

"One of the most exciting, innovative voices." Harvard Review.

“His novels are steeped in imprisonment and memory, with echoes of Fyodor Dostoyevsky and George Louis Borges.” Jason Farago, The New York Times.

“There’s a Kafkaesque quality to the interrogation – ‘It is our job to assume the opposite of what you tell us,’ the police say – but Kurdish author Sönmez is really interested in the question of who owns literature. ... The dialogue-led approach makes the book punchy and fast-moving, and brings some surprising twists before the end.” John Self, The Guardian.

“Fact and fiction merge in Burhan Sönmez’s novel about a man out to avenge the wrong done to Kafka … The ‘Kafkaesque’ here is not the critique of an overbearing bureaucracy but Kafka’s often-elided farce and romance; there are even echoes of Kafka’s love letters ... Sönmez playfully expands Kafka’s world in a literary experiment that encourages readers to reimagine the unfinished work of their heroes.” Natalie Perman, Financial Times

“With echoes of Borges and Dostoevsky, Lovers of Franz K is more than a literary psychological thriller - it is a creative resurrection; a metafictional kaleidoscope where Poe meets Kafka whose bureaucracy is refracted through a Cold War lens. Literary rebel Sönmez does not just pay homage to Kafka - he enacts it.” Georgia de Chamberet, BookBlast

“Mr. Sönmez avoids easy judgments, preferring instead to steep his tale in broader quandaries: Is literature a cultural inheritance that we can legitimately claim against the wishes of its creator? ... Still, the novella’s intellectual ambition never eclipses its narrative allure. Mr. Sönmez’s prose, gracefully spare in Mr. Hêzil’s translation, evocatively channels Kafka himself, who hovers ghostlike over a trial in which Brod’s betrayal, Kaplan’s obsession and even readers’ own engagement with Kafka become part of the same continuum: a series of transgressions against Kafka’s writings." Benjamin Balint, The Wall Street Journal

“Burhan Sonmez’s unashamedly stagey thriller is a homage to Franz Kafka, framed as the trial (of course) of Ferdy Kaplan. … Sonmez, a Kurdish novelist who is president of PEN, which campaigns for freedom of expression, queries how far one should go in the pursuit of what is important to us.” James Owen, The Times

"Stone and Shadow has already taken place in the history of the novel as an important work. Burhan Sönmez creates his own original canon with his epic-modern narrative works. He is moving towards being the same for Turkey as Gabriel Garcia Marquez is for Colombia, Naguip Mahfouz for Egypt, Carlos Fuentes is for Mexico, Mo Yan is for China." T24 news.

"Labyrinth, like many fictional works written in reaction to political oppression, is an allegory that explores the fractured nature of the individual in a society suspended between a rich, complicated past and an uncertain future." Washington Independent Review of Books

"Sonmez’s words are conquering the whole world." ADNKronos (Italy)

"Yes, our country is turning into hell and it is getting more and more difficult to find any light here. That's why you should leave this novel in the public places, forget it in the cafes, read it out loud on the ferries. Let everyone hear Burhan Sönmez’s voice, and get everyone to resist pain and sorrow." Ümran Küçükislamoğlu, T24 News (Turkey)

"Burhan Sonmez opens the door of wounded memory of Kurds. He doesn't have a proclivity for questions of 'Who am I?' or 'What am I?' He asks: Where am I?" Dervis Aydin Akkoc, Ozgur Gundem (Turkey)
