= Rosie Goldsmith =

English journalist

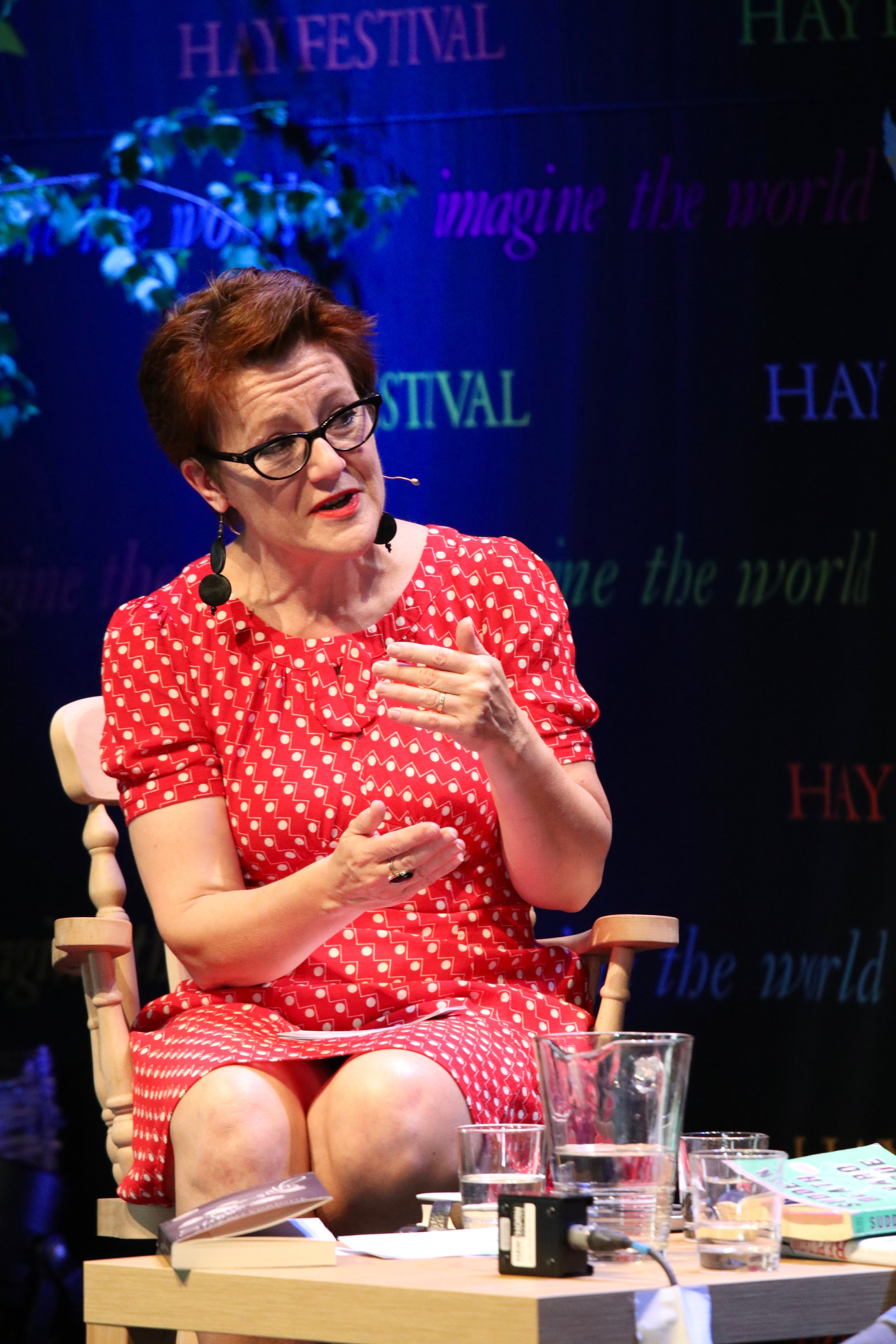
- Born: Newquay, Cornwall, England
- Education: University of Nottingham
- Occupation: Journalist
- Known for: Director of the European Literature Network and Editor-in-Chief of The Riveter magazine
- Notable credit(s): Front Row; Crossing Continents

Rosie Goldsmith is an English journalist specializing in arts and current affairs in the UK and abroad. In 20 years at the BBC, she travelled and presented the BBC programmes Front Row and Crossing Continents, among others. Countries she has lived in include Germany, France, South Africa and the United States.

She is multilingual and runs events and festivals and works with cultural organizations. She is director of the European Literature Network and founder of The Riveter magazine of European literature in English.

== Background ==
Born in Cornwall, England, she was six weeks old when her family moved to southern Africa (describing her father, she has said: "By nature, he was an adventurer; by profession, he was a teacher"), living for three years in what was then Rhodesia, and then two years in South Africa. When she was 10, they moved to the United States, where Goldsmith went to school in Manhattan. She attended the University of Nottingham, where she read French and German, and she subsequently went to Germany and spent seven years working as a freelance reporter for the BBC and Deutsche Welle.

At the fall of the Berlin Wall, she was in the launch team of BBC Radio 4's Eurofile, the UK's first weekly programme about Europe, on which she worked from 1989 to 1996, visiting Yugoslavia, Poland, Hungary, Bulgaria, Albania, Czechoslovakia as well as Germany, going on to become the series producer of Asiafile in 1997. She continued to travel the world as a presenter of BBC programmes including Crossing Continents and A World in Your Ears, and arts programmes as Front Row and Open Book.

She is director of the European Literature Network (ELNet), founded in 2010, and editor-in-chief of The Riveter magazine.
