= Ferit Edgü =

Turkish writer (1936-2024)

Ferit Edgü (1936-2024) was a Turkish writer of contemporary fiction. Edgü was known for his short stories, poems, novels, screenplays, and essays.

Born in Istanbul, Edgü served as a teacher in eastern Turkey in the 1960s. These experiences influenced his later work, such as The Wounded Age and Eastern Tales. His writing often shed light on the long history of state violence in Eastern Turkey, particularly against Turkey's Kurdish population.

His novel A Season in Hakkari was made into a film; the Turkish-German production won the Silver Bear at the 33rd Berlin Film Festival, but was banned in Turkey. Edgü was also awarded the Sait Faik Literature Prize for his story Bir Gemide (A Ship).
