= Krisztina Tóth (writer) =

Hungarian writer, poet and translator (born 1967)

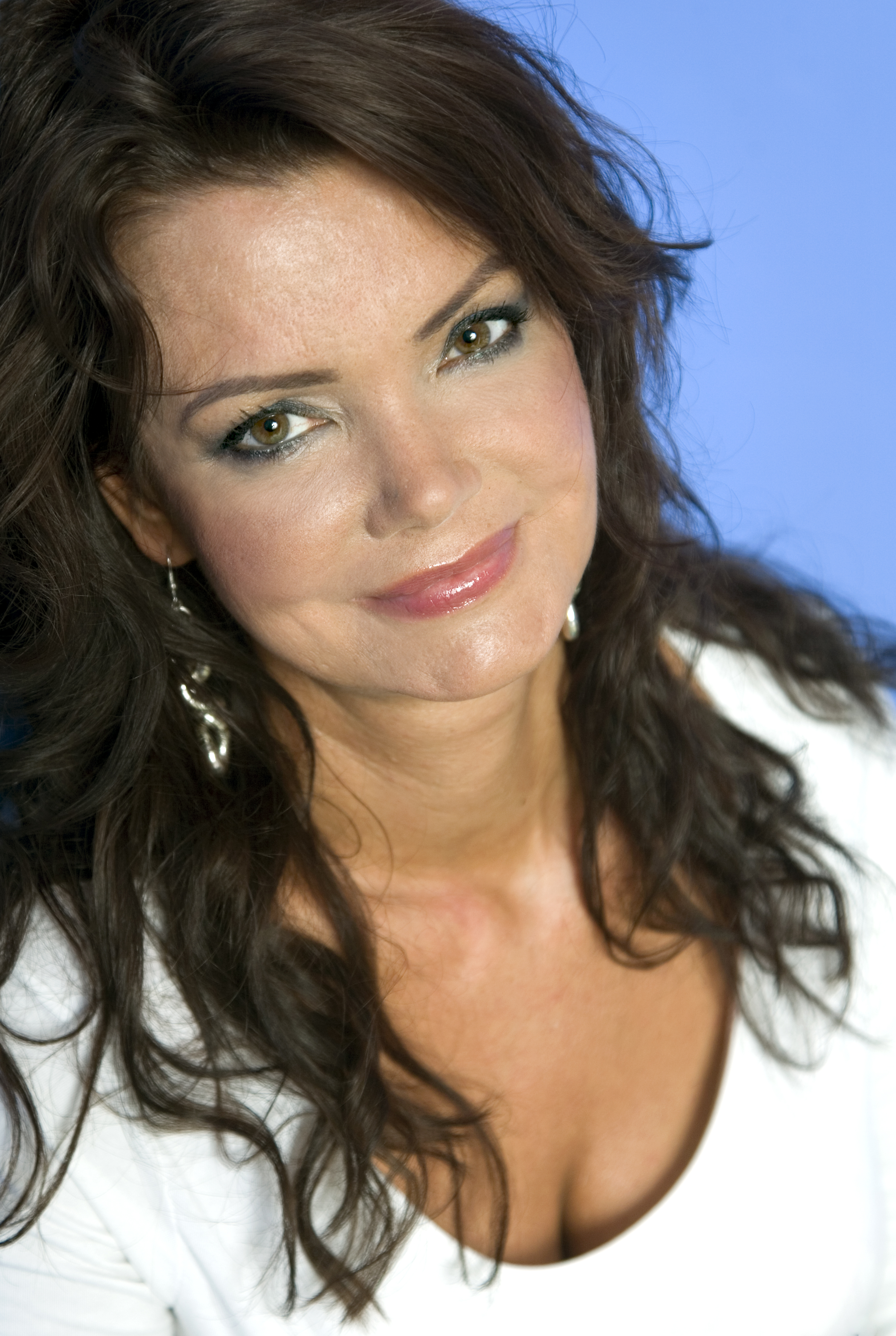
- Born: 5 December 1967 (age 58); Budapest, Hungary
- Occupations: writer and translator
- Writing career
- Notable work: Eye of the Monkey
- Notable awards: Attila József Prize (2000)
- Website: tothkrisztina.hu

Krisztina Tóth (born 5 December 1967 in Budapest) is a Hungarian writer, poet and translator.

== Life ==
She studied in Budapest, and Paris. She left Hungary because of political persecution. She appeared at the 2024 Head Read Literary Festival. She is currently resides in Switzerland as of February 2025.

== Selected works ==
Short stories, volumes of short stories, tales

- Vonalkód: tizenöt történet. Budapest: Magvető Kiadó, 2006
- Pixel. Budapest: Magvető Kiadó, 2011
- Akvárium. Budapest: Magvető Kiadó, 2013
- Pillanatragasztó Budapest: Magvető Kiadó 2014
- Párducpompa Budapest: Magvető Kiadó 2017
- Fehér farkas Budapest: Magvető Kiadó 2019

Volumes of poetry

- Őszi kabátlobogás 1989
- Az árnyékember 1997
- Porhó 2001
- Magas labda 2009
- Felhőmesék 2017

Novels

- Eye of the Monkey, translated from Hungarian by Ottilie Mulzet (Seven Stories Press, 2025)

== Awards ==
- Radnóti Prize (1990)
- Gyula Illyés Prize (1994)
- Tibor Déry Prize (1996)
- Attila József Prize (2000)
- István Vas Prize (2001)
- Szépíró Prize (2005)
- Sándor Márai Prize (2007)
- Bárka Prize (2010)
- Alföld Prize (2014)
