= Franz Kafka bibliography =

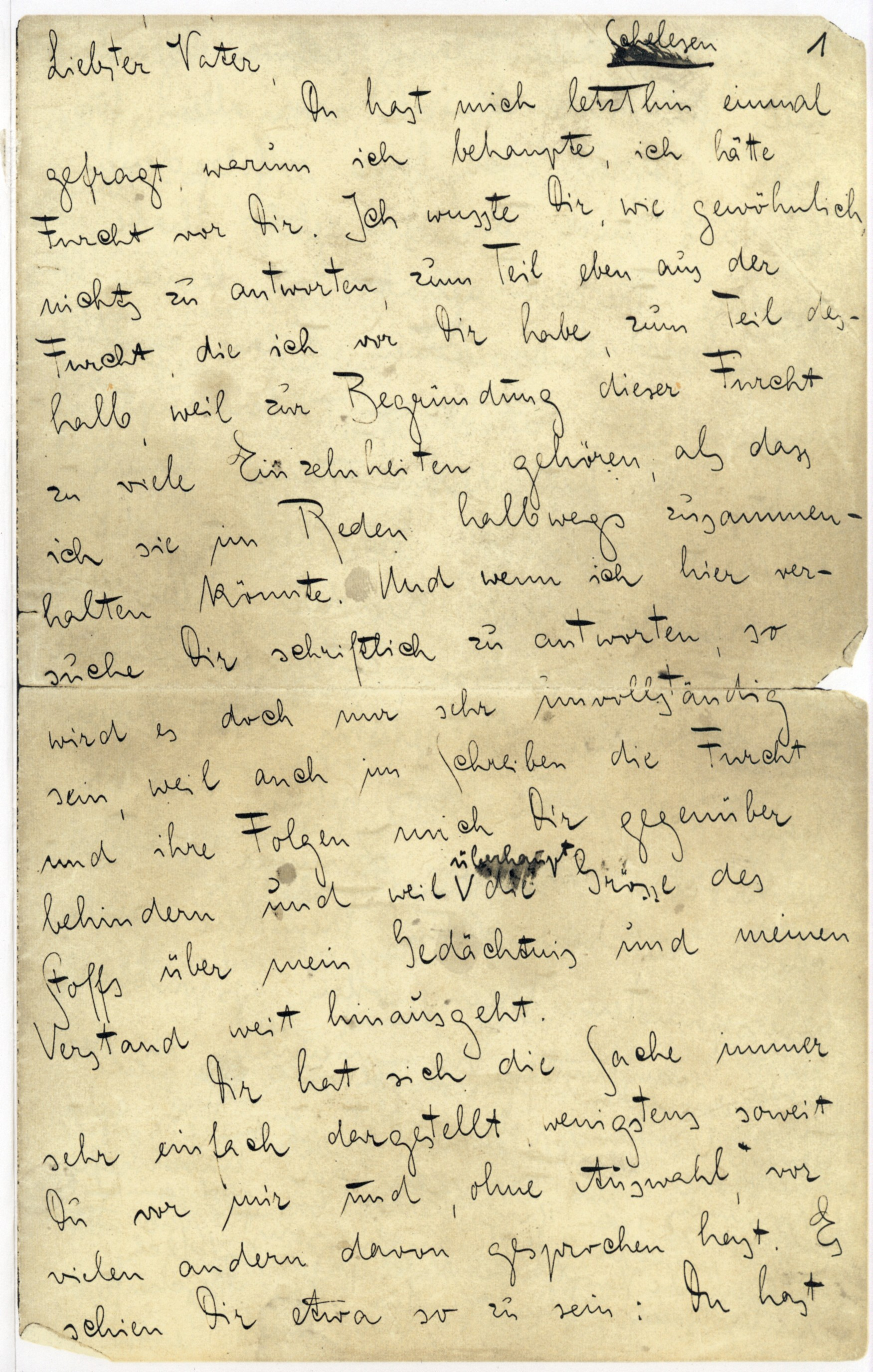
First page of Kafka's letter to his father

Franz Kafka, a German-language writer of novels and short stories who is regarded by critics as one of the most influential authors of the 20th century, was trained as a lawyer and later employed by an insurance company, writing only in his spare time.

== Fiction ==
=== Novels ===
English title	Date of Writing	Original German title	English translations	Notes	Cover first edition
Amerika or The Man Who Disappeared; Amerika: The Missing Person	1911–1914	Amerika or Der Verschollene (1927)	Willa and Edwin Muir (1938); Michael Hofmann (1997); Mark Harman (2008)	Includes the short story "The Stoker" as first chapter	
The Trial	1914–1915	Der Prozess (1925)	Willa and Edwin Muir (1935); Idris Parry (1994); Breon Mitchell (1999); David Wyllie (2003); Richard Stokes (2005); John Williams; (2008); Mike Mitchell (2009)	Includes the parable "Before the Law"	
The Castle	1922	Das Schloss (1926)	Willa and Edwin Muir (1930); Mark Harman (1998); J. A. Underwood (2000); Anthea Bell (2009)	published in two versions: Max Brod's 1926 edition and a "definitive edition" in 1951	

=== Short stories ===
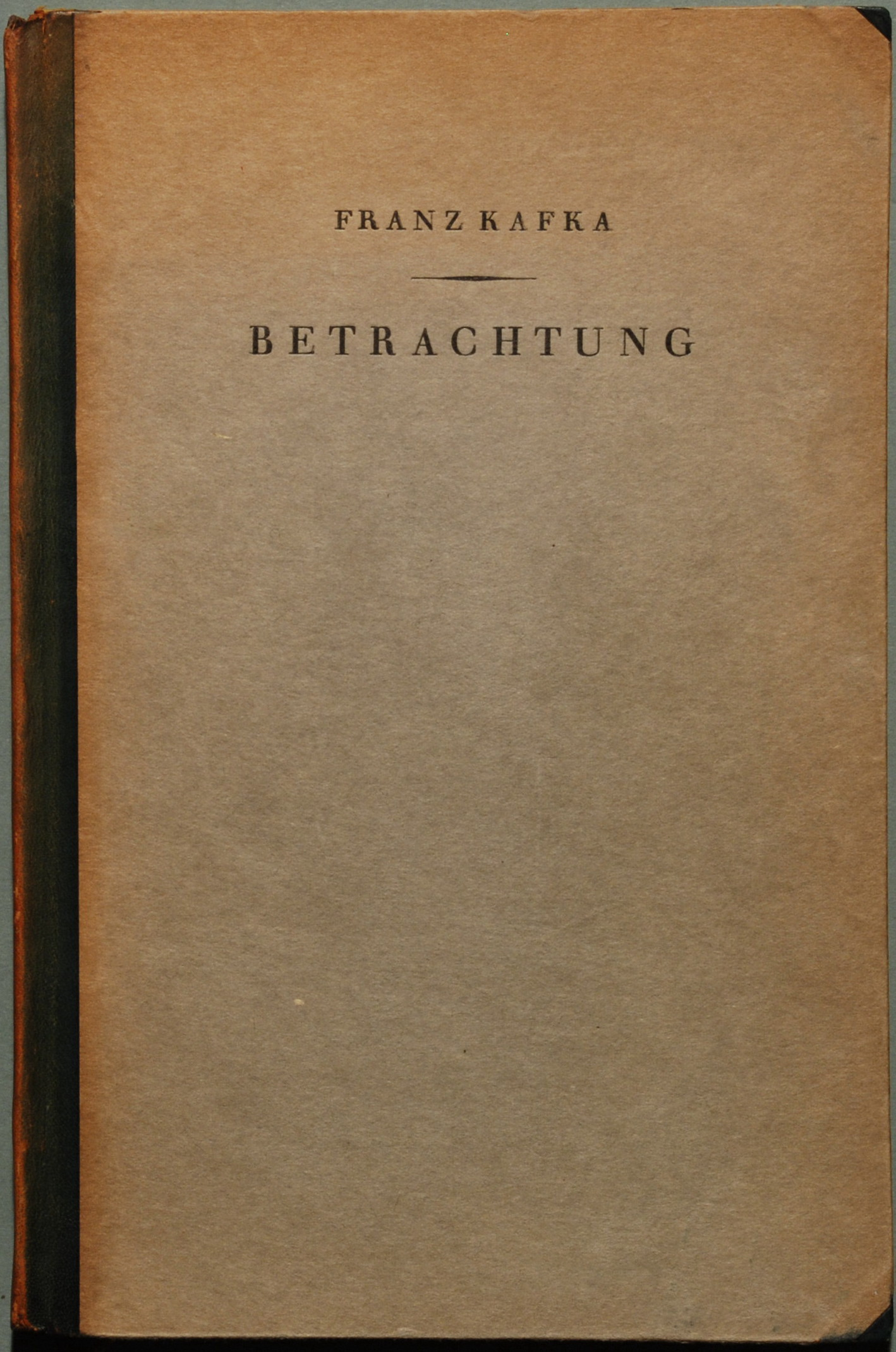
First Edition of Betrachtung (Contemplation) (1912)

Contemplation (Betrachtung) (1912), included in The Complete Stories and The Penal Colony: Stories and Short Pieces
English title	German title
"Children on a Country Road"	"Kinder auf der Landstraße"
"The Trees"	"Die Bäume"
"Clothes"	"Kleider"
"Excursion into the Mountains"	"Der Ausflug ins Gebirge"
"Rejection"	"Die Abweisung"
"The Street Window"	"Das Gassenfenster"
"The Tradesman"	"Der Kaufmann"
"Absent-minded Window-gazing"	"Zerstreutes Hinausschaun"
"The Way Home"	"Der Nachhauseweg"
"Passers-by"	"Die Vorüberlaufenden"
"On the Tram"	"Der Fahrgast"
"Reflections for Gentlemen-Jockeys"	"Zum Nachdenken für Herrenreiter"
"The Wish to be a Red Indian"	"Wunsch, Indianer zu werden"
"Unhappiness"	"Unglücklichsein"
"Bachelor's Ill Luck"	"Das Unglück des Junggesellen"
"Unmasking a Confidence Trickster"	"Entlarvung eines Bauernfängers"
"The Sudden Walk"	"Der plötzliche Spaziergang"
"Resolutions"	"Entschlüsse"

"A Country Doctor" ("Ein Landarzt") (1919), included in The Complete Stories
English title	German title
"The New Advocate"	"Der neue Advokat"
"A Country Doctor"	"Ein Landarzt" (1919)
"Up in the Gallery"	"Auf der Galerie"
"An Old Manuscript"	"Ein altes Blatt"
"Before the Law"	"Vor dem Gesetz" (part of "The Trial")
"Jackals and Arabs"	"Schakale und Araber"
"A Visit to a Mine"	"Ein Besuch im Bergwerk"
"The Next Village"	"Das nächste Dorf"
"A Message from the Emperor"	"Eine kaiserliche Botschaft" (part of "The Great Wall of China")
"The Cares of a Family Man"	"Die Sorge des Hausvaters"
"Eleven Sons"	"Elf Söhne"
"A Fratricide"	"Der Mord / Ein Brudermord"
"A Dream"	"Ein Traum"
"A Report to an Academy"	"Ein Bericht für eine Akademie"

Shorter stories and parables
English title	Original German title	Collected in:
"Shamefaced Lanky and Impure in Heart"	"Der Unredliche in seinem Herzen" (1958, written 1902)	Letters to Friends, Family, and Editors
"Description of a Struggle" includes two dialogues originally published separately: "Conversation with the Supplicant" "Conversation with the Drunk"	"Beschreibung eines Kampfes" (1909) "Gespräch mit dem Beter" "Gespräch mit dem Betrunkenen"	Description of a Struggle, The Complete Stories; Both dialogues originally published in Hyperion (Munich, 1909); a different version of "Conversation with the Supplicant" appears in The Penal Colony: Stories and Short Pieces
"Wedding Preparations in the Country"	"Hochzeitsvorbereitungen auf dem Lande" (1954, written 1907–1908)	The Complete Stories, Dearest Father. Stories and Other Writings
"The Judgment"	"Das Urteil" (1913)	The Complete Stories, The Sons, The Penal Colony: Stories and Short Pieces
The Metamorphosis or The Transformation	Die Verwandlung (1915)	The Complete Stories, The Sons, The Penal Colony: Stories and Short Pieces
"The Stoker"	"Der Heizer" (1913)	The Sons; first chapter of Amerika
"In the Penal Colony"	"In der Strafkolonie" (1919)	The Complete Stories, The Penal Colony: Stories and Short Pieces
"The Village Schoolmaster (The Giant Mole)"	"Der Dorfschullehrer" or Der Riesenmaulwurf (1931, written 1915)	The Complete Stories, The Great Wall of China
"Blumfeld, an Elderly Bachelor"	"Blumfeld, ein älterer Junggeselle" (1936, written 1913)	Description of a Struggle, The Complete Stories
The Warden of the Tomb (short play)	Der Gruftwächter (written 1916–17)	Description of a Struggle, The Complete Stories
"The Hunter Gracchus"	"Der Jäger Gracchus" (1931, written 1917)	The Complete Stories, Parables and Paradoxes, The Great Wall of China
"The Great Wall of China"	"Beim Bau der Chinesischen Mauer" (1931, written 1917)	The Complete Stories, The Great Wall of China
"The Refusal"	"Die Abweisung" (written 1920)	Description of a Struggle, The Complete Stories, Parables and Paradoxes
"A Hunger Artist"	"Ein Hungerkünstler" (1922)	The Complete Stories, The Penal Colony: Stories and Short Pieces
"Investigations of a Dog"	"Forschungen eines Hundes" (written 1922)	The Complete Stories, The Great Wall of China
"A Little Woman"	"Eine kleine Frau" (1924)	The Complete Stories, The Penal Colony: Stories and Short Pieces
"The Burrow"	"Der Bau" (1931)	The Complete Stories, The Great Wall of China
"Josephine the Singer, or The Mouse Folk"	"Josefine, die Sängerin oder Das Volk der Mäuse" (1924)	The Complete Stories, The Penal Colony: Stories and Short Pieces
"The Bridge"	"Die Brücke"	The Complete Stories, The Great Wall of China
"The Bucket Rider"	"Der Kübelreiter" (1921, written 1917)	The Complete Stories, The Penal Colony: Stories and Short Pieces, The Great Wall of China
"The Knock at the Manor Gate"	"Der Schlag ans Hoftor"	The Complete Stories, The Great Wall of China
"My Neighbor"	"Der Nachbar" (written 1917)	The Complete Stories, The Great Wall of China
"A Crossbreed"	"Eine Kreuzung"	The Complete Stories, The Great Wall of China
"A Common Confusion"	"Eine alltägliche Verwirrung"	The Complete Stories, The Great Wall of China
"The Truth about Sancho Panza"	"Die Wahrheit über Sancho Pansa"	The Complete Stories, Parables and Paradoxes, The Great Wall of China
"The Silence of the Sirens"	"Das Schweigen der Sirenen"	The Complete Stories, Parables and Paradoxes, The Great Wall of China
"Prometheus"	"Prometheus" (written 1917-23)	The Complete Stories, Parables and Paradoxes, The Great Wall of China
"The City Coat of Arms"	"Das Stadtwappen"	The Complete Stories, Parables and Paradoxes, The Great Wall of China
"Poseidon"	"Poseidon" (written 1920)	Description of a Struggle, The Complete Stories, Parables and Paradoxes
"Fellowship"	"Gemeinschaft"	Description of a Struggle, The Complete Stories
"At Night"	"Nachts"	Description of a Struggle, The Complete Stories
"The Problem of Our Laws"	"Zur Frage der Gesetze"	The Complete Stories, Parables and Paradoxes, The Great Wall of China
"The Conscription of Troops"	"Die Truppenaushebung"	Description of a Struggle, The Complete Stories
"The Test"	"Die Prüfung"	Description of a Struggle, The Complete Stories, Parables and Paradoxes
"The Vulture"	"Der Geier"	Description of a Struggle, The Complete Stories, Parables and Paradoxes
"The Helmsman"	"Der Steuermann"	Description of a Struggle, The Complete Stories
"The Top"	"Der Kreisel"	Description of a Struggle, The Complete Stories
"A Little Fable"	"Kleine Fabel"	The Complete Stories, The Great Wall of China
"Home-Coming"	"Heimkehr"	Description of a Struggle, The Complete Stories
"First Sorrow"	"Erstes Leid" (written 1921-22)	The Complete Stories, The Penal Colony: Stories and Short Pieces
"The Departure"	"Der Aufbruch" (written 1920-21)	Description of a Struggle, The Complete Stories
"Advocates"	"Fürsprecher" (written 1922)	Description of a Struggle, The Complete Stories
"The Married Couple"	"Das Ehepaar" (written 1922)	The Complete Stories, The Great Wall of China
"Give It Up!"	"Gibs auf!"	Description of a Struggle, The Complete Stories
"On Parables"	"Von den Gleichnissen"	The Complete Stories, Parables and Paradoxes, The Great Wall of China
"Peking and the Emperor"	"Der Kaiser von Peking"	Parables and Paradoxes
"The Great Wall and the Tower of Babel"	"Die Chinesische Mauer und der Turmbau von Babel"	Parables and Paradoxes
"Paradise"	"Das Paradies"	Parables and Paradoxes
"The Tower of Babel"	"Der Turm zu Babel"	Parables and Paradoxes
"The Pit of Babel"	"Der Schacht von Babel"	Parables and Paradoxes
"Abraham"	"Abraham"	Parables and Paradoxes
"Mount Sinai"	"Der Berg Sinai"	Parables and Paradoxes
"The Building of the Temple"	"Der Tempelbau"	Parables and Paradoxes
"The Animal in the Synagogue"	"Das Tier in der Synagoge"	Parables and Paradoxes
"The Watchman"	"Der Wächter"	Parables and Paradoxes
"The Coming of the Messiah"	"Das Kommen des Messias"	Parables and Paradoxes
"The Sirens"	"Die Sirenen"	Parables and Paradoxes
"Leopards in the Temple"	"Leoparden in Tempel"	Parables and Paradoxes
"Alexander the Great"	"Alexander der Grosse"	Parables and Paradoxes
"Diogenes"	"Diogenes"	Parables and Paradoxes
"The Building of a City"	"Der Bau einer Stadt"	Parables and Paradoxes
"The Imperial Colonel"	"Der Kaiserliche Oberst"	Parables and Paradoxes
"The Emperor"	"Der Kaiser"	Parables and Paradoxes
"In the Caravansary"	"In der Karawanserei"	Parables and Paradoxes
"The Cell"	"Die Zelle"	Parables and Paradoxes
"The Invention of the Devil"	"Die Erfindung des Teufels"	Parables and Paradoxes
"The Savages"	"Die Wilden"	Parables and Paradoxes
"The Green Dragon"	"Der Grüne Drache"	Parables and Paradoxes
"The Tiger"	"Der Tiger"	Parables and Paradoxes
"Couriers"	"Kuriere"	Parables and Paradoxes
"A Chinese Puzzle"	"Ein Geduldspiel"	Parables and Paradoxes
"Robinson Crusoe"	"Robinson Crusoe"	Parables and Paradoxes
"The Spring"	"Die Quelle"	Parables and Paradoxes
"The Hunger Strike"	"Die Unersättlichsten"	Parables and Paradoxes
"My Destination"	"Das Ziel"	Parables and Paradoxes

== Non-fiction ==
=== Diaries and notebooks ===
Title	Original German title	Translators	Notes
Diaries 1910–1923	Tagebücher 1910–1923	1910–1913 Joseph Kresh; 1914–1923 Martin Greenberg	Originally published in two volumes
The Diaries of Franz Kafka	Tagebücher 1910–1923	Ross Benjamin	Complete, uncensored, published by Schocken Books in 2023
The Blue Octavo Notebooks		Ernst Kaiser and Eithne Wilkins	included in Dearest Father. Stories and Other Writings

=== Letters ===
Kafka wrote hundreds of letters to family and close female friends, including his father, his fiancée Felice Bauer, and his youngest sister Ottla.

Title	Original German title	Translators	Notes
Letter to His Father	Brief an den Vater	Ernst Kaiser and Eithne Wilkins	Included in The Sons and Dearest Father. Stories and Other Writings
Dearest Father	Brief an den Vater	Hannah and Richard Stokes	Published in 2008 by Oneworld Classics Limited
Letters to Felice	Briefe an Felice und andere Korrespondenz aus der Verlobungszeit	James Stern and Elisabeth Duckworth	Includes Kafka's letters to Grete Bloch
Letters to Milena	Briefe an Milena	Philip Boehm	Includes Milena's letters to Max Brod, four essays by her and an obituary for Kafka
Letters to Ottla	Briefe an Ottla und die Familie	Richard and Clara Winston	Includes letters to Kafka's parents, sister Ottla, postcards and drawings
Letters to Friends, Family, and Editors	Briefe 1902–1924	Richard and Clara Winston	Includes a selection from the slips of paper Kafka used to communicate in the last few weeks of his life when he was advised not to speak

=== Essays ===
Title	Original German title	Notes	Included in:
The Aeroplanes At Brescia	Die Aeroplane in Brescia	Report on the air show at Brescia	The Penal Colony: Stories and Short Pieces
The First Long Train Journey	Die erste lange Eisenbahnfahrt	Written by Kafka and Max Brod	The Penal Colony: Stories and Short Pieces
Review of Hyperion	Eine entschlafene Zeitschrift	Review of the literary magazine	The Penal Colony: Stories and Short Pieces
Review of A Novel about Youth	Ein Roman der Jugend	Review of Felix Sternheim's; Die Geschichte des jungen Oswald	The Penal Colony: Stories and Short Pieces
On Kleist's "Anecdotes"	Über Kleist's Anekdoten	Review of a collection of Heinrich Kleist's anecdotes	The Penal Colony: Stories and Short Pieces

=== Work-related writings ===
Title	Year	Included in:
The Scope of Compulsory Insurance for the Building Trades	1908	Franz Kafka: The Office Writings
Speech on the Occasion of the Inauguration of the Institute's New Director	1909	Franz Kafka: The Office Writings
Fixed-Rate Insurance Premiums for Small Farms Using Machinery	1909	Franz Kafka: The Office Writings
Inclusion of Private Automobile "Firms" in the Compulsory Insurance Program	1909	Franz Kafka: The Office Writings
Appeal against Risk Classification of Christian Geipel & Sohn, Mechanical Weaving Mill in Asch	1910	Franz Kafka: The Office Writings
Measures for Preventing Accidents from Wood-Planing Machines	1910	Franz Kafka: The Office Writings
On the Examination of Firms by Trade Inspectors	1911	Franz Kafka: The Office Writings
Workmen's Insurance and Employers: Two Articles in the Tetschen Bodenbacher Zeitung	1911	Franz Kafka: The Office Writings
Petition of the Toy Producers' Association in Katharinaberg, Erzgebirge	1912	Franz Kafka: The Office Writings
Risk Classification Appeal by Norbert Hochsieder, Boarding House Owner in Marienbad	1912	Franz Kafka: The Office Writings
Letters to the Workmen's Accident; Insurance Institute in Prague	1912–15	Franz Kafka: The Office Writings
Criminal Charge against Josef Renelt for the Illegal Withholding of Insurance Fees	1913	Franz Kafka: The Office Writings
Second International Congress on Accident Prevention and First Aid in Vienna	1913	Franz Kafka: The Office Writings
Accident Prevention in Quarries	1914	Franz Kafka: The Office Writings
Jubilee Report: Twenty-Five Years of the Workmen's Accident Insurance Institute	1914	Franz Kafka: The Office Writings
Risk Classification and Accident; Prevention in Wartime	1915	Franz Kafka: The Office Writings
A Public Psychiatric Hospital for German-Bohemia	1916	Franz Kafka: The Office Writings
"Help Disabled Veterans! An Urgent; Appeal to the Public"	1916/1917	Franz Kafka: The Office Writings

== Editions and collections ==
=== Works and first publications in German ===
Only a few of Kafka's works were published during his lifetime: the story collections Betrachtung (Contemplation) and Ein Landarzt (A Country Doctor), and individual stories, such as Die Verwandlung (The Metamorphosis), in literary magazines. He prepared the story collection Ein Hungerkünstler (A Hunger Artist) for print, but it was not published until after his death. Kafka's unfinished works, including his novels Der Process, Das Schloss and Amerika (also known as Der Verschollene, The Man Who Disappeared), were published posthumously, mostly by his friend Max Brod, who ignored Kafka's wish to have the manuscripts destroyed. Brod also published letters, diaries and aphorisms.

Many of Kafka's works have uncertain dates of writing and/or were written over long periods of time. In such cases the year the writing of the work began is used. Year and place of the first publication is shown. For many works the German text is available, for several works also an English translation. It is linked in columns "de" (short for "deutsch", German) and "en" (short for English).

Standard English title	German title	Literal English title	de	en	Genre	Date of writing	Date of first publication	Place of publication	Cover	Remarks
Amerika or The Man Who Disappeared	Amerika or Der Verschollene	America	de		novel	1912	1927	Leipzig		title Amerika by Brod, contains "Der Heizer" ("The Stoker")
The Trial	Der Process		de		novel	1914	1925	Berlin		also spelled in German as Der Prozess and Der Prozeß
The Castle	Das Schloss	The Castle	de		novel	1922	1926	Leipzig		also spelled in German as Das Schloß
Contemplation also known as Meditation	Betrachtung		de		story collection	1904–1912	1912	Leipzig		some stories from 1908 in Hyperion
A Country Doctor	Ein Landarzt		de		story collection	1919	1919	Leipzig		
A Hunger Artist	Ein Hungerkünstler		de		story collection	1922	1924	Prague		
The Great Wall of China	Beim Bau der chinesischen Mauer		de		story collection	1918	1931	Berlin		
The Warden of the Tomb	Der Gruftwächter				play	1916–1917	1958	New York		in Description of a Struggle
"Description of a Struggle" including "Conversation with the Supplicant", "Conversation with the Drunk"	"Beschreibung eines Kampfes" including "Gespräch mit dem Beter", "Gespräch mit dem Betrunkenen"		Urteil, Beter, Betrunkener		story	1904	1909	Munich		dialogues first in Hyperion
"Wedding Preparations in the Country"	"Hochzeitsvorbereitungen auf dem Lande"		de		story	1907–1908	1954	London		an incomplete work intended to be a novel
"The Aeroplanes At Brescia"	"Die Aeroplane in Brescia"		de		story	1909	1909 September	Prague		first in Bohemia
The First Long Journey by Rail (Prague-Zurich)					story	1912	1912 May	in Herderblätter		first chapter of unfinished novel Richard und Samuel: Eine kleine Reise durch mitteleuropäische Gegenden
"The Judgment"	"Das Urteil"	The Verdict	de		story	1912 22–23 September	1913	Leipzig		in the literary yearbook Arkadia
"The Metamorphosis"	"Die Verwandlung"	The Transformation	de	en	story	1912	1915	Leipzig		in Die Weißen Blätter
"The Stoker"	"Der Heizer"		de		story	1913	1913 May	Leipzig		in Volume 3 of Kurt Wolff's Day of Judgment series.
"Before the Law"	"Vor dem Gesetz"		de	en	story	1914	1915	Prague		in the independent Jewish weekly Selbstwehr, in Ein Landarzt, in Der Process
"In the Penal Colony"	"In der Strafkolonie"		de	en	story	1914	1919	Leipzig		
"The Village Schoolmaster" ("The Giant Mole")	"Der Dorfschullehrer" or "Der Riesenmaulwurf"		de		story	1914–1915	1931	Berlin		in Beim Bau der Chinesischen Mauer
"Blumfeld, an Elderly Bachelor"	"Blumfeld, ein älterer Junggeselle"		de		story	1915	1958	New York		in Description of a Struggle
"The Hunter Gracchus"	"Der Jäger Gracchus"		de		story	1917	1931	Berlin		in Beim Bau der Chinesischen Mauer
"A Common Confusion"	"Eine alltägliche Verwirrung"		de		story	1917	1931	Berlin		in Beim Bau der Chinesischen Mauer
"The Bridge"	"Die Brücke"		de		story	1917	1931	Berlin		in Beim Bau der Chinesischen Mauer
"A Report to an Academy"	"Ein Bericht für eine Akademie"		de	en	story	1917	1917	Prague		in Der Jude
"Jackals and Arabs"	"Schakale und Araber"		de	en	story	1917	1917	Prague		in Der Jude
"A Crossbreed"	"Eine Kreuzung"		de		story	1917	1931	Berlin		in Beim Bau der Chinesischen Mauer
"The Knock at the Manor Gate"	"Der Schlag ans Hoftor"		de		story	1917	1931	Berlin		in Beim Bau der Chinesischen Mauer
"The Silence of the Sirens"	"Das Schweigen der Sirenen"		de		story	1917	1931	Berlin		in Beim Bau der Chinesischen Mauer
"The Truth about Sancho Panza"	"Die Wahrheit über Sancho Pansa"		de		story	1917	1931	Berlin		in Beim Bau der Chinesischen Mauer
"The Great Wall of China"	"Beim Bau der chinesischen Mauer"	At the building of the Chinese Wall	de	en	story	1918	1931	Berlin		in Beim Bau der Chinesischen Mauer
"Prometheus"	"Prometheus"		de		story	1918	1931	Berlin		in Beim Bau der Chinesischen Mauer
"A Country Doctor"	"Ein Landarzt"		de	en	story	1919	1919	Leipzig		in Ein Landarzt
"An Old Manuscript"	"Ein altes Blatt"	"An old page" or "An old leaf"	de		story	1919	1920	Leipzig		in Ein Landarzt
"The City Coat of Arms"	"Das Stadtwappen"		de		story	1920	1931	Berlin		in Beim Bau der Chinesischen Mauer
"The Problem of Our Laws"	"Zur Frage der Gesetze"		de		story	1920	1931	Berlin		in Beim Bau der Chinesischen Mauer
"On Parables"	"Von den Gleichnissen"		de		story		1931	Berlin		in Beim Bau der Chinesischen Mauer
"A Little Fable"	"Kleine Fabel"		de		story	1920	1931	Berlin		in Beim Bau der Chinesischen Mauer
"Poseidon"	"Poseidon"		de		story	1920	1936			in collection Beschreibung eines Kampfes
"The Refusal"	"Die Abweisung"	The Rejection			story	1920	1970	Frankfurt		title by Brod, same as a different earlier story by Kafka
"The Bucket Rider"	"Der Kübelreiter"		de (1921), de (1931)		story	1921	1921	Prag		in Prager Presse
"A Hunger Artist" ("A Fasting Artist", "A Starvation Artist")	"Ein Hungerkünstler"		de	en	story	1922	1922	Prague		in Die neue Rundschau, then in Ein Hungerkünstler
"First Sorrow"	"Erstes Leid"		de		story	1921–1922	1922	Leipzig		in periodical Genius, then in Ein Hungerkünstler
"Investigations of a Dog"	"Forschungen eines Hundes"		de		story	1923	1931	Berlin		in Beim Bau der Chinesischen Mauer
"A Little Woman"	"Eine kleine Frau"		de		story	1923–1924	1924	Prague		in Prager Tagblatt, then in Ein Hungerkünstler
"The Burrow"	"Der Bau"		de		story	1924	1931	Berlin		ending apparently lost; in Beim Bau der Chinesischen Mauer
"Josephine the Singer, or the Mouse Folk"	"Josefine, die Sängerin, oder Das Volk der Mäuse"		de		story	1923	1924	Prague		in Prager Presse, then in Ein Hungerkünstler
Franz Kafka's Diaries	Tagebücher				diary	1910–1923	1948	New York		
The Blue Octavo Notebooks	Oxforder Oktavhefte	Oxford Octavo Notebooks			notebook	1917–1919	1954	New York		also known as The Eight Octavo Notebooks
Letter to His Father	Brief an den Vater		de		letter	1919 November	1966	New York		
Letters to Felice	Briefe an Felice				letter collection	1912–1917	1967	Frankfurt am Main		
Letters to Ottla	Briefe an Ottla und die Familie	Letters to Ottla and to the family			letter collection	1909–1924	1974	Frankfurt am Main		includes some letters to his parents and other family members
Letters to Milena	Briefe an Milena				letter collection	1920–23	1952	Frankfurt am Main		
Letters to Family, Friends, and Editors	Briefe 1902–1924				letter collection	1900–24	1959	New York		most of the letters are to Brod
Zürau Aphorisms, The	Die Zürauer Aphorismen or Betrachtungen über Sünde, Hoffnung, Leid und den wahren Weg	Reflections on Sin, Hope, Suffering, and the True Way	de		aphorisms	1917–18	1931	Cologne		Title by Brod

=== English translations ===
German's more flexible word order is one of the problems translating German into other languages. German also uses modal connectives, and syntactic structures which can be translated in more than one way. Kafka did not write in standard High German, but rather in a Praguean German heavily influenced by the Yiddish and Czech languages. This has led philosophers Deleuze and Guattari to describe Kafka's linguistic style as "deterritorialized", characterized by a "withered vocabulary" and an "incorrect syntax".

German sentences also have a different syntactic structure. Unlike English, German is a verb-final language, which places the main verb of a verb string (e.g., "transformed" in "had been transformed") at the end of a phrase. The difference can be seen in the contrast between the original German version of the first sentence in Kafka's The Metamorphosis:

Als Gregor Samsa eines Morgens aus unruhigen Träumen erwachte, fand er sich in seinem Bett zu einem ungeheuren Ungeziefer verwandelt. (Original)
As Gregor Samsa one morning from restless dreams awoke, found he himself in his bed into an enormous vermin transformed. (literal word-for-word translation)
"As Gregor Samsa awoke one morning from uneasy dreams he found himself transformed in his bed into a gigantic insect". (Willa Muir, 1933)

Another virtually insurmountable problem facing translators is how to deal with the author's intentional use of ambiguous idioms and words that have several meanings which result in writings difficult to precisely translate. One such instance is found in the first sentence of The Metamorphosis. English translators have often sought to render the word Ungeziefer as "insect"; in today's German it means vermin. It is sometimes used colloquially to mean "bug"—a very general term, unlike the scientific sounding "insect". Kafka had no intention of labeling Gregor, the protagonist of the story, as any specific thing, but instead wanted to convey Gregor's disgust at his transformation. Translators have chosen numerous inexact and unsatisfactory ways to represent "[zu einem] ungeheuren Ungeziefer", unable to convey the repetition of the first two syllables and the equal four syllables of the two words in German:

- "gigantic insect" (Muir, 1948)
- "monstrous vermin" (Corngold, 1972; Neugroschel, 1993/1995; Freed, 1996)
- "giant bug" (Underwood, 1981)
- "monstrous insect" (Pasley, 1992; Stokes, 1992; Pelzer, 2017; Harman, 2024)
- "enormous bug" (Appelbaum, 1996)
- "monstrous cockroach" (Hofmann, 2007)
- "huge verminous insect" (Williams, 2011)

Another example is Kafka's use of the German noun Verkehr in the final sentence of The Judgment. Literally, Verkehr means intercourse and, as in English, can have either a sexual or non-sexual meaning; in addition, it is used to mean transport or traffic. The sentence can be translated as: "At that moment an unending stream of traffic crossed over the bridge". What gives added weight to the obvious double meaning of 'Verkehr' is Kafka's confession to Brod that when he wrote that final line, he was thinking of "a violent ejaculation".

==== Selected publications in English ====
Title	Genre	Translator	Publisher	Date of publication	Place of publication	Remarks
The Castle	novel	Willa Muir and Edwin Muir	Secker & Warburg	1930	London	
The Great Wall of China	story collection	Willa Muir and Edwin Muir	Martin Secker	1933	London	
The Trial	novel	Willa Muir and Edwin Muir	Victor Gollancz	1937	London	
America	novel	Willa Muir and Edwin Muir	Schocken Books	1938	United States	
The Diaries of Franz Kafka	diaries	Joseph Kresh, Martin Greenberg and Hannah Arendt	Peregrine Books	1963	United States	
The Diaries of Franz Kafka	diaries	Ross Benjamin	Schocken Books	2023	United States	
Amerika	novel	Mark Harman	Schocken Books	2008	United States	
The Penal Colony: Stories and Short Pieces	story collection	Willa Muir and Edwin Muir	Schocken Books	1948	United States	
Dearest Father. Stories and Other Writings	letters	Ernst Kaiser and Eithne Wilkins	Schocken Books	1954	United States	
Description of a Struggle	story collection	Tania and James Stern	Schocken Books	1958	United States	
Parables and Paradoxes	story collection	Clement Greenberg, Ernst Kaiser & Eithne Wilkins, Willa Muir & Edwin Muir, Tania & James Stern	Schocken Books	1961	United States	
The Complete Stories	story collection	Willa Muir & Edwin Muir, Tania & James Stern	Schocken Books	1971	United States	
Letters to Family, Friends, and Editors	letters	Richard and Clara Winston	Schocken Books	1977	United States	
The Sons	story collection		Schocken Books	1989	United States	
The Zürau Aphorisms	aphorisms	Michael Hofmann; Geoffrey Brock	Schocken Books	2006	United States	
Lost in America	novel	Anthony Northey	Vitalis Verlag	2010	Prague	
The Trial	novel	Susanne Lück, Maureen Fitzgibbons	Vitalis Verlag	2012	Prague	
The Castle	novel	Jon Calame, Seth Rogoff, Anthony Northey	Vitalis Verlag	2014	Prague	
Letter to Father	letters	Karen Reppin	Vitalis Verlag	2016	Prague	
The Metamorphosis	short story	Karen Reppin	Vitalis Verlag	2016	Prague	
A Country Doctor	story collection	Siegfried Mortkowitz	Vitalis Verlag	2017	Prague	
Meditation	story collection	Siegfried Mortkowitz	Vitalis Verlag	2017	Prague	

==== Schocken editions ====
Title	Year	Translators	Notes
The Great Wall of China. Stories and Reflections	1946	Willa and Edwin Muir	
The Penal Colony: Stories and Short Pieces	1948	Willa and Edwin Muir	
Dearest Father. Stories and Other Writings	1954	Ernst Kaiser and Eithne Wilkins	
Description of a Struggle	1958	Tania and James Stern	
Parables and Paradoxes	1961	Clement Greenberg; Richard and Clara Winston; Ernst Kaiser and Eithne Wilkins; Willa and Edwin Muir; Tania and James Stern	Bilingual edition
The Complete Stories	1971	Willa and Edwin Muir; Tania and James Stern	Reprinted in 1995 with a foreword by John Updike
I Am a Memory Come Alive	1974	Martin Greenberg and Hannah Arendt; Joseph Kresh; Gerald Onn; Willa and Edwin Muir; Tania and James Stern; Ernst Kaiser and Eithne Wilkins	Autobiographical writings selected from diaries, letters and aphorisms
The Sons	1989	Willa and Edwin Muir	Translations revised and updated by Arthur Wensinger
The Metamorphosis, In the Penal Colony, and Other Stories	1995	Willa and Edwin Muir	Includes all the stories published in Kafka's lifetime
The Zürau Aphorisms	2006	Michael Hofmann; Geoffrey Brock	

==== Other editions ====
Title	Year	Publisher	Translators	Notes
The Basic Kafka	1979	Pocket Books	Willa and Edwin Muir; Tania and James Stern; Richard and Clara Winston	A selection from Kafka's short stories, diaries and letters
Franz Kafka Stories 1904-1924	1981	Abacus	J. A. Underwood	Short stories
The Penguin Complete Novels of Franz Kafka	1983	Penguin Books	Willa and Edwin Muir	Includes The Trial, The Castle and Amerika; republished by Vintage in 1999
The Great Wall of China and Other Short Works	1991	Penguin Books	Malcolm Pasley	First published under the title Shorter Works, Volume 1, by Martin Secker & Warburg 1973
The Transformation and Other Stories: Works Published During Kafka's Lifetime	1992	Penguin Books	Malcolm Pasley	Short stories
The Metamorphosis and Other Stories	1993	Scribner	Joachim Neugroschel	Collection of 30 short stories. Later editions include 39, then 41, stories under the title The Metamorphosis, In the Penal Colony, and Other Stories
Metamorphosis and Other Stories	2007	Penguin Classics	Michael Hofmann	Short stories
Franz Kafka: The Office Writings	2008	Princeton University Press	Eric Patton; Ruth Hein	A selection of Kafka's professional writings
Kafka's Greatest Stories	2010	Vook		Enhanced with video providing historical background on Kafka's life and influences
Essential Kafka: Rendezvous with Otherness	2011	Authorhouse		Enhanced with video providing historical background on Kafka's life and influences
Konundrum: Selected Prose of Franz Kafka	2016	Archipelago Books	Peter Wortsman	A selection from Kafka's short stories, diaries and letters
Investigations of a Dog & Other Creatures	2017	New Directions	Michael Hofmann	Short stories
The Lost Writings	2020	New Directions	Michael Hofmann	
Selected Stories	2024	The Belknap Press of Harvard University Press	Mark Harman	Short stories

== Collaborations ==
English title	Original German title	Written with:	Notes
Richard and Samuel	Richard und Samuel	Max Brod	Intended to be a novel; only the first chapter was completed.

== Bibliography ==
- Brod, Max (1960). Franz Kafka: A Biography. New York: Schocken Books. ISBN 978-0-805-20047-8.
- Deleuze, Gilles; Guattari, Félix (1986). Kafka: Toward a Minor Literature. Theory and History of Literature, Vol 30. Minneapolis, MN: University of Minnesota Press. ISBN 978-0-81661-515-5.
- Hawes, James (2008). Why You Should Read Kafka Before You Waste Your Life. New York: St. Martin's Press. ISBN 978-0-31237-651-2.
- Kafka, Franz (1996). The Metamorphosis and Other Stories. New York: Barnes & Noble. ISBN 978-1-56619-969-8.
- Lawson, Richard H. (1960). "Ungeheueres Ungeziefer in Kafka's "Die Verwandlung"". The German Quarterly. 33 (3): 216–219. doi:10.2307/402242. JSTOR 402242.
- Newmark, Peter (1991). About Translation. Wiltshire, England: Cromwell Press Ltd. ISBN 978-1-85359-117-4.
- Rhine, Marjorie E. (Winter 1989). "Untangling Kafka's Knotty Texts: The Translator's Prerogative?". Monatshefte. 81 (4). Madison, Wisconsin: 447–458. JSTOR 30166262.
