= The Penal Colony: Stories and Short Pieces =

1948 collection of writings by Franz Kafka

The Penal Colony
- First edition
- Author: Franz Kafka
- Translator: Willa and Edwin Muir
- Language: English
- Genre: Short stories
- Publisher: Schocken Books
- Publication date: 1948
- Publication place: United States

The Penal Colony: Stories and Short Pieces is a collection of short stories and recollections by Franz Kafka, with additional writings by Max Brod. First published in 1948 by Schocken Books, this volume includes all the works Kafka intended for publication, and published during his lifetime (the only exception is "The Stoker", which serves as a first chapter for the novel Amerika). It also includes critical pieces by Kafka, "The First Long Train Journey" by Kafka and Brod (which was initially intended to be the first chapter of a book), and an Epilogue by Brod. The collection was translated by Willa and Edwin Muir.

== Contents ==
- Conversation with the Supplicant

a slightly different version from the text of the dialogue as it appears in the story Description of a Struggle

- Meditation
  - Children on a Country Road
  - The Trees
  - Clothes
  - Excursion into the Mountains
  - Rejection
  - The Street Window
  - The Tradesman
  - Absent-minded Window-gazing
  - The Way Home
  - Passers-by
  - On the Tram
  - Reflections for Gentlemen-Jockeys
  - The Wish to be a Red Indian
  - Unhappiness
  - Bachelor's Ill Luck
  - Unmasking a Confidence Trickster
  - The Sudden Walk
  - Resolutions
- The Judgment
- The Metamorphosis
- A Country Doctor
  - The New Advocate
  - A Country Doctor
  - Up in the Gallery
  - An Old Manuscript
  - Before the Law
  - Jackals and Arabs
  - A Visit to a Mine
  - The Next Village
  - An Imperial Message
  - The Cares of a Family Man
  - Eleven Sons
  - A Fratricide
  - A Dream
  - A Report to an Academy
  - The Bucket Rider
- In the Penal Colony
- A Hunger Artist
  - First Sorrow
  - A Little Woman
  - A Hunger Artist
  - Josephine the Singer, or The Mouse Folk
- Appendix
  - The First Long Train Journey - by Kafka and Brod
  - The Aeroplanes at Brescia
  - Three Critical Pieces
    - A Novel about Youth - Review of Felix Sternheim's Die Geschichte des jungen Oswald
    - On Kleist's "Anecdotes"
    - Hyperion - Review of the literary magazine
  - Epilogue by Max Brod
