= Parables and Paradoxes =

1961 book by Franz Kafka

- First edition
- Author: Franz Kafka
- Original title: 'Parabeln und Paradoxe'
- Translator: Clement Greenberg, Ernst Kaiser & Eithne Wilkins, Willa & Edwin Muir, Tania & James Stern
- Cover artist: Paul Bacon (photo by Jan Lukas)
- Language: English, German
- Genre: Parables, Fables, Paradoxes
- Publisher: Schocken Books
- Publication date: 1961
- Publication place: United States
- Media type: Print (hardback & paperback)
- Pages: 190
- ISBN: 0-8052-0422-9
- OCLC: 10988104

Parables and Paradoxes (Parabeln und Paradoxe) is a bilingual edition of selected writings by Franz Kafka edited by Nahum N. Glatzer (Schocken Books, 1961). In this volume of collected pieces, Kafka re-examines and rewrites some basic mythical tales of the Israelites, Ancient Greeks, Far East, and the Western World, as well as creations of his own imagination.

The material in the book is drawn from Kafka's notebooks, diaries, letters, short fictional works and the novel The Trial. An earlier version of the collection appeared under the title Parables, and included a smaller selection of works.

== Contents ==
- On Parables

I

- An Imperial Message
- Pekin and the Emperor
- The News of the Building of the Wall: a Fragment
- The Great wall and the Tower of Babel

II

- Paradise
- The Tower of Babel
- The Pit of Babel
- The City Coat of Arms
- Abraham
- Mount Sinai
- The Building of the Temple
- The Animal in the Synagogue
- Before the Law
- The Watchman
- The Coming of the Messiah

III

- Prometheus
- Poseidon
- The Silence of the Sirens
- The Sirens
- Leopards in the Temple
- Alexander the Great
- Diogenes
- The New Attorney

IV

- The Building of a City
- The Imperial Colonel
- The Emperor
- In the Caravanary
- The Cell
- The Invention of the Devil
- The Savages
- The Hunter Gracchus + Fragment
- The Vulture
- The Green Dragon
- The Tiger
- The Problem of Our Laws
- The Refusal
- Couriers
- A Chinese Puzzle
- The Truth about Sancho Panza
- The Test
- Robinson Crusoe
- The Spring
- The Hunger Strike
- My Destination

== Translations ==
Parables and Paradoxes brings together short texts from the wide variety of Kafka's works. Since different texts were handled by different translators this volume allows readers to compare the various ways Kafka's works have been rendered into English. The translators included are:

- Clement Greenberg
- Ernst Kaiser and Eithne Wilkins
- Willa and Edwin Muir
- Tania and James Stern
