= Investigations of a Dog =

- Short story by Franz Kafka
- Original title: Forschungen eines Hundes
- Language: German
- Genre: Short story

Publication
- Published in: Beim Bau der Chinesischen Mauer
- Media type: book (hardcover)
- Publication date: 1931
- Published in English: 1933 London, Martin Secker; 1946 New York, Schocken Books

"Investigations of a Dog" (German: "Forschungen eines Hundes") is a short story by Franz Kafka written in 1922. It was published posthumously in Beim Bau der Chinesischen Mauer (Berlin, 1931). The first English translation by Willa and Edwin Muir was published by Martin Secker in London in 1933. In 1946 it was published by Schocken Books in The Great Wall of China: Stories and Reflections. Told from the perspective of a dog, the story concerns the nature and limits of knowledge, by way of the dog's inquiries into the practices of his culture.

"Investigations of a Dog" was written in September and October 1922, soon after Kafka ended work on his unfinished novel The Castle. Similar to other Kafka stories such as "A Report to an Academy", "Josephine the Singer", and "The Burrow", the protagonist is an animal.

== Plot ==
The unnamed narrator, a dog, recounts episodes from its past, in which it used quasi-scientific and rational methods to resolve basic questions of its existence that most of its peers were content to leave unanswered, such as: "Whence does the Earth procure its food?".

Many of the seemingly absurd descriptions employed by the narrator express its misapprehension or confusion about the world, centering on dogkind's apparent inability to realize (or, some passages suggest, unwillingness to acknowledge) the existence of their human masters: the narrator is shocked into scientific investigation by witnessing seven dogs standing on their hind legs and performing to music (a troupe of circus or performing animals) and spends much time investigating "soaring dogs" (i.e. lapdogs carried by their unacknowledged human owners), tiny dogs lacking legs that exist above the heads of normal dogs while constantly talking nonsense, and what actions or rituals summon forth food.
