= Letters to Family, Friends, and Editors =

Letters to Friends, Family, and Editors
- First English edition (1977)
- Author: Franz Kafka
- Original title: 'Briefe 1902-1924'
- Translator: Richard and Clara Winston
- Cover artist: Anthony Russo
- Language: German
- Genre: Letters
- Publisher: Schocken Books
- Publication date: 1959
- Publication place: United States
- English publication date: 1977
- Media type: Print, Paperback & Hardcover
- Pages: 509 p.
- ISBN: 0-8052-0949-2
- OCLC: 22379406

Letters to Family, Friends, and Editors is a book collecting some of Franz Kafka's letters from 1900 to 1924. The majority of the letters in the volume are addressed to Max Brod. Originally published in Germany in 1959 as Briefe 1902-1924, the collection was first published in English by Schocken Books in 1977. It was translated by Richard and Clara Winston.

== Correspondents ==
=== Family ===
  - Julie and Hermann Kafka - parents
  - Elli Hermann, née Kafka - sister
  - Valli Pollak, née Kafka - sister
  - Ottla Davidová, née Kafka - sister
    - Josef David - Ottla's husband
  - Siegfried Löwy - uncle

Other letters to the family are collected in Letters to Ottla

Kafka's long, undelivered Letter to His Father was published separately. It also appears in Dearest Father and The Sons.

=== Friends ===
  - Oskar Pollak - Childhood friend and art historian; a 1902 letter to him includes Kafka's oldest surviving work of fiction - "Shamefaced Lanky and Impure in Heart"
  - Max Brod - Closest friend; writer and Kafka's literary executor
    - Elsa Brod, née Taussig - Brod's wife
    - Sophie Friedmann, née Brod - Brod's sister
    - Emmy Salveter - Max Brod's friend and possible lover
  - Felix Weltsch - Classmate; philosopher and Zionist
    - Lise Kaznelson, née Weltsch - Weltsch's cousin
    - Irma Weltsch - Weltsch's wife
  - Oskar Baum - Author, music teacher, and organist
    - Leo Baum - Baum's son
  - Robert Klopstock - Close friend, stayed with Kafka through his illness

=== Romantic Interests ===
  - Selma Kohn Robitschek
  - Hedwig W. - a letter from 1907 includes a poem Kafka claims he wrote "years ago."
  - Minze Eisner
  - Tile Rössler

The letters to Milena Jesenská and Felice Bauer are collected in respective volumes. Letters to Felice also includes Kafka's letters to Grete Bloch.

=== Publishers, Writers and Artists ===
  - Ernst Rowohlt - Publisher
  - Willy Haas - Prague-born writer and journalist, editor of Herder-Blätter magazine
  - Otto Stoessl - Austrian writer
  - Kurt Wolff - Publisher
  - Martin Buber - Philosopher and religious writer
  - Robert Musil (debatable) - Writer
  - Alfred Kubin - Graphic artist and illustrator
  - René Schickele - Alsatian writer and pacifist; editor of Die Weissen Blätter during the war years.
  - Ernst Feigl - Prague-born poet and writer
  - Gottfried Kölwel - Poet
  - Josef Körner - Literary historian and critic
  - Johannes Urzidil - Prague-born writer and journalist, managing editor of Der Mensch
  - Julie Wohryzek's sister (unnamed) - Sister of Kafka's former fiancée
  - Carl Seelig - Writer, critic, and editor (e.g. Robert Walser)

=== Casual Acquaintances ===
  - Director Eisner - Department head at Assicurazioni Generali, where Kafka worked, who was supportive of Kafka and highly interested in literature. Kafka asked for Max Brod's copy of Hyperion in order to lend it to Eisner as compensation for Eisner lending Kafka many issues of Rundschau. Kafka advised him to buy Robert Walser's The Tanners, and told him that Jakob von Gunten was a good book.
  - Gertrud Thieberger - Sister of Kafka's Hebrew teacher, future wife of Johannes Urzidil
  - Yitzhak Löwy - Actor
  - Ludwig Hardt - Reciting artist, included some of Kafka's writing in his work
  - Hugo Bergmann - Former classmate; Philosopher and Zionist
    - Else Bergmann - Hugo Bergmann's wife

== Conversation Slips ==
Both German and English editions of the book include a selection from the slips of paper Kafka used to communicate during the last few weeks of his life, when he was advised not to speak.

== Sources ==
Kafka, Franz. Letters to Family, Friends, and Editors. New York City: Schocken Books, 1977. ISBN 0-8052-0949-2
