= Josef K =

Josef K may refer to:

- Josef K., the name of the protagonist of the novel The Trial and the short story A Dream by Franz Kafka
- Josef K (band), Scottish post-punk band
- Officer K, nicknamed "Joe", from Blade Runner 2049.
