= The Burrow (short story) =

- Short story by Franz Kafka
- Original title: Der Bau
- Language: German
- Genre: Short story

Publication
- Published in: Beim Bau der Chinesischen Mauer
- Media type: book (hardcover)
- Publication date: 1931
- Published in English: 1933 London, Martin Secker; 1946 New York, Schocken Books

"The Burrow" (German: "Der Bau") is an unfinished short story by Franz Kafka written six months before his death. In the story a badger-like creature struggles to secure the labyrinthine burrow he has excavated as a home. The story was published posthumously in Beim Bau der Chinesischen Mauer (Berlin, 1931) by Max Brod, Kafka's friend and literary executor. The first English translation, by Willa and Edwin Muir, was published by Martin Secker in London in 1933. It appeared in The Great Wall of China. Stories and Reflections (New York City: Schocken Books, 1946).

Kafka is alleged to have written an ending to the story detailing a struggle with an invading beast, but this completed version was among the works destroyed by lover Dora Diamant following Kafka's death. Like "The Metamorphosis", "A Report to an Academy", "Investigations of a Dog" and "Josephine the Singer, or the Mouse Folk", "The Burrow" presents an anthropomorphic animal. Kafka worked frequently in this genre.

== Contents ==
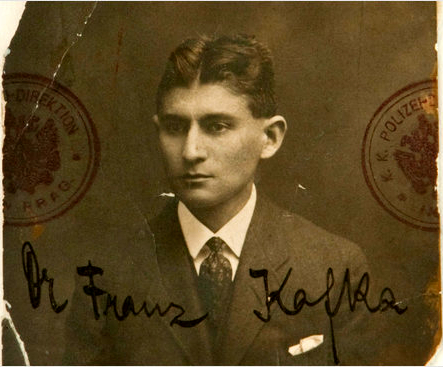
Franz Kafka

The first-person narrator is an ambiguous burrowing animal. The only direct references to his anatomy are to a "forehead", which he uses to compact the loose earth around the section of his burrow referred to as the "Castle Keep”, “paws” and “claws”.

The creature lives in constant fear of attack from enemies. This leads to compulsive attempts to make the burrow perfectly secure. Along with the Castle Keep, the entrance to the burrow is a source of constant anxiety. Later in the story the creature becomes obsessed by a persistent noise and resolves to dedicate his energy to the identification and elimination of its source.

The last sentence of the story reads "But all remained unchanged, the—". This sentence is at the end of a page, implying that Kafka had written more and perhaps fashioned an ending. In order to publish the story with the semblance of a conclusion, Max Brod edited the last sentence to "But all remained the same."

== Themes ==
Kafka's hyper-rational creature functions as a phenomenological parody of human reason.

== Quotes ==
"I have completed the construction of my burrow and it seems to be successful."

"...[T]he most beautiful thing about my burrow is the stillness. Of course, that is deceptive. At any moment it may be shattered and then all will be over. For the time being, however, the silence is with me."

"You live in peace, warm, well-nourished, master, sole master of all your manifold passages and rooms, and all this you are prepared—not to give up, of course—but to risk it, so to speak; you nurse the confident hope, certainly, that you will regain it; yet is it not a dangerous, far too dangerous stake that you are playing for? Can there be any reasonable grounds for such a step? No, for such acts as these there can be no reasonable grounds."

"I almost screw myself to the point of deciding to emigrate to distant parts and take up my old comfortless life again, which had no security whatever, but was one indiscriminate succession of perils, yet in consequence prevented one from perceiving and fearing particular perils, as I am constantly reminded by comparing my secure burrow with ordinary life."

== References in other media ==
- A parody of the story appears as part of the short story "The Notebooks of Bob K." by Jonathan Lethem, which is collected in Kafka Americana. In the story Batman's Batcave is presented as a version of the burrow.
- Ian McEwan quotes "The Burrow" in one of two epigraphs to his novel The Innocent.
