= On Parables =

- Short story by Franz Kafka
- Original title: Von den Gleichnissen
- Language: German
- Genre(s): Short story

Publication
- Published in: Beim Bau der Chinesischen Mauer
- Media type: book (hardcover)
- Publication date: 1931
- Published in English: 1933 London, Martin Secker; 1946 New York, Schocken Books

"On Parables" (German: "Von den Gleichnissen") is a short story fragment by Franz Kafka. It was not published until 1931, seven years after his death. Max Brod selected stories and published them in the collection Beim Bau der Chinesischen Mauer. The first English translation by Willa and Edwin Muir was published by Martin Secker in London in 1933. It appeared in The Great Wall of China. Stories and Reflections (New York City: Schocken Books, 1946).

The piece consists of a narrative on the merits of parables. The debate is whether they are useful or merely folklore handed down from one generation to the next. The narrator mentions that parables are not necessarily useful; after all, they've been around for many years, but despite their "wisdom," people still struggle with the same difficulties. The story ends by claiming that the text can be interpreted as a parable.

== Analysis ==
The story was written while Kafka was reading Judaica and was particularly interested in the lore associated with Mishna. Kafka's The Blue Octavo Notebooks are full of parables, many observations about daily life intertwined with poignant twists.
