= The Sons =

Cover of The Sons, Schocken Books, 1989

The Sons is a collection of stories by Franz Kafka.

In 1913 Kafka wrote to his publisher Kurt Wolff requesting that three of his stories be placed in a single volume:

"The Stoker, The Metamorphosis, and The Judgment belong together, both inwardly and outwardly. There is an obvious connection among the three, and, even more important, a secret one, for which reason I would be reluctant to forgo the chance of having them published together in a book, which might be called The Sons."

The volume, published by Schocken Books, also includes Kafka's Letter to His Father, which could be seen as another "son story", in this case located somewhere between fiction and autobiography.
