= The Truth about Sancho Panza =

Short story by Franz Kafka

- Short story by Franz Kafka
- Original title: Die Wahrheit über Sancho Pansa
- Language: German
- Genre: Short story

Publication
- Published in: Beim Bau der Chinesischen Mauer
- Publication date: 1931
- Published in English: 1933 London, Martin Secker; 1946 New York, Schocken Books
- Media type: book (hardcover)

"The Truth about Sancho Panza" (German: "Die Wahrheit über Sancho Pansa") is a short story by Franz Kafka. It was published in 1931, seven years after the death of Kafka. Max Brod selected stories and published them in the collection Beim Bau der Chinesischen Mauer. The first English translation by Willa and Edwin Muir was published by Martin Secker in London in 1933. It appeared in The Great Wall of China: Stories and Reflections (New York City: Schocken Books, 1946).

A parable rather than a story, the short piece centers on the role of Sancho Panza, a principal character in Don Quixote. The narrator theorizes that Panza was a well of tales, lore and wisdom, as well as having a particular demon to exorcise. While using up these witticisms, Panza succeeded in ridding himself of stories and tales on his mind, fed them to Quixote, and was thus able to live a full life without the burden.
