= The Blue Octavo Notebooks =

Collection of notes by Franz Kafka

The Blue Octavo Notebooks (German: Acht blaue Oktavhefte), sometimes referred to as The Eight Octavo Notebooks, is a series of eight notebooks written by Franz Kafka from late 1917 until June 1919. The name was given to them by Max Brod, Kafka's literary executor, to differentiate them from the regular quarto-sized notebooks Kafka used as diaries. Along with the octavo notebooks, Brod also found a series of extracts copied out and numbered by Kafka. Brod named this selection of 109 entries Betrachtungen über Sünde, Leid, Hoffnung und den wahren Weg [Reflections on Sin, Suffering, Hope, and the True Way] and included it in the 1931 collection The Great Wall of China. Roberto Calasso published this collection with the title The Zürau Aphorisms in 2006.

== Publication ==
1991 single volume publication, Exact Change publishers

When Brod published Kafka's diaries in 1948 he decided to omit the octavo notebooks, because he considered their contents more philosophical and literary than the regular diaries Kafka kept. The octavo notebooks were later included in a volume of fragments and uncollected writings published in 1953, along with the numbered extracts. The notebooks first appeared in English in Dearest Father: Stories and Other Writings (Schocken Books, 1954). Some English printings removed the extracts from their original place in the notebooks to avoid repetition.

The Blue Octavo Notebooks were published in English in a single volume edition by Exact Change (1991, ISBN 1-878972-04-9). This edition includes the complete notebooks, the numbered extracts, and Max Brod's original notes.

== Analysis ==
Scholars have noted that from late 1917 until June 1919, Kafka stopped writing entries in his diaries, and instead wrote in these notebooks, the bulk of which were aphorisms. The notebooks contain fragments, but like much of Kafka's writings they allude to important themes about the human condition. The notebooks express Kafka's interest in Judaic studies, though he continued to live a secular life. Kafka was reading Kierkegaard's Fear and Trembling during the time he wrote in these notebooks.
