= The Zürau Aphorisms =

Collection of aphorisms by Franz Kafka

- 2014 Harvill Secker publication
- Editor: Roberto Calasso
- Author: Franz Kafka
- Language: German
- Publication place: Germany
- Media type: Print

The Zürau Aphorisms (German: Die Zürauer Aphorismen) are 109 aphorisms of Franz Kafka, written from September 1917 to April 1918 and published by his friend Max Brod in 1931, after his death, in the 1931 collection The Great Wall of China. They are selected from his writing in Zürau in West Bohemia (now Siřem in the community of Blšany, Czech Republic) where, suffering from tuberculosis, he stayed with his sister Ottla. Brod titled the book "Betrachtungen über Sünde, Hoffnung, Leid und den wahren Weg" (Reflections on Sin, Hope, Suffering, and the True Way).

== Origin ==
After he was diagnosed with tuberculosis in August 1917, in order to recover, Kafka moved for a few months to the Bohemian village of Zürau, where his sister Ottla worked on the farm of her brother-in-law Hermann. He felt very comfortable there and later described his time there as perhaps the best in his life, probably because he had no responsibilities to work, parents and women.

Kafka had decided not to do literary work there. However, he kept diaries and the eight Blue Octavo Notebooks. From the notes in these books Kafka extracted 109 numbered pieces of text on "Zettel", single pieces of paper in no given order. These aphorisms were first published in 1931 by Kiepenheuer & Witsch, under the title Brod had chosen: "Betrachtungen über Sünde, Hoffnung, Leid und den wahren Weg" (Reflections on Sin, Hope, Suffering, and the True Way).

== Content ==
The aphorisms are strict reflections on metaphysical topics, dealing with good and evil, truth and falsehood, alienation and redemption, death and paradise. They are Kafka's only texts dealing directly with theological issues. The philosophical reflections are inspired by the world of ideas of Schopenhauer, namely Die Welt als Wille und Vorstellung (The World as Will and Representation), as well as Kierkegaard's interpretations of the fall of man.

The individual aphorisms are not related to each other; some have a narrative character, others present images or parables.

Entry 16, "A cage went in search of a bird", was used as the title of a 2024 collection of ten short stories edited by Becca Rothfeld. The Australian author Gretchen Shirm describes in a review this aphorism as an allegory for Han Kang's novel We Do Not Part.

== Reception ==
Peter-André Alt notes in his biography of Kafka: "Again, the negative dimension of Kafka's life term is visible, which remains supported by the view that the individual must inevitably be caught up in self-deception, lies and deceit, if it seeks to improve its earthly situation."

Reiner Stach remarks: "Much remains fragmentary: again and again, scattered sentences that trail off into nothingness, between them formulations that erupt like aphorisms, imagistic and compelling, once more interrupted by searching motions, diffuse and breaking off unmediated — which Kafka rigidly separates from each other with slashes."

In a review of a 2012 edition of facsimiles of The Zürau Aphorisms, Friedmann Apel sees wording similar to the later novel The Castle, which seems often to be addressing Kafka's father. He quotes the aphorism printed first in Brod's book: Der wahre Weg geht über ein Seil, das nicht in der Höhe gespannt ist, sondern knapp über dem Boden. Es scheint mehr bestimmt stolpern zu machen als begangen zu werden. (The true way goes via a rope, which is suspended not high up but just above the ground. It seems designed more to make one stumble than to be walked.) He points out, that right after evoking an artist on his way to truth, full of danger, Kafka turns to the small scale, even to humor. Apel sees here and in other aphorisms refined deconstructions of certainties (raffinierte Dekonstruktionen von Gewissheiten).

== Editions ==
- Franz Kafka. Die Zürauer Aphorismen ed. Roberto Calasso, Suhrkamp Verlag, 2006, ISBN 978-3-518-22408-3.
- The Zürau Aphorisms of Franz Kafka. Translated from the German by Michael Hofmann; Commentary by Roberto Calasso. New York: Schocken Books, 2006, ISBN 0-8052-1207-8.
- Franz Kafka. Nachgelassene Schriften und Fragmente II ed. Jost Schillemeit, S. Fischer, Frankfurt am Main 2002, pp. 113–140.
- Roland Reuß: Zürauer Zettel. 106 Zettel auf Einzelblättern, Stroemfeld Verlag, Frankfurt am Main, 2012.
