= Letters to Milena =

1952 book

- First edition
- Author: Franz Kafka
- Original title: Briefe an Milena
- Translator: Tania and James Stern (1st edition); Philip Boehm (2nd edition)
- Language: German
- Genre: Letters
- Publisher: Schocken Books
- Publication date: 1952 (1st), 1986 (2nd)
- English publication date: 1953 (1st), 1990 (2nd)
- Media type: Print, hard and paperback
- Pages: 298 p.
- ISBN: 0-8052-0885-2
- OCLC: 19814322
- Dewey Decimal: 833/.912 B 19
- LC Class: PT2621.A26 Z48613 1990

Letters to Milena is a book collecting some of Franz Kafka's letters to Milena Jesenská from 1920 to 1923. The English translation of the letters states, "Whereas Kafka generally wrote to Milena in German, most of her letters were in her mother tongue" of Czech (p. xvii).

== Publication history ==
The letters were originally published in German in 1952 as when the Milena, edited by Willy Haas, who deleted some passages that he thought might hurt people who were still living at the time. The collection was first published in English by Schocken Books in 1953, translated by Tania and James Stern. A new German edition, restoring the passages Haas had deleted, was published in 1983, followed by a new English translation by Philip Boehm in 1990. This edition includes some of Milena's letters to Max Brod, as well as four essays she wrote and her obituary for Kafka.

== Quote ==
The easy possibility of writing letters must have brought wrack and ruin to the souls of the world. Writing letters is actually an intercourse with ghosts, and by no means just the ghost of the addressee but also with one's own ghost, which secretly evolves inside the letter one is writing. (p. ix)

== In popular culture ==
The historical fiction novel Letters to Kafka by Christine Estima, published by House of Anansi Press, imagines what Milena Jesenská's lost letters to Kafka might have said. The novel works in concert with Letters to Milena.
