= Up in the Gallery =

Short story by Franz Kafka

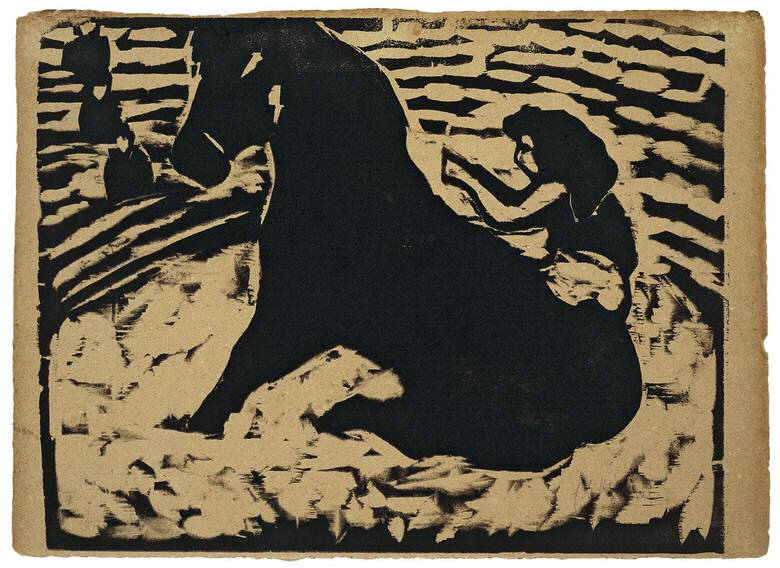
Envisioning a circus act.

"Up in the Gallery" (German: "Auf der Galerie") is a short piece of fiction written by Franz Kafka. It was created between November 1916 and February 1917 and published in the collection Ein Landarzt (A Country Doctor) in 1919. The story offers two versions of a scene in which a young man watches a circus ringmaster and a woman on horseback.

== Text ==
Up in the Gallery

If some frail tubercular lady circus rider were to be driven in circles around and around the arena for months and months without interruption in front of a tireless public on a swaying horse by a merciless whip-wielding master of ceremonies, spinning on the horse, throwing kisses and swaying at the waist, and if this performance, amid the incessant roar of the orchestra and the ventilators, were to continue into the ever-expanding, gray future, accompanied by applause, which died down and then swelled up again, from hands which were really steam hammers, perhaps then a young visitor to the gallery might rush down the long stair case through all the levels, burst into the ring, and cry "Stop!" through the fanfares of the constantly adjusting orchestra.

But since things are not like that—since a beautiful woman, in white and red, flies in through curtains which proud men in livery open in front of her, since the director, devotedly seeking her eyes, breathes in her direction, behaving like an animal, and, as a precaution, lifts her up on the dapple-gray horse, as if she were his grand daughter, the one he loved more than anything else, as she starts a dangerous journey, but he cannot decide to give the signal with his whip and finally, controlling himself, gives it a crack, runs right beside the horse with his mouth open, follows the rider's leaps with a sharp gaze, hardly capable of comprehending her skill, tries to warn her by calling out in English, furiously castigating the grooms holding hoops, telling them to pay the most scrupulous attention, and begs the orchestra, with upraised arms, to be quiet before the great jump, finally lifts the small woman down from the trembling horse, kisses her on both cheeks, considers no public tribute adequate, while she herself, leaning on him, high on the tips of her toes, with dust swirling around her, arms outstretched and head thrown back, wants to share her luck with the entire circus—since this is how things are, the visitor to the gallery puts his face on the railing and, sinking into the final march as if into a difficult dream, weeps, without realizing it.

Public domain translation by Ian Johnston (November 2003):

== Story ==
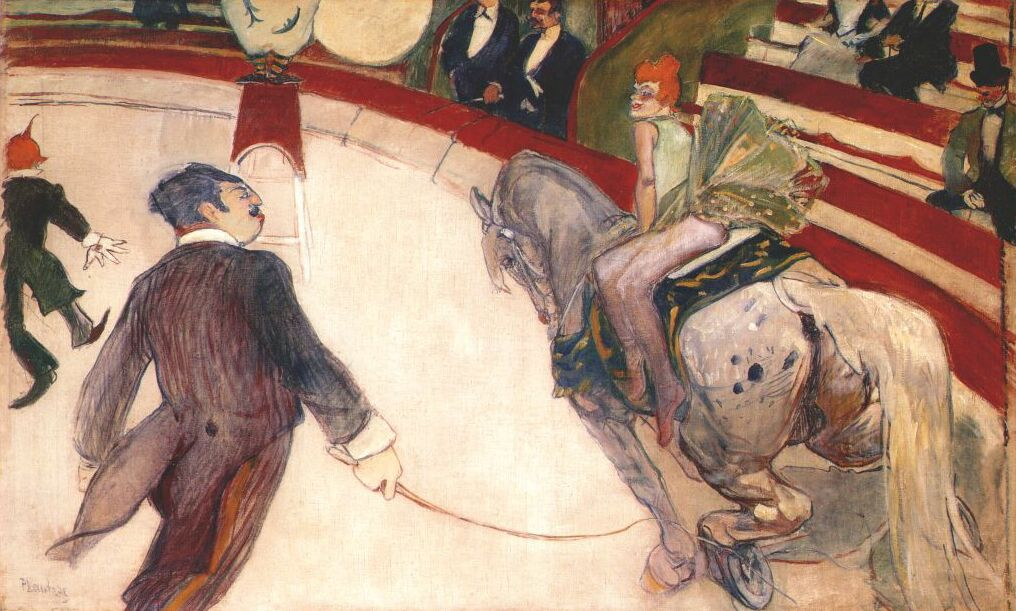
A materialist reading of the story might focus on concrete exploitation of the Kunstreiterin's labor.

The story features three human characters:

- The Kunstreiterin, a woman performer riding a horse (Pferd) in circles around an arena;
- The Direktor, a circus ringmaster who supervises the woman's progress; and
- The Galeriebesucher, a spectator at the circus who watches from the gallery.

The story has two paragraphs. The first paragraph describes a possible (subjective) reality, in which the Galeriebesucher witnesses the Kunstreiterin (and her Pferd) suffering because the cruel Direktor forces them to perform. The Galeriebesucher rushes into the arena to intervene. The second paragraph describes "how things are" (objective): the Direktor seems protective of the Kunstreiterin and orchestrates her performance only reluctantly, while the Galeriebesucher absorbs the scenario—and unconsciously weeps.

== Exegesis ==
The first scenario is mechanical and out of focus; the sound of the orchestra blends with the noise of the ventilators and the audience's applauding hands are "really steamhammers". In the second scenario, details are precise, sequential, and dramatic. The Galeriebesucher identifies heavily with the situation he witnesses, such that these details seem to encompass his worldview (and govern his action). In the first sentence, he seems empowered to change the situation; in the second, he seems helpless. The noise of the story and the tempo of the writing coincide to emphasize this moment of intervention at the end of the first sentence.

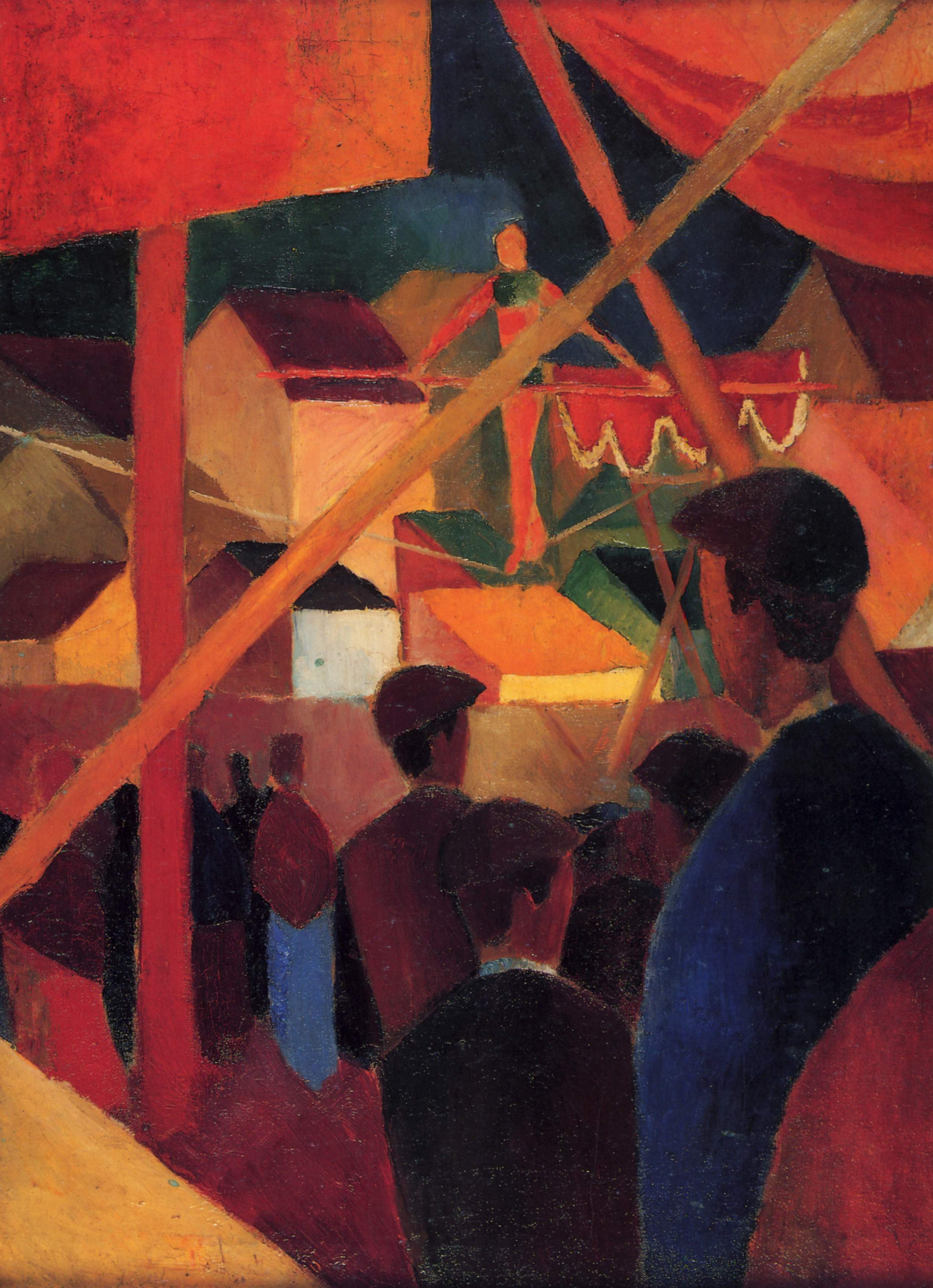
Other interpretations of the story focus on the role of the passive spectator—who, in a slightly different world, might have intervened.

Broadly speaking, the story invokes the topsy-turvy relationship between "Sein" and "Schein" (being and appearance), a mainstay of 19th-century German idealism, that Kafka likes to complicate throughout his writing. Both sentences of narration contain elements which suggest a dream state or hallucination. Although grammatically the first sentence is presented as counterfactual and the second sentence presented are factual, both describe scenarios mediated by the fallible perception of the Galeriebesucher. The 'truth' of the second version may lie only in the fact that this version reflects the Galeriebesucher's limited conscious responses to the scenario.

A common interpretation of the story posits that the first sentence describes a more truthful version of reality, evoking a noble and appropriate reaction from the young man. The young man of sentence two cries involuntarily from sadness because his body perceives the cruelty implicit in the situation. Galeriebesucher^{1} might represent the true but suppressed feelings of Galeriebesucher^{2}. A fatalist reading would emphasize the actual helplessness of Galeriebesucher^{2} as a reflection of Kafka's perceived impotence and perhaps emblematic of the futility of the human condition. Peter Heller lists the "gallery" story as an example of Kafka's (failed) "experimentation with the positive".

The Direktor is often understood a coalescence of social evil: perhaps an agent of the system of class oppression, or perhaps a domineering patriarchal father. The Kunstreiterin is generally seen as exploited: for her physical labor and for her value as a sexual commodity within a patriarchal system. The two male characters over how the Kunstreiterin is to be perceived, but her agency is limited in either case, as a victim of the cruel master (who resembles a pimp) or as a damsel in distress to be rescued by another man. Freudian readers would immediately perceive a classic Oedipal situation, in which the younger man experiences shame and frustration when an older, more powerful man (with a whip) obstructs his access to the beautiful woman. A twist on this reading proposes to explore the changes in power dynamics between the male ringmaster and the female performer.

According to common interpretations, the story poses the question of how a person's vantage point may affect their ethical choices. The power to intervene, available in the story only to Galeriebesucher^{1} who sees the circus in a sort of blurry long exposure, comes to those who can pierce the veil of ideology and understand social processes on a deeper level.

Bianca Theisen prefers to focus on the inherent ambiguity of performance, identifying the reader with the Galeriebesucher and arguing: "The ambivalence of the text's final gesture offers no clear exegesis to the incongruities and contrasts set up by the two paragraphs and reproduces the circular relationship between negation and affirmation that organizes and reorganizes a miserable reality as mere fiction and an illusionary mirage as reality." Theisen observes: "Weeping is not univocal; tears can also indicate joy." Ultimately, she argues, the spectator's tears indicate only his uncontrollable body.

Elizabeth Boa contests the 'heroic' aspects of the subjunctive world in sentence one. First, even this scenario envisions only possible action by the Galeriebesucher. Given the structural ambiguity of observation and interpretation, might every witness to atrocity behave just as passively at the weeping spectator in the story? The uncertainty alone is enough to make one weep. Boa denies that Kafka has fully pierced the ideological veil, writing: "The text purports to show how certain social interactions work: given this set of attitudes and self-understanding, that effect may result; but the attitudes and self-understanding have an unstable, experimental quality, like the young man's masculinity." What the story really shows, Boa argues, is "art-production as the obsessive circlings of sado-masochistic masculinity and of a divided self"—manifested as layers of textual ambiguity organized around the figure of an unknowable woman.

== Context ==
Franz Kafka wrote "Up in the Gallery" while living with his sister Ottla Kafka. He soon after rented his own apartment and moved out.

Kafka not only attended circuses but also read periodicals about them. The circus motif figures prominently in his writing. "Der Galerie" might refer not just to the seating for an audience, but to the cheap seats high up: the bleachers. Segregation by class of a circus audience would have been noticeable and significant to Kafka.

The captive equestrienne of "Up in the Gallery" has been compared to Kafka's self-starving "hunger artist". Kafka may have considered these performers, beleaguered unto sickness by the demands of their audience, as representative of artists in general.

== See also ==
- Ringmaster (horse show)
- Feminist film theory
- Feminism and the Oedipus complex
- Hermeneutics
