= Richard and Samuel =

Richard and Samuel is an unfinished novel by Max Brod and Franz Kafka. It was started in November 1911, and only the first chapter was written. The text with an outline of the plot and characters appeared in the May 1912 edition of Herder-Blätter, edited by Willy Haas, a close friend of both Brod and Kafka.
