= A Country Doctor (short story) =

- Short story by Franz Kafka
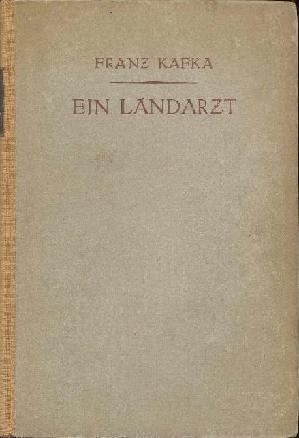
- First edition
- Original title: Ein Landarzt
- Language: German

Publication
- Publication type: Anthology
- Publisher: Kurt Wolff
- Publication date: 1919

"A Country Doctor" (German: "Ein Landarzt") is a short story written in 1917 by Franz Kafka. It "first appeared in Kurt Wolff's 1918 anthology Die Neue Dichtung (The New Literature) and then in early 1920 as the title piece in Kafka's second collection of stories". In the story, a country doctor makes an emergency visit to a sick patient on a winter night. The doctor faces absurd, surreal predicaments that pull him along and finally doom him.

== Plot ==
The plot follows a country doctor's hapless struggle to attend a sick young boy on a snowy winter's night. A series of surreal events occurs in the process, including the appearance of a mysterious groom (stablehand) in a pig shed.

It begins with the doctor having to urgently attend a sick patient in a village ten miles away, but his only horse died the night before, so his maid Rosa goes off to find another. She returns empty-handed — "Of course, who is now going to lend her his horse for such a journey?" — and the doctor expresses his frustration by kicking the door of what he thinks is his empty pig shed. A mysterious groom appears from within and supplies the doctor with two magnificent horses to pull his trap. The groom grasps Rosa, leaving two rows of red teeth marks on her cheek, when she tries to hand him a harness. The doctor scolds the groom but quickly realizes that he is in the groom's debt and climbs into the carriage. To protect Rosa from the groom, he tells the groom to travel with him, but the groom refuses, preferring to stay with the terrified Rosa, who dashes into the house and makes every effort to secure herself, although her fate is "inevitable". The doctor can do nothing to stop the groom, who, with a simple "Giddy up!" sends the horses on their way and breaks down the doctor's front door to get at Rosa.

The doctor is almost instantly transported to his sick patient's house. It is, he says, "as if the gate to my own yard opened directly onto the yard of my ill patient". After being ushered into the house by a family whose explications he does not comprehend, the doctor is quietly implored by the patient to let him die. Initially, the doctor deems the patient completely healthy and feels annoyed that his patients keep calling him at night for no reason, but, after he notices the boy's sister holding a bloody towel, he reexamines the boy and discovers a large, deep wound on his right side that is full of worms. The family and assembled guests are pleased to see the doctor at work. The horses, meanwhile, having somehow freed themselves of their straps, have opened the windows and are neighing frantically.

The doctor's thoughts keep returning to the fate of his maid, for which he blames himself. In accordance with a simple tune being sung by a school choir that has assembled outside the house, the family undresses the doctor and places him in bed alongside the patient. When the family leaves the room, the doctor assures his skeptical bed mate that the wound is not that bad, gathers his belongings, and jumps out a window and onto one of the horses. He expects to get home so soon that he does not even bother to get dressed, but the horses do not move as quickly as they did on the outgoing journey. The doctor, disgraced, finds himself and the horses "crawl[ing] slowly through the wasteland of snow like old men". He feels betrayed by his patients and his community, and the story concludes with the line "A false ring of the night bell, once answered — it can never be made right."

Skinny, not feverish, neither cold nor warm, blank-eyed, shirtless, the boy raises himself under the featherbed, puts his arms around my neck, and whispers in my ear, "Doctor, let me die."

— Excerpt from Franz Kafka's "A Country Doctor", Mark Harman translation, p. 176.

== Interpretation ==
Louis H. Leiter saw in the tale a cogent argument for existentialism:

"A Country Doctor" comments on man, who, buffeted by the scheme of things, is unable to transcend the part assigned him by the absurdity of that existence. Because he does not lack conscious knowledge of his condition, but refuses to act in the face of his portentous freedom, the doctor, an archetype of the anti-existential hero, deserves his fate. Lacking the human stuff necessary to create and structure situations, he permits himself to be manipulated by the groom, the family, and the horses; but he becomes, by submitting, a tool within the situations they create. Never, consciously, does he attempt through an overt act, until too late, to establish his own essence, to rise above any manipulative value he possesses for others. As doctor he is a thing, an object, a tool; as man he is nothing.

Psychologists at the University of California, Santa Barbara and the University of British Columbia published a report in 2009 using "A Country Doctor" as the variable in a study testing what impact reading absurdist tales has on cognitive skills. The study showed that reading the story improved test subjects' ability to find patterns. Their findings summarised that when people have to work to find consistency and meaning in a fragmented story, it increases "the cognitive mechanisms responsible for implicitly learning statistical regularities".

== Adaptations ==
- A Country Doctor (カフカ田舎医者, Kafuka: Inaka Isha) (2007) – an animated film by Kōji Yamamura
- Erik Bauersfeld adapted the story for an episode of The Black Mass radio series.
- Ein Landarzt, a one-act opera by Hans Werner Henze

== Translations ==
- Freed, Donna, trans. (2003). The Metamorphosis and Other Stories. Barnes & Noble Classics Collection. ISBN 1-59308-029-8
- Harman, Mark, ed. and trans. (2024). Selected Stories: Franz Kafka. Cambridge, Massachusetts, and London, England: The Belknap Press of Harvard University Press. ISBN 9780674737983
- Muir, Willa and Edwin, trans. (1946). Franz Kafka: The Complete Stories. Edited by Nahum N. Glatzer. New York: Schocken Books.
- Pasley, Malcolm, ed. and trans. (1992). The Transformation and Other Stories: Works Published During Kafka's Lifetime. Penguin Books.
