= Poseidon (short story) =

Short story by Franz Kafka

"Poseidon" (German: "Poseidon") is a fragment of a story by Franz Kafka, published in the German collection, Beschreibung eines Kampfes, by Max Brod, in 1936. The story was included in the collection translated into English in 1958 by Tania and James Stern, and in a collection translated into English in 2024 by Mark Harman.

The sea god Poseidon is presented here as a disgruntled manager of the waters, which he does not really know.

== History ==
In the fall of 1920, Kafka broke away from his lover Milena Jesenská and wrote a series of short prose pieces, including "The Refusal". Kafka did not publish them; his friend Max Brod titled them when he published them.

== Plot ==
Poseidon is sitting at the desk and makes calculations on the waters he has to manage. For his work, he could rely on staff, but prefers to work on his own. He does not like his work but sees no alternative.

Poseidon laments that people imagine him constantly chauffeuring the waters with his trident. Instead, he sits in the depths of the oceans, doing continuous calculations and hardly ever seeing the sea. He interrupts his "monotony only occasionally with a journey up to Jupiter, from which ... he would return mostly in a rage. So he had hardly seen the seas, merely glimpsed them during his hasty ascents to the Olympus." He is afraid that he will have to wait until the end of the world for a quiet moment and a tour of the sea.

== Form ==
The short story consists of two paragraphs. The narrative perspective is not established and shifts between the paragraphs. An anonymous narrator tells the story, while an impersonal perspective by someone superior adds ironic comments.

The second paragraph is dominated by Poseidon's dissatisfaction, but, again, he is not the narrator.
