= A Country Doctor (short story collection) =

Collection of short stories by Franz Kafka

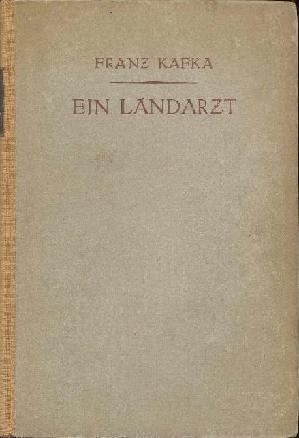
- First edition
- Author: Franz Kafka
- Original title: Ein Landarzt
- Language: German
- Genre: Short story collection
- Published: 1919 (1920) (Kurt Wolff)
- Media type: Print (hardback)
- Original text: Ein Landarzt at German Wikisource

A Country Doctor (German: Ein Landarzt) is a collection of short stories written mostly in 1917 by Franz Kafka, containing the story of the same name. Kurt Wolff published it in 1919 as the second collection of stories by Kafka, after Betrachtung (Contemplation, 1912).

Kafka dedicated the collection to his father. He often recounted to Max Brod the reaction of his father when he presented it to him: "Lay it on my nightstand." He also wrote to Brod that he did not think that his dedication of the title story to his father "could appease my father ... the roots of our antagonism are too deep".

The stories themselves have one thing in particular in common: somewhere, whether at the beginning or later in the course of the text, an unsettling moment, which is sometimes termed the "Kafka Paradox", occurs.

- Der neue Advokat (The New Advocate)
- Ein Landarzt (A Country Doctor)
- Auf der Galerie (Up in the Gallery)
- Ein altes Blatt (An Old Manuscript)
- Vor dem Gesetz (Before the Law)
- Schakale und Araber (Jackals and Arabs)
- Ein Besuch im Bergwerk (A Visit to the Mine)
- Das nächste Dorf (The Next Village)
- Eine kaiserliche Botschaft (A Message from the Emperor)
- Die Sorge des Hausvaters (The Cares of a Family Man)
- Elf Söhne (Eleven Sons)
- Ein Brudermord (A Fratricide)
- Ein Traum (A Dream)
- Ein Bericht für eine Akademie (A Report to an Academy)

Originally the short story "Der Kübelreiter" (The Bucket Rider) was to be included as well, but it was retracted by Kafka before the book was printed.
