= Advocates (short story) =

- Short story by Franz Kafka
- Original title: Fürsprecher
- Language: German

Publication
- Publication date: 1936

"Advocates" (German: Fürsprecher) is a prose piece by Franz Kafka, probably written between February 1920 and February 1921, but not published until 1936, after Kafka's death. It is a monologue describing the difficulty and the necessity of finding advocates, or people to speak for the narrator (the literal meaning of Fürsprecher).

The narrator tells of his search for advocates, constantly moving in the aisles in which an undefined roar prevails. He often meets old cumbersome women. The narrator does not know whether he is in a courthouse, but he knows he is not in the right place to find advocates. He needs them to defend him against his accusers. He tries to attract a large number of supporters from different groups of the population. The relentless search finds him moving upwards on seemingly endless stairs in a gigantic building, with the steps growing under his feet.
