= The Cares of a Family Man =

Short story by Franz Kafka

"The Cares of a Family Man" (German: "Die Sorge des Hausvaters") is a short story by Franz Kafka, originally written in German, between 1914 and 1917 about an entity called Odradek.

Odradek has drawn the attention of many philosophers and literary critics, who have all attempted to interpret its meaning; thus, there are numerous analyses of the text.

In 1919, the story appeared in Ein Landarzt. Kleine Erzählungen (A Country Doctor), a collection of Kafka's short stories published by Kurt Wolff (Munich and Leipzig).

== Translations of the Title ==
The title "The Cares of a Family Man" is the translation of Willa and Edwin Muir. The title of the story has also been translated by Malcolm Pasley as "A Problem for the Father of the Family", by J. A. Underwood as "The Householder's Concern", by Michael Hofmann as "The Worries of a Head of Household", and by Mark Harman as "The Concern of a Family Man".

== Etymology ==
The story, which is in the first-person narrative told entirely by the family man of the title, begins by discussing the etymological disparities associated with the word Odradek:

Some say the word Odradek is of Slavonic origin and try to account for it on that basis. Others again believe it to be of German origin, only influenced by Slavonic. The uncertainty of both interpretations allows one to assume with justice that neither is accurate, especially as neither of them provides an intelligent meaning of the word.

== Plot ==
The story deals with the narrator's attempt to make sense of the only additional character, Odradek, and gives a detailed description of the creature in the second paragraph:

At first glance it looks like a flat star-shaped spool for thread, and indeed it does seem to have thread wound upon it; to be sure, they are only old, broken-off bits of thread, knotted and tangled together, of the most varied sorts and colours. But it is not only a spool, for a small wooden crossbar sticks out of the middle of the star, and another small rod is joined to that at a right angle.

These details offer the reader the ability to examine and criticize the purpose and necessities of objects for things or people such as Odradek. Odradek is described as an object, yet is also given a "hypothetical humanoid appearance" when the narrator describes the object as being able to stand upright on two points of the star.

In the fourth paragraph the narrator starts to refer to Odradek as "he" rather than "it" and states that Odradek has a lingering presence in his home. "Sometimes he is not to be seen for months ... but then without fail he comes back to our house". It is discovered that Odradek can speak, another human capability.

Throughout the story, the narrator provides an extensive analysis of Odradek, attempting to emphasize how the object has taken on a life of its own, displaying lifelike qualities and traits, as well as his silent relationship with the object.

The narrator's main concern about the creature Odradek is revealed in the final paragraph:

In vain I ask myself, what will happen to him. Can he die? Everything that dies has once had a sort of aim, a sort of activity, which has worn it out; this is not the case of Odradek. Will he therefore one day tumble down the stairs before the feet of my children and my children's children, trailing a line of thread after him? It's clear he does nobody any harm; but the notion that he might even outlive me is almost painful to me.

The narrator fears that this purposeless object will outlive him. The family man, throughout the story, fears that Odradek will attack his role as the head of the family.

== Interpretations ==
=== Useless object ===
Odradek appears to represent an object with no clear purpose or apparent use. It appears not unlike an exhausted spool for thread, wound about by "old, broken-off bits of thread, knotted and tangled together, of the most varied sorts and colors". However, the text makes it explicit that there is no apparent use for the object. As such, scholars such as Samuel Rammelmeier have argued that the obscurity and uselessness of the object serves to create a foil for the narrator. He argues that the object's apparent uselessness, when seen in light of the existential dread pervading the last paragraph, can be understood as underlining the narrator's lack of purpose. This is an opinion shared by Heinz Politzer when he states that Kafka's absurdist writing emphasizes the meaninglessness of its subjects' lives. Such an interpretation can be compared to the nihilist tone of Kafka's better-known work, The Metamorphosis.

=== Critique of capitalism ===
Willi Goetschel analyzes "The Cares of a Family Man" from several perspectives. From the perspective of Marxist literary criticism the story might be a critique of capitalism in its last stage. Odradek represents commodities; it is "what is left of life once everything is reduced to materialism".

Anya Meksin agrees that this interpretation is possible from a Marxist perspective. Odradek, being made of thread for mending, represents the world of manmade practical objects separated from the human work that produced them, and the relation between the house father and Odradek represents the alienated relation between the worker and commodities he has produced. The idea that Odradek will survive the narrator and the anguish this situation causes to him can also be interpreted as the idea of commodities being inherited and transcending the worker who made them, but in such a way that the worker himself would be completely ignored.

=== Objectification of memory ===
According to Goetschel, from a Freudian approach Odradek can be seen as "the psychological return of the repressed". In Freud's theory of repression, an unacknowledged trauma surfaces as unconscious associations and neuroses, which affect thought, memory and dreams. Such an interpretation is supported by Kafka's letters and biography: in approximately 1921, he wrote a letter to Milena Jesenka in which he explains his mental disturbances in a distinctly Freudian light. Furthermore, Kafka's Letter to His Father indicates that Kafka had suffered from emotional trauma due to his childhood, which lends biographical weight to this argument.

=== Religious interpretation ===
A religious perspective opens up another interpretation of the text. Goetschel indicates that the star-shaped form of the creature might represent tradition (specifically Jewish tradition), which is passed on from generation to generation and accumulates some more bits of "thread" in each generation.

According to Meksin, Odradek represents a rupture between the world of the family man and some other transcendent realm. It is immortal, and hides in shadows carrying a message from generation to generation, and witnessing it all. Meksin goes on to indicate that the physical description of Odradek with its wooden crossbar sticks joined to that at a right angle can also remind us of crucifixion.

While Rammelmeier argues against clean-cut metaphorical interpretations of the story, he acknowledges that Odradek possesses some supernatural qualities, such as disappearance and reappearance. He states that these supernatural qualities are made all the more prominent by the text's otherwise objective or sachlich style. He adds that, due to the text's stylistic dryness, a reader who reads the story through an ideological lens may find evidence for any interpretation they may wish to hold. Nevertheless, the story's last passage and its concern with "my children's children", the object's apparent lack of purpose, the ephemeral qualities of Odradek, the religious symbolism of the transverse rod and the star shape, and the mention of death in the last line of the story provide textual evidence for associations of Odradek to religion, or at least cultural traditions.

=== Odradek as complement ===
In The Parallax View, Slavoj Žižek emphasizes that Odradek "once had some sort of intelligible shape and is now only a broken-down remnant," and as such it should be part of a whole. The relation between the narrator (a family man, a father) and the creature could be this whole: Odradek might be the complement of the narrator, who would also be broken down, with part of him transferred into Odradek. That is why Odradek is something a family man has to care for.

=== Kafka's wider reading ===
Karen Leeder, in a review of Kafkas Werkstatt: Der Schriftsteller bei der Arbeit, by Andreas Kilcher, writes that Kilcher views "the story in light of Kafka's wider reading, offering four contexts", based on readings of Freud, Marx, Zionist thought, and "spiritualism and theosophy".
