= The Stoker =

- Short story by Franz Kafka
- Original title: Der Heizer
- Language: German

Publication
- Published in: Amerika (1927)
- Publication date: 1913

"The Stoker" (original German: "Der Heizer") is a short story by Franz Kafka. Kafka wrote it as the first chapter of an uncompleted novel that Max Brod titled and published as Amerika and that has subsequently been translated as The Man Who Disappeared (Amerika), as Amerika: The Missing Person, as Lost in America, and as The Man Who Disappeared (America). Kafka abandoned the novel in 1913 and published "The Stoker" alone as a pamphlet later that year. Since his death, it has usually been published as the opening chapter of Amerika.

== Plot ==
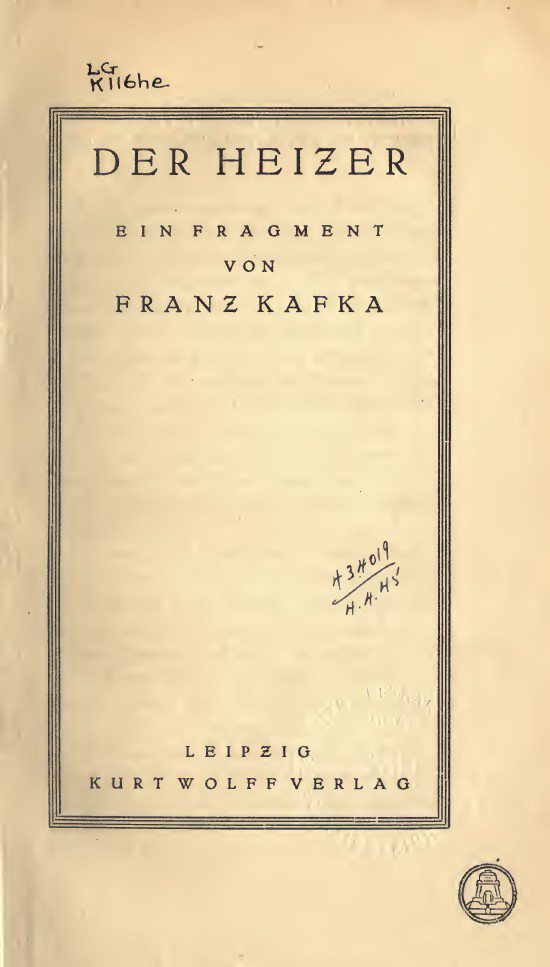
Heizer

Sixteen-year-old Karl Rossmann arrives in New York Harbor on a slow-moving ship. He has been sent to America by his parents "because a maid had seduced him and then had his child." As he is about to go ashore, he remembers that he has left his umbrella below deck, so he asks a young man with whom he had been briefly acquainted during the voyage to watch his trunk while he runs to get it.

Karl gets lost in the corridors and begins pounding on a door. A man lets him in and, since the man convinces Karl that it will be easier to find his umbrella and trunk (if they have not been stolen, that is) after all of the passengers have disembarked, the two start to talk. The man explains he is a stoker on the ship, but he is about to be fired because the chief engineer, a Romanian named Schubal, has a preference for Romanians, even though the ship, like the Stoker, is German. He says this must be the reason he is being let go because he has worked on many ships and, until now, has always been praised for his hard work.

Karl sympathizes with the Stoker's story and accompanies him when he goes to collect his money and complain one more time about Schubal to the Chief Purser. They are admitted to the Purser's office, but are quickly told to leave when the Purser indicates he is too busy to listen to the Stoker. At this, Karl goes over to the Purser's desk, grabbing the attention of everyone present, including the Captain of the ship, who has been talking with a civilian. He explains that he believes the Stoker has been done an injustice and should be given an opportunity to air his grievances.

The Captain steps forward and asks the Stoker to speak. The Stoker begins describing the details of his case, but in a random and disorganized way. Karl notices the Stoker gradually losing his audience and eventually interrupts to tell him to be more organized and avoid unnecessary details. The man who had been talking with the Captain takes the break in the Stoker's testimony as an opportunity to ask for Karl's name, but just then Schubal comes in, saying he is ready to refute any charges laid against him with documents and witnesses. The Captain cuts off Schubal and invites Mr. Jakob, the man with whom he had been talking, to repeat his question. Karl, who had been feeling energized and wished his parents could see him arguing for a just cause in such distinguished company, gives his name and is recognized by Mr. Jakob as being his nephew. As it so happens, Karl's Uncle Jakob Bendelmayer (who in America has become Senator Edward Jakob) had been informed of Karl's trip via a letter sent to him by the maid who had earlier seduced Karl, so he met the ship on its arrival in America to try to find his nephew.

Everyone except for Karl forgets about the Stoker while the Senator tells an abbreviated version of his story. Afterward, all present, including Schubal, congratulate Karl and the Senator on finding each other. Karl tries to use his perceived newly found influence to gather some sympathy for the Stoker's cause, but the Senator explains that it is really up to the captain to decide what happens next. Not seeing anything else he can do to help, but noticing the Stoker seems to have lost all hope for a satisfactory resolution to his situation, Karl asks the Stoker to promise he will defend himself in Karl's absence. Karl is led away by the Senator to a boat the Captain has arranged to ferry them to shore. As he is climbing into the boat, Karl begins to weep.

Karl looks at the windows of the Purser's office while he is being rowed away. He can see Schubal's witnesses, who cheerily wave to his small boat. Switching his gaze to the Senator, Karl wonders if, to him, his uncle could ever replace the Stoker.

== Publication ==
Having stopped work on Amerika in January 1913, in March Kafka sent the publisher Kurt Wolff a copy of The Metamorphosis and tried to convince him to publish it along with The Stoker and The Judgment as a book called The Sons. Instead, The Stoker was published in May as a 48-page book in a run of Wolff's usual 1000 copies. It was presented as Volume 3 of Wolff's Day of Judgment series.
