= Franz Kafka's diaries =

First single volume edition (publ. Peregrine Books, UK 1964)

The diaries of Franz Kafka, written between 1910 and 1923, include casual observations, details of daily life, reflections on philosophical ideas, accounts of dreams, and ideas for stories. Kafka’s diaries offer a detailed view of the writer's thoughts and feelings, as well as some of his most famous and quotable statements.

== Overview ==
Kafka began keeping the diaries at the age of 25, as an attempt to provoke his stalled creativity, and kept writing in them until 1923, a year before his death. These diaries were in the background all through the composition of Kafka's major works and many of them are discussed and analyzed in detail.

The diaries offer an image of a profoundly depressed man, isolated from friends and family, involved in a series of failed relationships, and constantly sick. While this is certainly part of Kafka's character, it is typical for a private journal, not meant for publication, to express more of the writer's anxieties and worries. Yet, according to Frances Wilson, the diaries "are often very funny". She writes, "the diaries are made up of false starts, stray thoughts, self-doubts, internal dialogues, dreams, doodles, insertions, marginalia, aphorisms, drafts of letters, drafts of stories, self-reflections, reconstructions, character sketches, and scenes from family life that ... are often very funny".

Kafka left instructions to his friend Max Brod to burn his diaries without reading them after his death. Brod did not respect these wishes because he felt Kafka's writing held immense literary value and signed a contract for publication within two months. Initially published in 1948 and 1949 by Schocken Books in two volumes, The Diaries of Franz Kafka 1910-1913 and The Diaries of Franz Kafka 1914-1923, they were brought together in a single volume in 1964.

In 2023, the first unexpurgated edition of Kafka’s diaries was published in English, "more than three decades after this complete text appeared in German. The sole previous English edition, with Max Brod’s edits, was issued in the late 1940s".
