= Eleven Sons =

Short story by Franz Kafka

"Eleven Sons" (German: "Elf Söhne") is a short story by Franz Kafka.

The story begins with a father's declaration: "I have eleven sons." He then goes on to describe each one of them in detail. Kafka told Max Brod: "The eleven sons are quite simply eleven stories I am working on this very moment." The story was written between 1914 and 1917. In 1919, it appeared in Ein Landarzt. Kleine Erzählungen (A Country Doctor), a collection of Kafka's short stories published by Kurt Wolff in Munich and Leipzig.
