= An Old Manuscript =

Short story by Franz Kafka

- Short story by Franz Kafka

Text available at German Wikisource
- Original title: Ein altes Blatt
- Language: German

Publication
- Publisher: Kurt Wolff

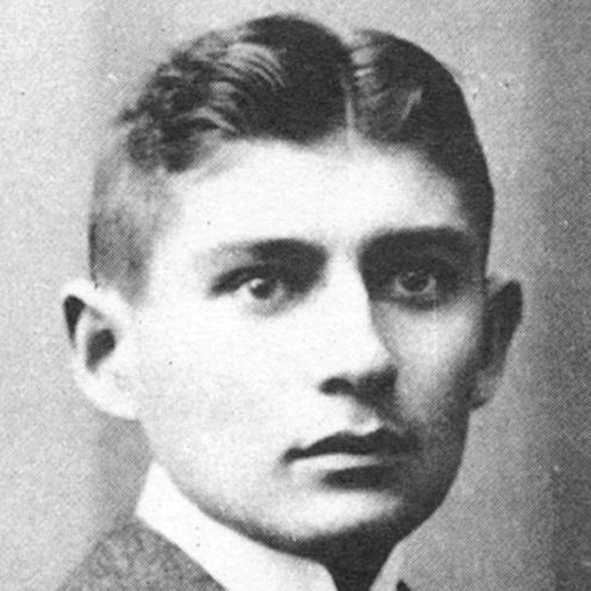
Kafka in 1906

"An Old Manuscript" (German: "Ein altes Blatt"), alternatively translated as "An Old Leaf", is a short story by Franz Kafka. It was written in 1919 and published in the collection Ein Landarzt (A Country Doctor).

== Plot summary ==
The story begins as a shoemaker begins to open his shop at daybreak. He notices that a large group of nomads from the North have filled the town square. The nomads show no signs of culture, and soon transform the city into "a veritable sty". They show no respect for the townspeople and take everything they want from the stores without making any sort of payment. The Emperor appears at one of the palace windows and looks on as the nomads take control of the city, but he is unable to do anything. The shoemaker concludes: "The salvation of our fatherland is left to us craftmen and tradespeople, but we are not equal to such a task, nor indeed have we ever claimed to be capable of it. This is a misunderstanding, and it is proving the ruin of us."
