= Dearest Father: Stories and Other Writings =

Story collection by Franz Kafka

- First edition cover
- Author: Franz Kafka
- Translator: Ernst Kaiser and Eithne Wilkins
- Publisher: Schocken Books
- Publication date: 1954

Dearest Father: Stories and Other Writings is a collection of writings by Franz Kafka translated by Ernst Kaiser and Eithne Wilkins with notes by Max Brod (Schocken Books, 1954). The title derives from Kafka's Letter to His Father, which begins with this salutation. In 2007, a translation by Howard Colyer, titled Letter to My Father, was published by lulu.com. A translation of Dearest Father, with notes and an introduction by its translators, Hannah and Richard Stokes, was published in 2008.

== Contents ==
- Wedding Preparations in the Country
- Reflections on Sin, Suffering, Hope, and the True Way
- The Blue Octavo Notebooks
- Letter to His Father
- Fragments from Notebooks and Loose Pages
- Paralipomena (text variants and supplementary literary material)
