= Letter to His Father =

1919 letter by Franz Kafka to his father

1966 bilingual edition

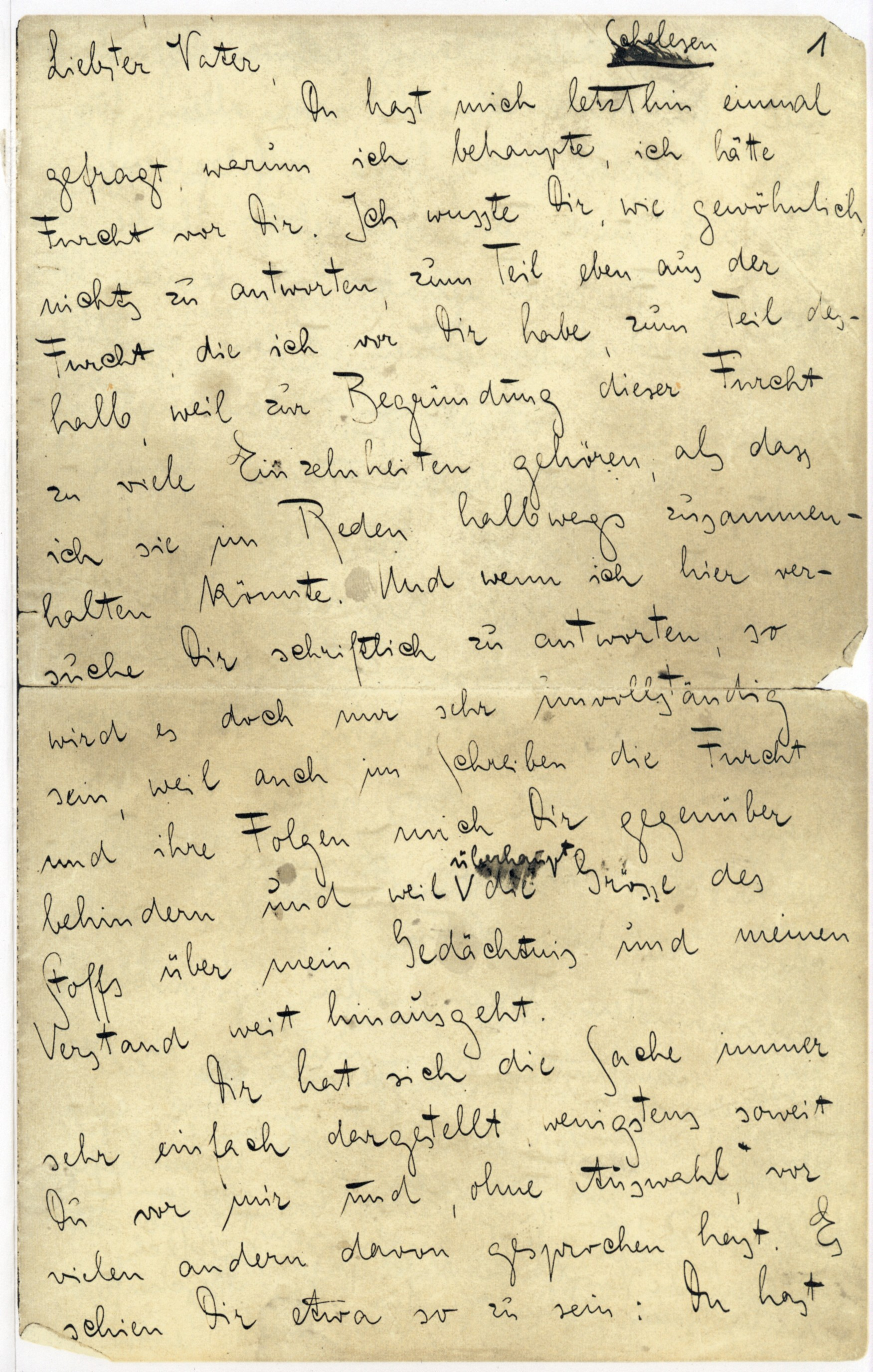
First page of Kafka's manuscript

Letter to His Father (German: Brief an den Vater) is the name given to a letter Franz Kafka wrote to his father, Hermann, in November 1919.

== History ==
According to Max Brod, Kafka gave the letter to his mother to deliver to his father but she never did. The original letter, 45 pages long, was typewritten by Kafka and corrected by hand. Two and a half additional pages were written by hand.

In 1954, the letter, translated into English by Ernst Kaiser and Eithne Wilkins, was published by Schocken Books in Dearest Father: Stories and Other Writings. In 1966, Schocken Books published the same translation in a bilingual edition.

A new translation by Hannah and Richard Stokes was published by Oneworld Classics in 2008 under the title Dearest Father.

Extracts from the letter, translated by Sophie Prombaum, are included in A Franz Kafka Miscellany.

The letter begins as follows: "Dearest Father, You asked me recently why I maintain that I am afraid of you. As usual, I was unable to think of any answer to your question, partly for the very reason that I am afraid of you, and partly because an explanation of the grounds for this fear would mean going into far more details than I could even approximately keep in mind while talking. And if I now try to give you an answer in writing, it will still be very incomplete."

== Editions ==
- Letter to the Father. Bilingual edition. New York: Schocken Books, 1966. Translated by Ernst Kaiser and Eithne Wilkins.
- Dearest Father. Oneworld Classics, 2008. ISBN 978-1-84749-025-4. Translated by Hannah and Richard Stokes.
- Letter to the Father. Prague: Vitalis Verlag, 1998. Translated by Karen Reppin. Reissued in 2013 with drawings by Franz Kafka. ISBN 978-80-7253-344-2.

The following collections include Kafka's Letter to His Father (Kaiser and Wilkins translation):

- Dearest Father. Stories and Other Writings. New York: Schocken Books, 1954.
- The Sons. New York: Schocken Books, 1989.
