= James Stern (writer) =

James Stern (26 December 1904 – 22 November 1993) was an Anglo-Irish writer of short stories and non-fiction. He was also known for his extensive letter writing and being a friend of the famous, Malcolm Cowley once remarked to Stern, "My God, you've known everybody, his wife, his boyfriend, and his natural issue!"

== Life and career ==
The son of a British cavalry officer of Jewish descent and an Anglo-Irish Protestant mother, Stern was born in County Meath, Ireland, and educated at Wixenford School in the south of England. After working in Southern Rhodesia as a young man, he worked for his family's bank in London and Germany, which he loathed. He escaped to Paris, where he met his German wife Tania Kurella, whom he married in 1935. They moved to New York in 1939, returned to England in the early 1950s and in 1961 moved to Hatch Manor, in Wiltshire.

His fiction includes The Heartless Land (1932); Something Wrong (1938); The Man who was Loved (1952); The Stories of James Stern (1969) and some unpublished family memoirs A Silver Spoon.

The Hidden Damage (1947), his most frequently re-printed book, was his account of his work in Germany with the U. S. Strategic Bombing Survey in 1945, where he served along with W. H. Auden.

In the 1950s he wrote many book reviews for the New York Times and the New Republic, among others. He famously wrote a satirical review of J. D. Salinger's Catcher in the Rye in the New York Times entitled "Aw, the World's a Crumby Place".

He had many friends with whom he kept up a lifelong correspondence, preserved in the James Stern archive at the British Library. Among them were Auden, Christopher Isherwood, Brian Howard, Djuna Barnes, Samuel Beckett and Arthur Miller, whose A View from the Bridge was dedicated to Stern.

He collaborated with his wife Tania on many translations from German.
