= Josephine the Singer, or the Mouse Folk =

"Josephine, the Singer or the Mouse Folk"
- Short story by Franz Kafka
- Original title: Josefine, die Sängerin oder Das Volk der Mäuse
- Translator: Clement Greenberg (1942); Willa and Edwin Muir (1948)
- Country: Czechoslovakia
- Language: German
- Genre: Short story

Publication
- Published in: Prager Presse
- Publication type: periodical
- Publication date: 1924
- Published in English: 1942

"Josephine the Singer, or the Mouse Folk" (German: "Josefine, die Sängerin oder Das Volk der Mäuse"), also translated as "Josephine, the Singer, or The Mouse People", is the last short story written by Franz Kafka. It deals with the relationship between an artist and her audience. The story was included in the collection A Hunger Artist (Ein Hungerkünstler) published by Verlag Die Schmiede soon after Kafka's death.

== Plot ==
Josephine is a rarity among the mouse people, for she has the innate ability to sing, which no others in the community have displayed in recent history. Although they are not a musical people and some question Josephine's ability, while others adore her and consider her a communal treasure, all of the mouse people gather round to listen whenever Josephine starts to sing and appreciate her performances as something that helps them tolerate their unusually hardworking lives.

Sometimes I have the impression that our people sees its relationship with Josephine rather like this: that she, this fragile, vulnerable, somehow distinguished creature, in her opinion distinguished by her song, has been entrusted to us and that we must look after her; the reason for this is not clear to anyone, only the fact seems to be established. But what has been entrusted to one's care one does not laugh at; to do so would be a breach of duty; the utmost spite that the most spiteful amongst us can vent on Josephine is when they sometimes say: "When we see Josephine it is no laughing matter."

The narrator begins by asserting that whoever has not heard Josephine sing does not know the true power of music, but, upon reflection, he questions if Josephine even sings, or simply whistles, which all the mice people can do, and indeed do regularly. He says there is really nothing particularly noteworthy about her voice taken by itself, except perhaps its fragility, but that there must be something special about Josephine, since seeing her perform makes everyone forget, at least temporarily, any criticisms they may have about her; he wonders if her effect may come from making a spectacle of an everyday thing, in which case her average voice could be an asset. After some further refining of his estimation of Josephine and what she provides to the community, the narrator decides that what is held so dearly by the mouse people is not her 'ability', but the opportunity to gather and reflect in silence that her performances provide. They value these gatherings the most when times are the hardest, and Josephine remains influential in the community even though her performances sometimes attract the attention of the many enemies of the mouse people and lead to an attack from which she is always rushed to safety.

There are regular attempts made by Josephine to get the community of mouse people to allow her to stop her regular work so she can focus on her 'singing', though the narrator thinks what she is actually looking for is public recognition of the value of her art. She starts by arguing that she could sing even better if she had time to recuperate between performances, but the community ignores her pleas, so she begins to shorten her performances and feign injuries, but no one except for her supporters takes much notice. Eventually, Josephine disappears. She is initially missed and looked for, but the narrator comments that, in the end, she has only hurt herself by running away, since the mouse people were able to survive before she was alive and will now go on without her, at first with only their memories of her songs, and later without even those.

So perhaps we shall not miss so very much after all, while Josephine, for her part, delivered from earthly afflictions, which however to her mind are the privilege of chosen spirits, will happily lose herself in the countless throng of the heroes of our people, and soon, since we pursue no history, be accorded the heightened relief of being forgotten along with all her brethren.

It is of note that the mouse people are not ever described as such within the story. It is uncertain if they are actually mice. Many aspects of them and their lives are mouselike (that danger is always imminent and enemies many, the terrain they live in, that they are so very hardworking and practical, the practice of their children being turned out from their families into the wider community very shortly after birth, that they keep no written records, etc). They are described by the narrator, one of their number, as, when Josephine begins to sing, falling "quiet as mice"—aside from the title, this is the only time that mice are referred to. It is probable that Kafka intended the issue to be left up to our own judgment, the suggestion playfully bandied about, but no explicit answer given. Either way, whether they really are mice is of little importance to our understanding of the story, while the necessity for the idea to be in the reader's mind is central to the reading experience.

== Themes ==
=== The role of the artist in society ===
There appears to be the irony of critique here, of both the artist and the society, in their failed ability to co-operate. The artist demands too much, failing to recognize the asceticism or extra burden that has to be placed somewhere, simply by her having her role and investing time and energy into it. Society fails to understand what her value is. Although they understand it intuitively, they never use it to search for and discover the end for which they are living. And so they remain at the level of brute survival, making them mouse-like, and not so very human.

=== Family ===
Josephine the singer is part of the mouse people family. They love her, protect her and think she is vitally important to the community.

=== Solitude ===
Josephine the singer suffers in the mouse community, for she is alone in her talent and mindset. Because she sings for the rest of the mice, she is looked upon as different—for better or for worse. When she eventually disappears, people soon forget her.

== Use in philosophy ==
Austrian philosopher Gerald Raunig [de] uses "Josephine" as a frame story in his book Factories of Knowledge, Industries of Creativity to critique the factory-like aspects of the university and the industrial characteristics of the arts. In Raunig's book, the relationship between Josephine's singing and the daily life of the mouse folk entails both deterritorialization and reterritorialization, concepts found in the work of philosophers Deleuze and Guattari. Specifically, the allure of Josephine's song is a concentrating, reterritorializing force, while the daily life of the mouse folk involves constant movement or deterritorialization.

== Adaptations ==
The story was adapted by Michael McClure into a play, with the altered title of Josephine the Mouse Singer. It won an Obie Award for Best Play of the Year. Chilean author Roberto Bolaño use it as an inspiration for "Police Rat", the third short story of his book The Insufferable Gaucho (2003).

In 2014, Tangerine Dream produced an EP interpretation. The band Consolidated included a song entitled "Josephine the Singer" on their debut album The Myth of Rock (1990). The song dealt with themes similar to those in the story.

In 2026, the story was adapted by Greek composer Kharálampos Goyós and stage director Savvas Stroumpos into a new music theatre piece. It was commissioned by and played at the Greek National Opera Alternative Stage.

== Collections that include "Josefine" ==
- Kafka, Franz (1946). The Complete Stories, trans. Willa and Edwin Muir. New York: Schocken Books.
- Kafka, Franz (1981). Stories 1904–1924, trans. J. A. Underwood. London: Abacus. ISBN 0 349 10659 2.
- Kafka, Franz (1992). The Transformation and Other Stories, trans. Malcolm Pasley. London: Penguin Books.
- Kafka, Franz (1996). The Metamorphosis and Other Stories, trans. Donna Freed. New York: Barnes & Noble. ISBN 1-56619-969-7.
- Kafka, Franz (1996). The Hunger Artist, trans. Kevin Blahut. Prague: Twisted Spoon Press. ISBN 80-902171-1-7.
