= The Refusal =

Short story by Franz Kafka

"The Refusal" (German: "Die Abweisung"), also known as "Unser Städtchen liegt …", is a short story by Franz Kafka. Written in the autumn of 1920, it was not published in Kafka's lifetime.

== Overview ==
The story of "Die Abweisung" involves the narration of a young boy living in a small town that is fairly distanced from its capital. The boy reflects on how the town's inhabitants humbly submit to orders issued by the capital and are led by the tax-collector, a man with the rank of colonel. The boy goes into great detail describing the soldiers that uphold the tax-collectors law, and how they appear inhuman to the public and seem unable to speak their language. In times of crisis, the town always appeals to the colonel for government aid, and if it is anything serious, it is always refused. The final paragraph describes the narrator's observation that it is due to this situation that '...young people roughly between seventeen and twenty,' begin to feel discontent and find revolutionary ideas because they are incapable of foreseeing the consequences."
