= Before the Law =

- Short story by Franz Kafka
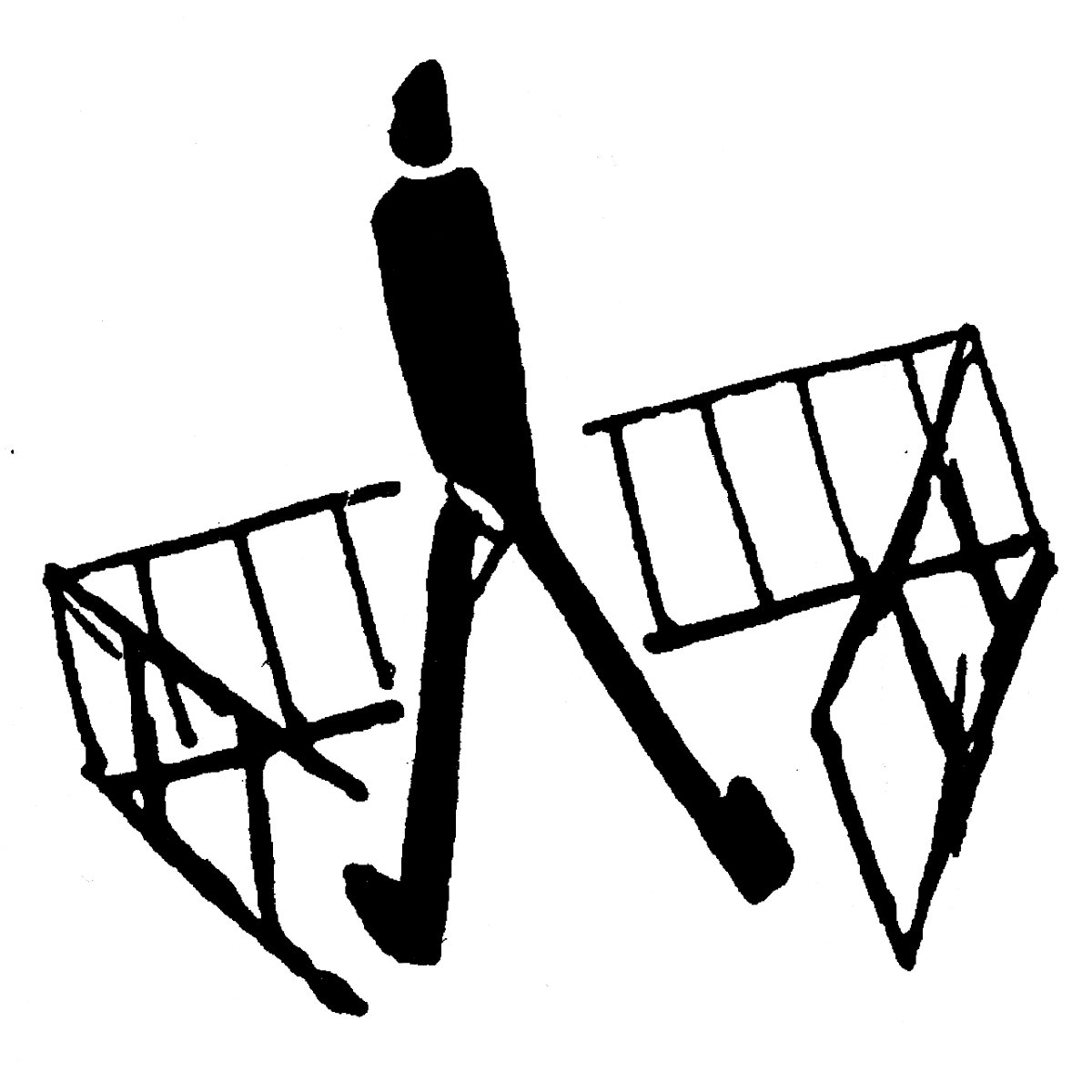
- "Man Behind Bars" by Kafka
- Original title: Vor dem Gesetz
- Language: German

Publication
- Published in: Selbstwehr (1915); Ein Landarzt (1919); Der Process (1925)
- Publisher: Kurt Wolff (1919)
- Publication date: 1915

"Before the Law" (German: "Vor dem Gesetz") is a short story by Czech writer Franz Kafka. It was printed twice during Kafka's life, but is best known as an embedded narrative in the posthumously published novel The Trial (German: Der Prozess). In the novel, "Before the Law" is delivered as a parable by a priest who stands in judgement over the protagonist’s case. The tale is offered as an allegorical explanation of Joseph K.’s guilt. Given that the precise nature of K.’s crime has never been explained to him by the court, the parable is offered in place of naming the crime of which he has been accused or as a substitute for an outline of the charges stacked against him.

== Plot summary ==
=== "Before the Law" ===
A man from the country seeks "the law" and wishes to gain entry to it through an open doorway, but the doorkeeper tells the man that he cannot go through at the present time. The man asks if he can ever go through, and the doorkeeper says it is possible "but not now (jetzt aber nicht)". The man waits by the door for years, bribing the doorkeeper with everything he has. The doorkeeper accepts the bribes, but tells the man he only accepts them "so that you do not think you have left anything undone". The man does not attempt to gain entry by force, but waits at the doorway until he is about to die. Right before his death, he asks the doorkeeper why, even though everyone seeks the law, no one else has come in all the years he has been there. The doorkeeper answers, "No one else could ever be admitted here, since this gate was made only for you. I am now going to shut it."

=== In The Trial ===
Josef K has to show an important client from Italy around a cathedral. The client does not show up, but just as K is leaving the cathedral, the priest calls out K's name, although K has never met the priest. The priest reveals that he is a court employee, and he tells K the story (Before the Law), prefacing it by saying it is from "the opening paragraphs [introductory] to the Law". The priest and K then discuss interpretations of the story before K leaves the cathedral.

== Publication ==
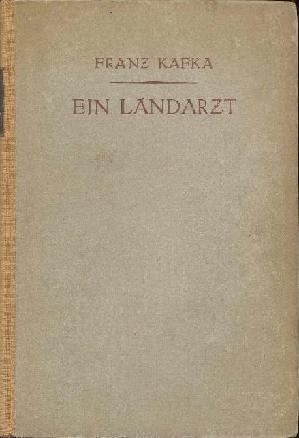
Ein Landarzt, first edition

"Before the Law" was published twice in Kafka's lifetime, first in the 1915 New Year's edition of the independent Jewish weekly Selbstwehr, then in 1919 as part of the collection Ein Landarzt (A Country Doctor). The Trial, however, was not published until 1925, after Kafka's death.

== References in other works ==
The parable is referenced and reworked in the penultimate chapter of J. M. Coetzee's novel Elizabeth Costello (2003).

Jacques Derrida's essay of the same title examines the meta-fictional aspects of the structure and content of Kafka's fable, such as the placing of the title before the body of the text and also within the first line of the text itself. Derrida incorporates Immanuel Kant's notion of the categorical imperative as well as Freudian psychoanalysis in his reading of Kafka's fable.

The 1984 fantasy film The NeverEnding Story utilizes a similar literary device as the story, of gates with successively more fearsome guards.

The 1990 Robert Anton Wilson book Quantum Psychology contains a parable about Before the Law.

The 1985 Martin Scorsese film After Hours features a scene which parodies this parable.

The post-rock band Long Distance Calling uses the spoken animated introduction sequence from the Orson Welles film adaptation of The Trial in the track "Fire in the Mountain" from their 2007 album Satellite Bay.

American composer Arnold Rosner created "Parable of the Law", a work for baritone singer and orchestra, based on Kafka's parable.

Giorgio Agamben references the parable in his book, Homo Sacer: Sovereign Power and Bare Life.

Mandy Patinkin's character references the parable in an episode of The Good Fight.
