= A Dream (short story) =

Short story by Franz Kafka

"A Dream" (German: "Ein Traum") is a short story by Franz Kafka. The narrator describes a dream in which Joseph K. is walking through a cemetery. There are tombstones around him, and the setting is typically misty and dim. Soon he sees someone carving a name on a stone, and as he approaches he notices that it is his own name.

Kafka is known to have been fascinated by dreams, which he felt held great power, both creatively and emotionally.
