= The Judgment =

- Short story by Franz Kafka
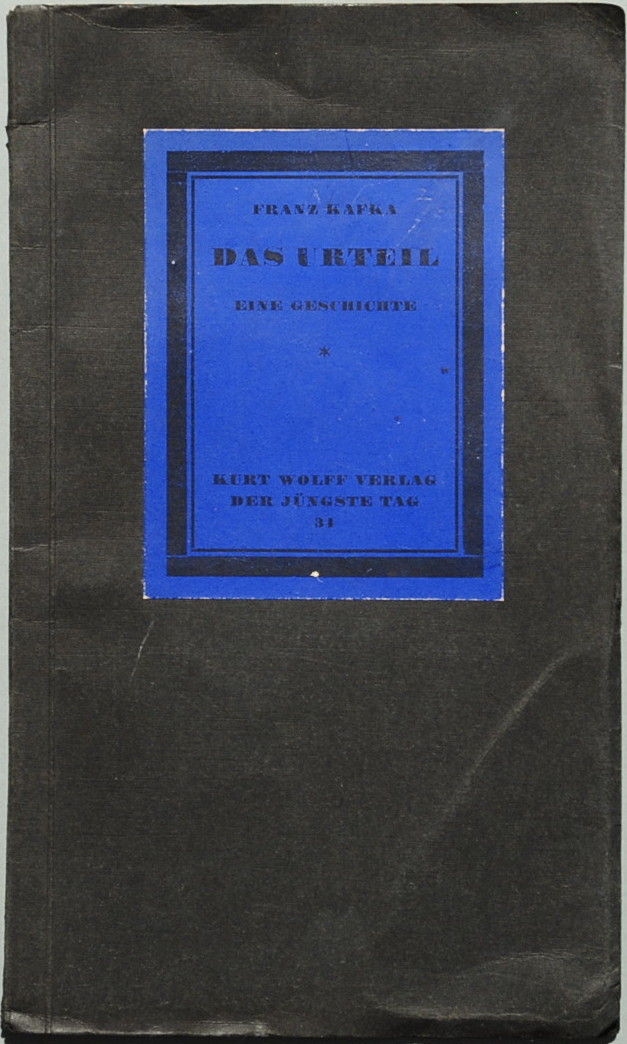
- Cover of the Kurt Wolff edition in 1916
- Original title: Das Urteil
- Country: Austria-Hungary
- Language: German

Publication
- Published in: Arkadia
- Publisher: Max Brod
- Publication date: 1913

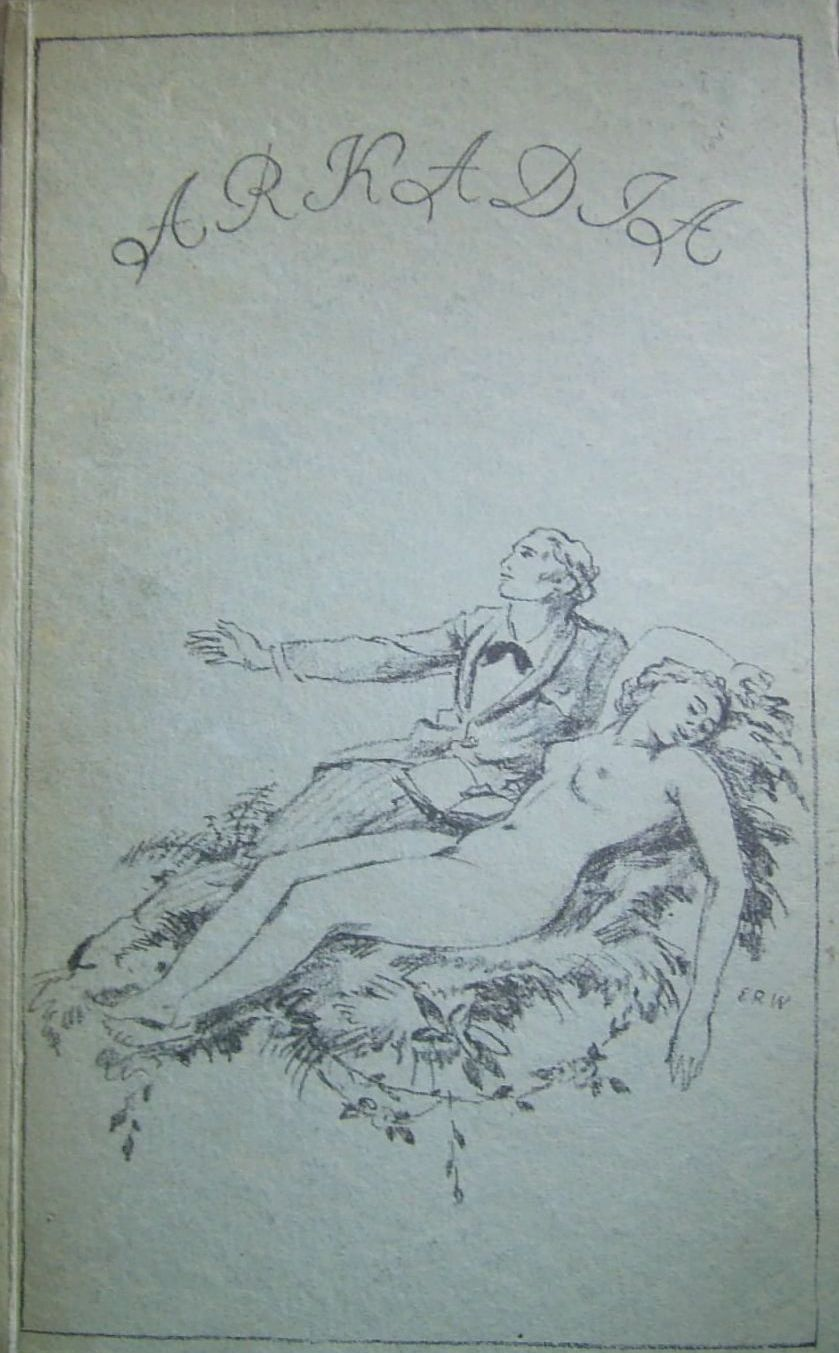
Arkadia of 1913, first print

"The Judgment" (German: "Das Urteil"), also translated "The Verdict", is a short story written by Franz Kafka in 1912, concerning the relationship between a man and his father.

== Plot summary ==
The story begins with a young merchant, Georg Bendemann, sitting in his room writing a letter to his dear friend in Russia, who had left their hometown some years previously to set up a business that, though initially successful, is now failing. Georg is writing to tell his friend, amongst other things, that he is engaged to marry Frieda Brandenfeld, a girl from a well-to-do family.

Georg breaks out of his reverie and decides to check on his father. Though quite ill, Georg's father appears huge. Georg informs his father that he has just written a letter to his friend, updating him on his upcoming marriage. His father questions the existence of the friend in Russia, at which point Georg changes the subject. Georg's father accuses him of deceiving him about the happenings of the business. He claims the death of his wife (Georg's mother) hit him harder than it did Georg.

Georg insists on having his father lie down in bed for a while. Because of this, Georg's father claims his son wants him dead. Moreover, he admits to knowing his son's friend, and, in fact, to having been carrying on a correspondence with him concurrently with Georg's. He claims to have swayed the friend's loyalty from Georg to himself, and that the friend reads the father's letters, and disposes of Georg's without reading them. He makes Georg feel terrible, suggesting that Georg has ignored his friend ever since he moved away to Russia. The father does not appreciate Georg's love and care, maintaining he can take care of himself. Georg shrinks back into a corner, scared of his father and his harsh words.

Georg's father accuses him of being selfish and finally sentences him to "death by drowning". Georg feels himself pushed from the room. He runs from his home to a bridge over a stretch of water. He swings himself over the railing and plunges, apparently to his death.

== Context ==
Franz Kafka wrote "The Judgment" ("Das Urteil") at the age of 29. At this point in his life, Kafka had finished his studies of law at the Karl-Ferdinands-Universität of Prague five years earlier and had worked at various jobs, including working for an insurance company and starting an asbestos factory with his brother-in-law, Karl Hermann.

Kafka wrote "The Judgment" in a single sitting on September 22, 1912. In later writings, he described the creative outburst of "The Judgment" as "the total opening of body and soul," saying that "the story evolved as a true birth, covered with filth and slime." Kafka viewed the work as "one of his most successful and perfect literary creations," which he was able to write in a "semi-unconscious state of mind." Kafka was incredibly enthusiastic after the work, and talked to his good friend, Max Brod, who edited and published much of his work. "The Judgment" was published in 1913 in the literary yearbook Arkadia. The story was dedicated "to Miss Felice Bauer" whom he met just before he wrote it, and in subsequent editions simply "for F.". Brod noted in his biography that the name of the main character, Georg Bendemann, alludes to Kafka (Franz has as many letters as Georg; Bende sounds similar to Kafka) and the name of the fiancée alludes to Felice (they have the same initials; Frieda as many letters as Felice; "Branden" may refer to Brandenburg around Berlin where Felice lived; "feld" (field) is related to "Bauer" (farmer)).

The work has several key inspirations that can be traced to events around the time it was created. While Kafka was running his business, he was troubled because the time required for this job limited his literary creativity. This conflict inspired the character Georg Bendemann, the protagonist of "The Judgment".

== Interpretation ==
Interpretations of Kafka's short story range from simple parallelism between the lives of Georg and Kafka to more complex views concerning the notion of judgment itself. Heinz Politzer, for example, views the story as a means through which Kafka explored his thoughts about his romance with Felice Bauer, citing as evidence the impending marriages Georg and Kafka held in common. He argues that the severed relationship between Georg and his friend represented the bachelorhood that Georg, and therefore Kafka, would soon have to give up.

Herbert Tauber, on the other hand, viewed the story as a commentary on the conflict between two separate worlds, shown through the conflict between father and son. The world of the son is a world of "vital existence in which probability and reservation rule" and that of the father is a world "in which every step has an incalculable importance because it is taken under the horizon of an absolute summons to the road".

Meanwhile, Russell Berman sees the story as a discourse on the nature of judgment in general, recognizing its depiction in the story as weak and illogical, yet simultaneously necessary. He also bemoans such a state of society as was suggested in the story that would foster degraded forms of writing and, more hauntingly, nurture extreme willingness to conform to orders without concern for consequences. Berman additionally points out that Georg's need to rationalize why he does not want to invite his estranged friend to his wedding is a result of concerns he has pushed out of sight, but nevertheless still holds. He says Kafka shares this methodology of exploring the human psyche by analyzing the motivations behind actions and thoughts with the famed thinkers Friedrich Nietzsche and Sigmund Freud.

In the story, the exiled friend in Russia exerts considerable power over the other characters—Georg, his father, and his fiancée, Frieda. In his diaries, Kafka wrote that the friend is the strongest connection between Georg and his father, for it is through this link that his father is able to reassert himself as paterfamilias and his son's enemy and that Georg is able to submissively accept him as such. Kafka goes on to relate that the fiancée exists, in a tangential sense, only because of the father-son bond that the absent exile creates.

Erwin R. Steinberg writes, "An understanding of the Day of Atonement is vital to the understanding of 'The Judgment.'"

== Translation ==
A virtually insurmountable problem facing the translator is how to deal with the author's intentional use of ambiguous terms or of words that have several meanings. An example is Kafka's use of the German noun Verkehr in the final sentence of the story. 'Verkehr' can mean either traffic or intercourse in both the social or sexual sense. The sentence can be translated as: "At this moment an unending stream of traffic was just going over the bridge." What gives added weight to the obvious double meaning of Verkehr is Kafka's confession to his friend and biographer Max Brod that when he wrote that final line, he was thinking of "a violent ejaculation."

== Publications ==
- Max Brod. Das Urteil. Eine Geschichte von Franz Kafka. Kurt Wolff, ed. Arkadia. Ein Jahrbuch für Dichtkunst. Leipzig 1913.
- Paul Raabe, ed. Franz Kafka. Sämtliche Erzählungen. S. Fischer Verlag, Frankfurt am Main/Hamburg 1970. ISBN 3-596-21078-X.
- Roger Herms, ed. Franz Kafka. Die Erzählungen. S. Fischer Verlag, 1997. ISBN 3-596-13270-3.
- Wolf Kittler, Hans-Gerd Koch, Gerhard Neumann, eds. Franz Kafka: Drucke zu Lebzeiten. S. Fischer Verlag. 1996, S. 41–61.
- Franz Kafka: Das Urteil. Illustrations by Karel Hruška. Vitalis 2005. ISBN 3-89919-087-4.

== See also ==
- The Judgement, English translation by Ian Johnston.
