= The Great Wall of China (short story) =

- Short story by Franz Kafka
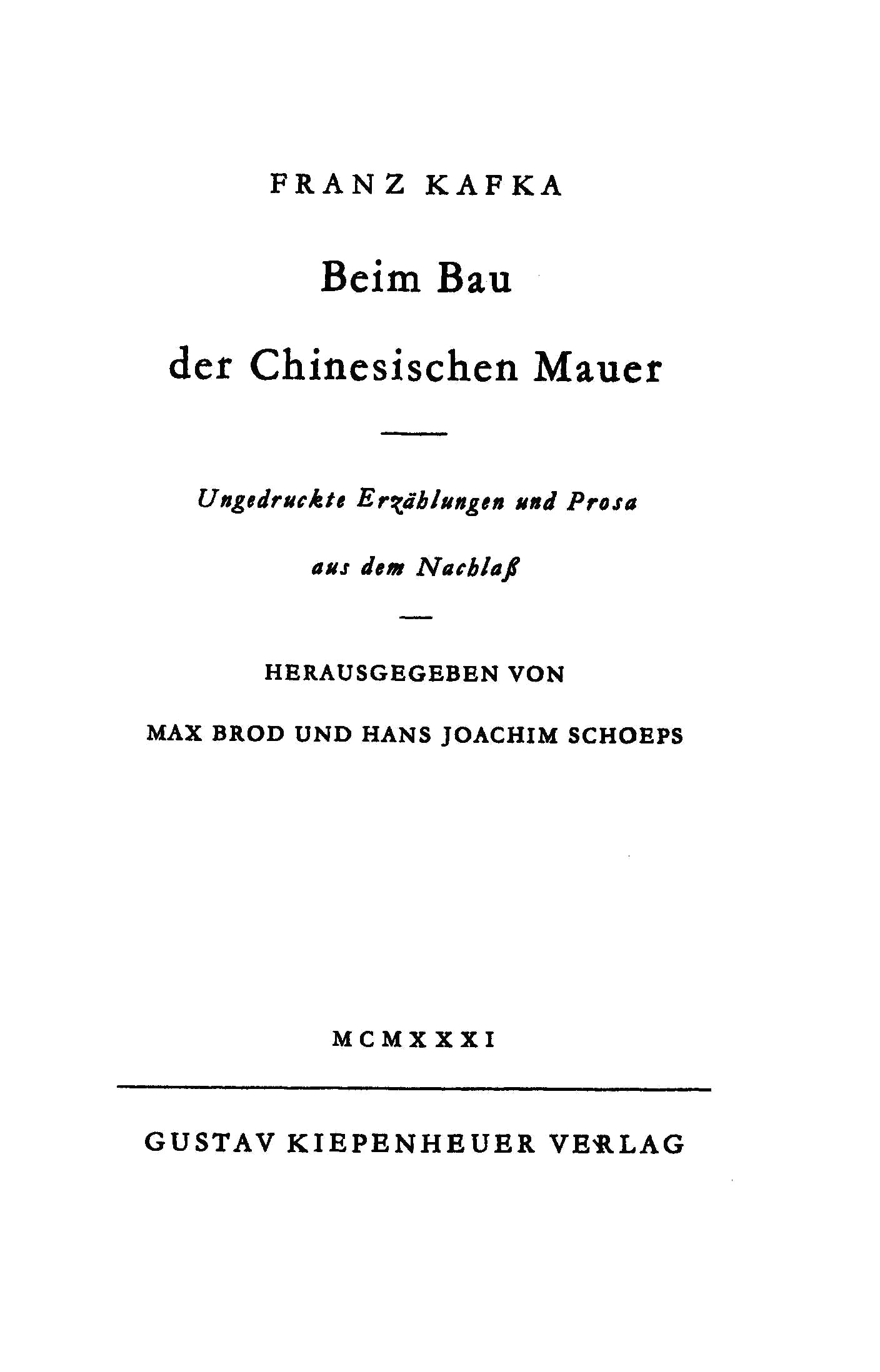
- Kafka Beim Bau der Chinesischen Mauer
- Original title: Beim Bau der Chinesischen Mauer
- Language: German
- Genre: Short story

Publication
- Published in: Der Morgen
- Media type: literary journal
- Publication date: 1930
- Published in English: 1933 London, Martin Secker; 1946 New York, Schocken Books

"The Great Wall of China" (German: Beim Bau der Chinesischen Mauer, lit. 'At the Construction of the Great Wall of China') is a short story by Franz Kafka. While written in 1917, it was not published until 1930, seven years after his death. Its first publication occurred in Der Morgen, a German literary magazine. A year later, Max Brod included it in Beim Bau der Chinesischen Mauer, the first posthumous collection of short stories by Franz Kafka.

Contained within the story is a parable that was separately published as "A Message from the Emperor" ("Eine kaiserliche Botschaft") in 1919 in the collection Ein Landarzt (A Country Doctor). Some sub-themes of the story include why the wall was built piecemeal (in small sections in many different places), the relationship of the Chinese with the past and the present and the emperor's imperceptible presence. The story is told in the first person by an older man from a southern province.

The first English translation, by Willa and Edwin Muir, was published by Martin Secker in London in 1933. It appeared in The Great Wall of China. Stories and Reflections (New York: Schocken Books, 1946).
