= Schocken Books =

Publisher specialising in Jewish literary works

- Parent company: Random House
- Founded: 1931
- Founder: Salman Schocken
- Country of origin: United States
- Headquarters location: New York City
- Distribution: Penguin Random House
- Publication types: Books
- Official website: knopfdoubleday.com/schocken-2/

Schocken Books is a book publishing imprint of Penguin Random House that specializes in Jewish literary works. Originally established in 1931 by Salman Schocken as Schocken Verlag in Berlin, the company later moved to Israel and then the United States, and was acquired by Random House in 1987.

== History ==
Schocken Books was founded in 1931 by Schocken Department Store owner Salman Schocken. Schocken has published the writings of Martin Buber, Franz Rosenzweig, Franz Kafka and S. Y. Agnon, among others.

After being shut down by the Germans in 1939, Schocken, who immigrated from Germany to Palestine in 1934, founded the Hebrew-language Schocken Publishing House in Mandatory Palestine. Schocken moved to the United States in 1940. In 1945 he founded the English-language Schocken Books in New York City. In 1987 it was bought up by Random House. Schocken Books continues to publish Jewish literary works.

== Selected English publications ==
=== Franz Kafka ===
- The Trial
- The Castle
- Amerika
- The Diaries 1910-1923
- Letters to Felice
- Letters to Ottla
- Letters to Milena
- Letters to Family, Friends, and Editors
- The Complete Stories
- The Sons
- The Penal Colony
- The Great Wall of China
- Dearest Father

Bilingual Editions

- The Metamorphosis
- Parables and Paradoxes
- Letter to His Father

=== Walter Benjamin ===
- Illuminations
- Reflections

=== Gershom Scholem ===
- Major Trends in Jewish Mysticism
- The Messianic Idea in Judaism
- On the Mystical Shape of the Godhead
- On the Kabbalah and its Symbolism
- Zohar: The Book of Splendor

=== Hannah Arendt ===
- The Promise of Politics
- The Jewish Writings
- Responsibility and Judgment
- Essays in Understanding, 1930-1954
- The Origins of Totalitarianism

=== Elie Wiesel ===
- The Time of the Uprooted
- Somewhere a Master
- Wise Men and Their Tales
- The Judges
- Legends of Our Time
- After the Darkness
- And the Sea Is Never Full
- The Testament
- The Fifth Son
- A Beggar in Jerusalem
- All Rivers Run to the Sea
- The Trial of God
- Twilight
- The Gates of the Forest
- The Town Beyond the Wall
- The Forgotten
- From the Kingdom of Memory
- The Oath
- Rashi

== See also ==
- Bücherei des Schocken Verlag
- Nahum Norbert Glatzer
- Haaretz
- Books in the United States
- Books in Germany
