= Pasley =

Pasley may refer to:

== People ==
- Charles Pasley (1780–1861), British soldier and military engineer who wrote the defining text on the role of the post-American revolution British Empire
- Charles Pasley (engineer) (1824–1890), son of the above, British military engineer responsible for many public works in Australia
- Kevin Pasley (born 1953), American professional baseball player whose career spanned 12 seasons
- Malcolm Pasley (1926–2004), British literary scholar best known for his dedication to and publication of the works of Franz Kafka
- Omar Pasley (born 1986), better known by his stage name OMI, Jamaican singer
- Pasley baronets, of Craig in the County of Dumfries, a title in the Baronetage of Great Britain
  - Sir Thomas Pasley, 1st Baronet (1734–1808), Royal Navy officer
  - Sir Thomas Sabine Pasley, 2nd Baronet (1804–1884), officer of the British Royal Navy during the nineteenth century

== Other uses ==
- Pasley, Missouri, unincorporated community in the United States
- HMS Pasley, the name of more than one British ship of the Royal Navy
- USS Pasley, the name of more than one United States Navy ship

== See also ==
- Paisley (disambiguation)
