= Scorpion-class ironclad =

British class of ironclad warships

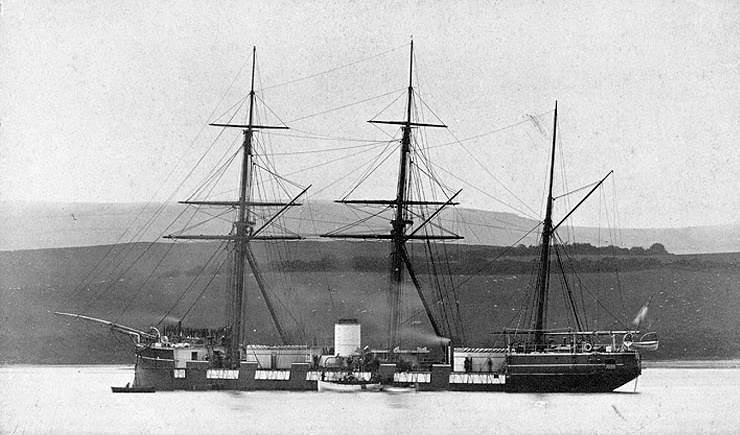
- HMS Wivern in 1865, note that the funnel is retracted

Class overview
- Name: Scorpion class
- Builders: Laird & Son Co., Birkenhead
- Operators: Royal Navy
- Built: 1862–1865
- In service: 1865–1922
- Planned: 2
- Completed: 2
- Scrapped: 2

General characteristics
- Type: Ironclad turret ship
- Displacement: 2,751 long tons (2,795 t)
- Length: 224 ft 6 in (68.4 m) (p/p)
- Beam: 42 ft 4 in (12.9 m)
- Draught: 17 ft (5.2 m) (deep load)
- Installed power: 4 boilers; 1,450 ihp (1,080 kW)
- Propulsion: 1 shaft, 1 steam engine
- Sail plan: Barque-rigged
- Speed: 10.5 knots (19.4 km/h; 12.1 mph)
- Range: 1,210 nmi (2,240 km; 1,390 mi) at 10 knots (19 km/h; 12 mph)
- Complement: 153
- Armament: 2 × twin 9 in (229 mm) muzzle-loading rifles
- Armour: Belt: 2–4.5 in (51–114 mm); Gun turrets: 5.5–10 in (140–254 mm)

The two Scorpion-class ironclads, HMS Scorpion and HMS Wivern, were ironclad warships ordered by the Confederate States Navy in 1862 and seized in 1863 by the British to prevent their delivery. This would have violated the Foreign Enlistment Act, which forbade British subjects to build or arm any ships for governments at war with governments friendly to Great Britain. The Scorpion class were masted turret ships, each with two gun turrets that were designed to mount a pair of heavy muzzle-loading guns. They were purchased for service in the Royal Navy in 1864 and served briefly with the Channel Fleet before they became guard ships at Bermuda and Hong Kong. Scorpion was sold in 1903 and sank under tow to be scrapped, while Wivern was sold for scrap in 1922.

== Design and description ==
In March 1862, a contract was placed with Laird & Son Co. by Captain James D. Bulloch, a naval agent for the Confederate States of America, for two double-turreted warships designed for ramming attacks at a cost of £93,750 each, exclusive of armament and ammunition. They were intended, together with other warships, to break the Federal blockade of Confederate coastal cities and to hold some Northern cities for ransom.

The ships had a length between perpendiculars of 224 feet 6 inches (68.4 m), a beam of 42 feet 4 inches (12.9 m), and a draught of 17 feet (5.2 m) at deep load. They displaced 2,751 long tons (2,795 t). The hull was divided by 12 watertight bulkheads and the ships had a double bottom beneath the engine and boiler rooms. Their crew consisted of 152 officers and men.

The gun turrets, designed by Captain Coles of the Royal Navy, sat on circular turntables that were built on an iron radial platform with arms that rested on beveled wheels 18 inches (457 mm) in diameter. Each turret required a crew of 18 men to rotate them via a system of rack and pinion gears; one minute was required for a full 360° rotation. They could be rotated from inside the turret as well from outside. In emergencies the turret could be turned by a block and tackle as well as use of handspikes. A leather flap extended around the bottom of the turret and over the gap between the turret and the deck to reduce any water leakage through the gap. Like most contemporary ironclads they were fitted with a forged iron ram.

The ships had 6 feet (1.8 m) of freeboard that could be increased by 5-foot (1.5 m) hinged bulwarks abreast the turrets. In service the ships proved to be buoyant and seaworthy although they rolled heavily which meant that their decks were often awash. Their flat bottom and small rudder, however, caused steering problems before the wind. Because of their seaworthiness and powerful guns they have been judged superior to any monitor built by the United States Navy.

=== Propulsion ===
The Scorpion-class ships had two horizontal direct acting steam engines, built by Lairds, driving a single three-bladed, 14-foot (4.3 m) propeller. Their engines were powered by four tubular boilers at a working pressure of 20 psi (138 kPa; 1 kgf/cm^{2}). The engines produced a total of 1,450 indicated horsepower (1,080 kW) which gave the ships a maximum speed of 10.5 knots (19.4 km/h; 12.1 mph). Wivern reached a maximum speed just over 11 knots (20 km/h; 13 mph) during her sea trials on 4 October 1865. The ships carried 336 long tons (341 t) of coal, enough to steam 1,210 nautical miles (2,240 km; 1,390 mi) at 10 knots (19 km/h; 12 mph). The ships were barque-rigged with three masts. Scorpion had conventional shrouds to anchor the masts in place, but Wivern was the first ship to have tripod masts to reduce interference with the firing arcs of the gun turrets. The funnel was made semi-retractable to reduce wind resistance while under sail.

=== Armament ===
No ordnance had been ordered by the Confederates before the ships were seized in 1863, but in British service they mounted a pair of 9-inch rifled muzzle-loading guns in each turret. The shell of the 9-inch (229 mm) gun weighed 254 pounds (115.2 kg) while the gun itself weighed 12 long tons (12 t). The gun fired its shell at a muzzle velocity of 1,420 ft/s (430 m/s) and was credited with the ability to penetrate a nominal 11.3 inches (290 mm) of wrought-iron armour at 100 yards (91 m). The guns could fire both solid shot and explosive shells. According to Parkes, going from full depression to full elevation supposedly took one hour in smooth water and with an even keel!

=== Armour ===
The Scorpion-class ships had a complete waterline belt of wrought iron that was 4.5 inches (114 mm) thick amidships and thinned to 3 inches (76 mm) at the bow and 2.5 inches (64 mm) at the stern. It completely covered the hull from the upper deck to 3 feet 3 inches (0.99 m) below the waterline. The armour protection of the polygonal turrets was quite elaborate. The inside of the turret was lined with .5 inches (12.7 mm) of iron boiler plate to which T-shaped beams were bolted. The space between the beams was filled with 10 inches (254 mm) of teak. This was covered by an iron lattice .75 inches (19.1 mm) thick that was covered in turn by 8 inches (203 mm) of teak. The 5.5-inch (140 mm) iron plates were bolted to the outside using bolts that ran through to the interior iron "skin". The area around the gun ports was reinforced by 4.5-inch plates to give a total thickness of 10 inches. The turret roof consisted of T-shaped beams covered by 1-inch (25 mm) iron plates. Holes in the roof were provided for ventilation and for the gun captain to use to aim the turret.

== Construction ==
In his letter of 29 October 1862, Confederate Navy Secretary Stephen Mallory named yard number 294 as North Carolina and number 295 as Mississippi. In January 1863 the Foreign Secretary, Lord Russell, notified Bulloch, who had purchased the ships in his own name, that the ships would be prevented from sailing if they were doing so to form part of the fleet of a nation currently at war. Bulloch therefore transferred ownership to some French bankers in June 1863, nominally on behalf of the Egyptian government, with the intention of transferring them to the Confederate flag once they were at sea. The Khedive was attempting to acquire warships, so this was superficially plausible. North Carolina, later HMS Scorpion, was given the cover name of El Toussan, and Mississippi, later HMS Wivern, received the name of El Monnassir. Lord Russel, prompted by the protests of the U.S. Ambassador, Charles F. Adams queried the Egyptian government directly and confirmed that this was merely a subterfuge to disguise the true ownership of the vessels. The Admiralty was prompted to send a guard ship, HMS Majestic, to watch over the newly launched El Toussan after Lairds had made a request to begin sea trials in September. The Liverpool Collector of Customs was instructed not to let the ship leave her graving dock under any circumstances and the Surveyor of Customs finally seized the ships on 9 October.

The legality of this seizure was seriously disputed, but the British government had already been somewhat embarrassed by the activities of Alabama, a ship also built by Laird Son & Co and operated as a commerce raider by the Confederate Navy. In order to overshadow discussions as to the legality of their action, the British government purchased the ships on 8 August 1864 for £25,000 in excess of the contract price.

Ship	Builder	Laid down	Launched	Commissioned	Fate	Cost
HMS Scorpion	Laird & Son Co., Birkenhead	April 1862	4 July 1863	July 1865	Sold February 1903, sank under tow	£111,614
HMS Wivern	Laird & Son Co., Birkenhead	April 1862	29 August 1863	28 September 1865	Sold June 1922	£118,769

== Service ==
Both ships were assigned to the Channel Fleet upon commissioning in 1865. Scorpion was refitted in 1867 with a flying bridge that connected the forecastle to the poop, above the tops of the turrets, and her sailing rig was reduced to a fore-and-aft rig. The ship recommissioned in 1868 for another tour with the Channel Fleet. She arrived in Bermuda in November 1869 where she became the local guard ship. In 1873 a proposal was made to remove her poop and forecastle, masts and deck fitting to convert her to a harbour defence monitor with all-around fire, but this was deemed too expensive and the project was abandoned in 1878. At some point during her service in Bermuda her rigging was removed and she was reduced to simple pole masts. The ship was fitted with searchlights and quick-firing guns in 1890. Scorpion was sunk as a target in 1901; she was raised in 1902 and sold in February 1903 for £736. She sank while under tow to Boston, Massachusetts.

Wivern burst one of her 9-inch guns in 1867, but none of the 13 people in the turret was injured. She was given the same sort of refit as her sister ship in Devonport beginning in August 1868. The ship became the guard ship at Hull from January through October 1870 and was then placed in reserve from 1870 until 1880. That year she was sent to Hong Kong where she became the harbour defence ship. Wivern became a distilling ship in 1898 and was sold in May 1922 for scrap.
