= Paisley =

Paisley may refer to:

- Paisley (design), an ornamental Persian pattern or motif commonly identified with the town of Paisley, Renfrewshire, in west Scotland

== People ==
- Paisley (name), including a list of people with the name
- Lord Paisley, in the peerage of Scotland

== Places ==
- Paisley, Renfrewshire, Scotland, where the Paisley pattern was popularized
- Paisley, Florida, United States
- Paisley, Oregon, United States
- Paisley, Pennsylvania, United States
- Paisley, Ontario, Canada
- Paisley, Edmonton, Alberta, Canada
- Paisley, South Australia
- Diocese of Paisley, an ecclesiastical territory of the Roman Catholic Church in Scotland
- Paisley Caves, Oregon, United States
- Paisley Islet, an islet off Kangaroo Island, South Australia

== Other ==
- Paisley (Scottish Parliament constituency)
- Paisley (UK Parliament constituency) (1832–1983), corresponding to the Scottish town
- Paisley Grammar School, in Paisley, Renfrewshire
- Paisley Park, a record label owned by the musician Prince; also the name of his estate
- Paisley Terrier, a breed of dog, ancestor of the Yorkshire Terrier
- Paisley Underground, a style of 1960s influenced music, usually associated with the 1980s Los Angeles music scene

== See also ==
- Paisley by-election (disambiguation)
- Paisley North (disambiguation)
- Paisley South (disambiguation)
- Paisley railway station (disambiguation)
- Pasley (disambiguation)
