= History of foreign policy and national defense in the Republican Party =

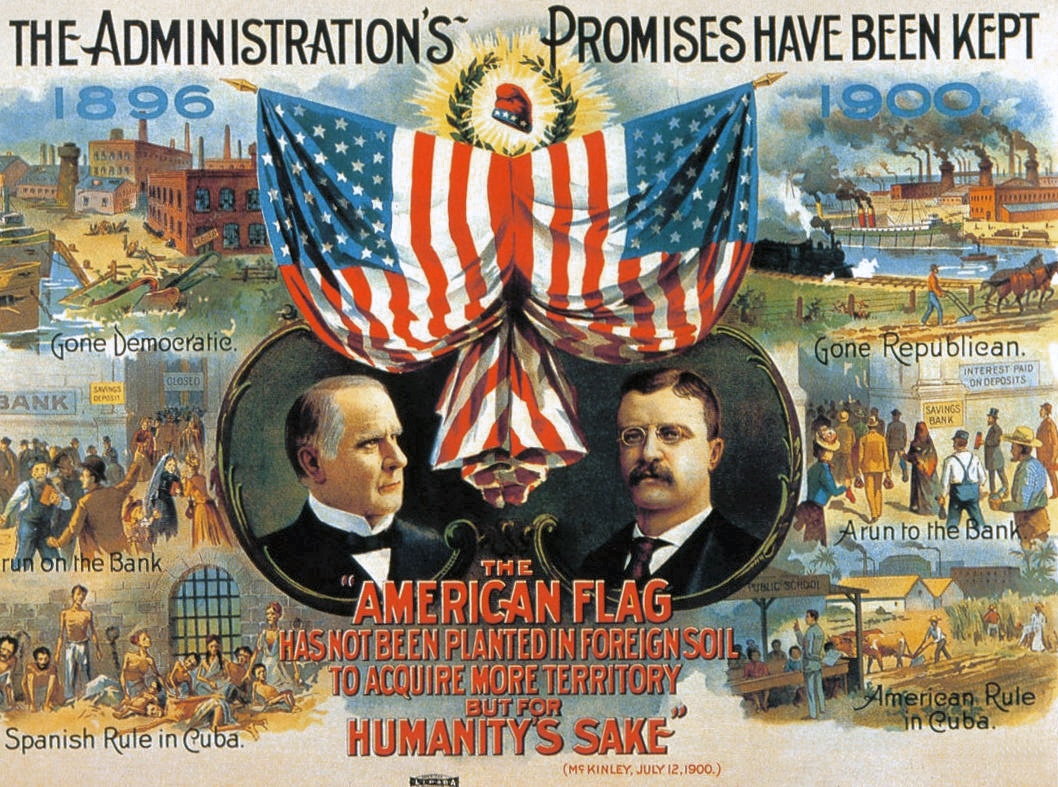
McKinley won reelection in 1900 by stressing his foreign policy and economic successes.

The Republican Party of the United States has held a variety of views on foreign policy and national defense over the course of its existence. Generally speaking, it has advocated for a more militaristic foreign policy (with the exception of isolationist and libertarian elements). Republican presidents have joined or started a number of wars over the course of American history, with mixed results.

Republicans supported Woodrow Wilson's call for American entry into World War I in 1917, complaining only that he was too slow to go to war. Republicans in 1919 opposed his call for entry into the League of Nations. A majority supported the League with reservations; a minority opposed membership on any terms. Republicans sponsored world disarmament in the 1920s, and isolationism in the 1930s. Most Republicans staunchly opposed intervention in World War II until the Japanese attack on Pearl Harbor in 1941. By 1945, however, internationalists became dominant in the party which supported the Cold War policies such as the Truman Doctrine, the Marshall Plan, and NATO.

== History ==
=== Lincoln and Seward in the Civil War ===
When Abraham Lincoln became president in 1861, he appointed his as Secretary of State Senator William H. Seward, a leader of the Republicans in New York state. They worked closely together on all diplomatic matters, and the administration appointed Republicans for the first time to diplomatic positions. Charles Francis Adams, Congressman from Massachusetts, became minister to the Court of St. James (that is, Great Britain), and worked with great success to keep that power neutral. When the war started, Seward turned his attention to making sure that foreign powers did not interfere in the conflict. When the Confederacy announced in April 1861 that it would authorize privateers, Seward sent word to the American representatives abroad that the U.S. would become party to the Paris Declaration Respecting Maritime Law of 1856. This would outlaw such vessels, but Britain required that, if the U.S. were to become a party, the ratification would not require action to be taken against Confederate vessels.

The Palmerston government considered recognizing the Confederacy as an independent nation. Seward was willing to wage war against Britain if it did and drafted a strong letter for Adams, to read to the Foreign Secretary, Lord Russell. Seward submitted it to Lincoln, who, realizing that the Union was in no position to battle both the South and Britain, toned it down considerably, and made it merely a memorandum for Adams's guidance.

In May 1861, Britain and France declared the South to be belligerents by international law, and their ships were entitled to the same rights as U.S.-flagged vessels, including the right to remain 24 hours in neutral ports. Nevertheless, Seward was pleased that both nations would not meet with Confederate commissioners or recognize the South as a nation. Britain did not challenge the Union blockade of Confederate ports, and Seward wrote that if Britain continued to avoid interfering in the war, he would not be overly sensitive to what wording they used to describe their policies.

In November 1861, a Navy warship under Captain Charles Wilkes, intercepted the British mail ship RMS Trent and removed two Confederate diplomats, James Mason and John Slidell. They were held in Boston amid jubilation in the North and outrage in Britain. The British minister in Washington, Lord Lyons, demanded their release, as the U.S. had no right to stop a British-flagged ship traveling between neutral ports. The British drew up war plans to attack New York and sent reinforcements to Canada. Seward worked to defuse the situation. He persuaded Lyons to postpone delivering an ultimatum and told Lincoln that the prisoners would have to be released. Lincoln did let them go, reluctantly, on technical grounds Relations between the U.S. and Britain soon improved; in April 1862, Seward and Lyons signed a treaty they had negotiated allowing each nation to inspect the other's ships for contraband slaves. In November 1862, with America's image in Britain improved by the issuance of the preliminary Emancipation Proclamation, the British cabinet finally decided against recognition of the Confederacy as a nation.

Despite Britain's neutrality, Confederate agents in Britain had arranged for the purchases of arms to be delivered to Confederate ports through blockade runners, which were fast small freighters built in Britain and owned and operated by British. Furthermore the Confederates funded the construction of warships, most notably the CSS Alabama, which sank many Union merchant ships after her construction in 1862. With two more such vessels under construction the following year, supposedly for French interests, Seward pressed Palmerston not to allow the warships to leave port, and, nearly complete, they were seized by British officials in October 1863. After the war Washington demanded compensation for the damages in the Alabama Claims. London agreed to arbitration and paid $15.5 million in 1872. The result was a reconciliation and good relations between the two nations, known as the Great Rapprochement.

=== James G. Blaine in 1880s and 1890s ===
James G. Blaine served as Secretary of State in 1881 and 189-1892 under Republican presidents James G. Garfield, Chester Arthur and Benjamin Harrison. Although his foreign policy experience was minimal, Blaine quickly threw himself into his new duties and quickly had a major impact on shaping foreign policy. By 1881, Blaine had completely abandoned his old protectionist high tariff leanings and now used his position as Secretary of State to promote freer trade, especially within the western hemisphere. His reasons were twofold: firstly, Blaine's old fear of British interference in the Americas was undiminished, and he saw increased trade with Latin America as the best way to keep Britain from dominating the region. Secondly, he believed that by encouraging exports, he could increase American prosperity, and by doing so position the Republican party as the author of that prosperity, ensuring continued electoral success. Garfield agreed with his Secretary of State's vision and Blaine called for a Pan-American conference in 1882 to mediate disputes among the Latin American nations and to serve as a forum for talks on increasing trade. At the same time, Blaine hoped to negotiate a peace in the War of the Pacific then being fought by Bolivia, Chile, and Peru. Blaine favored a resolution that would not result in Peru yielding any territory, but Chile, which had by 1881 occupied the Peruvian capital, rejected any negotiations that would gain them nothing. Blaine sought to expand American influence in other areas, calling for renegotiation of the Clayton–Bulwer Treaty to allow the United States to construct a canal through Panama without British involvement, as well as attempting to reduce British involvement in the strategically located Kingdom of Hawaii. His plans for the United States' involvement in the world stretched even beyond the Western Hemisphere, as he sought commercial treaties with Korea and Madagascar.

In 1889 newly elected President Harrison had developed his foreign policy based largely on Blaine's ideas, and they largely agreed. Unrelated personality conflicts caused tensions but they continued to agree on foreign policy. Blaine and Harrison wished to see American power and trade expanded across the Pacific and were especially interested in securing rights to use harbors in Pearl Harbor, Hawaii, and Pago Pago, Samoa. When Blaine entered office, the United States, Great Britain, and the German Empire were disputing their respective rights in Samoa. Blaine appointed American representatives to a three-party conference in Berlin aimed at resolving the dispute. It produced a treaty that created a condominium among the three powers, allowing all of them access to the harbor. Regarding Latin America, Blaine promoted the First International Conference of American States, which met in Washington in 1890. They were frustrated in not making much progress on their overly ambitious goals for a customs union, a pan-American railroad line, and an arbitration process to resolve disputes .

In Hawaii, Blaine worked to bind the independent kingdom more closely to the United States and to avoid its coming under British control. When the McKinley Tariff of 1890 eliminated the import tax on sugar, Hawaiian sugar-growers looked for a way to retain their once-exclusive access to the American market. The Hawaiian to the United States, Henry A. P. Carter, tried to arrange for Hawaii to have complete trade reciprocity with the United States, but Blaine proposed instead that Hawaii become an American protectorate; Carter favored the idea, but the Hawaiian king, Kalākaua, rejected the infringement on his sovereignty. Blaine next procured the appointment of his former newspaper colleague John L. Stevens as minister to Hawaii. Stevens had long believed that the United States should annex Hawaii, and as minister he co-operated with Americans living in Hawaii in their efforts to bring about annexation. Their efforts ultimately culminated in a coup d'état against Kalākaua's successor, Liliuokalani, in 1893. Blaine's precise involvement is unclear. The new government of Hawaii petitioned the United States for annexation, but by that time Harrison and Blaine were no longer in office and the new president Grover Cleveland sytrongly opposed annexation.

== McKinley, Roosevelt and Taft, 1897-1913 ==
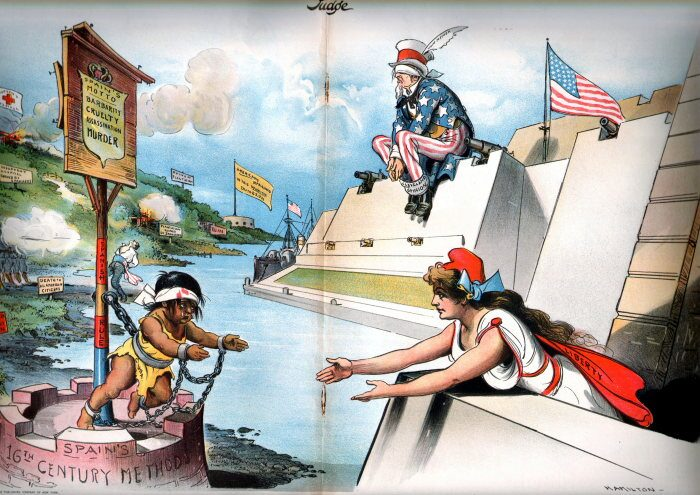
Editorial cartoon calling for humanitarian intervention in Cuba. Columbia (the American people) reaches out to help oppressed Cuba in 1897 while Uncle Sam (the U.S. government) is blind to the crisis and will not use its powerful guns to help. Judge magazine, February 6, 1897.

The McKinley administration brought foreign affairs to the top of the agenda for the first time since the 1840s. Most Republicans supported an expansionist foreign policy, building the American presence in the world that suited its increasing economic dominance. Opposition came from an anti-imperialist element, that include some old time Republicans, as well as most Democrats. However, in 1898 the Democrats took the lead in demanding Spain stop oppressing the independent-minded people of Cuba, while McKinley tried to stop the rush to war.

=== Roosevelt administration, 1901–1909 ===
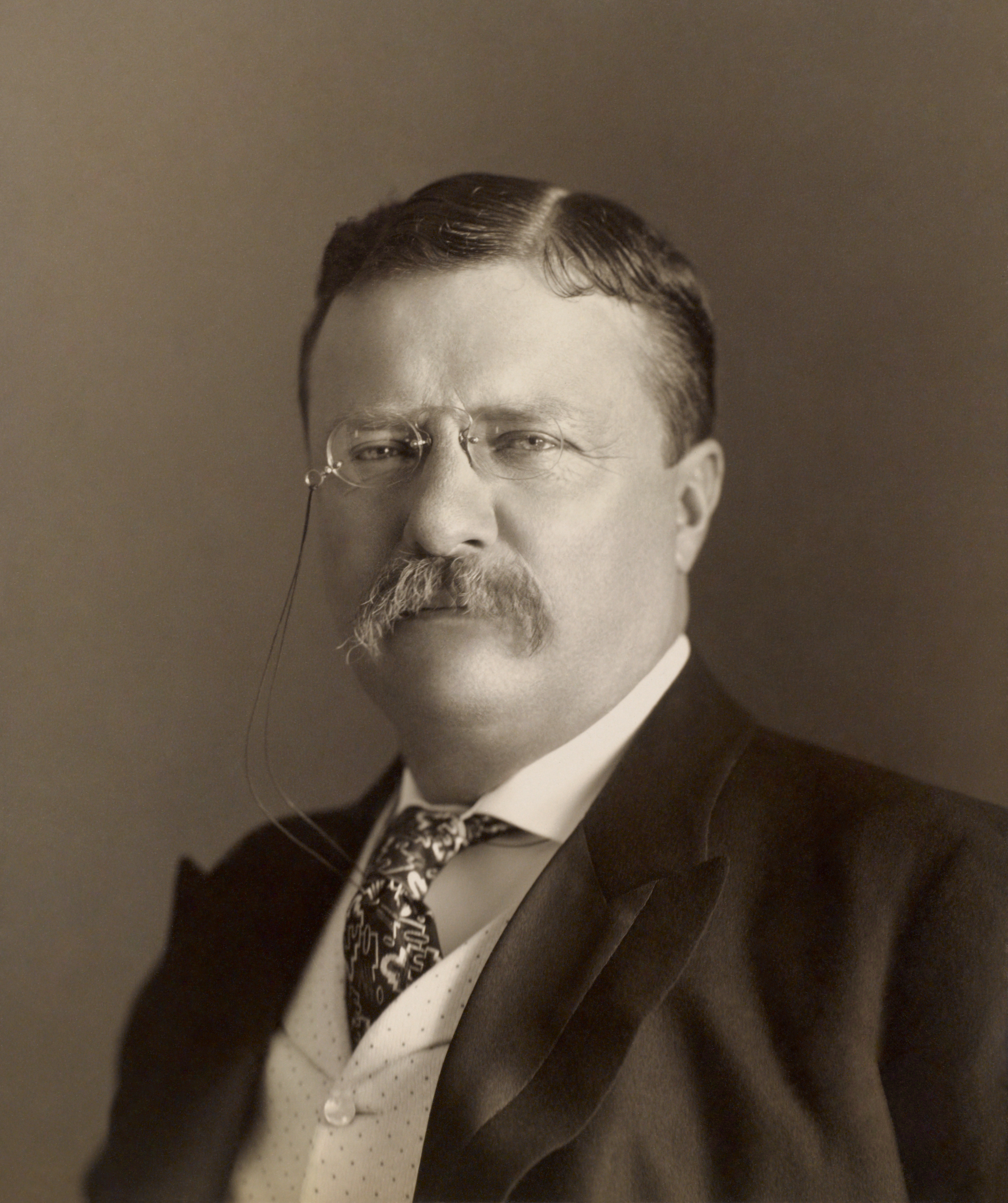
President Theodore Roosevelt personally directed U.S. foreign policy from 1901 to 1909.

McKinley was assassinated in September 1901 and was succeeded by Vice President Theodore Roosevelt. Roosevelt came into office without any particular domestic policy goals, broadly adhering to most Republican positions on economic issues. He had strong views on foreign policy, as he wanted the United States to assert itself as a great power in international relations. Anxious to ensure a smooth transition, Roosevelt convinced the members of McKinley's cabinet, most notably Secretary of State John Hay and Secretary of the Treasury Lyman J. Gage, to remain in office. Another holdover from McKinley's cabinet, Secretary of War Elihu Root, had been a Roosevelt confidante for years, and he continued to serve as President Roosevelt's close ally. Root returned to the private sector in 1904 and was replaced by William Howard Taft, who had previously served as the governor-general of the Philippines. The president confided in Taft and took his advice on many foreign policy issues. After Hay's death in 1905, Roosevelt convinced Root to return to the Cabinet as secretary of state, and Root remained in office until the final days of Roosevelt's tenure.

== Hoover Administration 1929-1933 ==
In the midst of a worldwide depression, Hoover and Secretary of State Henry Stimson became more closely involved in world affairs than Hoover's Republican predecessors had been. According to William Leuchtenburg, Hoover was "the last American president to take office with no conspicuous need to pay attention to the rest of the world." But during Hoover's term, the world order established with the 1919 Treaty of Versailles began to crumble.

== 1930s and 1940s ==
The party's chief spokesman on foreign policy in the 1930s and 1940s was Arthur Vandenberg, Senator from Michigan 1928 to 1951. In the 1930s he was an isolationist. During World War II he became an internationalist, bringing along most of the party leaders except followers of Ohio Senator Robert A. Taft.

== 1950s: Dwight Eisenhower ==
In the 1952 presidential election General Dwight D. Eisenhower, the NATO supreme commander, was drafted by the Republican Party to counter the candidacy of non-interventionist Senator Robert A. Taft. Eisenhower's campaign was a crusade against the Truman administration's policies regarding "Korea, Communism, and Corruption".

== 1970s: Nixon and Ford ==
Most Republicans supported Nixon-Ford-Kissinger policy of Vietnamization (letting South Vietnam do the fighting in the Vietnam War with American arms) and their policy of détente with the Soviet Union and China. The conservative wing, led by Reagan, denounced détente with the USSR but was defeated by Ford in the 1976 presidential primaries. When Ford lost his reelection bid to Jimmy Carter in the subsequent election, Reagan's approach dominated the party.

== 1981–1989: Ronald Reagan ==
=== Cold War ===
President Reagan reignited the Cold War. Détente was rejected in 1979 by President Jimmy Carter in the face of the Soviet invasion of Afghanistan. Reagan then ordered a massive buildup of the United States Armed Forces, especially the SDI project to undermine the Soviet nuclear threat by shooting down its missiles.

=== Grenada ===
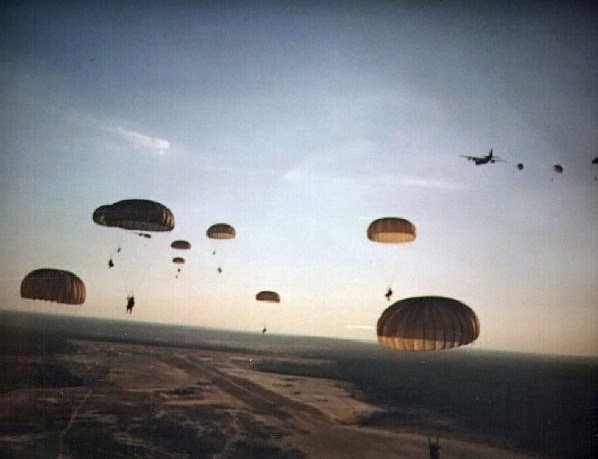
U.S. Army Rangers conduct an airborne assault in Saint George Parish, Grenada during the hostilities.

On October 25, 1983, at the request of the regional governments, Reagan ordered Operation Urgent Fury, a military invasion of the small Caribbean island of Grenada, where over a thousand American students and their families were in residence. A Marxist coup d'état had overthrown the established government and shot its leader Maurice Bishop. This was the first actual rollback that destroyed a Communist regime and marked the continued escalation of tensions with the Soviet Union known as the Second Cold War. Democrats had been highly critical of Reagan's anti-Communism in Latin America, but this time Reagan had strong support from the voters and leading Democrats said the invasion was justified. It built the President's image of decisive strong action a year before the 1984 election, when Mondale said he too would have ordered the invasion. Indeed, Mondale attacked Senator Gary Hart, his chief opponent for the Democratic nomination, as isolationist and weak on fighting dictatorships.

=== Covert operations ===
Under a policy that came to be known as the Reagan Doctrine, Reagan and his administration also provided overt and covert aid to anti-communist resistance movements in an effort to "roll back" Soviet-backed communist governments in the Third World. The policy was politically controversial, with liberal Democrats especially angry with Reagan's operations in Latin America. Covert operations elsewhere, especially covert aid to the mujahideen in the Soviet-Afghan War, however, usually won bipartisan support.

== 1989–1993: George H. W. Bush ==
=== 1990–91: Gulf War ===
On August 1, 1990, Ba'athist Iraq, led by Saddam Hussein, invaded Kuwait. President Bush formed an international coalition and secured UN approval to expel Iraq. On January 12, 1991, Congress voted approval for a military attack, Operation Desert Storm, by a narrow margin, with Republicans in favor and Democrats opposed. The vote in the House was 250–183, and in the Senate 52–47. In the Senate 42 Republicans and 10 Democrats voted yes to war, while 45 Democrats and two Republicans voted no. In the House 164 Republicans and 86 Democrats voted yes, and 179 Democrats, three Republicans and one Independent voted no. The war was short and successful, but Hussein was allowed to remain in power. Arab countries repaid all the American military costs.

== 1993–2001: Opposition politics ==
In the 1990s, Republicans in Congress split over the NATO military intervention in the Yugoslav Wars under Democratic President Bill Clinton. Examples of interventionist-minded Republicans are then Senate Majority Leader Bob Dole and Senator John McCain and examples of opposing figures are later Senate Majority Leader Trent Lott and House Majority Leader Dick Armey, the latter of which who called deployment in the Kosovo War "poorly considered and unlikely to achieve our desired ends". In 2000, successful Republican Presidential candidate George W. Bush ran on a platform that generally opposed U.S. involvement in foreign conflicts, saying that the U.S. didn't have the responsibly of "nation building". As such, he advocated U.S. military withdrawal from the Balkan NATO peacekeeping mission.

== 2001–2009: George W. Bush ==
=== Invasion of Afghanistan ===
After the September 11 attacks in 2001 in New York, Bush launched the war on terrorism, in which the United States led an international coalition invaded Afghanistan, the base of terrorist Osama bin Laden. This invasion led to the toppling of the Taliban regime. After a surprise raid on bin Laden's compound on May 2, 2011, ordered by Barack Obama, bin Laden was killed and his body disposed of in the sea. There was bipartisan support for this action, with notable Republican and Democratic figures speaking out in support of the raid.

=== Invasion of Iraq ===
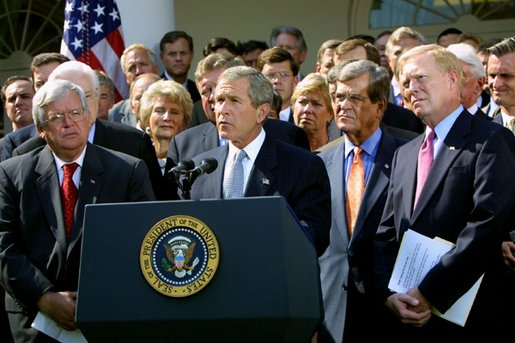
President George W. Bush, surrounded by leaders of the House and Senate, announces the Iraq war resolution on October 2, 2002.

In 2003, following the bipartisan Iraq war resolution and the perceived issues regarding UN weapons inspectors, President Bush launched the invasion of Iraq, in conjunction with coalition partners, most notably, the United Kingdom. The invasion was described by Bush as being part of the general "war on terrorism". Iraqi dictator Saddam Hussein was captured and executed, but his supporters and other opposing forces staged an insurgency that dragged on for years. It was a major election issue in 2004 (when Bush was reelected) and in 2006 and 2008 (when President Obama was first elected to the Presidency, and Democrats increased their numbers in both Houses of Congress).

Significant public support for the war effort existed in the early days among both parties and others, but opinions changed course soon with about half of Americans surveyed in November 2003 judging the end result as not worth it. The lack of expected stockpiles of weapons of mass destruction and the failures of the military occupation of Iraq altered voters' views. Polling done by CBS News on the ten-year anniversary of the U.S. invasion found that Republicans, by a margin of 61%, believed that the military action was the right thing to do, with majorities of Democrats and independents disagreeing. However, that same poll found that Republicans were divided on 46% to 45% lines on the question of if U.S. forces succeeded in their overall objectives. By January 2014, 52% of Republicans were supportive of military action in Iraq, with 38% saying the war had succeeded, showing that support for the war among Republicans has declined over time.

== 2009–2017: Policy changes ==
President Barack Obama, inaugurated in January 2009 and later reelected to a second term, continued the previous policy of keeping large-scale intervention in the War in Afghanistan, with a plan of removing combat troops while Afghan forces trained to replace them until late 2014. An October 2012 Pew Research Center poll found Republicans evenly divided at 48% over the choices of keeping American military forces in Afghanistan "until the situation has stabilized" analogous to Obama's policies versus making them leave "as soon as possible". An article in the news-magazine Foreign Policy stated that this represented a move from a previous "hawkish" stance by Republicans.

=== The Arab Spring ===
The Republican Party has been largely split on the attitude the United States should take in response to the events of the Arab Spring. Republican leadership in the House and Senate supported the 2011 military intervention in Libya, though many conservative congressional Republicans, such as Michele Bachmann, voted in opposition to the intervention. Similarly, many senior Republicans, including presidential candidates John McCain, Mitt Romney and Marco Rubio supported arming the Syrian rebels, while conservative Republicans in Congress proclaimed their opposition to this. Congressional Republicans, including Senate Minority Leader Mitch McConnell, were overwhelmingly opposed to the proposed US military intervention in Syria. In both Libya and Syria, Republicans opposed to intervention have cited Islamist influence within the rebel groups and a lack of U.S. national security interest as the reason for their opposition. During the 2016 presidential election cycle, many prominent Republicans, including John Kasich, Ted Cruz, Donald Trump and even figures typically associated with the interventionist wing of the party, such as Tom Cotton and Rudy Giuliani, have criticized the Democratic presidential nominee Hillary Clinton for her decision to support the intervention in Libya as Secretary of State.

=== Ukraine ===
Leading Republicans in Congress all supported sanctions against Russia in response to the 2014 Russian military intervention in Ukraine. No major politician of either party opposed the first rounds of American and EU sanctions in April 2014. A minority of Republicans, such as Congressman Dana Rohrabacher and Donald Trump, have been critical of U.S. support for the Ukrainian government, urging closer ties with Russia.

=== Iran ===
Both Republicans and Democrats in Congress have generally favored sanctions against Iran for its nuclear program. Congressional Republicans and 2016 Republican presidential candidates universally opposed approval of the Obama administration's Iran deal, which would lift sanctions in exchange for increased inspections of Iran's nuclear facilities.

== 2017–2021: Donald Trump ==
=== Russia ===
Under the leadership of President Donald Trump, the new Republican administration has shifted to a much less hawkish stance on the Russian Federation, with Republican leaders considering lifting sanctions on Russia and Trump nominating a Secretary of State, Rex Tillerson, who has strong ties to Russia.

There has also been a marked change in the attitudes of Republican voters towards Russian President Vladimir Putin. In July 2014, 66% of Republicans viewed Putin unfavorably, but as of December 2016, only 10% do so. Also in 2019 Morning Consult poll also found that Republicans and Republican-leaning independents where 21% more likely than Democrats and democratic-leaning independents to express confidence in Putin, though only 31% of Republicans stated they had confidence in Putin.

=== China ===
The Trump administration has demonstrated a more hostile stance towards the People's Republic of China, with Trump breaking U.S. diplomatic convention since the Shanghai Communiqué by taking a call from the President of Taiwan (a.k.a. Republic of China) Tsai Ing-wen, leading to a rebuke by the PRC government. There has been some speculation that the rapprochement with Russia is intended to isolate the PRC, which has shared strong relations with Russia over the past two decades after the dissolution of the Soviet Union and the 1989 Tiananmen Square protests and massacre. As relations between the two countries deteriorate, the previous US-China strategic engagement has been abandoned. Beyond this, exactly what "strategic competition" signified to the Trump administration was never fully specified. In contrast to the Bush era, however, Trump’s administration largely followed through with its foreign policy of embarking on a "whole-of-government approach" against China, whereby all executive departments were encouraged to be tough on the PRC.

=== Syria ===
The Trump administration has taken a different stance from the previous Obama administration on the Syrian Civil War, with UN Ambassador Nikki Haley and Secretary of State Rex Tillerson both stating in March 2017 that the United States would no longer prioritize the removal of Syrian President Bashar al-Assad from office, in line with Trump's stance during his campaign.
