= John Malcolm =

Madras Army officer, diplomat and historian

Major-General Sir John Malcolm GCB KLS
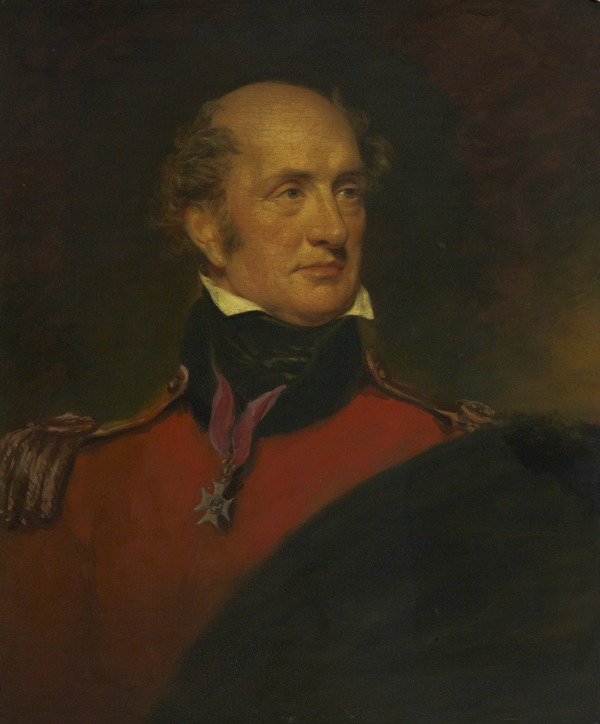
- Portrait by Samuel Lane, c. 1826

Governor of Bombay
- In office 1 November 1827 – 1 December 1830
- Monarchs: George IV; William IV
- Governors-General: The Earl Amherst; Lord William Bentinck
- Preceded by: Mountstuart Elphinstone
- Succeeded by: The Earl of Clare

Personal details
- Born: 2 May 1769 Burnfoot, Dumfriesshire, Scotland
- Died: 30 May 1833 (aged 64) London, England
- Occupation: Soldier, Statesman, Historian

Military service
- Allegiance: United Kingdom
- Branch: Madras Army, East India Company
- Service years: 1782–1833
- Rank: Major-General
- Battles/wars: Third Anglo-Mysore War; Fourth Anglo-Mysore War; Battle of Mahidpur

Major-General Sir John Malcolm GCB KLS (2 May 1769 – 30 May 1833) was a Madras Army officer, diplomat, colonial administrator, politician and historian.

== Early life ==
Sir John Malcolm was born in 1769, one of seventeen children of George Malcolm, an impoverished tenant farmer in Eskdale in the Scottish Border country, and his wife Margaret ('Bonnie Peggy'), née Pasley, the sister of Admiral Sir Thomas Pasley. His brothers included Sir James Malcolm, Admiral Sir Pulteney Malcolm and Sir Charles Malcolm. He left school, family and country at the age of thirteen, and achieved distinction in the East India Company, where he was nicknamed 'Boy Malcolm'.

== Career ==
Arriving at Madras in 1783 as an ensign in the East India Company's Madras Army, he served as a regimental soldier for eleven years, before spending a year in Britain to restore his health. He returned to India in 1795 as Military Secretary to General Sir Alured Clarke, participating en route in Clarke's capture of the Cape of Good Hope. In the Anglo-Mysore wars of 1799 he served with the Hyderabad contingent, and later as joint secretary of the Peace Commission setting up the new government of Mysore. Later that year he was selected by the Governor-General (Lord Mornington, later Marquess Wellesley) to lead a diplomatic mission to Iran. Following his return in 1801 he became Wellesley's private secretary, based in Calcutta (Kolkata).

In the Anglo-Maratha war of 1803–05, he accompanied Sir Arthur Wellesley (later Duke of Wellington) as the Governor-General's representative and diplomatic agent; the two men forming a lifelong friendship. In 1804, he was appointed British Resident at Mysore, but in 1805-6 saw further service in north India with General Lake.

In early 1808, the Governor-General, Lord Minto, sent him on a second mission to Iran, but at this time French influence was dominant in Tehran, and he was rebuffed. Later that year a separate mission from London under Sir Harford Jones arrived in Iran and achieved success, the Iran government having by then become disenchanted with the French. Malcolm was again sent to Iran in 1810, but by that time the British government had decided to conduct diplomatic relations with Iran directly from London, and appointed Sir Gore Ouseley as ambassador.

In 1812, Malcolm returned to Britain for five years' furlough, and spent much of his time as a writer, completing his History of Iran (the first in English derived directly from Iran sources) in 1815. For this he received an honorary DCL from the University of Oxford. Returning to India in 1817, he acted as the Governor-General's agent in negotiations leading up to the third (and last) Anglo-Maratha war. He also acted as a general, leading Company troops to victory against Maharajah Malhar Rao Holkar II at the decisive Battle of Mahidpur (Mehidpoor) on 21 December 1817. In January 1818, Malcolm was placed by the Marquess of Hastings in the military and political charge of Central India (roughly, today's Madhya Pradesh); during the four years he filled that station, his attention was directed to the object of collecting materials for the illustration of its past and present condition. The report hereof he sent to Calcutta, where it was printed by order of Government. Disappointed to being superseded for the governorship of Bombay and Madras by his juniors, Malcolm left for Britain in 1822, where he lived with his family as a country gentleman, completing two more books.

In 1827 he was appointed Governor of Bombay. His governorship was generally successful, despite controversy over an unfortunate quarrel with the judges of the Bombay Supreme Court, who sought to extend their jurisdiction beyond Bombay to the Deccan hinterland, newly acquired by the company from the Maratha Peshwa of Poona. In seeking to end both sati (the self-immolation of widows on their husband's funeral pyres) and female infanticide by moral persuasion, Malcolm visited Gujarat in February 1830 and met Sahajanand Swami, the founder of the Swaminarayan sect of Hinduism, who was advocating similar reforms. He has ever since been remembered in Swaminarayan literature. Together with his predecessor, Mountstuart Elphinstone, he was a pioneer in the promotion of Indian education and the training of Indians for the higher ranks of government. He also served as president of the Literary Society of Bombay

In 1831 Malcolm finally returned to Britain, and immediately became a Member of Parliament for the rotten borough of Launceston, supporting his friend the Duke of Wellington in opposition to the Reform Bill. He bought Warfield Hall in Berkshire from the Parry family and busied himself renovating it. His last public act was a speech in April 1833 to the Proprietors (shareholders) of the East India Company, persuading them to accept the Government's terms for renewal of its Charter. Immediately afterwards he suffered a stroke and died on 30 May 1833. He was buried in St James's Church, Piccadilly.

There is a marble statue of Malcolm, by Francis Chantrey, in the north transept of Westminster Abbey. There is also a statue of him in the town hall at Bombay and a 100-foot-high obelisk celebrating his achievements on Whita Hill, above Langholm in Scotland.

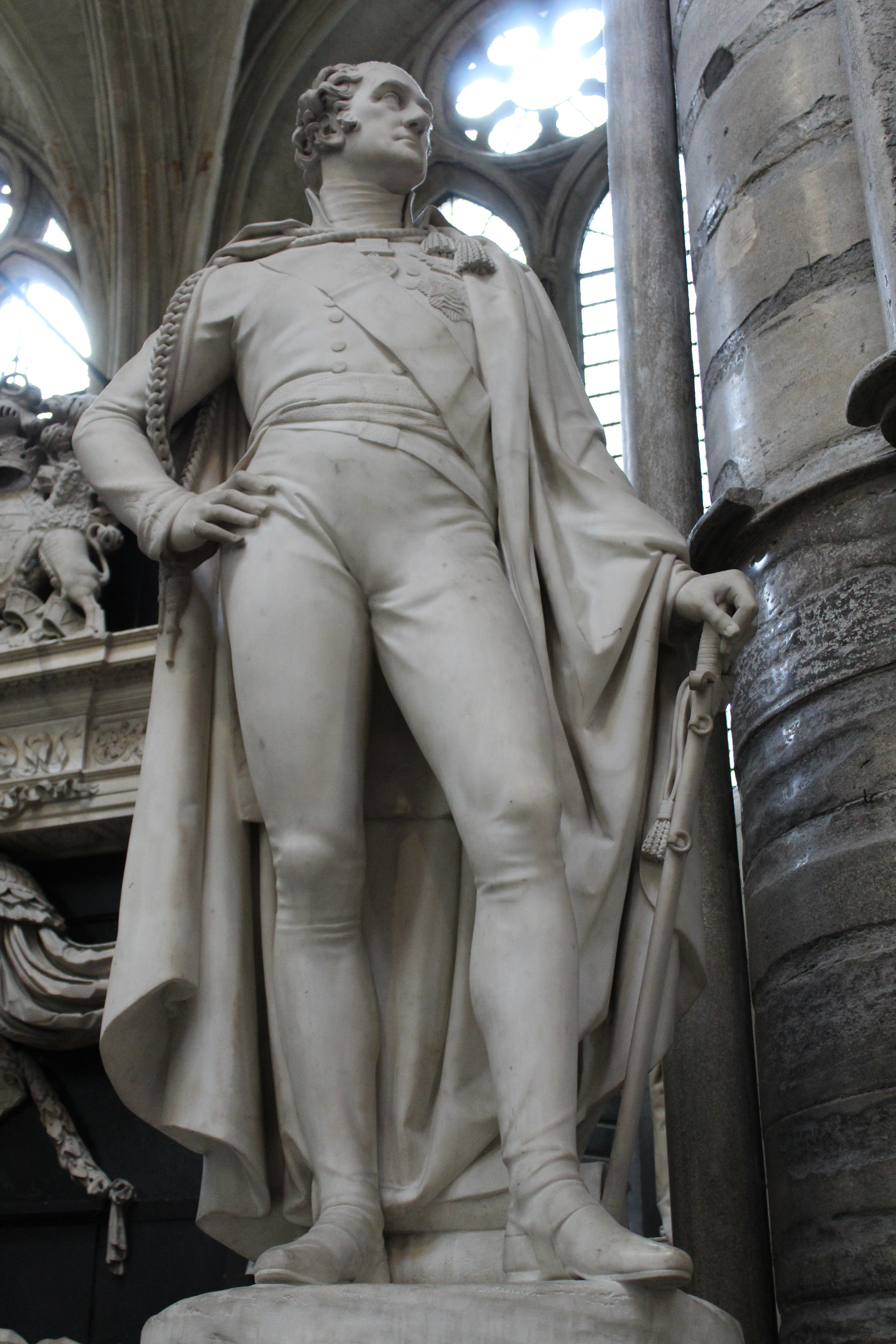
Statue of Malcolm in Westminster Abbey

== Family ==
In 1807 he married (in Mysore) Isabella Charlotte, the second daughter of General Sir Alexander Campbell. She bore five children, including George Alexander Malcolm.

== Legacy ==
Together with his contemporaries Mountstuart Elphinstone and Sir Thomas Munro, Malcolm was an architect of three early principles of British rule, whose wisdom "was too soon forgotten and remembered too late". Four main themes can be identified. Firstly, India was to be ruled for the benefit of the company – but also of Indians, i.e. no British settlers. Secondly, indirect rule was to be preferred, leaving existing Indian rulers in place wherever possible, with minimal disturbance of traditional methods of governance, religion and social structure. Thirdly, Malcolm helped to develop the role of the District Officer, a small group of powerful administrators with minimal overt force to support them. Fourthly, Malcolm promoted a 'forward' foreign policy; meaning diplomatic engagement with neighbouring states such as Iran, Afghanistan and Central Asia.

He was a mentor and inspiration to several celebrated Anglo-Indian statesmen – among them Henry Pottinger, Charles Metcalfe, Alexander Burnes and Henry Rawlinson

== Literary works ==
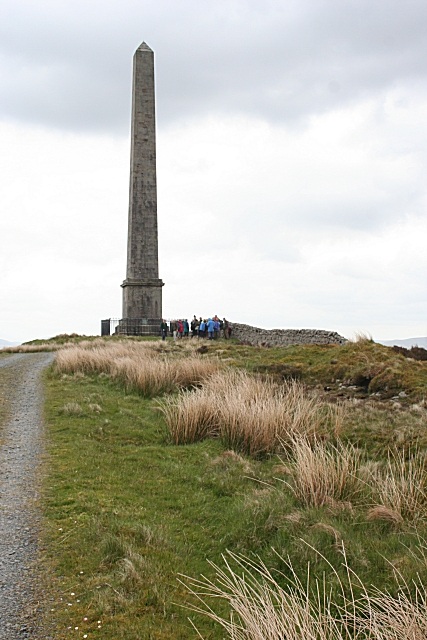
Malcolm Monument

Malcolm wrote nine books, plus a volume of poetry, as follows:

- Sketch of the Sikhs (1812)
- Sketch of the Political History of India (1811)
- Disturbances in the Madras Army in 1809 (1812)
- The History of Persia (1815)
- A Memoir of Central India (1823)
- The Political History of India (1826)
- Sketches of Persia (1827) – this book is not written by Malcolm, but by one of his companions in his mission to Iran; the writer remains anonymous and has introduced himself as the traveller; he has referred to Malcolm in his text as ilch, which is a Persian word meaning envoy of a foreign country
- The Government of India (1833)
- The Life of Robert, Lord Clive (1836; posthumous)

Parliament of the United Kingdom
Preceded by Sir James Gordon; James Brogden	Member of Parliament for Launceston; 1831–1832; With: James Brogden	Succeeded by Sir Henry Hardinge
Government offices
Preceded by The Honourable Mountstuart Elphinstone	Governor of Bombay; 1827–1830	Succeeded by Sir Thomas Sidney Beckwith
