= Western Kangaroo Island Marine Park (state waters) =

Marine park in Australia

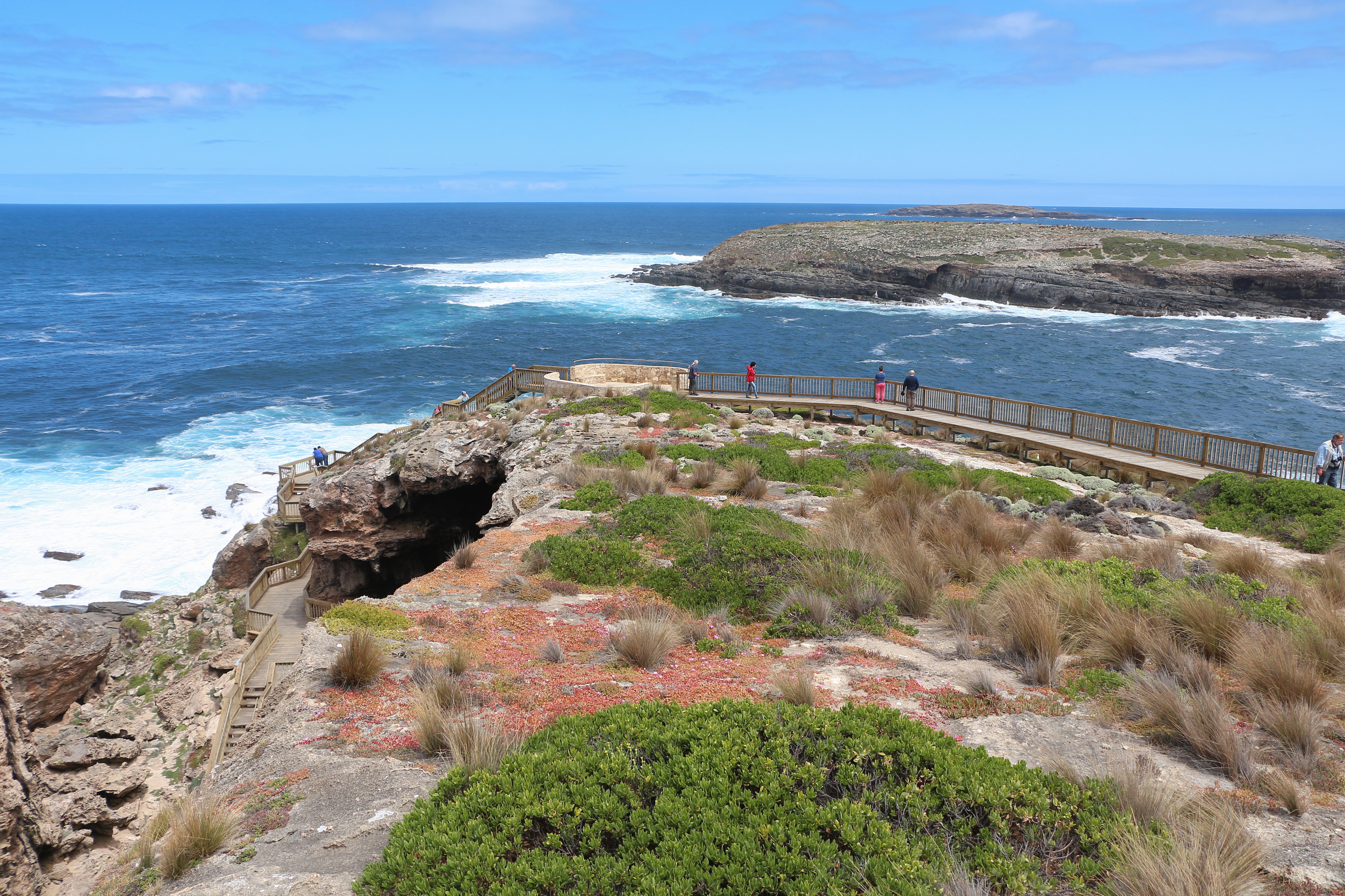
- View from Cape du Couedic of the Casuarina Islets where a Restricted Access Zone is in force.

- Location within South Australia
- Location: South Australia
- Nearest city: Kingscote
- Coordinates: 35°57′16″S 136°33′10″E
- Area: 1,020 km^{2} (390 sq mi)
- Established: 29 January 2009
- Governing body: Department for Environment and Water
- Website: Official website

Western Kangaroo Island Marine Park is a marine protected area in the Australian state of South Australia located in the state’s coastal waters adjoining both the west coast of Kangaroo Island and Lipson Reef, an islet located to the south of Kangaroo Island.

The marine park was established on 29 January 2009 under the Marine Parks Act 2007.

The marine park consists of two areas of water. The first is the portion of coastal waters adjoining the coastline to the western end of Kangaroo Island extending from the middle of Sanderson Bay on the south coast to Cape Forbin on the north coast. The seaward boundary is the limit of coastal waters which moves away from within 3 nautical miles (5.6 km; 3.5 mi) of the island in a northern-westerly direction towards the Eyre Peninsula while the northern boundary is a line with an east-west alignment and located about 4 kilometres (2.5 mi) north of Cape Forbin. The second is the coastal waters within 3 nautical miles (5.6 km; 3.5 mi) of Lipson Reef which is located about 16 kilometres (9.9 mi) south-east of Cape du Couedic.

The marine park is divided into zones to manage the marine environment to ensure varying degrees of “protection for habitats and biodiversity” and varying levels of “ecologically sustainable development and use” as follows:

1. Three “restricted access zones” cover the full extent of Paisley Islet and Casuarina Islets, and the intertidal zone on the coastline adjoining the geological feature known as Remarkable Rocks.
2. Three “sanctuary zones” consists of waters between Cape Borda in the west and Cape Forbin in the east off the north coast of the island, the north-western corner of the marine park and the waters off the south coast of the island between Cape du Couedic in the west and Remarkable Rocks in the east.
3. Two “habitat protection zones” occupy the remainder of the marine park where “activities and uses that do not harm habitats or the functioning of ecosystems” are only permitted.

The marine park is adjoined at the limits of coastal waters to the south-west by the Western Kangaroo Island Marine Park which is a marine protected area managed by the Australian government.

As of 2016, the marine park has been classified under the IUCN system of protected area categories with the “restricted access zones” being Category Ia, the “sanctuary zones” being IUCN Category II and the “habitat protection zones” being IUCN Category IV.
