= Western Kangaroo Island Marine Park =

Marine protected area south-west of Kangaroo Island in Australia

- Interactive map of Western Kangaroo Island Marine Park
- Location: Australia
- Nearest city: Kingscote, South Australia
- Coordinates: 35°45′52.56″S 136°17′3.84″E
- Area: 2,335.31 km^{2} (901.67 sq mi)
- Established: 8 December 2012
- Governing body: Director of National Parks
- Website: Official website

Western Kangaroo Island Marine Park (formerly Western Kangaroo Island Commonwealth Marine Reserve) is a marine protected area located south of South Australia in waters within the Australian Exclusive economic zone to the south-west of Kangaroo Island and ranging in depth from 15 metres (49 feet) to 165 metres (541 feet).

It was gazetted in November 2012. It was renamed on 11 October 2017.

It is part of a group of Australian marine parks managed by the Department of the Environment and Energy known as the South-west Marine Parks Network. It adjoins the Western Kangaroo Island Marine Park managed by the Government of South Australia which it both bounds on its north-west side and fully encloses the portion of the state marine park surrounding Lipson Reef near its eastern extent.

The marine park includes ecosystems representative of the bioregion known as the "Spencer Gulf Shelf Province", two "key ecological features" consisting of firstly of a feature known as the "Kangaroo Island Pool" and the associated "Eyre Peninsula upwelling" both notable for their "high productivity, breeding and feeding aggregations" and secondly of a feature described as "ancient coastline" within a depth range of 90–120 metres (300–390 ft) and as being of "high productivity", a calving area for southern right whale and feeding areas for the Australian sea lion, blue whale, Caspian tern, great white shark, short-tailed shearwater and sperm whale.

The marine park consists of two zones - a marine national park zone (IUCN Category II) with an area of 120 square kilometres (46 square miles) and a special purpose zone (IUCN Category VI) with an area of 2,215 square kilometres (855 square miles).

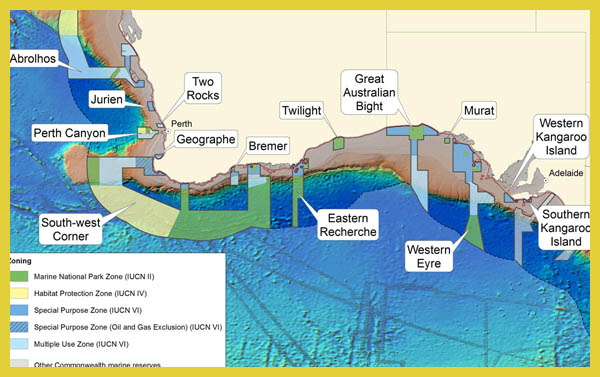
The South-west Marine Parks Network, including the Western Kangaroo Island Marine Park

== See also ==
- Protected areas managed by the Australian government
