= William Robert Mends =

Royal Navy Admiral (1812-1897)

Admiral Sir William Robert Mends GCB
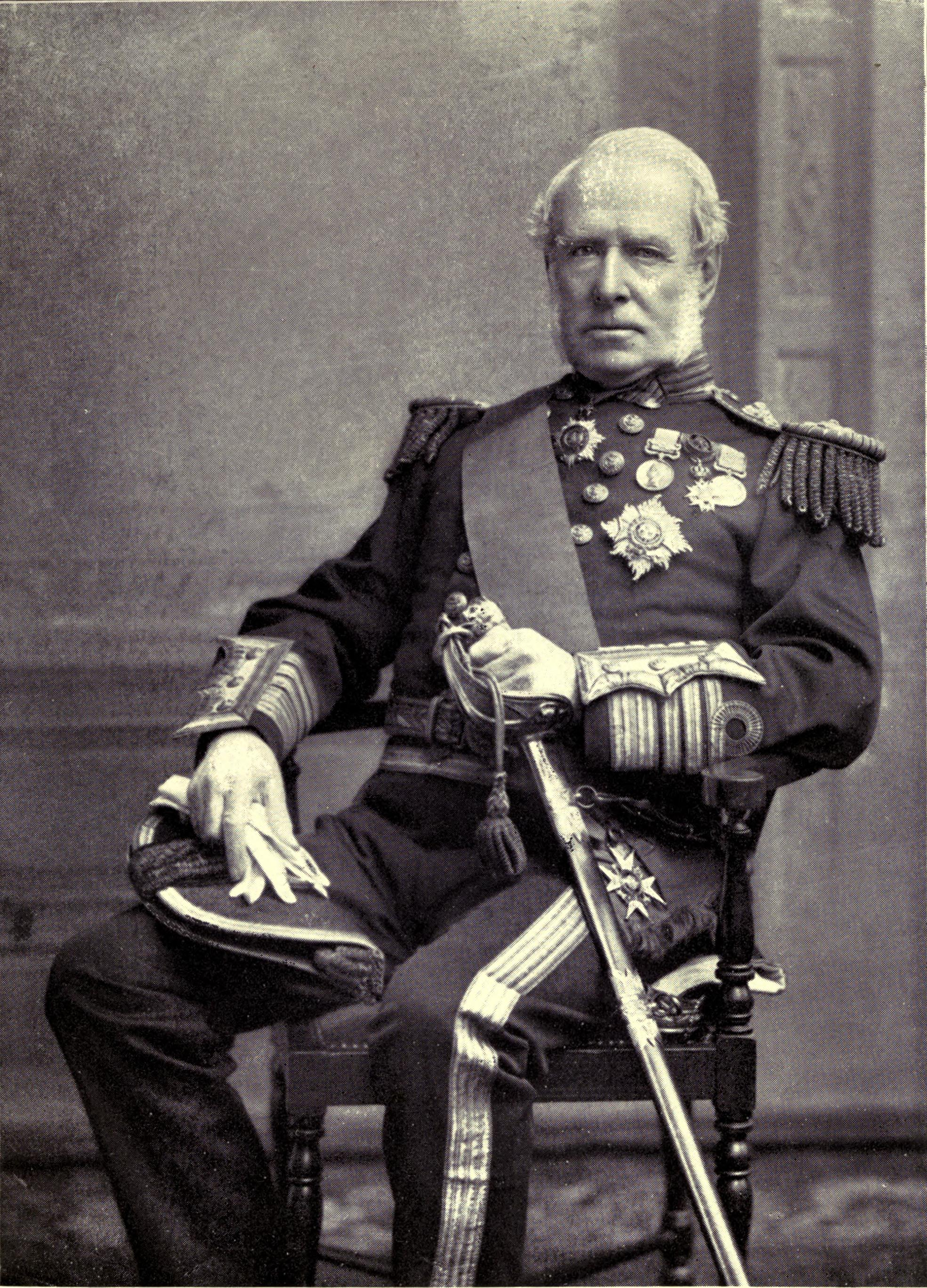
- Born: 27 February 1812; Plymouth, Devon, England
- Died: 26 June 1897 (aged 85); Alverstoke, Hampshire, England
- Spouse: Melita Stilon (m. 1839)
- Father: Admiral William Bowen Mends
- Military career
- Allegiance: United Kingdom
- Branch: Royal Navy
- Service years: 1825 – 1879
- Rank: Admiral
- Units: HMS Vernon; HMS Caledonia; HMS Rodney; HMS Ganges; HMS Fox; HMS Vengeance
- Commands: HMS Ceylon; HMS Benbow; HMS Vanguard; HMS Agamemnon; HMS Arethusa; HMS Royal Albert; HMS Hastings; HMS Majestic
- Conflicts: Crimean War
- Awards: Commander of the Order of the Bath (5 July 1855); Knight Commander of the Order of the Bath (20 May 1871); Knight Grand Cross of the Order of the Bath (24 November 1882)

Sir William Robert Mends, GCB (27 February 1812 – 26 June 1897), was a British admiral of the Royal Navy, eldest son of Admiral William Bowen Mends and nephew of Captain Robert Mends.

William Mends was born at Plymouth into a naval family. He married Melita, third daughter of Dr Joseph Stilon M.D. R.N. on 6 January 1839. The doctor was born Giueseppe Maria Joseph Stilon, a native of Calabria and a Royal Naval surgeon in Malta.

== Naval career ==
He entered the Royal Naval College on 7 May 1825. On 11 August 1835 he became a lieutenant and from 30 December served on-board HMS Vernon in the Mediterranean (commanded by Edward Russell). He moved to HMS Caledonia, the flagship of Josias Rowley and commanded by John M'Kerlie on 29 November 1836. From 13 January 1837 he served as lieutenant in HMS Rodney commanded by Hyde Parker, still in the Mediterranean. Mends moved to take command of HMS Ceylon, a receiving ship based at Malta on 28 July 1838. Mends was posted to HMS Benbow, then HMS Ganges as flag lieutenant to Sir John Louis, Admiral-Superintendent at Malta.

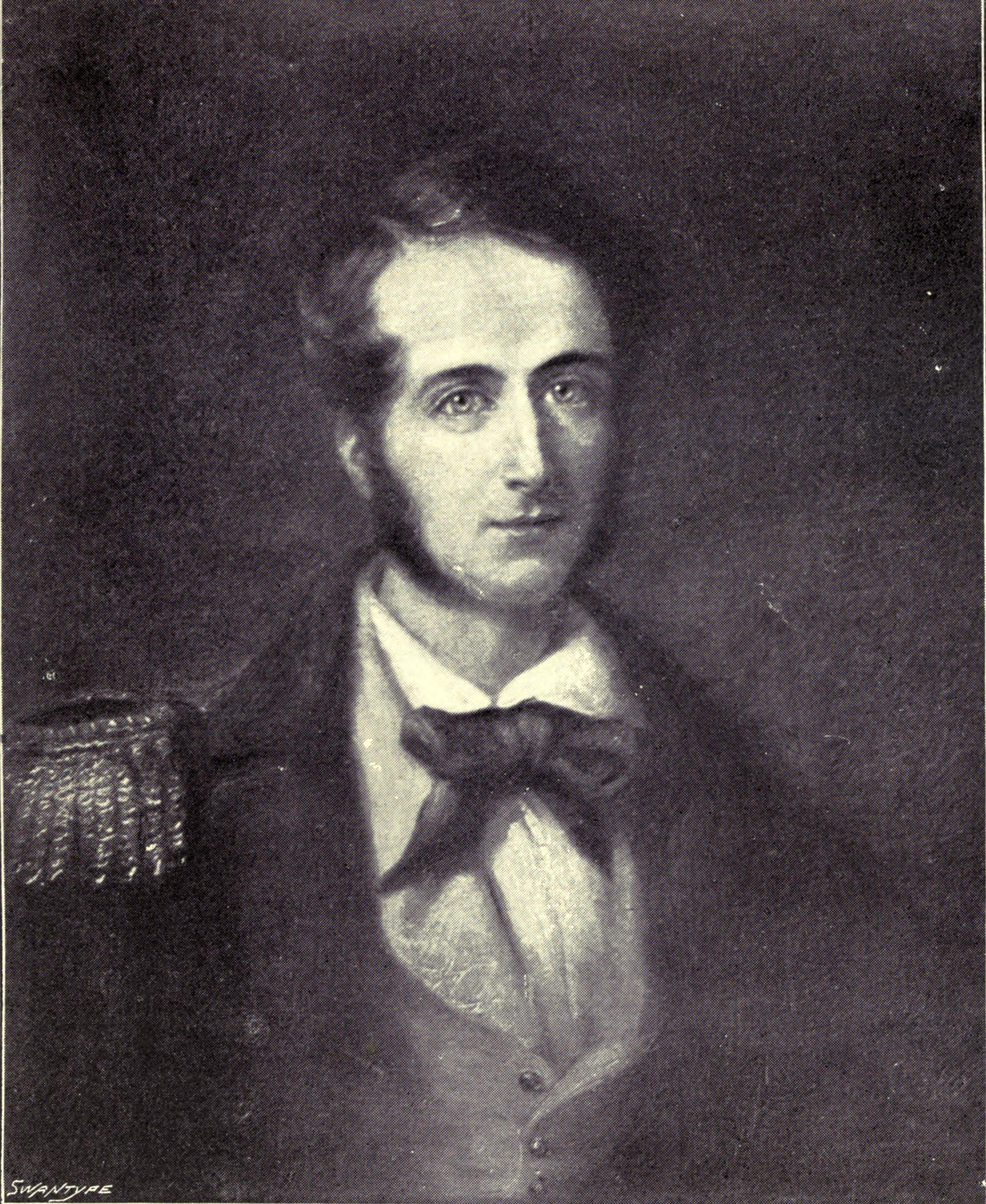
Lieutenant Mends, 1842

From 3 November 1843 to 1846 he served as lieutenant in HMS Fox commanded by Commodore Sir Henry Martin Blackwood stationed off Ireland and then the East Indies.

On 8 November 1846 he was promoted to commander, serving in HMS Vanguard from 1 January 1848 to March 1849 once more in the Mediterranean, under Captain George Frederick Rich, and then from 11 July 1850 on HMS Vengeance commanded by Henry Martin Blackwood at Portsmouth.

Mends was promoted to captain on 10 December 1852. He served from 22 October 1853 to 1 January 1854 as captain of HMS Agamemnon, flagship to Rear-Admiral Edmund Lyons of the Mediterranean fleet, during the Crimean War. From January 1854 he was captain of HMS Arethusa serving in the Black Sea. Between 14 February 1855 and April 1857 he was captain of HMS Royal Albert, flagship to Edmund Lyons in the Black Sea and then the Mediterranean. From 3 April 1857 to 1 February 1860 he was captain of HMS Hastings on Coast Guard service. He moved to take command of HMS Majestic on 1 February 1860 when she replaced Hastings on coast guard service and was then appointed deputy controller general of the coast-guard in 1861. He spent May 1862 to February 1883 as Director of Transport at the Admiralty.

Mends retired at the rank of rear-admiral on 1 January 1869, was promoted to vice-admiral on 1 January 1874 and then a full admiral on 15 June 1879.
