= Paisley North =

Paisley North may refer to:

- Paisley North (UK Parliament constituency)
- Paisley North (Scottish Parliament constituency)

== See also ==
- Paisley (disambiguation)
