= HMS Royal Albert =

Ship of the line of the Royal Navy

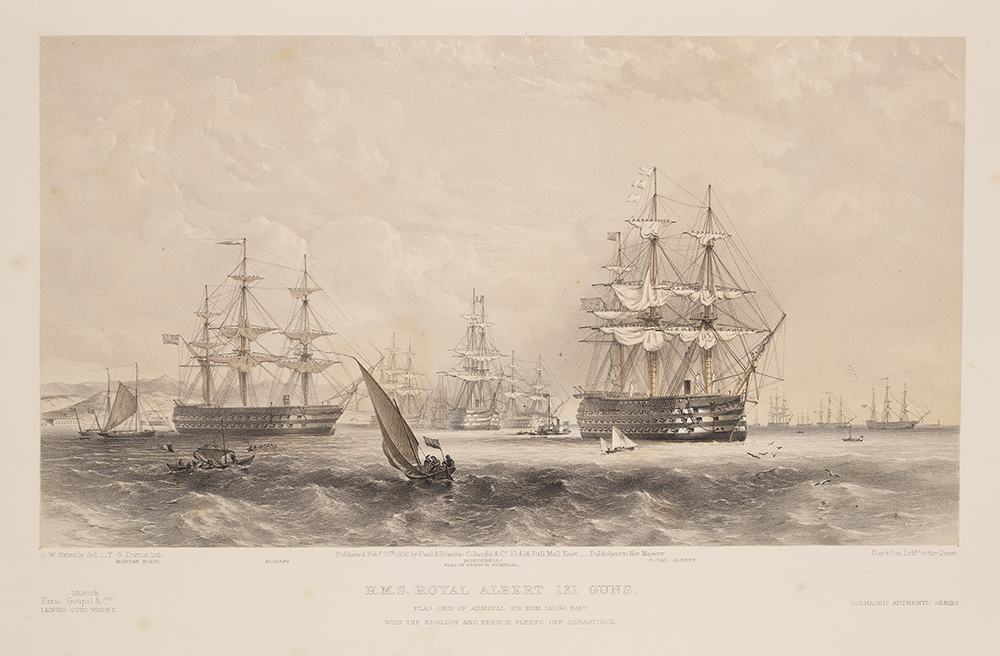
- HMS Royal Albert (right), 131 Guns, 1856, Lithograph T.G.Dutton, after Oswald Walters Brierly

History

United Kingdom
- Name: Royal Albert
- Namesake: Prince Albert
- Ordered: As sailing ship: 26 March 1842; As screw propelled: 31 January 1852
- Builder: Woolwich Dockyard
- Laid down: August 1844
- Launched: 13 May 1854
- Completed: 19 November 1854
- Commissioned: 19 June 1854
- Decommissioned: 25 January 1861
- Fate: Sold for scrap, September 1884

General characteristics (as a steamship)
- Displacement: 5,517 long tons (5,606 t)
- Tons burthen: 3,726 26/94 (bm)
- Length: 232 ft 9 in (70.9 m) (o/a)
- Beam: 61 ft (18.6 m)
- Draught: 27 ft 2 in (8.3 m)
- Depth of hold: 24 ft 2 in (7.4 m)
- Installed power: Boilers; 1,801 ihp (1,343 kW)
- Propulsion: 1 screw; trunk steam engine
- Sail plan: Full-rigged ship
- Speed: 10 knots (19 km/h; 12 mph)
- Complement: 1,050
- Armament: 121 muzzle-loading, smoothbore guns; Lower gun deck: 32 × 8 in (203 mm) shell guns; Middle gun deck: 32 × 32-pdrs; Upper gun deck: 32 × 32-pdrs; Forecastle/Quarterdeck: 24 × 32-pdrs + 1 × 68-pdr gun

HMS Royal Albert was a three-deck, 121-gun, first-rate ship of the line, built for the Royal Navy (RN) during the 1850s, the only ship of her class. She had originally been designed as a sailing ship, but was converted to screw propulsion while still under construction. Completed in 1854, the ship served in the Black Sea during the Crimean War of 1854–1856 against the Russian Empire and participated in the Battle of Kinburn the following year. Royal Albert served as the flagship of the Mediterranean Fleet during the war and later the Channel Squadron. The ship was paid off in 1861 as some of the timbers used in her conversion to screw propulsion had rotted. Despite this, she was not sold for scrap until 1884.

== Background and description ==
Royal Albert was designed by Oliver Lang, master shipwright of Woolwich Dockyard, as an enlarged version of HMS Trafalgar, the last ship built of the broadened Caledonia class that had been designed by Sir Robert Seppings, the previous Surveyor of the Navy. She was "the largest sailing battleship ever designed for the RN and the only sailing first rate after 1830 that was not to the Queen design." The Board of Admiralty chose Lang over the current Surveyor of the Navy, William Symonds, because of serious disagreements over his ship designs which were radically different to previous practice. Where Lang's design represented a development of established hull forms, Symonds favoured exceptionally broad, sharply V-shaped hulls intended to provide greater stability and carry a larger spread of sail, thereby improving sailing performance. Party factionalism also played a significant role as the First Lord of the Admiralty, Earl Haddington, and the First Naval Lord, Admiral George Cockburn, were both Tories with Symonds a Whig.

The ship was intended to measure 220 feet (67.1 m) at the gun deck and 177 feet 2 inches (54.0 m) at the keel. She would have had a beam of 60 feet (18.3 m), a depth of hold of 25 feet (7.6 m) and had a tonnage of 3,393 70/94 tons burthen. Her crew would have numbered 1,000 officers and ratings. The ship had the usual three-masted full-ship rig. Royal Albert was intended to be armed with 120 muzzle-loading, smoothbore guns that consisted of twenty-eight 32-pounder (56 cwt) guns (Note: "Cwt" is the abbreviation for hundredweight, 56 cwt refers to a gun weighing 2,845 kg (6,272 lb).) and four 8 in (203 mm) (65 cwt), 68-pounder shell guns on her lower gun deck, thirty-two 32-pounder guns and two 8-inch shell guns on her middle gun deck and thirty-four 32-pounders (49 cwt) on her upper gun deck. Her forecastle and quarterdeck would have carried a total of six 32-pounders (42 cwt) and fourteen short 32-pounder (25 cwt) guns between them.

Royal Albert was ordered on 26 March 1842 and laid down at Woolwich Dockyard in August 1844. Her design was enlarged to 3,463 tons burthen on 24 March 1851 by lengthening her aft by 12 feet 9 inches (3.9 m); however, some of the internal capacity was now occupied by the boilers, coal bunkers, engine and associated steam machinery. The ship was reordered as a screw-propelled ship on 31 January 1852 using the 620-nominal horsepower (nhp) engine that had been ordered for the cancelled frigate Euphrates. This was part of the response to the revolutionary French 90-gun, screw-powered ship of the line, Napoléon, by the new Surveyor of the Navy, Baldwin Wake Walker, that included the hasty conversion of the first rate HMS Duke of Wellington (1852) to screw propulsion. That ship had been nearly ready to be launched, but Royal Albert was not that far along and Walker took the time to order the proposed conversion be examined by a committee of shipwrights and engineers that met on 23 September. They concluded that a 400-nhp engine should be used instead and that the stern needed to be completely rebuilt. He approved their recommendations on 5 May 1853, although work had begun earlier. A revised tender for a 500-nhp engine by John Penn and Sons was accepted on 9 January 1854.

The ship measured 232 feet 9 inches (70.9 m) on the gun deck and 193 feet 6 inches (59 m) on the keel. She had a beam of 61 feet (19 m), a depth of hold of 24 feet 2 inches (7.4 m), and a draught of 27 feet 4 inches (8.3 m) at the stern. Royal Albert had a tonnage of 3,726 26/94 tons burthen and displaced 5,517 long tons (5,606 t). Her crew numbered 1,050 officers and ratings. The two-cylinder, horizontal trunk steam engine drove a single propeller shaft. The ship's boilers provided enough steam to produce 1,801 indicated horsepower (1,343 kW) which was enough to give her a maximum speed of 10 knots (19 km/h; 12 mph) during her sea trials on 21 November 1854.

Royal Albert was armed with 121 muzzle-loading, smoothbore guns that consisted of thirty-two 8-inch, 65 cwt, 68-pounder shell guns on her lower gun deck, thirty-two 32-pounder (56 cwt) guns on her middle gun deck and thirty-two 32-pounders on her upper gun deck. Her forecastle and quarterdeck carried a total of twenty-four 42 cwt, 32-pounders and a single 68-pounder (95 cwt) pivot gun.

== Construction and career ==
Named after Prince Albert, Queen Victoria's consort, Royal Albert was the first ship of her name to serve in the RN. Her conversion to screw propulsion began on 25 October 1852 and she was launched on 13 May 1854. The ship was towed to Sheerness for fitting out the following day. Royal Albert was commissioned by Commander Alexander Little on 19 June 1854. He was relieved by Captain Thomas Sabine Pasley in October. She was completed at HM Dockyard, Portsmouth, on 19 November and paid off eight days later. Royal Albert was recommissioned later that month by Captain William Mends and assigned to the Mediterranean Fleet. On 14 February 1855 she became the flagship of Rear-Admiral Edmund Lyons, commander-in-chief of the fleet. On 22 May, the ship was part of the fleet that landed Allied troops near the city of Kerch. The Russian troops in the vicinity withdrew, demolishing the local defences and burning most of their supplies, allowing the Allies to occupy and loot Kerch and Yeni-Kale. The fleet then successfully attacked Taganrog on 3 June with Royal Albert contributing some boats and their crews to the attack. The ship participated in the successful bombardment of the Kinburn Fortress, at the mouth of the Dnieper–Bug estuary, on 17 October.

In late December 1855, she sprang a leak whilst on a voyage from the Crimea to Malta and was beached at San Nicholas, Kea, Greece. She was subsequently refloated and taken in to Malta for repairs. From April 1857 to 20 August 1858 she was commanded by Captain Francis Egerton. From 25 August 1858 to October 1859 she was commanded by Captain Edward Bridges Rice as the flagship of the Channel Squadron under Rear-Admiral Charles Fremantle. She received a new captain on 1 October 1859, Captain Henry James Lacon, and Rear-Admiral Robert Fanshawe took over the Channel Squadron on 10 October 1860. The ship was paid off at Plymouth on 25 January 1861 as unfit for further service. The reconstruction of her stern had used unseasoned timber and was rotten by 1861. Despite this she was reduced to a 107-gun ship while in ordinary. She was sold to Henry Castle & Sons in September 1884 and subsequently demolished at Charlton, London.

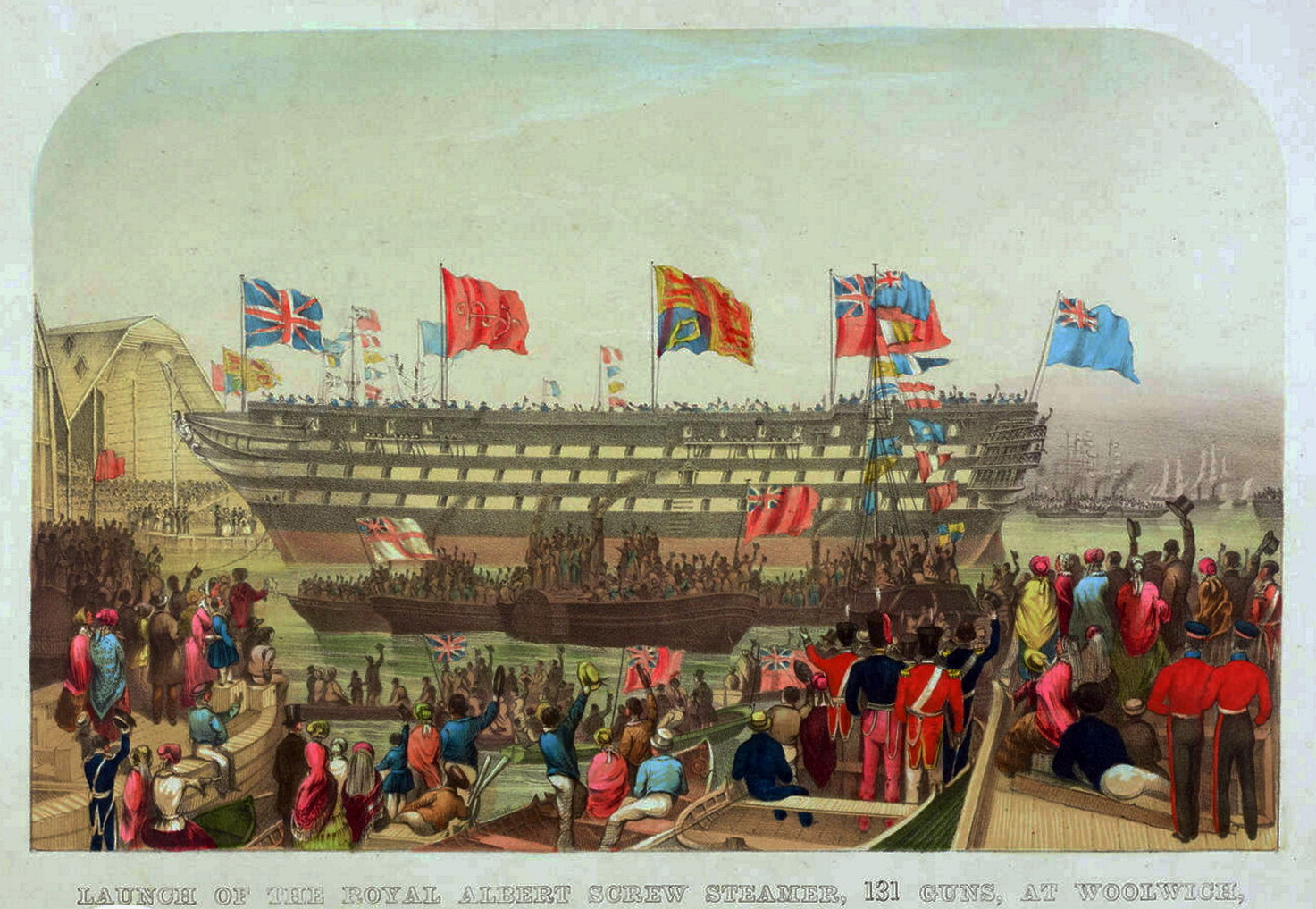
Woolwich Dockyard, launch of Royal Albert, 1854

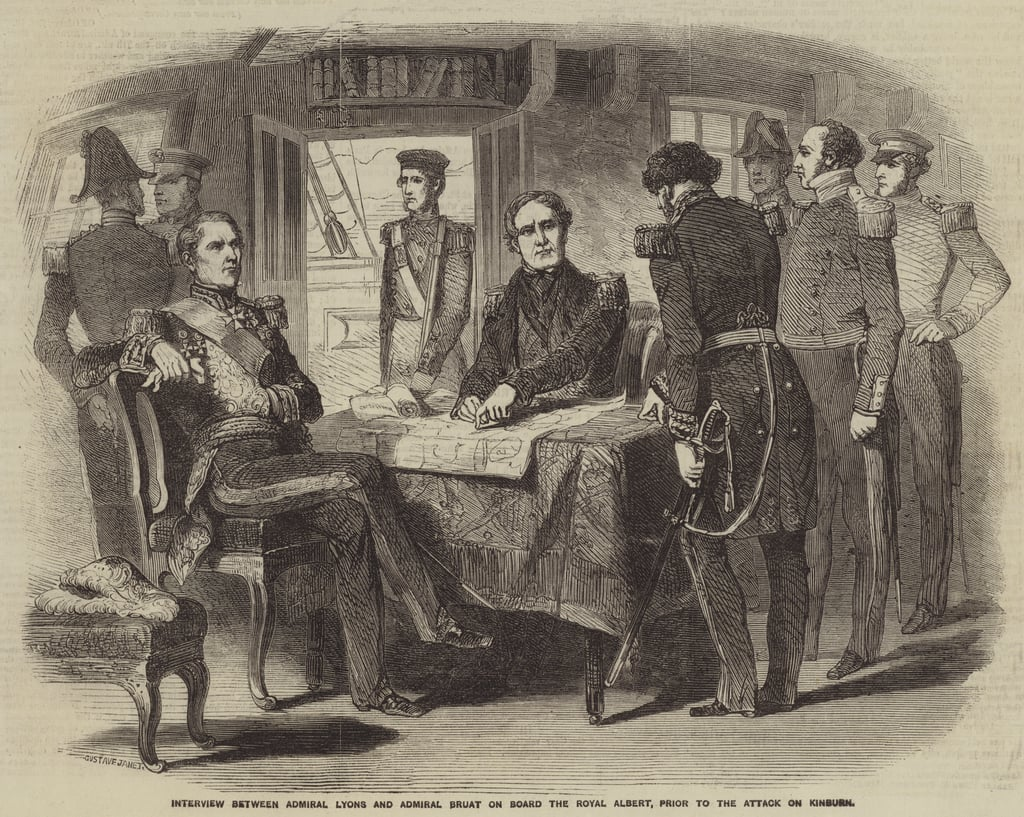
Interview between Admiral Lyons and Admiral Bruat on Board the Royal Albert, prior to the attack on Kinburn, 17 October 1855

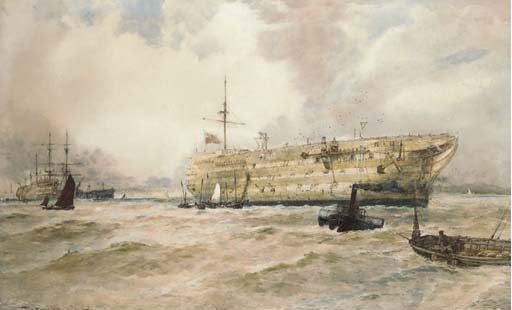
The Royal Albert, hulk, in the Hamoaze, 1890 Thomas Bush Hardy
