= Thomas Sabine Pasley =

Royal Navy Admiral (1804–1884)

Admiral Sir Thomas Sabine Pasley Bt KCB
- Born: 26 December 1804; London, England
- Died: 13 February 1884 (aged 79); Moorhill, Southampton, Hampshire
- Military career
- Allegiance: United Kingdom
- Branch: Royal Navy
- Service years: 1817 to 1869
- Rank: Admiral
- Awards: Knight Commander of the Order of the Bath

Admiral Sir Thomas Sabine Pasley, 2nd Baronet, KCB (26 December 1804 – 13 February 1884) was an English officer of the British Royal Navy during the nineteenth century who never saw action but served across the globe in numerous positions. A career officer, Pasley inherited his grandfather Sir Thomas Pasley, 1st Baronet's title aged only four and spent much of his career in shore appointments as he paid for and cared for his large family.

== Biography ==
Born 26 December 1804, Pasley was the son of Major John Sabine of the Grenadier Guards and Maria Pasley, daughter of Admiral Sir Thomas Pasley, 1st Baronet, a long-serving officer who had lost a leg at the Glorious First of June. As Pasley had no male heirs, his baronetcy would have become extinct but for an act of parliament permitting the title to fall to his grandson on his death. When Pasley senior died in 1808, his four-year-old grandson became Sir Thomas and added the Pasley to his surname.

Young Pasley was schooled at Dr. Pearson's School in East Sheen, Durham School, and by his aunts at Burnfoot, near Langholm. In 1817, aged 14, Pasley attended the Royal Naval Academy and the following year joined Sir Thomas Fremantle's ship HMS Rochfort as a midshipman under the patronage of his relation Pulteney Malcolm. The ship was later commanded by Sir Graham Moore. In 1823, Pasley moved to the brig HMS Redpole and later HMS Arachne. In 1824 he was promoted to lieutenant and joined HMS Tweed for service off the Brazilian Coast.

Returning in 1826, Pasley married Jane Matilda Lily Wynyard and the couple would ultimately have seven sons and two daughters, putting great financial strain on Pasley and once his sons entered the Navy, forcing him to provide patronage for all of them by doing favours for other officers. As a result, his career would stalemate. In 1828, Pasley was promoted to commander and he joined HMS Cameleon and HMS Procris in command. As acting captain he also commanded the frigates HMS Rattlesnake and HMS Blonde.

Pasley was made full captain in 1831, and spent several years on the Brazilian station in HMS Curacoa. In 1848, after a period of unemployment he took over Pembroke Dockyard and in 1856 he was made rear-admiral and commanded HMS Royal Albert and HMS Agamemnon in the Black Sea at the end of the Crimean War. On his return in 1859 Pasley commanded Devonport Dockyard and in 1866 became commander-in-chief at Portsmouth. His lengthy shore commands were the result of the pressures maintaining his large family placed him under.

In 1869, Pasley retired as a full admiral and in 1873 was made a Knight Commander of the Order of the Bath. He died in 1884 and was succeeded in the baronetcy by his grandson Thomas Edward Sabine Pasley, his eldest son having died in 1870. He was buried in Shedfield Churchyard.

== See also ==
- O'Byrne, William Richard (1849). "Pasley, Thomas Sabine" . A Naval Biographical Dictionary . John Murray – via Wikisource.

Military offices
Preceded by Sir Michael Seymour	Commander-in-Chief, Portsmouth; 1866–1869	Succeeded by Sir James Hope
Baronetage of Great Britain
Preceded by Thomas Pasley	Baronet (of Craig); 1808 – 1884	Succeeded by Thomas Sabine Pasley
