= HMS Majestic (1853) =

Ship of the line of the Royal Navy

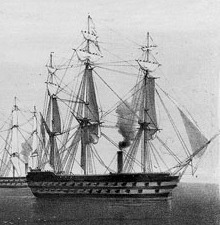
- Majestic becalmed in the Baltic, 1854

History

United Kingdom
- Name: Majestic
- Ordered: 18 March 1839
- Builder: Chatham Dockyard
- Laid down: February 1841
- Launched: 1 December 1853
- Commissioned: 10 February 1854
- Fate: Sold for scrap, April 1867

General characteristics (as completed)
- Class & type: 80-gun, second-rate, Vanguard-class ship of the line
- Displacement: 3,482 long tons (3,538 t)
- Tons burthen: 2,589 61/94 (bm)
- Length: 190 ft (57.9 m) (gun deck)
- Beam: 56 ft 9 in (17.3 m)
- Draught: 25 ft 3 in (7.7 m)
- Depth of hold: 23 ft 4 in (7.1 m)
- Installed power: Boilers; 1,192 ihp (889 kW; 1,209 PS)
- Propulsion: 1 screw; single-expansion steam engine
- Sail plan: Full-rigged ship
- Speed: 8.8 kn (16.3 km/h; 10.1 mph)
- Complement: 750
- Armament: 80 muzzle-loading, smoothbore guns: Lower gun deck: 10 × 8 in (203 mm) shell guns + 18 × 32 pdr guns; Upper gun deck: 4 × 8 in shell guns + 24 × 32 pdr guns; Forecastle & Quarterdeck: 24 × 32 pdr guns

HMS Majestic was an 80-gun, second-rate, Vanguard-class ship of the line, built for the Royal Navy (RN) during the 1850s. She was converted to screw propulsion while still under construction and became the name ship of her subclass. Completed in 1854, the ship played a minor role in Crimean War of 1854–1856 against the Russian Empire, and was then assigned to the Mediterranean Fleet until 1857. Majestic was recommissioned as a guard ship in Liverpool in 1860. Three years later she supported the seizure by HM Customs of two ships ordered by the Confederate States Navy to prevent them from leaving Lairds Shipyard. The ship was paid off for the final time in 1864, sold for scrap in 1867, and broken up the following year.

== Background and description ==
The Vanguard class was designed by the Surveyor of the Navy, William Symonds, with an emphasis on sailing qualities, rather than battle efficiency as they had a quick roll in poor weather that made them bad gun platforms. The ships were intended to measure 190 feet (57.9 m) at the gun deck and 155 feet 3 inches (47.3 m) at the keel. They would have had a beam of 56 feet 9 inches (17.3 m), a depth of hold of 23 feet 4 inches (7.1 m) and had a tonnage of 2,589 81/94 tons burthen. Their crew would have numbered 720 officers and ratings. The ships had the usual three-masted full-ship rig. Their muzzle-loading, smoothbore armament was intended to consist of thirty 32-pounder (56 cwt) guns (Note: "Cwt" is the abbreviation for hundredweight, 56 cwt referring to the weight of the gun.) on the lower gun deck and twenty-eight 50 cwt, 32-pounder guns on the upper gun deck. Between their forecastle and quarterdeck, they would have carried twenty-two 32-pounder (42 cwt) guns.

=== Screw conversion ===
Still under construction, Captain Baldwin Wake Walker, the new Surveyor of the Navy, ordered Majestic to be converted into a screw-propelled ship of the line in 1852 over concerns about the number of French screw ships of the line under construction. To evaluate the effects of the ship's fuller hull form on the propeller's efficiency, the least possible alteration to the stern was to be made and the ship was not to be lengthened as was usually done. However, the fine lines and size of Symonds' Vanguards as the smallest second rates dissuaded Walker from investing in full conversions of the ships. Majestic was the first of the screw conversions of the Vanguard-class ships, and all of the others were modelled upon her. She displaced 3,482 long tons (3,538 t), had a draught of 25 feet 3 inches (7.7 m) and her crew increased to 750 officers and ratings. The ship was fitted with a 400-nominal horsepower, single-expansion steam engine built by Maudslay, Sons and Field that drove a single propeller. Her boilers produced enough steam that the two-cylinder, horizontal engine produced 1,192 indicated horsepower (889 kW) which gave the ship a speed of 8.8 knots (16.3 km/h; 10.1 mph) during her sea trials.

The lower gun deck armament of the converted ships consisted of ten 8 in (203 mm) (65 cwt) shell guns and eighteen (56 cwt) 32-pounders. The upper gun deck had four 8-inch shell guns and twenty-four 32-pounders of 50 cwt. The combined armament of the forecastle and quarterdeck totalled twenty-four 42 cwt 32-pounders.

== Construction and career ==
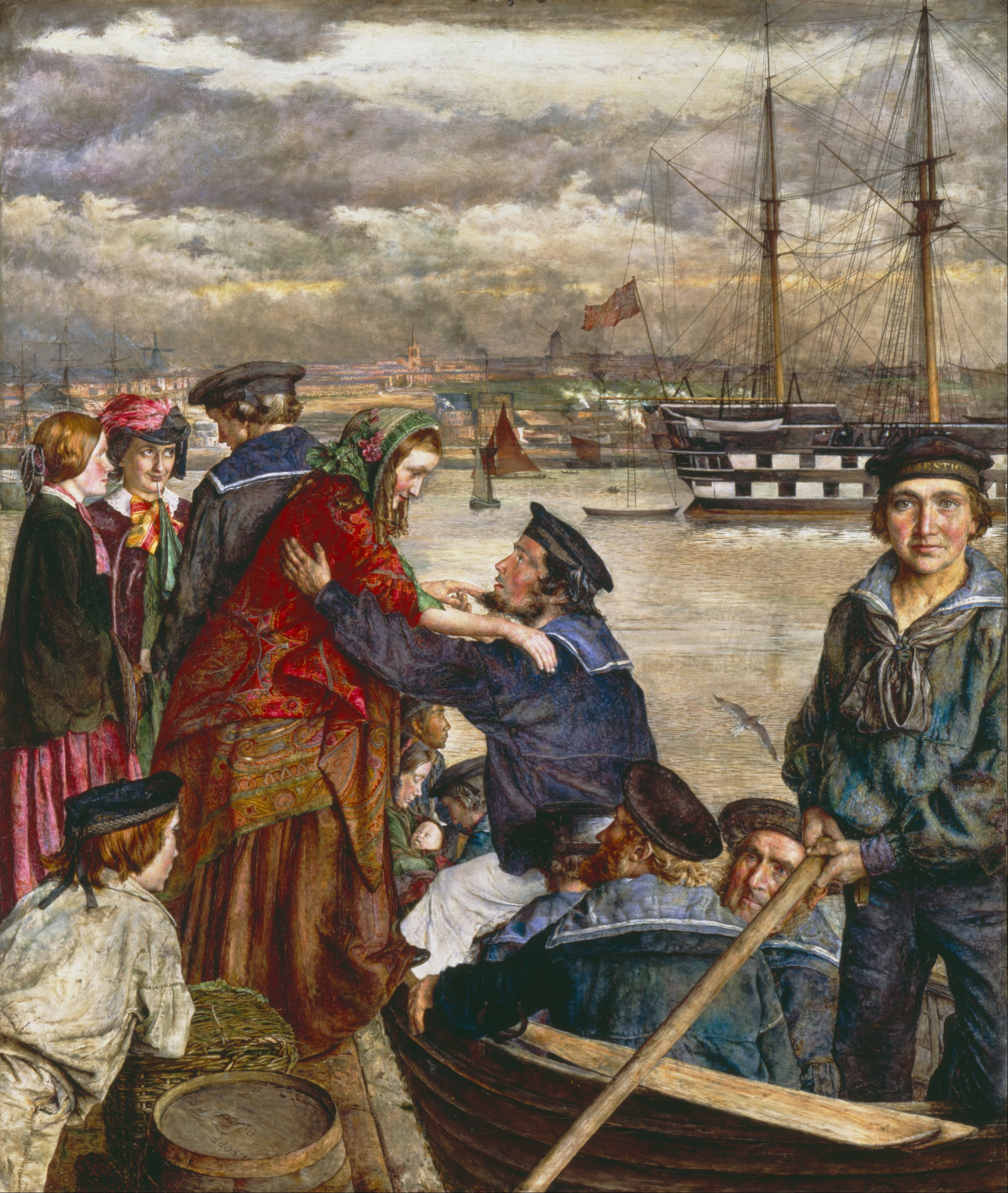
Sweethearts and Wives by John Lee, depicting sailors heading out to duty on HMS Majestic (visible in the upper right) in 1860.

Majestic was the second ship of her name to serve in the RN. Ordered on 18 March 1839, the ship was laid down at Chatham Dockyard in February 1841, but was reordered as a screw-propelled ship on 24 November 1852. Work began five days later and she was launched on 1 December 1853. Majestic was commissioned by Captain James Hope on 10 February 1854 and was completed at Sheerness Dockyard on 22 April. She was assigned to the Baltic Fleet and was present when the fleet rendezvoused with the French fleet on 13 June at Barösund. The ship participated in the reconnaissance of the naval base and fortress of Kronstadt later that month. The ship was part of the force based near Nargen Island (now Naissaar) blockading Reval (now Tallinn) and the southern coast of the Gulf of Finland by late 1854. By 19 October, bad weather had forced the ships to withdraw to Kiel, Germany, where they blockaded the entrance to the Baltic Sea until December when they were ordered home.

The British returned to the Baltic in 1855 with the anchorage at Nargen Island reoccupied on 10 May. Majestic participated in the reconnaissance of Kronstadt in mid-June and remained there for some time. The ship departed Nargen on 11 November and arrived at Kiel three days later, serving as the temporary flagship of Vice-Admiral Richard Dundas, before returning home. Majestic was one of only two ships of the line to reach the Baltic before the Treaty of Paris was signed ending the war on 30 March 1856.

The ship was then transferred to the Mediterranean Fleet, but returned home to be paid off on 15 May 1857. She was recommissioned by Captain William Robert Mends on 1 February 1860 to serve as the guard ship at Liverpool. He was relieved by Captain Edward Inglefield on 1 January 1861. During late 1863 Union informants planted rumours that the Confederate turret ironclad El Toussan then building in Birkenhead under a supposed Egyptian contract might be seized by discharged seamen from the commerce raider CSS Florida during her impending sea trials. Eager to avoid a diplomatic incident with the United States, the Admiralty ordered that Inglefield support customs officials when they were ordered to seize the ships on 9 October. He moved a gunboat to cover the exit from Lairds' fitting-out basin, patrolled the basin at night with his ship's boats and placed a detail of a dozen Royal Marines aboard with orders that no shipyard workers were permitted aboard. Inglefield was relieved in his turn by Captain James Paynter on 14 April 1864. Majestic was paid off on 5 September 1864 and sold to Marshals for scrap in April 1867. The ship was demolished at Plymouth the following year.

== Bibliography ==
- Clowes, William Laird (1901). The Royal Navy: A History from the Earliest Times to the Present. Vol. VI. Sampson Low, Marston.
- Colledge, J. J.; Warlow, Ben & Bush, Steve (2020). Ships of the Royal Navy: The Complete Record of all Fighting Ships of the Royal Navy from the 15th Century to the Present (5th revised and updated ed.). Seaforth Publishing. ISBN 978-1-5267-9327-0.
- Duckers, Peter (2011). The Crimean War at Sea: Naval Campaigns against Russia, 1854-56. Pen & Sword Maritime. ISBN 978-1-84884-267-0.
- English, Andrew R. (2021). The Laird Rams: Britain's Ironclads Built for the Confederacy, 1862–1923. McFarland. ISBN 978-1-4766-8276-1.
- Greenhill, Basil & Giffard, Ann (1988). The British Assault on Finland 1854–1855: A Forgotten Naval War. Naval Institute Press. ISBN 0-87021-057-2.
- Lambert, Andrew D. (1984). Battleships in Transition: The Creation of the Steam Battlefleet 1815-1860. Conway Maritime Press. ISBN 0-85177-315-X.
- Lambert, Andrew (2011) [1990]. The Crimean War: British Grand Strategy Against Russia, 1853–56 (Second ed.). Ashgate. ISBN 978-1-4094-1011-9.
- Winfield, Rif (2014). British Warships in the Age of Sail 1817–1863: Design, Construction, Careers and Fates. Seaforth Publishing. ISBN 978-1-84832-169-4.
