= Paisley South =

Paisley South may refer to:

- Paisley South (UK Parliament constituency)
- Paisley South (Scottish Parliament constituency)
