= HMS Scorpion (1863) =

Ironclad turret ship

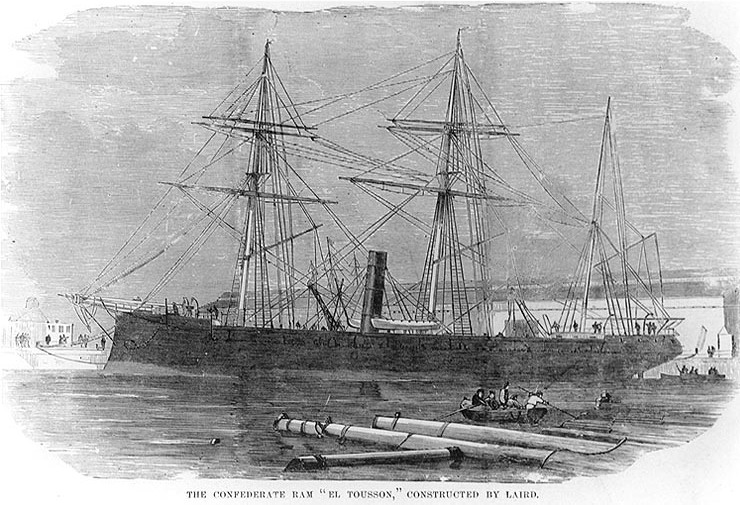
- Engraving of Scorpion

History

United Kingdom
- Name: Scorpion
- Namesake: Scorpion
- Ordered: 1862
- Builder: John Laird Sons & Company, Birkenhead
- Laid down: April 1862
- Launched: 4 July 1863
- Completed: 10 October 1865
- Acquired: September 1863
- Fate: Sunk as target 1901; Refloated 1902; sold for scrap; Foundered 17 June 1903

General characteristics
- Type: Ironclad turret ship
- Displacement: 2,751 long tons (2,795 t)
- Length: 224 ft 6 in (68.4 m) (p/p)
- Beam: 42 ft 4 in (12.9 m)
- Draught: 17 ft (5.2 m) (deep load)
- Installed power: 4 boilers; 1,450 ihp (1,080 kW)
- Propulsion: 2 shafts, 2 direct-acting steam engines
- Sail plan: Barque-rigged
- Speed: 10.5 knots (19.4 km/h; 12.1 mph)
- Range: 1,210 nmi (2,240 km; 1,390 mi) at 10 knots (19 km/h; 12 mph)
- Complement: 153
- Armament: 2 × twin 9 in (229 mm) muzzle-loading rifles
- Armour: Belt: 2–4.5 in (51–114 mm); Gun turrets: 5.5–10 in (140–254 mm)

HMS Scorpion was an ironclad turret ship built by John Laird Sons & Company, at Birkenhead, England. She was one of two sister ships secretly ordered from the Laird shipyard in 1862 by the Confederate States of America. Her true ownership was concealed by the fiction that she was being built for the government of Ottoman Egypt. In October 1863, a few months after their launch and before they could be completed, the UK Government seized the two ironclads.

In 1864 the Admiralty bought them and commissioned them into the Royal Navy: El Tousson as HMS Scorpion and El Monassir as HMS Wivern. Scorpion had a long career as a guard ship at Bermuda, until she was lost in the North Atlantic in 1903.

== Design and description ==
North Carolina and her sister were intended, together with other warships, to break the Federal blockade of Confederate coastal cities and to hold some Northern cities for ransom. The ships had a length between perpendiculars of 224 feet 6 inches (68.4 m), a beam of 42 feet 4 inches (12.9 m), and a draught of 17 feet (5.2 m) at deep load. They displaced 2,751 long tons (2,795 t). The hull was divided by 12 watertight bulkheads and the ships had a double bottom beneath the engine and boiler rooms. Their crew consisted of 152 officers and ratings.

The Scorpion-class ships had two horizontal, direct-acting steam engines, also built by John Laird, Sons & Co., of 350 nominal horsepower. Each engine driving a single propeller shaft using steam provided by four tubular boilers. Scorpion's engines produced a total of 1,455 indicated horsepower (1,085 kW) during her sea trials which gave the ship a maximum speed of 10.5 knots (19.4 km/h; 12.1 mph). The ships carried 336 long tons (341 t) of coal, enough to steam 1,210 nautical miles (2,240 km; 1,390 mi) at 10 knots (19 km/h; 12 mph). They were barque-rigged with three masts. The funnel was made semi-retractable to reduce wind resistance while under sail. To improve seaworthiness, the ships were built with a forecastle and a poop deck, although these greatly restricted the guns' ability to fire forward or aft. Amidships, they only had a freeboard of 4 feet 7 inches (1.4 m), so John Laird, Sons & Co. designed hinged iron bulwarks 2 inches (51 mm) thick that would be lowered in combat to allow the guns to shoot.

No ordnance had been ordered by the Confederates before the ships were seized in 1863, but in British service they mounted a pair of 9-inch rifled muzzle-loading guns in each turret. The guns could fire both solid shot and explosive shells.

The Scorpion-class ships had a complete waterline belt of wrought iron that was 4.5 inches (114 mm) thick amidships and thinned to 3 inches (76 mm) at the bow and 2.5 inches (64 mm) at the stern. It completely covered the hull from the upper deck to 3 feet 3 inches (0.99 m) below the waterline. The armour protection of the turrets was quite elaborate. The inside of the turret was lined with .5 inches (12.7 mm) of iron boiler plate to which T-shaped beams were bolted. The space between the beams was filled with 10 inches (254 mm) of teak. This was covered by an iron lattice .75 inches (19.1 mm) thick that was covered in turn by 8 inches (203 mm) of teak. The 5.5-inch (140 mm) iron plates were bolted to the outside using bolts that ran through to the interior iron "skin". The area around the gun ports was reinforced by 4.5-inch plates to give a total thickness of 10 inches. The turret roof consisted of T-shaped beams covered by 1-inch (25 mm) iron plates.

== Construction and career ==
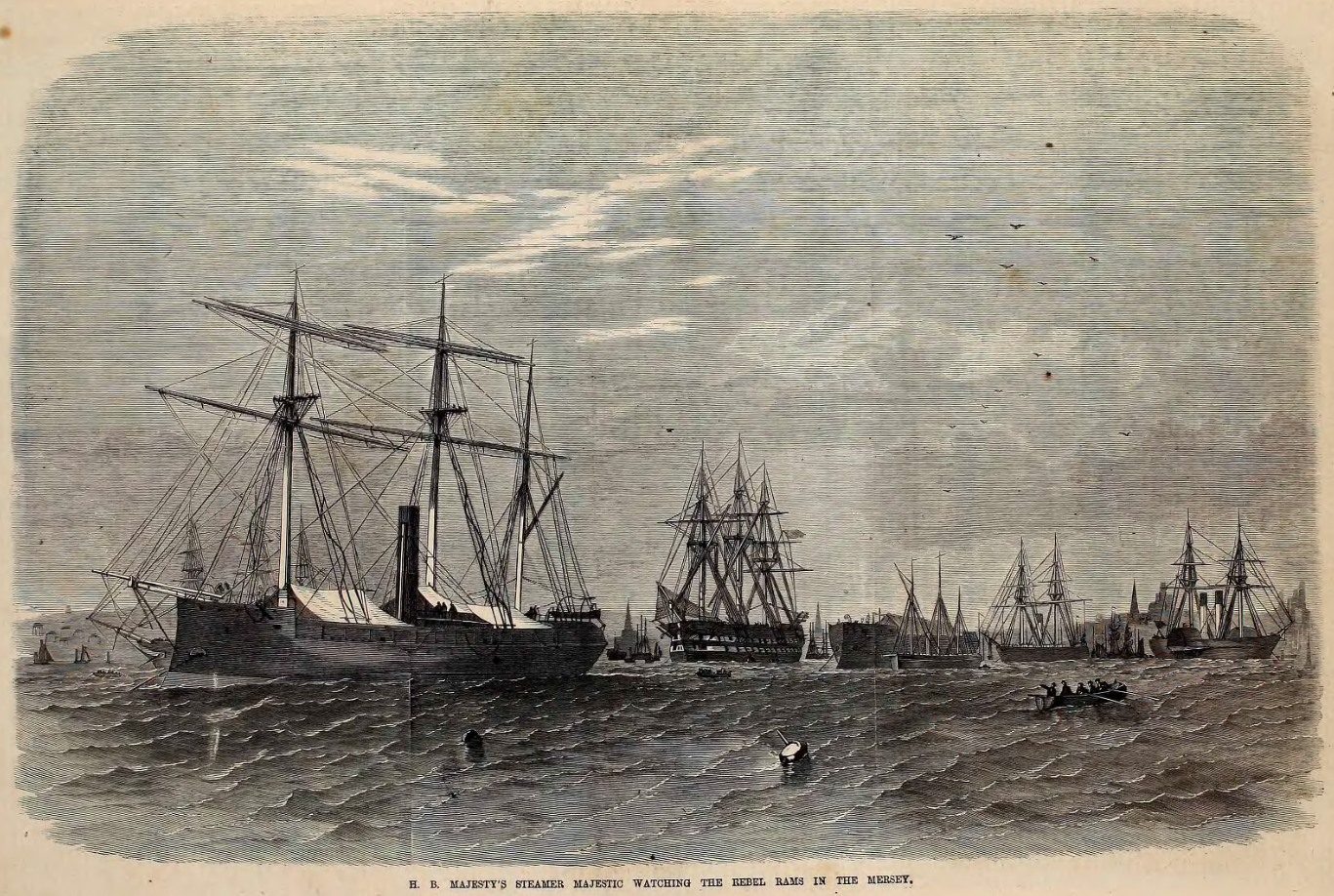
H.B. Majesty's steamer Majestic watching the rebel rams in the Mersey, 1863. Tousson, far left.

The Confederate States Navy ordered Scorpion from Laird Brothers in April 1862 as the Egyptian warship El Tousson. She was to have been named CSS North Carolina upon delivery to the Confederacy. The ship was launched from their shipyard in Birkenhead on 4 July 1863. Shortly afterwards Union informants planted rumours that the ship might be seized by discharged seamen from the commerce raider CSS Florida during her impending sea trials. Eager to avoid a diplomatic incident with the United States, the Admiralty ordered Captain Edward Inglefield of the ship of the line, HMS Majestic, to support HM Customs when they were ordered to seize the ships on 9 October. He moved a gunboat to cover the exit from Lairds' fitting-out basin, patrolled the basin at night with his ship's boats and placed a detail of a dozen Royal Marines aboard with orders that no shipyard workers were permitted aboard.

On 20 May 1864, the Admiralty purchased the ship for the Royal Navy and named El Tousson after the Roman-era siege weapon, Scorpion was the sixth ship of her name to serve in the RN. The installation of her armament was delayed when the ship carrying her guns ran aground on the eastern coast of Ireland in late February 1865, although the slides for the gun carriages were mounted. En route to HM Dockyard, Portsmouth, with a temporary crew from HMS Donegal, she accidentally collided with the merchant ship Theresa Tittens south of Holyhead early on the morning of 23 March. The ironclad had six feet of her forecastle crushed while the civilian ship had some planking damaged and some rigging torn away. No one was injured in the collision.

Commissioned in July 1865, the ship was assigned to the Channel Fleet until 1869, with time out for a refit that reduced her sailing rig from a bark to a schooner. In late 1869, she moved to Bermuda for coast and harbour defence service. Scorpion remained there for over three decades before being removed from the effective list. Scorpion was sunk as a target in 1901 but raised the next year and sold in February 1903. She was lost at sea while under tow to the U.S., where she was to be scrapped.
