= HMS Wivern (1863) =

Ironclad turret ship

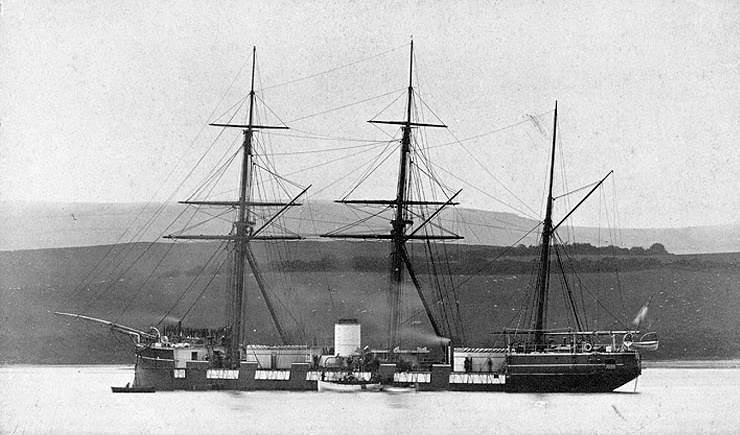
- HMS Wivern in 1865

History

United Kingdom
- Name: HMS Wivern
- Namesake: Variant spelling of wyvern
- Ordered: 1862
- Builder: John Laird Sons & Company, Birkenhead
- Laid down: April 1862
- Launched: 29 August 1863
- Completed: 10 October 1865
- Fate: Sold for scrap, 1922

General characteristics
- Type: Ironclad turret ship
- Displacement: 2,751 long tons (2,795 t)
- Length: 224 ft 6 in (68.4 m) (p/p)
- Beam: 42 ft 4 in (12.9 m)
- Draught: 17 ft (5.2 m) (deep load)
- Installed power: 4 boilers; 1,450 ihp (1,080 kW)
- Propulsion: 2 shafts; 2 direct-acting steam engines
- Sail plan: Barque-rigged
- Speed: 10.5 knots (19.4 km/h; 12.1 mph)
- Range: 1,210 nmi (2,240 km; 1,390 mi) at 10 kn (19 km/h; 12 mph)
- Complement: 153
- Armament: 2 × twin 9 in (229 mm) muzzle-loading rifles
- Armour: Belt: 2–4.5 in (51–114 mm); Gun turrets: 5.5–10 in (140–254 mm)

The first HMS Wivern was an ironclad turret ship built at Birkenhead, England. She was one of two sister ships secretly ordered from the John Laird Sons & Company shipyard in 1862 by the Confederate States of America.

Her true ownership was concealed by the fiction that she was being built as the Egyptian warship El Monassir. She was to have been named CSS Mississippi upon delivery to the Confederacy. Her sister was built under the false name El Tousson and was to have been renamed CSS North Carolina. In October 1863, a few months after their launch and before they could be completed, the UK Government seized the two ironclads.

In 1864, the Admiralty bought them and commissioned them into the Royal Navy: El Monassir as HMS Wivern and El Tousson as HMS Scorpion. Wivern had a long Royal Navy career, until she was scrapped in Hong Kong in 1922.

== Design and description ==
Mississippi and her sister were intended, together with other warships, to break the Federal blockade of Confederate coastal cities and to hold some Northern cities for ransom. The ships had a length between perpendiculars of 224 feet 6 inches (68.4 m), a beam of 42 feet 4 inches (12.9 m), and a draught of 17 feet (5.2 m) at deep load. They displaced 2,751 long tons (2,795 t). The hull was divided by 12 watertight bulkheads and the ships had a double bottom beneath the engine and boiler rooms. Their crew consisted of 152 officers and ratings.

The Scorpion-class ships had two horizontal direct-acting steam engines, built by Lairds, each driving a single propeller shaft, using steam provided by four tubular boilers. The engines produced a total of 1,450 indicated horsepower (1,080 kW) which gave the ships a maximum speed of 10.5 knots (19.4 km/h; 12.1 mph). Wivern reached a maximum speed just over 11 knots (20 km/h; 13 mph) during her sea trials on 4 October 1865. The ships carried 336 long tons (341 t) of coal, enough to steam 1,210 nautical miles (2,240 km; 1,390 mi) at 10 knots (19 km/h; 12 mph). They were barque-rigged with three masts. Wivern was the first ship to have tripod masts to reduce interference with the firing arcs of the gun turrets. The funnel was made semi-retractable to reduce wind resistance while under sail.

No ordnance had been ordered by the Confederates before the ships were seized in 1863, but in British service they mounted a pair of 9-inch rifled muzzle-loading guns in each turret. The guns could fire both solid shot and explosive shells. According to Parkes, going from full depression to full elevation supposedly took one hour in smooth water and with an even keel!

The Scorpion-class ships had a complete waterline belt of wrought iron that was 4.5 inches (114 mm) thick amidships and thinned to 3 inches (76 mm) at the bow and 2.5 inches (64 mm) at the stern. It completely covered the hull from the upper deck to 3 feet 3 inches (0.99 m) below the waterline. The armour protection of the turrets was quite elaborate. The inside of the turret was lined with .5 inches (12.7 mm) of iron boiler plate to which T-shaped beams were bolted. The space between the beams was filled with 10 inches (254 mm) of teak. This was covered by an iron lattice .75 inches (19.1 mm) thick that was covered in turn by 8 inches (203 mm) of teak. The 5.5-inch (140 mm) iron plates were bolted to the outside using bolts that ran through to the interior iron "skin". The area around the gun ports was reinforced by 4.5-inch plates to give a total thickness of 10 inches. The turret roof consisted of T-shaped beams covered by 1-inch (25 mm) iron plates.

== Construction and career ==
The British government seized the pair of ironclads in October 1863, before they could be completed. In early 1864, the Admiralty purchased both for the Royal Navy. Completed in October 1865, Wivern was assigned to the Channel Fleet until 1868. After a refit that reduced her sailing rig from a barque to a schooner, the ship served briefly as a guard ship at Hull and then went into reserve. In 1880 she was dispatched to Hong Kong to serve as the station guard ship there.

The naval architect Edward James Reed wrote: "the turret-ship 'Wivern', belonging to the Royal Navy, has a low free-board (about 4 feet), and is very lightly armoured, while her armament is also very light. Yet on one occasion her behaviour at sea was so bad that she had to be brought head to wind in order to prevent her shipping large, and, of course, dangerous, quantities of water, the extreme angle of roll rising to 27 degrees each way."

One of her commanding officers was Captain Hugh Talbot Burgoyne, VC, who was later appointed the commanding officer of HMS Captain. Wivern remained in Hong Kong until sold for scrap in 1922, having been reduced to harbor duties from 1904.
