= Pasley baronets =

Title in the Baronetage of Great Britain

The Pasley baronetcy, of Craig, near Langholm, in the County of Dumfries, is a title in the Baronetage of Great Britain. It was created on 1 September 1794 for the Scottish naval commander Thomas Pasley, with special remainder to the male issue of his daughters. On his death in 1808 he was succeeded under the remainder by his grandson Thomas Sabine, who the following year assumed by Royal Licence the surname of Pasley in lieu of his patronymic; he was also a naval commander.

The 5th Baronet was a literary scholar and Fellow of the British Academy. The family surname is pronounced "Paisley".

== Pasley baronets, of Craig (1794) ==
- Sir Thomas Pasley, 1st Baronet (1734–1808)
- Sir Thomas Sabine Pasley, 2nd Baronet (1804–1884)
- Sir Thomas Edward Sabine Pasley, 3rd Baronet (1863–1947)
- Sir Rodney Marshall Sabine Pasley, 4th Baronet (1899–1982)
- Sir (John) Malcolm Sabine Pasley, 5th Baronet (1926–2004)
- Sir Robert Killigrew Sabine Pasley, 6th Baronet (born 1965)

The heir apparent is Henry Malcolm Sabine Pasley (born 2009).

Baronetage of Great Britain
Preceded by Saxton baronets	Pasley baronets of Craig; 1 September 1794	Succeeded by Bowyer baronets
