= Paisley Islet =

Island in South Australia

Coordinates: 35°54′S 136°32′E

Geography
- Location: Great Australian Bight

Administration
- Australia

Demographics
- Population: 0

Paisley Islet (also known as West Bay Islet) is an islet located in the Great Australian Bight immediately off the west coast of Kangaroo Island in South Australia approximately 104 kilometres (65 miles) west south-west of Kingscote. It is currently part of the Flinders Chase National Park.

== Description ==
Paisley Islet is approximately 104 kilometres (65 miles) west south-west of Kingscote. It is an extension of the southern headland of West Bay and is only separated from the mainland by tide or wind driven waves. It can be reached by walking along the rock isthmus at low tide.

== Formation, geology and oceanography ==
Paisley Islet was formed about 7500 years ago after sea levels rose at the start of the Holocene. The islet consists of basement rock of Kanmantoo group metasandstone which extends to the mainland. The central portion of the islet is topped with a layer of Bridgewater Formation calcarenite which is in turn capped with a layer of calcrete. Layers of soil lie in depressions within the calcrete layer. The islet is located in waters of a depth of about 9.1 metres (30 feet) that partially conceal wave-cut platforms and that are subject to rolling seas.

== Flora and fauna ==
As of 1996, the rim of the calcarenite cap has been colonised by roundleaved pigface, and sea celery. Species found on the central portion of the islet included dwarfed marsh saltbush, nitre-bush, southern sea-heath and ruby saltbush. Species such as feather spear-grass and variable groundsel appear after seasonal rain. Vertebrate animals were represented by birds, mammals and reptiles. A survey conducted in 1996 found that the islet is used as a breeding site, possibly during milder weather, for crested terns and as a site for roosting and feeding by red-capped dotterels, sooty oystercatchers, rock parrots, welcome swallows and Australian pipit. It was also observed that the islet was being used as a haul out by bull Australian sea lions. The four-toed earless skink was the only reptile found in 1996.

== Protected area status ==
The islet is part of the Flinders Chase National Park and has been specifically proclaimed as a prohibited area in order to protect breeding seabirds such as crested terns. Since December 2012, the waters around the islet has been part of a habitat protection zone located within the boundaries of the Western Kangaroo Island Marine Park.
