= Sir Thomas Pasley, 1st Baronet =

Royal Navy Admiral (1734–1808)

Admiral Sir Thomas Pasley Bt
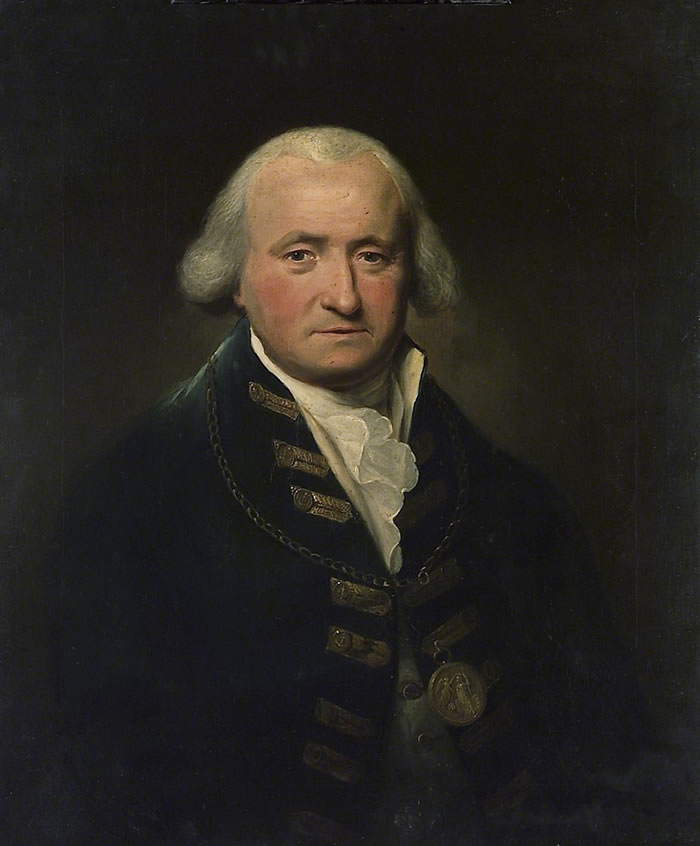
- 1795 portrait of Pasley by Lemuel Francis Abbott
- Born: 2 March 1734; Langholm, Dumfriesshire
- Died: 29 November 1808 (aged 74); Winchester, Hampshire
- Military career
- Allegiance: Great Britain; United Kingdom
- Branch: Royal Navy
- Service years: 1751–1801
- Rank: Admiral
- Commands: Nore Command; Plymouth Command
- Conflicts: Seven Years' War; Sinking of Alcyon; Action off the Isle of Man; American Revolutionary War; Battle of Porto Praya; Battle of Saldanha Bay (1781); Action off Havana; French Revolutionary Wars; Glorious First of June
- Awards: Baronetcy

Admiral Sir Thomas Pasley, 1st Baronet (2 March 1734 – 29 November 1808) was a Royal Navy officer who served in the Seven Years' War, American Revolutionary War and French Revolutionary Wars. In his youth he was renowned as an efficient and able frigate officer and in later life became a highly respected squadron commander in the Channel Fleet. It was during the latter service when he was awarded his baronetcy after losing a leg at the Glorious First of June, aged 60.

== Early career ==
Thomas Pasley was born in 1734 to James Pasley (1695–1773), of Craig, Dumfries and his wife Magdalene, daughter of Robert Elliott, of Middlehomehill, Roxburghshire. Thomas was the fifth of the eleven Pasley children, a family of minor landowners in the village of Craig, near Langholm, Dumfriesshire. He was the brother of Gilbert Pasley (1733–1781), Surgeon-General of Madras, and Margaret, mother of Sir John Malcolm. Gilbert's daughter, Eliza, married Sir Robert Campbell (1771–1858) 1st Bt., of Carrick Buoy, County Donegal, a director of the East India Company and a commissioner for the lieutenancy of London.

Thomas entered the Royal Navy in 1751 aged 16, and served as a midshipman aboard the sixth-rate frigate HMS Garland. Pasley's first captain was Maurice Suckling, who commanded him in the sloop HMS Weazel off Jamaica. Pasley later moved to the ship of the line HMS Dreadnought under Robert Digby, who was impressed enough with the young officer to bring him along when Digby was transferred to HMS Bideford in 1757.

== Seven Years' War ==
On Bideford, Pasley served as temporary lieutenant on a bullion convoy operation from the West Indies to Britain. As the Seven Years' War had broken out the year before, the mission to carry £3,000 across the Atlantic was dangerous, but Bideford crossed safely and Pasley personally escorted the gold to London, being officially promoted to lieutenant shortly afterwards. Pasley continued to serve with Digby after his promotion, joining the ship of the line HMS Dunkirk on the Siege of Rochefort, when a British combined naval and land force failed disastrously to capture the strategic French port.

Pasley took his first solo command later in the year with the small fireship HMS Roman Emperor, but he soon requested service on a bigger ship, joining his cousin John Elliot, who was captain of the frigate HMS Hussar. In November, Elliot used his small ship to destroy the 50-gun French fourth-rate Alcyon, and in early 1758 he captured the French privateer Vengeance. The two officers later moved to the larger frigate HMS Aeolus and in 1759 captured the corvette Mignonne from within Brest Roads.

In 1760, Aeolus was blown off course during blockade duties off France and put in to reprovision at Kinsale. There Elliot heard a rumour of a French invasion force landing at Carrickfergus and put to sea in the hope of intercepting the enemy squadron. Aeolus was joined by HMS Brilliant and HMS Pallas and the three frigates attacked the French squadron under François Thurot off the Isle of Man. In a sharp encounter, all three French ships were lost, Pasley leading the charge aboard Thurot's flagship Marischal de Belle Isle which captured the vessel and during which Thurot was killed. Pasley became first lieutenant as a result of this action and spent the remained of the war on Aeolus in the English Channel and subsequently off the Spanish coast on commerce raiding activities. The action of 28 February was depicted in a painting by Liverpool marine artist, Richard Wright.

In 1762, with the war coming to a close, Pasley was made commander and given the small ship HMS Albany with which to convoy merchant ships across the Irish Sea. At the pace in 1763 he retained this duty in the 8-gun HMS Ranger and was also employed in seizing smugglers between the islands. In 1769, Pasley joined HMS Weazel which was tasked with transporting structural engineers to the Guinea coast. Arriving in the worst of the wet season, Weazel soon became infested with malaria and all four engineers and the majority of the crew succumbed and died in a short period. So depleted was Weazel's crew that Pasley was forced to impress sailors from West African merchant ships in order to return to Britain safely.

== American Revolutionary War ==
After briefly serving on HMS Pomona in 1771, Pasley was promoted to post captain and took command of HMS Seahorse in the West Indies. In 1772 he returned to Britain on half-pay and married Mary Heywood, daughter of the chief justice of the Isle of Man. The marriage was a love match and the couple had two daughters. Pasley remained on half-pay until the American Revolutionary War in 1776, when he was given command of the post-ship HMS Glasgow.

Pasley's first duty was escorting a convoy to the West Indies, which he did swiftly and successfully, his wife being presented with plate in reward for his services. He remained on the Jamaica station for the next two years, capturing numerous enemy ships and making a substantial amount in prize money. He returned in 1778 and was placed in command of the half finished HMS Sybil, which was launched in 1779. In her he cruised off Cape St Vincent and later guided a convoy to Newfoundland and a second one back safely. In 1780 he sailed for the Cape of Good Hope and brought back all the documentation and several survivors from Captain James Cook's expedition to the Pacific, including Nathaniel Portlock.

For these services, Pasley was given the 50-gun HMS Jupiter and in her served in several squadrons and actions, fighting the French at the Battle of Porto Praya under George Johnstone and capturing a Dutch squadron at the Battle of Saldanha Bay (1781). On both occasions Pasley was directly responsible for destroying or capturing numerous enemy war vessels and merchant ships. In 1782 he convoyed Admiral Hugh Pigot to the West Indies and then cruised off Havana, destroying seven merchants from a convoy and then driving off two Spanish ships of the line when they tried to intervene. At the war's conclusion in 1783, Jupiter was paid off and Pasley returned to half-pay.

== French Revolutionary Wars ==
In 1788, Pasley's wife died and he rejoined the service as commander in chief at the Medway. Henrietta Flinders was appointed as governess to the children. She persuaded Captain Pasley to secure a first naval posting for her brother, Matthew Flinders in 1789. Pasley served in HMS Vengeance and HMS Bellerophon until in 1794 at the start of the French Revolutionary Wars, he was made rear-admiral. Remaining in Bellerophon, Pasley commanded the van squadron of the British fleet during the Atlantic campaign of May 1794 and led the action on 28 May. Further engaged on 29 May, Pasley was seriously wounded in the general action of the Glorious First of June when Lord Howe's fleet defeated Villaret de Joyeuse's French. Pasley's leg was torn off by cannon shot and he retired below early in the action. his life being saved by emergency surgery.

Pasley did not serve in a seagoing capacity again, but was rewarded with promotion, over £1,500 worth of gifts, a baronetcy and numerous other awards. He was later promoted again, and became Commander-in-Chief, The Nore in 1798. In March 1799 he became Commander-in-Chief, Plymouth, but his age and wound prevented active service and he retired in 1801 as a full admiral. Pasley died in 1808 at his estate near Winchester of dropsy. Although he had no male heirs, his baronetcy and estate were passed by special provision to his grandson Thomas Sabine Pasley, later an admiral in his own right.

Military offices
Preceded by Skeffington Lutwidge	Commander-in-Chief, The Nore; 1798–1799	Succeeded by Alexander Graeme
Preceded by Sir Richard Onslow	Commander-in-Chief, Plymouth; 1799–1802	Succeeded by Sir James Dacres
Baronetage of Great Britain
New creation	Baronet (of Craig); 1794–1808	Succeeded by Thomas Sabine Pasley
