= The Complete Stories of Franz Kafka =

Book by Franz Kafka

The Complete Stories
- First edition
- Author: Franz Kafka
- Translator: Willa and Edwin Muir, Tania and James Stern
- Language: English
- Genre: short Stories
- Publisher: Schocken Books
- Publication date: 1971
- Publication place: United States
- Media type: Print (hardback & paperback)
- Pages: 487 p.
- ISBN: 0-8052-3419-5
- OCLC: 190590
- Dewey Decimal: 833/.9/12
- LC Class: PZ3.K11 Co PT2621.A26

The Complete Stories of Franz Kafka is a compilation of all of Kafka's short stories. With the exception of three novels (The Trial, The Castle and Amerika), this collection includes all of his narrative work. The book was originally edited by Nahum N. Glatzer and published by Schocken Books in 1971. It was reprinted in 1995 with an introduction by John Updike.

The collection includes all the works published during Kafka's lifetime, with the exception of The Stoker which is usually incorporated as the first chapter of his unfinished novel Amerika. Some of the stories included in the book are fragmented or in various states of incompletion. Most of the stories are translated by Willa and Edwin Muir, with occasional translations by Tania and James Stern.

Several fables, parables and philosophical pieces are not included in this collection, as they were never meant to be independent stories or never intended for publication. These can be found in Kafka's diaries, notebooks and letters.

== Contents ==
Foreword by John Updike (1983 edition)

=== Two Introductory Parables ===
- "Before the Law" from the ninth chapter of the novel The Trial
- "An Imperial Message" from the short story "The Great Wall of China"

=== The Longer Stories ===
- Description of a Struggle
- Wedding Preparations in the Country
- The Judgment
- The Metamorphosis
- In the Penal Colony
- The Village Schoolmaster (The Giant Mole)
- Blumfeld, an Elderly Bachelor
- The Warden of the Tomb
- A Country Doctor
- The Hunter Gracchus + fragment
- The Great Wall of China + fragment
- A Report to an Academy + two fragments
- The Refusal
- A Hunger Artist
- Investigations of a Dog
- A Little Woman
- The Burrow
- Josephine the Singer, or The Mouse Folk

=== The Shorter Stories ===
- Children on a Country Road
- The Trees
- Clothes
- Excursion into the Mountains
- The Rejection
- The Street Window
- The Tradesman
- Absent-minded Window-gazing
- The Way Home
- Passers-by
- On the Tram
- Reflections for Gentlemen-Jockeys
- The Wish to be a Red Indian
- Unhappiness
- Bachelor's Ill Luck
- Unmasking a Confidence Trickster
- The Sudden Walk
- Resolutions
- A Dream
- Up in the Gallery
- A Fratricide
- The Next Village
- A Visit to a Mine
- Jackals and Arabs
- The Bridge
- The Bucket Rider
- The New Advocate
- An Old Manuscript
- The Knock at the Manor Gate
- Eleven Sons
- My Neighbor
- A Crossbreed
- The Cares of a Family Man
- A Common Confusion
- The Truth about Sancho Panza
- The Silence of the Sirens
- Prometheus
- The City Coat of Arms
- Poseidon
- Fellowship
- At Night
- The Problem of Our Laws
- The Conscription of Troops
- The Test
- The Vulture
- The Helmsman
- The Top
- A Little Fable
- Home-Coming
- First Sorrow
- The Departure
- Advocates
- The Married Couple
- Give it Up!
- On Parables

=== Postscript ===
By Nahum N. Glatzer

=== Bibliography ===
- Kafka's stories and collections of stories published during his lifetime
- Kafka's works published after his death
- Collected works in German
- Schocken editions of Kafka's works in English
- Other editions of Kafka's works in English
- Supplement

=== On the material included in this volume ===
Notes on the writing and publication history of the stories and fragments.

=== Chronology ===
Chronology of Kafka's life and writing.

=== Selected writings on Kafka ===
A list of critical and biographical essays on Kafka.

== See also ==
- Franz Kafka bibliography

== Notes ==
- The first eighteen of "The Shorter Stories" are usually grouped under the title Contemplation (Betrachtung), or Meditation .

== Editions ==
- Kafka, Franz (ed. Nahum N. Glatzer). The Complete Stories. New York: Schocken Books, 1971 (Hardcover) ISBN 0-8052-3419-5, 1988 (Paperback) ISBN 0-8052-0873-9
- Kafka, Franz (ed. Nahum N. Glatzer). The Complete Stories. New York: Schocken Books, 1995. With a foreword by John Updike ISBN 0-8052-1055-5 (Paperback)
