= Description of a Struggle (short story collection) =

- First edition
- Author: Franz Kafka
- Translator: Tania and James Stern
- Language: English
- Genre: Short storyies
- Publisher: Schocken Books
- Publication date: 1958
- Publication place: United States

Description of a Struggle is a collection of short stories and story fragments by Franz Kafka.

First published in Germany in 1936 as Beschreibung eines Kampfes after Kafka's death by Max Brod, it was translated by Tania and James Stern and published in 1958 by Schocken Books.

== Contents ==
- Description of a Struggle
- Blumfeld, an Elderly Bachelor
- The Warden of the Tomb
- The Refusal
- Short pieces:
  - Poseidon
  - The Vulture
  - The Departure
  - Give It Up!
  - At Night
  - The Helmsman
  - The Top
  - The Test
  - Advocates
  - Home-Coming
  - Fellowship
  - Fragments of A Report to an Academy
  - Fragment of The Great Wall of China
  - The Conscription of Troops
  - Fragment of The Hunter Gracchus

== Printings ==
Kafka, Franz. Description of a Struggle. New York: Schocken Books, 1958.

== See also ==
- Franz Kafka
