= The Great Wall of China (short story collection) =

1931 short story collection by Franz Kafka

- First edition
- Author: Franz Kafka
- Original title: Beim Bau der Chinesischen Mauer
- Translator: Willa and Edwin Muir
- Language: German
- Genre: Short stories
- Publisher: Gustav Kiepenheuer Verlag
- Publication date: 1931
- English publication date: 1933 London, Martin Secker; 1946 New York, Schocken Books
- Media type: Print (hardback)
- Pages: xvi+285
- Original text: Beim Bau der Chinesischen Mauer at German Wikisource

The Great Wall of China (German: Beim Bau der Chinesischen Mauer [While building the Chinese wall]) is the first posthumous collection of short stories by Franz Kafka published in Germany in 1931. It was edited by Max Brod and Hans-Joachim Schoeps and collected previously unpublished short stories, incomplete stories, fragments and aphorisms written by Kafka between 1917 and 1924. The first English translation by Willa and Edwin Muir was published by Martin Secker in 1933. The same translation was published in 1946 by Schocken Books.

== Contents ==
- Introductory note by Edwin Muir
- Longer Stories
  - Investigations of a Dog
  - The Burrow
  - The Great Wall of China
  - The Giant Mole
- Short Stories and Fables
  - The Hunter Gracchus
  - The Married Couple
  - My Neighbor
  - A Common Confusion
  - The Bridge
  - The Bucket Rider
  - A Crossbreed
  - The Knock at the Manor Gate
  - The City Coat of Arms
  - The Silence of the Sirens
  - Prometheus
  - The Truth about Sancho Panza
  - The Problem of Our Laws
  - On Parables
  - A Little Fable
- Aphorisms
  - "He"
  - Reflections on Sin, Pain, Hope, and the True Way (collection The Zürau Aphorisms, 109 entries from The Blue Octavo Notebooks)

== Publication history (in English) ==
- 1933 London: Martin Secker, xvi+285 pp., hardcover; first UK edition, subtitled and Other Pieces
- 1946 London: Secker and Warburg, 159 pp., hardcover; Revised and reset edition
- 1946 New York: Schocken Books, xix+315 pp., hardcover; first US edition, subtitled Stories and Reflections
