= Description of a Struggle =

- Short story by Franz Kafka
- Original title: Beschreibung eines Kampfes
- Country: Germany
- Language: German

Publication
- Published in: Betrachtung
- Publication type: Anthology
- Publisher: Rowohlt Verlag
- Publication date: 1912

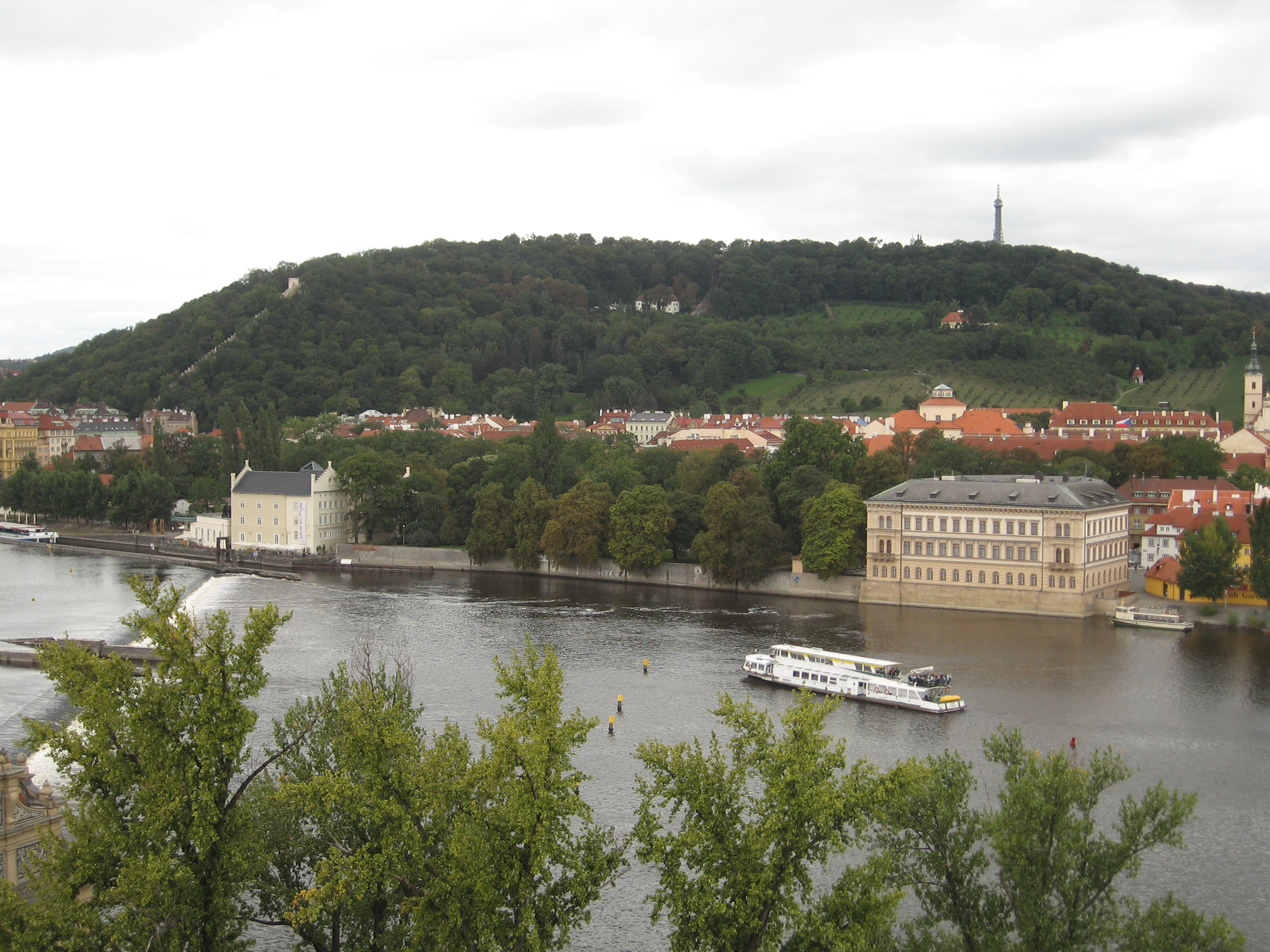
The Petřín hill (in German Laurenziberg) in Prague is featured prominently in "Description of a Struggle".

"Description of a Struggle" (German: "Beschreibung eines Kampfes") is a short story by Franz Kafka. It contains the dialogues "Conversation with the Supplicant" ("Gespräch mit dem Beter") and "Conversation with the Drunk" ("Gespräch mit dem Betrunkenen").

== Origins ==
"Description of a Struggle" is one of Kafka's earliest stories that was not destroyed and is usually the earliest included in collections of his work. (His oldest surviving work of fiction is "Shamefaced Lanky and Impure in Heart", which he wrote a few years earlier and which only survived because it was included in a letter to his friend Oskar Pollak.) Kafka began the story in 1904 at the age of 20 and worked on it on and off until 1909.

It is also notable for being the story that Kafka first showed to his friend Max Brod and which convinced Brod that Kafka should further pursue his writing. Brod liked the story so much that he mentioned Kafka as an example of "the high level reached by [today's] German literature" in a theatre review of his, this before Kafka had even been published. Brod eventually convinced Kafka to submit his work to Franz Blei's literary journal Hyperion, which published a short fragment of the story in its inaugural 1908 issue. Two further chapters were published in the short-lived Hyperion's final issue in the spring of 1909.

== Plot summary ==
"Description of a Struggle" is one of Kafka's longer minor works and is divided into three chapters. The first chapter is narrated by a young man attending a party and tells of his "acquaintance" (as he is referred to in the story) that he meets there. The second chapter is the longest and is itself split into several sections. The narrator leaps onto his acquaintance's back and rides him like a horse and imagines a landscape that responds to his every whim. He then meets an extraordinarily fat man carried on a litter who tells him the story of a "supplicant" who prays by smashing his head into the ground. In the third chapter, the narrator returns to reality, so to speak, and continues his walk up the Laurenziberg in winter with his acquaintance.

== Criticism ==
"Description of a Struggle" is not usually considered one of Kafka's better works and it is often dismissed by critics turned off by its fragmentary nature and lack of polish. John Updike, in his foreword to an English-language collection of Kafka's stories, calls it (along with "Wedding Preparations in the Country", another early story) "repellent", containing "something of adolescent posturing" and advises new readers of Kafka to skip them. Updike encourages readers to return to these early stories once "initiated" with his other works.

== Versions ==
The original version of "Description of a Struggle" ran to 110 pages long; in 1909 Kafka attempted to completely rewrite it. This rewrite, which is only 58 pages, is the version that is known today. It is not clear if the rest was lost or if he simply never finished it. In 1910 Kafka gave the manuscript to Brod, writing "what pleases me most about the novella, dear Max, is that it's out of the house." More fragments appeared in Kafka's first book, 1913's Meditations, and the modern version of the story was assembled by Brod in 1935 after Kafka's death. The story was included in the posthumous collection of the same name.

== Adaptations and derivative works ==
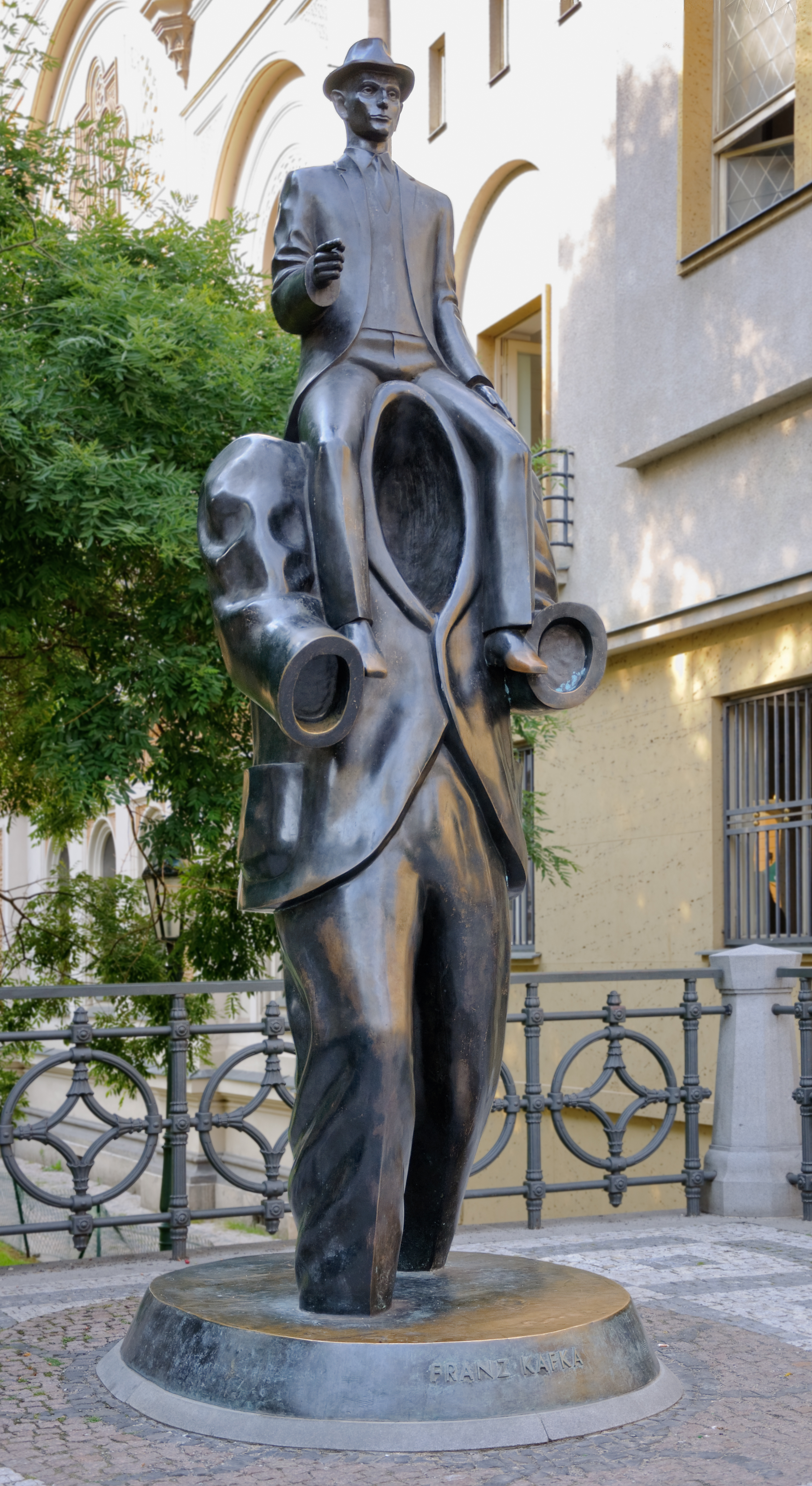
A monument in Prague depicts Kafka riding on the back of an empty suit, by Jaroslav Róna, inspired by events in the story

- A short film loosely based on the work was made in 1993 by Tony Pemberton starring Parker Posey and himself. Some of the scenes, like those depicting the fat man on his litter and those about the supplicant, are somewhat faithful to the original and use Kafka's (translated) dialogue almost verbatim, while others are variations on the theme that otherwise have little to do with it. Pemberton plays the part of the unnamed protagonist and Posey plays a female version of his acquaintance who is also the protagonist's ex-lover.
- Statue of Franz Kafka in Prague created by sculptor Jaroslav Róna is inspired by the events of the story; it depicts Kafka riding on the back of an empty suit.
