= Contemplation (short story collection) =

Collection of short stories by Franz Kafka

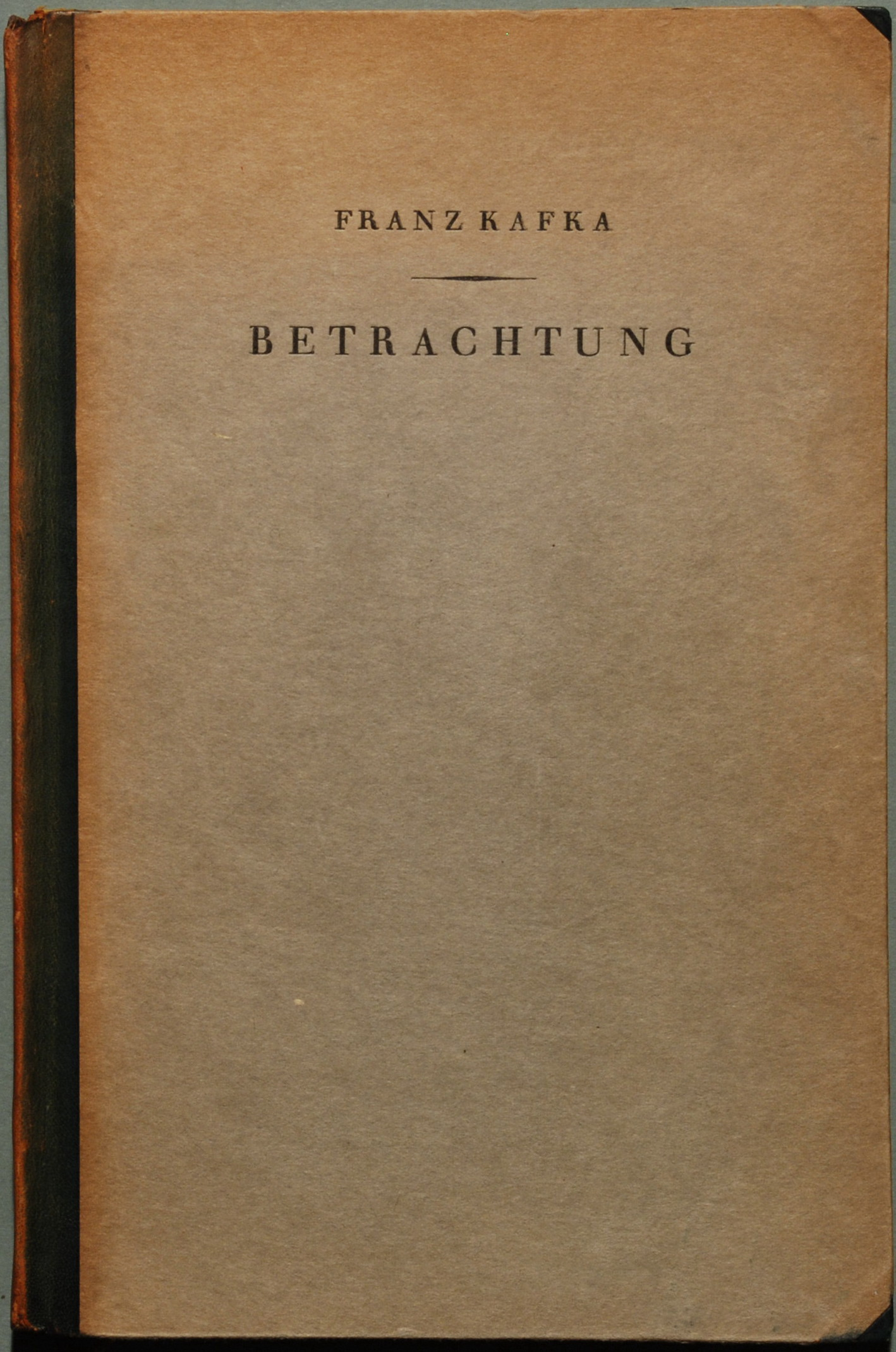
- Betrachtung, first edition, 1912
- Author: Franz Kafka
- Original title: Betrachtung
- Language: German
- Genre: Short stories
- Publisher: Rowohlt Verlag
- Publication date: 1912
- English publication date: 1958 New York, Schocken Books
- Media type: Print (hardback)
- Original text: Betrachtung at German Wikisource

Betrachtung (published in English as Meditation or Contemplation) is a collection of eighteen short stories by Franz Kafka written between 1904 and 1912. It was Kafka's first published book, printed at the end of 1912 (with the publication year given as "1913") in the Rowohlt Verlag on the initiative of Kurt Wolff.

Eight of these stories were published before under the title Betrachtungen ("Contemplations") in the bimonthly Hyperion. The collection Description of a Struggle, published in 1958, includes some of the stories In English, in whole or in part. All the stories appear in The Complete Stories of Franz Kafka (1971) and were published in a single volume edition by Twisted Spoon Press, illustrated by Fedele Spadafora. They have also been translated by Malcolm Pasley and are available in the Penguin Books edition, The Transformation and Other Stories (1992).

The book was printed in 800 editions and had in one year (1 July 1915 – 30 June 1916) sold 258 copies; it wasn't sold out until 1924, the year Kafka died.

== The Stories ==
=== "Children on a Country Road" ===
The original German title is "Kinder auf der Landstraße". Narrated by an unnamed little child, this short story follows children's thoughts as they experience childhood nighttime escapades. The plot begins with a little child on a swing watching passing carts of laborers returning from the fields. After dinner, the children venture into the woods and play a game with other village children. The game is similar to King of the hill, where some are pushed into deep ditches by others. Later on they go to the train tracks and sing: “When you mix your voice with others you are caught like a fish on a hook.” The night ends with our narrator kissing a boy, and hearing from him rumors of the next village where the residents never sleep. This story has a tone of innocence, playfulness, and retrospection as the reader is transported into the mind of an eight- or nine-year-old. Images of big grown-ups, ever-deepening ditches, and youthful recklessness serve to further our impression of this child as an innocent adventurer. The fact that the narrator's name and gender are never specified allows the story to maintain a level of non-specificity. These themes can transcend time and place, so as to capture the thoughts of a child living at any time or any place.

This story is from an unpublished second version of "Description of a Struggle".

=== "Unmasking a Confidence Trickster" ===
The original German title is "Entlarvung eines Bauernfängers". The narrator, ostensibly a recent immigrant from the country, arrives at the doorway of a grand house, having been invited to a social engagement, accompanied by a man whose fellowship he has not solicited, and with whom the narrator is only slightly acquainted. Evidently reluctant to remain with the man any longer, the narrator prepares to enter the house, but is detained by the other, who stretches out his arm toward the house and smiles as a mood of silence overtakes them both. The narrator, snapping out of his funk, suddenly recognizes his companion for a confidence trickster who stands to take advantage of his relative naiveté, and is embarrassed that it has taken him so long to realize this fact. "Caught in the act!" says the narrator, who immediately excuses himself, and, with a sense of relief, enters the house. It is left for the reader to judge the legitimacy of his accusation.

Two early drafts appear in Kafka's diaries of 1910. In 1912 he wrote that he completed "Confidence Trickster", saying of it "more or less satisfactory."

=== "The Sudden Walk" ===
The original German title is "Der plötzliche Spaziergang". This contemplation tells the story of a renaissance. It is a reawakening of the human mind; the man in the story is jerked into an awareness of his own potency that arises simply out of his being human. He has been lulled into a kind of vegetable state by routine and convention; he needs a meaningless piece of work or entertainment just to occupy his sleeping mind. As petty excuses run through his mind (it is cold, it is evening), a “fit of restlessness” raises him to his feet. What is it inside this man that slaps him awake from his customary lethargy? His mind has changed suddenly, and he has to redress himself before he goes out and “rediscovers himself down in the street.” At first, the man is especially aware of the power of his body: “your limbs responding with particular agility to the unexpected freedom you have procured for them.” Then he is overcome by the power of a decisive act: action has the ability to change. The man’s awareness of his being has given him independence, but it has not entirely isolated him. He has broken away from his family, who are headed for “the void”, but awareness of his ability to act allows him to seek companionship; perhaps in staying among his sleepy family members, the man was isolating himself from his friends. Perhaps friendship and love are only possible for an active person.

Appeared in Kafka's diaries in 1912.

=== "Resolutions" ===
The original German title is "Entschlüsse". "Resolutions" begins with the narrator planning to put on a false exterior and pretend to be something he is not. He must hide his “miserable mood” and act as though he is happy and social. He plans how he will behave towards A, B and C even though he knows it will all be false. He soon realizes that with just one slip in this act, he will ruin his social exterior and reveal to A, B and C his true feelings. He then decides it would be better to just erase all emotions and act neither happy nor depressed, but rather like an animal observing. It rises into question whether or not putting on an act is really worth it. Do we really need to pretend to be happy or social when all we truly want to do is sulk in a chair? The narrator claims it is easier to just to “throttle down whatever ghostly life remains in you” and refrain from any sort of human actions.

From his diaries, 1911.

=== "Excursion into the Mountains" ===
The original German title is "Der Ausflug ins Gebirge". "Excursion into the Mountains" is a passage about an individual isolating himself from reality. The passage is written in the first person, allowing the reader to fully connect to the thoughts and emotions of the speaker. Kafka's works often depict a passive individual who wants to stray away from the realities of life; this passage is no different, “I cried without being heard, I do not know, if nobody comes, then nobody comes…a pack of nobodies would be rather fine”. The narrator illustrates self-imposed isolation through images of mountains, a group of “nobodies” linked together going through the mountains, and the vivid image of the “nobodies” happily scavenging through the mountains. This is ironic because the reader can depict these images in any way they want, but based on the descriptions by Kafka it seems to be that the speaker is alone and him going into the mountains with this group of “nobodies” is him isolating himself from society.

From "Description of a Struggle".

=== "Bachelor's Ill Luck" ===
The original German title is "Das Unglück des Junggesellen". Also called “The Fate of a Bachelor,” this story is written in the third person. The narrator is describing the life of a bachelor and the increasing loneliness of that comes with the passing of time and no one with whom to share it. For example, the narrator imagines the bachelor lying sick in a room that is empty of any family to care for him, or having to repeatedly explain to others that he does not have any children of his own. The dominant motif in this story is loneliness.

=== "The Businessman" ===
The original German title is "Der Kaufmann" (The merchant). This short story is narrated through the perspective of a businessman. It is spoken in first person. In a world where he is experiencing a never-ending feeling of dissatisfaction, the businessman lives a mentally desolate life. He begins with describing the mental and physical stress that his work causes him such as aches, worry, anxiety, and fear. Although he is surrounded by other individuals and finds himself worrying about their problems, they are “strangers; their circumstances remain a mystery to me [him]” (p. 21). He imagines that these secretive individuals are having a far grander time than he is; “They have grown extravagant and are giving a banquet in some restaurant garden, and others are stopping off at this party” (p. 21). When he gets off work, he is liberated from the stressful demands of his business. He goes further to describe his excitement and anticipation for this time that he has to do whatever he wishes. He turns this anticipation, however, to no purpose and he simply decides to walk home and suddenly the tone of the passage swings to slightly depressing and lonesome. His imagination wanders and he paints a vivid picture in the reader’s mind of an out of body experience that occurs when he gets to the elevator in his apartment building. He describes a man being robbed and then walking “sorrowfully” down a street alone; one can make an analogy that the businessman is being robbed of his soul and is being taken advantage of by his ceaseless work. The businessman feels he is in battle with his own personal needs of happiness and the “incessant demands of my [his] business” (p. 21). At the end of the story, although it is obvious that he has gained wealth from his business, he is lonely and unsatisfied.

=== "Absent-minded Window-gazing" ===
The original German title is "Zerstreutes Hinausschaun". The story is also known as "A Stray Glance From The Window". Early in the story, the sky was blue, then the speaker observes a little girl, strolling along with the light on her face, when she suddenly falls into the shadow of a man, briskly approaching her. Then the man passes her and "by then the face of the child is quite bright."

=== "The Way Home" ===
The original German title is "Der Nachhauseweg". This story is told in first person by an unknown narrator as he walks home along a street after a thunderstorm. The power of the newly calmed air brings him to reflect upon his power over everything that happens along the street. This reflection leads him to weigh his past against his future, and he concludes that there is nothing to criticize in his life except for his unjust amount of good fortune.

Although the narrator can find no imperfections in his life, the tone is not boastful. Instead, the narrator is simply contemplating the importance of his life and his accomplishments. The tone even becomes slightly melancholic as the narrator fails to find a meaning in his life, despite all his good fortune. It is not until he reenters his house, that the narrator enters into a state of true internal mediation and evaluation. He tries to find some aspect of his life to reflect upon, but finds nothing of importance. He throws open the window, unlocking a gate to reveal the outside world, while music pours in. This breach in the shelter of his house allows real life to intrude upon his realm of contemplation, banishing any opportunity for a true reflection.

=== "Passers-by" ===
The original German title is "Die Vorüberlaufenden". Also known as "The Men Passing By", the narrator contemplates the vision of a man running past him down the street during the night. This man is followed by another man, and the narrator lets them run by. The narrator imagines several scenarios between these two men running past him. These scenarios include the two playing a game, the first running away from the second, or the two teaming up to catch an unknown third person. Depending on the scenario, the narrator feels that he would have different responsibilities. After these images pass through his mind he begins thinking that the two could have nothing to do with each other, they could be sleepwalking or returning home to their families. He then meditates on the image of the first man being the one in trouble, him being armed. The imagery in this short story is very important because, as the narrator changes his idea of the relationship between the two men, the image of the two men shifts drastically. The tone changes drastically with the narrator's change of scenario because he sets or takes away blame from one of the men, or the other. The theme of “The Men Passing By” is that of guilt and perception. The narrator's level of guilt changes with each shift of scenario and perception because, depending on the scenario, he feels that he needs to decide whether or not to intervene.

Adaptations in Austrian Sign Language were done by the deaf actor Werner Mössler .

=== "On the Tram" ===
The original German title is "Der Fahrgast" (The passenger). "On the Tram" is a short story told in first-person perspective. It describes a man standing on a tram platform, contemplating the uncertainties of his place in the world. At one point, a woman approaches the tram and the narrator is struck by her vibrance. The story focuses on images of the uncertainty of existence and one's purpose in the world, and the tone is contemplative and existential. The man on the tram cannot even defend the fact that he is on the tram, holding onto the strap, and watching people move about in the streets. When he sees the woman, however, his perspective changes. The narrator sees the girl “as distinctly as if [he] had run [his] hands over her.” He goes on to describe the woman's physical attributes with incredible detail, from her clothing to her hair. He ends his contemplation by wondering “How is it that she is not astonished at herself, that she keeps her lips closed and says nothing of that kind?” Although the narrator does not understand his own place in the world, he understands the woman's with strange clarity.

An adaptation in Austrian Sign Language was done by the deaf actor Horst Dittrich .

=== "Clothes" ===
The original German title is "Kleider" (Dresses). "Clothes" is constructed of three paragraphs with three significant points to sum up the entirety of the short story. It is told from the first person perspective of a very observant person, hypothesized to be a man observing women. Paragraph one essentially states that beautiful things exist but do not last forever. It questions women who wear beautiful things that will eventually lose value, asking, why should one indulge in something that will result in worthlessness? The second paragraph comments on how beauty should not be confined or committed to just one person, place or thing. And lastly, the third paragraph is somewhat connected to the second; familiarity is to worthlessness. Clothes are what capture the eye but if personality cannot carry its own weight, flaws will show and the worthlessness of the clothes will reflect on the worthlessness of the woman. Kafka uses symbolism such as the looking-glass to represent the mirror and the clothing, dresses, as a representation of the women.

From Description of a Struggle.

=== "The Rejection" ===
The original German title is "Die Abweisung". Told from the perspective of a man who is discussing what happens when he meets a pretty girl, "The Rejection" is structured as an imagined dialogue between this man and a hypothetical 'pretty girl'. The narrator says that she will go by without saying a word, but imagines that what she means is that she does not want anything to do with him. This is also imbued with a series of images relating to lovemaking, with mention of a limousine which 'carries you in long thrusts swaying through the street' and an 'escort of gentlemen, pressed into their suitings, following behind you in a strict semicircle and murmuring their blessings on your head.' The images also present of sexual desire, ranging from commenting on the girl's breasts to her thighs and hips. The taffeta dress she is wearing represents delight, though the story's tone is told with a sense of longing and a sense of frustration evident in the narrator's attempt at chasing women, with themes focusing on love, sexuality, and rejection.

The story's conclusion also brings about the existential realization of both the narrator and the pretty girl that they are not as important as they think they are. Since both lack what the other party deems as qualities of a good mate, they "go [their] separate ways home" as to keep them "from being irrefutably aware of [their mediocrity]".

=== "Reflections for Gentlemen-Jockeys" ===
The original German title is "Zum Nachdenken für Herrenreiter". The story is also known as "For the Consideration of Amateur Jockeys". Told from the perspective of a jockey, the narrator tells the reader about the dangers and consequences of being a jockey. The narrator uses images of envious opponents, successful and unsuccessful gambling friends, and women looking down upon the pride of the winners. The tone used in the story is that of a wiser, seasoned veteran warning amateurs and rookies of the consequences of their sport. The story focuses in depth on the unfortunate events that take place after a victory. The narrator goes on to tell of the envy of the losers and how their influences in the community will create distress for the victor. The narrator also goes on to describe the fortunes and misfortunes of friends, of those who gambled for one's victory and those who did not fearing the anger of their friend had he lost both his race and their bet. He also goes on to describe the women in the crowd, who disapprove of the victor, finding it ridiculous that the victor is so proud of his victory and of the handshaking and baby kissing that comes with it. The narrator ends his description with the unfortunate announcement of overcasting skies, foretelling rain. The story centers around the theme of the consequences and misfortunes that follow a victory, describing how winning does not always bring fortune.

=== "The Street Window" ===
The original German title is "Das Gassenfenster". The story is also known as "The Window on to the Street". The story is a two sentence long passage written by Kafka. The Narrator of this passage omnisciently takes perspective of life through a window overlooking our character's street. The character is a man who lives a life of solitude, but occasionally wants to have human interaction, and by looking out the window and seeing the people on the street, he fulfills his desire to have human interaction. In the second sentence of the passage, the Narrator discusses the times when the man does not want to look out the window, but the desire (“the horses”) then overwhelms him and in looking out the window, he attains the happiness he desired. The imagery of “horses ... drag[ing] ... him into the train or their wagons ... towards the harmony of man” show the break of our solitude character's life being ripped through the window he will never cross.

=== "The Wish to Be An Indian" ===
The original German title is "Wunsch, Indianer zu werden". The story is also known as "Longing to be a Red Indian". The work is notable for the early use of experimental writing techniques, though often considered incomprehensible by literary scholars.

=== "The Trees" ===
The original German title is "Die Bäume". Humanity is compared to tree trunks in the snow. It appears that with a gentle push we could move them, but we cannot because they are firmly attached to the ground. That too is only apparent. The tree trunks apparently cannot be moved because they are firmly rooted to the ground, much like humans are rooted to their beliefs and morals and cannot be changed. However, even if trees don't move they are not so firmly rooted, since they eventually fall down —just as humans eventually die.

A comics adaptation of the story, illustrated by Peter Kuper, is included in Give It Up!.

=== "Unhappiness" ===
The original German title is "Unglücklichsein". The story begins with a confused, chaotic scene inside the narrator's house. Kafka again uses the image of horses waiting outside of a house, as in his short story The Street Window. Suddenly, from a dark corridor within the narrator's own house, an apparition of a child appears. The narrator is not certain whether the child is real, or a ghost. The narrator engages in a dialog with the child. He learns the child already knows him. When the man is overly-formal in his interaction with the child, the child asks "I'm just a child; why stand on so much ceremony with me?" Ultimately, the conversation is aggravating and intense for the narrator. The child is gone, without having said goodbye, as soon as the narrator turns on a light in his house. The narrator concludes the child was indeed a ghost.

The child is part of the narrator's psyche trying to remind him of a natural and youthful childhood he once had, before he became alienated to the world, as a reference to the first story in Contemplation, Children on a Country Road. The narrator meets the girl with skepticism, indicating the narrator is not only alienated from the world, but now alienated from himself as well.

Later, the narrator engages in a subsequent dialog with a neighbor on the stairs of his apartment building. After the dialog with the child apparition and the man on the stairs, the narrator's conclusion is that he feels "forlorn" and just wants to go to bed.

Early drafts appeared [unpublished] in Kafka's diaries in 1910 and 1911.
