= A Hunger Artist (short story collection) =

1924 short story collection by Franz Kafka

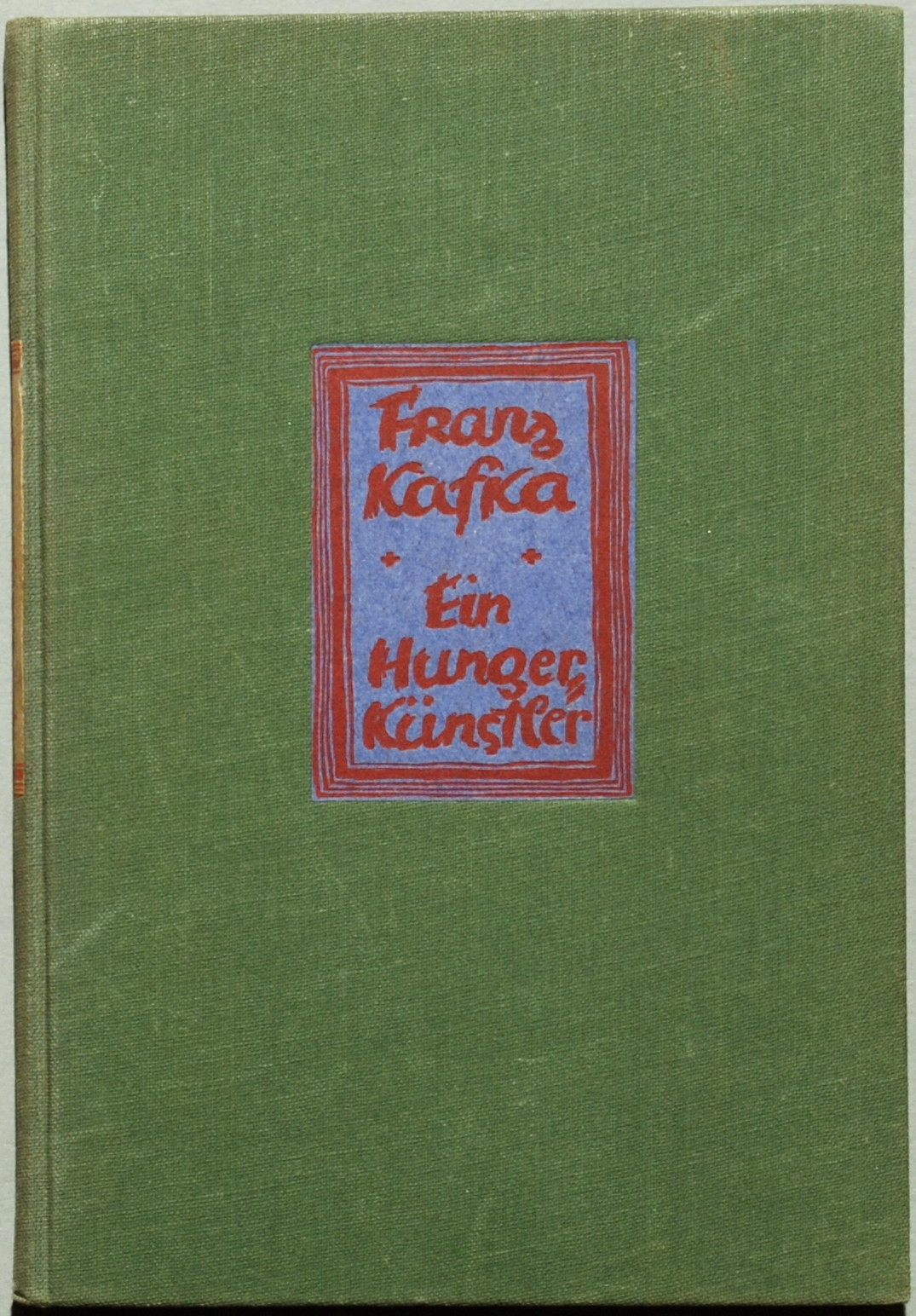
- 1st German ed. cover
- Author: Franz Kafka
- Original title: Ein Hungerkünstler
- Translator: Willa and Edwin Muir
- Language: German
- Genre: Short stories
- Publisher: Verlag Die Schmiede
- Publication date: 1924
- Publication place: Germany
- English publication date: 1948
- Media type: Print (hardback)
- Original text: Ein Hungerkünstler at German Wikisource

A Hunger Artist (German: Ein Hungerkünstler) is the collection of four short stories by Franz Kafka published in Germany in 1924, the last collection that Kafka himself prepared for publication. Kafka was able to correct the proofs during his final illness but the book was published by Verlag Die Schmiede several months after his death.

The English translation by Willa and Edwin Muir was published by Schocken Books in 1948 in the collection The Penal Colony. Schocken Books also included the Muirs' translation of the four stories in Franz Kafka: The Complete Stories (1971), edited by Nahum N. Glatzer. In 1996, the four were published as a collection in a new translation by Kevin Blahut. All individual stories in the collection have also been translated by various translators.

== Contents ==
- "Erstes Leid" ("First Sorrow")
- "Eine kleine Frau" ("A Little Woman")
- "Ein Hungerkünstler" ("A Hunger Artist")
- "Josefine, die Sängerin oder Das Volk der Mäuse" (Josephine the Singer, or the Mouse Folk")
