= My Neighbor =

- Short story by Franz Kafka
- Original title: Der Nachbar
- Language: German
- Genre(s): Short story

Publication
- Published in: Beim Bau der Chinesischen Mauer
- Media type: book (hardcover)
- Publication date: 1931
- Published in English: 1933 London, Martin Secker; 1946 New York, Schocken Books

"My Neighbor" ("Der Nachbar", literally "The Neighbor") is a short story by Franz Kafka. It was written in 1917 and published in 1931 in Berlin by Max Brod and Hans-Joachim Schoeps. The first English translation by Willa and Edwin Muir was published by Martin Secker in London in 1933. It appeared in The Great Wall of China. Stories and Reflections (New York City: Schocken Books, 1946).

The main character of the story is a young merchant who initially pretends to be self-assured but finds himself threatened by his new neighbor and possible competitor, Harras.

== Analysis ==
The narrator wants to find out more details about the life and the activities of his new neighbor Harras. He assumes that Harras wants to harm him commercially, possible even ruin him. He does not speak to Harras but makes inquiries, finding no more than that he is a "young and emerging man" like himself. He is suspicious because Harras is always in a hurry and does not seem interested in a conversation. The narrator feels increasingly threatened, his fears grow to the grotesque, without evidence. In the end, his self-confidence has dissolved completely.

== References to other works of Kafka ==
The central vehicle of the uncertainty of the protagonist is the telephone. This was a new form of communication in the beginning of the 20th century that scared Kafka. In the novel The Castle, the phone also plays an irritating confusing role.

Kafka featured the hardships of a merchant again and again, probably due to the numerous complaints of his father. An early story was titled "Der Kaufmann" ("The Merchant"). The story "Das Ehepaar" ("The Married Couple") discusses the competition between two traders. Gregor Samsa in The Metamorphosis is - an unfortunate commercial agent before he is transformed.

== Reception ==
Sudau writes "Doch der Konkurrenzkampf ist nur das offensichtliche Problem des Textes; eine tiefer sitzende Daseinsunsicherheit und -angst kann als das eigentliche angesehen werden. Zögerlichkeit, Kleinlichkeit, Misstrauen, Ängstlichkeit, Selbstvorwürfe und Zwangsvorstellungen sind sein Daseinsdiktum. ... Der Text zeigt die Genese von Vorurteil und Verfolgungswahn." (But the competition is only the obvious problem of the text, the real problem is a deeper uncertainty and anxiety. Hesitancy, pettiness, distrust, anxiety, self-blame and obsessions shape his existence. ... The text shows the genesis of prejudice and paranoia.)

== Literature ==
- Ralf Sudau: Franz Kafka: Kurze Prosa/ Erzählungen. Klett Verlag, 2007, ISBN 978-3-12-922637-7.
- Peter-André Alt: Franz Kafka: Der ewige Sohn. Eine Biographie. Verlag C.H. Beck, München 2005, ISBN 3-406-53441-4.
- Franz Kafka, Johannes Diekhans, Elisabeth Becker: Textausgaben: Die Verwandlung / Brief an den Vater und andere Werke. Schöningh im Westermann, (January 1999), ISBN 978-3-14-022290-7.
