= The Top =

The Top may refer to

- The Top (album), a 1984 album by The Cure
- "The Top" (short story), a short story by Franz Kafka

== See also ==
- Top (disambiguation)
