= Kafka Americana =

1999 collection of short stories

- First edition cover
- Author: Jonathan Lethem; Carter Scholz
- Cover artist: Jacket design by Zwetana Penova; Cover illustration by Perry Hoberman
- Language: English
- Genre: Short stories, pastiche, parody
- Publisher: Subterranean Press
- Publication date: November 1999
- Publication place: United States
- Media type: Print (hardback & paperback)
- Pages: 100 pp (first edition, hardcover)
- ISBN: 1-892284-43-X (first edition, hardcover)
- OCLC: 43333743

Kafka Americana is a 1999 collection of short stories by Jonathan Lethem and Carter Scholz based on the life (and alternate histories) and works of Franz Kafka. Originally published in a limited edition by Subterranean Press, it was released as a trade paperback by W. W. Norton & Company in 2001.

== The stories ==
- "Blumfeld, an Elderly Bachelor" (Scholz)

A re-imagining of Kafka's uncompleted short story. First published in Crank! 1.

- "The Notebooks of Bob K." (Lethem)

Batman is presented as Kafka's creation, with parodies of some of Kafka's famous aphorisms and stories, including "The Burrow", "A Crossbreed (A Sport)", and "The Vulture". A significantly different version of the story appeared in Gas 6.

- "Receding Horizon" (Lethem & Scholz)

Kafka comes to America, changes his name to Jack Dawson, and writes screenplays in Hollywood. First published in Crank! 5.

- "The Amount to Carry" (Scholz)

Kafka meets fellow insurance executives Wallace Stevens and Charles Ives. First published in Starlight 2.

- "K. is for Fake" (Lethem)

Parody of The Trial. First published in McSweeney's Quarterly 4.
