= The Bucket Rider =

- Short story by Franz Kafka
- Original title: Der Kübelreiter
- Language: German
- Genre: Short story

Publication
- Published in: Beim Bau der Chinesischen Mauer
- Media type: book (hardcover)
- Publication date: 1931
- Published in English: 1933 London, Martin Secker; 1946 New York, Schocken Books

"The Bucket Rider" (German: "Der Kübelreiter") is a short story by Franz Kafka, written in 1917. It first appeared in the Prager Presse in 1921 and was published posthumously in Beim Bau der Chinesischen Mauer (Berlin, 1931). The first English translation, by Willa and Edwin Muir, was published by Martin Secker in London in 1933. It also appeared in The Great Wall of China. Stories and Reflections (New York City: Schocken Books, 1946).

The story is about a man looking for coal to fill his flying bucket. He is a poor man and hopes that the coal-dealer will be generous enough to lend him some coal. He claims that he will pay for the coal later. When he arrives riding his flying bucket above the coal-dealer's house, he pleads for the coal, but it soon becomes apparent that the coal-dealer and his wife are oblivious to his needs. The wife in particular ignores him, discouraging her husband from giving any coal away for free, and the narrator scorns her. He leaves them in anger, "ascending to the ice mountains ... lost forever."

The story, the bulk of which is dialogue, has been interpreted as a discourse on the inevitable conflict between people due to the innate differences between them. Another interpretation is that the conflict between the bucket-rider and the coal-dealer is due to language being both a barrier and a bridge among people.
