= The Problem of Our Laws =

- Short story by Franz Kafka
- Original title: Zur Frage der Gesetze
- Language: German
- Genre: Short story

Publication
- Published in: Beim Bau der Chinesischen Mauer
- Media type: book (hardcover)
- Publication date: 1931
- Published in English: 1933 London, Martin Secker; 1946 New York, Schocken Books

"The Problem of Our Laws" (German: "Zur Frage der Gesetze") is a short parable by Franz Kafka that discusses an elitist authoritarian regime of arcane governance.

== Publication History ==
- 1931 - Published posthumously in Beim Bau der Chinesischen Mauer (Berlin, 1931).
- 1933 - The first English translation by Willa and Edwin Muir was published by Martin Secker in London in 1933.
- 1946 - Appeared in The Great Wall of China. Stories and Reflections (New York City: Schocken Books, 1946).
- 2015 - A translation by Michael Hofmann is published in the London Review of Books July 6, 2015.

== Plot ==
The story is a short narrative, where laws of the land are described as esoteric, created by the elite. Thus, being such they are out of the hands by the common people, yet binding. Nobility is seen as the authority, the creator and executor of laws, yet completely separate from those whom they apply to. Yet, these laws create a sense of security among those who follow them, an empty one, since they are in fact a type of cruel joke.

== Analysis ==
The story echoes the labyrinthine system of law and regulations in place among the official in Kafka's earlier novel, The Castle.
