= The Hunter Gracchus =

- Short story by Franz Kafka
- Original title: Der Jäger Gracchus
- Language: German
- Genre: Short story

Publication
- Published in: Beim Bau der Chinesischen Mauer
- Media type: book (hardcover)
- Publication date: 1931
- Published in English: 1933 London, Martin Secker; 1946 New York, Schocken Books

"The Hunter Gracchus" (German: "Der Jäger Gracchus") is a short story by Franz Kafka. The story presents a boat carrying the long-dead Hunter Gracchus as it arrives at a port. The mayor of Riva meets Gracchus, who gives him an account of his death while hunting, and explains that he is destined to wander aimlessly and eternally over the seas. An additional fragment presents an extended dialogue between Gracchus and an unnamed interviewer, presumably the same mayor.

Written in the first half of 1917, the story was published posthumously in Beim Bau der Chinesischen Mauer (Berlin, 1931). The first English translation, by Willa and Edwin Muir, was published by Martin Secker in London in 1933. It also appeared in The Great Wall of China. Stories and Reflections (New York: Schocken Books, 1946). The story and the fragment both appear in The Complete Stories.

Daniel Heller-Roazen said "consideration of Kafka’s accounts of Gracchus must begin with the observation that they are unpublished and unauthorized; in principle, all were to be destroyed according to the author’s wishes."

In a diary entry for April 6, 1917, Kafka describes a strange boat standing at port, which he is told belongs to the Hunter Gracchus.

The story is paraphrased in, and its content interwoven throughout W. G. Sebald's novel Vertigo as well as in Hélène Cixous's Le Détrônement de la mort. The story and the related fragment are also discussed in Joy Williams' 2021 Harrow.
