= The City Coat of Arms =

- Short story by Franz Kafka
- Original title: Das Stadtwappen
- Language: German
- Genre: Short story

Publication
- Published in: Beim Bau der Chinesischen Mauer
- Media type: book (hardcover)
- Publication date: 1931
- Published in English: 1933 London, Martin Secker; 1946 New York, Schocken Books

"The City Coat of Arms" (German: "Das Stadtwappen") is a short story by Franz Kafka, published posthumously in Beim Bau der Chinesischen Mauer (Berlin, 1931). The first English translation by Willa and Edwin Muir was published by Martin Secker in London in 1933. It appeared in The Great Wall of China. Stories and Reflections (New York City: Schocken Books, 1946).

== Plot ==
The short story details the creation of the Tower of Babel and related support and planning work. The narrator notes that the massive scale of the project creates so many logistical and societal complications that it becomes impossible for civilization to ever achieve the original plan, or to even seriously believe in the plan. Various defeatist concerns cause the people to focus on building the surrounding city rather than the tower. Different groups and nationalities then fight over their place in the city. A few generations later, the people recognize the tower is senseless, but the project continues on because everybody is too deeply involved to be able to leave. The narrator explains that the songs and legends in the city express a desire for the city to be destroyed by a giant fist, which the narrator says is the reason why the city has a fist on its coat of arms.

== Analysis ==
The story can be interpreted as Kafka's criticism of the layers of bureaucracy that follow projects, as well as his reaction to the changing city he lived in at the time. Kafka lived in Prague, which had a large tower constructed by many workers and large funds yet was condemned. While some scholars have noted the story's relevance to elements in the Torah, others have noted Kafka's use of realism, utilized by earlier writers such as Stephen Crane. Kafka noted the piece in at least one of his letters, and wrote that it was inspired by his study of the Midrash and the rising pollution he noted in Prague.
