= A Common Confusion =

- Short story by Franz Kafka
- Original title: Eine alltägliche Verwirrung
- Language: German
- Genre(s): Short story

Publication
- Published in: Beim Bau der Chinesischen Mauer
- Media type: book (hardcover)
- Publication date: 1931
- Published in English: 1933 London, Martin Secker; 1946 New York, Schocken Books

"A Common Confusion" (German: "Eine alltägliche Verwirrung") is a short story by Franz Kafka. It was published posthumously in Beim Bau der Chinesischen Mauer (Berlin, 1931). The first English translation by Willa and Edwin Muir was published by Martin Secker in London in 1933. It appeared in The Great Wall of China. Stories and Reflections (New York City: Schocken Books, 1946).

== Synopsis ==
The story details transactions between A and B. A meets B at H and comes home pleased with the events. Following this, he meets B again, but only after a delay to the very same H he arrived at successfully previously. B is not there. To add insult to injury, A learns B had arrived early waiting for him. Thankfully he has an opportunity to explain to B what happened, but in his haste he trips and falls. He hears B above him stomping down the stairs enraged.

== Analysis ==
The story has parallels with the dynamics of the officials within The Castle (novel). Like many of Kafka's characters the good intentions, hard work, and diligence are futile efforts in an indifferent world. Kafka begins the story by stating the events are a "common experience" suggesting the story is an example of a universal rule.
