= The Knock at the Manor Gate =

Short story by Franz Kafka

"The Knock at the Manor Gate" (German: "Der Schlag ans Hoftor") is a short story by Franz Kafka. It was published posthumously in Beim Bau der Chinesischen Mauer (Berlin, 1931). The first English translation by Willa and Edwin Muir was published by Martin Secker in London in 1933. It appeared in The Great Wall of China. Stories and Reflections (New York City: Schocken Books, 1946).

== Plot ==
The short story illustrates many important themes in Kafka's works. The narrator details a ride with his sister on the way towards home. His sister playfully knocks on the door of a large house. This knock proves to have grave consequences. The owner is a person of great power and sends troops after the two of them. The narrator describes the tale as one of warning, that small actions can have big consequences in life, as he is about to be tortured.
