= At Night =

At Night may refer to:

- At Night (2007 film), a Danish short film
- At Night (2026 film), a French-British drama
- "At Night" (song), a 2002 song by Shakedown
- "At Night" (short story), a short story by Franz Kafka
- "At Night", a 1980 song by Eddie and the Hot Rods
- "At Night", a 1996 song by Flying Saucer Attack
- "At Night", a 1963 song by Neil Diamond
- "At Night", a 1963 song by Paul Anka
