= A Little Fable =

Short story by Franz Kafka

- Short story by Franz Kafka
- Original title: Kleine Fabel
- Language: German
- Genre: Short story

Publication
- Published in: Beim Bau der Chinesischen Mauer
- Media type: book (hardcover)
- Publication date: 1931
- Published in English: 1933 London, Martin Secker; 1946 New York, Schocken Books

"A Little Fable" (German: "Kleine Fabel") is a short story written by Franz Kafka between 1917 and 1923, likely in 1920. The anecdote, only one paragraph in length, was not published in Kafka's lifetime and first appeared in Beim Bau der Chinesischen Mauer (1931). The first English translation by Willa and Edwin Muir was published by Martin Secker in London in 1933. It appeared in The Great Wall of China. Stories and Reflections (New York City: Schocken Books, 1946). In 1973, it was published in a collection of Kafka stories translated by Malcolm Pasley. In 2024, it was published as "Little Fable" in a collection of Kafka stories translated by Mark Harman.

== The story ==
The story, in its entirety, as translated by Willa and Edwin Muir, reads:

"Alas", said the mouse, "the whole world is growing smaller every day. At the beginning it was so big that I was afraid, I kept running and running, and I was glad when I saw walls far away to the right and left, but these long walls have narrowed so quickly that I am in the last chamber already, and there in the corner stands the trap that I am running into." "You only need to change your direction," said the cat, and ate it up.

== In popular culture ==
- A comics adaptation of the story, illustrated by Peter Kuper, is included in Give It Up!.
- A three-language version in German, English and Spanish, illustrated by Elvira Calderón, edited by Elena Moreno Sobrino Saarbrücken: Calambac Publishing House, (2013) ISBN 978-3-943117-79-0
- David Foster Wallace quotes and discusses the story in his collection of essays Consider the Lobster.
