= The Village Schoolmaster =

- Short story by Franz Kafka
- Original title: Der Riesenmaulwurf
- Language: German
- Genre: Short story

Publication
- Published in: Beim Bau der Chinesischen Mauer
- Media type: book (hardcover)
- Publication date: 1931
- Published in English: 1933 London, Martin Secker; 1946 New York, Schocken Books

"The Village Schoolmaster" or "The Giant Mole" ("Der Dorfschullehrer" or "Der Riesenmaulwurf") is an unfinished short story by Franz Kafka. The story, written in December 1914 and the beginning of 1915, was not published in Kafka's lifetime. It first appeared in Beim Bau der Chinesischen Mauer (Berlin, 1931). The first English translation by Willa and Edwin Muir was published by Martin Secker in London in 1933. It appeared in The Great Wall of China. Stories and Reflections (New York: Schocken Books, 1946). "The Village Schoolmaster" was also translated by Malcolm Pasley and published by Martin Secker & Warburg in 1973 and by Penguin Books in 1991.

== Plot summary ==
The narrator discusses the phenomenon of a giant mole not far from a small village, and the attempt of the village schoolmaster to bring its existence to the public attention by writing a little treatise about the giant mole, only to become an object of derision to the scientific community. Without knowing the schoolmaster or even reading the schoolmaster's little treatise, the narrator tries to defend him and his honesty in a paper about the giant mole. The narrator's attempts to help are also unsuccessful, only inspiring the teacher's jealousy and bitterness. The teacher visits the businessman during the Christmas holidays, and they argue, revealing the wildly different outcomes they had been hoping for all along. Without being able to finish the conversation, they reach a stalemate and the story ends abruptly.

== Analysis ==
Dr Oliver Tearle of Loughborough University writes, "'The Village Schoolmaster' is perhaps best described as a parable about the problem of interpretation.... [W]e cannot get at true 'reality' because our engagement with it is always mediated by the discourse surrounding it." Tearle also raises the possibility that "The Village Schoolmaster" is "on some level a story about religious faith."

== Process of writing ==
Kafka discusses the story in a diary entry from December 19, 1914:

Yesterday wrote "The Village Schoolmaster" almost without knowing it, but was afraid to go on writing later than a quarter to two; the fear was well founded, I slept hardly at all, merely suffered through perhaps three short dreams and was then in the office in the condition one would expect. Yesterday father's reproaches on account of the factory: 'you talked me into it.' Then went home and calmly wrote for three hours in the consciousness that my guilt is beyond question, though not so great as father pictures it.

In a January 6, 1915 entry Kafka mentions abandoning the story.
