= Give It Up! (comics) =

Give It Up! is a comic drawn by Peter Kuper that adapts nine short stories by Franz Kafka.

In the introduction, by Jules Feiffer, Kuper's adaptations are described as "riffs, visual improvisations."

== The Stories ==
- A Little Fable
- The Bridge
- Give It Up!
- A Hunger Artist
- A Fratricide
- The Helmsman
- The Trees
- The Top
- The Vulture
