= The Silence of the Sirens =

- Short story by Franz Kafka
- Original title: Das Schweigen der Sirenen
- Language: German
- Genre(s): Short story

Publication
- Published in: Beim Bau der Chinesischen Mauer
- Media type: book (hardcover)
- Publication date: 1931
- Published in English: 1933 London, Martin Secker; 1946 New York, Schocken Books

"The Silence of the Sirens" (German: "Das Schweigen der Sirenen") is a short story by Franz Kafka. It was not published until 1931, seven years after his death. Max Brod selected stories and published them in the collection Beim Bau der Chinesischen Mauer. The first English translation by Willa and Edwin Muir was published by Martin Secker in London in 1933. It appeared in The Great Wall of China. Stories and Reflections (New York City: Schocken Books, 1946).

The story briefly discusses and re-analyzes the famous journey of Ulysses in which he confronts the deadly Sirens. Canonically, Ulysses tied himself to his ship's mast so that he could experience the Sirens without being driven mad and jumping into the sea. He ordered his crew to stop their ears with wax, so that they would not be tempted by the siren song to steer the ship into the rocks on which the creatures perched. In Kafka's version, however, Ulysses puts wax in his own ears, and is then tied to the mast. Kafka's telling asserts that the Sirens' silence is an even more deadly weapon than their song, and further states that the Sirens fell silent when they saw the expression of "innocent elation" on Ulysses face. Yet because Ulysses' stratagem involved stoppering his ears to block out their singing, Ulysses didn't realize that the Sirens were silent. Finally, Kafka mentions an additional possibility that has been "handed down": that Ulysses knew the Sirens were not singing, but pretended not to notice it in order to protect himself from divine wrath over his victory. But Kafka admits that the human understanding is beyond its depths on this issue.

The story can be interpreted as a commentary on the futility of complicated approaches to daunting problems. Kafka himself (in English translation) introduces the story as, "Proof that inadequate, even childish measures, may serve to rescue one from peril."
