= Harrow (novel) =

2021 novel by Joy Williams

- First edition
- Author: Joy Williams
- Language: English
- Genre: Science fiction, Fantasy
- Publisher: Knopf
- Publication date: September 14, 2021
- Publication place: United States
- Media type: Print
- ISBN: 9780525657569

Harrow is a science-fiction fantasy novel by Joy Williams, published September 14, 2021 by Knopf Publishing Group.

== Plot ==
The novel is set in a near-future America following an unspecified environmental collapse. Nature has been largely destroyed, animals have vanished, and society has fragmented. The narrative is deliberately non-linear and fragmented, shifting between perspectives and time periods.

The story centers on Khristen, also called Lamb, whose mother believes she briefly died as an infant and returned to life, marking her as destined for something extraordinary. As a child, Khristen is sent to an elite boarding school where teachers pose unanswerable philosophical questions to their students. During her third year, the school abruptly closes as "the situation in the world" deteriorates—resources dwindle, children disappear, and the outside world seems to be collapsing.

With her mother vanished, Khristen travels across a blighted landscape until she arrives at a decaying resort on the shores of a toxic, blackened lake the residents call "Big Girl." The resort functions as the Institute, home to a community of elderly radicals led by a woman named Lola. These aging activists, described as having "kamikaze hearts," plot acts of eco-terrorism against corporations and individuals they hold responsible for environmental destruction. They plan suicide bombings targeting trophy-hunting conventions, bulldozer dealerships, and other symbols of ecological devastation, not believing their actions will change anything, but seeking some small measure of accountability.

At the Institute, Khristen meets Jeffrey, a precocious ten-year-old boy obsessed with maritime law. The two form an unlikely bond amid the eccentric, dying community. After they are separated, Jeffrey reappears much later as a judge, still seemingly ten years old despite the passage of time—one of many surreal distortions in the novel's fractured chronology.

In the final sections, Khristen and Jeffrey reunite in what may be the afterlife, engaging in a conversation about Franz Kafka's story "The Hunter Gracchus," which concerns a dead hunter whose funeral bark has gone off course, leaving him wandering between life and death. The novel ends ambiguously, with hints of something miraculous hovering over its conclusion, suggesting themes of guilt, purgatory, and the possibility of renewal even amid total devastation.

== Reception ==
Harrow received starred reviews from Kirkus Books, Booklist, and Publishers Weekly, as well as positive reviews from the Los Angeles Review of Books, Los Angeles Times, New York Review of Books, Wall Street Journal, New Yorker, Star Tribune, Atlantic, Chicago Review of Books, ZYZZYVA, and A.V. Club. The book received a mixed review from The Washington Post and The New York Times.

Accolades for Harrow
Year	Accolade	Result	Ref.
2021	Kirkus Prize	Winner	
2021	Kirkus Reviews' Best Books Of 2021	Selection	
2022	PEN/Jean Stein Book Award	Longlist	
