= Shamefaced Lanky and Impure in Heart =

- Short story by Franz Kafka
- Original title: Der Unredliche in seinem Herzen
- Translator: Richard and Clara Winston
- Language: German
- Genre(s): Short story

Publication
- Published in: Briefe 1902-1924
- Media type: Print
- Publication date: 1958 (written 1902)
- Published in English: 1977

"Shamefaced Lanky and Impure in Heart" (German: "Der Unredliche in seinem Herzen") is the title usually given to Franz Kafka's earliest surviving work of fiction, a short story that he wrote in 1902 and that has survived only because it was included in a letter to his friend Oskar Pollak.

== Background ==
It is unclear whether "Shamefaced Lanky and Impure in Heart" was written for the letter, which Kafka sent to Pollack postmarked 20 December 1902, or if he had worked on it previously. All that Kafka writes about the story is that it is "new and hard to tell." It is similarly unknown whether Kafka considered publishing the story, or even thought of it as a stand-alone piece. The story has never been included in any collection of Kafka's fiction and appears only in Letters to Friends, Family, and Editors (German: Briefe 1902-1924), where it is embedded within the letter sent to Pollack.

== Plot ==
The story describes a meeting between Impure in Heart, a dandy who lives in a big city "who got drunk night after night and was frantic night after night," and Shamefaced Lanky, a tall and awkward man who has "crept off to hide his face in an old village" and knits "woolen socks for the peasants." Impure in Heart talks to Shamefaced Lanky at length. At first, his words turn into finely dressed "little gentlemen" who make their way across the room and crawl into Lanky's ears. He goes on to tell Lanky "a merry mix" of stories while "stabbing his pointed cane into Lanky's belly" until he is content, then smiles and leaves. When Lanky is left alone he begins weeping and asks himself a series of questions about the visitor and himself, before finally returning to his knitting.

== Interpretation ==
According to Kafka's close friend Max Brod:

Shamefaced Lanky is Kafka himself, while Impure in Heart is a portrait of his former classmate at the Gymnasium (high school), Emil Utitz (1883-1956), then a student of philosophy and a follower of Franz Brentano.

However, Frederick Robert Karl claims that Impure in Heart was intended to depict the letter's addressee Oskar Pollak, an assessment also endorsed by Sander L. Gilman, who saw the story as an outgrowth of Kafka and Pollak's "passionate relationship," which "stressed the rhetoric of the body in a homoerotic setting." Mark M. Anderson claims that this "tense, erotically charged encounter" anticipates a similar struggle between two modes of life in Kafka's "Description of a Struggle" and is notable for "the centrality of the city/country distinction and the allegorical use of clothing," motifs that reappear throughout his writing.
