= The Married Couple =

- Short story by Franz Kafka
- Original title: Das Ehepaar
- Language: German
- Genre(s): Short story

Publication
- Published in: Beim Bau der Chinesischen Mauer
- Media type: book (hardcover)
- Publication date: 1931
- Published in English: 1933 London, Martin Secker; 1946 New York, Schocken Books

"The Married Couple" (German: "Das Ehepaar") is a 1922 short story by Franz Kafka. It was published posthumously in Beim Bau der Chinesischen Mauer (Berlin, 1931). The first English translation by Willa and Edwin Muir was published by Martin Secker in London in 1933. It appeared in The Great Wall of China. Stories and Reflections (New York City: Schocken Books, 1946).

== Plot ==
The story is about a businessman who is desolate. He becomes bored in his day-to-day affairs at the office and decides to contact some of his customers personally. One of them, N., is an old man with whom he has had previous personal and business contact. He meets N at his house, and notices how frail he's become. N is old and sick, but still mentally as sharp as ever, and is not as receptive to the business proposal as the narrator had hoped. Moreover, while N's wife is aged, she is alert, vivacious, and protective of her husband. At one point it seems the old man has died, but he is actually asleep. The alarm expressed by the narrator only amplifies his own weaknesses, and he is patronized by the wife as he leaves alone.

== Analysis ==
Although Kafka is sometimes noted by scholars as portraying women as seductive, destructive forces, this story characterizes the wife as a loyal and protective force. Moreover, the woman is completely absorbed in the marriage, both an advantage and a hindrance to the husband's life.
