= Franz Blei =

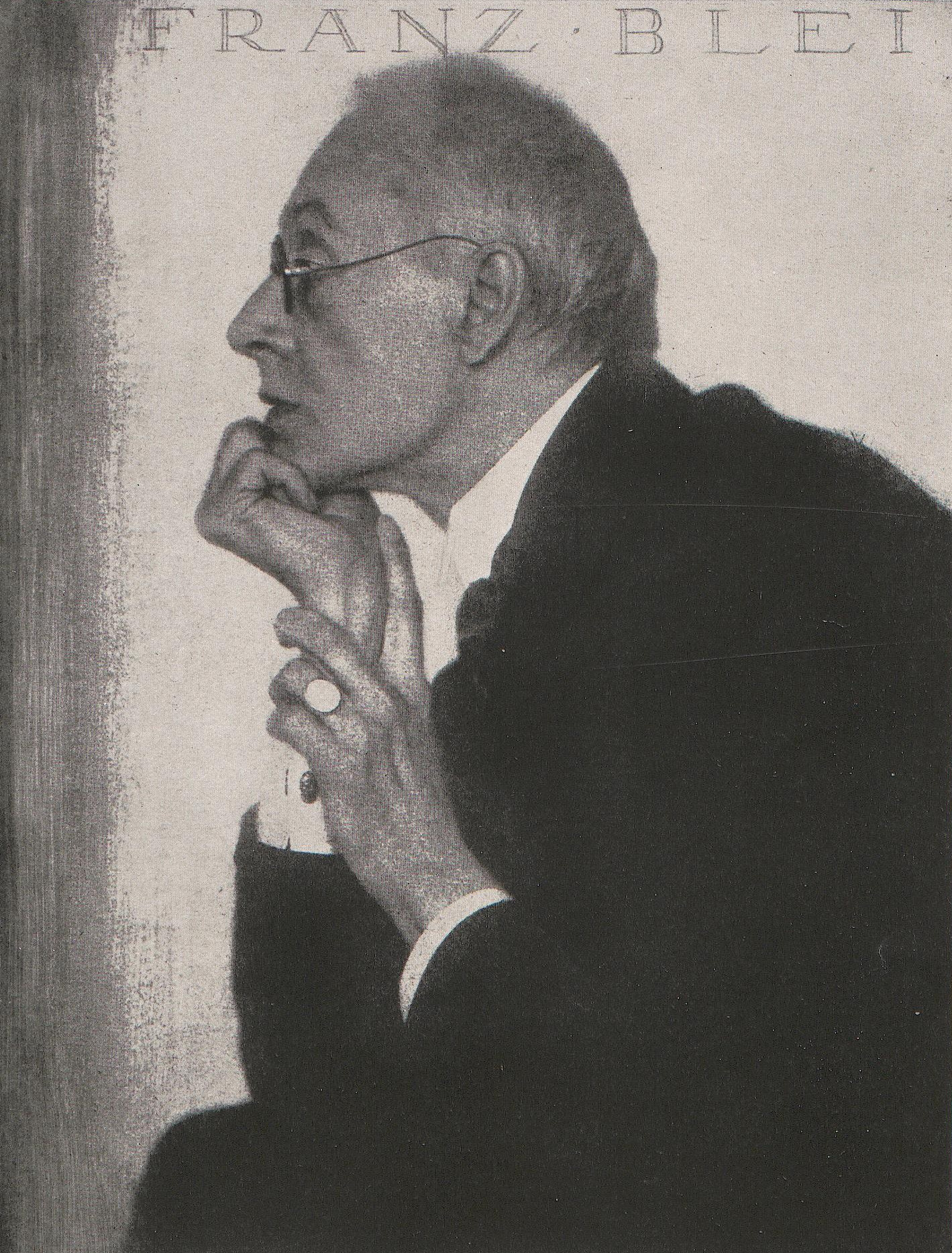
- Blei in 1918
- Born: January 18, 1871; Vienna, Austria
- Died: July 10, 1942 (aged 71); Westbury, New York, US
- Education: Westbury
- Occupations: Essayist; Playwright; Translator

Franz Blei (pseudonyms: Medardus, Dr. Peregrinus Steinhövel, Amadée de la Houlette, Franciscus Amadeus, Gussie Mc-Bill, Prokop Templin, Heliogabal, Nikodemus Schuster, L. O. G., Hans Adolar; January 18, 1871 – July 10, 1942) was an essayist, playwright and translator. He was also noted as a bibliophile, a critic, an editor in chief and publisher. He was a friend and collaborator of Franz Kafka.

== Life ==
He was the son of a shoemaker and trained as an architect. As a member of the literati, he was at great risk in Nazi-occupied Europe and eventually succeeded after a lengthy odyssey in reaching the USA in 1941 where he settled in New York City.

== Work ==
He translated into German work by Walt Whitman, Oscar Wilde and Molière among others and also published his own monograph on the paintings of the symbolist Félicien Rops. He was also a prolific editor of small-press journals.

Kafka said of him: "Franz Blei is much cleverer, and greater, than what he writes." (Janouch, 1971. "Conversations With Kafka").

== Amethyst and The Opals ==
From December 1905 to November 1906, he was the editor of the private magazine Amethyst (pub. Hans von Weber) and then The Opals, which were available by subscription only and were mildly pornographic. The journals featured the artwork of Aubrey Beardsley and Félicien Rops, texts by Jules Laforgue and also erotic prose from translated texts by Paul Verlaine and classic erotic plays and poems from around the world. Only 800 numbered copies were produced of each issue, and the young Kafka had a subscription. The Opals was the first to publish Carl Einstein's Bebuquin, the first German expressionist novel. These literary small-press journals, known about by Kafka scholars for many decades, became the basis for a silly season press story in 2008, in The Times of London, when a novelist promoting a new book claimed to have discovered Kafka's 'secret pornography stash' among his archived papers.

== Hyperion ==
From 1908 to 1909, he co-edited the short-lived journal Hyperion with Carl Sternheim, which was the first to publish work by a young Franz Kafka. The first issue published a short fragment of Kafka's story "Description of a Struggle". More substantial extracts of the work were published in the final issue of Hyperion in the spring of 1909. Extracts from another seven Kafka works were also published in the magazine.

== Bibliography ==
- Paul Raabe, "Franz Kafka und Franz Blei", in: F. Kafka. Ein Symposium. Datierung, Funde, Materialien, Verlag Klaus Wagenbach, Berlin 1965, pp. 7–20.
- Ulrich E Bach, "Franz Bleis einsames Exil." In: Deutschsprachige Exilliteratur seit 1933 3/I USA Supplement. Ed. John M. Spalek, Konrad Feilchenfeldt and Sandra H. Hawrylchak. Berlin: De Gruyter, 2010: 3-13.
- Ulrich E Bach, "'Das Formierte der Erotik': Franz Blei und der erotische Buchhandel." In: Christine Hauck, Johannes Frimmel and Anke Vogel (eds.), Erotisch-pornographische Lesestoffe: Das Geschäft mit Erotik im deutschen Sprachraum vom 18. Jahrhundert bis zur Gegenwart. Wiesbaden: Harrassowitz 2015. 143-158.
