= First Sorrow =

Short story by Franz Kafka, c.1921

- Short story by Franz Kafka
- Original title: 'Erstes Leid'
- Translator: Lilian F. Turner (1937); Willa and Edwin Muir (1948)
- Country: Germany
- Language: German
- Genre(s): Short story

Publication
- Published in: Genius
- Publication type: periodical
- Publication date: 1922
- Published in English: 1937

"First Sorrow" (German: "Erstes Leid") is a short story by Franz Kafka. It was probably written between the fall of 1921 and the spring of 1922. It appeared in Kurt Wolff Verlag's art periodical Genius, III no. 2 (dated 1921, published in 1922) and in the Christmas 1923 supplement to the Prager Presse. The story was included in the collection A Hunger Artist (Ein Hungerkünstler) published by Verlag Die Schmiede soon after Kafka's death.

== Plot outline ==
The story concerns a trapeze artist who wants to remain on his trapeze at all times, and never return to the ground. He is faced with difficulties when the circus he works for must travel from place to place. The artist is said to be dedicated to perfecting his art. Nobody objects to this and they accommodate his every demand. When the artist does travel, he gets his own accommodation: for in-town shows, he is taken to performances in a race car to shorten his sufferings, or, if travelling by train, a compartment is reserved and he travels atop the luggage. Upon arrival, the artist takes his place, hanging aloft on the trapeze. Even during performances of the theatrical group, he remains in public view, perfectly still.

One day, as the group travels to another destination, the trapeze artist captures his manager's attention with a barely audible voice to ask a question. The manager is all attention and the artist tells the manager that in the future he would prefer to have a second trapeze. The manager agrees with this, but is not one that would have been otherwise refused. At this moment, the artist bursts into tears and says "Only the one bar in my hand--how can I go on living!" (448). The manager assures him that he will get his second trapeze and the artist returns to sleep atop the luggage. But the manager now worries about the future of the artist as he has, for the first time, begun to question the nature of the art that is his profession: "Once such ideas began to torment him, would they ever quite leave him alone? Would they not threaten his very existence? And indeed the manager believed he could see, during the apparently peaceful sleep which had succeeded the fit furrows of care engraving themselves upon the trapeze artist's smooth, childlike forehead".

== English publication history ==
- 1937; as "First Grief", translated by Lilian F. Turner, "Life and Letters", Summer 1937, pp. 57–59.
- 1948; translated by Willa and Edwin Muir, in The Penal Colony, New York, Schocken Books, 320 p.
