= A Crossbreed =

- Short story by Franz Kafka
- Original title: Eine Kreuzung
- Language: German
- Genre: Short story

Publication
- Published in: Beim Bau der Chinesischen Mauer
- Media type: Book (hardcover)
- Publication date: 1931
- Published in English: 1933 London, Martin Secker; 1946 New York, Schocken Books

"A Crossbreed" (German: "Eine Kreuzung") is a short story by Franz Kafka.

The story is about an animal that is half-kitten, half-lamb. The narrator describes how the creature has characteristics of each breed of animal, yet also has distinctive attributes of its own. In much of the story, great care is taken to describe the animal's peculiar eating habits (e.g. drinking milk while showing fangs). Some analysis has been made to make parallels between this story and Tolstoy's emphasis on food and human behavior.

Like most of his works, Kafka wrote the story with no intent of its being published, though it was published posthumously by Max Brod in Beim Bau der Chinesischen Mauer (Berlin, 1931). The first English translation by Willa and Edwin Muir was published by Martin Secker in London in 1933. It appeared in The Great Wall of China. Stories and Reflections in 1946.
