= Jaroslav Róna =

Czech painter, sculptor, and university educator (born 1957)

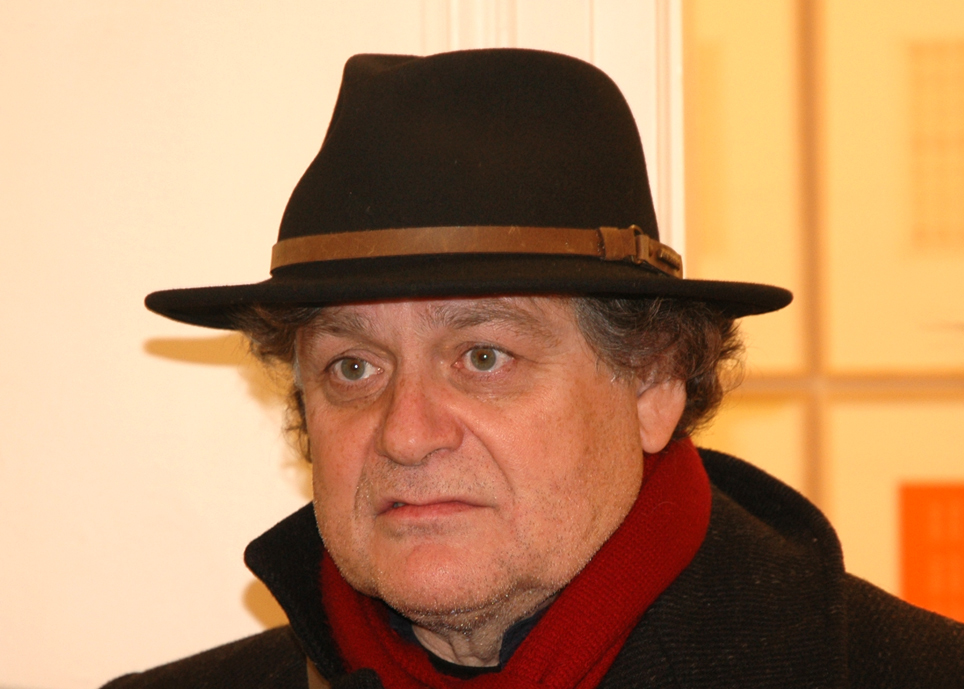
Jaroslav Róna in 2012

Jaroslav Róna (born 27 April 1957 in Prague-Letná) is a Czech-Jewish sculptor, painter, actor, educator, and writer.

== Works ==
- Franz Kafka – bronze statue on Dušní Street (Holy Spirit Street), historic Jewish Quarter, Prague; inspired by the events in the Description of a Struggle
- The Angel Award statuette (an angel playing horn)
- The Komerční banka Award statuette
- Book, Umanuté kresby, Praha: Torst, 2002, ISBN 80-7215-173-8

== Gallery ==
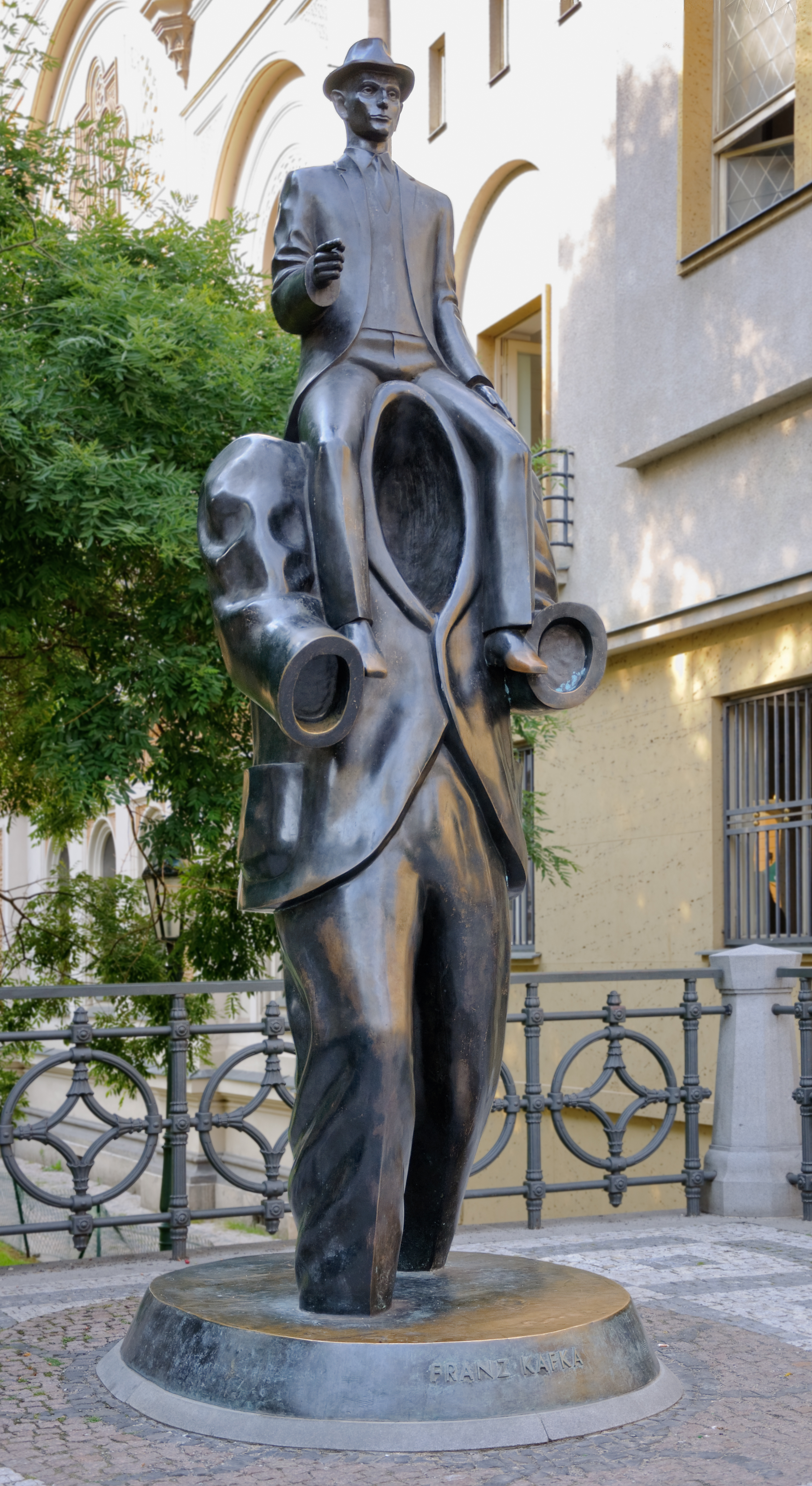
Statue of Franz Kafka in Prague

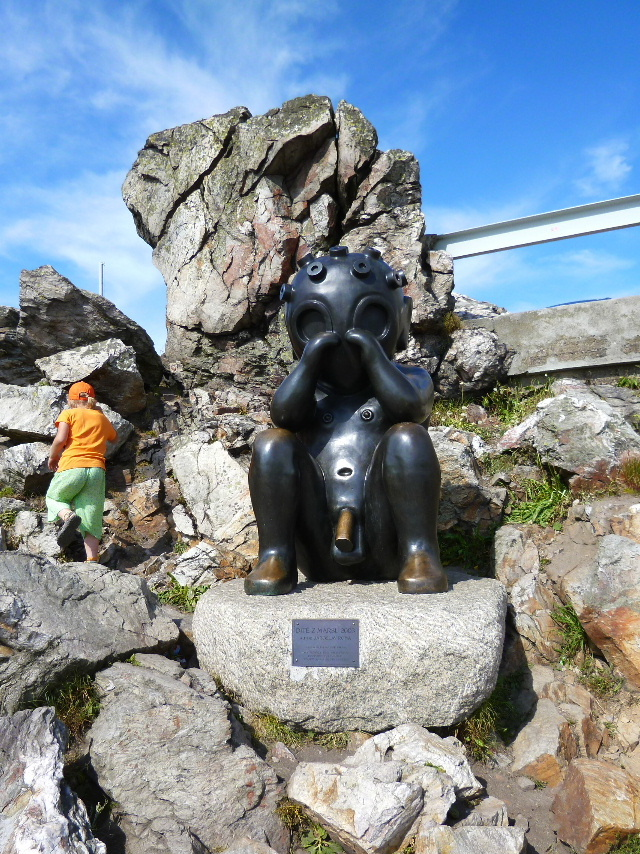
Dítě z Marsu (Child from Mars – 2003)

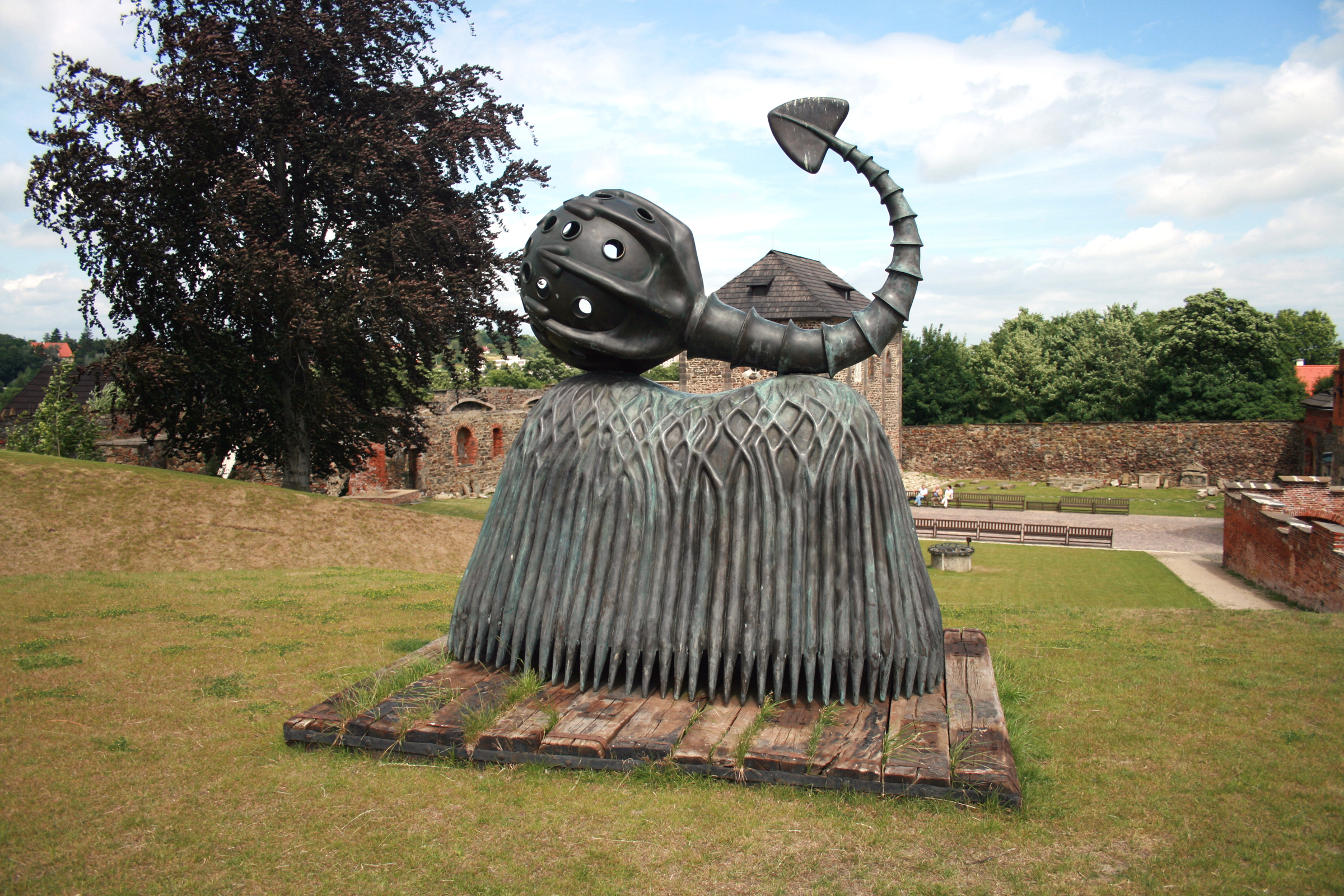
Sephia, Cheb, Czech Republic
