= A Little Woman =

1923 short story

- Short story by Franz Kafka
- Original title: 'Eine kleine Frau'
- Translator: Francis C. Golfing (1943); Willa and Edwin Muir (1948)
- Country: Germany
- Language: German
- Genre(s): Short story

Publication
- Published in: Prager Tagblatt
- Publication type: periodical
- Publication date: 20 April 1924
- Published in English: 1943

"A Little Woman" (German: "Eine kleine Frau") is a short story by Franz Kafka written between December 1923 and the end of January 1924. It was first published in the Easter supplement of Prager Tagblatt on 20 April 1924. During his final illness Kafka corrected the proofs of the story for the inclusion into collection A Hunger Artist (Ein Hungerkünstler) published by Verlag Die Schmiede after his death.

== Plot summary ==
The story begins with a detailed description of an anxious young woman. The woman is frustrated with the narrator for some reason which he cannot understand as they are strangers. The narrator contemplates the situation and wonders what will help the little woman with her obsessive frustration with him. He considers that even committing suicide would not affect her anger at him. The reliability of the narrator is not a given, and sometimes there seems the suggestion that he is not the actual source of the woman's irritation, but merely considers himself to be so.

== Process of writing ==
At the end of September 1923 Kafka moved to Berlin-Steglitz with Dora Dymant where he wrote "A Little Woman," based on their landlady.

== Publication history (in English) ==
- 1943; translated by Francis C. Golffing, Accent, Summer 1943, pp. 223-227.
- 1948; translated by Willa and Edwin Muir, in The Penal Colony, New York, Schocken Books, 320 p.
