= Prometheus (short story) =

Short story by Franz Kafka

- Short story by Franz Kafka
- Language: German
- Genre: Short story

Publication
- Published in: Beim Bau der Chinesischen Mauer
- Media type: book (hardcover)
- Publication date: 1931
- Published in English: 1933 London, Martin Secker; 1946 New York, Schocken Books

"Prometheus" (German: "Prometheus") is a short story by Franz Kafka written between 1917 and 1923, likely in 1918. The story presents four versions of the myth of Prometheus, concerning his fate after he was chained to a cliff for betraying the secrets of the gods to men. It was not published in Kafka's lifetime, first appearing in Beim Bau der Chinesischen Mauer (1931). The first English translation by Willa and Edwin Muir was published by Martin Secker in London in 1933. It appeared in The Great Wall of China. Stories and Reflections (New York City: Schocken Books, 1946).
