= Statue of Franz Kafka =

Statue in Prague, Czech Republic

- Socha Franze Kafky (Czech)
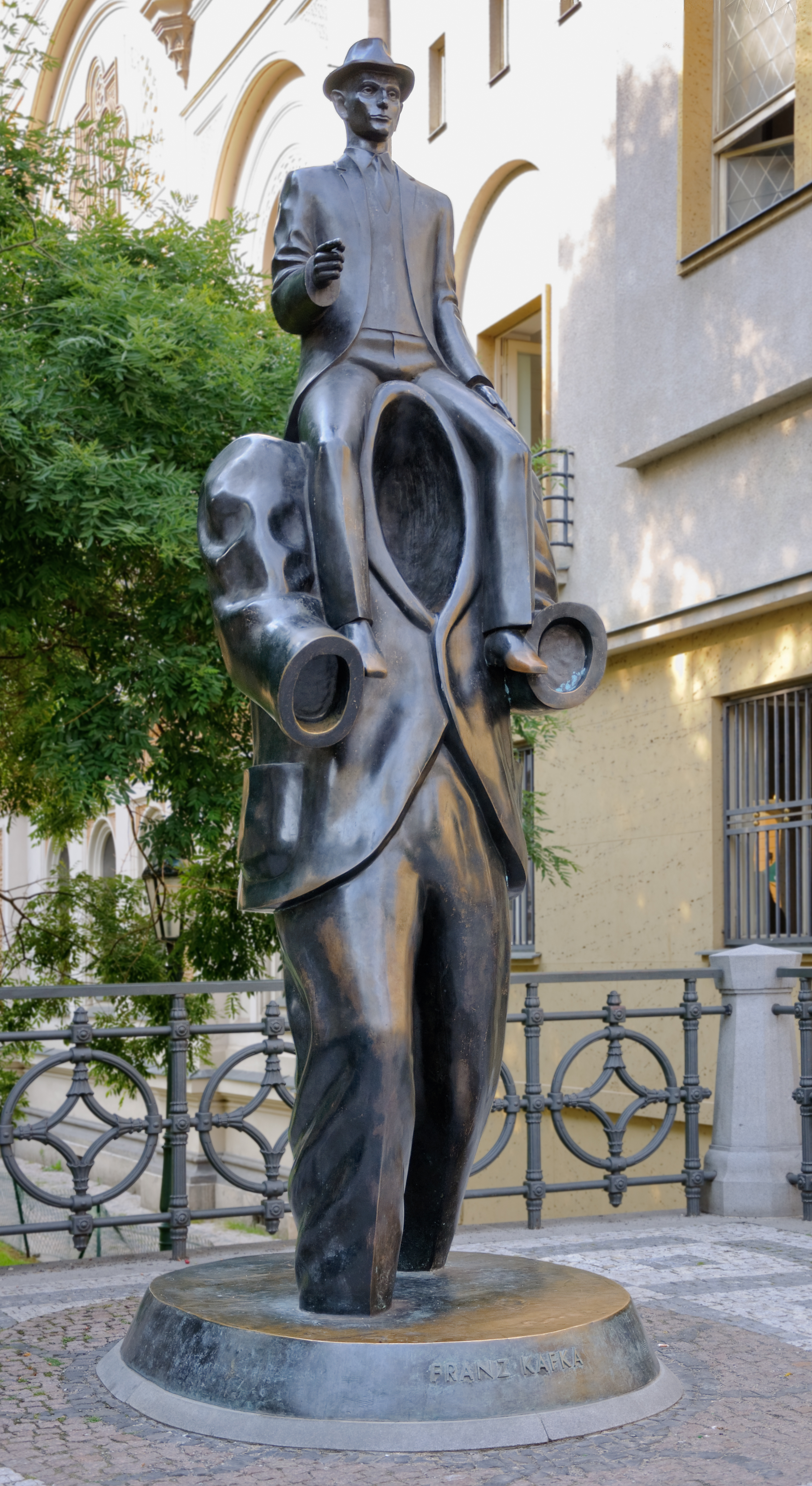
- The statue in 2011
- Artist: Jaroslav Róna
- Type: Sculpture
- Location: Prague, Czech Republic; 50°5′24.4″N 14°25′14.6″E

A statue of Franz Kafka (Czech: Socha Franze Kafky) by artist Jaroslav Róna was installed on Vězeňská street in the Jewish Quarter of Prague, Czech Republic in December 2003. It is situated near the Spanish Synagogue. It depicts Franz Kafka riding on the shoulders of a headless figure, in reference to the author's 1912 story "Description of a Struggle" (Beschreibung eines Kampfes).

== See also ==
- 2003 in art
