= The Bridge (short story) =

- Short story by Franz Kafka
- Original title: Die Brücke
- Language: German
- Genre: Short story

Publication
- Published in: Beim Bau der Chinesischen Mauer
- Media type: book (hardcover)
- Publication date: 1931
- Published in English: 1933 London, Martin Secker; 1946 New York, Schocken Books

"The Bridge" (German: "Die Brücke") is a short story by Franz Kafka. It was published posthumously in Beim Bau der Chinesischen Mauer (Berlin, 1931). The first English translation by Willa and Edwin Muir was published by Martin Secker in London in 1933. It appeared in The Great Wall of China. Stories and Reflections (New York City: Schocken Books, 1946).

The story is told from the first person point of view. In the tale, the bridge discusses how, above the ravine, it grasps onto each end. When someone, or something, begins to suddenly place pressure on the structure, it collapses. The last sentence mentions it is breaking apart, falling upon the jagged rocks below.

== Analysis ==
The Bridge is one of many very short pieces by Kafka (flash fiction) yet it is ripe with meaning. The bridge demonstrates human characteristics so at least one interpretation is that the events described are taking place within the mind of a distressed person. It is an analogy between human and bridge, bridge's consciousness equated to human's. When the bridge was torn into pieces by the peacefully lying sharp rocks below it is an allusion that in some contexts, the most peaceful thing that we've considered becomes instrumental in our destruction.
