= The Next Village =

Short story by Franz Kafka

"The Next Village" (German: "Das nächste Dorf") is a short story by Franz Kafka written between 1917 and 1923. The story presents a grandfather's comment that life is too short even to get to the neighbouring village.
