= The Warden of the Tomb =

Literary work

The Warden of the Tomb (Der Gruftwächter) is an expressionist play by Franz Kafka. Written in the winter of 1916–1917, it was published for the first time in Description of a Struggle.

== Characters ==
Speaking roles: The Prince Leo, The Chamberlain, The Servant, The Warden, The Steward, The Princess

Non-speaking roles: The Duke Friedrich, The Countess Isabella, The granddaughter.

== Plot summary ==
The story could be said to start in medias res, that is, in the middle of an action. Apparently there has been a conversation between the Prince and the Chamberlain, who does not agree to the Prince's proposal. We soon learn that the Prince wants to place a guard in the tomb of his ancestors, this in addition to the warden in the park above the tomb. The Warden is brought in, hesitant to speak in front of the Chamberlain. The Chamberlain exits and the old warden reveals to the Prince the nature of his work and his current struggles with one Duke Friedrich, who calls to his window at the hour of midnight. The Warden also speaks of a Countess Isabella, who wishes to go out of the park to offer the Prince her hand, and when the Prince ponders this a servant enters to announce that the Princess awaits him.

When the Prince exits, the Chamberlain and Steward enter the room. At this action, the warden tries to hide under a divan. The Steward speaks of the state of the Court, that the Prince has a dual nature and that the situation is desperate, apparently in attempts to convince the Chamberlain that he'd better not follow the Prince down the wrong track.
