= Blumfeld, an Elderly Bachelor =

- Short story by Franz Kafka
- Language: German
- Genre: Fiction

Publication
- Published in: Description of a Struggle
- Media type: Print

"Blumfeld, an Elderly Bachelor" (German: "Blumfeld, ein älterer Junggeselle") is an incomplete story by Franz Kafka. Likely written circa 1915, it first appeared in 1936 in the collection Beschreibung eines Kampfes (Description of a Struggle).

It relates part of the life of Blumfeld, an elderly bachelor, who upon arriving home finds two balls bouncing off the ground of their own accord. The balls follow him wherever he goes, and they clearly annoy him. The action continues into the next day, following his attempt to be rid of the balls. After finding an apparent solution, he goes off to work, where he interacts with those around him.

An entry from Kafka's Diaries, dated February 9, 1915, could refer to "Blumfeld":

Just now read the beginning. It is ugly and gives me a headache. In spite of all its truth, it is wicked, pedantic, mechanical, a fish barely breathing on a sandbank.

A reimagining of the story by Carter Scholz is featured in Kafka Americana.

In 2017 the Blumfeld work was written about extensively in Guernica Magazine, with photos and detailed examinations of Kafka's "instability is all" tone and execution.
