= A Visit to a Mine =

Short story by Franz Kafka

"A Visit to a Mine" (German: "Ein Besuch im Bergwerk") is a short story by Franz Kafka. The story is told by a narrator who is planning the drilling of a mine. It opens with orders from above to the workers around the mine. The narrator details the elaborate rank and file system among the workers. There are ten engineers and nine of them have specified functions. For example, one measures the area of the tunnel, while another follows him, preparing to drill. There is a suggestion that within the bureaucratic structure there is a lack of efficiency. At least one engineer serves to answer the question that "another does not want to ask." The story ends with the narrator and the other engineers, taking notes, inspecting, and measuring.

At least one author has pointed to similarities between this story and Freudian analysis, interpreting each character as representing the various states of unconscious desires.
