= Wedding Preparations in the Country =

- Short story by Franz Kafka
- First edition
- Original title: Hochzeitsvorbereitungen auf dem Lande
- Language: German

Publication
- Publisher: Secker & Warburg
- Publication date: 1954

"Wedding Preparations in the Country" (German: "Hochzeitsvorbereitungen auf dem Lande") is an incomplete work by Franz Kafka which depicts in great detail the journey of the groom, Raban, travelling to the country to meet his future wife, Betty. Written between 1907 and 1908, three fragments with missing pages have survived, and, as with most of Kafka's work, they were published after his death by his friend Max Brod. According to Brod, Kafka's intention was to complete the story as a novel. An English translation of the story appears in The Complete Stories of Franz Kafka.
