= The Vulture (short story) =

Short story by Franz Kafka

"The Vulture" (German: "Der Geier") is a short story by Franz Kafka, written sometime between 1917 and 1923.

== Plot summary ==
A vulture hacks at the protagonist's feet until a man passing by asks him why he doesn't do anything about it. The protagonist explains that he is helpless to resist, though at first he tried to drive the vulture away, when he saw that it was about to attack his face he stopped, preferring to sacrifice his feet. The onlooker exclaims, "Fancy letting yourself be tortured like this!", and offers to go and get a gun to shoot the vulture. The protagonist asks him to hurry. The vulture listens to the conversation, then takes wing and thrusts its beak into the protagonist's head, killing him, but also drowning in his blood, as it flows on "filling every depth, flooding every shore."

== Analysis ==
This text has often been compared with Kafka's Prometheus, with the vulture substituted for the eagle. Vultures were believed by the ancient Egyptians, and later by Renaissance thinkers, to be invariably female, and self-impregnating.

The title of the text, "Der Geier", is also laden with diverse connotations. The term "geyer" is Yiddish for "peddler", and is a common German surname. Engels' 1850 The Peasant War in Germany highlights the life of Florian Geyer, the nobleman who died fighting alongside the peasants in the 16th century German Peasants' War, and whose ill-fated Black Company became much celebrated in German-language song and fable.

== References and allusions in other media ==
- Israeli artist Yosl Bergner created a series of etchings inspired by the story named The Vulture by Franz Kafka in 1990.
- Jorge Luis Borges selected the story for inclusion in The Library of Babel, a series of short volumes published by Italian publisher Franco Maria Ricci starting from 1975.
- A comics adaptation of the story, illustrated by Peter Kuper, is included in Give It Up!.
- A parody of the story appears as part of the short story "The Notebooks of Bob K." by Jonathan Lethem, which is collected in Kafka Americana. In the story the vulture is replaced by the Batman villain The Penguin.
