= Nahum Norbert Glatzer =

Austrian and American Jewish literary scholar

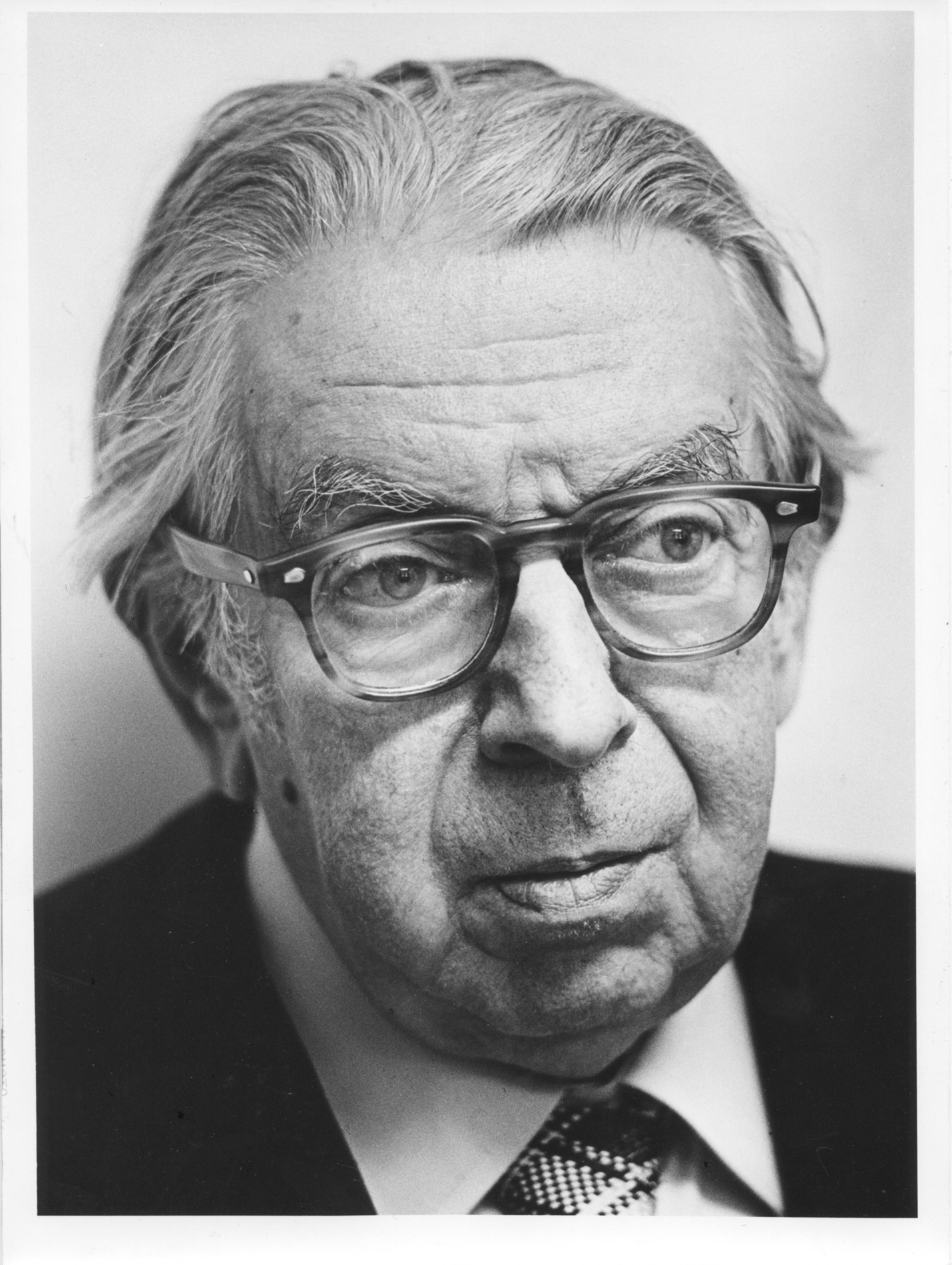
- Born: March 25, 1903; Lemberg, Austria-Hungary (now Lviv, Ukraine)
- Died: February 27, 1990 (aged 86); Tucson, Arizona, U.S.

Academic background
- Influences: Franz Rosenzweig, Martin Buber

Academic work
- School or tradition: Jewish history and philosophy

Nahum Norbert Glatzer (German: [ˈɡlatsɐ]; March 25, 1903 – February 27, 1990) was an Austrian and American scholar of Jewish history and philosophy from antiquity to mid 20th century.

== Life ==
Glatzer was born in Lemberg, then part of the Austro-Hungarian Empire (now Lviv, Ukraine). At the start of World War I his family moved westward to Bodenbach in Silesia where Norbert attended Gymnasium. At age 17, his father sent him to study with Solomon Breuer in Frankfurt, Germany with the intention that he would become a Rabbi. After encountering the circle of Jewish intellectuals, including Franz Rosenzweig, around Rabbi Nehemiah Anton Nobel he decided against the rabbinate. In July 1920, Rosenzweig invited Glatzer to join the newly established Freies Jüdisches Lehrhaus, where he taught biblical exegesis, Hebrew, and the Midrash. He also prepared an index of the Jewish sources for the second edition of Rosenzweig's The Star of Redemption. Glatzer completed a doctoral dissertation at the Goethe University Frankfurt in December 1931 under the supervision of Martin Buber, Paul Tillich and Jacob Horowitz. In 1932, Glatzer became Lecturer in Jewish Religious Philosophy and Ethics at the university, succeeding Buber.

After the National Socialists came to power in 1933, Glatzer and his wife, who was pregnant with their son Daniel, departed on a belated honeymoon trip. It was intended as a last vacation before the birth of their child and included stops in Paris and London. While at his in-laws in London, Nahum and his wife were told it was too dangerous for them to return to Frankfurt and they stayed in London. Anne's younger brother Richard was sent to Frankfurt to retrieve all of their belongings.

From London, Glatzer wrote to Martin Buber on April 27, 1933, that his faculty position had been suspended as a consequence of the passage of the Law for the Restoration of the Professional Civil Service on April 7, 1933.

From 1933 to 1937, Nahum Glatzer taught Jewish history at the Beit Sefer Reali, a secondary school, in Haifa. After failing to secure a position at the Hebrew University of Jerusalem, Glatzer left again for London toward the end of 1937. From there, he accepted a teaching position at the Hebrew College in Chicago and he, his wife, Anny née Stiebel, and son immigrated to the United States. He subsequently taught at Hebrew Teacher's college in Boston. Glatzer was editor-in-chief of Schocken Books from 1946 to 1951 and remained affiliated as Senior Consulting Editor until 1987. Glatzer was professor of Jewish Philosophy and Ethics at Brandeis University from 1951 to 1973, serving as a Guggenheim Fellow in 1959–1960. He then became University Professor in Religion at Boston University from 1973 to 1986. In 1976, he was elected to membership in the American Academy of Arts and Sciences and was the recipient of seven honorary degrees. he died in Tucson Arizona USA in early 1990 at 86.

== Personal life ==
Nahum Norbert Glatzer married Anne Stiebel in January 1932. A son, Daniel Franz, was born in Haifa, Palestine in 1933 and a daughter, Judith Eve, in Chicago in 1940. Glatzer has two granddaughters, Johanna Wechsler and Rina Redrup.

== Scholarship ==
Glatzer's scholarship ranged from Ancient history to modern Jewish philosophy and literature. He edited volumes on the German Enlightenment thinker Leopold Zunz and on the philosophers Martin Buber and Franz Rosenzweig. Glatzer also became known for his many anthologies of source material covering the breadth of Jewish interpretive texts, midrash and Mishnah, as well as literature.

Glatzer's first anthology Sendung und Schicksal [ET Mission and Fate] (edited with Ludwig Strauss) was published by Schocken Verlag in 1931. Schoken Press also published his dissertation, Untersuchungen zu Geschichtslehre der Tannaiten: Ein Beitrag zur Religionsgeschichte [ET Investigations into the Philosophy of History of the Tannaim: A Contribution to the History of Religion] in 1932.

Glatzer introduced Franz Rosenzweig to an English readership through his biography, Rosenzweig: His Life and Thought (1953) and edited several more volumes on the philosopher.

Glatzer championed the writings of Franz Kafka to American audiences. Glatzer edited I am a Memory Come Alive: Autobiographical Writings by Franz Kafka as well as a number of other English translations of Kafka, including Parables and Paradoxes, the diaries and letters. In 1985, Glatzer published his final book, The Loves of Franz Kafka.

The Memoirs of Nahum N. Glatzer was published posthumously in 1997.
