= Give It Up! (short story) =

- Short story by Franz Kafka
- Country: Germany
- Language: German
- Genre(s): Fiction

Publication
- Publication date: 1936
- Published in English: 1958

"Give It Up!" (German: "Gibs auf!") is a short story by Franz Kafka written between 1917 and 1923. The story was not published in Kafka's lifetime, but first appeared in Beschreibung eines Kampfes (1936, Description of a Struggle, translated 1958).

A comic-book adaptation of the story, illustrated by Peter Kuper, is included in Give It Up!.
