= Willa Muir =

Scottish novelist, essayist and translator

- Willa Muir in 1967
- Born: 13 March 1890; Montrose, Angus, Scotland
- Died: 22 May 1970 (aged 80); Dunoon, Scotland
- Education: University of St Andrews
- Occupations: Novelist; essayist; translator
- Writing career
- Language: English
- Genres: Fiction, novel, short story, essay
- Notable works: Imagined Corners, Mrs Ritchie, Women: An Inquiry, The Trial (translator)
- Notable awards: Johann-Heinrich-Voß-Preis für Übersetzung award
- Literary movement: Modernism

Willa Muir (née Anderson; 13 March 1890 – 22 May 1970), also known as Agnes Neill Scott, was a Scottish novelist, essayist and translator. She was the major part of a translation partnership with her husband, Edwin Muir. She and her husband translated the works of many notable German-language authors including Franz Kafka. In 1958, Willa and Edwin Muir were granted the first Johann-Heinrich-Voss Translation Award.

== Life ==
Willa Muir was born Wilhelmina Johnston Anderson in 1890 in Montrose, where she spent her childhood. Her parents were originally from Unst in the Shetland Islands, and the Shetland dialect of the Scots language was spoken at home. She was one of the first Scottish women to attend university, and she studied classics at the University of St Andrews, graduating in 1910 with a first class degree. In 1919 she married the poet Edwin Muir and gave up her job in London as assistant principal of Gipsy Hill teacher training college.

In the 1920s the couple lived in continental Europe for two periods, living in Montrose at other times. During their first period, she supported them by teaching at the Internationalschule in Hellerau, which was run by her friend A. S. Neill.

Willa and her husband worked together on many translations, most notable the major works of Franz Kafka. They had translated The Castle within six years of Kafka's death. In her memoir of Edwin Muir, Belonging, Willa describes the method of translation that she and her husband adopted in their Kafka translations:

"We divided the book in two, Edwin translated one half and I the other, then we went over each other's translations as with a fine-tooth comb."

Willa was the more able linguist and she was the major contributor. She recorded in her journal that her husband "only helped". Between 1924 and the start of the Second World War their translation work financed their life together. In addition she also translated on her own account under the name of Agnes Neill Scott. The couple spent considerable time touring in Europe and she expressed some regret that she had lost a home.

A satirical portrait of Willa and Edwin appears in Wyndham Lewis's The Apes of God (1930). When Willa and her husband met Lewis in the mid-1920s, she recorded her sense that he was "one of those Englishmen who do not have the habit of talking to women."

Her book Women: An Inquiry is a book-length feminist essay. Her 1936 book Mrs Grundy in Scotland is an investigation of the anxieties and pressure to conform to respectability norms in Scottish life.

In 1944 she was painted by Nigel McIsaac; the painting is in the Scottish National Portrait Gallery.

In 1958, Willa and Edwin Muir were granted the first Johann-Heinrich-Voss Translation Award. Her husband died in 1959 and she wrote a memoir Belonging (1968) about their life together. She died at Dunoon in 1970.

== Works ==
=== Novels ===
- Imagined Corners (1931)
- Mrs Ritchie (1933)
- The Usurpers (2023)

=== Translations as Agnes Neill Scott ===
- Boyhood and Youth by Hans Carossa (1931)
- A Roumanian Diary by Hans Carossa (1929)
- Doctor Gion, etc. by Hans Carossa (1933)
- Life Begins by Christa Winsloe (1935)
- The Child Manuela by Christa Winsloe (1934)

=== Translations by Willa and Edwin Muir ===
- Power by Lion Feuchtwanger, New York, Viking Press, 1926.
- The Ugly Duchess: A Historical Romance by Lion Feuchtwanger, London, Martin Secker, 1927.
- Two Anglo-Saxon Plays: The Oil Islands and Warren Hastings, by Lion Feuchtwanger, London, Martin Secker, 1929.
- Success: A Novel by Lion Feuchtwanger, New York, Viking Press, 1930.
- The Castle by Franz Kafka, London, Martin Secker, 1930.
- The Sleepwalkers: A Trilogy by Hermann Broch, Boston, MA, Little, Brown & Company, 1932.
- Josephus by Lion Feuchtwanger, New York, Viking Press, 1932.
- Three Cities by Sholem Asch, London, Victor Gollancz Ltd, 1933.
- Salvation by Sholem Asch, New York, G.P. Putnam's Sons, 1934.
- The Hill of Lies by Heinrich Mann, London, Jarrolds, 1934.
- Mottke, the Thief by Sholem Asch, New York, G.P. Putnam's Sons, 1935.
- The Unknown Quantity by Hermann Broch, New York, Viking Press, 1935.
- The Jew of Rome: A Historical Romance by Lion Feuchtwanger, London, Hutchinson, 1935.
- The Loom of Justice by Ernst Lothar, New York, G.P. Putnam's Sons, 1935.
- Night over the East by Erik von Kuehnelt-Leddihn, London, Sheed & Ward, 1936.
- Amerika by Franz Kafka, New York, Doubleday/New Directions, 1946
- The Trial by Franz Kafka, London, Martin Secker, 1937, reissued New York, The Modern Library, 1957.
- Metamorphosis and Other Stories by Franz Kafka, Harmondsworth, Penguin Books, 1961.

=== Other ===
- Women: An Inquiry (Hogarth Press, 1925)
- Mrs Grundy in Scotland ("The Voice of Scotland" series, Routledge, 1936)
- Women in Scotland (Left Review, 1936)
- Living with Ballads (Oxford University Press, 1965)
- Belonging: a memoir (1968)
- "Elizabeth" and "A Portrait of Emily Stobo", Chapman 71 (1992–93)
- "Clock-a-doodle-do", M. Burgess ed., The Other Voice, (1987)
- "Mrs Muttoe and the Top Storey", Aileen Christianson, Moving in Circles: Willa Muir's Writings, Edinburgh, Word Power Books, 2007.
