= The Helmsman =

Short story by Franz Kafka

"The Helmsman" (German: "Der Steuermann") is a short story by Franz Kafka, written sometime between 1917 and 1923. The story deals with a man who is deposed from his role as a helmsman and complains that his shipmates refuse to help him regain his rightful position.

== Plot summary ==
The story begins with a struggle between the helmsman, who narrates, and a stranger who refuses to accept his position, takes over the helm and drives the narrator away. The helmsman goes to his shipmates to complain and get their help, but, although they agree that he is the true helmsman, they seem to be hypnotized by the stranger, and do nothing to drive him away. When the stranger tells them not to disturb him, they withdraw, leaving the narrator to wonder, "What kind of people are these? Do they ever think, or do they only shuffle pointlessly over the earth?"

The story was not published in Kafka's lifetime. It first appeared in Beschreibung eines Kampfes (Prague: Verlag Heinrich Mercy Sohn, 1936). An English translation by Tania and James Stern was first published in Description of a Struggle (New York: Schocken Books, 1958).

A comic-book adaptation of the story, illustrated by Peter Kuper, is included in Give It Up!.
