= Fellowship (short story) =

"Fellowship" (German: "Gemeinschaft") is a short story by Franz Kafka. Five people appear to enjoy being a group, but when a sixth person hopes to join, he is refused admittance. He perseveres, and after some time the others come to respect his interest in the group, but they still reject him. In his Letters to Felice Kafka referred to the story as autobiographical in nature.

Michael Greenberg has argued that this story is about the unavoidable paradox involved in needing human contact.
