= Hyperion (magazine) =

- Founder: Franz Blei; Carl Sternheim
- First issue: 1908
- Final issue: 1910
- Country: Germany
- Based in: Munich
- Language: German

Hyperion was a German bimonthly literary magazine published out of Munich by Franz Blei and Carl Sternheim. Between 1908 and 1910, twelve booklets in ten editions appeared.

It was an expensively produced booklet with modern graphics created by Walter Tiemann. Not only were major authors published in the magazine, but also unknown and first-published authors.

The first eight prose works of Franz Kafka appeared in the magazine: The Trees (Die Bäume), Clothes (Kleider), The Rejection (Die Abweisung), The Businessman (Der Kaufmann), Absent-minded Window-gazing (Zerstreutes Hinausschaun), The Way Home (Der Nachhauseweg), Passers-by (Die Vorüberlaufenden) and On the Tram (Der Fahrgast).

== Artists and writers ==
=== Artists ===
- Aubrey Beardsley
- Erich Heckel
- Aristide Maillol
- Auguste Rodin
- Paul Signac
- Heinrich Kley

=== Writers ===
- Franz Blei
- Rudolf Borchardt
- Max Brod
- Hans Carossa
- Paul Claudel
- Carl Einstein
- André Gide
- Hugo von Hofmannsthal
- Franz Kafka
- Heinrich Mann
- George Meredith
- Robert Musil
- Rainer Maria Rilke
- René Schickele
- Carl Sternheim
