= The Test (short story) =

Short story by Franz Kafka

"The Test" (German: "Die Prüfung") is a short story by Franz Kafka that comprises a conversation between two men. The titular test, which has been described as an exercise in "question questioning", is a mental exercise by one of the conversants, who sees whether the other behaves the way he expects.
