= The Conscription of Troops =

"The Conscription of Troops" (German: "Die Truppenaushebung") is a short story by Franz Kafka.

== Plot ==
The story details the process of conscripting troops, which is needed because of never-ending wars. First, every citizen reports to their homes, then a weak and tired-looking nobleman inspects each residence to ensure the presence of everyone on his list. A group of support soldiers is always waiting for this process since dawn.

The narrator explains situations that sometimes occur. Occasionally a man on the list is missing and is trying to hide, not to evade military service but because the "command" is so frighteningly great. The noble official punishes such men with a whip, but he is so weak that he can't inflict much pain. The narrator says such men are rarely recruited. A more frequent situation is that extra people are present who are not on the list. For example, a young woman from another town has shown up among the group of men, and her attempt at conscription is widely acknowledged as a rite of passage of women. Her travelling to the conscription is never refused by her family, she dresses up, and her manner changes to an "inaccessible stranger." Such a woman is treated as a special holy-like figure when she arrives at the house of the current conscription. But she isn't noticed by the nobleman and she leaves in shame. The narrator explains that if the extra unaccounted person is a man rather than a woman, his desire to be conscripted is sincere but his being conscripted is out of the question.
