= Homecoming (short story) =

Short story by Franz Kafka

"Homecoming" (German: "Heimkehr") is a short story by Franz Kafka. A young man returns home and finds that his father does not express any feelings towards him. He recognizes the familiar terrain, such as his family's farm, but feels like a stranger. He stands at the door waiting, and feels a dread as it becomes apparent that he will always be on the outskirts both of his family and of his community.

It has been suggested that the story is essentially the Parable of the Prodigal Son inverted.
