= At Night (short story) =

Short story by Franz Kafka

"At Night" (German: "Nachts") is a very short story by Franz Kafka written in his notebooks.

As with many of the pieces in his notebooks, the tale is more of a segment than a story. The narrator reflects on the emptiness that can engulf one during nighttime. Yet, at the same time, where each person sleeps, there has been a rich history. Someone, the story says, must watch others at night, either for protection or posterity.

Gustav Janouch suggests that Kafka's tale was influenced both by his persistent insomnia and a desire to relate the potential dangers of people in society who are not watched when they should be.
