= The Top (short story) =

Short story by Franz Kafka

"The Top" (German: Der Kreisel) is a short story by Franz Kafka, likely written between 1917 and 1923. It concerns a philosopher's futile attempt to understand the world.

== Plot summary ==
A philosopher believes he can understand everything in the world if he understands a single element. To this purpose, he tries to catch a child's top as it spins, hoping that it will continue spinning in his hand, but it always stops the moment he grabs it.

== Interpretation ==
The top could be seen as a symbol of the spinning earth: the populated world which the philosopher tries to understand. The irony implied herein is that by focusing on the top itself, the philosopher ignores the other forces that set it in motion: the children and the string.

Some critics have noted a correspondence between the structure and theme of the story: the spiraling movement of the top is echoed by the spiraling structure of the story, as the sentences are at first of uniform length, then get gradually longer until the last line which is meandering and prolonged, like the top's last staggering spin and final collapse.

== Comic adaptation ==
A comic adaptation of the story, illustrated by Peter Kuper, is included in Give It Up!.
