= Martin Secker =

British publisher

Martin Secker (6 April 1882 – 6 April 1978), born Percy Martin Secker Klingender, was a London publisher who was responsible for producing the work of a distinguished group of literary authors, including D. H. Lawrence, Thomas Mann, Norman Douglas, Henry James, Compton Mackenzie, and George Orwell. He began publishing just before the First World War. Secker lived at Bridgefoot House, Iver, Buckinghamshire.

In 1935, Secker's original firm merged to form the new company of Secker & Warburg.
