= Edwin Muir =

Scottish writer (1887-1959)

- Born: 15 May 1887; Deerness, Orkney, Scotland
- Died: 3 January 1959 (aged 71); Cambridge, England
- Occupations: Poet, novelist, translator
- Writing career
- Language: English

Edwin Muir CBE (15 May 1887 – 3 January 1959) was a Scottish poet, novelist and translator. Born on a farm in Deerness, a parish of Orkney, Scotland, he is remembered for his deeply felt and vivid poetry written in plain language and with few stylistic preoccupations.

== Biography ==
Muir was born at the farm of Folly in Deerness, the same parish in which his mother was born. The family then moved to the island of Wyre, followed by a return to the Mainland, Orkney. In 1901, when he was 14, his father lost his farm, and the family moved to Glasgow. In his autobiography he wrote, "I'm an Orkneyman, a good Scandinavian". His parents and two brothers died within a few years. As a young man he worked in unpleasant jobs in factories and offices, including working in a factory that turned bones into charcoal. "He suffered psychologically in a most destructive way, although perhaps the poet of later years benefitted from these experiences as much as from his Orkney 'Eden'."

In 1919, Muir married Willa Anderson, and the couple moved to London. About this, Muir wrote simply 'My marriage was the most fortunate event in my life'. Edwin and Willa worked together on many translations; these were issued under their joint names. Notable among them were their translation of works by Franz Kafka. They had translated The Castle within six years of Kafka's death. In Belonging, her memoir of Edwin Muir, Willa describes the method of translation they adopted in their Kafka translations:

"We divided the book in two, Edwin translated one half and I the other, then we went over each other's translations as with a fine-tooth comb."

Willa was the more able linguist and the major contributor. Willa recorded in her journal that "It was ME" and that Edwin "only helped". Between 1924 and the start of the Second World War their translations financed their life together. They produced acclaimed English translations of Kafka, Lion Feuchtwanger, Gerhart Hauptmann, Sholem Asch, Heinrich Mann, and Hermann Broch. In 1958, Edwin and Willa were granted the first Johann-Heinrich-Voss Translation Award. Many of their translations of German novels are still in print.

Between 1921 and 1923, Muir lived in Prague, Dresden, Italy, Salzburg and Vienna; he returned to the UK in 1924. Between 1925 and 1956, Muir published seven volumes of poetry which were collected after his death and published in 1991 as The Complete Poems of Edwin Muir. From 1927 to 1932 he published three novels, and in 1935 he came to St Andrews, where he produced his controversial Scott and Scotland (1936). In 1939 in St Andrews, Muir had a religious experience and from then onwards thought of himself as Christian, seeing Christianity as being as revolutionary as socialism. From 1946 to 1949 he was Director of the British Council in Prague and Rome. 1950 saw his appointment as Warden of Newbattle Abbey College (a college for working-class men) in Midlothian, where he met fellow Orcadian poet, George Mackay Brown. He was awarded a CBE in the 1953 Coronation Honours. In 1955 he was made Norton Professor of English at Harvard University. He returned to Britain in 1956 and died in 1959 in Cambridge. He was buried in Swaffham Prior, Cambridgeshire.

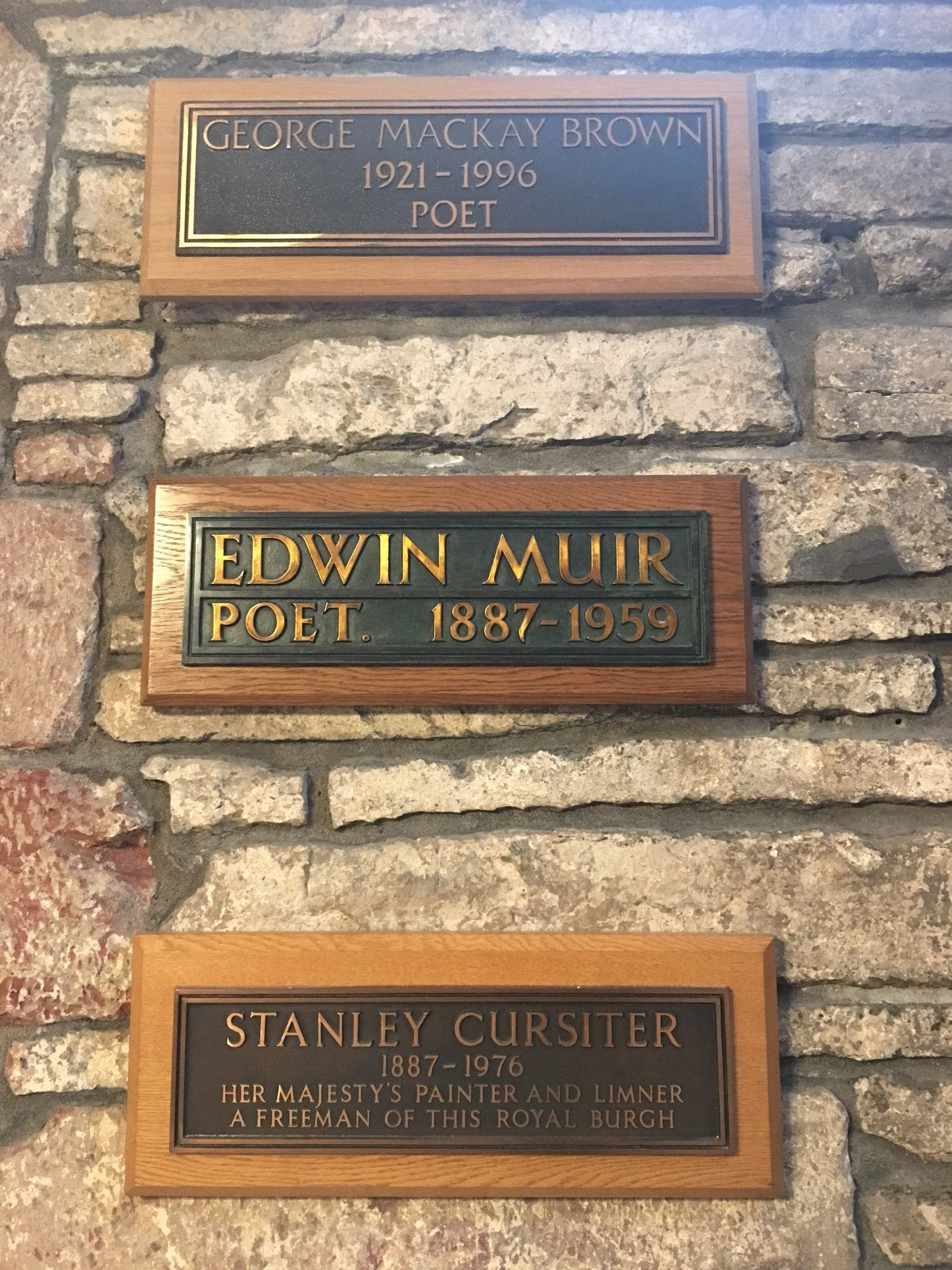
Memorial to Edwin Muir in St Magnus Cathedral, Kirkwall, Orkney

A memorial bench was erected in 1962 to Muir in Swanston, Edinburgh, where he spent time during the 1950s. His wife wrote a memoir of their life together in 1967. She lived for another eleven years and died on the Isle of Bute.

== Work ==
His childhood in remote and unspoiled Orkney represented an idyllic Eden to Muir, while his family's move to the city corresponded in his mind to a deeply disturbing encounter with the "fallen" world. Muir came to regard his family's movement from Orkney to Glasgow as a movement from Eden to Hell. The emotional tensions of that dichotomy shaped much of his work and deeply influenced his life. The following quotation expresses the basic existential dilemma of Muir's life:

"I was born before the Industrial Revolution, and am now about two hundred years old. But I have skipped a hundred and fifty of them. I was really born in 1737, and till I was fourteen no time-accidents happened to me. Then in 1751 I set out from Orkney for Glasgow. When I arrived I found that it was not 1751, but 1901, and that a hundred and fifty years had been burned up in my two-days' journey. But I myself was still in 1751, and remained there for a long time. All my life since I have been trying to overhaul that invisible leeway. No wonder I am obsessed with Time." (Extract from Diary 1937–39.)

His psychological distress led him to undergo Jungian analysis in London. A vision in which he witnessed the creation strengthened the Edenic myth in his mind, leading him to see his life and career as the working-out of an archetypal fable. In his Autobiography he wrote, "the life of every man is an endlessly repeated performance of the life of man...". He also expressed his feeling that our deeds on Earth constitute "a myth which we act almost without knowing it". Alienation, paradox, the existential dyads of good and evil, life and death, love and hate, and images of journeys and labyrinths are key elements in his work.

His Scott and Scotland advanced the claim that Scotland can create a national literature only by writing in English, an opinion that placed him in direct opposition to the Lallans movement of Hugh MacDiarmid. He had little sympathy for Scottish nationalism.

In 1965 a volume of his selected poetry was edited and introduced by T. S. Eliot.

== Legacy ==
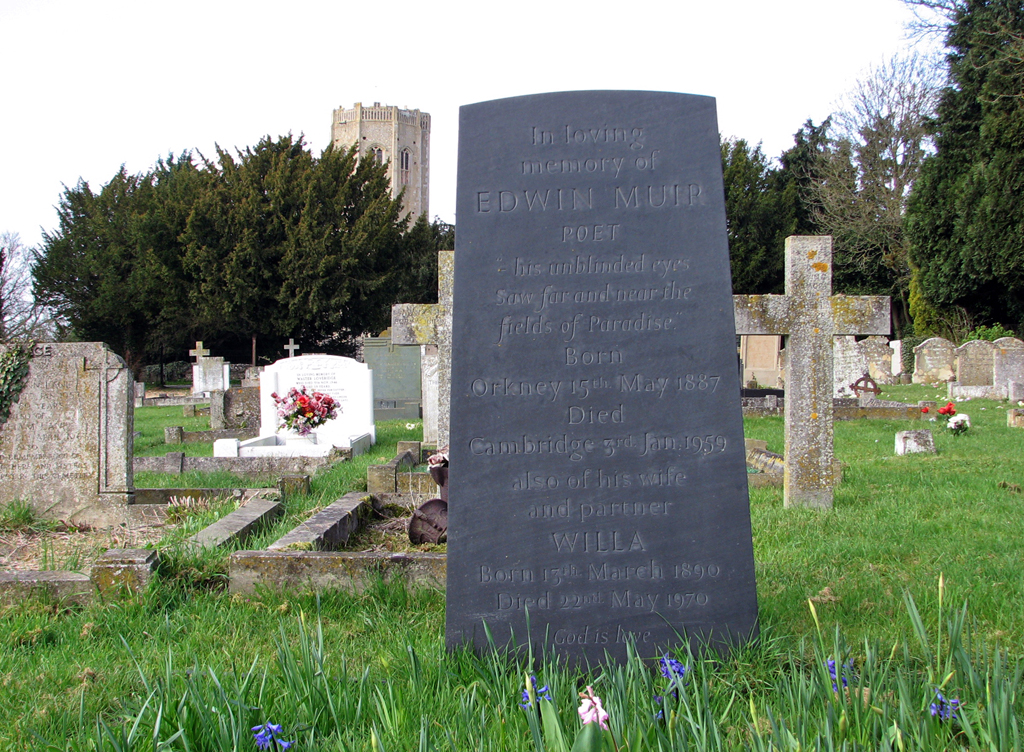
His grave at the Church of St Cyriac and St Julitta, Swaffham Prior in Cambridgeshire

In an appreciation of Muir's poetry in Texas Quarterly, the critic Kathleen Raine wrote in 1961: "Time does not fade [Muir's poems], and it becomes clear that their excellence owes nothing to the accidental circumstances of the moment at which the poet wrote, or we read, his poems; they survive, as it were, a change of background, and we begin to see that whereas the 'new' movements of this or that decade lose their significance when the scene changes and retain only a historical interest, Edwin Muir, a poet who never followed fashion, has in fact given more permanent expression to his world than other poets who deliberately set out to be the mouth-pieces of their generation."

Similarly, Joseph H. Summers, in a retrospective assessment in the Massachusetts Review, called Muir's achievement in poetry and prose "larger than the merely literary. He did not share in the modern attempts to deify poetry, or language, or even the human imagination. Implicit in all of his works is the recognition that there are things more important than literature—life and love, the physical world, the individual spirit within its body: those things in which the religious man recognizes the immediate work of God. Muir's triumph was less in the technological realm of communication than in the vastly more difficult realm of sensitivity, perception, wisdom, the things which he communicated. It was a triumph made possible only, in the familiar paradox, by humility."

== Works ==
- We Moderns: Enigmas and Guesses, under the pseudonym Edward Moore, London, George Allen & Unwin, 1918
- Latitudes, New York, B. W. Huebsch, 1924
- First Poems, London, Hogarth Press, 1925
- Chorus of the Newly Dead, London, Hogarth Press, 1926
- Transition: Essays on Contemporary Literature, London, Hogarth Press, 1926
- The Marionette, London, Hogarth Press, 1927
- The Structure of the Novel, London, Hogarth Press, 1928
- John Knox: Portrait of a Calvinist, London, Jonathan Cape, 1929
- The Three Brothers, London, Heinemann, 1931
- Poor Tom, London, J. M. Dent & Sons, 1932
- Variations on a Time Theme, London, J. M. Dent & Sons, 1934
- Scottish Journey London, Heinemann in association with Victor Gollancz, 1935
- Journeys and Places, London, J. M. Dent & Sons, 1937
- The Present Age from 1914, London, Cresset Press, 1939
- The Story and the Fable: An Autobiography, London, Harrap, 1940
- The Narrow Place, London, Faber, 1943
- The Scots and Their Country, London, published for the British Council by Longman, 1946
- The Voyage, and Other Poems, London, Faber, 1946
- Essays on Literature and Society, London, Hogarth Press, 1949
- The Labyrinth, London, Faber, 1949
- Collected Poems, 1921–1951, London, Faber, 1952
- An Autobiography, London : Hogarth Press, 1954
- Prometheus, illustrated by John Piper, London, Faber, 1954
- One Foot in Eden, New York, Grove Press, 1956
- New Poets, 1959 (edited), London, Eyre & Spottiswoode, 1959
- The Estate of Poetry, Cambridge, MA, Harvard University Press, 1962
- Collected Poems, London and New York, Oxford University Press, 1965
- The Politics of King Lear, New York, Haskell House, 1970

== Translations by Willa and Edwin Muir ==
- Power by Lion Feuchtwanger, New York, Viking Press, 1926
- The Ugly Duchess: A Historical Romance by Lion Feuchtwanger, London, Martin Secker, 1927
- Two Anglo-Saxon Plays: The Oil Islands and Warren Hastings, by Lion Feuchtwanger, London, Martin Secker, 1929
- Success: A Novel by Lion Feuchtwanger, New York, Viking Press, 1930
- The Castle by Franz Kafka, London, Martin Secker, 1930
- The Sleepwalkers: A Trilogy by Hermann Broch, Boston, MA, Little, Brown & Company, 1932
- Josephus by Lion Feuchtwanger, New York, Viking Press, 1932
- Salvation by Sholem Asch, New York, G.P. Putnam's Sons, 1934
- The Hill of Lies by Heinrich Mann, London, Jarrolds, 1934
- Mottke, the Thief by Sholem Asch, New York, G.P. Putnam's Sons, 1935
- The Unknown Quantity by Hermann Broch, New York, Viking Press, 1935
- The Jew of Rome: A Historical Romance by Lion Feuchtwanger, London, Hutchinson, 1935
- The Loom of Justice by Ernst Lothar, New York, G.P. Putnam's Sons, 1935
- Night over the East by Erik von Kuehnelt-Leddihn, London, Sheed & Ward, 1936
- The Pretender by Lion Feuchtwanger, New York, The Viking Press, 1937
- Amerika by Franz Kafka, New York, Doubleday/New Directions, 1946
- The Trial by Franz Kafka, London, Martin Secker, 1937, reissued New York, The Modern Library, 1957
- Metamorphosis and Other Stories by Franz Kafka, Harmondsworth, Penguin Books, 1961.
