= Der Kanon =

Canon of exemplary German literature

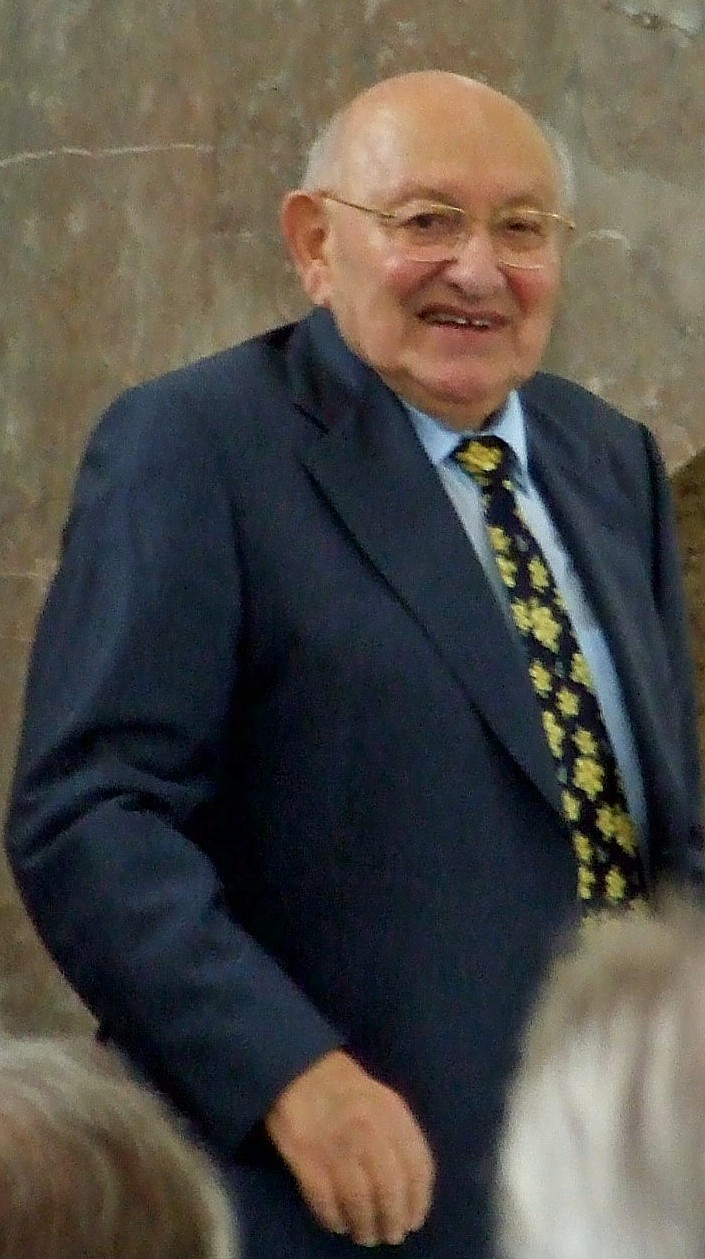
Marcel Reich-Ranicki

Der Kanon (German pronunciation: [deːɐ̯ ˈkaːnɔn], "The Canon") or more precisely Marcel-Reich-Ranickis Kanon is a large anthology of exemplary works of German literature. Edited by the literary critic Marcel Reich-Ranicki (1920–2013), he called the anthology, announced on 18 June 2001 in the German news magazine Der Spiegel under the title "The Canon of worthwhile German Works", his magnum opus. The five parts appeared from 2002 to 2006 published by Insel Verlag: 1. Novels (2002), 2. Tales/Stories (2003), 3. Dramatic Works (2004), 4. Poetry (2005), and 5. Essays (2006). As expected, the anthology met with opposition and criticism, and even the idea of an anthology was questioned, but Reich-Ranicki called this questioning "incomprehensible, because the lack of a canon would mean relapse into barbarism." Reich-Ranicki sought to differentiate his anthology from previous compilations in his hope to imagine a "reader judge" such as teachers, students, librarians, who would need to draw from this canon because they were in the "first line of those who deal with literature professionally."

The edited anthology takes the series title, Der Kanon. Die deutsche Literatur (The Canon of German Literature) in book form with slip cases.

- Der Kanon. Die deutsche Literatur. Romane. 20 Volumes (2002), ISBN 3-458-06678-0
- Der Kanon. Die deutsche Literatur. Erzählungen. 10 Volumes and 1 Companion Volume (2003), ISBN 3-458-06760-4
- Der Kanon. Die deutsche Literatur. Dramen. 8 Volumes and 1 Companion Volume (2004), ISBN 3-458-06780-9
- Der Kanon. Die deutsche Literatur. Gedichte. 7 Volumes and 1 Companion Volume (2005), ISBN 3-458-06785-X
- Der Kanon. Die deutsche Literatur. Essays. 5 Volumes und 1 Companion Volume (2006), ISBN 3-458-06830-9

== Main contents ==
=== Early works ===
- The Nibelungenlied
- Walter von der Vogelweide: Poems
- Martin Luther, trans.: The Bible (excerpts)
- Andreas Gryphius: Poems
- Christian Hofmann von Hofmannswaldau: Poems

=== 18th century ===
- Johann Christian Günther: Poems
- Gotthold Ephraim Lessing: Minna von Barnhelm; Hamburg Dramaturgy (excerpts); Nathan der Weise
- Johann Wolfgang von Goethe: Die Leiden des jungen Werthers; Faust I; Aus meinem Leben: Dichtung und Wahrheit (excerpts); Poems
- Friedrich Schiller: Kabale und Liebe "or" Maria Stuart; Die Schaubühne als eine moralische Anstalt Betrachtet (The Theatre considered as a Moral Institution) (excerpts), Don Carlos; On Naive and Sentimental Poetry, Wallenstein, Ballads.

=== 19th century ===
- Johann Peter Hebel: Schatzkästlein des rheinischen Hausfreundes (selections)
- Friedrich Hölderlin: Hyperion oder der Eremit in Griechenland (excerpts); Poems
- Novalis: Poems
- Friedrich von Schlegel: Essays
- E. T. A. Hoffmann: The Serapion Brethren (excerpts)
- Heinrich von Kleist: The Marquise of O, Michael Kohlhaas; The Prince of Homburg; Short Stories (selected)
- Clemens Brentano: Poems
- Adelbert von Chamisso: Peter Schlemihls wundersame Geschichte
- Joseph Freiherr von Eichendorff: Poems
- Ferdinand Raimund: Der Verschwender
- August Graf von Platen: Poems
- Annette von Droste-Hülshoff: Die Judenbuche; Poems
- Heinrich Heine: Poems; Prose (selected)
- Eduard Mörike: Poems
- Georg Büchner: Dantons Tod; Woyzeck; Lenz
- Theodor Storm: Short Stories (selected)
- Gottfried Keller: Short Stories (selected)
- Theodor Fontane: Schach von Wuthenow; Frau Jenny Treibel or Der Stechlin; Effi Briest
- Friedrich Nietzsche: Essays

=== 20th century ===
- Arthur Schnitzler: La Ronde; Leutnant Gustl; Professor Bernhardi
- Gerhart Hauptmann: Die Ratten
- Frank Wedekind: Frühlings Erwachen
- Stefan George: Poems
- Else Lasker-Schüler: Poems
- Heinrich Mann: Professor Unrat
- Christian Morgenstern: Gedichte
- Hugo von Hofmannsthal: Der Schwierige
- Karl Kraus: Essays
- Thomas Mann: Buddenbrooks; Tonio Kröger; Tristan; Der Tod in Venedig; Mario und der Zauberer; Essays
- Rainer Maria Rilke: Poems
- Hermann Hesse: Unterm Rad
- Carl Sternheim: Der Snob
- Robert Walser: Jakob von Gunten; Erzählungen
- Alfred Döblin: Die Ermordung einer Butterblume; Berlin Alexanderplatz
- Robert Musil: Die Verwirrungen des Zöglings Törleß; Tonka
- Franz Kafka: Der Process; Die Verwandlung; Ein Bericht für eine Akademie; In der Strafkolonie; Ein Hungerkünstler
- Gottfried Benn: Poems
- Georg Heym: Poems
- Georg Trakl: Poems
- Kurt Tucholsky: Feuilletons
- Joseph Roth: Radetzkymarsch; Die Legende vom heiligen Trinker; Stationschef Fallmerayer; Short Stories
- Bertolt Brecht: Mutter Courage und ihre Kinder; Leben des Galilei; Kalendergeschichten (selections); Poems
- Erich Kästner: Gedichte
- Anna Seghers: Das siebte Kreuz; Der Ausflug der toten Mädchen
- Ödön von Horváth: Kasimir und Karoline
- Peter Huchel: Poems
- Wolfgang Koeppen: Tauben im Gras
- Günter Eich: Poems
- Max Frisch: Diary (excerpts); Homo faber; Biedermann und die Brandstifter; Montauk
- Arno Schmidt: Die Umsiedler; Seelandschaft mit Pocahontas
- Peter Weiss: Marat/Sade
- Heinrich Böll: Der Mann mit den Messern; Wanderer, kommst du nach Spa...; Doktor Murkes gesammeltes Schweigen
- Paul Celan: Poems
- Friedrich Dürrenmatt: Die Panne
- Ernst Jandl: Poems
- Ingeborg Bachmann: Poems
- Günter Grass: Die Blechtrommel (excerpts); Cat and Mouse
- Peter Rühmkorf: Poems
- Hans Magnus Enzensberger: Poems
- Thomas Bernhard: Holzfällen; Wittgensteins Neffe – Eine Freundschaft
- Uwe Johnson: Mutmassungen über Jakob (excerpts)
- Sarah Kirsch: Poems
- Wolf Biermann: Poems
- Jurek Becker: Jacob the Liar
- Robert Gernhardt: Poems

== Novels ==
Author	Title	Author	Title
Johann Wolfgang von Goethe	Die Leiden des jungen Werthers	Robert Musil	Die Verwirrungen des Zöglings Törleß
Johann Wolfgang von Goethe	Die Wahlverwandtschaften	Franz Kafka	Der Prozeß
E. T. A. Hoffmann	Die Elixiere des Teufels	Alfred Döblin	Berlin Alexanderplatz
Gottfried Keller	Der grüne Heinrich	Joseph Roth	Radetzkymarsch
Theodor Fontane	Frau Jenny Treibel	Anna Seghers	Das siebte Kreuz
Theodor Fontane	Effi Briest	Heimito von Doderer	Die Strudlhofstiege
Thomas Mann	Buddenbrooks	Wolfgang Koeppen	Tauben im Gras
Thomas Mann	Der Zauberberg	Günter Grass	Die Blechtrommel
Heinrich Mann	Professor Unrat	Max Frisch	Montauk
Hermann Hesse	Unterm Rad	Thomas Bernhard	Holzfällen

== Stories ==
180 Novellas, short Stories, Parables, Fairy Tales, Legends, and Kalendergeschichte.

== Essays ==
The series of "essays" gave Reich-Ranicki much "grief." Even the choice of the title "essays" was hotly debated. Reich-Ranicki included not just essays in a classic sense, but also a wide variety of critical works including criticism of film, literature, music reviews, theater reviews, essays, speeches, diaries, letters, ephemera, and aphorisms, spanning both fictional and nonfictional literature. The term "essayistic" was coined for this purpose.

The "essay" canon contains 255 articles from 166 authors covering a wide variety of subject matter. It is divided into five parts:

- from Martin Luther to Arthur Schopenhauer (i.e. 16th–mid-19th centuries)
- from Leopold von Ranke to Rosa Luxemburg (mid-19th to early 20th centuries)
- from Heinrich Mann to Joseph Roth (early 20th century)
- from Bertold Brecht to Golo Mann (mid-20th century)
- from Max Frisch to Durs Grünbein (late 20th and early 21st centuries)

== Adaptations ==
In 2015, the author Hannes Bajohr published his "novel" Durchschnitt (Average) based on Reich-Ranicki's novel canon. For his book, he analyzed the texts of the twenty volume novel-box of the series, calculated their average sentence length (18 words), and, with the help of a computer script, generated a book that only contained these average sentences. He then sorted them alphabetically in chapters according to the letters of the alphabet.
