= Under the Pear Tree =

Novel by Theodor Fontane

Under the Pear Tree (German: Unterm Birnbaum) is a novella written in 1885 by Theodor Fontane. It is a crime story in which the reader knows from the outset who commits a murder and why. While the details of the murder event itself remain mysterious, the narrative focuses on what others think happened, how a small town's community opinion vacillates over time, and how the community's opinions affect the perpetrators. The reader cannot easily predict whether the murderers will ever be caught.

== Inspiration ==
As with some other of Fontane's works such as Effi Briest and Beyond Recall, the plot was patterned roughly around a real event reported years before the novella was written and that Fontane had read about. The majority of the novel consists of richly nuanced conversations among the town's denizens about the married couple at the center of the controversy.

== Adaptations for audio and film ==
In Germany, this crime story has been made into an audio drama more than half a dozen times, and it has been adapted for film or television at least five times:

- 1945: Der stumme Gast, Verfilmung der UFA von Harald Braun mit René Deltgen als Matthias (entspricht Abel) und Gisela Uhlen als Lisa (entspricht Ursel)
- 1963: Unterm Birnbaum, Fernseh-Verfilmung des WDR von Gerhard Klingenberg mit Heinz Reincke als Abel und Eva Lissa als Ursel
- 1964: Unterm Birnbaum, Fernseh-Verfilmung der ARD von Mark Lawton mit Paul Esser als Abel und Agnes Fink als Ursel
- 1973: Unterm Birnbaum, Verfilmung der DEFA von Ralf Kirsten mit Erik S. Klein als Abel und Angelika Domröse als Ursula
- 2019: Unterm Birnbaum, Fernseh-Verfilmung für das ZDF, Regie Uli Edel, Drehbuch Léonie-Claire Breinersdorfer, mit Fritz Karl als Abel und Julia Koschitz als Ursel

== English translation ==
For English readers, there has been a translation ("Under the Pear Tree"), translated by Patricia Tiney, available since 2010.
