= Untermensch =

German word meaning "subhuman", used by the Nazi Party

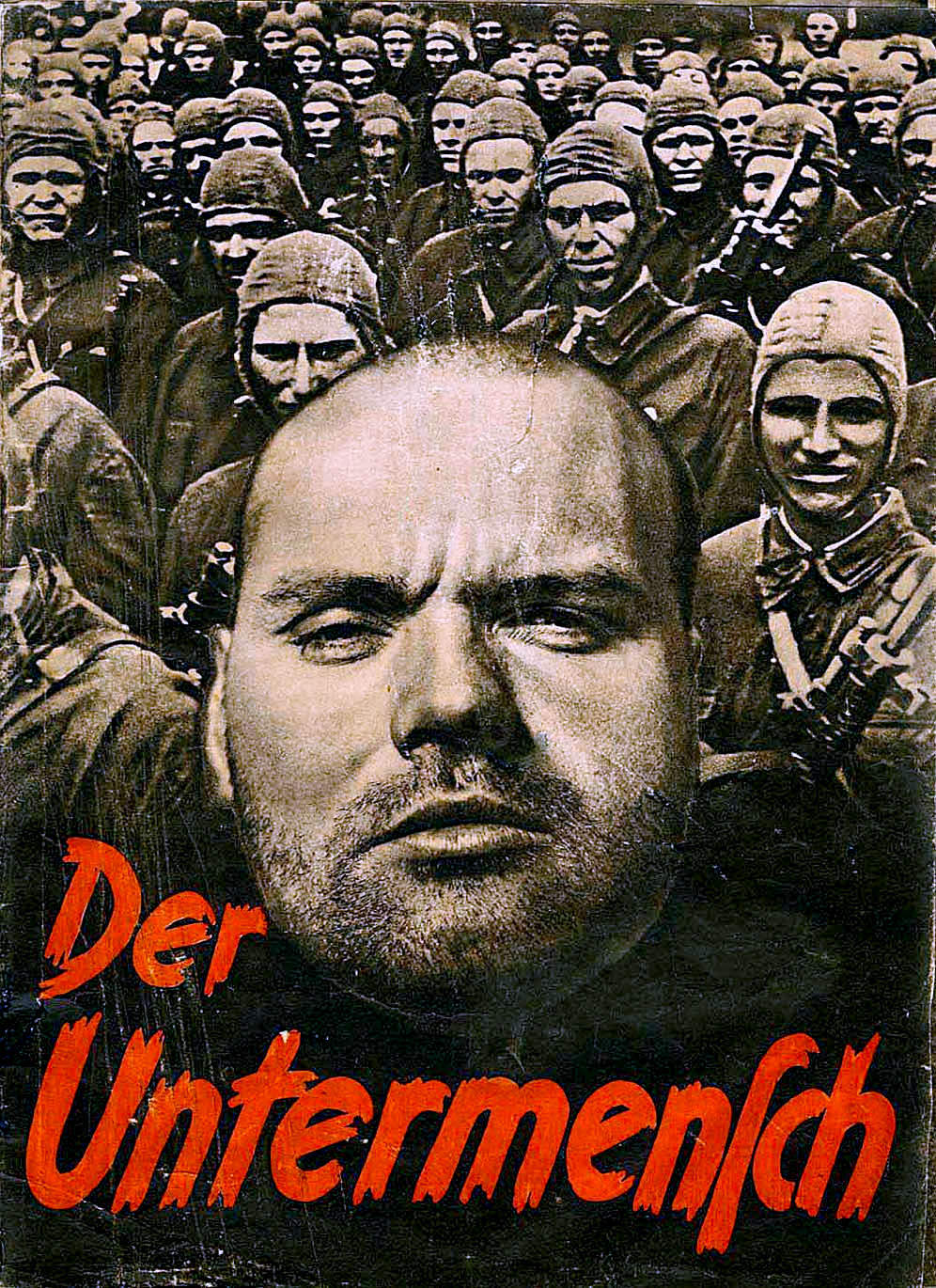
Cover of the Nazi propaganda brochure "Der Untermensch" ("The Subhuman"), 1942. The SS booklet depicted the natives of the Soviet Union as "subhumans".

Untermensch (German pronunciation: [ˈʔʊntɐˌmɛnʃ]; plural: Untermenschen) is a German-language word literally meaning 'underhuman' or 'subhuman', which was extensively used by Germany's Nazi Party to refer to their opponents and non-Aryan people they deemed as inferior. It was mainly used against "the masses from the East", that is Jews, Roma, and Slavs (mainly ethnic Poles, Belarusians, Ukrainians, Russians and Serbs).

The term was also applied to "Mischling" (persons of mixed "Aryan" and non-Aryan ancestry) and black people. The physically and mentally disabled, homosexuals, transgender, political dissidents and—on rare instances—POWs from Western Allied armies, were also considered Untermenschen and were to be exterminated in the Holocaust. According to the Generalplan Ost, the Slavic population of East-Central Europe was to be reduced in part through mass murder in the Holocaust for Lebensraum, with a significant number expelled farther east to Siberia and used as forced labour in the Reich. These concepts were an important part of the Nazi racial policy.

== Etymology ==
The term "under man" was introduced by the American author and Ku Klux Klan member Lothrop Stoddard in his 1922 book The Revolt Against Civilization: The Menace of the Under-man. Stoddard applies the term to those whom he considers unable to flourish in civilization due to their inferior heredity ("The word inferior has, however, been so often employed as a synonym for degenerate that it tends to produce confusion of thought, and to avoid this I have coined a term which seems to describe collectively all those kinds of persons whom I have just discussed. This term is The Under-Man—the man who measures under the standards of capacity and adaptability imposed by the social order in which he lives". (p. 23)). Therefore, the term has no racial connotations. Indeed, in his book Stoddard maintains that without eugenics any and all civilizations—irrespective of race, time and geography—have been, are and inevitably will be prone to gradual degradation. The Nazi Party later used the term in propaganda, possibly influenced in part from the title of the book's German edition Der Kulturumsturz: Die Drohung des Untermenschen (1925).

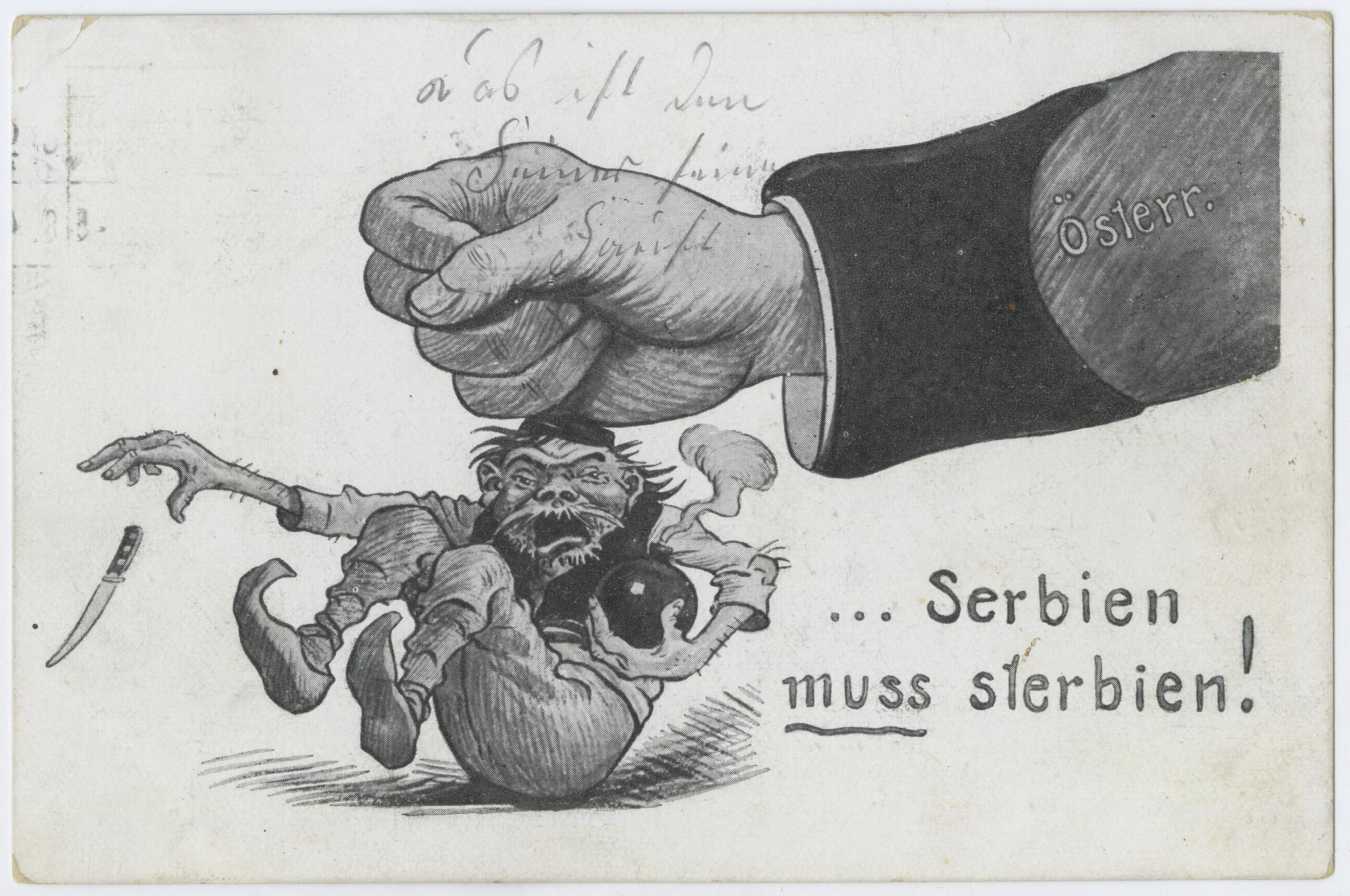
Austro-Hungarian postcard made in 1914 which features the rhyming slogan "Serbia must die!" Such images were representative of the social attitudes underlying the concept of untermensch.

The German word Untermensch had been used in earlier periods, but it had not been used in a racial sense; for example, it was used in the 1899 novel Der Stechlin by Theodor Fontane. Since most writers who employed the term did not address the question of when and how the word entered the German language, in English, Untermensch is usually translated as "subhuman". The leading Nazi who attributed the concept of the East-European "under man" to Stoddard was Alfred Rosenberg who, referring to communists of Soviet Russia, wrote in his Der Mythus des zwanzigsten Jahrhunderts (1930) that "this is the kind of human being that Lothrop Stoddard has called the 'under man.'" ["...den Lothrop Stoddard als 'Untermenschen' bezeichnete."] Despite Nazi official support for The Myth of the Twentieth Century and Rosenberg's prominent role in promoting Nazi ideology, Adolf Hitler declared that it was not to be considered the official ideology of the Nazi Party, and he privately described the book as "mysticism" and "nonsense". Albert Speer claimed that Goebbels mocked Alfred Rosenberg. Goebbels also called the book a "philosophical belch".

It is possible that Stoddard constructed his "under man" as an opposite of Friedrich Nietzsche's Übermensch (superman) concept. Stoddard does not explicitly say this, but he critically refers to the "superman" idea at the end of his book (p. 262). Wordplays with Nietzsche's term seem to have been used repeatedly as early as the 19th century and, due to the German linguistic trait of being able to combine prefixes and roots almost at will in order to create new words, this development can be considered logical. For instance, German author Theodor Fontane contrasts the Übermensch/Untermensch word pair in chapter 33 of his novel Der Stechlin. Nietzsche used the term Untermensch at least once in contrast to Übermensch in Die fröhliche Wissenschaft (1882). Earlier examples of Untermensch include Romanticist Jean Paul using the term in his novel Hesperus (1795) in reference to an Orangutan (Chapter "8. Hundposttag").

== Nazi propaganda ==
In a speech which he delivered to the Bavarian regional parliament in 1927, the Nazi Party propagandist Julius Streicher, publisher of Der Stürmer, used the term Untermensch referring to the communists of the German Bavarian Soviet Republic:

It happened at the time of the [Bavarian] Soviet Republic: When the unleashed subhumans rambled murdering through the streets, the deputies hid behind a chimney in the Bavarian parliament.

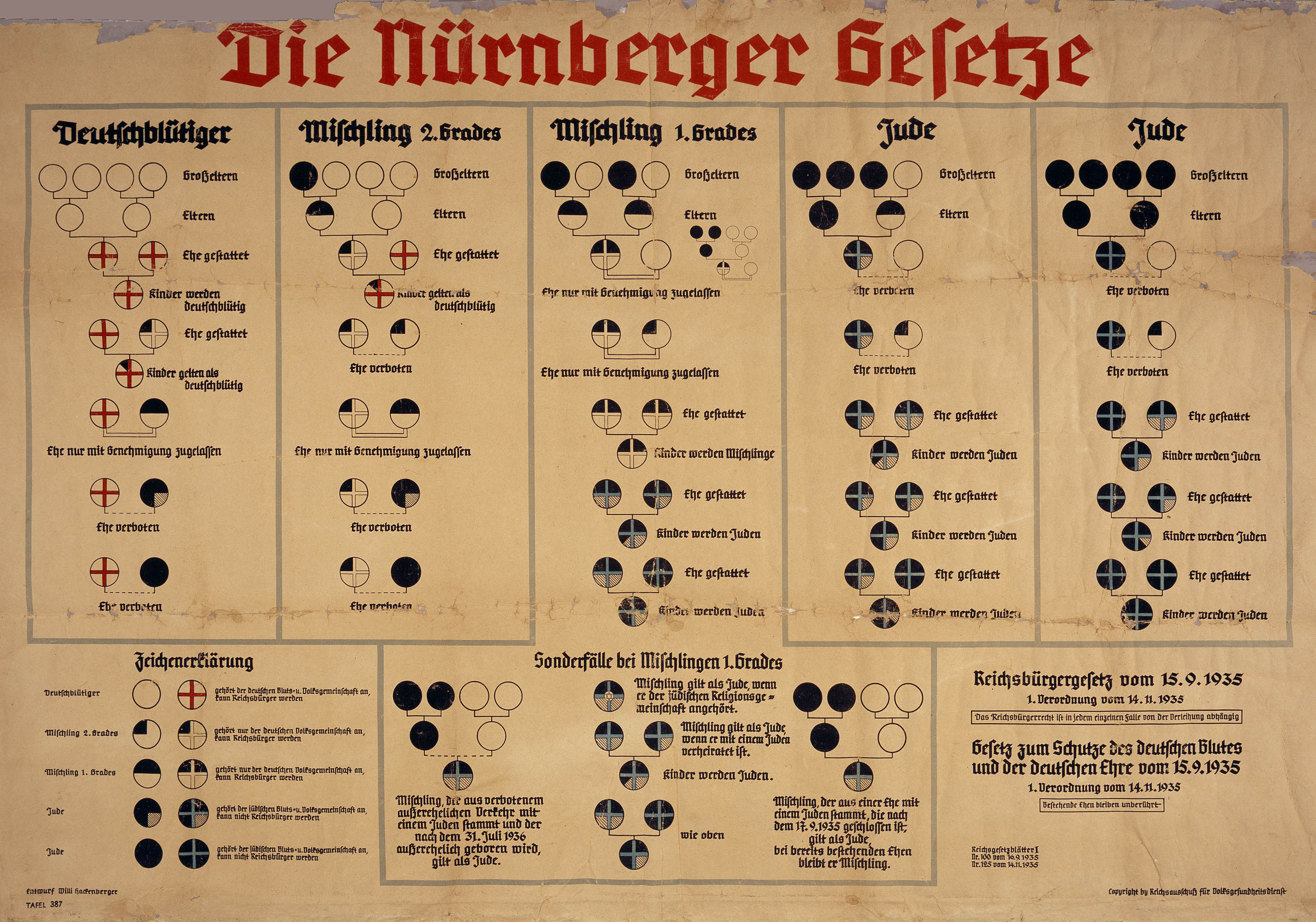
A chart used to illustrate the Nazi Nuremberg Laws introduced in 1935

The Nazi party and thereafter also the regime (1933–1945) repeatedly used the term Untermensch in writings and speeches which they directed against the Jews. In the pamphlet "The SS as an Anti-Bolshevist Fighting Organization", published in 1936, Himmler wrote:

We shall take care that never again in Germany, the heart of Europe, will the Jewish-Bolshevik revolution of subhumans be able to be kindled either from within or through emissaries from without.

In his speech "Weltgefahr des Bolschewismus" ("World danger of Bolshevism") in 1936, Joseph Goebbels said that "subhumans exist in every people as a leavening agent". At the 1935 Nazi party congress rally at Nuremberg, Goebbels also declared that, “Bolshevism is the declaration of war by Jewish-led international subhumans against culture itself."

The most notorious example of the usage of the term Untermensch by the Nazis is a Schutzstaffel (SS) brochure entitled "Der Untermensch", distributed by the Reich Security Main Office under the directives of Heinrich Himmler. Published in 1942 after the start of Operation Barbarossa, it is around 50 pages long and consists, for the most part, of photos portraying the natives of Eastern Europe in an extremely negative way. Nearly four million copies of the pamphlet were printed in the German language and distributed across German-occupied territories. The contents of the "Der Untermensch" brochure extensively emphasized Himmler's racist demonization of Russians as "bestial untermenschen" and Jews as "the decisive leader of untermenschen". It was translated into Greek, French, Dutch, Danish, Bulgarian, Hungarian, Czech and seven other languages. It gives the following definition of an Untermensch:

The subhuman is a biological creature, crafted by nature, which has hands, legs, eyes and mouth, even the semblance of a brain. Nevertheless, this terrible creature is only a partial human being. Although it has features similar to a human, the subhuman is lower on the spiritual and psychological scale than any animal. Inside this being is a cruel chaos of wild, unrestrained passions, nameless desire for destruction, the most primitive desires, the most naked meanness.

== Spanish Falangism ==
In Spain, in addition to the term underman, the terms subhuman and degenerate are frequent in speeches and articles, especially from the 1930s. These are words used naturally in the newspapers, without explanations of the specific meaning, so it can be deduced that they were general knowledge. They are terms that increase in intensity during the October Events, and during the civil war.

As the civil war approaches or takes place, there is a divergence in the meaning of subhuman, on the rebel side it acquires a racial/eugenic meaning, beside ideologic, while on the republican side it is more of a cultural type.

Once the war was won by the rebel side, Francoism, similar to Nazi Germany (and Soviet Russia as well), promoted the idea of creating a new man, which led to the brutal repression of the Spanish population. Gonzalo de Aguilera, the press officer for the Nationalist faction during the Spanish Civil War, made the following classicidal statements to journalist John T. Whitaker:

"We have to kill, kill, you know? They are like animals, you know, and we cannot expect them to get rid of the virus of Bolshevism. After all, rats and lice are the carriers of the plague. Now I hope you understand what we mean by the regeneration of Spain... Our programme consists... of exterminating one third of the male population of Spain. That would cleanse the country and get rid of the proletariat. And it is also economically convenient. There will be no more unemployment in Spain, do you understand?"

== Policies of Nazi Germany ==
When faced with increasing military manpower shortages, the Nazi regime used soldiers from some Slavic countries, firstly from the Reich's allies Croatia and Slovakia as well as within occupied territories. The concept of the Slavs in particular being Untermenschen served the Nazis' political goals; it was used to justify their expansionist policy and especially their aggression against Poland and the Soviet Union in order to achieve Lebensraum, particularly in Ukraine. Early plans of the Nazi officials (summarized as Generalplan Ost) envisioned the ethnic cleansing and extermination of no fewer than 50 million people, who were not considered fit for Germanization, from territories it wanted to conquer in Europe. Nazi planners considered Ukraine's chernozem ("black earth") soil as a particularly desirable zone for colonization.

=== Eastern Europe ===
During the war, Nazi propaganda instructed Wehrmacht officers to tell their soldiers to target people whom they considered "Jewish Bolshevik subhumans". In addition, Nazi Germany conducted its warfare against the Soviet Union as a racial war targeting Jews, Romanis, Slavs, and various indigenous inhabitants of Eastern Europe who were categorized as "untermenschen" in the Nazi ideology. Nazis viewed Russians as animalistic sub-humans who were incapable of mounting any form of collective resistance against a German invasion. Nazi anti-Slavism was also tied to the Judeo-Bolshevik conspiracy theory; which claimed that Slavs were inferior people controlled by Jews as pawns in their plots against Aryans.

Prior to the launch of Operation Barbarossa, the Wehrmacht's High Command began issuing orders to enable German soldiers to indiscriminately target the inhabitants of Eastern Europe and unleash systematic violence against entire populations. German Army was instructed to grant carte blanche to the anti-Jewish massacres carried out by the Einsatzgruppen death squads in German-occupied territories. “Guidelines for the Conduct of the Troops in Russia” issued by the German High Command on 19 May 1941, ordered German troops to target Jews, partisans, Bolsheviks, etc. and described the war in Eastern Europe as a "historic task to liberate the German people once forever from the Asiatic-Jewish danger". In 1943 Himmler issued a secret order for the destruction of the Warsaw Ghetto in order to eliminate the "living space" of 500,000 Untermenschen, unsuitable for the Germans.

== Sub-human types ==
The Nazis divided the people who they considered the sub-humans into different types; they placed priority on the extermination of the Jews, and Roma, and the exploitation of others as slaves.

Historian Robert Jan van Pelt writes that for the Nazis, "it was only a small step to a rhetoric pitting the European Mensch against the Soviet Untermensch, which had come to mean a Russian in the clutches of Judeo-Bolshevism."

The Untermensch concept included Jews, Roma and Sinti (Gypsies), and Slavic peoples such as Poles, Ukrainians, and Russians. Slavs were regarded as Untermenschen, barely fit for exploitation as slaves. Hitler and Goebbels compared them to the "rabbit family" or to "stolid animals" that were "idle" and "disorganized" and spread like a "wave of filth". However, some among the Slavs who happened to have Nordic racial features were deemed to have distant Germanic descent which meant partially "Aryan" origin, and if under 10 years old, they were to be Germanized (see: kidnapping of children by Nazi Germany).

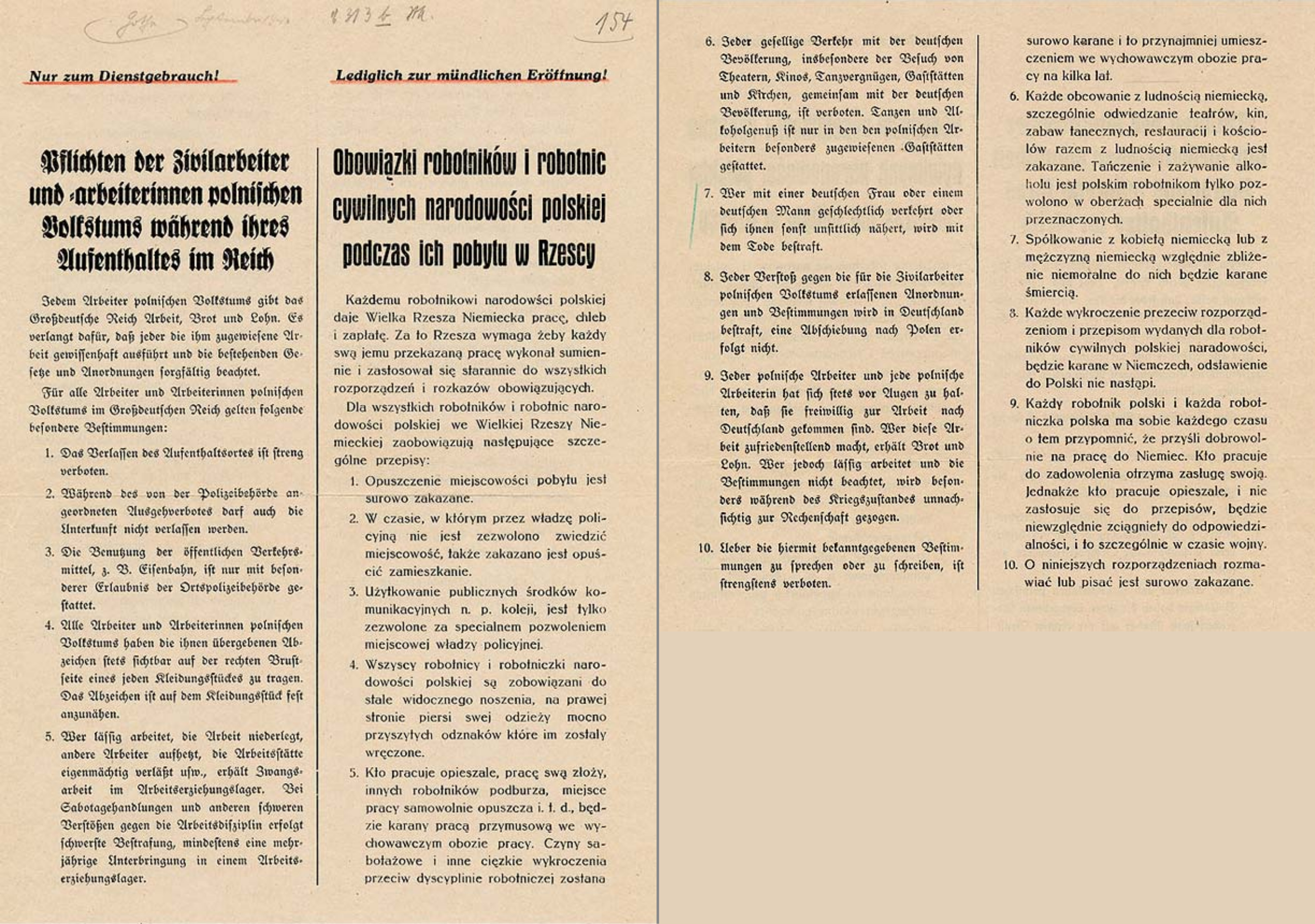
A 1940 poster listing the obligations imposed on Polish workers in Germany under the Polish decrees, including the death penalty for sexual relations with a German.

The Nazis were utterly contemptuous of the Slavs, as even prior to World War II, Slavs – particularly the Poles – were deemed to be inferior to Germans and other Aryans. After Adolf Hitler gained political power in Germany, the concept of non-Aryan "sub-human slave-material" was developed and started to be used also towards other Slavic peoples. Poles were at the bottom of the Slavic "racial hierarchy" established by the Nazis. Soon after the Molotov–Ribbentrop Pact expired, Russians also started to be seen as "subhumans". Similarly, Belarusians, Czechs, Slovaks, and Ukrainians were considered to be inferior. Nonetheless, there were Slavs such as Bosniaks, Bulgarians, and Croats who collaborated with Nazi Germany that were still being perceived as not racially "pure" enough to reach the status of Germanic peoples, yet they were eventually considered ethnically better than other Slavs, mostly due to theories about these nations having a minimal amount of Slavic genes and considerable admixtures of Germanic and Turkic blood.

In order to forge a strategic alliance with the Independent State of Croatia—a puppet state created after the invasion of Yugoslavia and the Kingdom of Bulgaria, the Nazis deviated from a strict interpretation of their racial ideology, and Croats were officially described as "more Germanic than Slav", a notion supported by Croatia's fascist (Ustashe) dictator Ante Pavelić who maintained that the "Croats were descendants of the ancient Goths" and "had the Panslav idea forced upon them as something artificial". Hitler also deemed the Bulgarians to be "Turkoman" in origin.

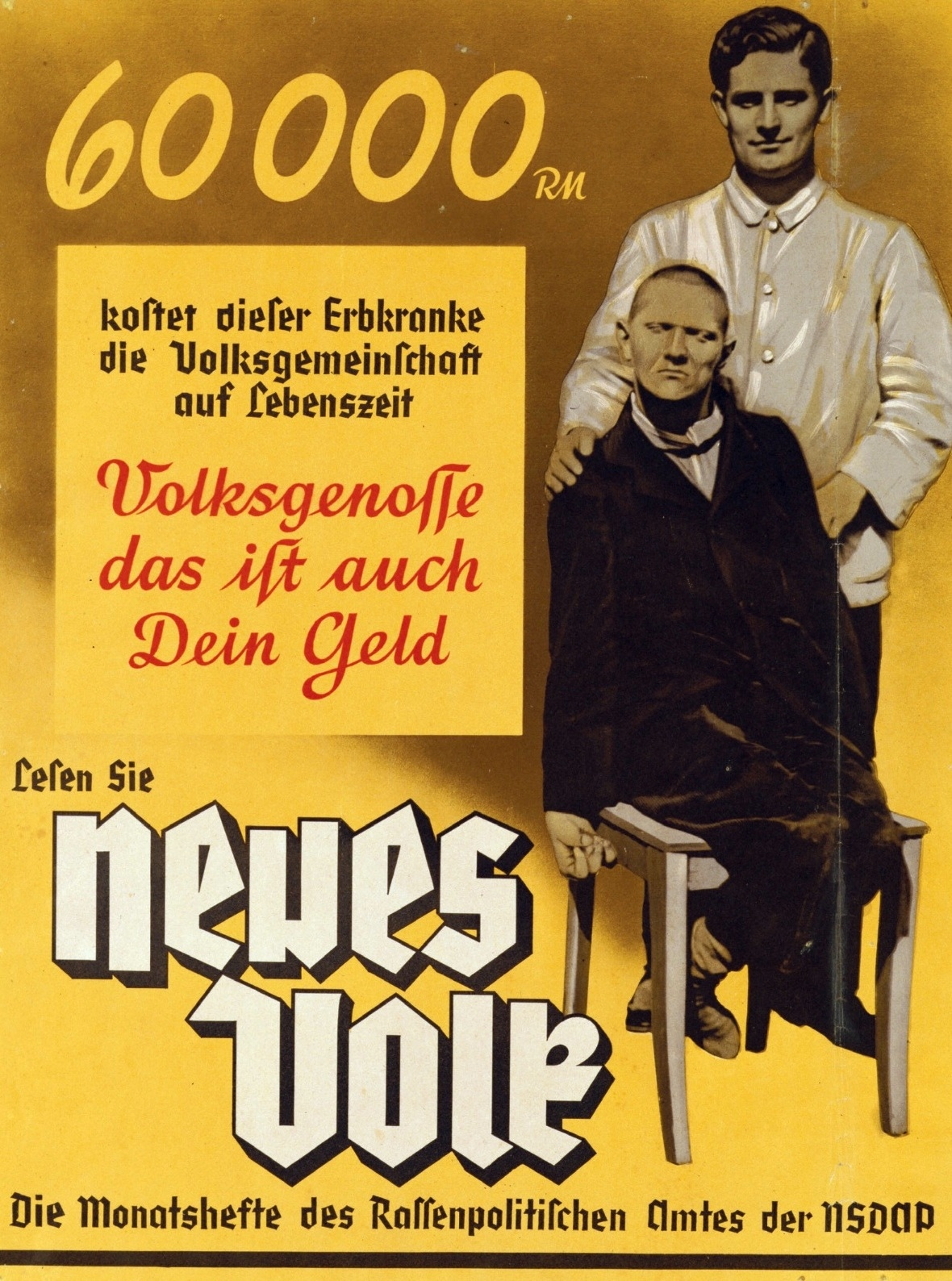
This poster (from around 1938) reads: "60,000 Reichsmark is what this person suffering from a hereditary defect costs the People's community during his lifetime. Fellow citizen, that is your money too. Read the Neues Volk, the monthly magazine of the Office of Racial Policy of the NSDAP."

While the Nazis were inconsistent in the implementation of their policy – for instance, mostly implementing the Final Solution while also implementing Generalplan Ost – the democidal death toll was in the range of tens of millions of victims. It is related to the concept of "life unworthy of life", a more specific term which originally referred to the severely disabled who were involuntarily euthanised in Aktion T4, and was eventually applied to the extermination of the Jews. That policy of euthanasia started officially on 1 September 1939 when Hitler signed an edict to the effect, and carbon monoxide was first used to murder disabled patients. The same gas was used in the death camps such as Treblinka, although they used engine exhaust gases to achieve the same end. In directive No. 1306 by Reich Ministry of Public Enlightenment and Propaganda from 24 October 1939, the term "Untermensch" is used in reference to Polish ethnicity and culture, as follows:

It must become clear to everybody in Germany, even to the last milkmaid, that Polishness is equal to subhumanity. Poles, Jews and Gypsies are on the same inferior level. This must be clearly outlined [...] until every citizen of Germany has it encoded in his subconsciousness that every Pole, whether a farm worker or intellectual, should be treated like vermin.

Biology classes in Nazi-era Germany schools taught about differences between the race of Nordic German "Übermenschen" and "ignoble" Jewish and Slavic "subhumans". The view that Slavs were subhuman was widespread among the German masses, and chiefly applied to the Poles. It continued to find support after the war.

== See also ==
- Antisemitism
- Anti-Romani sentiment
- Anti-Slavic sentiment
- Aryan race
- Master race
- Nazi racial theories
