= Breitbach =

Breitbach may refer to:

- Breitbach (Main), a river of Bavaria, Germany, tributary of the Main
- Breitbach's Country Dining, a restaurant and bar in Balltown, Iowa, United States

== People with that surname ==
- Carl Breitbach (1833–1904), German painter
- Greg Breitbach (born c. 1971), American former college football coach
- Joseph Breitbach (1903–1980), German-French playwright, novelist and journalist
- Michael Breitbach (born 1956), Iowa State Senator
