= Before the Storm (Fontane novel) =

1878 novel by Theodor Fontane

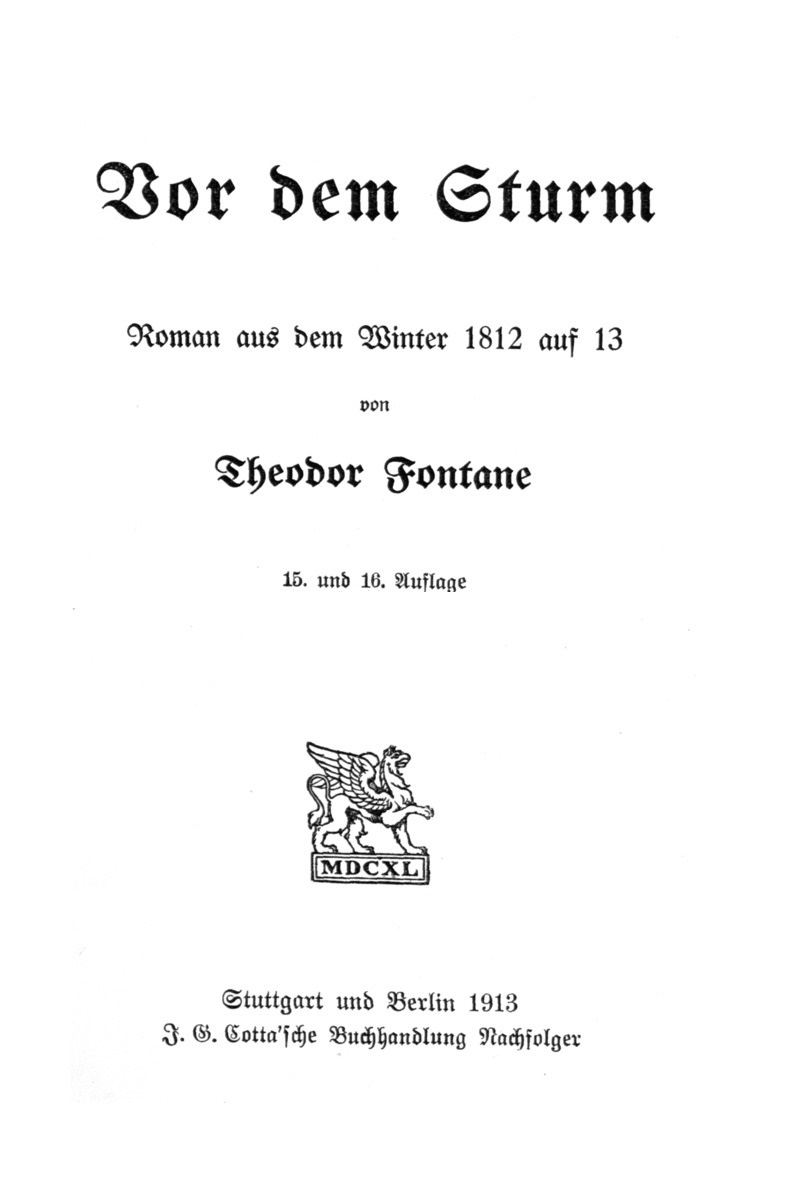
- Title page of an edition from 1913
- Author: Theodor Fontane
- Original title: Vor dem Sturm
- Translator: R. J. Hollingdale
- Language: German
- Publisher: Daheim; Wilhelm Hertz
- Publication date: 5 January–21 September 1878 (serial); October 1878 (book)
- Publication place: Germany
- English publication date: 1985
- Pages: 911

Before the Storm: A Novel of the Winter of 1812–13 (German: Vor dem Sturm. Roman aus dem Winter 1812 auf 13) is the 1878 debut novel of the German writer Theodor Fontane.

== Background ==
Fontane was a well-known poet and famous for his travel writings in Wanderungen durch die Mark Brandenburg, and had been a full-time writer from the age of 30. Later in life he turned to writing novels of which Before the Storm was the first, published when he was 58. Fontane described the general subject of the novel as "the entry of a great idea, of a great moment into an essentially very simple class and condition of men". He wrote that he wanted to capture "the great emotion" among Prussians fighting back against Napoleon and simultaneously "not to be too disturbing, or even particularly gripping".

== Plot ==
The novel is set in the Kingdom of Prussia in 1812 and 1813 and depicts the reactions to the Napoleonic Wars, providing a portrayal of the country and the historical situation in Europe.

== Publication ==
Before the Storm was serialised in the weekly magazine Daheim from 5 January to 21 September 1878. Wilhelm Hertz in Berlin published it as a book in four volumes in October the same year. Oxford University Press published R. J. Hollingdale's English translation in 1985.

== Adaptation ==
It was the basis for ARD's television serial Vor dem Sturm, broadcast in six episodes in May and June 1984.
