= The False Step =

1939 film

- German film poster
- German: Der Schritt vom Wege
- Directed by: Gustaf Gründgens
- Written by: Georg C. Klaren; Eckart von Naso
- Based on: Effi Briest by Theodor Fontane
- Produced by: Gustaf Gründgens; Eduard Kubat
- Starring: Marianne Hoppe; Karl Ludwig Diehl; Paul Hartmann; Max Gülstorff
- Cinematography: Ewald Daub
- Edited by: Johanna Schmidt
- Music by: Mark Lothar
- Production company: Terra Film
- Distributed by: Terra Film
- Release date: 9 February 1939
- Running time: 101 minutes
- Country: Nazi Germany
- Language: German

The False Step or The Step off the Path (German: Der Schritt vom Wege) is a 1939 German historical drama film directed by Gustaf Gründgens and starring Marianne Hoppe, Karl Ludwig Diehl and Paul Hartmann. It is an adaptation of Theodor Fontane's 1896 novel Effi Briest.

== Cast ==
- Marianne Hoppe as Effi Briest
- Karl Ludwig Diehl as Baron von Instetten
- Paul Hartmann as Major a.D. von Crampas
- Max Gülstorff as Dr. Alonzo Gieshübler
- Paul Bildt as Herr von Briest
- Käthe Haack as Luise von Briest
- Hans Leibelt as Ministerialrat Wüllersdorf
- Elisabeth Flickenschildt as Marietta Tripelli
- Gisela von Collande as Afra
- Renée Stobrawa as Roswitha
- Erich Dunskus as Kruse
- Flora Berthold as Hulda
- Ursula Voß as Herta
- Ursula Friese as Berta
- Margarete Schön as Frau von Padden
- Jac Diehl as guest at the festival
- Alfred Karen as guest at Tripellis Gesangsvortrag
- Alexander Kökert as Besucher beim Landrat
- Bert Schmidt-Moris as Page at the spa hotel
- Tina Schneider as Doddy Grützmacher
- Babsi Schultz-Reckewell as Annie Briest
- Maria Seidler as Frau Konsul Grützmacher
