= Adultery in literature =

The theme of adultery has been used in a wide range of literature through the ages, and has served as a theme for some notable works such as Anna Karenina and Madame Bovary. As a theme it brings intense emotions into the foreground, and has consequences for all concerned. It also automatically brings its own conflict, between the people concerned and between sexual desires and a sense of loyalty.

As marriage and family are often regarded as basis of society, a story of adultery often shows the conflict between social pressure and individual struggle for happiness.

According to the American author Tom Perrotta, the novel of adultery is one of the leading 19th century literary traditions in Europe and in the United States. He states that these novels often feature women whose unhappy marriages push them into seeking romance and illicit sex. The main topic of these novels is the rebel-woman who seeks salvation for her unhappy public love-life.

In the Bible, incidents of adultery are present almost from the start. The story of Abraham contains several incidents and serve as warnings or stories of sin and forgiveness. Abraham attempts to continue his blood line through his wife's maidservant, with consequences that continue through history. Jacob's family life is complicated with similar incidents.

The following works of literature have adultery and its consequences as one of their major themes. (M) and (F) stand for adulterer and adulteress respectively.

== Drama ==
- Edward Albee: Marriage Play (M, ?F)
- Samuel Beckett: Play (M)
- Alban Berg: Lulu (F)
- John Dryden: Marriage à la Mode'' (M, F)
- Euripides: Hippolytus (the suspicion of F)
- Simon Gray: Japes (F)
- William Somerset Maugham: The Circle (F), The Constant Wife (M, F)
- Arthur Miller: Broken Glass (F), The Crucible (M, F)
- Peter Nichols: Passion Play (M, F)
- Harold Pinter: The Homecoming (F)
- Racine: Phèdre (suspicion of F)
- William Shakespeare: The Tragedy of Othello, the Moor of Venice (no adulterers/esses, though the plot revolves around the perception of adultery); The Winter's Tale (the suspicion of adultery initiates the plot)
- Dmitri Shostakovich: Lady Macbeth of the Mtsensk District (F)
- Richard Strauss: Salome (M)
- Richard Wagner: Tristan und Isolde, based on the legend of Tristan and Iseult (F); Die Walküre (M, F)
- Hugh Whitemore: Disposing of the Body (M, F)
- The Who: Tommy (F)
- Tennessee Williams: Baby Doll (F)
- William Wycherley: The Country Wife (F)

== Fiction ==
- Leopoldo Alas: La Regenta (F)
- Kingsley Amis: That Uncertain Feeling (M, F)
- Machado de Assis: Dom Casmurro (F)
- Jane Austen: Mansfield Park (F)
- Malcolm Bradbury: The History Man (M, F)
- John Braine: The Jealous God (M, F)
- Anne Brontë: The Tenant of Wildfell Hall (M, F)
- Charlotte Brontë: Jane Eyre (M, F)
- James M. Cain: The Postman Always Rings Twice (F)
- Philippa Carr: The Adulteress (F)
- Geoffrey Chaucer: The Canterbury Tales (M, F)
- Kate Chopin: The Awakening (F)
- Paulo Coelho: Adultery (F)
- Albert Cohen: Belle du Seigneur (F)
- Ivy Compton-Burnett: A Heritage and Its History (F)
- Bret Easton Ellis: American Psycho (M, F)
- F. Scott Fitzgerald: The Great Gatsby (M, F); Tender Is the Night (M, F)
- Gustave Flaubert: Madame Bovary (F)
- Theodor Fontane: Effi Briest (F)
- Ford Madox Ford: The Good Soldier (M, F), Parade's End (M, F)
- C. S. Forester: Flying Colours, Lord Hornblower (M)
- John Galsworthy: The Forsyte Saga (M, F)
- Ellen Glasgow: Virginia (M)
- Graham Greene: The End of the Affair (F); The Heart of the Matter (M)
- Mark Haddon: A Spot of Bother (F)
- Thomas Hardy: The Return of the Native (M, F), Jude the Obscure (M, F)
- Josephine Hart: Damage (M)
- Nathaniel Hawthorne: The Scarlet Letter (F)
- Carl Hiaasen: Skinny Dip (M)
- Francis Iles: Malice Aforethought (M)
- John Irving: The World According to Garp (M, F)
- James Joyce: Ulysses (M, F)
- Milan Kundera: The Unbearable Lightness of Being (M)
- Pierre Choderlos de Laclos: Les Liaisons dangereuses (F)
- D. H. Lawrence: Lady Chatterley's Lover (F)
- David Lodge: Thinks ... (M)
- William Somerset Maugham: Liza of Lambeth (M), The Painted Veil (M, F), Theatre (F)
- Nicholas Mosley: Natalie Natalia (M)
- Iris Murdoch: A Severed Head (M, F)
- John O'Hara: Elizabeth Appleton (F)
- Michael Ondaatje: The English Patient (F)
- Boris Pasternak: Doctor Zhivago (M, F)
- Marcel Proust: In Search of Lost Time (M)
- Raymond Radiguet: Le Bal du Comte d'Orgel (F)
- Marquis de Sade: Philosophy in the Bedroom (M, F)
- Irwin Shaw: Lucy Crown (F)
- Rabindranath Tagore: The Home and the World (F)
- Leo Tolstoy: Anna Karenina (M, F)
- Anthony Trollope: Can You Forgive Her? (F), He Knew He Was Right (F)
- Scott Turow: Presumed Innocent (M)
- John Updike: Couples (M, F)
- Evelyn Waugh: A Handful of Dust (F), Brideshead Revisited (M, F)
- Fay Weldon: The Life and Loves of a She-Devil (M)
- Edith Wharton: The Age of Innocence (M, F)
- A. N. Wilson: Scandal (M, F)
- Ellen Wood: East Lynne (F)
- Richard Yates: Revolutionary Road (M, F)
- Émile Zola: Thérèse Raquin (F)
- Stefan Zweig: Confusion: The Private Papers of Privy Councillor R. Von D (M)

== Sources ==
- "Farewell, King John of Suburbia", New Statesman, 29 January 2009
- Hawthorne, Nathaniel. "Foreword". The Scarlet Letter, Foreword by Tom Perrotta, Penguin, 2015, pp. vii-x.
