= Hercules and the Nemean Lion (Klein) =

Sculpture by Max Klein in Berlin, Germany

- Herkules mit dem Nemeïschen Löwen (German)
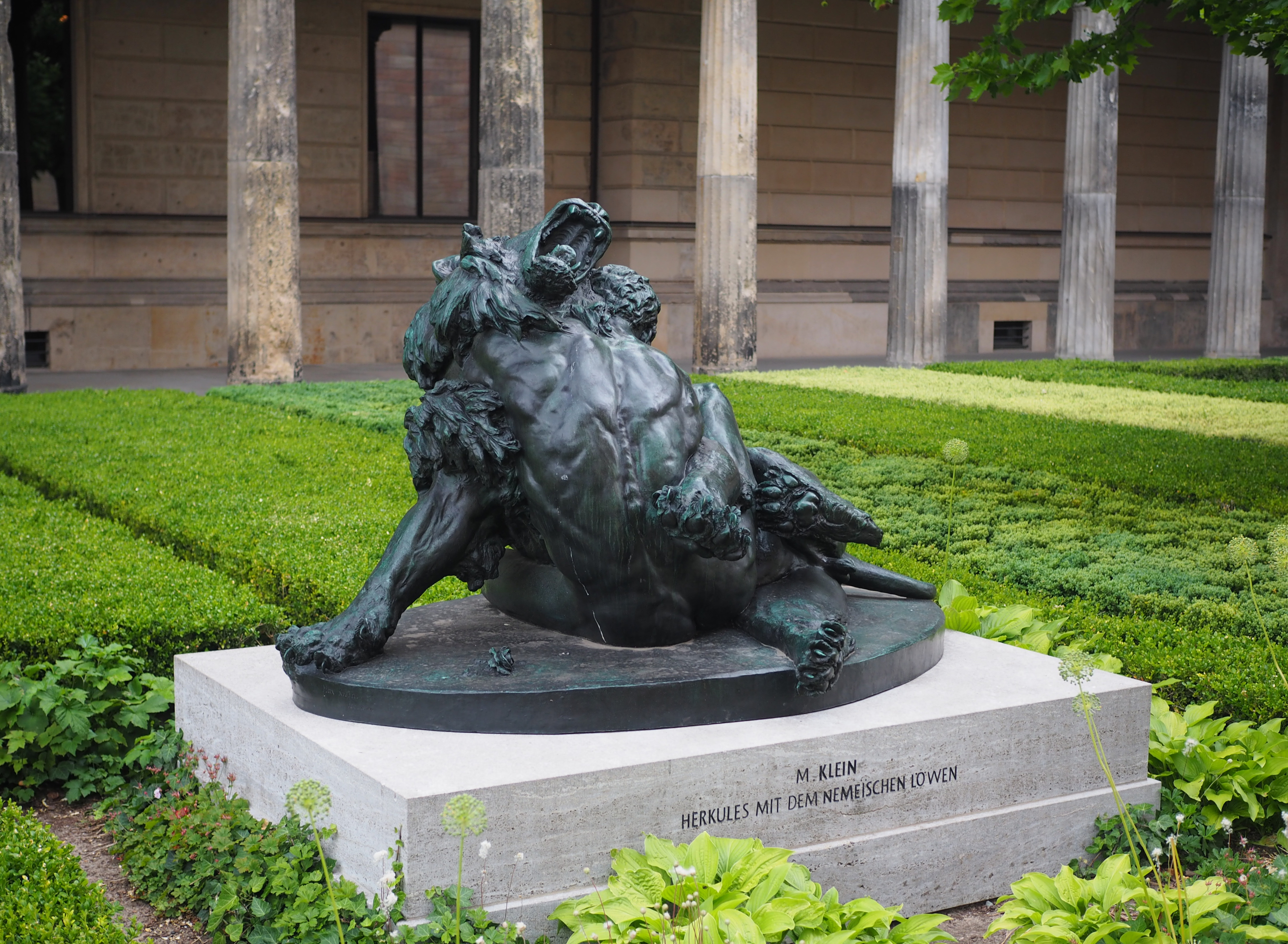
- The sculpture in 2015
- Location: Berlin, Germany; 52.52051°N 13.39794°E

Hercules and the Nemean Lion is a sculpture of Hercules fighting the Nemean lion by Max Klein, installed in the Kolonnadenhof outside the Alte Nationalgalerie in Berlin, Germany.
