= Statue of Theodor Fontane =

Statue in Berlin, Germany

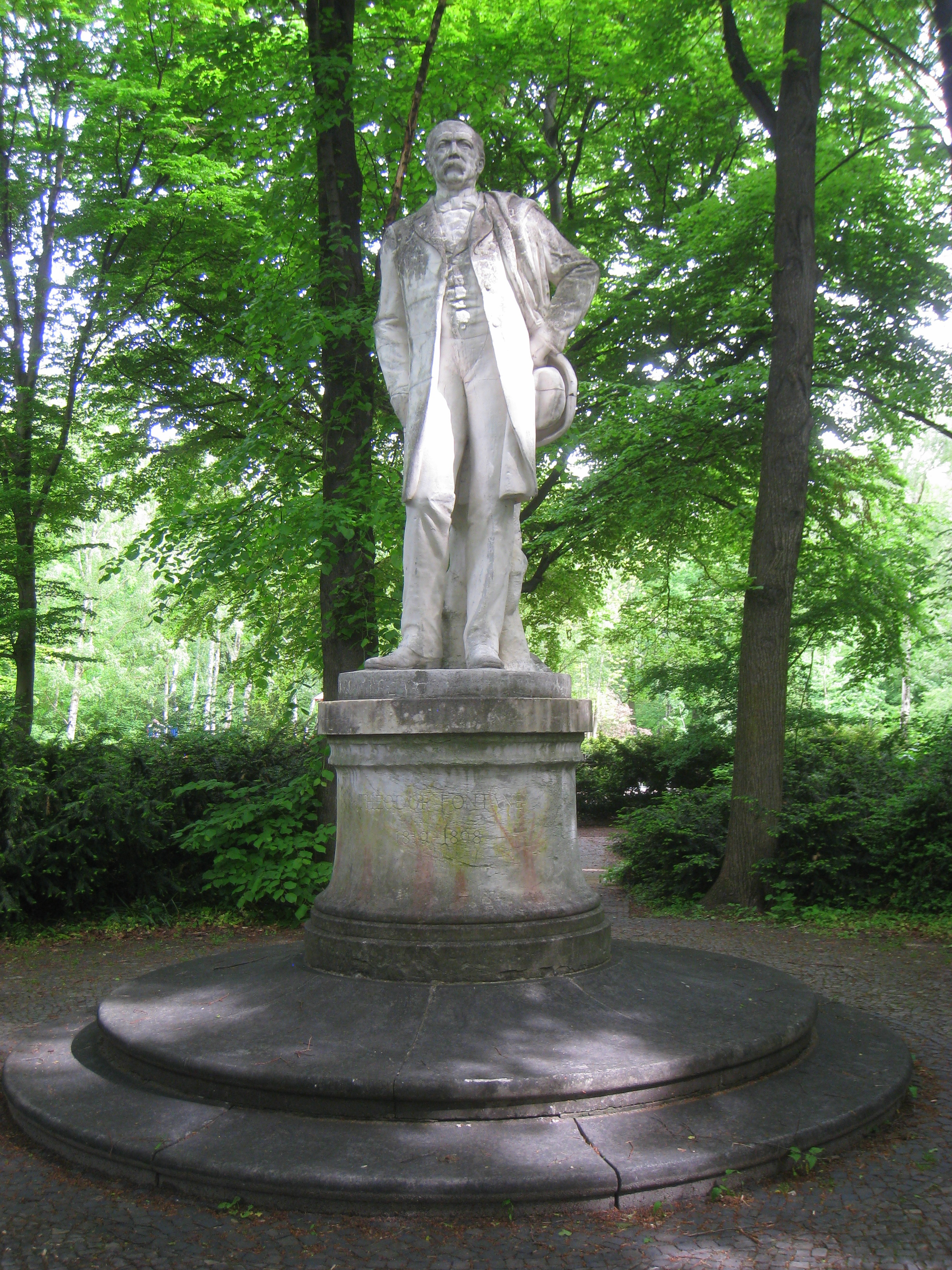
- The outdoor statue by Klein and Schaper in 2010
- Location: 52°30′35″N 13°20′54″E

A statue of Theodor Fontane by German sculptors Max Klein and Fritz Schaper is installed at Großer Tiergarten in Berlin, Germany.

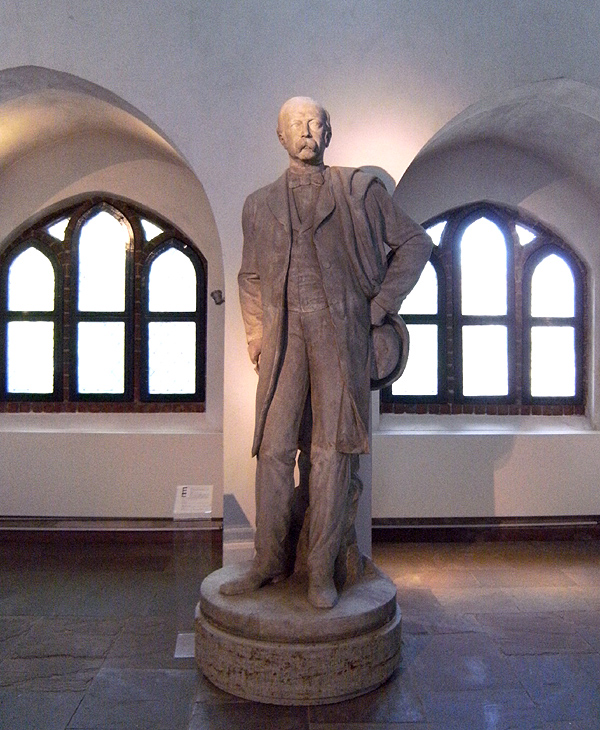
Model by Max Klein in Märkisches Museum in Berlin
