= Max Klein =

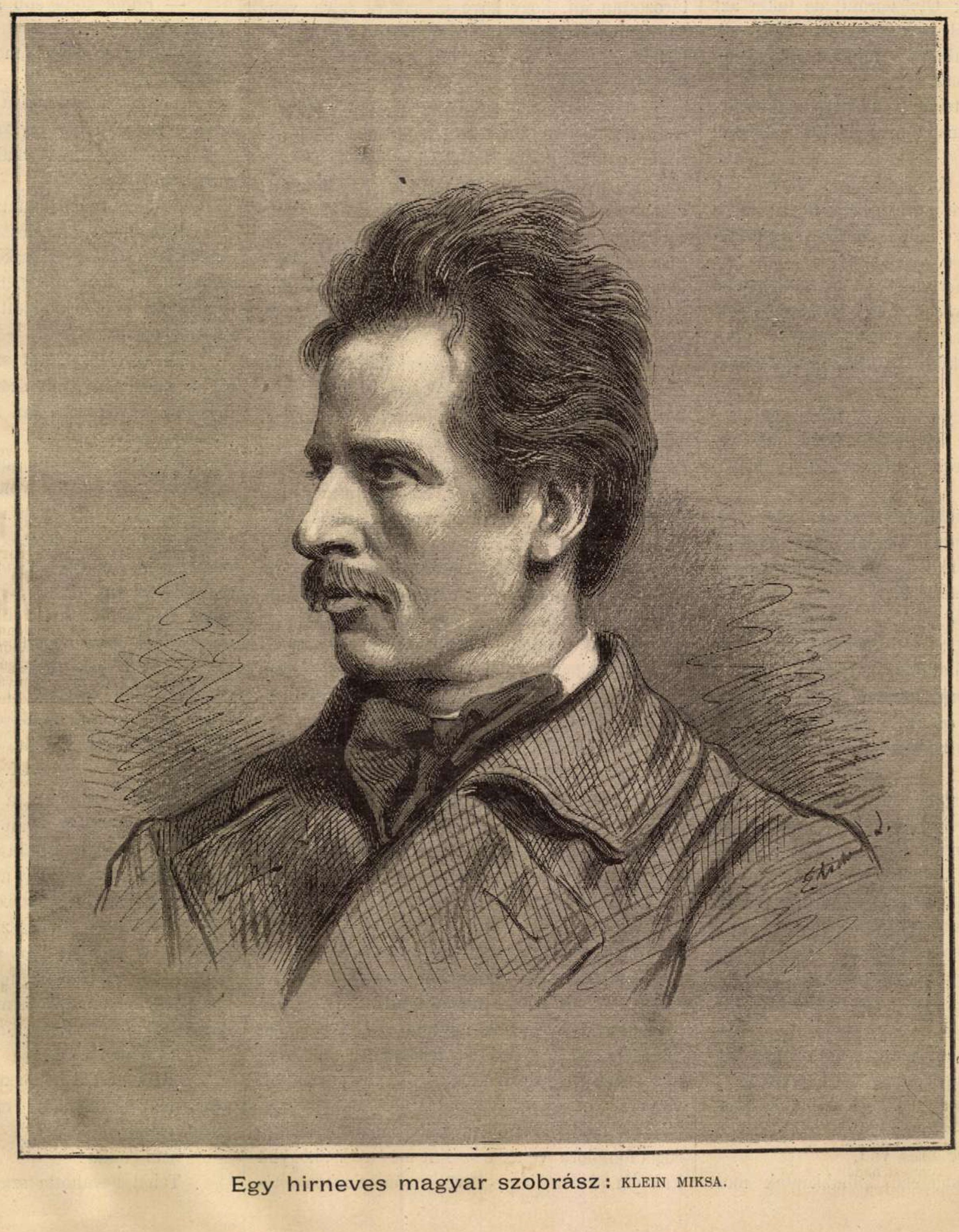
Max Klein; portrait by Lajos Elischer (1883)

Max Klein (27 January 1847, Gönc – 6 September 1908, Berlin) was a German sculptor and medallist, of Jewish ancestry.

== Life and work ==
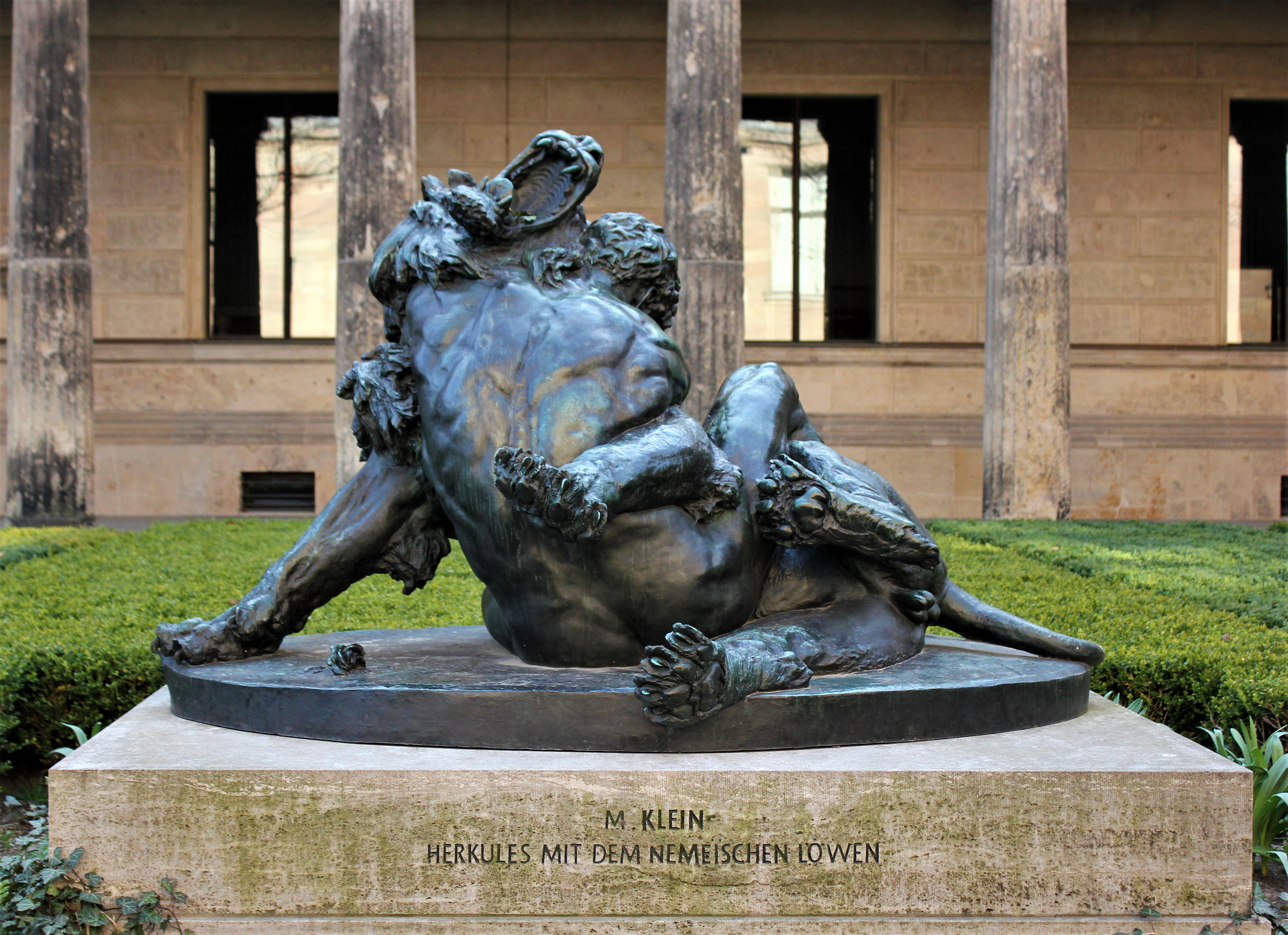
Hercules and the Nemean Lion

His family was very poor. After finishing primary school, he learned watchmaking, then went to Pest, where he was employed in the sculpture workshop of Ferenc Szandház (1827–1902), and his brother Károly (1824–1892). He studied briefly at the Prussian Academy of Arts, in 1865, but had to leave for financial reasons.

In 1869, he went to Rome for further training. While there, he joined the Deutscher Künstlerverein, but was a member for only a year. He travelled back through Breslau, Vienna, and Munich; arriving in Berlin in 1874. There, he worked in the studios of the animal painter, Carl Steffeck. After a second trip to Rome, he returned to Berlin, where he settled permanently in the Grunewald district.

His debut came at an academy exhibition in 1877, but received little public recognition until 1879, when he displayed a dramatic bronze group, Hercules and the Nemean Lion. In 1881, he was awarded a major commission to create figures of Plato and Aristotle, for the Joachimsthalsches Gymnasium, a school that was founded in the 17th century.

In 1886, he became a naturalized citizen and married Eva Dohm, the youngest daughter of Ernst Dohm, Editor-in-Chief of the satirical magazine, Kladderadatsch, and his wife, the writer Hedwig Dohm. Their daughter, Miriam (1886–1977) was married to the psychologist, Kurt Koffka, and worked as a translator.

He was a regular exhibitor at the Große Berliner Kunstausstellung; notably in 1900, when he presented a large statue of Samson, bound and blinded. In 1901, he was awarded the title of Professor. His last work, a statue of Theodor Fontane, was left unfinished. It was completed by Fritz Schaper and dedicated two years later in the Tiergarten. It has since been replaced by a copy, and the original is in the Märkisches Museum.
