= Elbe-Parey =

- Municipality
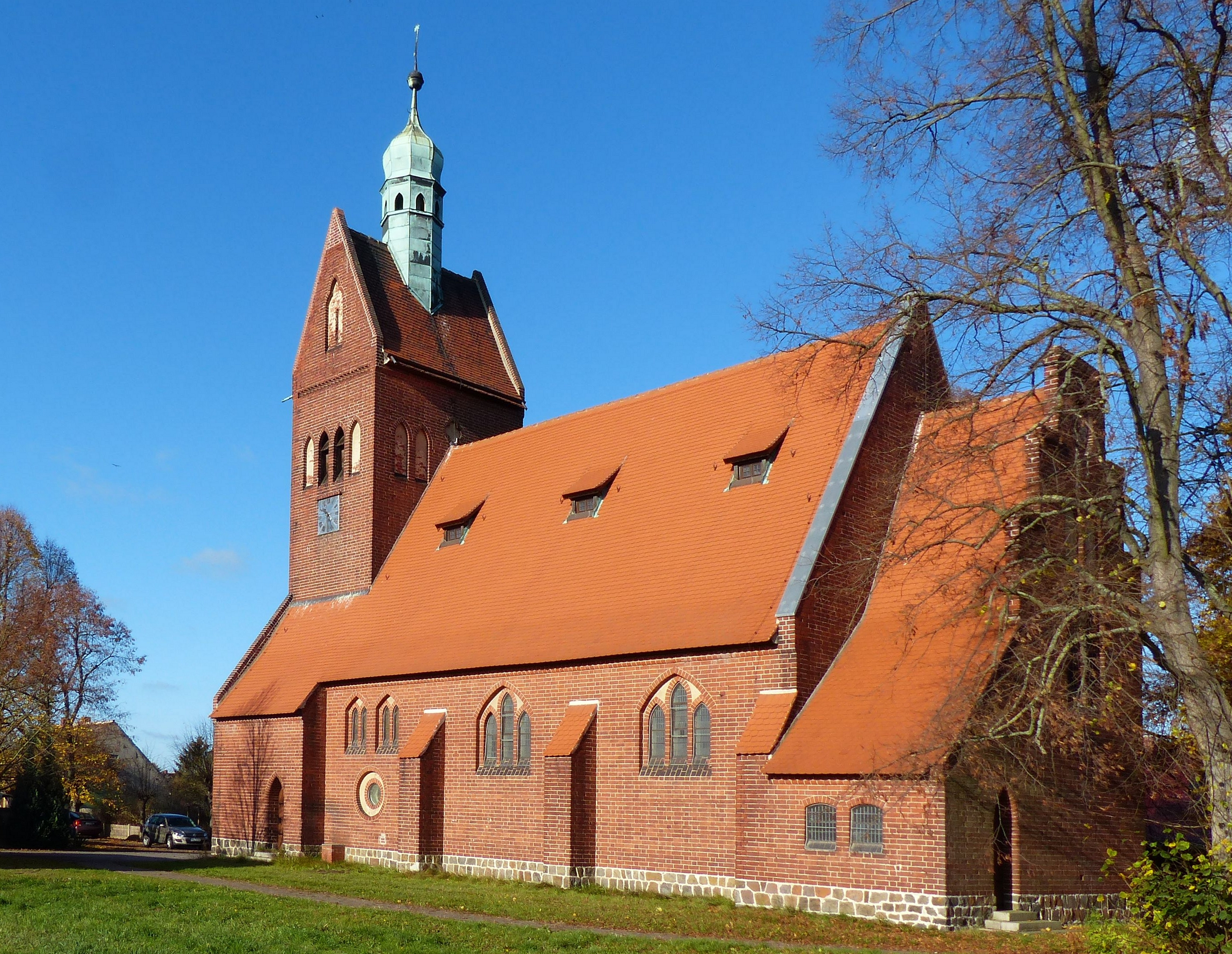
- Church in the municipal part of Derben

- Coat of arms

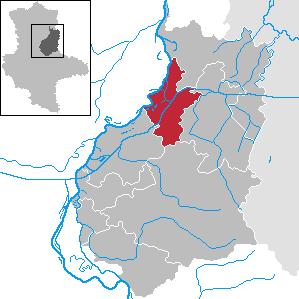
- Location of Elbe-Parey within Jerichower Land district
- Interactive map of Elbe-Parey
- Location within Germany Location within Saxony-Anhalt
- Coordinates: 52°23′N 12°1′E
- Country: Germany
- State: Saxony-Anhalt
- District: Jerichower Land
- Subdivisions: 7

Government
  - Mayor (2022–29): Nicole Golz

Area
  - Total: 108.7 km^{2} (42.0 sq mi)
- Elevation: 32 m (105 ft)

Population (2025-12-31)
  - Total: 6,300
  - Density: 58/km^{2} (150/sq mi)
- Time zone: UTC+01:00 (CET)
  - Summer (DST): UTC+02:00 (CEST)
- Postal codes: 39307 39317
- Dialling codes: 039349
- Vehicle registration: JL
- Website: www.elbe-parey.de

Elbe-Parey (German pronunciation: [ˈɛlbə paˈʁaɪ]) is a municipality in the Jerichower Land district, in Saxony-Anhalt, Germany. It is situated on the Elbe-Havel Canal, approx. 40 km northeast of Magdeburg. It was established in September 2001 by the merger of the seven former municipalities Bergzow, Derben, Ferchland, Güsen, Hohenseeden, Parey and Zerben.

Zerben was the birthplace (1853) of Elisabeth von Ardenne, on whose life the novel "Effi Briest" is considered to be based.
