= A Heritage and Its History =

1959 novel by Ivy Compton-Burnett

- First edition
- Author: Ivy Compton-Burnett
- Language: English
- Genre: Family saga
- Publisher: Gollancz
- Publication date: 1959
- Publication place: United Kingdom
- Media type: Print (hardback)
- Pages: 240 pp

A Heritage and Its History is a novel by Ivy Compton-Burnett first published in 1959 by Victor Gollancz.

== Plot summary ==
69-year-old Sir Edwin Challoner lives with his extended family in a grand old house in rural Southern England. Unmarried, he has no direct issue, and the person closest to him is his younger brother Hamish, who is also his business associate. Hamish has a wife, Julia, and two sons, Simon, aged 25, and Walter, three years younger, who has dropped out of Oxford to be a poet.

When Hamish Challoner dies of a heart condition, Simon prepares to become head of the house, as everyone assumes that it will only be a matter of a few years, if not months, before Sir Edwin also dies. However, the lonely old patriarch surprises them by announcing his impending marriage to their neighbour Rhoda Graham, who is more than 40 years his junior. After the newlyweds have returned from their honeymoon, Simon and Rhoda share a moment of unbridled passion in the old house ("Youth and instinct did their work"), and Rhoda becomes pregnant. As Sir Edwin and his wife have not had any sex during their brief marriage, there is no doubt as to who has sired the child. However, Sir Edwin decides to be its legal father, and swears Simon, Rhoda, and Walter to secrecy about the paternity of Rhoda's baby. When a healthy boy is born, he names him Hamish in honour of his deceased brother.

The implications of this arrangement, ostensibly contrived to keep up appearances, are far-reaching. Suddenly Simon finds himself no longer in a position to inherit his uncle's fortune, which has been the only object of his life ever since he was a child, and he only has himself to blame for it. In addition, he feels that the natural order of things has been turned upside down as now his own son is to precede him as heir to the family estate. When, on top of all that, Sir Edwin asks Julia, Walter and Simon to live elsewhere, the latter feels "displaced" as well as "deposed". It occurs to him that, as a sort of recompense, he might marry Fanny Graham, Rhoda's younger sister, and move into the Grahams' large house, almost empty now, which is conveniently close to the family seat. A few weeks after that, the marriage is announced.

Almost two decades later, Simon and Fanny Challoner have five children: Graham, aged 18; Naomi, aged 17; Ralph, 15; and two little ones, three-year-old Claud and two-year-old Emma. They still live in the other house together with Julia and Walter, and Sir Edwin Challoner, now approaching 90, is still alive. Hamish has received a good education and been prepared to inherit both the title and the place from who he believes is his natural father. Simon's line of the family, on the other hand, have been leading rather a modest life, with constant half-serious references to the workhouse as their ultimate dwelling place. Then, another four years later, the past suddenly catches up with the Challoners when Hamish and Naomi announce their intention to get married. It falls to Simon to make a late confession to prevent incest between two of his children. Walter, always the poet, calls his brother "the hero of a tragedy. It is a pity you are the villain as well."

The one person most profoundly shocked by the revelation is Hamish, who, on an impulse, renounces his heritage ("I shall never marry, as I cannot marry Naomi") and goes abroad to escape the familial tension and to acquire new perspectives. When Sir Edwin, now aged 94, feels that he is going to die, he calls for his son, and Hamish arrives home on what turns out to be the eve of his father's death. On his deathbed, the old man makes Hamish promise to take his place as head of the house. It does not take long before the family realise that, as far as the inheritance is concerned, Hamish has actually made two conflicting promises, both under emotional stress, and that he will have to break one of them.

After the funeral, Hamish surprises the Challoners by presenting to them Marcia, the woman he is going to marry. Describing herself as "older and plainer and less poor than I ought to be," Marcia dislikes the old house the moment she sets eyes on it. Said to be easily influenced, especially by his wife, Hamish finally cedes his inheritance to Simon, thus breaking the word he has given his deceased father. Relying on his spouse's financial support, it is now his turn, together with Marcia and his mother, to move out of the house and restore it to Simon, who has always considered it rightfully his. ("A few words sent the history of the house into another channel.") However, despite the fact that they are now occupying the position which was originally intended for them, Simon and his legitimate children are plagued by thoughts of the future now that the title and the place have been separated. On the one hand, Hamish's unborn children might object to their father having given up his heritage. Also, after Simon's death, it might seem more natural for his oldest son to succeed him, and that would be Hamish again rather than Graham. Ralph sums up these thoughts by remarking that "there may be troubles ahead."

These deliberations are cut short by the arrival of two telegrams from Marcia informing them that Hamish has died after a short illness—of a heart condition, just like his grandfather—, and that she is not pregnant. In the end Rhoda and Marcia, who have decided to keep on living together, return to the neighbourhood of the old house. Hamish has bequeathed almost everything to Simon, with only a small allowance for Marcia. Moreover, the title and the place are united again, and Simon Challoner becomes Sir Simon.

== Quotations ==
- "Good qualities involve effort. Without it they would not exist." (Chapter I)
- "It is in our minds that we live much of our life." (Chapter II)
- "Our lives are never our own. They are bound up with other lives. They belong in part to other people." (Chapter IV)
- "Duty is seldom liked either by the doer or the object." (Chapter X)
- "To live is nothing but wishing. It is always too late." (Chapter XIII)

== Theatrical and television adaptations ==
A Heritage and Its History was the first Compton-Burnett novel to be adapted for the stage. Dramatized by Julian Mitchell and directed by Frank Hauser, it premiered at the Oxford Playhouse in 1965. The play opened at the Phoenix Theatre in London's West End on 18 May 1965.

Mitchell also adapted the dramatised version for television. A Heritage and Its History was originally broadcast on 19 August 1968 as part of the ITV Playhouse series (Season 2, Episode 4).

== Reviews ==
- David Daiches: "Amid Edwardians, a Greek Curse", The New York Times (31 January 1960), p.BR5.
- "The Hells of Ivy", Time (15 February 1960).
- Harold Hobson: "What He Desires", The Christian Science Monitor (29 April 1965) (a review of the stage play)
- Another review of the stage play, from Theatre World (June 1965).

== See also ==
- Family saga
- Adultery in literature
- Consanguinity
