= Wanderungen durch die Mark Brandenburg =

Literary work by German writer Theodor Fontane

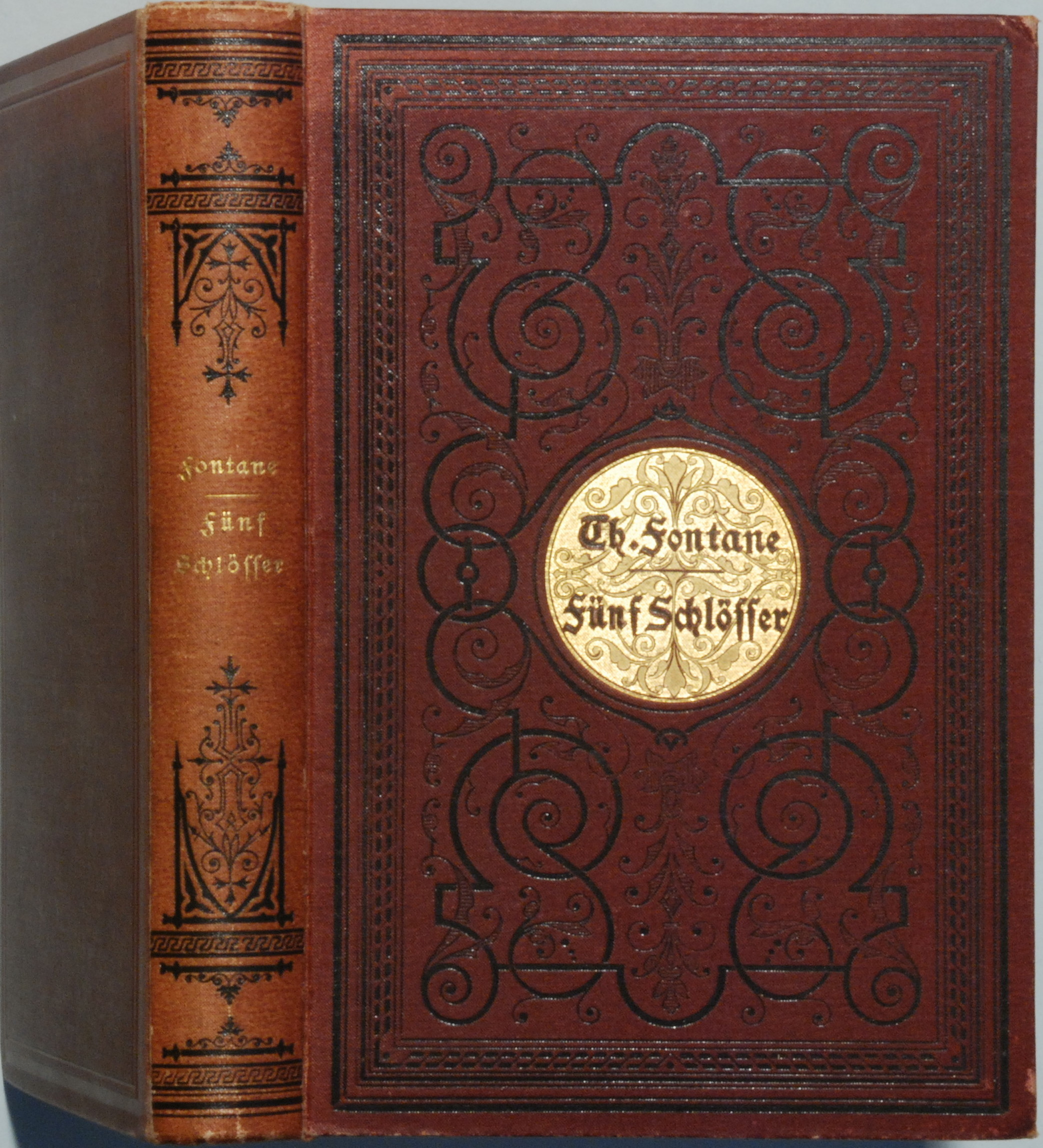
First edition (1889) of Fünf Schlösser, the final volume of Wanderungen durch die Mark Brandenburg

Wanderungen durch die Mark Brandenburg ("Ramblings through Brandenburg", "Rambles in Brandenburg" or "Walks through the March of Brandenburg") is a five-volume travelogue by the German writer Theodor Fontane, originally published in 1862–1889. It is his longest work and forms a bridge between his early career as a poet and his later novels. It covers the history, architecture, and people of the region as well as its landscape, and influenced the German Youth Movement of the early twentieth century.

== Background and composition ==
In his preface, Fontane wrote that the inspiration for Wanderungen durch die Mark Brandenburg came on a visit to Loch Leven Castle in Scotland in 1858, when he remembered visiting Rheinsberg Palace, a similarly situated castle in Brandenburg, and realised the two were comparably memorable experiences; so he decided to share with the German readership the attractions of his native region. He began the trips through Brandenburg on which the work is based in summer 1859, taking an informal and selective approach that he compared to "a walker picking individual ears of grain" as opposed to "someone taking a sickle to gather in the harvest". He wrote down his impressions and stories immediately or soon afterwards. By 1860, he estimated in a letter to Theodor Storm that the work might take him ten years and add up to twenty volumes; in actuality, interrupted by other writing, it took him thirty years, but there were originally only four volumes, Die Grafschaft Ruppin (1862), Das Oderland (1863), Das Havelland (1872) and Das Spreeland (1882). In 1889 he added a fifth, Fünf Schlösser.

Fontane noted the earlier work of Wilhelm Heinrich Riehl, Naturgeschichte des Volkes (1851–1869), which also presents the German land and people as fundamentally linked; and acknowledged a debt to the procedure he laid out there: preparation through study, walking in the area and talking to the residents, keeping a diary, and including anecdotes about the journey.

== Form and themes ==
Fontane hoped to make readers aware of the beauty of Brandenburg, but also of its history in the context of Prussia, both because an awareness of history would be necessary for them to not neglect, for example, a plain-looking but significant castle or the uninteresting-looking site of the Battle of Fehrbellin, but also because he hoped to increase awareness of and affection for historical personages. Initially, he hoped to illuminate the humanity of historic personages rather than writing only of battles and statecraft, and thereby to rouse readers to affection, even love; however, the army being central to Prussian history, by the time he wrote the foreword to the second edition of Volume 1, he had realised that the achievements of the Prussian army must be an ever-present part of the story.

Wanderungen durch die Mark Brandenburg presents a mixture of styles and content. Volume 1 begins as a general overview, but history and people increasingly predominate; there are sections on the history of art and architecture and extended narratives of family and local history as well as descriptions of the landscape and accounts of significant events. One scholar, Werner Lincke, has divided the work into four main stylistic segments: the feuilleton, the novella, the essay on art history, and the specialised treatise.

He also urged travellers who followed in his footsteps to listen to the ordinary people of the region. Particularly in the informal recounting of events, with digressions and recording of dialect, the work prepared the way for his later work as a novelist.

== Reception ==
During Fontane's lifetime he was accused, particularly by Adolf Stahr in the liberal National-Zeitung, of being overly sycophantic towards the Prussian nobility, in particular because of his conservative politics and employment with the conservative Kreuzzeitung, where he published many of the first sections in advance. Fontane strongly denied currying favour, stating that he was writing "out of pure love of the native soil".

Wanderungen durch die Mark Brandenburg influenced the German Youth Movement and völkisch thought in general, in its presentation of the region and its people as "an indivisible whole" (although Riehl's work was even more influential), and remains popular today.

== Film version ==
A five-part film closely following the structure of the books and shot on location in the then German Democratic Republic was directed by Eberhard Itzenplitz to a script by Horst Pillau and shown on West German television in 1986.
