= Carl Breitbach =

German painter

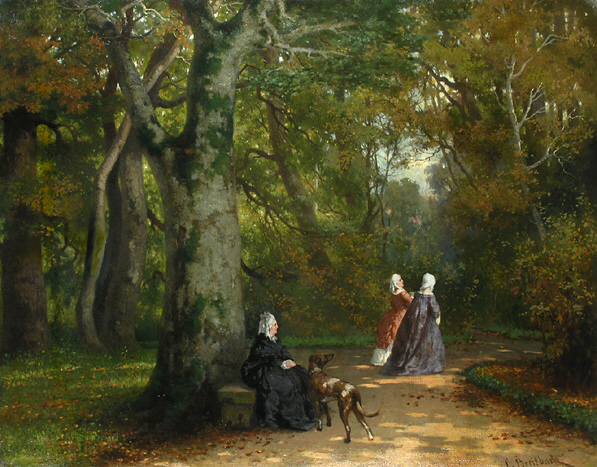
Three Women in the Park

Carl Breitbach (1833–1904) was a German painter.

== Biography ==
He was born in Berlin, and was a pupil of the Prussian Academy of Arts in that city, and of Thomas Couture in Paris. He settled in Berlin, where he devoted himself to landscape, genre, and portrait painting.

== Works ==
The following are among his principal works:

- "Mill of Saint-Ouen, near Paris"
- "Park of Trianon"
- "Autumn Evening in the Weser Valley"
- "Sunrise in the Bavarian Highlands"
- "Kirmess-Joy"
- "Kirmess-Woe"
- "At the Fortune Teller's"
- "In the Village Tavern"

He did portraits of Intendant General von Hülsen, the painter Theodor Weber, the writer Theodor Fontane and others.

== See also ==
- List of German painters
