= Irretrievable =

Novel written by Theodor Fontane

- First edition (German)
- Author: Theodor Fontane
- Original title: Unwiederbringlich
- Translator: Douglas Parmée (1963 and 2011)
- Language: German
- Genre: Novel
- Publisher: New York Review of Books
- Publication date: 1892
- Publication place: Germany
- English publication date: February 2011
- Media type: Print Paperback
- ISBN: 978-1-59017-374-9

Irretrievable (German: Unwiederbringlich, 1892, also known as Beyond Recall and No Way Back ) is one of realist Theodor Fontane's mature German novels. As with some other of Fontane's novels (including Effi Briest), its heroine is believed to be based roughly on a real person whose demise Fontane heard about, and it deals delicately with topics that, at the time it was written, were close to being taboo, including adultery and suicide.

The novel has been translated into English twice. The first translation, by Douglas Parmée, was published in 1963 as Beyond Recall and republished in 2011 by New York Review of Books as Irretrievable. In 2010 a new English translation, No Way Back, was published by Angel Classics (London).

There is a German TV movie based on the novel, directed by Falk Harnack and first broadcast in 1968.

== Plot summary ==
The novel takes place in Holstein in the years 1859–1861, five years before the German-Danish War, at a time when Holstein was governed by Denmark. Count Helmuth Holk lives with his countess Christine and their two children in a lonely valley. Christine, who was raised by nuns, is serious and pious, but Holk is fun-loving by nature. When Holk is called away to the court of a Danish princess in Copenhagen he becomes fascinated by Ebba von Rosenberg, a young companion of the princess who flirts with him. His marriage with Christine begins to seem unbearably dull and he rashly seeks a divorce before realizing that Ebba's attentions are not serious. A long separation between Holk and Christine ends only after several years and great efforts by their friends. On the surface all seems well, but Christine is haunted by the rejection and drowns herself in the sea.

== Editions ==
The novel was serialized in the Deutsche Rundschau (Nr. 66/67, January and June 1891), then published as a book by Verlag Wilhelm Hertz of Berlin in 1892.

== Adaptations ==
- Radio play with Paul Edwin Roth, Rosemarie Gerstenberg, Christine Schoenfelder, Martin Hirthe and Edith Heerdegen, treatment: Palma, direction: Ulrich Lauterbach, Hessische Rundfunk 1957.
- TV film with Lothar Blumhagen, Hans Timmermann, Alexander Kerst, Tilo von Berlepsch, Walter Buschhoff, Karin Hübner, Lil Dagover and Käthe Braun, script by Max Gundermann and Falk Harnack, directed by Falk Harnack, Berliner-Union-Film, West Germany 1968
- Audio book read by Gert Westphal, 8 CDs, Deutsche Grammophon, ISBN 3-8291-1357-9

== Translations into English ==
- Beyond Recall, translated by Douglas Parmée, published 1963; republished by New York Review of Books as Irretrievable, with a new foreword, in 2011 ISBN 978-1-59017-374-9
- No Way Back, translated by Hugh Rorrison and Helen Chambers, London: Angel Classics, September 2010 ISBN 978-0-946162-76-5
