= On Naïve and Sentimental Poetry =

Paper by Friedrich Schiller

"On Naïve and Sentimental Poetry" (German: "Über naive und sentimentalische Dichtung") is a 1795–6 paper by Friedrich Schiller on poetic theory and the different types of poetic relationship to the world. The work divides poetry into two forms. Naïve poetry is poetry of direct description while sentimental poetry is self-reflective. While naïve presents a straight narrative or description, sentimental poetry is built around the author's reflections and relationship to the material.

Schiller classifies all poets as either naïve or sentimental. Almost all Classical Greek poets wrote in the naïve mode, with the exception of Euripides. The modern poetry of Schiller's era tended to the sentimental, but figures such as Shakespeare and Goethe were mainly naïve poets to Schiller. This classification of poetry differed from that of Karl Wilhelm Friedrich Schlegel, who saw poetry as firmly divided by era.
