= Frau Jenny Treibel =

1892 German-language novel by Theodor Fontane

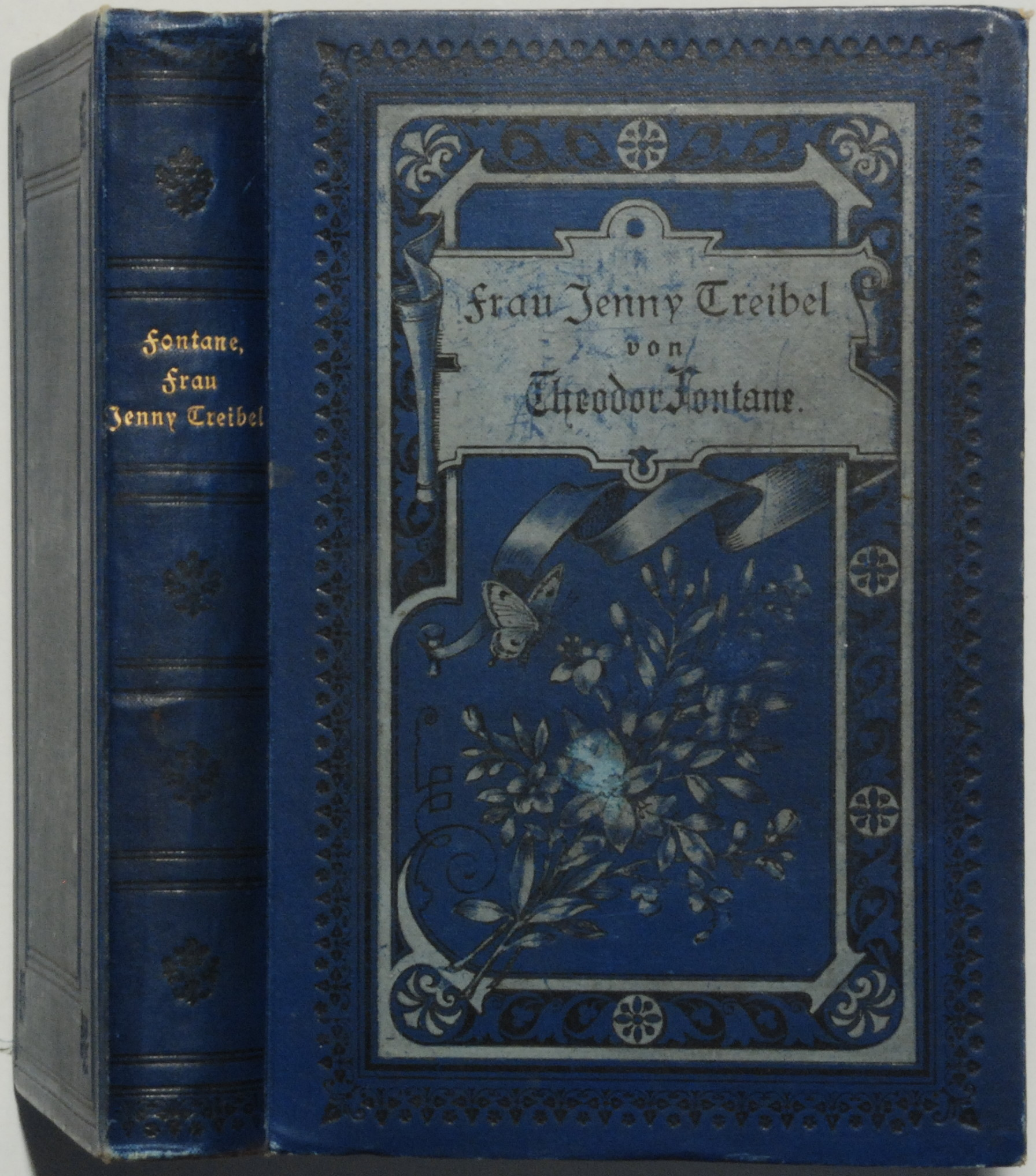
First print 1892, original cover

Frau Jenny Treibel is a German novel published in 1892 by Theodor Fontane.

== Plot ==
The primary subject of the novel revolves around two Berlin families. One is the upper-class Treibel family consisting of the Councillor of commerce and his wife, Frau Jenny, as well as their sons Otto and Leopold. The other family is that of Professor Wilibald Schmidt and his daughter Corinna. The families have a connection that has existed for decades. Years before, when Wilibald was still a student, he was also the secret admirer of Jenny, who at that time was the daughter of Wilibald's landlord. The landlord was the proprietor of a small basement shop. Willibald even went so far as to write poems and songs for Jenny in which he pronounced his love for her, though she ultimately decided to marry another, wealthier man. While the poetry is not of great literary value, it is heartfelt and Jenny has it read out on social occasions, where she declares that she deeply connects with the themes of discarding material wealth and caring only for the higher, purer ideals. The hypocrisy of this is not lost on Wilibald, who muses to his nephew Marcell that Jenny has a talent for forgetting everything that she wants to forget, and a heart only for that which can be weighed and measured and gives financial returns.

Wilibald would like to see his daughter Corinna marry her cousin Marcell, a promising future archaeologist. Unfortunately, Marcell can not propose to her yet, as he lacks the financial means. In any case, the intelligent and independent Corinna has other plans for herself. She wants to break out of the rather mediocre world of a secondary school teacher's household. She finds the social life with the wives of the other teachers quite boring, and her father's correction of pupils’ school work offers little variation. Thus Corinna sets herself to marrying Leopold Treibel. Social position and material prosperity would seem to her an adequate guarantee for a happy future. Thus she uses any means possible in order to lure the kind but easily influenced Leopold into her trap. She uses all the charm and wit she can manage. Two dinner parties and an outing later she achieves her goal. They enter into a secret engagement. When Jenny finds out about the engagement, she is furious and makes it clear to Corinna that she does not want it to go ahead; Jenny is not bothered by Corinna's materialistic motives, but abhors the idea of Leopold marrying someone poorer and of lower social standing. Leopold, who is a shy and timid young man, promises Corinna that he will stand up to his mother and that the two shall be wed. Over a longer period he sends her letters, in which he proposes all sorts of ideas (such as the pair of them fleeing to Gretna Green). Unfortunately he does not follow through on these promises and when Corinna realizes this, she breaks off the engagement and mends her relationship with Marcell. The novel ends with Corinna and Marcell's wedding, which reunites the Treibel and Schmidt families, as all Treibel family members except Leopold attend. The reader is led to believe that Leopold marries Hildegard Munk (whom Jenny didn't really want as a daughter in law but preferred to Corinna due to her better financial standing).
