= The Stechlin =

Novel by Theodor Fontane

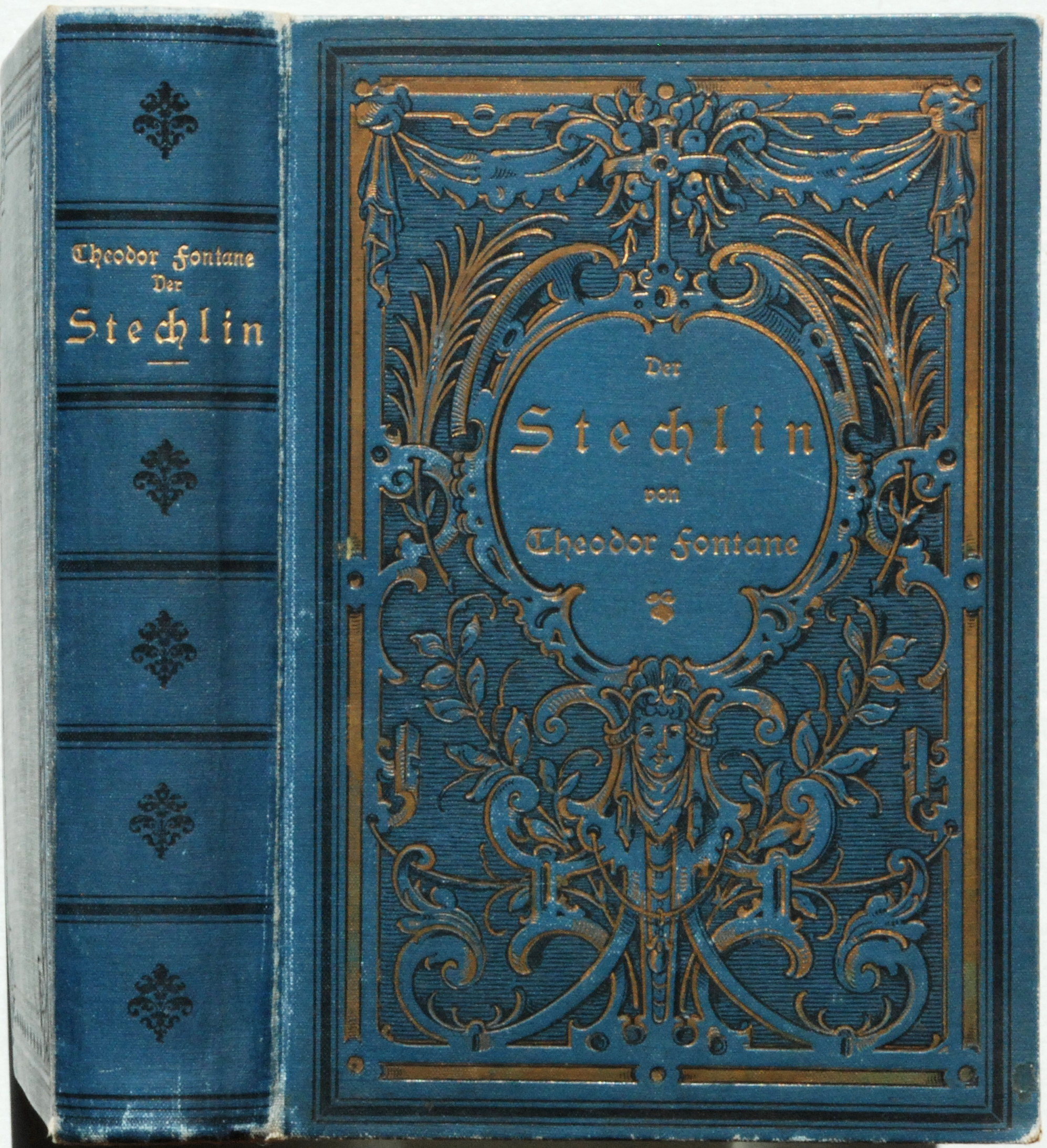
- First edition
- Author: Theodor Fontane
- Original title: Der Stechlin
- Language: German
- Publication place: Germany

The Stechlin (German: Der Stechlin, German pronunciation: [deːɐ̯ ʃtɛçˈliːn]) is a novel by Theodor Fontane written between 1895 and 1897, and first published in the literary journal Über Land und Meer. It was published in book form in 1898. It is Fontane's second longest novel, and his last novel published before he died, about a year after its publication.

Its central figure is the aging Dubslav von Stechlin, widowed for thirty years and living alone in his somewhat dilapidated mansion near the shore of Lake Stechlin, to be imagined as being in the neighbourhood of Fontane's native Neuruppin. Dubslav, a man of honest and humorous character, refuses to take himself seriously, and lives modestly and contentedly in contact with his elderly valet Engelke, his politically progressive vicar Lorenzen, and Krippenstapel, the most Prussian of Prussian schoolmasters. Dubslav's only son, Woldemar, is a captain in a cavalry regiment of the guard in Berlin.

Through the character of Stechlin, Fontane depicted an ideal type of a patriarchal family head of Prussian Junker.
