= Effi Briest =

1894 German-language novel by Theodor Fontane

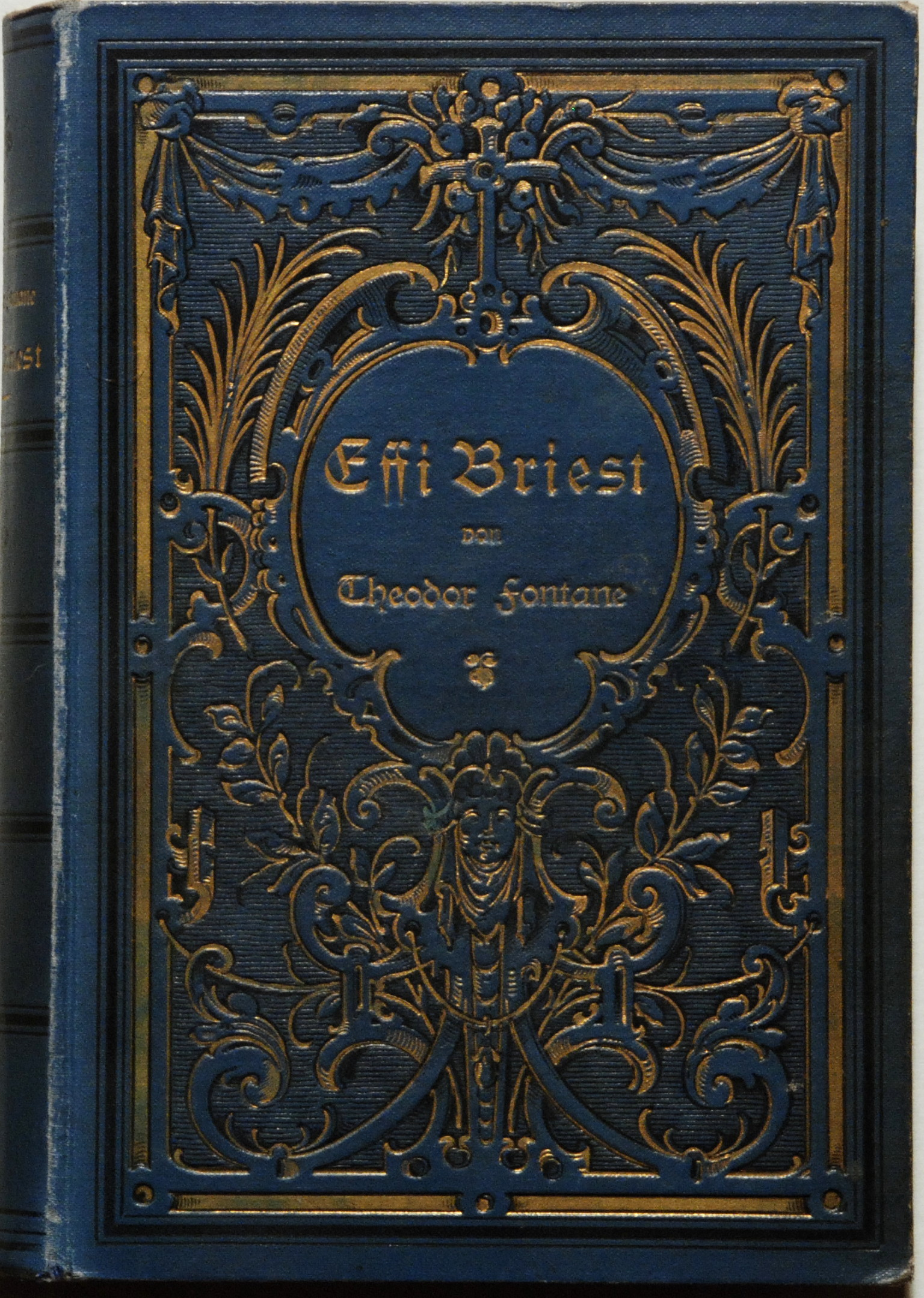
- Cover of the original edition
- Author: Theodor Fontane
- Translator: Hugh Rorrison and Helen Chambers
- Language: German
- Genre: Novel
- Publisher: Philipp Reclam jun. Stuttgart & (Eng. trans. reissue Penguin Classics)
- Publication date: 1894–95; 1895 (book)
- Publication place: Germany
- Media type: Print (Hardback & Paperback)
- ISBN: 978-3-15-006961-5; ISBN 0-14-044766-0 (reissue)

Effi Briest (German pronunciation: [ˈɛfi ˈbʁiːst]) is a realist novel by Theodor Fontane, published in book form in 1895. It can be thematically compared to other novels on 19th-century marriage from a female perspective, such as Anna Karenina and Madame Bovary, which are also adultery tragedies.

== Plot introduction ==
Seventeen-year-old Effi Briest, the daughter of a German aristocrat, is married off to 38-year-old Baron Geert von Innstetten, who courted her mother Luise and was spurned for his status, which he has now improved.

== Plot summary ==
Effi Briest, who is attracted by social status, moves to the fictional Pomeranian port of Kessin (loosely modeled on Swinemünde). Her husband Innstetten is away for weeks at a time, and Effi, who is shunned by local nobles, finds but one friend. Her suspicions that their house may be haunted are not entirely laid to rest by Innstetten. When she says there may be a ghost, he derides her fears. The scorn he would bear if people knew of her terror would stall his career; hence his angry reply.

When Major Crampas arrives, Effi cannot help relishing his attentions despite Crampas being a married womaniser, and their love is consummated. Her husband looks down on Crampas, whom he finds a lewd philanderer with cavalier views of law. Crampas views Innstetten as a patronising prig.

Years later, Effi's daughter Annie is growing up, and the family moves to Berlin due to Innstetten's ascent. All seems well, until Innstetten finds letters exchanged between Effi and Crampas. Innstetten tells Crampas he wants to duel; he agrees and is killed by Innstetten. He divorces Effi. The Briests disown her, thinking it ill behooves them to deal with someone who tarnished their name. Innstetten gets custody of Annie and influences her to disdain Effi. When Effi and Annie meet briefly some years later, it is clear the two are estranged, and Effi stops trying to establish a good relationship with Annie. The halcyon days of Innstetten's past life are over, and career success fails to delight him.

Effi's parents take her back when she becomes the victim of nervous disorder, depression. Facing death, she asks Luise to tell Innstetten about her regrets and willingness to forgive him. Her death forms a rather symmetrical ending that matches the novel's start. In the end scene, her parents vaguely concede guilt for her fate without daring to question the social canons that sparked the tragedy, citing the German maxim, "That would be too wide a field" (ein weites Feld).

== Background ==
Manfred von Ardenne’s grandmother Baroness Elisabeth von Ardenne (née Baroness Elisabeth von Plotho) is said to have inspired Effi Briest.

The youngest of five children, Elisabeth was born in Zerben (currently part of Elbe-Parey) in 1853. Her easeful life was cut short by her meeting Armand Léon von Ardenne (1848–1919). She is said to have shown little interest in Ardenne; having rejected his first proposal, she changed her mind during the Franco-Prussian War, which left Ardenne injured. They became engaged on 7 February 1871 and wed in 1873.

His ascent made them move to Düsseldorf in the summer of 1881, where they met the famed and unhappily married judge Emil Hartwich (1843–1886). Elisabeth and Hartwich had much in common including their love of theatre. Despite risk of discovery, they did not cease corresponding when the Ardennes went back to Berlin on 1 October 1884.

Hartwich would come irregularly. During the summer of 1886, which Hartwich spent in Berlin, he and Elisabeth chose to marry each other. But Ardenne saw his secret suspicions confirmed when he found Elisabeth's and Hartwich's year-long correspondence. He filed for divorce and dueled Hartwich on 27 November 1886, drawing strong coverage. Hartwich died from his injuries on 1 December. Ardenne was sentenced to two years in prison but his term was reduced to 18 days.

His divorce on 15 March 1887 gave him full custody of his children, and his ex-wife set about caring for the deprived and disabled. Her name was temporarily removed from the family chronicles. In 1904, her daughter Margot was the first to try to find her; her son Egmont saw her in 1909. She died in Lindau on 4 February 1952 and was interred in a Berlin grave of honor (German: Ehrengrab).

=== Fiction and truth ===
Fontane changed myriad details so as not to imperil privacy of those involved. He also made changes for the sake of drama. Elisabeth married at age 19 instead of 17, with Ardenne being five, not twenty, years her senior. She fell in love with Hartwich after twelve years—not twelve months—of marriage, and Ardenne did not kill her paramour years after the dalliance, but when they were still courting. Fontane knew that Elisabeth did not retreat as Effi did; instead, she began to work and devote herself to the needy. Elisabeth died at 98 (in fact vastly outliving Fontane himself); Effi dies at 29 in the novel.

Some dates were altered, too. Effi marries on 3 October; Elisabeth wed on 1 January. Effi bears Annie on 3 July, while Margot's birthday was 5 November; Egmont's was 4 January. Elisabeth was born on 26 October; Effi has an August birthday.

== Legacy ==
Today Effi Briest is widely discussed and taught at German schools. It has greatly influenced German writers, including Thomas Mann in his creation of Buddenbrooks. Mann said that if one had to reduce one's library to six novels, Effi Briest would have to be one of them.

== Editions ==
- First published as a serial novel in Deutsche Rundschau, 1894 – 1895.
- Penguin Books, 1967 ISBN 0-14-044190-5
- English translation by Hugh Rorrison and Helen Chambers, Angel Books 1996 ISBN 0-946162-44-1, reissued by Penguin (in Penguin Classics) 2001 ISBN 0-14-044766-0
- English translation by Mike Mitchell, Oxford University Press 2015 ISBN 978-0-19-967564-7 (in the Oxford World's Classics series)

== Film and television adaptations ==
1. The False Step, Germany, 1939
  Director: Gustaf Gründgens
  Cast: Marianne Hoppe (Effi), Karl Ludwig Diehl (Innstetten), Paul Hartmann (Crampas)
2. Roses in Autumn, West Germany, 1955
  Director: Rudolf Jugert
  Cast: Ruth Leuwerik (Effi), Bernhard Wicki (Innstetten), Carl Raddatz (Crampas)
3. Effi Briest, East Germany 1968, West Germany 1971
  Director: Wolfgang Luderer
  Cast: Angelica Domröse (Effi), Horst Schulze (Innstetten), Dietrich Körner (Crampas)
4. Fontane Effi Briest, West Germany 1974
  Director: Rainer Werner Fassbinder
  Cast: Hanna Schygulla (Effi), Wolfgang Schenk (Innstetten), Ulli Lommel (Crampas)
5. Effi Briest, Germany 2009
  Director: Hermine Huntgeburth
  Cast: Julia Jentsch (Effi), Sebastian Koch (Innstetten), Mišel Matičević (Crampas)
6. Beach House, United States 2018
  Director: Jason Saltiel
  Cast: Willa Fitzgerald (Emma), Murray Bartlett (Paul), Orlagh Cassidy (Catherine), (Thomas M. Hammond) (Henry)
  Loosely based on the novel, Catherine's daughter Emma is also seen reading the novel on the beach.

== See also ==
- Adultery in literature
