= Theodor Fontane =

German journalist, novelist and poet

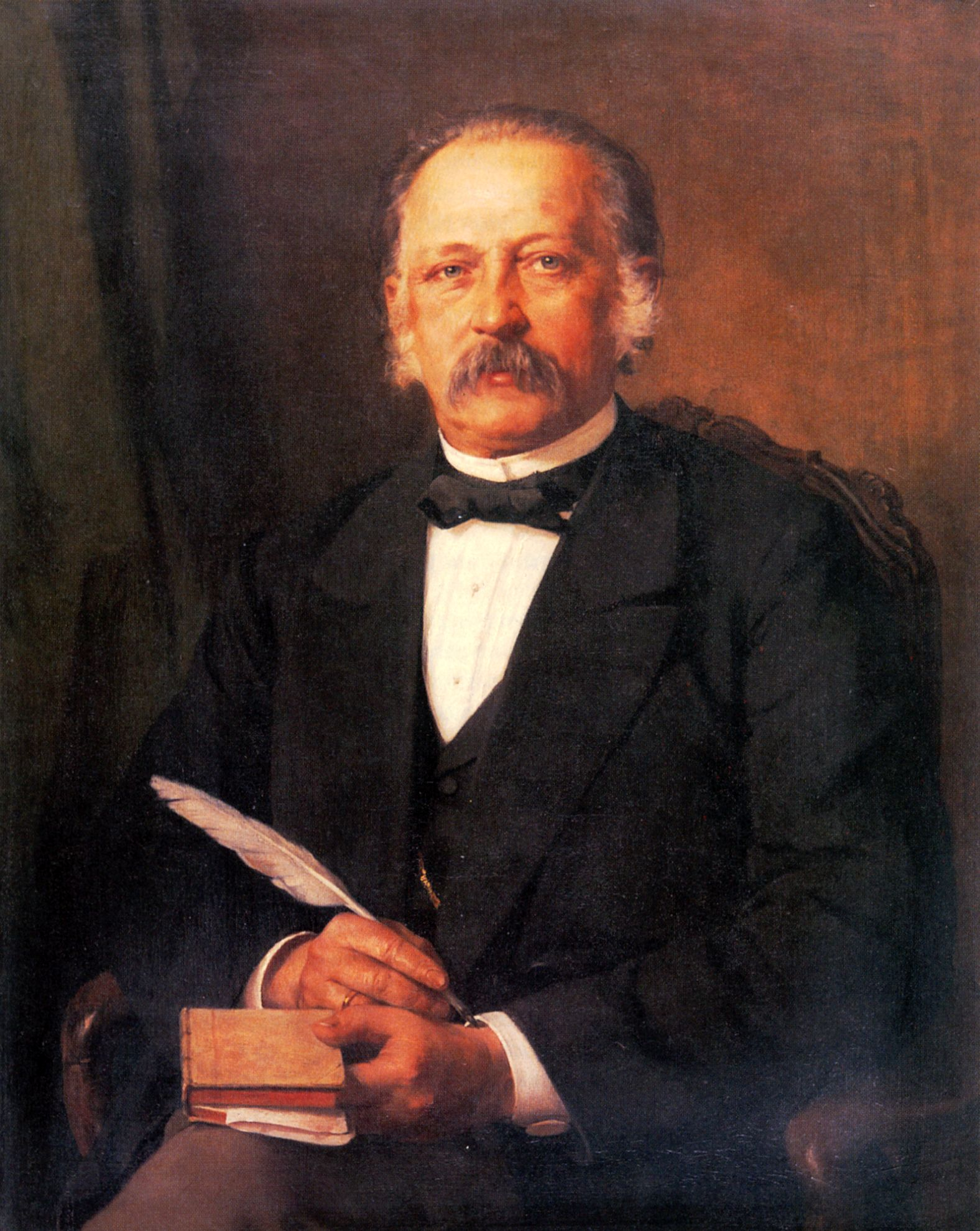
- Fontane (1883), painting by Carl Breitbach
- Born: 30 December 1819; Neuruppin, Brandenburg, Prussia
- Died: 20 September 1898 (aged 78); Berlin, German Empire
- Occupation: Writer
- Spouse: Emilie Rouanet-Kummer (1824–1902; m. 1850, until his death)
- Children: 7 (four of them lived into adulthood)
- Writing career
- Period: 19th century
- Genre: Novel
- Notable works: Effi Briest, On Tangled Paths, The Stechlin, Frau Jenny Treibel

Signature
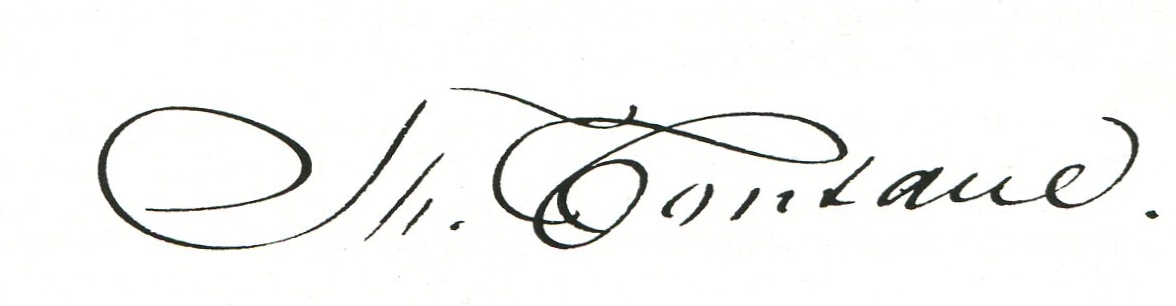

Theodor Fontane (German pronunciation: [ˈtʰeːodoɐ̯ fɔnˈtaːnə]; 30 December 1819 – 20 September 1898) was a German novelist and poet. He has been called "the greatest German realist novelist" and "clearly the greatest German novelist before Thomas Mann." He published the first of his novels, for which he is best known today, only at age 58 after a career as a journalist. Many of his novels delve into topics that were more or less taboo for discussion in the polite society of Fontane's day, including marital infidelity, class differences, urban vs. rural differences, abandonment of children, and suicide. His novels sold well during his lifetime and several have been adapted for film or audio works.

Fontane's novels are known for their complex, often sceptical view of society in the German empire. He shows different social and political parts of society meeting and sometimes clashing, his main characters range from lower-middle class to Prussian nobility. Fontane is known as a writer of realism, not only because he was conscientious about the factual accuracy of details in fictional scenes, but also because he depicted his characters in terms of what they said or did and refrained from overtly imputing motives to them. Other trademarks of Fontane's work are their strongly drawn female characters (such as Effi Briest and Frau Jenny Treibel), tender irony and vivid conversations between characters.

== Life ==
=== Youth ===
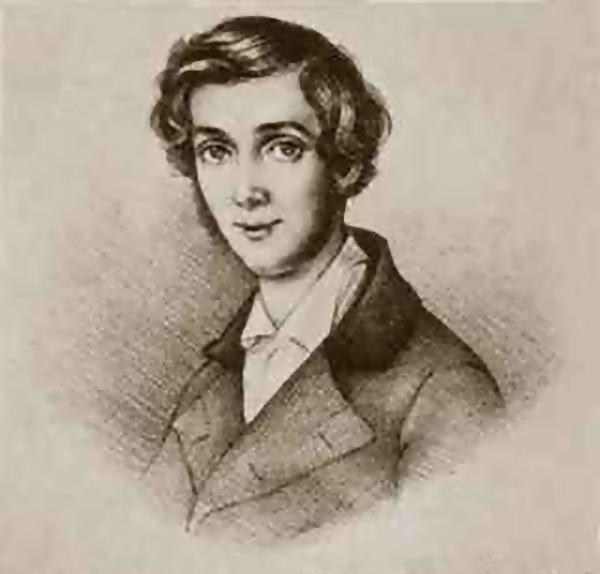
Fontane at age 23, drawing by Georg Friedrich Kersting

Fontane was born in Neuruppin, a town 30 miles northwest of Berlin, into a Huguenot family. At the age of sixteen he was apprenticed to an apothecary, his father's profession. He became an apothecary himself and in 1839, at the age of 20, wrote his first work (Heinrichs IV. erste Liebe, now lost). His further education was in Leipzig, where he became acquainted with the progressives of the Vormärz.

Fontane's first published work, the novella Geschwisterliebe (Sibling Love), was published in the Berlin Figaro in December 1839. His biographer Gordon A. Craig claimed it gave few indications of being a gifted writer: "Although the theme of incest, which was to occupy Fontane on later occasions, is touched upon here, the mawkishness of the tale... is equalled by the lameness of its plot and the inertness of the style in which it is told, and [the characters] Clärchen and her brother are both so colourless that no one could have guessed that their creator had a future as a writer."

Fontane's first job as apothecary was in Dresden, after which he worked in his father's shop in the town of Letschin in the Oderbruch region. Fleeing its provincialism, Fontane published articles in the Leipzig newspaper Die Eisenbahn and translated Shakespeare. In 1843 he joined a literary club in Berlin named Tunnel über der Spree (Tunnel over the River Spree) where he became acquainted with many of the most renowned German writers, including Theodor Storm, Joseph von Eichendorff and Gottfried Keller.

=== Newspaper writer and critic ===
In 1844, Fontane enlisted in the Prussian army and began the first of numerous journeys to Britain, which fostered his interest in old English ballads, which he – a lifelong anglophile – began to imitate. In 1845 became engaged to his future wife, Emilie Rouanet-Kummer, whom he had met when still at school.

Fontane played a brief part in the revolutionary events of 1848. In 1849 he left his job as an apothecary and became a full-time journalist and writer. In order to provide for his family he accepted a job as a writer with the Prussian intelligence agency Zentralstelle für Presseangelegenheiten, which was intended to influence the press towards the German nationalist cause. There he specialized in British affairs, and the agency made him for several years its correspondent in London, where he was later joined by Emilie, whom he had married in 1850, and their first two sons. While still in London he left his government job and on his return to Berlin became editor of the conservative newspaper Neue Preussische Zeitung. As a man of liberal sympathies for free press and a united Germany Fontane ruefully wrote to a friend about his job with the Zeitung: "I sold myself to the reaction for thirty pieces of silver a month... These days one cannot survive as an honest man."

=== London ===
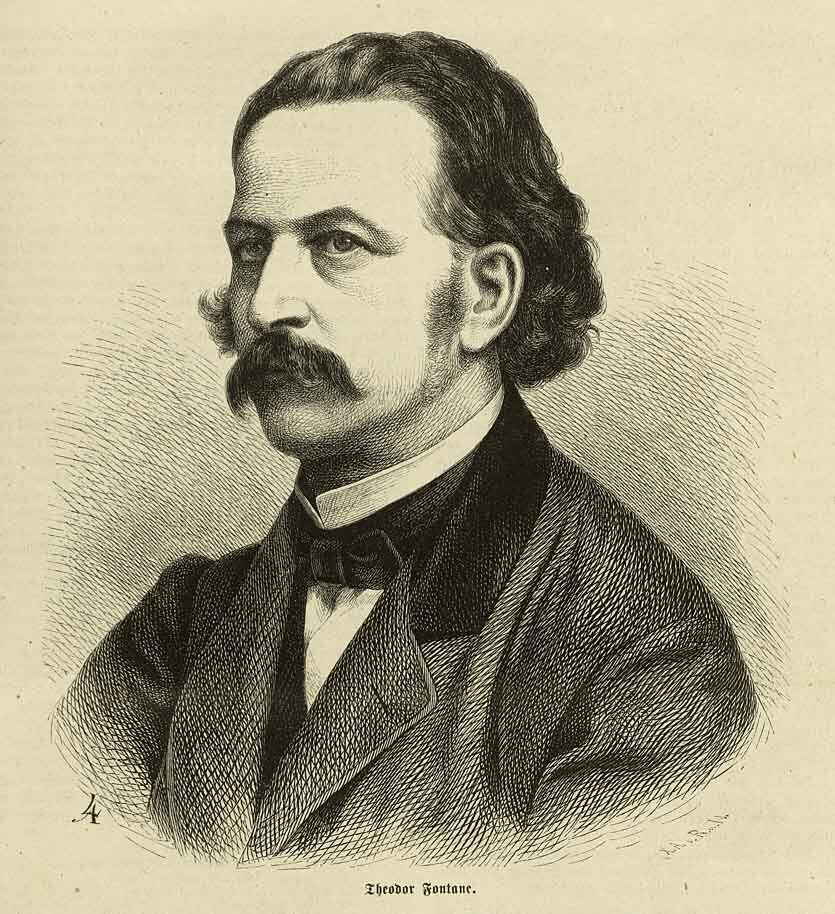
Theodor Fontane (c. 1860)

Fontane's travel books about Britain include Ein Sommer in London (A Summer in London, 1854), Aus England, Studien und Briefe (From England: Studies and Letters, 1860) and Jenseit des Tweed, Bilder und Briefe aus Schottland (Beyond the Tweed, Pictures and Letters from Scotland, 1860). In the books Fontane reflects both nature and the mood in Britain at that time. The success of the historical novels of Walter Scott had helped to make British themes much in vogue on the Continent. Fontane's Gedichte (Poems, 1851) and ballads Männer und Helden (Men and Heroes, 1860) tell of Britain's former glories. Back in Germany Fontane became particularly interested in his home province, the March of Brandenburg. He enjoyed rambling through its rural landscapes and small towns and delighted in the growth of its capital city, Berlin. His fascination with the countryside surrounding Berlin may be seen in his picturesque Wanderungen durch die Mark Brandenburg (Walks through the Province of Brandenburg, 1862–82, 5 vols), in which he extended his earlier fascination with British history to his native land.

=== Wars of German Unification ===
In 1870, Fontane quit his job at the Kreuzzeitung and became drama critic for the liberal Vossische Zeitung, a job he held until his retirement. He had already written about Prussia's war against Denmark in Der schleswig-holsteinische Krieg im Jahre 1864 (1866) and the Austro-Prussian War in Der deutsche Krieg von 1866 (1869). He went to the front to observe the Franco-Prussian War in 1870 and after being taken prisoner at Vaucouleurs remained in French captivity for three months. He memorialized his experiences in Kriegsgefangen Erlebtes 1870 (Experiences as a Prisoner of War, 1871) and published his observations concerning the campaign in the book Der Krieg gegen Frankreich 1870–71 (The War against France, 1870–71, published 1874–76). In his observations he strongly criticized Prussian militarism: "A mere glorification of the military without moral content or elevated aim is nauseating."

=== Later years ===
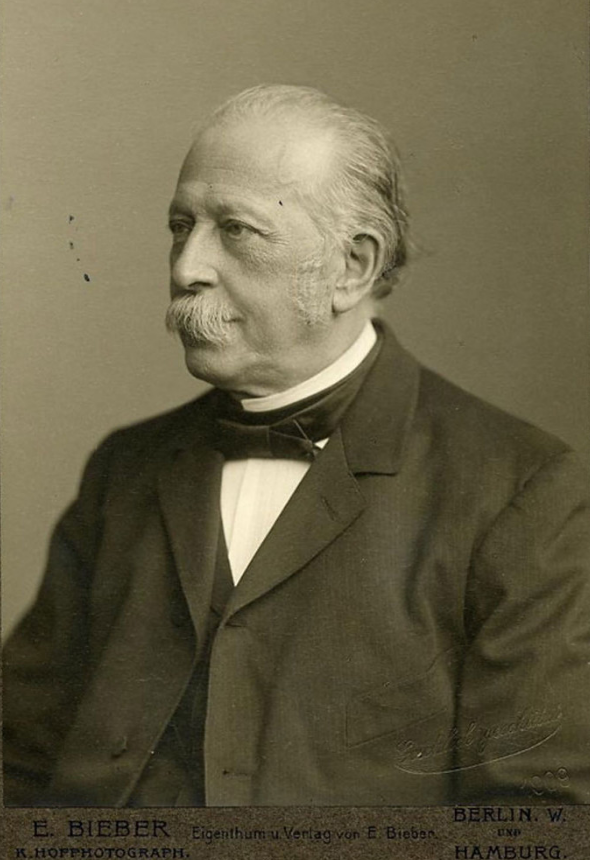
Theodor Fontane in 1894

At the age of 57, Fontane finally began work on his novels, for which he is remembered best today. Fontane's lifelong wish to be able to live from his literary works was finally fulfilled. A fine historical romance, Before the Storm (Vor dem Sturm, 1878), was followed by a series exploring modern life, notably L'Adultera (Woman Taken in Adultery, 1882), which was the first of his society novels and deemed risky for its theme of adultery.

His novels Irrungen, Wirrungen (Trials and Tribulations, 1888), Frau Jenny Treibel (1892) and Effi Briest (1894–95) yielded insights into the lives of the nobility and middle-class citizens. His achievement in this regard was later described as poetic realism. In Der Stechlin (written 1895–97), his last completed novel, Fontane adapted the realistic methods and social criticism of contemporary French fiction to the conditions of Prussian life.

=== Death ===
Fontane was plagued by health problems during his last years but continued to work until a few hours before his death. He died in the evening of 20 September 1898 in Berlin. As a member of the French Protestant Church of Berlin he was buried in the congregation's cemetery on the Liesenstraße. His wife, Emilie, was buried beside him four years later. Their graves were damaged during World War II but later restored.

== Influence on later writers ==
Many later writers were influenced by Fontane, or alluded to him in their works. They include Thomas Mann and his brother Heinrich, Samuel Beckett, and Günter Grass.

Beckett called Effi Briest "that most moving and beautiful novel" and includes references to it in Krapp's Last Tape and All That Fall.

Grass introduces Fontane into two of his books: Show Your Tongue, and the novel Too Far Afield, in which the main character is nicknamed "Fonty," and Theodor Fontane is "the hero's literary double and the author's source of innumerable allusions." The title Too Far Afield (Ein weites Feld) is taken from Fontane, as is that of Grass's absurdist play, Ten More Minutes to Buffalo (Noch zehn Minuten bis Buffalo).

== Prose works ==
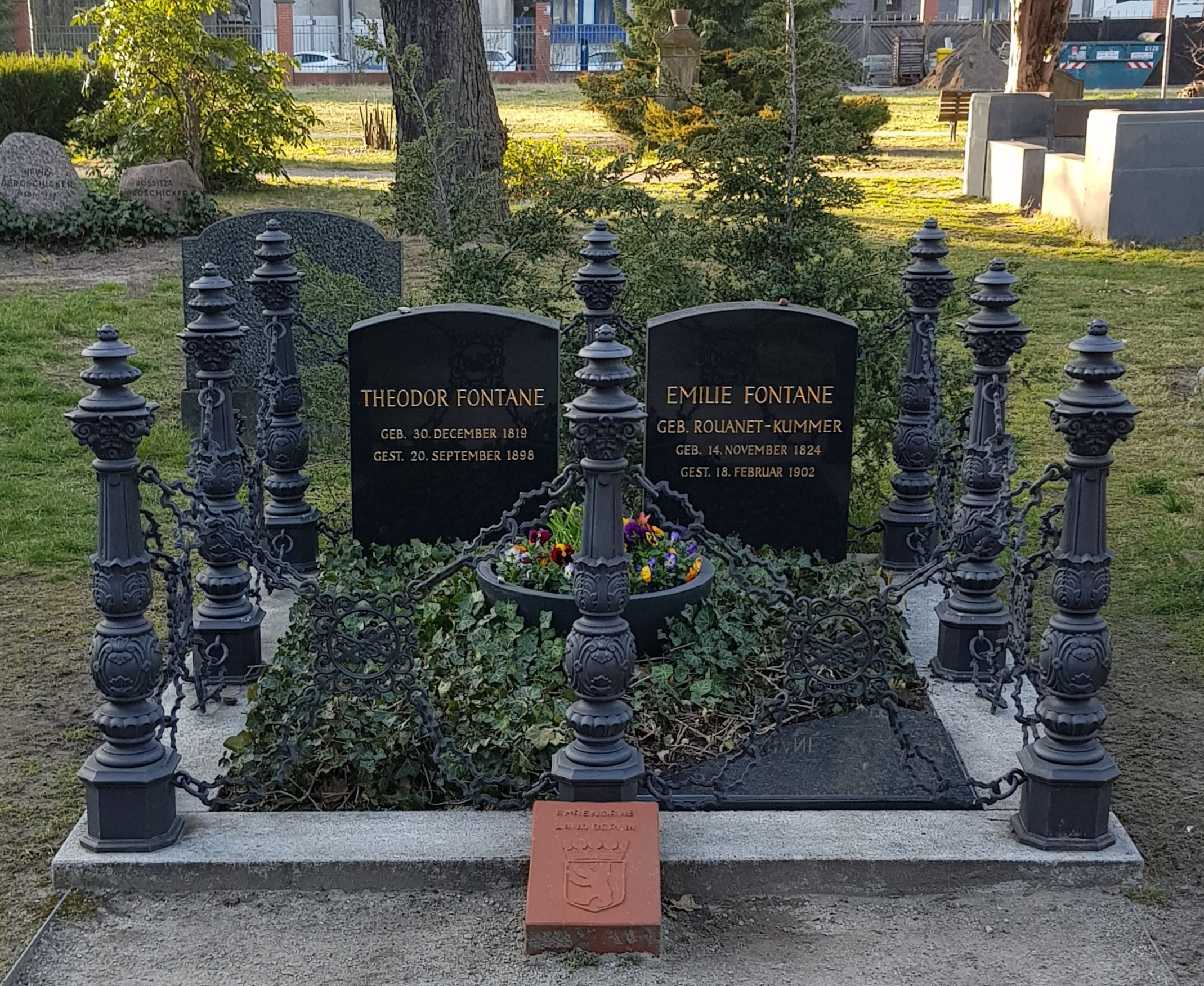
Graves of Theodor and Emilie Fontane in the Französische Friedhof, Liesenstraße, Berlin

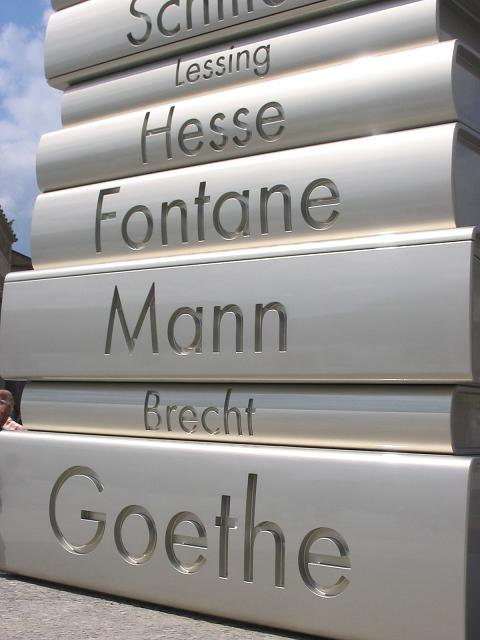
"Modern Book Printing" from the Walk of Ideas in Berlin, Germany – built during 2006 to commemorate Johannes Gutenberg's invention, c. 1445, of movable printing type. With Fontane's name among other famous German writers.

- Geschwisterliebe, 1839
- Zwei Post-Stationen, 1845
- James Monmouth, 1854
- Tuch und Locke, 1854
- Goldene Hochzeit, 1854
- Ein Sommer in London, 1854
- Aus England. Studien und Briefe über Londoner Theater, Kunst und Presse, 1860
- Jenseit des Tweed. Bilder und Briefe aus Schottland, 1861
- Wanderungen durch die Mark Brandenburg, 1862–89
- Der Schleswig-Holtsteinsche Krieg im Jahre 1864, 1866
- Kriegsgefangen. Erlebnis, 1870
- Der deutsche Krieg von 1866, 1870–71 (Translated as The German War of 1866)
- Vor dem Sturm, 1878 (translated as Before the Storm)
- Grete Minde, 1880
- Ellernklipp, 1881
- L'Adultera, 1882 (translated as Woman Taken in Adultery)
- Schach von Wuthenow, 1882 (translated as A Man of Honor)
- Graf Petöfy, 1884
- Unterm Birnbaum, 1885 (translated as Under the Pear Tree)
- Cécile (novel), 1887
- Irrungen, Wirrungen. Berliner Roman 1888 (translated as On Tangled Paths, 2010, A Suitable Match, 1968, and Trials and Tribulations, 1917)
- Fünf Schlösser. Altes und Neues aus Mark Brandenburg, 1889
- Stine, 1890
- Quitt, 1891
- Unwiederbringlich, 1891 (translated as Irretrievable, Beyond Recall and No Way Back)
- Frau Jenny Treibel, 1892 (translated as Jenny Treibel)
- Meine Kinderjahre, 1894
- Effi Briest, 1894–95 (serialized in Deutsche Rundschau); 1895 (in book form)
- Die Poggenpuhls, 1896 (translated as The Poggenpuhl Family)
- Der Stechlin, 1898 (translated as The Stechlin)
- Mathilde Möhring, 1906.

== Poems ==
- Balladen, 1861
- Archibald Douglas
- Die Brück' am Tay (English translation, Wikisource (German))
- John Maynard
- Herr von Ribbeck auf Ribbeck im Havelland (translated as Nick Ribbeck at Ribbeck in Havelland)
- Aber es bleibt auf dem alten Fleck
- Ausgang
- Gorm Grymme
- Das Trauerspiel von Afghanistan (English translation)
- Wo Bismarck Liegen Soll
- Kaiser Friedrich III.
- Jung-Bismarck
- Jakobitenlieder
- Märkische Reime

== See also ==
- Statue of Theodor Fontane, Tiergarten, Berlin

== Sources ==
- Craig, Gordon, Theodor Fontane: Literature and History in the Bismarck Reich, New York: Oxford University Press, 1999 ISBN 0-19-512837-0.
- Thomas Mann, "The Old Fontane," in: Essays of Three Decades (Knopf, 1947), 1910 essay.
- Daniel Mendelsohn, "Heroine Addict: What Theodor Fontane's Women Want", in: The New Yorker, 7 March 2011.
