= X v. Principal Secretary, Health and Family Welfare Department, Government of NCT of Delhi =

2022 Supreme Court judgment about abortion rights

- Court: Supreme Court of India
- Full case name: X v. Principal Secretary, Health and Family Welfare Department, Government of the National Capital Territory of Delhi & Anr
- Decided: September 29, 2022
- Citation: Civil Appeal 5802/2022; arising out of Special Leave Petition (Civil) 12612/2022

Case history
- Prior action: Appeal from order of the High Court of Delhi in Writ Petition (Civil) 10602/2022, decided 15 July 2022

Holding
- The expression "change of marital status" in Rule 3B(c) of the Medical Termination of Pregnancy Rules, 2003 should be purposively interpreted to include unmarried women whose relationship status has changed, thereby permitting them to terminate pregnancies between 20 and 24 weeks on grounds of mental health risk.

Case opinions
- Majority opinion by D. Y. Chandrachud; concurring opinions by Hima Kohli and P. S. Narasimha
- Decision by: D. Y. Chandrachud

Keywords
- Abortion in India, Reproductive autonomy, Marital rape, Constitution of India (Articles 14, 21)

X v. Principal Secretary, Health and Family Welfare Department, Govt. of NCT of Delhi & Anr., Civil Appeal 5802/2022, also known as X v. Principal Secretary, is a landmark decision of the Supreme Court of India that affirmed the right of all women, regardless of marital status, to obtain a safe and legal abortion up to 24 weeks of pregnancy.

The judgment, delivered by a three-judge bench of the Court on 29 September 2022, established that the distinction between married and unmarried women under the Medical Termination of Pregnancy Act, 1971 (MTP Act) and its rules was artificial, discriminatory, and a violation of Article 14 of the Constitution.

The judgement is noted for significantly expanding the scope of abortion rights in India.

== Background ==
=== MTP Act (1971) and Amendment in 2021 ===
Abortion has been legal in India under various circumstances with the introduction of the Medical Termination of Pregnancy (MTP) Act, 1971. The act was subsequently amended in 2021, with the MTP Amendment Act 2021, to introduce reforms such as increased gestational limits, grounds, and procedures to access abortion care.

One of the key issues in X v. Principal Secretary was Section 3(2) of the Act that allowed abortion in case of contraceptive failure. The original Act included an explanation noting that a pregnancy caused by the "failure of any device or method used by any married woman or her husband for the purpose of limiting the number of children" is presumed to cause grave injury to the woman's mental health, qualifying it as grounds for an abortion up to 20 weeks. In the MTP (Amendement) Act 2021, the language was revised to "any woman or her partner" to be more inclusive. Following publication of the Act the Government of India published updated "MTP Rules," to carry out the various provisions of the Act. (Note: G.S.R 730(E) – THE GAZETTE OF INDIA)

=== Delhi High Court judgement ===
The case came from a judgement of a Division Bench of the High Court of Delhi where the appellant, a woman from Manipur, was seeking interim relief from the court under the Section 3(2)(b) of the MTP Act to abort her 24-week-old pregnancy. The high court refused permission for an abortion on the grounds that Section 3(2)(b) "was inapplicable to the facts of the present case" and that "the appellant, being an unmarried woman, whose pregnancy arose out of a consensual relationship, was not covered" by any of the sub-clauses of Rule 3B of the MTP Rules for termination of pregnancy. As per the MTP Rules, only survivors of rape, minors, women whose marital status changed during pregnancy, mentally-ill women, or women with foetal malformation were allowed to terminate pregnancy up to 24 weeks. The appellant subsequently challenged the ruling to the Supreme Court.

== Judgement ==
On July 21, 2022, the Supreme Court issued an ad interim order allowing the woman to abort her pregnancy subject to approval by a medical board that "concludes that the fetus can be aborted without danger to the life of the petitioner." The court in its order stated that the High Court took an "unduly restrictive view" of Rule 3B(c): "the expression 'change of marital status' should be granted a purposive rather than a restrictive interpretation" and "[t]he expressions 'widowhood and divorce' need not be construed to be exhaustive of the category which precedes it."

The Supreme Court held in its final judgment that a purposive interpretation of the provisions must be adopted, that "there is no rationale for excluding unmarried or single women ... from the ambit of Rule 3B," and that a narrow interpretation "would render the provision discriminatory towards unmarried women" and violate Article 14 of the Constitution, which enshrines equality before the law and prohibits discrimination on grounds of religion, race, caste, sex, or place of birth. The court also held that "[t]he rights of reproductive autonomy, dignity, and privacy under Article 21 ["Protection of Life and Personal Liberty"] give an unmarried woman the right of choice on whether or not to bear a child, on a similar footing of a married woman."

The court also stated that "[i]n determining whether the continuation of the pregnancy would involve grave danger to the pregnant woman's physical or mental health, her actual or reasonably foreseeable environment may be taken into account." Moreover, "significant reliance ought to be placed on each woman's own estimation of whether she is in a position to continue and carry to term her pregnancy." The court held that registered medical practitioners could not apply "extra-legal conditions such as consent from the woman's family, documentary proofs, or judicial authorization" that have no basis in law.

Another significant observation made by the court was that for purposes of abortion, the terms "sexual assault" and "rape" in Rule 3B(a) include marital rape, which is otherwise excluded as a crime under section 375 of the Indian Penal Code (IPC). However, the court clarified that this does "not have the effect of striking down" the exception under the section or "changing the contours of the offence of rape as defined in the IPC" because a challenge to the provision is pending consideration before a different bench of the court, and the court would thus leave the constitutional validity to be decided in that or another appropriate proceeding.

== See also ==
- Abortion in India
- Women's health in India
- Adultery law in India
