= Adultery =

Type of extramarital sex

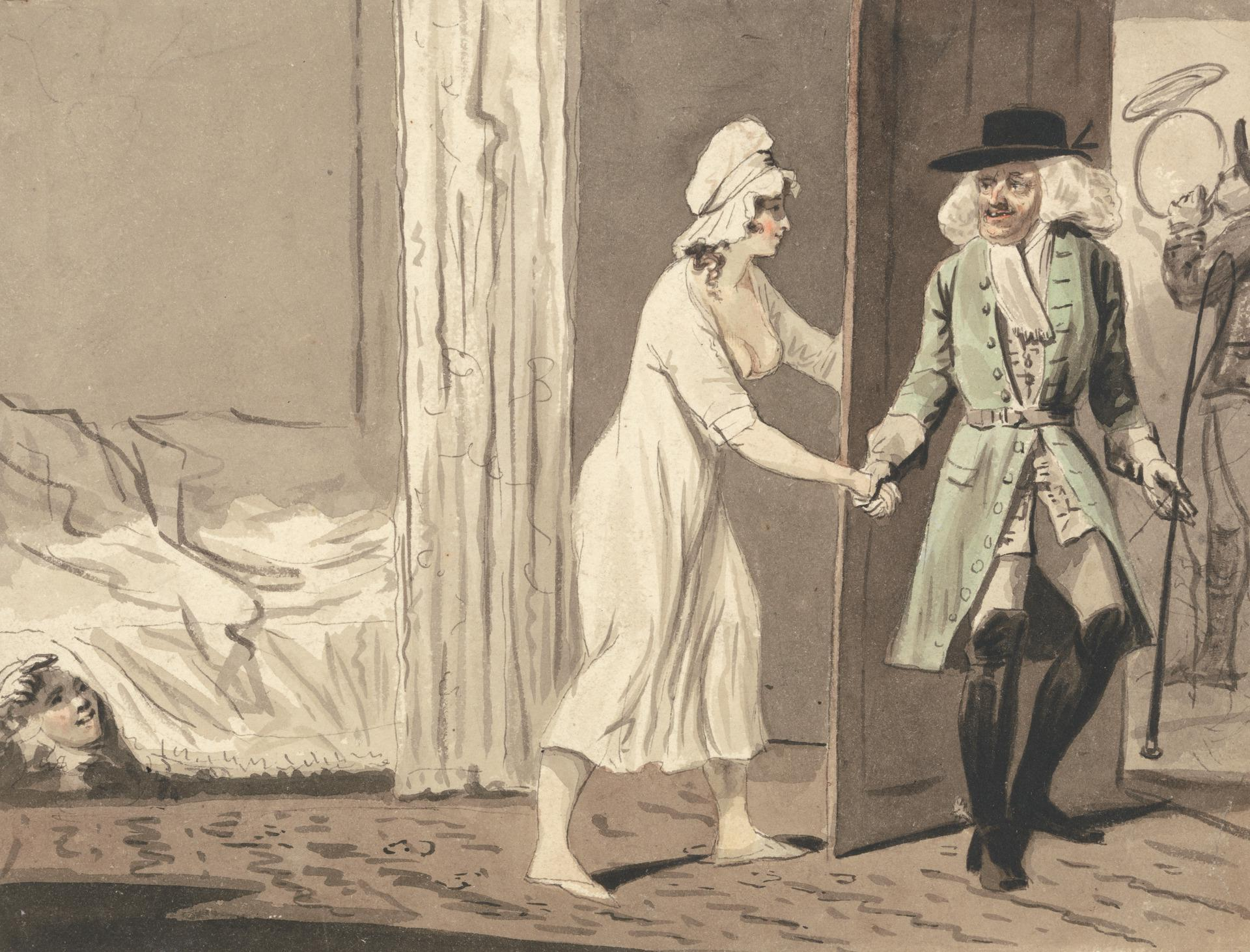
Illustration depicting an adulterous wife, circa 1800

Adultery is generally defined as extramarital sex that is or was considered objectionable on social, religious and moral grounds, and which often resulted in legal consequences. Although the sexual activities that can be described as adultery vary, as well as their consequences, the concept is found in many cultures and shares similarities in Judaism, Christianity and Islam. Adultery was and continues to be viewed by many societies as offensive to public morals, and as undermining the "marital" relationship.

Historically, many cultures considered adultery a sin and a very serious crime, sometimes subject to severe penalties, usually for the woman and sometimes for the man, with penalties including capital punishment, mutilation, or torture. In most Western countries during the 19th century, most direct criminal penalties have fallen into disfavor. Since the 20th century, criminal laws against adultery have become controversial, with most Western countries repealing adultery laws. In countries where adultery is still a criminal offense, punishments range from a fine to caning and even capital punishment.

Even in jurisdictions that have repealed adultery laws, adultery may still have legal consequences. For example, in jurisdictions with fault-based divorce laws, adultery almost always constitutes a ground for divorce and in some jurisdictions it may be considered in relation to custody of children. Even in jurisdictions with no-fault divorce, adultery may still be a factor in property settlement and the award or denial of alimony.

International organizations have called for the repeal of adultery laws, especially in the light of several high-profile stoning cases that took place in some countries. The head of the United Nations expert body charged with identifying ways to eliminate laws that discriminate against women or are discriminatory to them in terms of implementation or impact, Kamala Chandrakirana, has stated that: "Adultery must not be classified as a criminal offence at all". A joint statement by the United Nations Working Group on discrimination against women in law and in practice states that: "Adultery as a criminal offence violates women's human rights".

In Muslim countries that follow Sharia law for criminal justice, the punishment for adultery may be stoning. There are fifteen countries in which stoning is authorized as lawful punishment, though in recent times it has been legally carried out only in Iran and Somalia. Most countries where adultery is a crime are those where the dominant religion is Islam, and several Sub-Saharan African Christian-majority countries, but also in the Philippines and several U.S. states. In some jurisdictions, having sexual relations with the king's wife or the wife of his eldest son constitutes treason.

== Overview ==
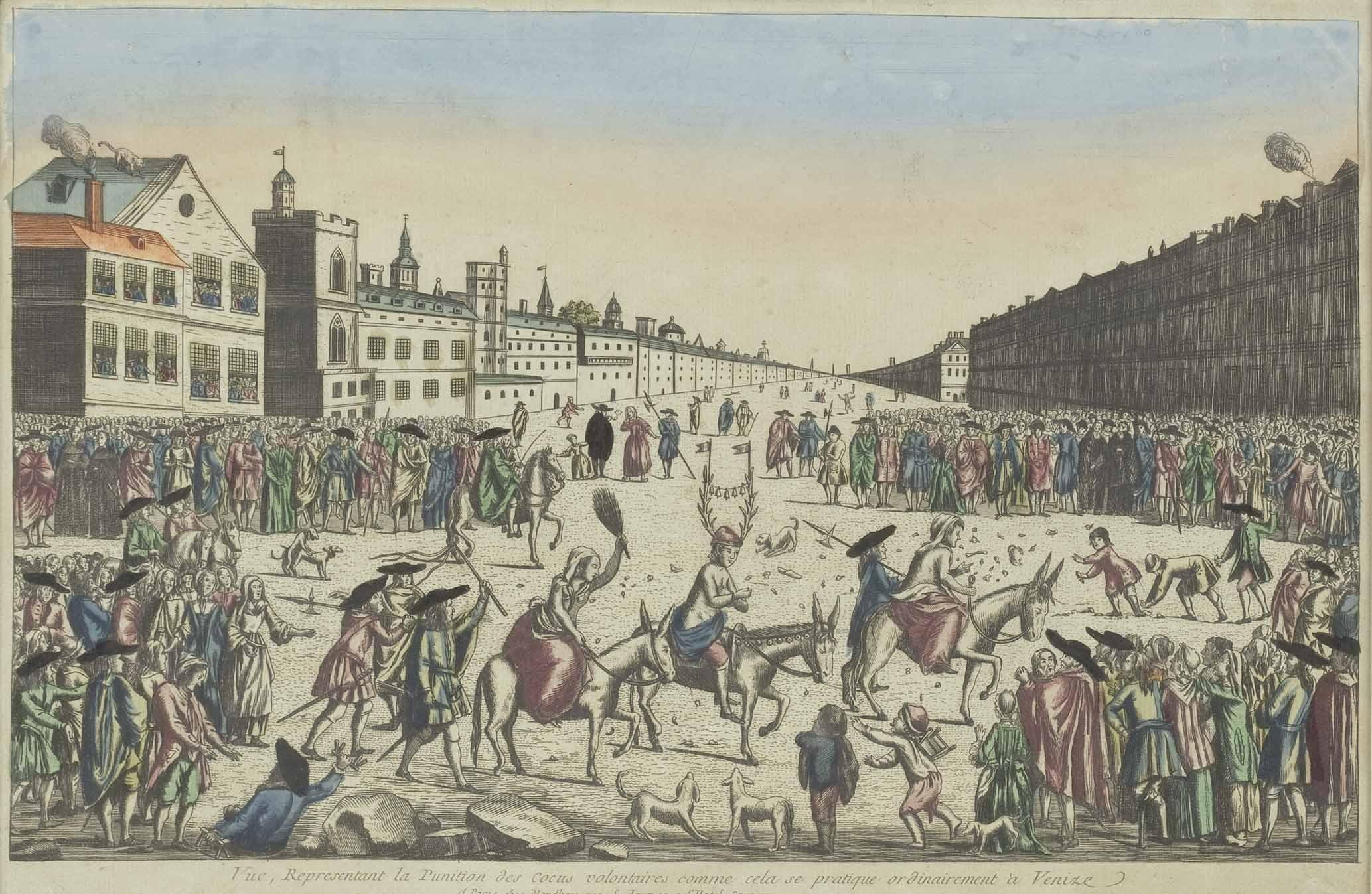
Public punishment of adulterers in Venice, 17th century

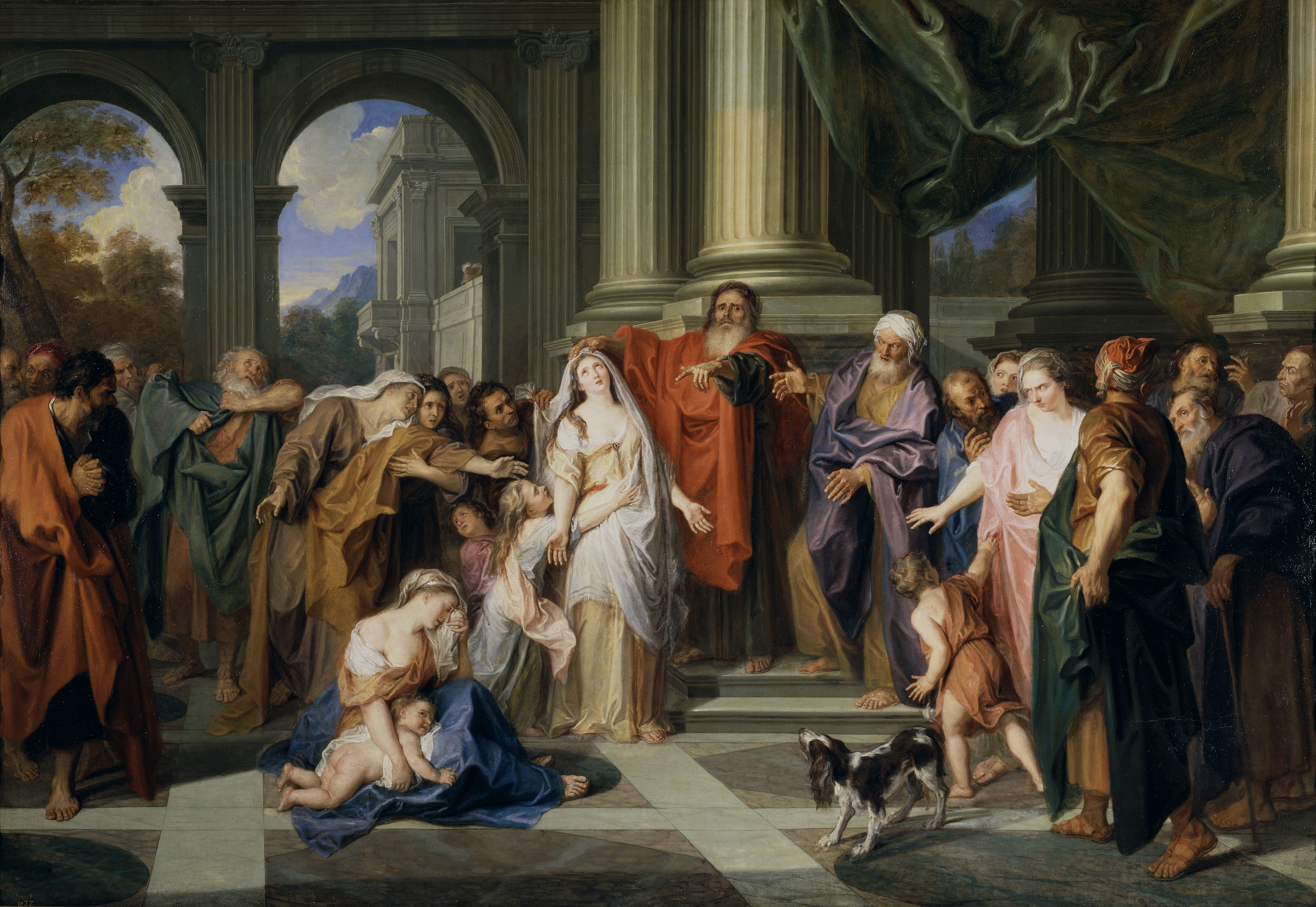
Susannah accused of adultery, by Antoine Coypel

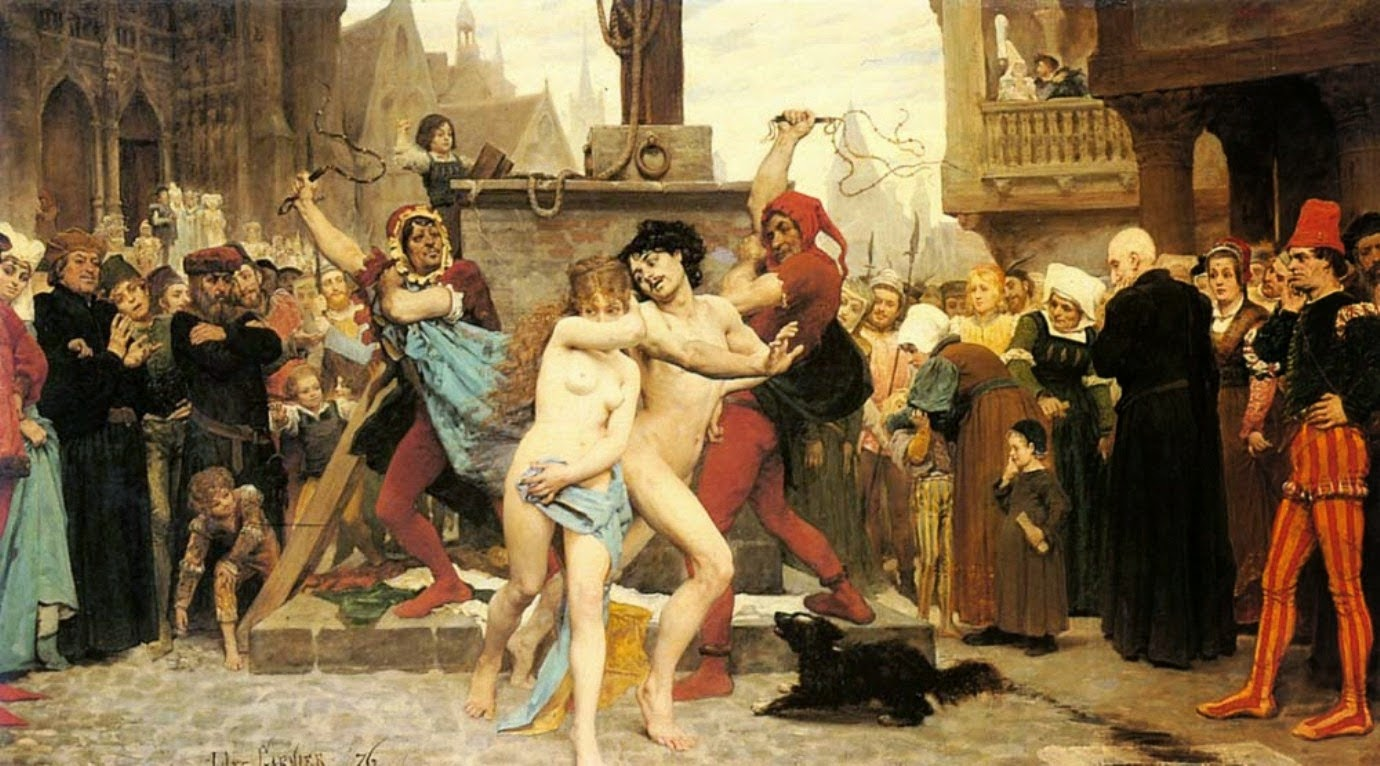
Le supplice des adultères, by Jules Arsène Garnier, showing two adulterers being punished

The term adultery refers to sexual acts between a married person and someone who is not their spouse. It may arise in a number of contexts. In criminal law, adultery was a criminal offence in many countries in the past, and is still a crime in some countries today. In family law, adultery may be a ground for divorce, with the legal definition of adultery being "physical contact with an alien and unlawful organ", while in some countries today, adultery is not in itself grounds for divorce. Extramarital sexual acts not fitting this definition are not "adultery" though they may constitute "unreasonable behavior", also a ground of divorce.

Another issue is the issue of paternity of a child. The application of the term to the act appears to arise from the idea that "criminal intercourse with a married woman ... tended to adulterate the issue [children] of an innocent husband ... and to expose him to support and provide for another man's [children]". Thus, the "purity" of the children of a marriage is corrupted, and the inheritance is altered.

In archaic law, there was a common law tort of criminal conversation arising from adultery, "conversation" being an archaic euphemism for sexual intercourse. It was a tort action brought by a husband against a third party ("the other man") who interfered with the marriage relationship.

Some adultery laws differentiate based on the sex of the participants, and as a result such laws are often seen as discriminatory, and in some jurisdictions they have been struck down by courts, usually on the basis that they discriminated against women.

The term adultery, rather than extramarital sex, implies a moral condemnation of the act; as such it is usually not a neutral term because it carries an implied judgment that the act is wrong.

Adultery refers to sexual relations which are not officially legitimized; for example it does not refer to having sexual intercourse with multiple partners in the case of polygamy (when a man is married to more than one wife at a time, called polygyny; or when a woman is married to more than one husband at a time, called polyandry).

== Definitions and legal constructs ==
In the traditional English common law, adultery was a felony. Although the legal definition of adultery differs in nearly every legal system, the common theme is sexual relations outside of marriage, in one form or another.

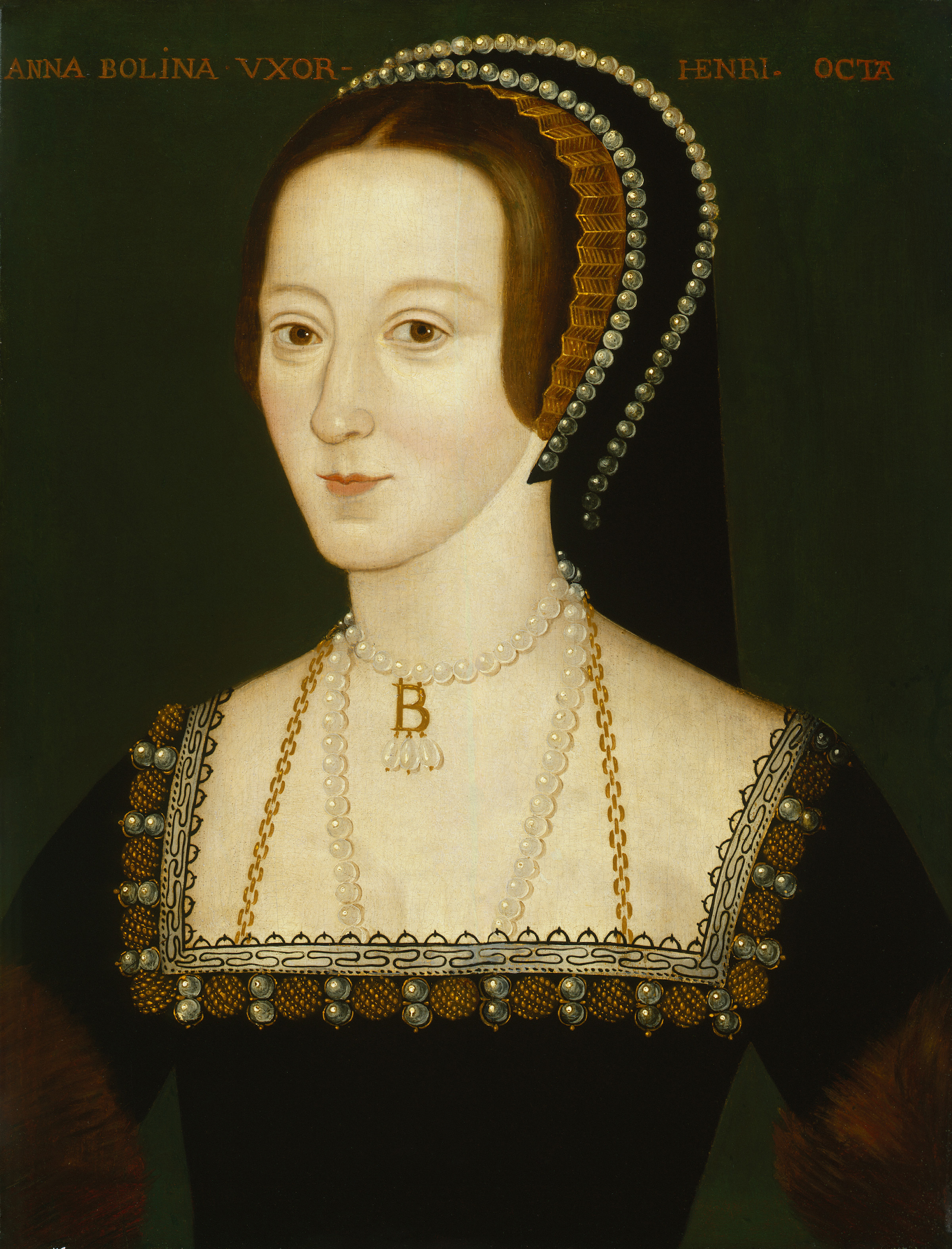
Anne Boleyn was found guilty of adultery and treason and executed in 1536. There is controversy among historians as to whether she had actually committed adultery.

Traditionally, many cultures, particularly Latin American ones, had strong double standards regarding male and female adultery, with the latter being seen as a much more serious violation.

Adultery involving a married woman and a man other than her husband was considered a very serious crime. In 1707, English Lord Chief Justice John Holt stated that a man having sexual relations with another man's wife was "the highest invasion of property" and claimed, in regard to the aggrieved husband, that "a man cannot receive a higher provocation" (in a case of murder or manslaughter).

The Encyclopedia of Diderot & d'Alembert, Vol. 1 (1751), also equated adultery to theft, writing that, "adultery is, after homicide, the most punishable of all crimes, because it is the most cruel of all thefts, and an outrage capable of inciting murders and the most deplorable excesses."

Legal definitions of adultery vary. For example, New York defines an adulterer as a person who "engages in sexual intercourse with another person at a time when he has a living spouse, or the other person has a living spouse." North Carolina defines adultery as occurring when any man and woman "lewdly and lasciviously associate, bed, and cohabit together." Minnesota law (repealed in 2023) provided: "when a married woman has sexual intercourse with a man other than her husband, whether married or not, both are guilty of adultery." In the 2003 New Hampshire Supreme Court case Blanchflower v. Blanchflower, it was held that female same-sex sexual relations did not constitute sexual intercourse, based on a 1961 definition from Webster's Third New International Dictionary; and thereby an accused wife in a divorce case was found not guilty of adultery. In 2001, Virginia prosecuted an attorney, John R. Bushey, for adultery, a case that ended in a guilty plea and a $125 fine. Adultery is against the governing law of the U.S. military.

In common-law countries, adultery was also known as criminal conversation. This became the name of the civil tort arising from adultery, being based upon compensation for the other spouse's injury. Criminal conversation was usually referred to by lawyers as crim. con., and was abolished in England in 1857, and the Republic of Ireland in 1976. Another tort, alienation of affection, arises when one spouse deserts the other for a third person. This act was also known as desertion, which was often a crime as well. A small number of jurisdictions still allow suits for criminal conversation and/or alienation of affection. In the United States, six states still maintain this tort.

A marriage in which both spouses agree ahead of time to accept sexual relations by either partner with others is sometimes referred to as an open marriage or the swinging lifestyle. Polyamory, meaning the practice, desire, or acceptance of intimate relationships that are not exclusive with respect to other sexual or intimate relationships, with knowledge and consent of everyone involved, sometimes involves such marriages. Swinging and open marriages are both a form of non-monogamy, and the spouses would not view the sexual relations as objectionable. However, irrespective of the stated views of the partners, extramarital relations could still be considered a crime in some legal jurisdictions which criminalize adultery.

In Canada, though the written definition in the Divorce Act refers to extramarital relations with someone of the opposite sex, a British Columbia judge used the Civil Marriage Act in a 2005 case to grant a woman a divorce from her husband who had cheated on her with another man, which the judge felt was equal reasoning to dissolve the union.

In England and Wales, case law restricts the definition of adultery to penetrative sexual intercourse between a man and a woman, no matter the gender of the spouses in the marriage. Infidelity with a person of the same gender can be grounds for a divorce as unreasonable behavior; this situation was discussed at length during debates on the Marriage (Same-Sex Couples) Bill. However, the practical effect of this ceased with the introduction of no-fault divorce in April 2022, which meant that unreasonable behavior ceased to be grounds for divorce.

In India, adultery was the sexual intercourse of a man with a married woman without the consent of her husband when such sexual intercourse did not amount to rape, and it was a non-cognizable, non-bailable criminal offence; the adultery law was overturned by the Supreme Court of India on 27 September 2018.

== Prevalence ==
Durex's Global Sex Survey found that worldwide 22% of people surveyed admitted to have had extramarital sex.

In the United States Alfred Kinsey found in his studies that 50% of males and 26% of females had extramarital sex at least once during their lifetime. Depending on studies, it was estimated that 22.7% of men and 11.6% of women, had extramarital sex. Other authors say that between 20% and 25% of Americans had sex with someone other than their spouse.

Three 1990s studies in the United States, using nationally representative samples, have found that about 10–15% of women and 20–25% of men admitted to having engaged in extramarital sex.

The Standard Cross-Cultural Sample described the occurrence of extramarital sex by gender in over 50 pre-industrial cultures. The occurrence of extramarital sex by men is described as "universal" in 6 cultures, "moderate" in 29 cultures, "occasional" in 6 cultures, and "uncommon" in 10 cultures. The occurrence of extramarital sex by women is described as "universal" in 6 cultures, "moderate" in 23 cultures, "occasional" in 9 cultures, and "uncommon" in 15 cultures.

== Cultural and religious traditions ==
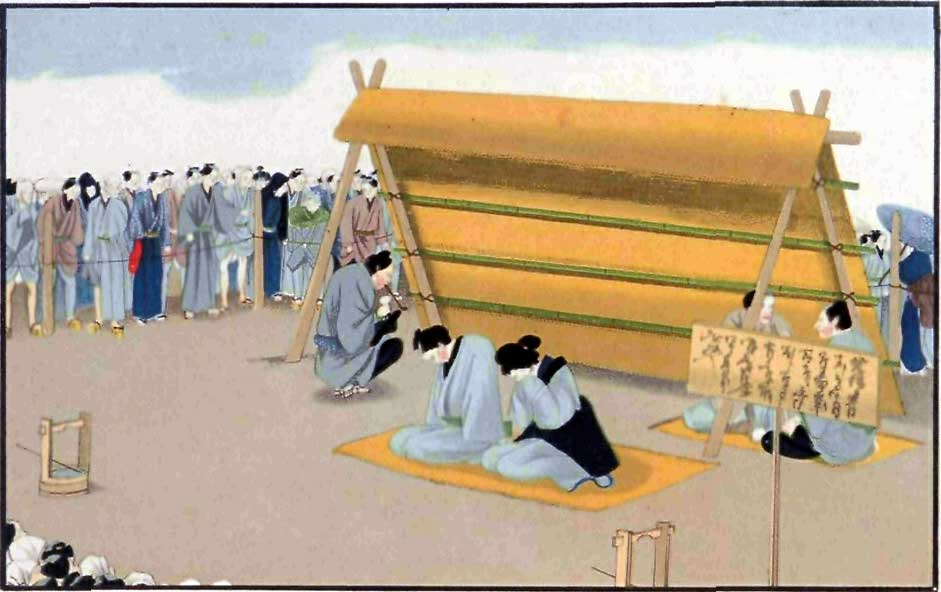
Man and woman undergoing public exposure for adultery in Japan, around 1860

=== Greco-Roman world ===
In the Greco-Roman world, there were stringent laws against adultery, but these applied to sexual intercourse with a married woman. In the early Roman Law, the jus tori belonged to the husband. It was therefore not illegal for a husband to have sex with a slave or an unmarried woman.

The Roman husband often took advantage of his legal immunity. Thus historian Spartianus said that Verus, the imperial colleague of Marcus Aurelius, did not hesitate to declare to his reproaching wife: "Uxor enim dignitatis nomen est, non voluptatis." ('Wife' connotes rank, not sexual pleasure, or more literally "Wife is the name of dignity, not bliss").

Later in Roman history, as William E.H. Lecky has shown, the idea that the husband owed a fidelity similar to that demanded of the wife must have gained ground, at least in theory. Lecky gathers from the legal maxim of Ulpian: "It seems most unfair for a man to require from a wife the chastity he does not himself practice".

According to Plutarch, the lending of wives practiced among some people was also encouraged by Lycurgus, though from a motive other than that which actuated the practice (Plutarch, Lycurgus, XXIX). The recognized license of the Greek husband may be seen in the following passage of the pseudo-Demosthenic Oration Against Neaera:

We keep mistresses for our pleasures, concubines for constant attendance, and wives to bear us legitimate children and to be our faithful housekeepers. Yet, because of the wrong done to the husband only, the Athenian lawgiver Solon allowed any man to kill an adulterer whom he had taken in the act. (Plutarch, Solon)

The Roman Lex Julia, Lex Iulia de Adulteriis Coercendis (17 BC), punished adultery with banishment. The two guilty parties were sent to different islands ("dummodo in diversas insulas relegentur"), and part of their property was confiscated. Fathers were permitted to kill daughters and their partners in adultery. Husbands could kill the partners under certain circumstances and were required to divorce adulterous wives.

=== Abrahamic religions ===
==== Biblical sources ====
Both Judaism and Christianity base their injunction against adultery on passages in the Hebrew Bible (Old Testament in Christianity), which firstly prohibits adultery in the Seventh Commandment: "Thou shalt not commit adultery." (Exodus 20:12). However, Judaism and Christianity differ on what actually constitutes adultery.

Leviticus 20:10 defines what constitutes adultery in the Hebrew Bible, and it also prescribes the punishment as capital punishment. In this verse, and in the Jewish tradition, adultery consists of sexual intercourse between a man and a married woman who is not his lawful wife:

And the man that committeth adultery with another man's wife, even he that committeth adultery with his neighbour's wife, the adulterer and the adulteress shall surely be put to death.

Thus, according to the Hebrew Bible, adultery is not committed if the female participant is unmarried (unless she is betrothed to be married), while the marital status of the male participant is irrelevant (he himself could be married to another woman or unmarried).

If a married woman was raped by a man who is not her husband, only the rapist is punished for adultery. The victim is not punished: as the Bible declares, "this matter is similar to when a man rises up against his fellow and murders him"; just as a murder victim is not guilty of murder, a rape victim is not guilty of adultery.

Michael Coogan writes that according to the text wives are the property of their husband, marriage meaning transfer of property (from father to husband), and adultery is violating the property right of the husband. However, in contrast to other ancient Near Eastern law collections which treat adultery as an offense against the husband alone, and allow the husband to waive or mitigate the punishment, Biblical law allows no such mitigation, on the grounds that God as well as the husband is offended by adultery, and an offense against God cannot be forgiven by man. In addition, Coogan's book was criticized by Phyllis Trible, who argues that that patriarchy was not decreed, but only described by God. She claims that Paul the Apostle made the same mistake as Coogan.

David's sexual intercourse with Bathsheba, the wife of Uriah, is described by the Bible as a "sin" whose punishment included the ravishment of David's own wives. According to Jennifer Wright Knust, David's act was adultery only according to the spirit and not the letter of the law, because Uriah was non-Jewish, and (according to Knust) the Biblical codes only technically applied to Israelites. However, according to Jacob Milgrom, Jews and resident foreigners received equal protection under Biblical law. In any case, according to the Babylonian Talmud, Uriah was indeed Jewish and wrote a provisional bill of divorce prior to going out to war, specifying that if he fell in battle, the divorce would take effect from the time the writ was issued.

==== Christianity ====
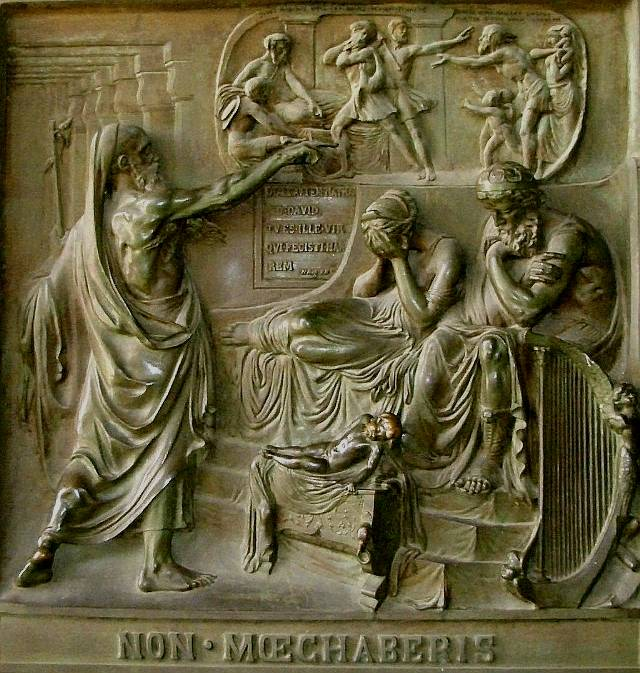
'Thou shalt not commit adultery' (Nathan confronts David); bronze bas-relief on the door of the La Madeleine, Paris, Paris.

Adultery is considered immoral by Christians and a sin, based primarily on passages like Exodus 20:14 and 1 Corinthians 6:9–10. Although 1 Corinthians 6:11 does say that "and that is what some of you were. But you were washed", it still acknowledges adultery to be immoral and a sin.

Catholicism ties fornication with breaking the sixth commandment in its Catechism.

Until a few decades ago, adultery was a criminal offense in many countries where the dominant religion is Christianity, especially in Roman Catholic countries (for example, in Austria it was a criminal offense until 1997). Adultery was decriminalized in Chile in 1994, Argentina in 1995, Brazil in 2005 and Mexico in 2011, but in some predominantly Catholic countries, such as the Philippines, it remains illegal.

The Book of Mormon also prohibits adultery. For instance, Abinadi cites the Ten Commandments when he accuses King Noah's priests of sexual immorality. When Jesus Christ visits the Americas he reinforces the law and teaches them the higher law (also found in the New Testament):

Behold, it is written by them of old time, that thou shalt not commit adultery; but I say unto you, that whosoever looketh on a woman, to lust after her, hath committed adultery already in his heart.

Some churches such as the Church of Jesus Christ of Latter-day Saints have interpreted "adultery" to include all sexual relationships outside of marriage, regardless of the marital status of the participants. Book of Mormon prophets and civil leaders often list adultery as an illegal activity along with murder, robbing, and stealing.

==== Judaism ====
Though Leviticus 20:10 prescribes the death penalty for adultery, the legal procedural requirements were very exacting and required the testimony of two eyewitnesses of good character for conviction. The defendant also must have been warned immediately before performing the act. A death sentence could be issued only during the period when the Holy Temple stood, and only so long as the Sanhedrin court convened in its chamber within the Temple complex. Technically, therefore, no death penalty can now be applied.

The death penalty for adultery was generally strangulation, except in the case of a woman who was the daughter of a Kohen, which was specifically mentioned in Scripture as the penalty of burning (pouring molten lead down the throat), or a woman who was betrothed but not married, in which case the punishment for both man and woman was stoning.

At the civil level, Jewish law (halakha) forbids a man to continue living with an adulterous wife, and he is obliged to divorce her. Also, an adulteress is not permitted to marry the adulterer, but (to avoid any doubt as to her status as being free to marry another or that of her children) many authorities say he must give her a divorce as if they were married.

According to Judaism, the Seven laws of Noah apply to all of humankind; these laws prohibit adultery to non-Jews as well as Jews.

The extramarital intercourse of a married man is not in itself considered a crime in biblical or later Jewish law; it was considered akin to polygyny, which was permitted. Similarly, sexual intercourse between an unmarried man and a woman who was neither married nor betrothed was not considered adultery. This concept of adultery stems from the economic custom of Israelite marriage whereby the husband has an exclusive right to his wife, whereas the wife, as the husband's possession, did not have an exclusive right to her husband.

In Jesus's time, the real punishment for adultery was divorce, not the death penalty.

==== Islam ====
Zina' is an Arabic term for illegal intercourse, premarital or extramarital. Various conditions and punishments have been attributed to adultery. Under Islamic law, adultery in general is sexual intercourse by a person (whether man or woman) with someone to whom they are not married. Adultery is a violation of the marital contract and one of the major sins condemned by God in the Qur'an:

Qur'anic verses prohibiting adultery include:

Do not go near adultery. It is truly a shameful deed and an evil way.

— Surah Al-Isra 17:32

Say, "My Lord has only forbidden open and secret indecencies, sinfulness, unjust aggression, associating ˹others˺ with Allah ˹in worship˺—a practice He has never authorized—and attributing to Allah what you do not know."

— Surah Al-A'raf 7:33

Punishments are reserved to the legal authorities and false accusations are to be punished severely. It has been said that these legal procedural requirements were instituted to protect women from slander and false accusations: i.e. four witnesses of good character are required for conviction, who were present at that time and saw the deed taking place; and if they saw it they were not of good moral character, as they were looking at naked adults; thus no one can be convicted of adultery unless both of the accused also agree and give their confession under oath four times.

According to a hadith attributed to Muhammad, an unmarried person who commits adultery or fornication is punished by flogging 100 times; a married person will then be stoned to death. A survey conducted by the Pew Research Center found support for stoning as a punishment for adultery mostly in Arab countries; it was supported in Egypt (82% of respondents in favor of the punishment) and Jordan (70% in favor), as well as Pakistan (82% favor), whereas in Nigeria (56% in favor) and in Indonesia (42% in favor) opinion is more divided, perhaps due to diverging traditions and differing interpretations of Sharia.

=== Eastern religions ===
==== Hinduism ====
The Hindu Sanskrit texts present a range of views on adultery, offering widely differing positions. The hymn 4.5.5 of the Rigveda calls adultery pāpa (evil, sin). Other Vedic texts call adultery a sin, just like murder, incest, anger, evil thoughts and trickery. The Vedic texts, including the Rigveda, the Atharvaveda and the Upanishads, also acknowledge the existence of male lovers and female lovers as a basic fact of human life, followed by the recommendation that one should avoid such extramarital sex during certain ritual occasions (yajna). The Rigveda describes a woman's eagerness to meet her lover, and one hymn asks the gods to protect the embryo of a pregnant wife as she sleeps with her husband and other lovers.

Adultery and similar offenses are discussed under one of the eighteen vivādapadas (titles of laws) in the dharma literature of Hinduism. These texts generally condemn adultery, with some exceptions involving consensual sex and niyoga (levirate conception) in order to produce an heir. According to Apastamba Dharmasutra, the earliest dated Hindu law text, cross-varna adultery is a punishable crime, where the man receives a far more severe punishment than the woman. In Gautama Dharmasutra, the adulterous woman is liable to harsh punishment for the cross-class adultery. While Gautama Dharmasutra reserves the punishment in cases of cross-class adultery, it seems to have been generalized by Vishnu Dharmasastra and Manusmiriti. The recommended punishments in the text also vary between these texts.

The Manusmriti, also known as the Laws of Manu, deals with this in greater detail. Verse 4.134 declares adultery to be a heinous offense. The Manusmriti does not include adultery as a "grievous sin", but includes it as a "secondary sin" that leads to a loss of caste. Intent and consent are a elements that determine the appropriate punishment. Rape is not considered adultery for the woman, while the rapist is punished severely. Lesser punishment is recommended for consensual adulterous sex. Manu recommends the death penalty for a man who rapes a virgin. Other penalties range from fines and head-shaving to the loss of a limb, depending on the relative social status of those involved. In verses 8.362-363, the author states that sexual relations with the wife of traveling performer is not a sin, and reduces the penalty to a small fine. Verse 5.152 of says that a woman must constantly worship her husband as a god and be completely faithful even if he commits adultery. Although the Manusmrti recommends sexual fidelity in marriage, it also accepts that adulterous relationships happen and that children are born from such unions. According to Manu, a child conceived through adultery should belong to its mother's husband and not to its biological father.

Other dharmasastra texts describe adultery as a punishable crime but offer differing details. According to Naradasmriti, the term adultery in is not confined to the relationship of a married man with another man's wife. It includes sex with any woman who is protected by another man, including wives, daughters, other relatives, and servants. Adultery is not a punishable offence for a man if "the woman's husband has abandoned her because she is wicked, or he is eunuch, or of a man who does not care, provided the wife initiates it of her own volition". Adultery is not a punishable offence if a married man engages in intercourse with woman who doesn't belong to other man and is not a Brahmin, provided the woman is not of higher caste than the man. Brihaspati-smriti mention, among other things, adulterous local customs in ancient India and then states, "for such practices these (people) incur neither penance nor secular punishment". Kautilya's Arthashastra includes an exemption that in case the husband forgives his adulterous wife, the woman and her lover should be set free. If the offended husband does not forgive, the Arthashastra recommends the adulterous woman's nose and ears be cut off, while her lover be executed.

In Kamasutra, which is not a religious text like Vedas or Puranas but an ancient text on love and sex, Vatsyayana discusses adultery and devotes "not less than fifteen sutras (1.5.6–20) to enumerating the reasons (karana) for which a man is allowed to seduce a married woman". According to Wendy Doniger, the Kamasutra teaches adulterous sexual liaison as a means for a man to predispose the involved woman in assisting him, working against his enemies and facilitating his successes. It also explains the many signs and reasons a woman wants to enter into an adulterous relationship and when she does not want to commit adultery. The Kamasutra teaches strategies to engage in adulterous relationships, but concludes its chapter on sexual liaison stating that one should not commit adultery because adultery pleases only one of two sides in a marriage, hurts the other, it goes against both dharma and artha.

According to Werner Menski, the Sanskrit texts take "widely different positions on adultery", with some considering it a minor offense that can be addressed with penance, but others treat it as a severe offense that depending on the caste deserves the death penalty for the man or the woman. According to Ramanathan and Weerakoon, in Hinduism, the sexual matters are left to the judgment of those involved and not a matter to be imposed through law.

According to Carl Olsen, the classical Hindu society considered adultery as a sexual transgression but treated it with a degree of tolerance. It is described as a minor transgression in Naradasmriti and other texts, one that a sincere penance could atone. Penance is also recommended to a married person who does not actually commit adultery, but carries adulterous thoughts for someone else or is thinking of committing adultery.

Other Hindu texts present a more complex model of behavior and mythology where gods commit adultery for various reasons. For example, Krishna commits adultery and the Bhagavata Purana justifies it as something to be expected when Vishnu took a human form, just like sages become uncontrolled. According to Tracy Coleman, Radha and other gopis are indeed lovers of Krishna, but this is prema or "selfless, true love" and not carnal craving. In Hindu texts, this relationship between gopis and Krishna involves secret nightly rendezvous. Some texts state it to be divine adultery, others as a symbolism of spiritual dedication and religious value. The example of Krishna's adulterous behavior has been used by Sahajiyas Hindus of Bengal to justify their own behavior that is contrary to the mainstream Hindu norm, according to Doniger. Other Hindu texts state that Krishna's adultery is not a license for other men to do the same, in the same way that men should not drink poison just because Rudra-Shiva drank poison during the Samudra Manthan. A similar teaching is found in Mahayana Buddhism, states Doniger.

The Linga Purana indicates that sexual hospitality existed in ancient India. The sage Sudarshana, asks his wife Oghavati to please their guests in this way. One day, he comes home while she is having sex with a mendicant who visits their house. Sudarshana tells them to continue. The mendicant turns out to be Dharma, the lord of righteous conduct, who blesses the couple for their upholding of social law.

==== Buddhism ====
Buddhist texts such as Digha Nikāya describe adultery as a form of sexual wrongdoing that is one link in a chain of immorality and misery. According to Wendy Doniger, this view of adultery as evil is postulated in early Buddhist texts as having originated from greed in a previous life. This idea combines Hindu and Buddhist thoughts then prevalent. Sentient beings without body, state the canonical texts, are reborn on earth due to their greed and craving, some people become beautiful and some ugly, some become men and some women. The ugly envy the beautiful and this triggers the ugly to commit adultery with the wives of the beautiful. Like in Hindu mythology, states Doniger, Buddhist texts explain adultery as a result from sexual craving; it initiates a degenerative process.

Buddhism considers celibacy as the monastic ideal. For he who feels that he cannot live in celibacy, it recommends that he never commit adultery with another's wife. Engaging in sex outside of marriage, with the wife of another man, with a girl who is engaged to be married, or a girl protected by her relatives (father or brother), or extramarital sex with prostitutes, ultimately causes suffering to other human beings and oneself. It should be avoided, state the Buddhist canonical texts.

Buddhist Pali texts narrate legends where the Buddha explains the karmic consequences of adultery. For example, states Robert Goldman, one such story is of Thera Soreyya. Buddha states in the Soreyya story that "men who commit adultery suffer hell for hundreds of thousands of years after rebirth, then are reborn a hundred successive times as women on earth, must earn merit by "utter devotion to their husbands" in these lives, before they can be reborn again as men to pursue a monastic life and liberation from samsara.

There are some differences between the Buddhist texts and the Hindu texts on the identification and consequences of adultery. According to José Ignacio Cabezón, for example, the Hindu text Naradasmriti considers consensual extra-marital sex between a man and a woman in certain circumstances (such as if the husband has abandoned the woman) as not a punishable crime, but the Buddhist texts "nowhere exculpate" any adulterous relationship. The term adultery in Naradasmriti is broader in scope than the one in Buddhist sources. In the text, various acts such as secret meetings, exchange of messages and gifts, "inappropriate touching" and a false accusation of adultery, are deemed adulterous, while Buddhist texts do not recognize these acts under adultery. Later texts such as the Dhammapada, Pancasiksanusamsa Sutra and a few Mahayana sutras state that "heedless man who runs after other men's wife" acquire demerit, blame, discomfort and are reborn in hell. Other Buddhist texts make no mention of legal punishments for adultery.

=== Other historical practices ===
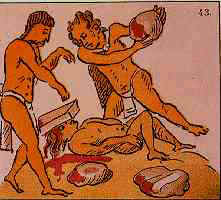
An Aztec adulterer being stoned to death; Florentine Codex

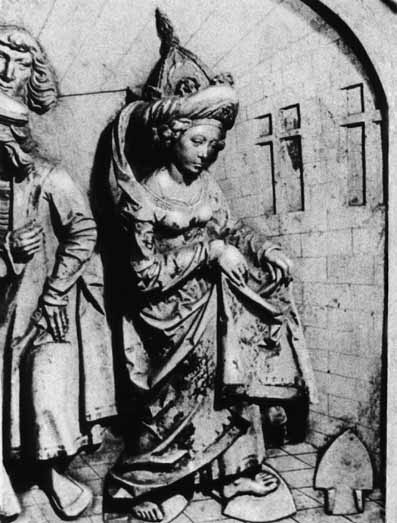
According to legend, after being accused of adultery, Cunigunde of Luxembourg proved her innocence by walking over red-hot ploughshares.

In some Native American cultures, severe penalties could be imposed on an adulterous wife by her husband. In many instances she was made to endure a bodily mutilation which would, in the mind of the aggrieved husband, prevent her from ever being a temptation to other men again. Among the Aztecs, wives caught in adultery were occasionally impaled, although the more usual punishment was to be stoned to death.

The Code of Hammurabi, a well-preserved Babylonian law code of ancient Mesopotamia, dating back to about 1772 BC, provided drowning as punishment for adultery.

Amputation of the nose – rhinotomy – was a punishment for adultery among many civilizations, including ancient India, ancient Egypt, among Greeks and Romans, and in Byzantium and among the Arabs.

In the tenth century, the Arab explorer Ibn Fadlan noted that adultery was unknown among the pagan Oghuz Turks. Ibn Fadlan writes that "adultery is unknown among them; but whomsoever they find by his conduct that he is an adulterer, they tear him in two. This comes about so: they bring together the branches of two trees, tie him to the branches and then let both trees go, so that he is torn in two."

In medieval Europe, early Jewish law mandated stoning for an adulterous wife and her partner.

In England and its successor states, it has been high treason to engage in adultery with the King's wife, his eldest son's wife and his eldest unmarried daughter. The jurist Sir William Blackstone writes that "the plain intention of this law is to guard the Blood Royal from any suspicion of bastardy, whereby the succession to the Crown might be rendered dubious." Adultery was a serious issue when it came to succession to the crown. Philip IV of France had all three of his daughters-in-law imprisoned, two (Margaret of Burgundy and Blanche of Burgundy) on the grounds of adultery and the third (Joan of Burgundy) for being aware of their adulterous behaviour. The two brothers accused of being lovers of the king's daughters-in-law were executed immediately after being arrested. The wife of Philip IV's eldest son bore a daughter, the future Joan II of Navarre, whose paternity and succession rights were disputed all her life.

The christianization of Europe came to mean that, in theory, and unlike with the Romans, there was supposed to be a single sexual standard, where adultery was a sin and against the teachings of the church, regardless of the sex of those involved. In practice, however, the church seemed to have accepted the traditional double standard which punished the adultery of the wife more harshly than that of the husband. Among Germanic tribes, each tribe had its own laws for adultery, and many of them allowed the husband to "take the law in his hands" and commit acts of violence against a wife caught committing adultery. In the Middle Ages, adultery in Vienna was punishable by death through impalement. Austria was one of the last Western countries to decriminalize adultery, in 1997.

The Encyclopedia of Diderot & d'Alembert, Vol. 1 (1751) noted the legal double standard from that period, it wrote:

"Furthermore, although the husband who violates conjugal trust is guilty as well as the woman, it is not permitted for her to accuse him, nor to pursue him because of this crime".

== Adultery and the law ==
Historically, many cultures considered adultery a very serious crime, some subject to severe punishment, especially for the married woman and sometimes for her sex partner, with penalties including capital punishment, mutilation, or torture. Such punishments have gradually fallen into disfavor, especially in Western countries from the 19th century. In countries where adultery is still a criminal offense, punishments range from fines to caning and even capital punishment. Since the 20th century, such laws have become controversial, with most Western countries repealing them.

However, even in jurisdictions that have decriminalised adultery, adultery may still have legal consequences, particularly in jurisdictions with fault-based divorce laws, where adultery almost always constitutes a ground for divorce and may be a factor in property settlement, the custody of children, the denial of alimony, etc. Adultery is not a ground for divorce in jurisdictions which have adopted a no-fault divorce model, but may still be a factor in child custody and property disputes.

International organizations have called for the decriminalising of adultery, especially in the light of several high-profile stoning cases that have occurred in some countries. The head of the United Nations expert body charged with identifying ways to eliminate laws that discriminate against women or are discriminatory to them in terms of implementation or impact, Kamala Chandrakirana, has stated that: "Adultery must not be classified as a criminal offence at all". A joint statement by the United Nations Working Group on discrimination against women in law and in practice states that: "Adultery as a criminal offence violates women's human rights".

In Muslim countries that follow Sharia law for criminal justice, the punishment for adultery may be stoning. There are 15 countries in which stoning is authorized as lawful punishment, though in recent times it has been legally carried out only in Iran and Somalia. Most countries that criminalize adultery are those where the dominant religion is Islam, and several Sub-Saharan African Christian-majority countries, but there are some notable exceptions to this rule, namely, the Philippines and several U.S. states.

=== Punishment ===
In jurisdictions where adultery is illegal, punishments vary from fines (for example in the US state of Rhode Island) to caning in parts of Asia. In 15 countries the punishment includes stoning, although in recent times it has been legally enforced only in Iran and Somalia. Most stoning cases are the result of mob violence, and while technically illegal, no action is usually taken against perpetrators. Sometimes such stonings are ordered by informal village leaders who have de facto power in the community. Adultery may have consequences under civil law even in countries where it is not outlawed by the criminal law. For instance it may constitute fault in countries where the divorce law is fault based or it may be a ground for tort.

In some jurisdictions, the "intruder" (the third party) is punished, rather than the adulterous spouse. For instance art 266 of the Penal Code of South Sudan reads: "Whoever, has consensual sexual intercourse with a man or woman who is and whom he or she has reason to believe to be the spouse of another person, commits the offence of adultery [...]". Similarly, under the adultery law in India (Section 497 of the Indian Penal Code, until overturned by the Supreme Court in 2018) it was a criminal offense for a man to have consensual sexual intercourse with a married woman, without the consent of her husband (no party was criminally punished in case of intercourse between a married man and an unmarried woman).

=== Legal issues regarding paternity ===
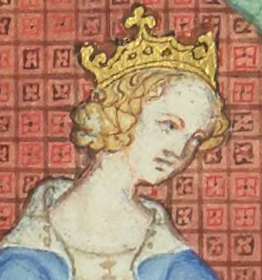
Joan II of Navarre – her paternity and succession rights were disputed her whole life because her mother Margaret of Burgundy was claimed to have committed adultery.

Historically, paternity of children born out of adultery has been seen as a major issue. Modern advances such as reliable contraception and paternity testing have changed the situation (in Western countries). Most countries nevertheless have a legal presumption that a woman's husband is the father of her children who were born during that marriage. Although this is often merely a rebuttable presumption, many jurisdictions have laws which restrict the possibility of legal rebuttal (for instance by creating a legal time limit during which paternity may be challenged – such as a certain number of years from the birth of the child). Establishing correct paternity may have major legal implications, for instance in regard to inheritance.

Children born out of adultery suffered, until recently, adverse legal and social consequences. In France, for instance, a law that stated that the inheritance rights of a child born under such circumstances were, on the part of the married parent, half of what they would have been under ordinary circumstances, remained in force until 2001, when France was forced to change it by a ruling of the European Court of Human Rights (ECtHR) (and in 2013, the ECtHR also ruled that the new 2001 regulations must be also applied to children born before 2001).

There has been, in recent years, a trend of legally favoring the right to a relation between the child and its biological father, rather than preserving the appearances of the 'social' family. In 2010, the ECtHR ruled in favor of a German man who had fathered twins with a married woman, granting him right of contact with the twins, despite the fact that the mother and her husband had forbidden him from seeing the children.

=== Criticism of adultery laws ===
Laws against adultery have been named as invasive and incompatible with principles of limited government. Much of the criticism comes from libertarianism, the consensus among whose adherents is that government must not intrude into daily personal lives and that such disputes are to be settled privately rather than prosecuted and penalized by public entities. It is also argued that adultery laws are rooted in religious doctrines; which should not be the case for laws in a secular state.

Historically, in most cultures, laws against adultery were enacted only to prevent women—and not men—from having sexual relations with anyone other than their spouses, with adultery being often defined as sexual intercourse between a married woman and a man other than her husband. Among many cultures the penalty was—and to this day still is, as noted below—capital punishment. At the same time, men were free to maintain sexual relations with any women (polygyny) provided that the women did not already have husbands or "owners". Indeed, בעל (ba`al), Hebrew for husband, used throughout the Bible, is synonymous with owner. These laws were enacted in fear of cuckoldry and thus sexual jealousy. Many indigenous customs, such as female genital mutilation and even menstrual taboos, have been theorized to have originated as preventive measures against cuckolding. This arrangement has been deplored by many modern intellectuals.

Opponents of adultery laws argue that these laws maintain social norms which justify violence, discrimination and oppression of women; in the form of state sanctioned forms of violence such as stoning, flogging or hanging for adultery; or in the form of individual acts of violence committed against women by husbands or relatives, such as honor killings, crimes of passion, and beatings. UN Women has called for the decriminalization of adultery.

An argument against the criminal status of adultery is that the resources of the law enforcement are limited, and that they should be used carefully; by investing them in the investigation and prosecution of adultery (which is very difficult) the curbing of serious violent crimes may suffer.

Human rights organizations have stated that legislation on sexual crimes must be based on consent, and must recognize consent as central, and not trivialize its importance; doing otherwise can lead to legal, social or ethical abuses. Amnesty International, when condemning stoning legislation that targets adultery, among other acts, has referred to "acts which should never be criminalized in the first place, including consensual sexual relations between adults". Salil Shetty, Amnesty International's Secretary General, said: "It is unbelievable that in the twenty-first century some countries are condoning child marriage and marital rape while others are outlawing abortion, sex outside marriage and same-sex sexual activity – even punishable by death." The My Body My Rights campaign has condemned state control over individual sexual and reproductive decisions; stating "All over the world, people are coerced, criminalized and discriminated against, simply for making choices about their bodies and their lives".

== Consequences ==
=== General ===
For various reasons, most couples who marry do so with the expectation of fidelity. Adultery is often seen as a breach of trust and of the commitment that had been made during the act of marriage. Adultery can be emotionally traumatic for both spouses and often results in divorce.

Adultery may lead to ostracization from certain religious or social groups.

Adultery can also lead to feelings of guilt and jealousy in the person with whom the affair is being committed. In some cases, this "third person" may encourage divorce (either openly or subtly). If the cheating spouse has hinted at divorce to continue the affair, the third person may feel deceived if that does not happen. They may simply withdraw with ongoing feelings of guilt, carry on an obsession with their lover, may choose to reveal the affair, or in rare cases, commit violence or other crimes.

There is correlation between divorces and children having struggles in later life.

=== Sexually transmitted infections ===
Like any sexual contact, extramarital sex opens the possibility of the introduction of sexually transmitted diseases (STDs) into a marriage. Since most married couples do not routinely use barrier contraceptives, STDs can be introduced to a marriage partner by a spouse engaging in unprotected extramarital sex. This can be a public health issue in regions of the world where STDs are common, but addressing this issue is very difficult due to legal and social barriers – to openly talk about this situation would mean to acknowledge that adultery (often) takes place, something that is taboo in certain cultures, especially those strongly influenced by religion. In addition, dealing with the issue of barrier contraception in marriage in cultures where women have very few rights is difficult: the power of women to negotiate safer sex (or sex in general) with their husbands is often limited. The World Health Organization (WHO) found that women in violent relations were at increased risk of HIV/AIDS, because they found it very difficult to negotiate safe sex with their partners, or to seek medical advice if they thought they have been infected.

== Violence ==
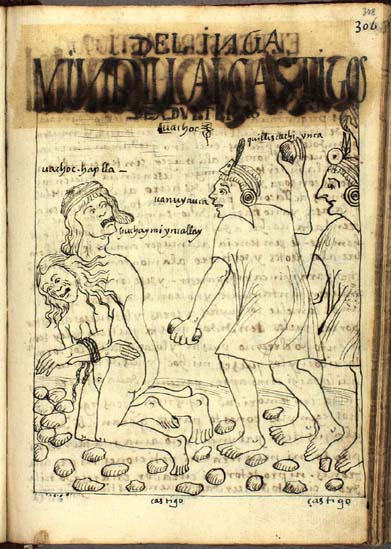
Inca woman and man to be stoned for adultery, by Huamán Poma

Historically, female adultery often resulted in extreme violence, including murder (of the woman, her lover, or both, committed by her husband). Today, domestic violence is outlawed in most countries.

Marital infidelity has been used, especially in the past, as a legal defence of provocation to a criminal charge, such as murder or assault. In some jurisdictions, the defence of provocation has been replaced by a partial defence or provocation or the behaviour of the victim can be invoked as a mitigating factor in sentencing.

In recent decades, feminists and women's rights organizations have worked to change laws and social norms which tolerate crimes of passion against women. UN Women has urged states to review legal defenses of passion and provocation, and other similar laws, to ensure that such laws do not lead to impunity in regard to violence against women, stating that "laws should clearly state that these defenses do not include or apply to crimes of "honour", adultery, or domestic assault or murder."

The Council of Europe Recommendation Rec(2002)5 of the Committee of Ministers to member states on the protection of women against violence states that member states should "preclude adultery as an excuse for violence within the family".

=== Honor killings ===
Honor killings are often connected to accusations of adultery. Most of the victims are women but men can also be victims. When an engaged or married woman commits adultery her fiance's family may seek to kill the male who committed the adultery. Honor killings continue to be practiced in some parts of the world, particularly (but not only) in parts of South Asia and the Middle East. Honor killings are treated leniently in some legal systems. Honor killings have also taken place in immigrant communities in Europe, Canada, and the U.S. In some parts of the world, honor killings enjoy considerable public support: in one survey, 33.4% of teenagers in Jordan's capital city, Amman, approved of honor killings. A survey in Diyarbakir, Turkey, found that, when asked the appropriate punishment for a woman who has committed adultery, 37% of respondents said she should be killed, while 21% said her nose or ears should be cut off.

Until 2009, in Syria, it was legal for a husband to kill or injure his wife or his female relatives caught in flagrante delicto committing adultery or other illegitimate sexual acts. The law has changed to allow the perpetrator to only "benefit from the attenuating circumstances, provided that he serves a prison term of no less than two years in the case of killing." Other articles also provide for reduced sentences. Article 192 states that a judge may opt for reduced punishments (such as short-term imprisonment) if the killing was done with an honorable intent. Article 242 says that a judge may reduce a sentence for murders that were done in rage and caused by an illegal act committed by the victim. In recent years, Jordan has amended its Criminal Code to modify its laws which used to offer a complete defense for honor killings.

According to the UN in 2002:

"The report of the Special Rapporteur ... concerning cultural practices in the family that are violent towards women (E/CN.4/2002/83), indicated that honour killings had been reported in Egypt, Jordan, Lebanon, Morocco, Pakistan, the Syrian Arab Republic, Turkey, Yemen, and other Mediterranean and Persian Gulf countries, and that they had also taken place in western countries such as France, Germany and the United Kingdom, within migrant communities."

=== Crimes of passion ===
Crimes of passion are often triggered by jealousy, and, according to Human Rights Watch, "have a similar dynamic [to honor killings] in that the women are killed by male family members and the crimes are perceived as excusable or understandable."

=== Stoning ===
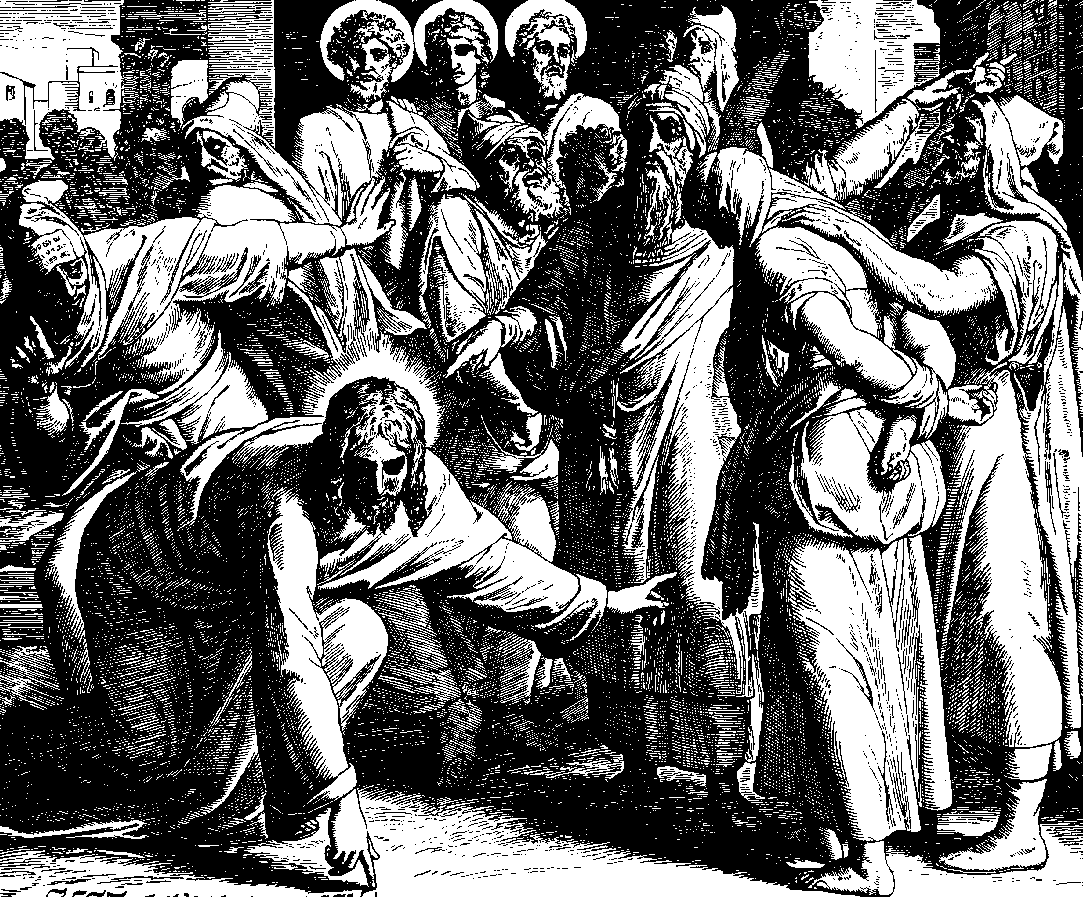
Jesus and the woman taken in adultery by Julius Schnorr von Karolsfeld, 1860, where Jesus said that the man who was without sin should throw the first stone.

Stoning, or lapidation, refers to a form of capital punishment whereby an organized group throws stones at an individual until the person dies, or the condemned person is pushed from a platform set high enough above a stone floor that the fall would probably result in instantaneous death.

Stoning continues to be practiced today, in parts of the world. Recently, several people have been sentenced to death by stoning after being accused of adultery in Iran, Somalia, Afghanistan, Sudan, Mali, and Pakistan by tribal courts.

=== Flogging ===
In some jurisdictions flogging is a punishment for adultery. There are also incidents of extrajudicial floggings, ordered by informal religious courts. In 2011, a 14-year-old girl in Bangladesh died after being publicly lashed, when she was accused of having an affair with a married man. Her punishment was ordered by villagers under Sharia law.

=== Violence between the partners of an adulterous couple ===
Married people who form relations with extramarital partners or people who engage in relations with partners married to somebody else may be subjected to violence in these relations. Because of the nature of adultery – illicit or illegal in many societies – this type of intimate partner violence may go underreported or may not be prosecuted when it is reported; and in some jurisdictions this type of violence is not covered by the specific domestic violence laws meant to protect persons in legitimate couples.

== In fiction ==
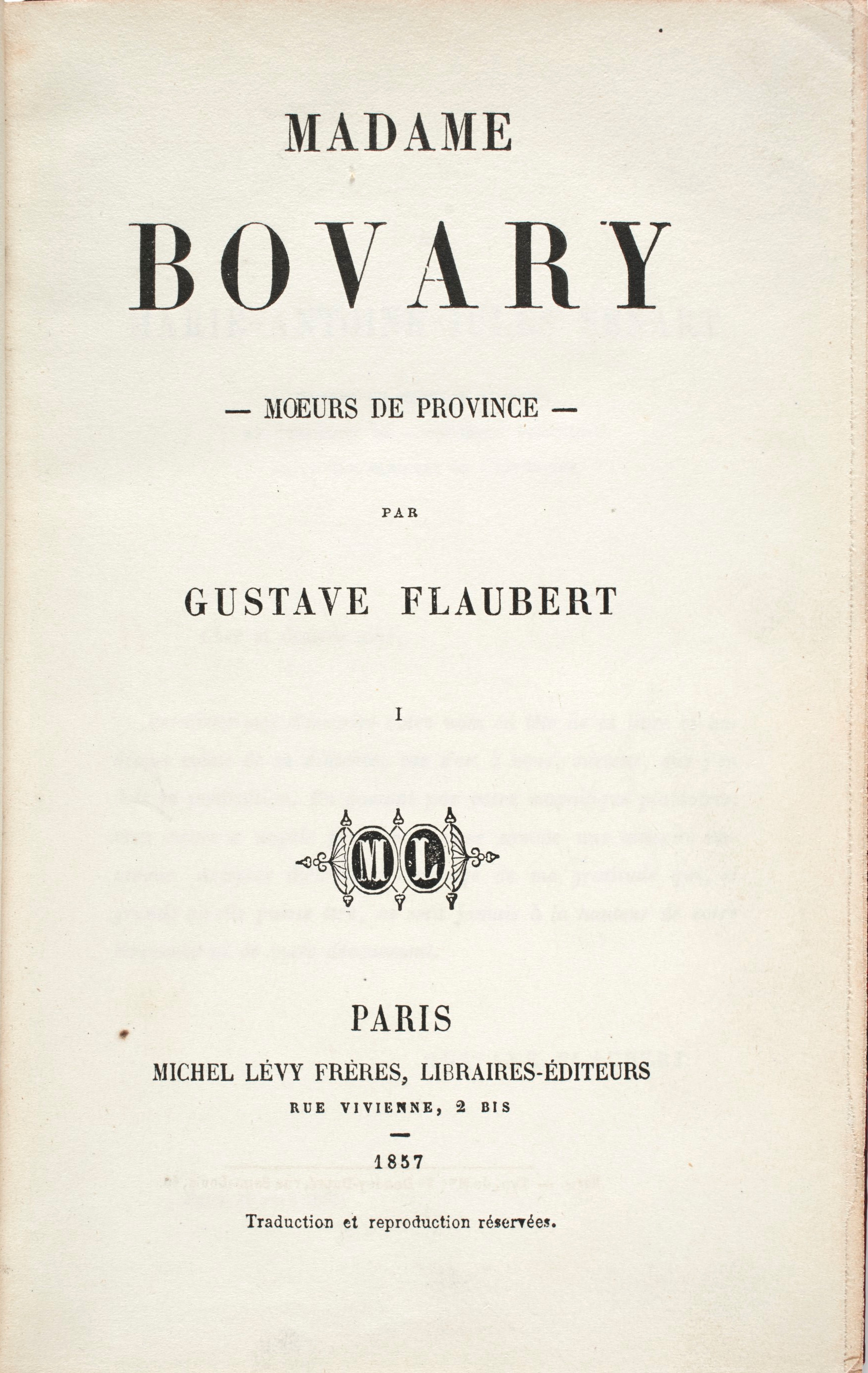
Title page of the first edition of Gustave Flaubert's Madame Bovary (Lévy, Paris, 1857).

The theme of adultery has been used in many literary works, and has served as a theme for notable books such as Anna Karenina, Madame Bovary, Lady Chatterley's Lover, The Scarlet Letter and Adultery. It has also been the theme of many movies.

== See also ==
- Adultery in literature
- Affair
- Cuckquean
- Cuckold
- Emotional affair
- Family therapy (Relationship counseling)
- Incidence of monogamy
- Infidelity
- Jesus and the woman taken in adultery
- MacLennan v MacLennan
- Open marriage
- Polygyny threshold model
- Polyamory
- Sexual jealousy in humans
- Swinging
