= MacLennan v MacLennan =

Scottish court case

MacLennan v MacLennan 1958 SC 105 is a Scots a family law decision that ruled that artificial insemination does not constitute adultery for the purposes of divorce.

The MacLennans were married in August 1952. However, the couple separated shortly afterwards, and Mrs MacLennan moved to the United States. In July 1955, she had a baby girl. Mr MacLennan sued for divorce on the grounds of adultery. Mrs MacLennan claimed that she had conceived the child through artificial insemination and that she had not committed adultery.

The Outer House of the Court of Session had to decide if artificial insemination could constitute adultery.

This is where the definition taken from Lord Wheatley's comments that adultery had to involve "physical contact with an alien and unlawful organ". The court lays down specific rules for adultery: 1- In adultery there must be two parties, physically present and engaging in sexual act. 2- It is not necessary that there is any interaction between the sperm and the ovum.

The court ruled artificial insemination does not constitute adultery. However, Mrs MacLennan could not provide the court with any proof of her taking artificial insemination. Mr MacLennan therefore got his divorce.
