= Abortion in India =

Abortion has been legal in India under various with the introduction of the Medical Termination of Pregnancy (MTP) Act, 1971. The Medical Termination of Pregnancy Regulations, 2003 were issued under the Act to enable women to access safe and legal abortion services.

In 2021, MTP Amendment Act 2021 was passed with certain amendments to the MTP Act 1971, such as women being allowed to seek safe abortion services on grounds of contraceptive failure, an increase in gestation limit to 24 weeks for special categories of women, and opinion of one abortion service provider required up to 20 weeks of gestation. Abortion can now be performed until 24 weeks of pregnancy as the MTP Amendment Act 2021 has come into force by notification in Gazette from 24 September 2021. The cost of the abortion service is covered fully by the government's public national health insurance funds, Ayushman Bharat and Employees' State Insurance with the package rate for surgical abortion being set at ₹15,500 (US$170) which includes consultation, therapy, hospitalization, medication, ultrasound, and follow-up treatments. For medical abortion, the package rate is set at ₹1,500 (US$16) which includes consultation and USG.

== Types of Abortion ==
When a woman gets a pregnancy terminated voluntarily from a service provider, it is called induced abortion. Spontaneous abortion, also known as miscarriage, is the loss of a woman's pregnancy before the 20th week. This type of abortion can be physically and emotionally painful.

Until 2017, there was a dichotomous classification of abortion as safe and unsafe.

Unsafe abortion was defined by the World Health Organization (WHO) as "a procedure for termination of a pregnancy done by an individual who does not have the necessary training or in an environment not conforming to minimal medical standards." However, with abortion technology now becoming safer, this has been replaced by a three-tier classification of safe, less safe, and least safe permitting a more nuanced description of the spectrum of varying situations that constitute unsafe abortion and the increasingly widespread substitution of dangerous, invasive methods with the use of misoprostol outside the formal health system.

- Safe abortion: provided by healthcare workers and with methods recommended by the WHO.
- Less-safe abortion: done by trained providers using non-recommended methods or using a safe method (e.g. misoprostol) but without adequate information or support from a trained individual.
- Least-safe abortion: done by a trained provider using dangerous, invasive methods.

== Abortion law in India ==
=== Before 1971 (Indian Penal Code, 1860) ===
Before 1971, abortion was criminalized under Section 312 of the Indian Penal Code, 1860, describing it as intentionally "causing miscarriage". Except in cases where abortion was carried out to save the life of the woman, it was a punishable offense and criminalized women/providers, with whoever voluntarily caused a woman with child to miscarry facing three years in prison and/or a fine, and the woman availing of the service facing seven years in prison and/or a fine.

It was in the 1960s, when abortion was legal in 15 countries, that deliberation on a legal framework for induced abortion in India was initiated. The alarmingly increased number of abortions taking place put the Ministry of Health and Family Welfare (MoHFW) on alert. To address this, the government of India instated a committee in 1964 led by Shantilal Shah to come up with suggestions to draft the abortion law for India. The recommendations of this committee were accepted in 1970 and introduced in the Parliament as the Medical Termination of Pregnancy Bill. This bill was passed in August 1971 as the Medical Termination of Pregnancy Act, which was authored by Sripati Chandrasekhar.

==== Shah committee key highlights ====
- The Shah Committee was appointed by the Government of India in 1964.
- The Committee carried out a comprehensive review of the socio-cultural, legal and medical aspects of abortion.
- The Committee in 1966 recommended legalizing abortion in its report to prevent wastage of women's health and lives on both compassionate and medical grounds.
- According to the report, in a population of 500 million, the number of abortions per year will be 6.5 million–2.6 million natural and 3.9 million induced.

==== Abortion incidence in India ====
A study in 2018 estimated that 15.6 million abortions took place in India in 2015. A significant proportion of these are expected to be unsafe. Unsafe abortion is the third largest cause of maternal mortality leading to death of 10 women each day and thousands more facing morbidities. There is a need to strengthen women's access to CAC (Comprehensive Abortion Care) services and preventing deaths and disabilities faced by them.

The last large-scale study on induced abortion in India was conducted in 2002 as part of the Abortion Assessment Project. The studies as part of this project estimated 6.4 million abortions annually in India.

=== The Medical Termination of Pregnancy Act, 1971 ===
The Medical Termination of Pregnancy (MTP) Act, 1971 provides the legal framework for making CAC services available in India. Termination of pregnancy is permitted for a broad range of conditions up to 20 weeks of gestation as detailed below:

- When continuation of pregnancy is a risk to the life of a pregnant woman or could cause grave injury to her physical or mental health;
- When there is substantial risk that the child would be dead, or if born, would be seriously handicapped due to physical or mental abnormalities;
- When pregnancy is caused due to rape (anguish caused by such pregnancy presumed to constitute grave injury to the mental health of the rape survivor);
- When pregnancy is caused due to failure of contraceptives used by a married woman or her husband (presumed to constitute grave injury to mental health of the woman).

The MTP Act specifies — (i) who can terminate a pregnancy; (ii) till when a pregnancy can be terminated; and (iii) where can a pregnancy be terminated. The MTP Rules and Regulations, 2003 detail training and certification requirements for a provider and facility; and provide reporting and documentation requirements for safe and legal termination of pregnancy.

==== Who may terminate a pregnancy ====
As per the MTP Act, pregnancy can be terminated only by a registered medical practitioner (RMP) who meets the following requirements:

(i) has a recognized medical qualification under the Indian Medical Council Act

(ii) whose name is entered in the State Medical Register

(iii) who has such experience or training in gynaecology and obstetrics as per the MTP Rules

==== Where a pregnancy may be terminated ====
All government hospitals are by default permitted to provide CAC services. Facilities in the private sector however require approval of the government. The approval is sought from a committee constituted at the district level called the District Level Committee (DLC) with three to five members. As per the MTP Rules, 2003 the following forms are prescribed for approval of a private place to provide MTP services:

1. Form A [Sub-Rule (2) of Rule 5]: Application Form for Approval of a Private Place: This form is used by the owner of a private place to apply for approval for provision of MTP services. Form A has to be submitted to the Chief Medical Officer of the district.
2. Form B [Sub-Rule (6) of Rule 5]: Certificate of Approval: The certificate of approval for private place deemed fit to provide MTP services is issued by the DLC on this format.

==== Consent required for termination of pregnancy ====
As per the provisions of the MTP Act, only the consent of woman whose pregnancy is being terminated is required. However, in case of a minor i.e. below the age of 18 years, or a woman with mental illness, consent of guardian (MTP Act defines guardian as someone who has the care of the minor. This does not imply that only parent/s are required to consent.) is required for termination. The MTP Rules, 2003 prescribe that consent needs to be documented on Form C as detailed below:

1. Form C [Rule 9] Consent Form: This form is used to document consent of the woman seeking termination. Pregnancy of a woman who is above 18 years of age can be terminated with only her consent. If she is below 18 years of age or mentally ill, written consent of the guardian is required.

==== Opinions required for termination of pregnancy ====
The MTP Act details that for terminations up to 12 weeks, the opinion of a single Registered Medical Practitioner (RMP) is required and for terminations between 12 and 20 weeks the opinion of two RMP's is required. However, termination is conducted by one RMP. The MTP Regulations, 2003 prescribe opinion of RMP/s to be recorded on Form I as detailed below:

1. Form I [Regulation 3] Opinion Form: This form is used to record opinion of the RMPs' for termination of pregnancy. For termination up to 12 weeks of gestation, opinion of one RMP is required whereas for the length of pregnancy between 12 and 20 weeks, opinion of two RMPs is required.

===== The MTP Regulations, 2003 =====
1. Form III [Regulation 5] Admission Register: This template is used to document details of women whose pregnancies have been terminated at the facility. The register needs to be retained for a period of five years till the end of the calendar year it relates to.
2. Form II [Regulation 4(5)] Monthly Statement: This form is used to report MTP performed at a hospital or approved place during the month. The head of the hospital or owner of the approved place should send the monthly report of MTP cases to the Chief Medical Officer of the district.

=== MTP Act, Amendments, 2002 ===
The Medical Termination of Pregnancy (MTP) Act 1971, was amended in 2002 to facilitate better implementation and increase access for women especially in the private health sector.

1. The amendments to the MTP Act in 2002 decentralized the process of approval of a private place to offer abortion services to the district level. The District level committee is empowered to approve a private place to offer MTP services in order to increase the number of providers offering CAC services in the legal ambit.
2. The word 'lunatic' was substituted with the words "mentally ill person". This change in language was instituted to lay emphasis that "mentally ill person" means a person who is in need for treatment by reason of any mental disorder other than intellectual disability.
3. For ensuring compliance and safety of women, stricter penalties were introduced for MTPs being conducted in unapproved sites or by untrained medical providers by the Act.

=== MTP Rules, 2003 ===
The MTP Rules facilitate better implementation and increase access for women especially in the private health sector.

- Composition and tenure of District Level Committee: The MTP rules 2003, define composition of the committee stating that one member of the committee should be a gynecologist / surgeon/ anesthetist and other members should be from the local medical profession, non-government organizations, and Panchayati Raj Institution of the district and one member of the committee should be a woman.
- Approved place for providing medical termination of pregnancies: The MTP Rules 2003, provide specific guidelines pertaining to equipment, facilities, drugs, and referral linkages to higher facilities required by an approved place for providing quality CAC and post abortion services.
- Inspection of private place: The MTP Rules 2003 state that an approved can be inspected by the Chief Medical Officer (CMO), as often as may be necessary with a view to verify whether termination of pregnancies are being done therein under safe and hygienic conditions.
- Cancellation or suspension of a certificate of approval for a private place: As per the MTP Rules 2003, if the CMO of the District is satisfied that the facilities specified in rule 5 are not being properly maintained therein and the termination of pregnancy at such place cannot be made under safe and hygienic conditions, she/he shall make a report of the fact to the Committee giving the detail of the deficiency or defects found at the place. The committee may, if satisfied, can suspend or, cancel the approval of the place provided that the committee gives the owner of the place a chance of representation before the certificate issued under rule 5 is cancelled.

=== Proposed Amendments to the MTP Act, 2014 ===
The Government took cognizance of the challenges faced by women in accessing safe abortion services and in 2006 constituted an expert group to review the existing provisions of the MTP Act to propose draft amendments. A series of expert group meetings were held from 2006 to 2010 to identify strategies for strengthening access to safe abortion services. In 2013 a national consultation was held which was attended by a range of stakeholders further emphasized the need for amendments to the MTP Act. In 2014, MoHFW shared the Medical Termination of Pregnancy Amendment Bill 2014 in the public domain. The proposed amendments to the MTP Act were primarily based on increasing the availability of safe and legal abortion services for women in the country.

- Expanding the provider base
- Increasing the upper gestation limit for legal MTPs
- Increasing access to legal abortion services for women
- Increasing clarity of the MTP law

Expanding provider base: In order to increase the availability of safe and legal abortion services, it has been recommended to increase the base of legal MTP providers by including medical practitioners with bachelor's degree in Ayurveda, Siddha, Unani or Homeopathy. These categories of Indian System of Medicines (ISM) practitioners have Obstetrician and Gynecology (ObGyn) training and abortion services as part of their undergraduate curriculum. It has also been recommended to include nurses with a three and half-year's degree and registered with the Nursing Council of India, into the base of legal providers for abortion services. In addition, it has also been recommended that Auxiliary Nurse Midwives (ANM) posted at high case load service delivery points be included as legal providers of MMA only. These recommendations are supported by two Indian studies that conclude abortions can safely and effectively be provided by nurses and AYUSH practitioners.

Provisions to increase the gestation limit for abortions: It is recommended to increase the gestational limit for seeking abortions on grounds of fetal abnormality beyond 20 weeks. This would result in making abortion available at any time during the pregnancy, if the fetus is diagnosed with severe fetal abnormalities. In addition, further to the above recommendations, it is also proposed to include increasing the gestation limit for safe abortion services for vulnerable categories of women expected to include survivors of rape and incest, single women (unmarried, divorced, or widowed) and other vulnerable women (women with disabilities) to 24 weeks. The amendments to the MTP Rules would define the details for the same.

Increasing access to legal abortion services for women: The Act in its current form imposes some operational barriers that limit women's access to safe and legal abortion services. The amendments propose to:

- Reducing the condition of requirement of the opinion of two health care providers for second trimester pregnancies to one health care provider only, as this is seen as a hindrance in access to safe abortion services by women in situations where two providers are not available: In 1971 when the MTP Act was passed about four decades ago dilatation and curettage (D&C) was the only available technology for termination of pregnancies. D&C now is an outdated invasive medical procedure that requires the use of a metal curette for removing products of conception. The provisions in the MTP Act for opinion of two medical providers or third party authorization for ensuring women's safety needs to be reduced in light of newer and safer technological advancements that make abortion a very safe out-patient medical procedure. The WHO 2012 guidance on Safe abortion: technical and policy guidance for health systems also recommends reducing third party authorization. The WHO 2012 guidance defines a woman seeking an abortion as an "autonomous adult", which means that "mentally competent adults do not require the authorization of any third party", stating that "health-care providers should not impose a requirement of third-party authorization unless required by law and related regulations".
- Extending the indication of contraception to include unmarried women: As per the provisions of the MTP Act, contraceptive failure is the only condition that applies to married women. The proposal for amendment includes making contraceptive failure applicable for all women and their partners as with other reasons for termination of pregnancy under the MTP Act.

=== MTP Amendment Act, 2021 ===
On 29 January 2020, Government of India first introduced the MTP Amendment Bill 2020, which was passed in Lok Sabha on 17 March 2020. A year later, the Bill was placed in Rajya Sabha and was passed on 16 March 2021 as the MTP Amendment Act 2021. The Amendments are as below:

- Married clause dropped - The MTP Act earlier permitted termination of the pregnancy by only a married woman in the case of failure of contraceptive method or device. With the amendment, unmarried women can now seek safe abortion services on grounds of contraceptive failure.
- Increase in gestation limit - Under the MTP Act 1971, the time limit for terminating pregnancy was up to 12 weeks on the advice of one doctor and up to 20 weeks on the advice of two doctors. Moreover, post 20 weeks terminating pregnancy was not permitted. However, now all women can terminate pregnancy up to 20 weeks on the advice of one doctor and special categories of women (survivors of sexual abuse, minors, victims of rape, incest, disabled women) can seek termination up to 24 weeks. Moreover, women/couples can seek termination of pregnancy, anytime during the gestation period for foetal anomalies, as diagnosed by the Medical Boards.
- Medical Boards - The amendments mandate constitution of Medical Boards in all the states and union territories for diagnosing substantial fetal anomalies. The Board will decide if a pregnancy may be terminated after 24 weeks and each board will have a gynecologist, radiologist/sonologist, pediatrician and other members notified by the government.
- Confidentiality - A registered medical practitioner may only reveal the details of a woman whose pregnancy has been terminated to a person authorized by law. Violation is punishable with imprisonment up to a year, a fine, or both.

=== MTP Rules, 2021 ===
The new rules as per the amendments were announced by the government on October 12. Following are the revised rules as per the amendment act:

1. The gestation period upper limit for terminating a pregnancy with 1 doctor's opinion has been extended from 12 weeks to 20 weeks, with the rule being expanded to include unmarried women as well.
2. The gestation period upper limit for termination of pregnancy with 2 doctors' opinion has been extended from 20 weeks to 24 weeks, for the following special categories:
  1. survivors of sexual assault or rape or incest
  2. minors
  3. change of marital status during the pregnancy (widowhood and divorce)
  4. women with physical disabilities
  5. mentally ill women
  6. the foetal anomalies that have substantial risk of being incompatible with life or if the child is born it may suffer from such physical or mental abnormalities to be seriously handicapped
  7. women with pregnancy in humanitarian settings or disaster or emergency
3. A state-level Medical Board will determine the request for termination of a pregnancy longer than 24 weeks in the cases of foetal anomalies.

==== Role of the medical board ====
1. To examine the woman and her reports
2. To approve or deny the request for termination within 3 days of receiving it
3. To ensure that the termination procedure, when advised by the Medical Board, is carried out with all safety precautions along with appropriate counselling within 5 days of the receipt of the request for medical termination of pregnancy

==== The Medical Board shall consist of the following ====
1. a Gynaecologist;
2. a Pediatrician;
3. a Radiologist or Sonologist; and
4. other members notified by the State Government or Union territory

== Policy and Programmatic Interventions of the Government ==
The MTP Act 1971 provides the legal framework for provision of induced abortion services in India. However, to ensure effective roll-out of services there is a need for standards, guidelines and standard operating procedures.

The Government of India has taken several measures to ensure the implementation of the MTP Act and make CAC services available to women. Some of them include:

- Comprehensive Abortion Care–Service Delivery and Training Guidelines 2010 were issued by MoHFW in 2010. These guidelines provide comprehensive information on all aspects of abortion, including counselling, legal issues, abortion provision, and post abortion contraception for programme managers and doctors. These guidelines are being used by all states and union territories to standardize CAC trainings and service delivery.
- In 2014, MoHFW took cognizance of technological updates and global best practice and constituted an expert group to update the Comprehensive Abortion Care–Service Delivery and Training Guidelines. The revised CAC guidelines were issued in 2014.
- CAC training package: To ensure consistency in CAC trainings across the country, MoHFW developed a standardized training package including trainer's manual, provider's manual, and operational guidelines on CAC and a CD of training games. This package was developed after consultation with experts and issued by the MoHFW in 2014. It is being used for training MBBS doctors as certified providers in all states and union territories.
- Trainer's manual: The manual is designed to provide trainers with detailed guidelines and aids for conducting CAC trainings. The manual aims to enhance skills of doctors for providing respectful, confidential and high quality CAC services to women.
- Provider's manual: The manual is designed to provide requisite clinical skills to the providers, increase the capacity of nursing staff to support the providers and provide detailed guidelines on how to conduct the CAC services.
- Operational guidelines on CAC services: The Operational Guidelines on CAC services were also included as part of the training package with the objective to guide programme managers on implementation of women centered CAC at all levels of public health facilities.
- State Program Implementation Plans (PIPs): All states and union territories are required to submit their annual Programme Implementation Plans as part of the National Health Mission for implementation of health interventions at public health facilities. These are reviewed by MoHFW and fund allocation is made on the Record of Proceedings (RoPs) after approval in the National Program Coordination Committee (NPCC). All states include budgets for CAC implementation including training, service delivery, procurement, orientation workshops etc. in the annual PIP.
- Ensuring Access to Safe Abortion and Addressing Gender Biased Sex Selection: The MTP Act and the PC&PNDT Acts are designed to regulate completely different areas. However, at the level of implementation, the need for clarity in keeping the implementation apart has been articulated often. UNFPA and Ipas had collaborated in 2012 to draft frequently asked questions on interlinkages of gender biased sex selection and access to safe abortions. This document was designed to provide clarity on the provisions of the two laws to policy makers.
- A need for clarity in implementation of the two laws and keeping them apart continued to be articulated from the states and districts. This was re-emphasized at the Government of India (GoI) — Ipas Development Foundation (IDF) national consultation on Prioritizing CAC for Women within NHM held on 19–20 May 2014. GoI constituted an expert group to review the situation on ground and draft the required guidelines.
- For addressing conflation of the Medical Termination of the Pregnancy (MTP) Act 1971, and Pre-Conception and Pre-Natal Diagnostic Techniques (PC&PNDT) Act 2012, and ensuring unimpeded access to CAC services MoHFW, GoI issued a Guidance Handbook and ready reckoner on Ensuring Access to Safe Abortion and Addressing Gender Biased Sex Selection. The experts reviewed the provisions of both the acts and the situation on the ground and drafted a guidance handbook on ensuring access to safe abortion and addressing gender biased sex selection. The handbook contains simplified guidelines on both laws and is designed to provide information to implementing authorities of the MTP Act and PC&PNDT Act; providers; compliance with the laws for providers of services under both the laws; and information on designing and implementing communication on both these issues. The ready reckoner provides a quick reference to the Guidance Handbook.
- Health Management Information System (HMIS) is an initiative by the MoHFW, GoI under the National Health Mission to provide comprehensive information on all indicators for health services being offered primarily in the public sector. HMIS has provisions for real-time facility based reporting. This portal is dynamic and is updated daily. It provides reports on health service delivery by indicator and state. Abortion service delivery is also recorded in the HMIS system. Recent reports show that reporting on abortion service delivery is highly under-reported. It captures abortion indicators such as abortion up to 12 weeks of pregnancy, abortion more than 12 weeks of pregnancy, number of women treated for post abortion complications, and number of women provided with post abortion contraception.
- National mass media campaign: The first ever national mass media campaign on making abortion safer was launched by the MoHFW, GoI in 2014. IDF worked in close collaboration with the MoHFW to develop this mass media campaign. The campaign focuses on normalizing abortion, with the key message safety in early abortion.

=== Medical Methods of Abortion (MMA) ===
MMA is a method of termination of pregnancy using a combination of drugs. These drugs have been approved for use in India by the Drug Controller General of India. MMA has been globally recognized as a method of choice for women seeking CAC services. World over, women prefer to adopt MMA while seeking safe abortion services given the confidentiality and safety it offers to them. However, the unavailability of drugs has hindered access to safe abortions across India. Foundation for Reproductive Health Services India (FRHS India) published a research report on the Availability of Medical Abortion Drugs in the Markets of Six Indian States, 2020. This report indicated that about 56% chemists reported regulatory barriers to stocking and sale of these drugs.

Moreover, the conflation in the MTP Act and the DCGI approval for usage of MA drugs only exacerbates the problem further. The MTP Rules allow an approved provider to prescribe MA drugs at his/her clinic (explanation to section 5 of the MTP Rules 2003). Whereas, labelling guidelines issued by the Central Drugs Standards Control Organisation (CDSCO, DTAB-DCC Division) dated 9 August 2019 says "Warning: Product to be used only under the supervision of a service provider and in a medical facility as specified under the MTP Act 2002 and MTP Rules 2003". The MTP Rules 2003 does not state that the product should be used only in a medical facility. The Comprehensive Abortion Care: Training and Service Delivery Guidelines 2018, Ministry of Health and Family Welfare, Government of India states that MA drugs can be used by a client at home at the discretion of the provider. However, this labelling guidance is being interpreted to say that MA drugs cannot be sold in retail. The CDSCO guidance contravenes the MTP Rules, which allows prescription of MA drugs.

==== Technical Material on MMA ====
- MMA Training Package: The MMA training package was issued by the MoHFW in 2016. The package was developed to make abortion services and care through MMA in the public sector accessible for women who need it. The training package includes a handbook on medical methods of abortion, a ready reckoner on MMA for the provider, MMA follow-up card and an e-module on MMA.
- Handbook on Medical Methods of Abortion: The Handbook was developed by the Maternal Health division of the MoHFW in 2016 to provide detailed technical information to CAC trained Gynecologists and Medical officers on providing MMA services to women at their facilities. The handbook provides detailed information on drugs; counselling; documentation formats; contraception; and treatment of side effects and potential complications.
- E-module on Medical Methods of Abortion: The e- module was developed by the MoHFW, GoI as an online MMA-specific refresher course for CAC- trained providers and gynecologists for improving their skills and knowledge to improve quality of CAC services for women.
- Medical Methods of Abortion (MMA) Ready Reckoner for the Provider: The ready reckoner acts as a quick reference tool for drug dosage and schedule, the must do's for each day of visit and important instructions for the women on every visit.
- MMA follow-up card: The card is provided to women undergoing abortion to help them keep track of the MMA process and identify symptoms of post abortion complications (if any) during the 15 days of MMA process.

==== Community Mobilization for RMNCHA activities ====
Community health workers bridge the gap between community and the health system. ASHA's play a significant role in provision of information about health services, establishing linkage between and health facilities, providing community level health care and as an activist, building people's understanding of health rights and enables them to access their entitlements at the public health facilities to women on a range of issues including CAC. The National Health Systems Resource Centre (NHSRC) has worked closely with the MoHFW to develop training packages for Accredited Social Health Activist (ASHA) to enable them to provide the required information to women at the community level and facilitate linkages with the facilities. ASHA training modules developed by MoHFW and NHSRC are a key component under the National Health Mission to provide ASHAs with information on relevant topics. Information on CAC and related topics is available in three of seven modules:

- ASHA training module II details on the legality of abortion in India under MTP Act 1971. It lays downs the roles and responsibilities of ASHAs for creating awareness and ensuring access to CAC services for women. The module also elaborates on surgical and medical abortion, post-abortion care and post-abortion contraception.
- ASHA training module III details on the relevance of family planning methods and the different methods of family planning. The module emphasizes the need to counsel women to adopt family planning methods to prevent unwanted pregnancies.
- ASHA training module VII details the need for safe abortion services and the critical role of ASHAs in assisting women access these services. The module aims to train AHSAs to counsel women on the different methods of abortion, risks associated with unsafe abortion, identifying symptoms of post abortion complications, advising on appropriate referrals and counselling women on post abortion contraception.

==== Communication on CAC ====
CAC service is an integral component of the maternal health programme under NHM. However, awareness among men and women about legality as well as availability of abortion services is very low. IDF too has conducted studies to understand the awareness about abortion legality among men and women and found that awareness and legality was low. Even though some of the people are aware of their legal rights regarding abortion, they are unaware of where they can access abortion services. This non-accessibility of abortion services is primarily on moral and political grounds. Also, women are not readily supplied with information about abortion services, nor about the option of abortion unless in emergency circumstances or cases where the baby is unhealthy.

== Statistics ==
Globally, 56 million abortions take place every year. In South and Central Asia, an estimated 16 million abortions took place between 2010 and 2014, and 13 million abortions occurred in Eastern Asia alone.

There is significant variance in the estimates for the number of abortions reported and the total number of estimated abortions taking place in India. According to HMIS reports, the total number of spontaneous/induced abortions that took place in India in 2016–17 was 970,436, in 2015–16 was 901,781, in 2014–15 was 901,839, and in 2013–14 was 790,587. It is reported that ten women die every day in India due to unsafe abortions.

The Guttmacher Institute, New York, International Institute for Population Sciences (IIPS), Mumbai and Population Council, New Delhi conducted the first study in India to estimate the incidence of abortion. The results from this study were published in Lancet Global Health journal in December 2017 in the form of a paper titled "The incidence of abortion and unintended pregnancy in India, 2015". This study estimates that 15.6 million abortions took place in India in 2015. 3.4 million (22%) of these took place in health facilities, 11.5 million (73%) were done through medical methods outside facilities, and 5% are expected to have been done through other methods. The study further found the abortion rate at 47 abortions per 1000 women aged 15–49 years. The study highlights the need for strengthening public health system to provide abortion service delivery. This would include ensuring availability of trained providers, including non-allopathic providers by amending the MTP Act and expanding the provider base as well as streamlining availability of drugs and supplies. Another strategy is to streamline the process of approving private-sector facilities to provide CAC services and strengthening counseling and post-abortion contraception services in efforts to strengthen quality of care for women seeking CAC services.

Prior to this study, the last available estimate for incidence of abortion at 6.4 million abortions per year in India was from the 'Abortion Assessment Project — India'. This was a multicentre study of 380 abortion facilities (of which 285 were private) carried out across six States. The study found that "on average there were four formal abortion facilities (medically qualified though not necessarily certified to carry out abortions) per 100,000 population in India and an average of 1.2 providers per facility". Out of the total formal abortion providers, 55% were gynecologists and 64% of the facilities had at least one female provider. The study further found that only 31% of the reasons for seeking abortion by women were within grounds permitted under the MTP Act, the other reasons being unwanted pregnancy, economic reasons and unwanted sex of the foetus.

== Methods of abortion ==
=== Manual vacuum aspiration ===
Manual vacuum aspiration (MVA) is a "safe and effective method of abortion that involves evacuation of the uterine contents by the use of a hand-held plastic aspirator", which is "associated with less blood loss, shorter hospital stays and a reduced need for anesthetic drugs". This method of abortion is recommended by the WHO for early termination of pregnancy.

=== Electric vacuum aspiration ===
Electric vacuum aspiration (EVA) is similar to the MVA insofar as it involves a suction method, but the former uses an electric pump to create suction, instead of the hand-operated pump in MVA.

=== Medical abortion ===
Medical abortion is the termination of pregnancy by drugs. It is a "non-invasive method of ending an unwanted pregnancy that women can use in a range of settings, and often in their own homes". The two drugs approved for use in India are mifepristone and misoprostol.

- Mifepristone (RU 486): Progesterone is a hormone required for the growth of the foetus. This drug has anti-progesterone action so it stops the growth of the fetus. The process of medical abortion is started with this drug.
- Misoprostol: This drug is used to induce softening of the cervix so that it is dilated easily. It also produces uterine contractions. Due to cervical softening and contraction of the uterine muscles, it helps to expel the contents from the uterus.

In India, use of these drugs (mifepristone and misoprostol) for termination of pregnancy is approved up to nine weeks. This method can increase access to safe abortion services for women since it allows providers to offer CAC services where MVA or other abortion methods are not feasible.

=== Dilation and curettage ===
The only abortion technique available when abortion was decriminalized in India in 1971 was the dilation and curettage (D&C) method. This dated method is an invasive medical procedure which requires "the use of anesthesia for removing products of conception using a metal curette", often running the risk of hemorrhage or uterine infections. WHO and FIGO issued a joint recommendation which stated that properly equipped hospitals should abandon curettage and adopt manual/electric aspiration methods.

== Miscarriage leave ==
India was the first country to legalize miscarriage leave.

The Maternity Benefit Act 1961 states that in case of miscarriage, a woman will be entitled to paid leave for six weeks immediately following the day of her miscarriage. Women are required to submit proof for miscarriage and willful termination of pregnancy (abortion) is excluded.

Additionally, women with illness arising out of miscarriage shall, on production are also entitled to paid leave of up to one month on submission of relevant medical proofs.

== Reasons for unsafe abortions ==
Almost 56% of abortions in India are under the category of unsafe. Unsafe abortions is a common recourse for most women in the country, including in the rural pockets, due to various social, economic and logistical barriers. Stigma is another dimension that prevents women from seeking abortions from approved facilities.

Despite India's extensive efforts to improve maternal and reproductive health, wide geographical disparities exist between its urban and rural population. Interventions at various socio-ecologic and cultural levels, along with improved health literacy, access to improved health care and sanitation need attention when formulating and implementing policies and programs for equitable progress towards improved maternal and reproductive health.

Unsafe abortion, the third leading cause of maternal deaths in the country, contributes eight per cent of all such deaths annually with 13 women dying each day. Several factors contribute to women opting for abortion outside the accredited abortion centers including:

- Woman denied services as she is unable fulfil the requirement as per the MTP act, thus resorting to unsafe means
- Shortage of providers/absence of competent health professionals and poor perceived quality of care in government facilities in rural areas, is another major reason, as many rural and poor areas lack registered medical providers, supplies and infrastructure
- High abortion cost at hospitals in the cities. Private sector charges are huge and unaffordable for the poor
- Reluctance to obtain services from known neighborhood clinics due to lack of confidentiality
- Lack of awareness about the need to seek abortion early in pregnancy
- Providers denying services because of biases or misinformation around how laws governing sex selection, child sexual abuse and abortion intersect

== Profile of women seeking abortion ==
A client profile study focusing on the socio-economic profiles of women seeking abortion services, and costs of receiving abortion services at public health facilities in Madhya Pradesh, India, revealed that "57% of women of who received abortions at public health facilities were poor, followed by 21% moderate and 22% rich. More poor women sought care at primary health level facilities (58%) than secondary level facilities, and among women presenting for post-abortion complications (67%) than induced abortion." Further, the study found that women admitted to spending no money to access abortion services as they are free at public facilities. Poor women, it was reported, "spend INR 64 (USD 1) while visiting primary level facilities and INR 256 (USD 4) while visiting urban hospitals, primarily for transportation and food". The study concluded that the "improved availability of safe abortion services at the primary level in Madhya Pradesh has helped meeting the need of safe abortion services among poor, which eventually will help reducing the maternal mortality and morbidity due to unsafe abortion".

== Safe abortion and POCSO Act ==
The Protection of Children from Sexual Offences (POCSO) Act defines a child as any person below eighteen years of age, and defines different forms of sexual abuse, including penetrative and non-penetrative assault, as well as sexual harassment and pornography. The said Act prescribes stringent punishment graded as per the gravity of the offence, with a maximum term of rigorous imprisonment for life, and fine.

Although the Act safeguards the life and rights of children, it fails to differentiate between 'consensual sex' and offence and also does not address the grey area of 'early marriage'. Any sexual activity with persons below the set age i.e. 18 years is deemed as statutory rape. As the act fails to differentiate between offense and consent, it poses a huge barrier to access to sexual and reproductive health services for adolescents.

Moreover, the Act has the requirement of mandatory reporting and failing to do so can lead to penalty with imprisonment or a fine. This requirement impacts adolescents' sexual and reproductive health (SRH), as it results in denial of variety of SRH services such as contraception, medical help for sexually transmitted infections, etc. Health professionals are playing safe not to get entangled in legal proceedings thereby impacting SRH services.

The mandatory reporting also hinders access to safe abortion services for adolescents. The conflation between POCSO and MTP Acts result in denial of services for consensual as well as sexual assault of minors. Earlier the MTP Act required the consent of a guardian for a minor and that still remains, but due to POCSO Act, the mandatory reporting complicates the issue, and providers are wary of delivering safe abortion services to minors, even in case of assault, ensuing many to seek unsafe abortions to avoid legal hassles; and to further complicate parents exploiting this to harass children or their partners with imprisonment of 7 to 10 years.

== Safe abortion and gender-biased sex selection ==
Gender-biased sex selection and safe abortion are mutually exclusive issues within the purview of Indian law. While the MTP Act provides a framework for provision of abortion services, the PC&PNDT Act regulates the misuse of diagnostic techniques for determination of sex of the foetus. Both the laws have a very clearly defined purpose, however, there is still conflation in the implementation of the two laws. Due to the stringent implementation of the PC&PNDT Act, many doctors are afraid or are reluctant to provide MTP services due to the possibility of undergoing inspection and facing legal issues, thus creating great hindrance for accessing safe abortion services.

By conflating the two, confusion is being created in the minds of the public against a basic right of women. Even government posters for "awareness generation" of the public with respect to sex determination have been found to use the terminology of "bhroon hatya" or "foeticide" rather than "abortion" — a term that indicates a homicidal criminal activity of taking "a life". These incorrect messaging and unawareness has serious implications on access to safe abortion services for women.

For addressing this issue a group of organizations and individuals working on the issue came together to launch Pratigya Campaign for Gender Equality and Safe Abortion in 2013. The campaign provides a platform to address the issue of sex selection while protecting women's right to safe, legal abortion services in India. The campaign also created an information kit for the media on the subject.

== Impact of COVID-19 pandemic on access to safe abortion services ==
The nationwide lockdown imposed from 25 March onwards in an effort to combat the COVID-19 pandemic, adversely impacted contraceptive and safe abortion access. Ministry of Health and Family Welfare, Government of India suspended essential contraception services a week before the lockdown and issued a guidance advising that sterilizations and intrauterine contraceptive devices (IUCD) services should not be resumed until further notice. As a fallout of lockdown due to COVID-19, over 20 million couples in the country were deprived from availing contraceptives and terminating unintended pregnancies.

According to a report by IDF, around 1.85 million abortions, i.e. 50 percent of the number of abortions that would have taken place in this period normally, may have been compromised as a result of restriction on travel due to the lockdown from March to June in 2020. This would have resulted in a large number of unwanted pregnancies being seen through, as well as unsafe abortions that can result in maternal deaths. A report by FRHS India estimates that the pandemic situation could lead to an additional 834,042 unsafe abortions and 1,743 maternal deaths in India.

With limited mobility, increased reports of intimate partner violence, changes in living patterns of migrants, delays in accessing contraception and safe abortions, and potential changes to decisions about parenting, there is an increased need for safe abortion services in India due to the pandemic. Expanding telehealth to include information, support, and services around medical abortion can be a safe and revolutionary way to expand access to safe, legal abortion. Although according to WHO guidance, abortions in the first trimester can be safely self-managed as long as there is access to information and support, and to a facility in case of complications,40 in Indian law, abortions outside of health facilities without prescription from an RMP are currently illegal.

Offering abortion through telehealth can provide clients a legal, safe, and supported experience: expanding the use of telemedicine for abortion can provide legal protection to those self-managing without a prescription, without having to meet physically with an RMP. Given the need for medical abortion in India and the already existing self-use in large numbers, the openness of clients and providers alike to use technology for health, and the established safety of abortion via telemedicine from global models, it is clear that there is appetite for abortion provision using telemedicine. Public sector provision of abortion has several challenges — lack of trained staff, equipment and supplies, and nonjudgmental care up to the legally permitted extent, to name a few.38 Telemedicine for abortion can not only help address gaps in the public sector provision of safe abortion but can also serve as a viable choice even when quality services are available since it would reduce the burden on the health infrastructure by reducing in-person visits and enhancing privacy and confidentiality needs of clients. By expanding telemedicine to include medical abortion, India can forge the way ahead for safe abortion access not just during the pandemic, but also creating an opportunity for long-lasting impact.

== Recent court cases for late-term termination of pregnancy ==
The MTP Act allows for termination of pregnancy up to 20 weeks of pregnancy. In case termination of pregnancy is immediately necessary to save the life of the woman, this limit does not apply (Section 5 of the MTP Act). There are however cases of diagnosed foetal abnormalities and cases of women who are survivors of sexual abuse who have reached out to the Court with requests for termination of pregnancy beyond 20 weeks. A report by the Center for Reproductive Rights analyzed some of these cases that have come to court in a comprehensive report.

Another report by Pratigya Campaign assesses the role of judiciary in access to safe abortion. The report highlights the growing increase in the number of cases reaching courts for permission. While a number of orders permitting termination are based on the opinion of the medical board and the jurisprudence already laid down in previous cases, there have been some groundbreaking judgments in the past years also, which have been highlighted. This lays emphasis on the necessity for the law to keep up with the changing times. It is imperative that access to abortion becomes a legal right for pregnant women at least in the first trimester. It is necessary that the opinion of the doctor, that the woman is consulting should be considered as primary and the only one required. The setting up of medical boards which has been done by the Courts while dealing with cases of this nature has only created further obstacles for women in accessing safe and legal abortion.

Media has covered many of these cases actively. Listed below are some of the significant cases with requests for late term termination that have come to the court for permission.

- In December 2017, a 13-year-old rape survivor's father approached the Bombay High Court seeking permission for the termination of 26-week foetus. The girl was repeatedly raped by her cousin. Considering the report of the medical board which claimed that there was greater risk to the pregnant girl's life if continued, the Court held that the girl was physically incapable to deliver a child, and granted permission for termination.
- A 15-year-old girl who had eloped to marry, sought permission from the Delhi High Court to abort her 25-week pregnancy. The medical board assigned to examine her case, however, reported that termination would pose serious risks to the lives of both the foetus and the mother. Subsequently, the High Court denied the girl permission to undergo an abortion.
- A woman from Thane approached the Bombay High Court in December 2017, seeking permission to terminate her 22-week-old foetus that was diagnosed with various infirmities. The report of the medical committee ascertained that the child, if born, may have an intellectual disability, while admitting that terminating the pregnancy at this stage would be risky. After the petitioner expressed her willingness to take the risk, the Court permitted her to undergo abortion.
- After the foetus of a 24-year-old woman from Pune was diagnosed with a cardiac anomaly, she approached the Bombay High Court seeking permission to abort her 24-week foetus. The medical board asked to examine the woman advised abortion while reporting that the child, if born, may have to undergo multiple surgeries. The Court consequently, granted permission for the abortion.
- In November 2017, a woman approached the Bombay High Court for permission to terminate her pregnancy in 26th week of gestation on grounds of skeletal and neurological abnormalities. Further to the opinion of the medical board constituted by the court, she was granted permission to terminate her pregnancy due to fetal abnormalities incompatible with life.
- Foetuses of two women, in their 29th and 30th week of pregnancy were both diagnosed with Arnold Chiari Type II syndrome. Based on the report of JJ Hospital in Mumbai, the Supreme Court in October 2017 held that both foetuses were identical and that the continuation of pregnancy would harm both, thereby permitting the termination of pregnancy for both women.
- In October 2017, a 16-year-old rape survivor's father approached the Bombay High Court, seeking permission for the termination of his daughter's pregnancy in 27th week of gestation. The High Court denied the request. The decision was made following a report presented by a panel of doctors who examined her, which suggested that an abortion at this stage would pose potential risks to her health.
- In another incident in October 2017, a minor rape victim in her 23rd week of pregnancy had approached the Jharkhand High Court for permission to abort her foetus. While the medical board set up to examine the matter observed that it would be dangerous to abort at this stage, the board took it up as a challenge. The Court permitted the termination of pregnancy, and directed the government to make arrangements for the stay of the victim's parents.
- In October 2017, a 16-year-old's father had approached the Punjab and Haryana High Court to seek permission for the termination of her 26-week pregnancy that resulted from rape. The Court, following the report of the medical board that stated the abortion can be undertaken with the understanding that it involves risks, allowed the abortion and directed the board to carry out the necessary procedures.
- The mother of a 19-year-old girl with mild to moderate intellectual disability had approached the High Court of Himachal Pradesh in October 2017 for permission to terminate the girl's 32-week pregnancy. The medical board constituted by the High Court observed that if the pregnancy were continued, the foetus would have severe cognitive and motor impairments even after surgery. The Court therefore granted permission for the termination of the pregnancy.
- In September 2017, the mother of a 13-year-old rape survivor moved the apex court for permission to terminate her 32-week pregnancy. The Supreme Court permitted the abortion citing that it was a result of sexual abuse and the victim did not want to carry on with it, despite opposition from the Centre that argued that the pregnancy was too advanced.
- In September 2017, a woman in her 31st week of pregnancy sought permission to terminate her pregnancy as both kidneys of the foetus were found to be not functioning. Noting that the continuation of pregnancy will cause more mental anguish to her, the Supreme Court granted her permission.
- A 17-year rape victim approached the Karnataka High Court in September 2017 seeking permission to terminate her pregnancy that had exceeded 20 weeks, arguing that she will suffer mentally if she had to deliver her baby at such a young age. The Court, however, rejected the plea following the report of the medical board that suggested that termination of the pregnancy would not be good for the girl and the foetus.
- In August 2017, a 20-year-old woman from Pune approached the Supreme Court, seeking permission to abort her 24-week foetus that was diagnosed as having no skull. After the medical board reported that there was no treatment possible for the condition, the Supreme Court granted permission for the termination of the pregnancy.
- A 10-year-old girl in Chandigarh was found to be 26-weeks pregnant by local doctors, after which the District Court was approached to allow her to undergo an abortion. The girl, who was raped several times by her maternal uncle, was denied permission by the court in July 2017 to undergo abortion, after it was later revealed in another examination that the foetus was 32-weeks old.
- In July 2017, the 24-week foetus of a 21-year-old woman from Mumbai was diagnosed with mental abnormalities. Following this, renowned gynaecologist Dr. Nikhil Datar helped the husband of the woman file a petition in the Supreme Court, to allow her to undergo an abortion. The Supreme Court granted the permission.
- In July 2017, a 19-year-old rape survivor approached the Gujarat High Court seeking permission to terminate her 26-week pregnancy. While the girl pled that she was "totally innocent and will have to face punishment for her entire life for the crime committed by someone else", the plea was rejected by the High Court which argued that "the risk from abortion was higher than delivery at term".
- In June 2017, a Kolkata-based woman filed a petition in the Supreme Court, challenging Section 3 of the MTP Act which denies permission to abort the foetus beyond 20 weeks of pregnancy. The woman discovered that her foetus had congenital defect when she was 23 weeks pregnant, and had crossed the 20-week benchmark within which it is legal to terminate a pregnancy. The Supreme Court in response, appointed a medical board of seven senior doctors in Kolkata, directed it to examine her. The apex court called for a need to amend the MTP Act, to make it more "meaningful".
- In May 2017, a medical board of eight doctors referred the case of a 10-year-old pregnant girl who was raped by her stepfather, to the city court in Haryana. The board was unsure of the gestation, and concluded that it could be between 18 and 22 weeks. The city court advised the board to choose one of two ways — either to go ahead with the abortion by considering it to be below 18 weeks, or "wait for the pregnancy to complete its full term if they feel the unborn child has surpassed the age cap". Following this, the board decided to go ahead with the abortion.
- In May 2017, a 16-year-old rape survivor and her father approached the Gujarat High Court seeking permission to abort her foetus that had grown beyond 20 weeks. The Court allowed the teen to undergo abortion, citing that the abortion was not likely to endanger the life of the girl based on the medical opinion of a doctor.
- In May 2017, an HIV-positive destitute rape victim approached the Patna High Court with a plea to terminate her pregnancy. After the High Court turned down the plea, saying that "it was a compelling responsibility of the state to keep the child alive", the Supreme Court was approached. The apex court then granted permission to abort the now 26-week-old foetus, directing an AIIMS medical board to examine her. It stated that "a woman, who has already become a destitute, being sexually assaulted and suffering from a serious ailment, should not go through further suffering. The quintessential purpose of life is the dignity of life and all efforts are to be made to sustain it."
- In April 2017, the mother of a 16-year-old rape victim in Madhya Pradesh approached the Indore bench of the High Court seeking permission for the termination of her daughter's 33-week pregnancy. The plea was rejected by the bench, arguing that the "foetus was grown and an abortion was unjustified".
- In March 2017, a 28-year-old woman from Mumbai approached the Supreme Court to seek permission to terminate her 27-week pregnancy after discovering that the foetus had Arnold Chiari Type II syndrome — a condition similar to the one she saw her brother grow up with. The Supreme Court denied her permission for an abortion, ruling that there are chances the baby may be born alive.
- In February 2017, a 37-year-old woman in her 27th week of pregnancy approached the Supreme Court for permission to abort her foetus that was found to have Down Syndrome. After the medical board appointed by the Court advised against an abortion, the apex court denied her permission to terminate the pregnancy, citing that the baby could be "born alive" if the pregnancy was allowed to continue, while admitting that it was "very sad for a mother to bring up a mentally retarded child". The foetus was detected with a rare abnormality called the Arnold-Chiari malformation, where the brain and spinal cord connect.
- In January 2017, a 22-year-old woman sought permission from the Supreme Court to abort her 24-week foetus on medical grounds. Further to the medical board's report which revealed that the foetus was without scalp with bleak chances of survival, posing a threat to the life of the woman, the apex court granted her permission to undergo abortion.
- In July 2016, a 26-year-old rape victim approached the Supreme Court seeking permission to terminate her 24-week pregnancy, as the foetus had Anencephaly, a condition whereby most part of the brain, scull and scalp is missing. The medical board, after having examined her on the directions of the Supreme Court, declared that the woman's life was in danger. The apex court then granted her permission to abort the foetus.
- In February 2016, an 18-year-old rape victim sought permission from the Gujarat High Court to abort her 24-week foetus after having unsuccessfully attempted suicide by consuming acid. The panel of doctors submitted their report, following which, the High Court granted permission, citing that the continuation of the pregnancy "may result in a grave injury to her mental health".
- In the Samar Ghosh v. Jaya Ghosh case of March 2011, the Supreme Court examined whether a woman's decision to terminate a pregnancy without her husband's knowledge or consent would amount to mental cruelty. The Court in this case ruled that "if the wife undergoes vasectomy (sic) or abortion without medical reason or without the consent or knowledge of her husband, such as act may lead to mental cruelty".
- In November 2011, in the Dr. Mangla Dogra & Others v. Anil Kumar Malhotra & Others case dealing with the issue of whether a husband has a right to provide consent for abortion, the High Court of Punjab and Haryana stated that "the MTP Act requires consent from just one person: the woman undergoing a medical termination of pregnancy. A husband cannot force his wife to continue a pregnancy".
- In September 2009, in the Krupa Prolifers v. State of Kerala case, the Kerala High Court, while addressing the issue of regulating emergency contraception under the MTP Act, ruled that "emergency contraception does not cause termination of pregnancy and cannot be regulated by the MTP Act".
- In August 2009, the Supreme Court addressed the Suchitra Srivastava & Another v. Chandigarh Administration case on the issue of whether the state can consent to a termination as a guardian for a "mentally ill" woman who was raped in her state-run facility. The Court ruled that the facts must be examined in such a case, and where the woman is "not a minor and has a 'mild' mental illness, the Court has to ensure her reproductive rights, including the right to continue a pregnancy".
- In July 2008, a woman approached the Bombay High Court seeking permission to abort her 26-week-old foetus that was diagnosed with congenital heart defect. The High Court turned down the plea, arguing that "if born, the foetus would not suffer from any serious handicap".

=== September 2022 Supreme Court ruling ===
A three-judge bench of Supreme Court of India in Civil Appeal No. 5802 of 2022 made some findings on 29 September 2022. The judgement adds emphasis on women's right to bodily autonomy, sexual and reproductive choices, extended equal benefit of law to unmarried women and reduced number of hurdles like third party consent for adult women.

The judgement defined "woman" as all persons who require access to safe abortion, along with cisgender women, thus including trans people and other gender-diverse persons.

The Court noted that medical practitioners commonly insist that abortion-seekers comply with extra-legal conditions, such as obtaining the consent of the abortion seeker's family, producing documentary proof, or judicial authorisation, and that, if such conditions are not met, they frequently deny the abortion service. It found this practice "lamentable". The Court remarked that medical practitioners should refrain from imposing such requirements and that only the woman's consent was material, unless she was a minor or mentally ill. It also stated that "every pregnant woman has the intrinsic right to choose to undergo or not to undergo abortion without any consent or authorization from a third party" and that a woman is the ultimate decision-maker on the question of whether she wants to undergo an abortion."

On the topic of the difference between the gestation period considered legal for married and unmarried women -- 24 weeks for the former and 20 weeks for the latter -- the Court ruled that the distinction was discriminatory, artificial, unsustainable and in violation of Article 14 of the Constitution of India, and that "all women are entitled to the benefit of safe and legal abortion."

On the subject of pregnancies resulting from marital rape, the Court ruled that women can seek an abortion within the gestational period of 20 to 24 weeks under the ambit of "survivors of sexual assault or rape".

== Studies on abortion: A bibliography ==
- Singh, Susheela; Shekhar, Chander; Acharya, Rajib; Moore, Ann M.; Stillman, Melissa; Pradhan, Manas R.; Frost, Jennifer J.; Sahoo, Harihar; Alagarajan, Manoj (January 2018). "The incidence of abortion and unintended pregnancy in India, 2015". The Lancet Global Health. 6 (1): e111–e120. doi:10.1016/s2214-109x(17)30453-9. PMC 5953198. PMID 29241602.
- Stillman, Melissa; Frost, Jennifer J.; Singh, Susheela; Moore, Ann M.; Kalyanwala, Shveta (December 2014). "Abortion in India: A Literature Review" (PDF). Guttmacher Institute.
- Chae, Sophia; Desai, Sheila; Crowell, Marjorie; Sedgh, Gilda; Singh, Susheela (2017). "Characteristics of women obtaining induced abortions in selected low- and middle-income countries". PLOS ONE. 12 (3) e0172976. Bibcode:2017PLoSO..1272976C. doi:10.1371/journal.pone.0172976. PMC 5371299. PMID 28355285.
- GBD 2015 Maternal Mortality Collaborators (October 2016). "Global, regional, and national levels of maternal mortality, 1990–2015: a systematic analysis for the Global Burden of Disease Study 2015". Lancet. 388 (10053): 1775–1812. doi:10.1016/S0140-6736(16)31470-2. PMC 5224694. PMID 27733286.
- Iyengar, Kirti; Iyengar, Sharad D; Danielsson, Kristina Gemzell (June 2016). "Can India transition from informal abortion provision to safe and formal services?". The Lancet Global Health. 4 (6): e357–e358. doi:10.1016/S2214-109X(16)30047-X. ISSN 2214-109X. PMID 27198832.
- Sedgh, Gilda; Bearak, Jonathan; Singh, Susheela; Bankole, Akinrinola; Popinchalk, Anna; Ganatra, Bela; Rossier, Clémentine; Gerdts, Caitlin; Tunçalp, Özge (July 2016). "Abortion incidence between 1990 and 2014: global, regional, and subregional levels and trends". The Lancet. 388 (10041): 258–267. doi:10.1016/S0140-6736(16)30380-4. ISSN 0140-6736. PMC 5498988. PMID 27179755.
- Foster, Diana Greene (July 2016). "Unmet need for abortion and woman-centered contraceptive care". The Lancet. 388 (10041): 216–217. doi:10.1016/S0140-6736(16)30452-4. ISSN 0140-6736. PMID 27179753. S2CID 43537743. Archived from the original on 14 February 2019.
- Say, Lale; Chou, Doris; Gemmill, Alison; Tunçalp, Özge; Moller, Ann-Beth; Daniels, Jane; Gülmezoglu, A Metin; Temmerman, Marleen; Alkema, Leontine (June 2014). "Global causes of maternal death: a WHO systematic analysis". The Lancet Global Health. 2 (6): e323–e333. doi:10.1016/S2214-109X(14)70227-X. hdl:1854/LU-5796925. ISSN 2214-109X. PMID 25103301.
- Paul, Vinod Kumar; Sachdev, Harshpal Singh; Mavalankar, Dileep; Ramachandran, Prema; Sankar, Mari Jeeva; Bhandari, Nita; Sreenivas, Vishnubhatla; Sundararaman, Thiagarajan; Govil, Dipti (January 2011). "Reproductive health, and child health and nutrition in India: meeting the challenge". The Lancet. 377 (9762): 332–349. doi:10.1016/S0140-6736(10)61492-4. ISSN 0140-6736. PMC 3341742. PMID 21227494.
- Grimes, David A; Benson, Janie; Singh, Susheela; Romero, Mariana; Ganatra, Bela; Okonofua, Friday E; Shah, Iqbal H (November 2006). "Unsafe abortion: the preventable pandemic". The Lancet. 368 (9550): 1908–1919. doi:10.1016/S0140-6736(06)69481-6. ISSN 0140-6736. PMID 17126724. S2CID 6188636. Archived from the original on 18 August 2019.
- Coyaji, Kurus; Elul, Batya; Krishna, Usha; Otiv, Suhas; Ambardekar, Shubha; Bopardikar, Arti; Raote, Veena; Elleartson, Charlotte; Winikoff, Beverly (January 2001). "Mifepristone abortion outside the urban research hospital setting in India". The Lancet. 357 (9250): 120–122. doi:10.1016/S0140-6736(00)03549-2. ISSN 0140-6736. PMID 11197403. S2CID 34284661. Archived from the original on 17 April 2023.
- Mayall, Katherine; Remez, Lisa; Singh, Susheela (2020). "Global developments in laws on induced abortion: 2008–2019" (PDF). International Perspectives on Sexual and Reproductive Health. 46 (Suppl 1): 53–65. doi:10.1363/46e0920. PMID 33326400.
- Chandrashekar, V.S.; Vajpeyi, A.; Sharma, K. "Availability Of Medical Abortion Drugs In The Markets Of Four Indian States, 2018" (PDF). FRHS India. Archived (PDF) from the original on 16 May 2020.
- Chandrashekar, V.S.; Choudhuri, D.; Vajpeyi, A. (2020). "Availability of Medical Abortion Drugs in the Markets of Six Indian States" (PDF). FRHS India.
- Rastogi, Anubha; Chandrashekar, Raunaq (28 September 2019). "Assessing the Judiciary's Role in Access to Safe Abortion: An Analysis of Supreme Court and High Court Judgements in India from June 2016–April 2019" (PDF). Archived (PDF) from the original on 26 May 2020.
- Rastogi, Anubha (23 September 2020). "Assessing the Judiciary's Role in Access to Safe Abortion II: An Analysis of Supreme Court and High Court Judgements in India from May 2019-August 2020" (PDF). Archived (PDF) from the original on 21 October 2020.
- Chandrasekaran, Sruthi; Chandrashekar, V. S.; Dalvie, Suchitra; Sinha, Anand (10 January 2022). "The case for the use of telehealth for abortion in India". Sexual and Reproductive Health Matters. 29 (2) 1920566. doi:10.1080/26410397.2021.1920566. PMC 8183532. PMID 34078249.
- "Compromised Abortion Access due to COVID-19: A model to determine impact of COVID-19 on women's access to abortion". www.ipasdevelopmentfoundation.org. Ipas Development Foundation. 28 May 2020. Archived from the original on 12 August 2021.
- Chandrashekar, V.S.; Sagar, A. (May 2020). "Impact of COVID 19 on India's Family Planning Program" (PDF). FRHS India. Archived (PDF) from the original on 27 January 2021.
- Yokoe, Ryo; Rowe, Rachel; Choudhury, Saswati Sanyal; Rani, Anjali; Zahir, Farzana; Nair, Manisha (2019). "Unsafe abortion and abortion-related death among 1.8 million women in India". BMJ Global Health. 4 (3) e001491. doi:10.1136/bmjgh-2019-001491. ISSN 2059-7908. PMC 6509605. PMID 31139465.

== Recent news on abortion ==
- 6 February 2017, DNA: 'Mum's not the only word'
- 25 February 2017, The Hindu: 'Twenty-week abortion deadline adds more pain to rape victims'
- 27 February 2017, The Indian Express: 'The Responsibility of Choice'
- 28 March 2017, Business Standard: 'Behaviour change can improve knowledge about safe abortions'
- 31 March 2017, The Times of India: 'Give women the choice: Why the 20-week abortion limit must be relaxed in case of foetal abnormalities'
- 1 April 2017, Outlook: 'Whose Womb Is It?'
- 4 April 2017, The Indian Express: 'Medical Termination of Pregnancy Act needs changes, it can traumatize women'
- 16 April 2017, Deccan Chronicle: 'Discourse: Returning women their body'
- 11 May 2017, The Wire: 'India's Abortion Laws Need to Change and in the Pro-Choice Direction'
- 13 May 2017, Deccan Herald: 'Unfulfilled Commitment'
- 17 May 2017, The Hindu: 'Draft Medical Termination of Pregnancy (Amendment) Bill, 2014'
- 17 May 2017, Hindustan Times: 'Googling, taking abortions pills at home sounds like a bad idea, but it isn't: Study'
- 18 May 2017, The Indian Express: 'Teenage abortion: Law forces them to keep it a secret as system lacks adolescent sex education'
- 26 May 2017, The Asian Age: 'Pregnancy Act amendments on hold'
- 1 August 2017, Hindustan Times: 'Health ministry to keep amendment on allowing abortion in 24 weeks unchanged'
- 6 August 2017, The Week: '10 and Mum'
- 6 August 2017, The Week: 'Failure to Deliver'
- 7 August 2017, The Week: 'Accessible Abortion'
- 7 August 2017, The Times of India: 'Need to change law banning abortions after 20 weeks of pregnancy: Doctors'
- 25 August 2017, The Week: 'In MP, poor women bear rising costs of abortion'
- 7 September 2017, The Week: 'Abortion law: India needs a holistic approach'
- 12 September 2017, Quartz: 'Women's bodies are under attack: The alarming reality of reproductive rights in India and the US'
- 13 September 2017, The New Indian Express: 'Safe abortions still a dream in India'
- 14 September 2017, The Telegraph: 'Ticking away'
- 23 September 2017, The New Indian Express: 'Let's talk abortion'
- 24 September 2017, NDTV: 'Abortion Laws: Caught in a Time warp?'
- 27 September 2017, The Wire: 'Untangling the Legal Knots on Reproductive Rights Is a Step Towards Helping Indian Women'
- 2 October 2017, DNA: 'Ten die every day due to unsafe abortions in India'
- 5 October 2017, The Times of India: 'Abortions may be legal in India, but 60% are unsafe: Study'
- 8 October 2017, The Hindu: 'Self-managing abortions safely'
- 21 October 2017, The Print: 'MTP Act amendments: Fear of foeticide may be trumping women's reproductive rights'
- 21 October 2017, DNA: 'Aadhaar, a problem for women seeking abortions'
- 8 November 2017, Scroll: 'Government doctors are being trained to help women in India get safe and legal abortions'
- 10 November 2017, Mint: 'Abortion comes at a steep price in India'
- 25 November 2017, The Hindustan Times: 'Safe abortions: Why India needs more trained providers'
- 28 November 2017, The Week: 'AYUSH docs, paramedics may not be allowed to perform abortions'
- 5 December 2017, The Indian Express: 'What's wrong with India's abortion laws?'
- 5 December 2017, The Better India: 'Once progressive our 46-year-old abortion law needs move with the times'
- 9 December 2017, The Pioneer: 'It's time to amend our abortion law'
- 28 July 2019, The Times of India: 'Amend the MTP Act: Current version is archaic and causes needless suffering to pregnant women'
- 30 September 2019, The Quint: 'After a Week's Delay, Court Allows 26-Week Pregnant Women to Abort'
- 29 January 2020, India's cabinet passed a bill to give women more time to get an abortion which extended abortion deadline from 20 weeks up to 24 weeks.
- 13 July 2020, The Guardian: 'Women always take the brunt': India sees surge in unsafe abortion'
- 11 August 2020, Mint: 'Several states face shortage of medical abortion pills'
- 22 September 2020, Outlook: 'High courts witnessing surge in abortion cases: Report'
- 4 November 2020, The News Minute: 'How stigma over abortion denies women important legal right'
- 24 November 2020, The Telegraph India: 'Rights over prejudice: MTP amendment bill'
- 31 January 2021, The Hindu: 'Medical board on abortion 'unfeasible', says study'
- 29 January 2021, IANS live: Medical boards for access to abortion untenable: Ground Report
- 4 February 2021, The Leaflet: 'Medical Boards under MTP Bill will make Abortion Inaccessible'
- 11 February 2021, The Hindu: 'Denying women the right over their bodies'
- 16 March 2021, The Hindu: 'Parliament proceedings | Rajya Sabha passes the Medical Termination of Pregnancy Bill'
- 7 April 2021, The Hindu: 'Abortion is a woman's right to decide'
- 29 December 2023, The Hindu: 'After 2 years, Delhi to notify amendments to Medical Termination of Pregnancy Act'

== See also ==
- Abortion-rights movements
- Feminism in India
- Rape in India
- Women in India
