= Kamala Chandrakirana =

Feminist human rights activist (born 1960)

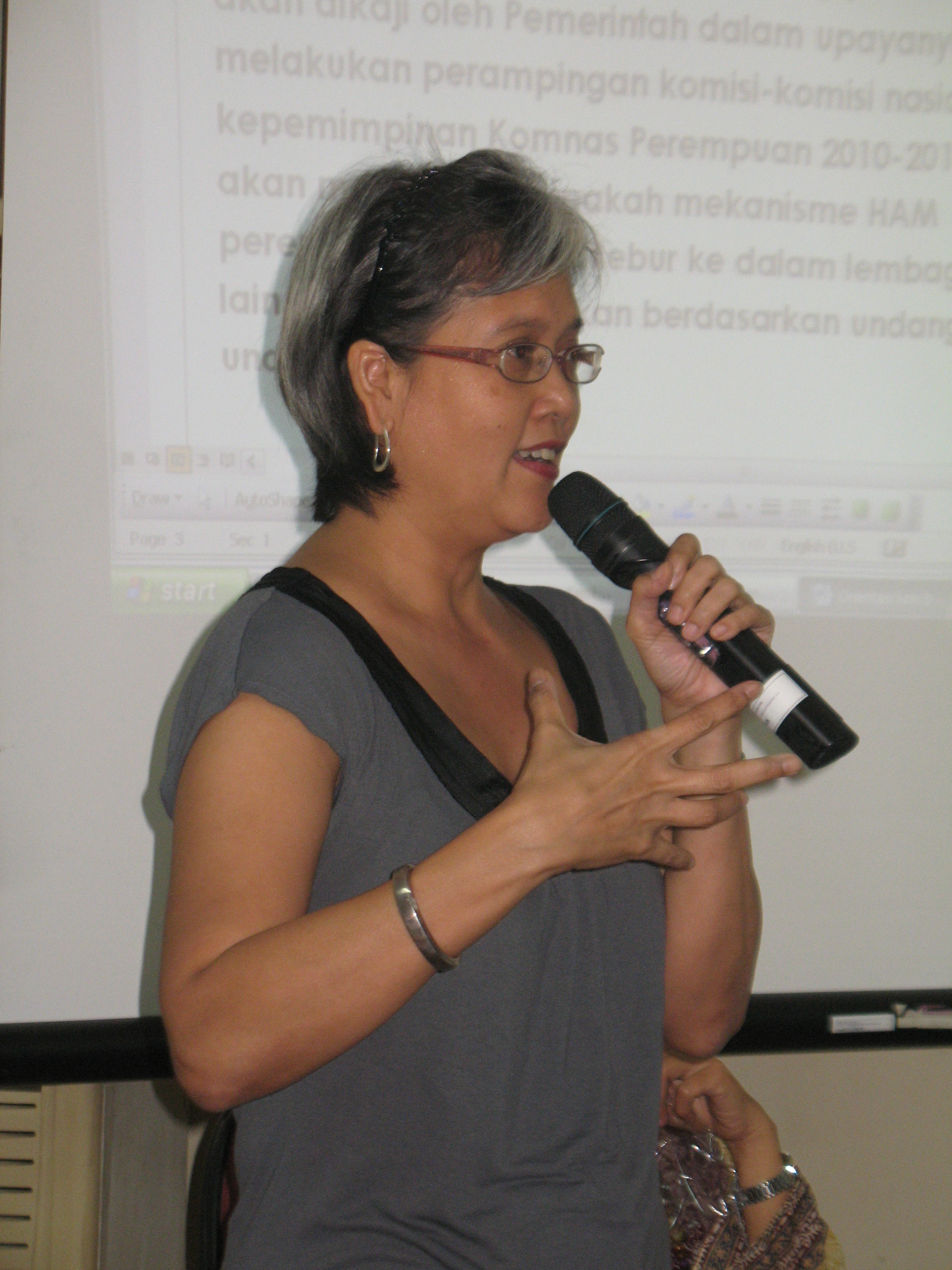
Chandrakirana speaks at Komnas Perempuan (National Commission for Violence Against Women) 2009 strategic planning meeting

Kamala (or Nana) Chandrakirana (born 1960) is a feminist human rights activist for justice and democracy from Indonesia. She has been a member of the United Nations Working Group on discrimination against women in law and practice since 2011. She spent over a decade founding and serving Indonesia's National Commission on Violence Against Women, the country's primary mechanism for women's human rights. She was first Secretary General from 1998 to 2003, then Chairperson from 2003 to 2009. In 2009, she co-founded Musawah, a "global movement for equality and justice in the Muslim family", with other activists, academics and progressive religious scholars.

== Work ==
Chandrakirana has worked on issues of women's human rights, social justice and democracy for over two decades. She has helped build networks and coalitions, strengthened formal human rights mechanisms both in Indonesia and the United Nations, and supported activist engagement across Indonesia, the Asia Pacific region and globally.

During Indonesia's conflict-ridden period of 2003–2009, Chandrakirana chaired the National Commission on Violence Against Women, which documented critical violations of women's human rights, including in Aceh, Papua, Poso (Central Sulawesi), as well as the rapes of May 1998 and the killings of 1965.

Apart from her time as member of the United Nations Working Group on Discrimination against women in law and practice, Chandrakirana has served in other positions in the United Nations system, as a women's human rights expert. She was a member of the ESCAP-UN Women's Asia Pacific Regional Working Group on Women, Peace and Security. Chandrakirana has been associated with a number of regional networks in the Asia Pacific, including the Asia Pacific Forum on Women, Law and Development (APWLD), International Women's Rights Action Watch, Asia Pacific (IWRAW AP), the Southeast Asian Women's Caucus on ASEAN, and Musawah, the global movement for equality and justice in the Muslim family.
