= Adultery law in India =

Adultery was a criminal offence under Chapter XX of the Indian Penal Code until it was quashed by the Supreme Court of India on 27 September 2018 as unconstitutional. The law dated from 1860. Under Section 497 of the Indian Penal Code, which was the section dealing with adultery, a man who had consensual sexual intercourse with the wife of another man without that husband's consent or connivance could have been punished for this offence with up to five years imprisonment, a fine or both. As such, the concept of adultery targeted the act of sexual intercourse occurring between a married woman and a man other than her husband, in which case the man would be guilty whereas the wife was exempt from punishment. When a married man had sexual intercourse with an unmarried woman, no party was punishable; while if a married man had sexual intercourse with a married woman other than his wife, the married man's crime was against the husband of that married woman, not against the man's own wife towards whom he had been unfaithful. Adultery was only prosecutable upon the complaint of the aggrieved husband (or in exceptional circumstances by a party whom the husband had entrusted with the care of his wife).

The Supreme Court called the law unconstitutional because it "treats a husband as the sole master." However it is still a sufficient ground for divorce as ruled by the Supreme Court.

== Legislation ==
The adultery law, at the time of its constitutional challenge, read as follows:

Section 497 : Adultery

Whoever has sexual intercourse with a person who is and whom he knows or has reason to believe to be the wife of another man, without the consent or connivance of that man, such sexual intercourse not amounting to the offence of rape, is guilty of the offence of adultery, and shall be punished with imprisonment of either description for a term which may extend to five years, or with fine, or with both. In such case the wife shall not be punishable as an abettor.

With regard to prosecution, the law read: "198. Prosecution for offences against marriage.—(1) No Court shall take cognizance of an offence punishable under Chapter XX of the Indian Penal Code (45 of 1860) except upon a complaint made by some person aggrieved by the offence. [...] (2) For the purposes of sub-section (1), no person other than the husband of the woman shall be deemed to be aggrieved by any offence punishable under section 497 or section 498 of the said Code: Provided that in the absence of the husband, some person who had care of the woman on his behalf at the time when such offence was committed may, with the leave of the Court, make a complaint on his behalf."

== Petition to decriminalise Section 497 ==
Because of this problematic interpretation, the Supreme Court in December 2017 decided to accept the public interest litigation (PIL) petition brought forth by Joseph Shine, in which the abolition of Section 497 of the Indian Penal Code was sought.

It has been argued that the section violates two articles of the Constitution of India- Article 14 and Article 15.

Article 14 reads as follows: "The State shall not deny to any person equality before the law or the equal protection of the laws within the territory of India."

Article 15 reads as follows: "The State shall not discriminate against any citizen on grounds only of religion, race, caste, sex, place of birth or any of them."

On accepting this petition, the Court in its initial observations noted that this was not the first petition challenging the section - debates and cases on this have been in motion since 1954, making it important for the Court to decide on this question without much ado. It felt that laws are supposed to be gender neutral. However, in this case, it merely makes the woman a victim and thus "creates a dent on the individual independent identity of the woman."

The arguments by the party opposing this decriminalisation- the Centre- states that the section "supports, safeguards and protects the institution of marriage... Stability of marriages is not an ideal to be scorned." It further argues that if the petition is allowed, then "adulterous relations will have more free play than now." As an alternative, it provides that the recommendations of the Committee on Reforms of Criminal Justice System (2003) be implemented. This committee recommended that the wording of the section be changed to: "Whoever has sexual intercourse with the spouse of any other person is guilty of adultery..." to tackle the problem of gender bias which arises from the reading of the current section.

== Judgement ==
The Court began to hear the arguments on this petition on 1 August 2018. The Court said that if the party challenging this section can simply prove that it violates Article 14 of the Constitution of India, then the section will be struck down.

A five-judge Constitution bench of the Supreme Court unanimously ruled on 27 September 2018 to repeal Section 497, thus eliminating it as an offence in India.

While reading the judgment, Chief Justice Dipak Misra said, "it (adultery) cannot be a criminal offence," however it can be a ground for civil issues like divorce.

In October 2017, Joseph Shine, a non-resident Keralite, filed public interest litigation under Article 32 of the Constitution. The petition challenged the constitutionality of the offence of adultery under Section 497 of the IPC read with Section 198(2) of the CrPC.

Section 497 IPC criminalised adultery by imposing culpability on a man who engages in sexual intercourse with another person's wife. Adultery was punishable with a maximum imprisonment of five years. Women, including consenting parties, were exempted from prosecution. Further, a married woman could not bring forth a complaint under Section 497 IPC when her husband engaged in sexual intercourse with an unmarried woman. This was in view of Section 198(2) of CrPC which specified how a complainant can file charges for offenses committed under Sections 497 and 498 IPC.

Advocate Jayna Kothari, executive director of CLPR, represented the intervenor Vimochana. She assailed the provision which categorised adultery as an offence by invoking the fundamental right to privacy, as recognised by the Supreme Court in the Puttaswamy case. She argued that the right to intimate association is a facet of privacy that is protected under the Constitution.

Section 497 was unconstitutional as the very basis for criminalising adultery was the assumption that a woman is considered as property of the husband and cannot have relations outside of marriage. The same restrictions, however, did not apply in the case of the husband. Section 497 violates the right to privacy as well as the liberty of women by discriminating against married women and perpetuating gender stereotypes.

On 27 September 2018, a 5 Judge Bench of the Supreme Court unanimously struck down Section 497 of the Indian Penal Code as being violative of Articles 14. 15 & 21 of the Constitution.

== See also ==
- Child marriage in India
- Divorce in India
- Polygyny in India
