= Ernst Kaiser =

Austrian writer

Ernst David Kaiser (3 October 1911 – 1 January 1972) was an Austrian writer and translator.

== Early life ==
Ernst David Kaiser was born in Vienna. His father, a Jewish merchant, came from the Slovak part of Hungary, and his mother from Brno. At birth he was Hungarian, but his father later opted to be Austrian. Ernst Kaiser grew up in Vienna, attended high school, passed the Matura, did his military service and studied German. Austria was annexed by the German Reich on 12 March 1938, before he was able to complete his doctorate. A few months later Kaiser fled to Poland via Prague and from there by ship to Southampton in the United Kingdom. He settled in London. He found a job in a slaughterhouse where he dragged pork and sides of beef in cold storage. When the war began Kaiser was interned "and then served for almost six years in the British Army in France, Belgium, Holland, Germany; afterwards in the military government in Hamburg as an interpreter with the rank of sergeant." Later, he wrote that he had fought against Germany in Germany.

In Petersfield in 1941, he married Eithne Wilkins (1914–75), a Germanic Studies scholar, translator and poet from New Zealand, and the sister of Nobel laureate Maurice Wilkins.

== Postwar period ==
Kaiser's first book, Schattenmann, a novella, was published in Hamburg in 1946 by the Hans Dulk publishing house. By 1947, they were living in London; Kaiser had gained British citizenship and Eithne Wilkins worked as a lecturer at the University of London.

Kaiser applied to the Bollingen Foundation in New York in 1947 for a grant to write the second part of his novel Die Geschichte eines Mordes. The writer Hermann Broch examined the first 480 pages of the manuscript for the Foundation. Broch was full of praise and recommended promoting Kaiser. He was aware that it would be difficult to find a publisher for the bulky book. He made the suggestion of founding a library for collecting manuscripts worth publishing, for which no publisher can initially be found, so that they are not forgotten or lost.

Despite Broch's efforts, the Foundation refused to support Kaiser. He wrote the second part of his novel without funding, as well as a series of novellas and short stories in the following years. Together with his wife he translated books from German into English. They are regarded as exceptionally good translators who worked for top publishers in the United States and the United Kingdom. They translated authors such as Robert Musil, Goethe, Kafka, Lion Feuchtwanger, Ernst Wiechert, Kokoschka, Ingeborg Bachmann, Heimito von Doderer and Siegfried Lenz, as well as letters by Gustav Mahler and Arnold Schoenberg.

== Musil translation and scholarship ==
On 28 October 1949 Kaiser and Wilkins published a front page essay about Musil in the Times Literary Supplement, praising him as "the most important novelist writing in German in this half-century". Their translations of several works of Robert Musil were groundbreaking, including The Man Without Qualities, which they not only translated, but also edited in a new version for the estate. Their work on Robert Musil was their main activity after 1950; they published numerous articles on Musil's work in journals and anthologies, including the 1962 extensive volume Robert Musil. Eine Einführung in das Werk in Stuttgart.

Their relationship with the Bollingen Foundation became helpful. In the period from 1954 to 1965, Kaiser and Wilkins were able to live in Rome for a total of eleven years thanks to several grants from the foundation to view and evaluate Musil's estate. Their findings led to a several years-long disagreement with Adolf Frisé, who had published a complete edition of the works of Robert Musil through Rowohlt. Frisé had not included some texts from the Musil estate in Rome. After intense public discourse and publication of an English translation of the novel by Kaiser and Wilkins, Rowohlt issued a new edition. In Die Zeit from 21 April 1967, one could read: "The long-standing arguments about the Musil edition, fueled by the inheritance investigations by Eithne Kaiser-Wilkins and Ernst Kaiser, have finally found a happy ending. The Rowohlt publishing house announced that a new edition of his works was now being tackled. 1968 appear ... and the new edition of "The Man Without Qualities" prepared by Frisé in association with the Kaisers ... So that it seems as if one of the few outstanding German writers of this century would come up with a proper edition of his work after all."

Kaiser and Wilkins also played a key role in the relocation of Robert Musil's estate from Rome to Austria, where these materials are now archived in the Austrian National Library.

== Attempts to publish Die Geschichte eines Mordes ==
Ernst Kaiser tried several times to get his second book, Die Geschichte eines Mordes, published by German publishers. Friends, like the Germanist Wilhelm Bausinger, tried to support him. The manuscript lay with Suhrkamp Verlag for almost three years, where they signalled their willingness to publish it several times. Kaiser was asked, however, to significantly shorten the text. He refused; not because he didn't want to make any cuts, but because he felt that the work had to be "made objectively usable". He hoped "es lebe ein Gott zu kürzen und zu straffen". In November 1960, Suhrkamp returned the manuscript without comment. Kaiser then sent the manuscript to Heinrich Maria Ledig-Rowohlt, with whom he had been in personal contact for three years regarding the revision of the Musil edition. Ledig-Rowohlt initially considered the prospect of the novel being published, but also insisted on cuts. In a letter to Bausinger, Kaiser agreed; however, he explained to Ledig-Rowohlt that he could not carry out the revision. First, it has been ten years since he completed the work; he was not in a position to find his way back into his text in time and secondly, the novel came from a period of life that he had completed and to which he did not want to return. However, he gave the publisher free rein to cut, even to cut significantly. Kaiser was all the more astonished when his manuscript was returned by a publisher's secretary two months later without any comment.

The writer Ingrid Bachér, who now lives in Düsseldorf, lived in Rome in the first half of the 1960s. She got to know Kaiser and Wilkins and a friendship developed. She also offered to present Die Geschichte eines Mordes to her publishers. Ernst Kaiser also gave her free rein to revise the text. Their efforts were also unsuccessful at the time. Bachér returned to Germany and Ernst Kaiser and his wife moved back to Great Britain in 1966. Eithne Kaiser-Wilkins received a professorship at the University of Reading in the spring of 1968. Kaiser was made an honorary research fellow and headed the Musil Research Unit at the university with his wife. The Kaisers stayed in touch with Bachér by letter.

In 1969 Ernst Kaiser published a second book, the Paracelsus book in Rowohlt's Monographien series. It is currently not known why the author was interested in Paracelsus. It may have been a commissioned work for the publisher, made for purely financial reasons.

== Vanished estate ==
On 1 January 1972 Ernst Kaiser died in Reading. Just two years later, at the end of 1974, Eithne Kaiser-Wilkins also died. A short time later, Kaiser-Wilkins' former assistant at the university contacted Ingrid Bachér and wrote that the Kaisers had ordered all of Ernst Kaiser's manuscripts to be handed over to Bachér, with the request that she try to publish them. Bachér promptly replied that she was willing to take on the texts. However, the texts never arrived. All attempts to clarify the whereabouts of the package were unsuccessful and the assistant could no longer be reached. There was no Kaiser estate in Reading and Eithne Wilkins' brother refused to provide any information. The texts by the writer Ernst David Kaiser were considered lost. In one of her novels, Ingrid Bachér wrote about the fate of Kaiser and his manuscripts. The unknown author thus became a literary figure.

Bachér reported on Ernst Kaiser, his wife and his missing texts at two forums of the Else Lasker-Schüler Society. In 2001, a young man approached her and offered to do some research. In the Deutsches Literaturarchiv Marbach there were numerous references to Kaiser, correspondence with writers, trade journals and publishers. Hermann Bausinger had also handed over to the archive, as part of his legacy, the legacy of his brother Wilhelm, who had died in an accident in 1966. This includes an extensive correspondence between Wilhelm Bausinger and Ernst Kaiser and Eithne Kaiser-Wilkins. In addition, there are also manuscripts by Kaiser in the Bausinger inventory, including a carbon copy of a typewritten manuscript of the novel Die Geschichte eines Mordes, totaling over 1,000 pages, the first part of which is titled "Das große Haus".

Bachér went to Marbach and read the text "Das große Haus" and many letters between Kaiser and Bausinger in the archive. She had the manuscript copied and looked for a publisher. Again for years it was not possible to persuade a publisher to print the novel Die Geschichte eines Mordes. And this despite the fact that great interest in a publication was signalled again and again. It was not until the spring of 2008 that she found two who were willing to publish the novel through personal acquaintance with the publisher Ralf Liebe and his program director Helmut Braun. After reading the entire manuscript, Braun suggested publishing the first part of the text as Die Geschichte eines Mordes. Since the second part, "Das weiße Haus", is far removed from the narrative of the first part and the only continuity is the character of the protagonist, it is justified to speak of two novels that can be published separately. Ingrid Bachér took it upon herself, as promised at the time, to "make the text objectively usable" in Kaiser's sense, to "tighten and shorten" it. She did this carefully and without stylistic interference. The necessary transcription - the creation of a file - and its correction led to a careful alignment with our current spelling and punctuation without affecting the peculiarities of Kaiser's spelling. There is now a "readable text" that tells of a man who becomes surreally embroiled in a murder case, falling into a trap of reality and fiction.

Kaiser's literary archive is now with a niece of Eithne Wilkins, in London. The archive includes unpublished manuscripts, correspondence and original artwork.

== Bibliography ==
- Schattenmann (Verlag Hans Dulk, 1946)
- with Eithne Wilkins: Robert Musil: Eine Einführung in das Werk (Kohlhammer, Stuttgart, 1962)
- Die Geschichte eines Mordes (Liebe, Weilerswist 2010, ISBN 978-3-941037-21-2)

=== Translations with Eithne Wilkins ===
- Ernst Wiechert: The Girl and the Ferryman (1947)
- Goethe: Truth and Fantasy from My Life: A Selection (1949)
- Robert Musil: The Man Without Qualities (in three volumes: 1953, 1955, 1961)
- Franz Kafka: Dearest Father. Stories and Other Writings (1954)
- Robert Musil: Young Törless (1955)
- Lion Feuchtwanger: Raquel, the Jewess of Toledo (1956)
- Lion Feuchtwanger: Jephthah and His Daughter (1958)
- Oskar Kokoschka: A Sea Ringed with Visions (1962)
- Ingeborg Bachmann: "Everything" (1962), from Das dreißigste Jahr
- Robert Musil: Tonka and Other Stories (1965), translations of Drei Frauen and Vereinigungen, later reprinted as Five Women
- Heimito von Doderer: The Waterfalls of Slunj (1966)
- Siegfried Lenz: The German Lesson (1971)

== Sources ==
- Gerhard Renner: Die Nachlässe in den Bibliotheken und Museen der Republik Österreich [...]. Wien, Köln, Weimar 1993, S. 189; Österreichisches Nachlaßgesamtverzeichnis ÖNB (Wien)
- Christian Rogowski: Distinguished Outsider: Robert Musil and His Critics (Harvard, 1994)
- Wolfgang Schmitz: Ernst David Kaiser und die Geschichte eines Mordes : literarische Wertung; Recherche zu Leben und Werk; Textauszüge, Köln: Univ.- und Stadtbibliothek, 2012, ISBN 978-3-931596-70-5
