= Frise =

Frise may refer to:

- Frise (department), the French name of Friesland as a département of the First French Empire
- Frise, Somme, a commune of the Somme department in France
- Leslie Frise (1895-1979), British aerospace engineer and aircraft designer
- Maria Frisé (1926-2022), German journalist and author
  - Aileron#Frise ailerons, a type of aircraft part
