= Maria Frisé =

German journalist and author (1926–2022)

- Born: Maria von Loesch; 1 January 1926; Breslau, Lower Silesia, Prussia, Germany
- Died: 31 July 2022 (aged 96); Bad Homburg, Hesse, Germany
- Other name: Maria Stahlberg
- Occupations: Journalist; Author
- Organization: Frankfurter Allgemeine Zeitung
- Spouses: Hans-Conrad Stahlberg (m. 1945–1957) Adolf Frisé (m. 1957; died 2003)
- Children: 3

Maria Frisé (née von Loesch; 1 January 1926 – 31 July 2022) was a German journalist and author. Her journalistic work consisted primarily of features and reviews, covering the arts and fringe political issues. She was a member of the staff of the Frankfurter Allgemeine Zeitung (FAZ) from 1968 to 1991, working for the paper until her death. She was also the author of short stories, essays, poetry and autobiographical works about her childhood and family in Silesia.

== Life ==
Maria von Loesch, the second of her parents' three recorded children, was born in Breslau (now Wrocław, Poland) on 1 January 1926. Ernst Heinrich von Loesch (1885–1945), her father was a land owner; and she grew up in Schloss Lorzendorf, the crenelated manor house at the heart of the family estates surrounding Lorzendorf, in the flatlands of Lower Silesia. Her mother, born Martha von Boyneburgk (1894–1943), was a member of the aristocratic Zedlitz und Trützschler family. Field Marshal Erich von Manstein was married to her father's first cousin, born Jutta-Sibylle von Loesch. Prussian military values ran in the blood, and while her parents had no time either for the post-1918 republican government or for the National Socialists who took power in 1933, she grew up steeped in the "nationalist patriotism" associated with late nineteenth century imperialism.

She passed her Reifeprüfung when she was 18, in 1944, by which time there was a growing conviction that Germany would soon end up on the losing side in another World War. She married her cousin, Hans-Conrad Stahlberg (1914–1987), on 18 January 1945, at her family estate but with the Red Army approaching. After the civil ceremony at the town hall, one of the guests, Maria's uncle, the recently dismissed Field Marshal Erich von Manstein, drove in his car to the nearby town to buy some fabric, returning with the grim report received from an army officer he had come across that the rest of German army had evacuated the area and a Soviet "tank spearhead" approximately ten kilometers to the east was likely to "thrust towards the Oder" before the day ended. The celebrants went ahead with the church ceremony, but there was no time for lengthy speeches at the banquet that had been laid out for the evening. After a quick toast, as the rattling of moving tanks could be heard echoing in the distance to the east, the message came through on the telephone that there was still time to catch the last train to Breslau. Everything, including the wedding feast, was left to be enjoyed by the incoming Soviet soldiers. The wedding party squeezed into and onto the available cars, trucks and sleds, before heading for the local train station. Somehow space was found between the wounded war casualties who filled the carriages. The order for civilians to evacuate Breslau came through four days later, on 22 January 1945, and the westward flight continued. As they started the journey, Stahlberg was an army officer, but they soon became just two among hundreds of anonymous homeless refugees trying to get away from the fighting. They stopped off at Lüneburg Heath and briefly took refuge with von Manstein. (Note: Although several sources describe von Manstein as Maria's Frisé uncle, he had actually, in 1920, married Jutta-Sibylle von Loesch (1900–1966), who was a first cousin of Maria's father. They shared two grand-parents but not their parents. That makes von Manstein the husband of Maria's first cousin once removed, in the eyes of genealogy pedants.) They then detoured north, ending up in Hamburg and Schleswig-Holstein where the couple made their home for the next twelve years.

By 1952, Maria Stahlberg had given birth to the couple's three sons, whom she looked after while her husband built a successful business career. News came through that her father had died of diphtheria back in 1945 in a refugee camp at Hoyerswerda, in what had become the Soviet occupation zone. After her mother had died Maria had also taken on guardianship responsibilities for her much younger sister Christine. The marriage lasted for twelve years. In 1957 she married again, the author and journalist Adolf Frisé (1910–2003), who helped her break in to the world of culture. Leaving her first husband meant leaving her sons: she later told an interviewer that she had written to them "almost every day". Adolf Frisé worked on editing the literary estate of Robert Musil at the time, and she became a collaborator for several editions of Musil's works, including the first critical edition of Der Mann ohne Eigenschaften, diaries and letters. She also began to contribute to journalism in newspapers and radio broadcasts. Her first book, a collection of stories (Erzählungen), was printed in 1966 by Rowohlt, titled Hühnertag und andere Geschichten (Chicken day and other stories).

In 1968, Maria Frisé joined the staff of the Frankfurter Allgemeine Zeitung as a contributing editor, working on the feuilleton. She was operating in a milieu in which women were still rare. There were 152 contributing editors of whom 142 were men. (By 2019, in contrast, 302 of the paper's 402 contributing editors were men.) The office was nevertheless already familiar to her, since she had been visiting – at times two or three times in a week – to deliver and discuss contributions while working "as a freelancer" since the late 1950s. The staff were housed in a cramped building incongruously located in a commercial district of Frankfurt where used-car show rooms and tyre-fitting stations seem to have predominated. The first day she arrived for work, there was, initially, nowhere to sit; since the sick colleague, whose desk had temporarily been assigned in the "Feuilleton" department for the new staffer, had unexpectedly returned to work. Nor was the initial salary of 1,000 marks per month generous: she had often earned three times as much as a free-lance journalist. She seemed at the time more or less to have accepted that the salary disparity arose because she had no university degree, rather than having to do with her gender. Nevertheless, there was much about the security of the permanent post that suited her, and she remained on the FAZ staff till 1991, writing articles until her death.

She published a successful autobiographical book, Eine schlesische Kindheit (A Silesian childhood), in 1990, followed by others, including in 2004 Meine schlesische Familie und ich (My Silesian family and I). She also wrote about family as a social group, such as Auskunft über das Leben zu zweit (Information on life in pairs), written at age 90. A story collection was planned to be published in 2021, Einer liebt immer mehr (Someone always loves more). She kept writing articles for the FAZ, seven of them during her last 12 months.

Frisé and her husband lived in Bad Homburg where she remained after his death in 2003. She was a centre of the community there, and remained a dedicated horse rider into her 90s. She died on 31 July 2022 at the age of 96.

== Awards ==
- 1991 Hedwig Dohm Award from the Association of women journalists. The prize was inaugurated in 1991, so Frisé was the first recipient.
- 1994 Andreas Gryphius Prize, Ehrengabe (Award of Honor)
- 1996 Kulturpreis Schlesien des Landes Niedersachsen, (Silesia culture prize from Lower Saxony)

== Works ==
Frisé's works are held by the German National Library, including:

- Hühnertag und andere Geschichten, Reinbek 1966 DNB-IDN 456673806
- Erbarmen mit den Männern, Reinbek 1983 ISBN 978-3-499-15175-0
- Montagsmänner und andere Frauengeschichten, Frankfurt 1986 ISBN 978-3-596-23782-1
- Eine schlesische Kindheit, Deutsche Verlagsanstalt, Stuttgart 1990, ISBN 3-499-33187-X
- Allein – mit Kind, Munich, 1992 (with Jürgen Stahlberg) ISBN 978-3-492-03501-9
- Wie du und ganz anders, Frankfurt 1994 ISBN 978-3-596-11826-7
- Liebe, lebenslänglich, Frankfurt 1998 ISBN 978-3-596-14207-1
- Meine schlesische Familie und ich: Erinnerungen, Berlin 2004 ISBN 978-3-351-02577-9
- Familientag, Berlin 2005 ISBN 978-3-7466-2133-3
- Auskünfte über das Leben zu zweit. Fischer, Frankfurt am Main 2015, ISBN 978-3-596-23758-6
- Einer lebt immer. Erzählungen. Literareon, Munich 2021, ISBN 978-3-8316-2269-6
