= Eithne Wilkins =

New Zealand scholar, translator and poet (1914–1975)

Eithne Wilkins (born Ethne Una Lilian Wilkins; 12 September 1914 – 13 March 1975) was a Germanic Studies scholar, translator and poet from New Zealand.

== Life and work ==
She was born in Wellington to Edgar Wilkins, an Irish doctor, and his wife Eveline (Whittaker); her younger brother was the Nobel laureate Maurice Wilkins. In 1923, when she was almost nine, she moved to Dublin with her family and shortly after they moved again to London, followed again by a move to Birmingham, where her father started work as a school doctor.

She studied languages and literature at Somerville College, Oxford and later worked as a journalist and translator in London and Paris before World War II. During the war, she taught at the Emanuel School, which evacuated to Petersfield in 1939.

From the mid-1930s to the late 1950s, Wilkins wrote poetry, publishing about 40 poems in various literary journals, including the poetic sequence "Oranges and Lemons". Several of her poems were included in Kenneth Rexroth's anthology The New British Poets, published by New Directions in 1949.

In 1941 in Petersfield, she married the Austrian writer and translator Ernst Kaiser. They collaborated together on translations and the study of the works of Robert Musil, including the first English translation of The Man Without Qualities.

In 1953 she had a research fellowship at Bedford College in London, then went to Rome with Kaiser on a grant from the Bollingen Foundation to study Musil's estate. In 1967, she was appointed as a professor at the University of Reading and established the Musil Research Unit with her husband.

Eithne Wilkins died in 1975.

== Bibliography ==
=== Nonfiction ===
- Robert Musil. Eine Einführung in das Werk, with Ernst Kaiser (1962),
- The Rose-Garden Game: The Symbolic Background to the European Prayerbeads (Gollancz, 1969)

=== Translations ===
- Louis Aragon: Aurelien (1947)
- René Barjavel: The Tragic Innocents (1948)
- Maxence Van der Meersch: Bodies and Souls (1948)
- Honoré de Balzac: A Bachelor's Establishment (1952)
- Haroun Tazieff: Craters of Fire (1952), translation of Cratères en feu
- Bruno Erich Werner: The Slave Ship (1953), translation of Die Galeere
- Alphonse Daudet: Sappho: A Picture of Life in Paris (1951)

=== Translations with Ernst Kaiser ===
- Ernst Wiechert: The Girl and the Ferryman (1947)
- Goethe: Truth and Fantasy from My Life: A Selection (1949)
- Robert Musil: The Man Without Qualities (in three volumes: 1953, 1955, 1961)
- Franz Kafka: Dearest Father. Stories and Other Writings (1954)
- Robert Musil: Young Törless (1955)
- Lion Feuchtwanger: Raquel, the Jewess of Toledo (1956)
- Lion Feuchtwanger: Jephthah and His Daughter (1958)
- Oskar Kokoschka: A Sea Ringed with Visions (1962)
- Ingeborg Bachmann: "Everything" (1962), from Das dreißigste Jahr
- Robert Musil: Tonka and Other Stories (1965), translations of Drei Frauen and Vereinigungen, later reprinted as Five Women
- Heimito von Doderer: The Waterfalls of Slunj (1966)
- Siegfried Lenz: The German Lesson (1971)
