= Leinsdorf =

Leinsdorf may refer to:

- Erich Leinsdorf, Austrian conductor
- Count Leinsdorf, a character in Robert Musil's novel The Man Without Qualities
