= Karl-Otto Alberty =

German actor (1933–2015)

Karl-Otto Alberty (also Karl Otto Alberty, 13 November 1933 – 25 April 2015) was a German actor. He was variously credited as Charles Albert, Charles Alberty and Carlo Alberti.

== Career ==
Alberty was born as Karl-Otto Poensgen in Berlin on 13 November 1933. He started out as an amateur boxer before discovering a talent for acting, making his début at the City Theatre in Konstanz in 1959.

He then began to take supporting roles in films. He made his first appearance in English language films as an SD officer (who captures Richard Attenborough) in The Great Escape (1963). With his broad face, broken nose and distinctive white-blond hair, he would go on to play variations of the role of German officers in a series of films, notably Battle of the Bulge (1965), Andrew V. McLaglen's The Devil's Brigade (1968), Luchino Visconti's The Damned (1969), and as a Waffen-SS tank commander of a Tiger I tank from the 1st SS Panzer Division LSSAH in Kelly's Heroes (1970). He played a Luftwaffe general in Battle of Britain (1969).

He also continued to work in both Germany and Italy in a wide variety of films from dramas and comedies to spaghetti westerns. He also made regular appearances on German television. His last appearance was in the TV series War and Remembrance in 1989.

Alberty died on 25 April 2015, at the age of 81.

== Selected filmography ==
- Und sowas nennt sich Leben (1961) - Bob
- Der Transport (1961)
- Denn das Weib ist schwach (1961) - Kovacz
- The Phony American (1961)
- Barras heute (1963) - Staff Sergeant Knorr
- The Great Escape (1963) - S.S. Lieutenant Steinach
- Time of the Innocent (1964)
- Oklahoma John (1965) - Hondo
- The House in Karp Lane (1965) - Leopold Glaser
- Battle of the Bulge (1965) - Maj. Von Diepel
- Is Paris Burning? (1966) - S.S. Officer - Bayeux Tapestry
- Day of Anger (1967) - Blonde Deputy with Harmonica
- Assignment K (1968) - Fake Policeman (uncredited)
- L'Odissea (TV miniseries, 1968) - Eurimaco
- The Devil's Brigade (1968) - German Officer (uncredited)
- Midas Run (1969) - Mark Dietrich
- On the Reeperbahn at Half Past Midnight (1969) - Hotte Priemel
- Battle of Britain (1969) - General Hans Jeschonnek, Luftwaffe Chief of Staff
- Help Me, My Love (1969) - Bauer, the choreographer
- The Damned (1969) - 1st Wehrmacht Officer
- The Secret of Santa Vittoria (1969) - Otto
- Kelly's Heroes (1970) - German Tank Commander
- Angels with Burnt Wings (1970) - second Commissar
- The Great White Hope (1970) - Hans
- The Lickerish Quartet (1970) - Bit Part (uncredited)
- Raid on Rommel (1971) - Capt. Heinz Schroeder
- Slaughterhouse-Five (1972) - German Guard - Group Two
- Assignment: Munich (1972) - Fritz
- Bluebeard (1972) - Von Sepper's Friend
- The Salzburg Connection (1972) - First Stocky Man
- The Assassination (1972)
- Ein Käfer gibt Vollgas (1972) - Marchese de la Sotta
- Flatfoot in Egypt (1980) - The Swede
- Die Insel der blutigen Plantage (1983) - Otto Globocnik
- The Winds of War (TV miniseries, 1983) - White-Haired Gestapo
- War and Remembrance (TV miniseries, 1988) - Scharführer Rudolf Haindl (final appearance)
