= The Tragic Innocents =

1946 novel by René Barjavel

- First edition
- Author: René Barjavel
- Original title: Tarendol
- Translator: Eithne Wilkins
- Cover artist: J. Buckland-Wright
- Language: French
- Publisher: Éditions Denoël
- Publication date: 1946
- Publication place: France
- English publication date: 1948 Hamish Hamilton
- Pages: 425

The Tragic Innocents (French: Tarendol) is a 1946 novel by the French writer René Barjavel. It tells the story of two teenagers, Jean Tarendol and Marie Margherite, who fall in love in occupied France during World War II. The story is set in an imaginary region inspired by the author's native Drôme. The book was published in English in 1948, translated by Eithne Wilkins.

== Reception ==
Kirkus Reviews wrote: "This is a story of young love, set in war-time France, poetic, passionately written, with much of beauty -- and yet with an aura of unreality, which perhaps is intentional, in keeping with the mood of the lovers. ... An odd blend of sophistication, of Gallic outspokenness, with a simplicity, almost a naivete, makes this unique in its field. Beautifully translated by Eithne Wilkins, the English text loses nothing of the grace of language."

== Adaptation ==
The novel was adapted into a 1980 television serial with the same title directed by Louis Grospierre. The serial ran in four episodes starring Jacques Penot as Jean, Florence Pernel as Marie and Daniel Gélin as Bazalo.
