= Solo für Sudmann =

German crime drama television series

- Genre: Crime drama
- Written by: Reinhard Donga
- Directed by: Thomas Nikel; Thomas Fantl
- Starring: Heinz Baumann; Esther Francksen; Veronika Faber; Kurt Weinzierl; Wilfried Klaus; Michel Guillaume
- Composer: Uve Schikora
- Country of origin: Germany
- Original language: German
- No. of seasons: 1
- No. of episodes: 12

Production
- Executive producer: António da Cunha Telles
- Cinematography: Rolf Greim; Norbert Stern
- Editor: Thea Eymèsz
- Running time: 45 minutes
- Production companies: Elan-Film Gierke & Company

Original release
- Network: ZDF
- Release: 23 January – 10 April 1997

Solo für Sudmann (English title: Solo for Sudmann) is a German crime drama television series that premiered on 23 January 1997 on ZDF. The show, which consists of one season in twelve episodes, is the first offshoot of SOKO München, launched in 1978 under the name SOKO 5113.

== Synopsis ==
After chief inspector Jürgen Sudmann—former investigator at SOKO 5113—retires, he opens a private detective agency in Munich. Together with his assistant, Susanne Wegener, he solves cases in an unconventional way. Some of his former colleagues from the special commission (SOKO) make guest appearances, including chief inspector Horst Schickl, inspectors Lizzy Berger and Manfred "Manne" Brand, and detective Theodor "Theo" Renner.

== Cast and characters ==
- Heinz Baumann as Jürgen Sudmann
- Esther Francksen as Susanne Wegener
- Veronika Faber as Johanna Naumann
- Kurt Weinzierl as Bank direktor Dreyfuss
- Wilfried Klaus as Horst Schickl
- Michel Guillaume as Theo Renner

== See also ==
- List of German television series
