= The Waterfalls of Slunj =

1963 novel by Heimito von Doderer

- Author: Heimito von Doderer
- Original title: Die Wasserfälle von Slunj
- Translator: Eithne Wilkins; Ernst Kaiser
- Language: German
- Publisher: Biederstein Verlag
- Publication date: 1963
- Publication place: West Germany
- English publication date: 1966
- Pages: 393

The Waterfalls of Slunj (German: Die Wasserfälle von Slunj) is a 1963 novel by the Austrian writer Heimito von Doderer. It is set at the turn of the 20th century and revolves around an English father and son who run a factory for agricultural machines in Vienna. It was first published by Biederstein Verlag in Munich. An English translation appeared in 1966.

Doderer wrote The Waterfalls of Slunj as the first part of a tetralogy he called Roman No. 7 (lit. 'Novel No. 7'), a reference to Ludwig van Beethoven's Symphony No. 7, and described, as a symphony in four movements. He died in 1966 without having finished any other parts. The second part, Der Grenzwald (lit. 'The Border Forest'), was published in its fragmentary state in 1967.

The Waterfalls of Slunj was the basis for a 2002 television film directed by Peter Patzak for ORF. A stage adaptation by Nicolaus Hagg premiered at the 2025 Festspiele Reichenau.

== See also ==
- Slunj
