= Piersławek =

- Village
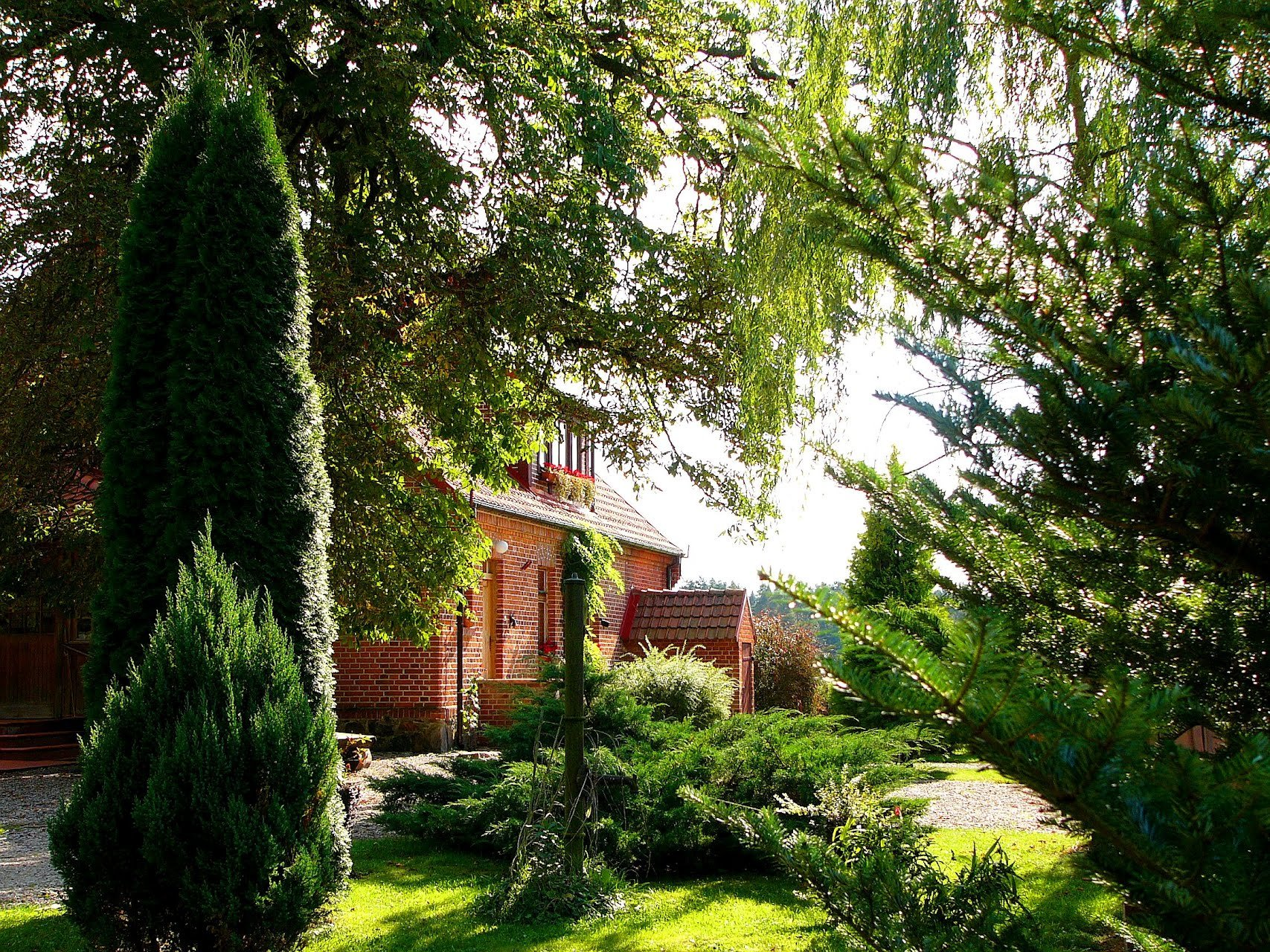
- Forester's house, Piersławek

- Location within Poland
- Coordinates: 53°46′N 21°24′E
- Country: Poland
- Voivodeship: Warmian-Masurian
- County: Mrągowo
- Gmina: Piecki

Piersławek is a village in the administrative district of Gmina Piecki, within Mrągowo County, Warmian-Masurian Voivodeship, in northeastern Poland.

== Geography ==
Piersławek lies amid the Masurian Lakes in a region known as the Baltic Uplands. Small lakes, swamps, meadows and mixed forests abound in the area. Lake Wągiel (German: Wongel) lies north of Piersławek, and the source of the Dajna River is found nearby.

== Transportation ==
Several highways traverse Piersławek, including National Highway 59 and Provincial Highway 610. The town lies 13 km (8 mi). from Mrągowo, 17 km (11 mi). from Mikołajki and 60 km (37 mi) from Olsztyn. The closest international airport is Olsztyn-Mazury Airport.

== History ==
Prior to the late Middle Ages, the region was inhabited by the Old Prussians, an extinct Baltic people related linguistically to the Lithuanians. The area was conquered by the Teutonic Order in the mid-13th Century, and after the secularization of the Order in 1525 became part of Ducal Prussia.

Kleinort was founded in 1700 as a noble estate, and after 1701 was part of the Kingdom of Prussia. Between 1818 and the transfer of the region to Poland after World War II, it was in the Kreis (district) of Sensburg (now Mrągowo). The village was occupied by the Red Army in late January 1945 during the Soviet conquest of East Prussia, and remaining German inhabitants who had not been killed or fled were eventually expelled and replaced by Polish settlers. The town became the Polish Piersławek after the war.

== Points of interest ==
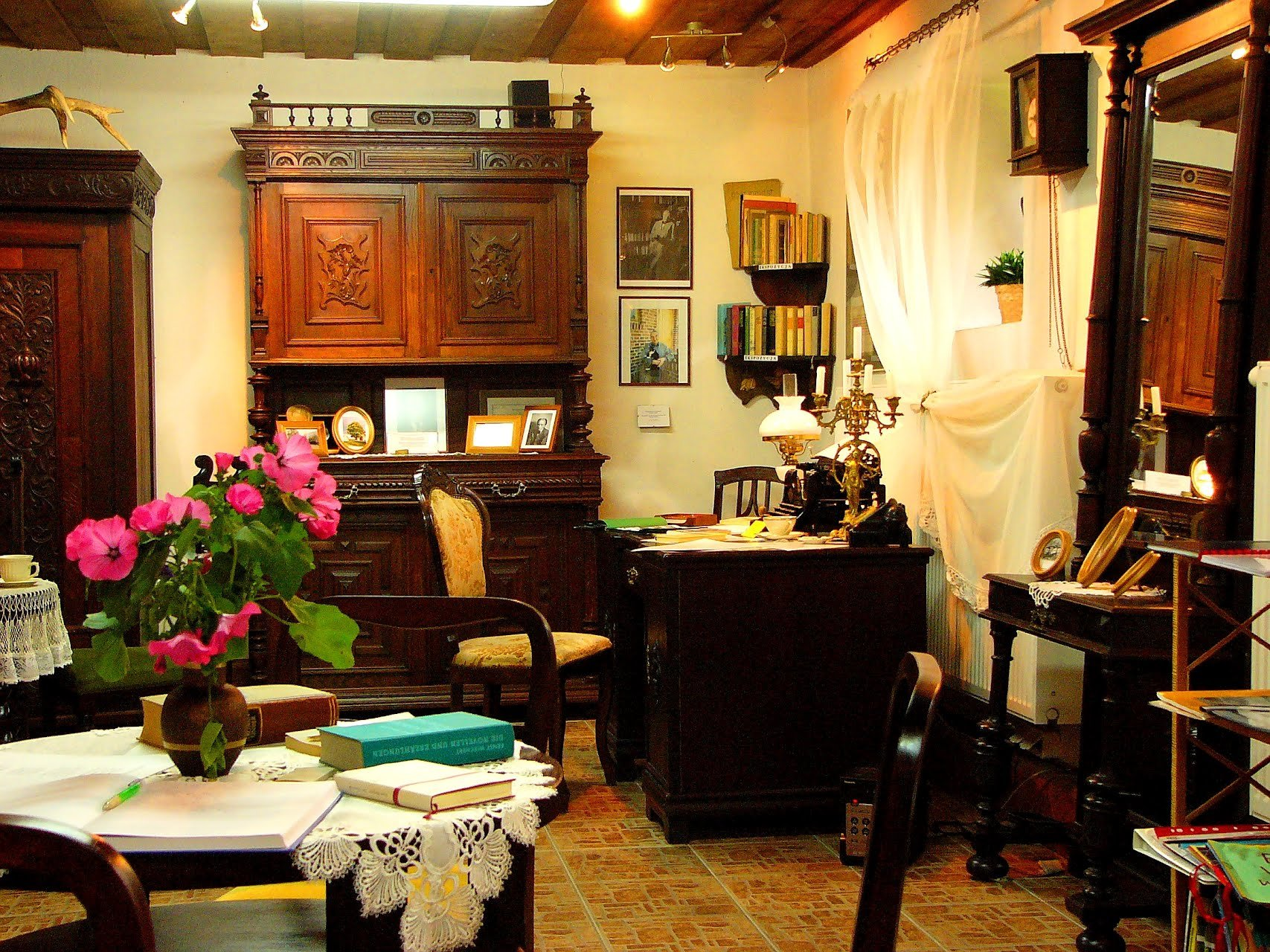
Ernst Wiechert room, Piersławek cottage

A forester's cottage (photo at top right) in the village was the childhood home of German writer and dedicated anti-Nazi Ernst Wiechert, born there on May 18, 1887, to forester Emil Wiechert and his wife Henriette (née Andreae). Wiechert grew up there and later fictionalized some of his early experiences – including the house's setting, described in the novella Tobias (1938).

A room in the house, which survived the war, has been dedicated to the memory of Wiechert, some of whose numerous works have been translated into Polish and English.

== Notable residents ==
- Ernst Wiechert (1887-1950), German author
