= Brigitte Schwaiger =

Austrian writer

Brigitte Schwaiger (6 April 1949 – 26 July 2010) was an Austrian author born in Freistadt, Austria.

She was the daughter of a doctor, while her great grandmother was Carola Seligmann, an opera singer who died in the Theresienstadt concentration camp.

Schwaiger attended grammar school at Freistadt until 1967 and then studied two semesters of Psychology, Germanic and Romance linguistics in Vienna. In 1968, she married a Spanish Officer, and moved with him to Madrid and then Mallorca before divorcing him four years later. She then attended the Pedagogic Academy in Linz, where she played part-time in cellar theatres and worked as a production assistant at ORF (Österreichischer Rundfunk - Austrian Broadcasting).

Her first novel, Wie kommt das Salz ins Meer (Why Is There Salt in the Sea?, 1977), became a sensational bestseller which sold several hundred thousand copies throughout German-speaking Europe. The heavily autobiographical first-person story tells of the monotony of everyday married life and of unsuccessful attempts to flee this world. In 1988 the novel was dramatised in a German film by Peter Beauvais, starring Nicolin Kunz and Siemen Rühaak.

Although her later works did not achieve the success of her first novel, Fallen lassen, a report of her experience in psychiatry, was met with critical acclaim.

Brigitte Schwaiger was found dead in a branch of the River Danube in Vienna at the end of July 2010. It probably was suicide. She often had spoken about "the shorter way" she would like to choose.

== Awards ==
- 1984 Culture Prize of the Province of Upper Austria

== Works ==
- Wie kommt das Salz ins Meer (Why Is There Salt in the Sea?, 1977)
- Mein spanisches Dorf (1978)
- Lange Abwesenheit (1980)
- Die Galizianerin (1982)
- Der Himmel ist süß – Eine Beichte (1984)
- Führer, Befiehl! (1986) (monologue play)
- Mit einem möcht' ich leben (1987) (poems)
- Liebesversuche (1989)
- Schönes Licht (1990)
- Tränen beleben den Staub (1991)
- Der rote Faden (1992)
- Jaro heißt Frühling (1994)
- Ein langer Urlaub (1997)
- Fallen lassen (2006) (describes her experience with psychiatry)
