= The Confusions of Young Törless =

1906 novel by Robert Musil

The Confusions of Young Törleß
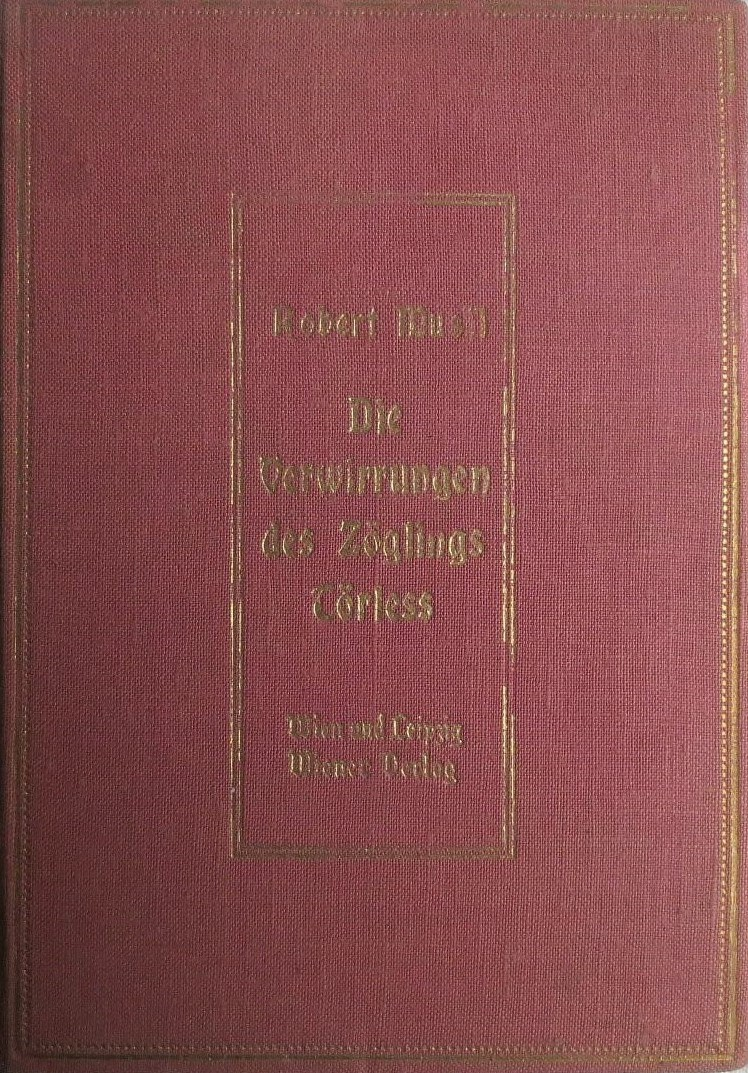
- First edition cover
- Author: Robert Musil
- Original title: Die Verwirrungen des Zöglings Törleß
- Language: German
- Genre: Bildungsroman
- Publisher: Wiener Verlag
- Publication date: 1906
- Publication place: Austria
- Media type: Print (hardback & paperback)

The Confusions of Young Törless (German: Die Verwirrungen des Zöglings Törleß), or Young Törless, is the literary debut of the Austrian philosophical novelist and essayist Robert Musil, first published in 1906. Musil's novel is ostensibly a bildungsroman, a story of a young disoriented man searching for morals in society and their meaning for him.

== Background ==
The expressionistic novel, based on Musil's personal experiences at a boarding school in Mährisch Weißkirchen, today Hranice (in Austria-Hungary, now in the Czech Republic), was written according to Musil "because of boredom". In later life, however, Musil denied that the novel was about youthful experiences of his own. Due to its explicit sexual content, the novel at first caused a scandal among the reading public and the authorities of Austria-Hungary.

== Synopsis ==
Three students of an Austrian boarding school, Reiting, Beineberg and Törless, catch their classmate Basini stealing money from one of the three and decide to punish him themselves instead of turning him in to the school authorities. They start with bullying and abusing him, first physically and then psychologically and sexually, while also blackmailing him by threatening to denounce him. Their abusive treatment of Basini becomes openly sexual and increasingly sadistic; nevertheless, he endures all the torture even when, after being deprived of any dignity, he is discredited by the entire class.

Törless' moral and sexual confusion leads him to join Beineberg and Reiting's degradation of Basini; he is both sexually attracted to Basini and Beineberg and repelled by them. He observes and takes part in the torture and rape of Basini while telling himself that he is trying to understand the gap between his rational self and his obscure irrational self; he is a disturbed and despairing observer of his own states of consciousness. Basini professes love for Törless and Törless comes to reciprocate somewhat, but is ultimately repelled by Basini's unwillingness to stand up for himself. This disgust with Basini's passivity ultimately leads him almost off-handedly to stand up to Beineberg and Reiting. When the torment becomes unbearable, Törless covertly advises Basini to turn himself in to the headmaster as a way out of the situation.

An investigation is commenced, but the only party to be found guilty is Basini. Törless makes a strange existential speech to the school authorities about the gap between the rational and irrational ("...after all, things just happen"), which puzzles the authorities more than anything else. They decide he is in need of careful monitoring, something the institute cannot provide, and suggest to his parents that he be privately educated, a conclusion that he comes to on his own.

Other subplots include Törless' experience with the local prostitute Božena, his encounter with his mathematics teacher, and his analysis of his parents' attitudes toward the world.

== Editions and translations ==
- Die Verwirrungen des Zöglings Törleß. Wien/Leipzig: Wiener Verlag, 1906.
- Die Verwirrungen des Zöglings Törleß. München/Leipzig: Georg Müller, 1911.
- Die Verwirrungen des Zöglings Törleß. 11th.-15th. thousand. Berlin: Ernst Rowohlt, 1931 [Revised edition; published Dec. 1930].
- Die Verwirrungen des Zöglings Törleß. Reinbek bei Hamburg: Rowohlt Taschenbuch Verlag, 1998. (rororo 10300.)
- Die Verwirrungen des Zöglings Törleß. Based on the revised edition 1930; with detailed commentary. Ed. by Werner Bellmann. Epilog: Filippo Smerilli. Stuttgart: Reclam, 2013.
- Young Törless. Translated by Eithne Wilkins and Ernst Kaiser. Pantheon Books, 1955.
- The Confusions of Young Törless. Translated by Shaun Whiteside, with an introduction by J. M. Coetzee. Penguin Classics, 2001.
- The Confusions of Young Master Törless. Translated by Christopher Moncrieff. Alma Classics, 2013.
- The Confusions of Young Törless. Translated by Mike Mitchell, with an introduction and notes by Ritchie Robertson. Oxford University Press, 2014.

== Reception ==
Later, various prefigurings of fascism were identified in the text, including the characters of Beineberg and Reiting, who seem to be orderly pupils by day but shamelessly abuse their classmate psychologically, physically and sexually by night.

== Adaptation ==
The German director Volker Schlöndorff made the 1966 film Young Törless based on the novel.

== Bibliography ==
- Bernhard Grossmann: Robert Musil, Die Verwirrungen des Zöglings Törless. Interpretation. 3. Auflage. Oldenbourg, München 1997. ISBN 3-486-88627-4
- Klaus Johann: Grenze und Halt: Der Einzelne im „Haus der Regeln“. Zur deutschsprachigen Internatsliteratur. Universitätsverlag Winter, Heidelberg 2003, (= Beiträge zur neueren Literaturgeschichte. 201.). ISBN 3-8253-1599-1 content (pdf-Datei), Rezension pp. 206–422. (The most extensive interpretation of „Törleß“.)
- Roland Kroemer: Ein endloser Knoten? Robert Musils „Verwirrungen des Zöglings Törleß“ im Spiegel soziologischer, psychoanalytischer und philosophischer Diskurse. Fink, München 2004. ISBN 3-7705-3946-X (Dissertation)
- Niekerk, Carl (1997). "Foucault, Freud, Musil: Macht und Masochismus in den 'Verwirrungen des Zöglings Törless'". Zeitschrift für deutsche Philologie. 116 (4): 545.
- Oliver Pfohlmann: Robert Musil. Rowohlt Verlag, Reinbek bei Hamburg 2012 (= rowohlts monographien), pp. 19–22 (ch. "Als Zögling in Eisenstadt und Mährisch-Weißkirchen") and pp. 43–49 (ch. "Die Verwirrungen des Zöglings Törleß"), ISBN 978-3-499-50721-2
- Andrea Rota: I grovigli del racconto: metafore tessili e disarticolazione narrativa ne «Die Verwirrungen des Zöglings Törless» di Robert Musil. In: Studia Austriaca. 15/2007, pp. 175–192. ISBN 978-88-6001-130-5
- Renate Schröder-Werle: Robert Musil. "Die Verwirrungen des Zöglings Törleß". Erläuterungen und Dokumente. Reclam, Stuttgart 2001.
- Filippo Smerilli: Moderne – Sprache – Körper. Analysen zum Verhältnis von Körpererfahrung und Sprachkritik in erzählenden Texten Robert Musils. V & R Unipress, Göttingen 2009.
- Dominik Zechner: "Transcendental Masochism". The Violence of Reading: Literature and Philosophy at the Threshold of Pain. Palgrave Macmillan 2024, ISBN 978-3-031-53191-0, 99–127.
