= Burton Pike =

American translator of Robert Musil (1930–2022)

Burton Pike (June 12, 1930 – December 22, 2022) was an American translator of Robert Musil, as well as a distinguished professor emeritus of comparative literature and Germanic languages and literature at the CUNY Graduate Center.

== Life and career ==
Burton Pike was born on June 12, 1930. He did his undergraduate studies at Haverford College and received his PhD from Harvard University. He taught at the University of Hamburg, Cornell University, and Queens College and Hunter College of the City University of New York. He was also a visiting professor at Yale University.

Burton Pike was a recipient of a Guggenheim Fellowship, a fellowship from the American Council of Learned Societies, and a Fulbright fellowship. He was awarded the Medal of Merit by the City of Klagenfurt, Austria, for his work on Robert Musil. He was a finalist and received a special citation for the PEN/Book-of-the-Month Club Translation Prize for editing and co-translating Musil's The Man Without Qualities. He was the winner of the 2012 Helen and Kurt Wolff Translator's Prize for Gerhard Meier's Isle of the Dead, and in 2016 was awarded the Friedrich Ulfers Prize for his work championing German-language literature in the United States.

A festschrift titled Underlying Rhythm: On Translation, Communication, and Literary Languages. Essays in Honor of Burton Pike was published in 2023.

Pike died on December 22, 2022, at the age of 92.

== Bibliography ==
Books

- Robert Musil: An Introduction to his Work, Cornell University Press, 1961. ISBN 0-8046-1546-2. Reprinted by Kennikat Press, 1972.
- The Image of the City in Modern Literature, Princeton University Press, 1981. ISBN 0-691-06488-1

Translations

- Where the Paths Do Not Go by Rainer Maria Rilke. 2018 ISBN 978-0999261323
- Isle of the Dead by Gerhard Meier. 2011 ISBN 978-1564786852
- The Notebooks of Malte Laurids Brigge by Rainer Maria Rilke. 2008 ISBN 1-56478-497-5
- The Sorrows of Young Werther by Goethe. 2004 ISBN 0-8129-6990-1
- The Man Without Qualities Volume I by Robert Musil. 1996 with Sophie Wilkins
- The Man Without Qualities Volume II by Robert Musil. 1996 with Sophie Wilkins
- Robert Musil, Selected Writings. Continuum International Publishing Group, 1986. Editor and part translator. ISBN 0-8264-0304-2
- Precision and Soul: Essays and Addresses by Robert Musil. The University of Chicago Press, 1990. With David S. Luft.
