= Peter Beauvais =

German director

Peter Beauvais (September 9, 1916 in Weißenstadt, Germany – December 17, 1986 in Baden-Baden, Germany) was a German television film director and scriptwriter. As a director for three decades, he helped pioneer and significantly influenced the development of German television.

== Career ==
Beauvais was the son of a factory owner of Jewish origin. He attended the Municipal Liebig High School in Frankfurt am Main, where he studied drama, until 1935. In 1936, under the Nazi regime, he was forced to emigrate to the United States on account of his Jewish background. There he worked as an actor on Broadway. Beauvais returned to Germany in 1945 or 1946 with the United States Army, for whom worked as an interpreter, including for the Nuremberg Trials, and as a theatre officer.

In 1950 Beauvais became an actor at the theatre in Hanover, then worked as an actor and trainee director at Werner Finck's Kabarett Die Mausefalle (Mousetrap Cabaret) in Stuttgart, and acted in American films produced in Germany. His first television direction work was in 1954, for Südwestfunk (Southwest Radio). In 1958–1960 he directed two theatrical films for UFA. He then moved back to television for good, directing more than 100 television films and episodes from 1960 to 1986. From 1962 to 1967, collaborating with the writer Horst Lommer, Beauvais directed a popular series of films for NDR.

Over the course of his career, Beauvais created a prolific and wide-ranging body of work including comedies, satires, crime films, dramas, and science fiction films. Beauvais adapted for television literary works by writers including Arthur Schnitzler, Anton Chekhov, and Joseph Roth, and directed Eugene O'Neill's Trauer muss Elektra tragen (Mourning Becomes Electra), starring Peter Pasetti. He also adapted and filmed works by contemporary writers including Siegfried Lenz, Karin Struck, Adolf Muschg, and Martin Walser, and original teleplays by writers including Peter Stripp, Daniel Christoff, and Horst Lommer.

Beauvais was also an opera director, in Germany and on international stages.

== Awards ==
Beauvais won two Adolf Grimme Prizes with gold (a prestigious award sometimes called "Germany's Golden Globes"), In 1973 for Im Reservat (In The Reserve) and in 1974 for Sechs Wochen im Leben der Brüder G. (Six Weeks in the Life of the Brothers G.). He also won a posthumous Grimme Prize (with gold) in 1988 for Sommer in Lesmona (Summer in Lesmona) (shared with Reinhard Baumgart, Katja Riemann, and Herbert Grönemeyer), and a Bambi Award, in 1968, for Zug der Zeit (The Locomotive of Time).

== Personal life ==
Beauvais was married four times, to the actress Ilsemarie Schnering, the singer and actress Karin Hübner (with whom he had a daughter, Dana), the actress Sabine Sinjen (1963 to 1984), and the photographer and later producer Barbara Beauvais. Barbara Beauvais survived him and actually completed his last film Why Is There Salt in the Sea?, as Peter Beauvais died during production.

== Filmography ==
=== Film ===
- 1958: Ist Mama nicht fabelhaft?
- 1959: Liebe, Luft und lauter Lügen

=== Television ===
- 1955: Der selige Christopher Bohn — (based on The Late Christopher Bean)
- 1955: Das Ostergeschenk (short) — (based on The Christmas Tie by William Saroyan)
- 1955: Zwischen den Zügen — (based on Still Life)
- 1955: Die falschen Nasen — (based on Les Faux Nez by Jean-Paul Sartre)
- 1955: Drei Jungen – Ein Mädchen — (based on a play by Roger Ferdinand)
- 1956: Kolibri – Eine Magazingeschichte — (based on a play by Norman Hudis)
- 1956: Die Fahrt ins Blaue — (based on La belle aventure by Gaston Arman de Caillavet, Robert de Flers and Étienne Rey)
- 1956: Regen und Wind — (based on The Wind and the Rain by Merton Hodge)
- 1956: Schatten in der 3. Avenue (screenplay by Otto Zoff)
- 1957: Schinderhannes — (based on Schinderhannes)
- 1957: Bei Tag und bei Nacht oder Der Hund des Gärtners — (based on The Dog in the Manger)
- 1957: Mrs. Cheneys Ende — (based on The Last of Mrs. Cheyney)
- 1957: Die Fee — (based on The Good Fairy)
- 1957: Das heiße Herz — (based on The Hasty Heart by John Patrick)
- 1959: Der Mann im Manne — (based on The Male Animal by James Thurber and Elliott Nugent
- 1960: Ein Fingerhut voll Mut — (based on All You Young Lovers by Jack Pulman)
- 1960: Venus Observed — (based on Venus Observed)
- 1960: Familie — (based on The Wooden Dish by Edmund Morris)
- 1961: General Quixotte — (based on L'Hurluberlu ou le Réactionnaire amoureux by Jean Anouilh)
- 1961: Madame de… — (based on a novel by Louise Lévêque de Vilmorin)
- 1961: Die kleinen Füchse — (based on The Little Foxes)
- 1961: Zwischen den Zügen — (based on Still Life)
- 1961: Ein Außenseiter — (based on Thunder on the Snowy by Peter Yeldham)
- 1961: Erinnerst du dich? — (based on The Vinegar Tree)
- 1962: Der Walzer der Toreros — (based on The Waltz of the Toreadors)
- 1962: Letzter Punkt der Tagesordnung — (based on Any Other Business by George Ross and Campbell Singer
- 1962: Onkel Harry — (remake of The Strange Affair of Uncle Harry, 1945)
- 1962: Schluck und Jau — (based on a play by Gerhart Hauptmann)
- 1962: Schönes Wochenende (screenplay by Horst Lommer)
- 1963: Jahre danach — (based on Reunion Day)
- 1963: Bilderkomödie — (based on Prenez garde à la peinture by René Fauchois)
- 1963: Die Teilnahme — (based on a play by Luigi Squarzina)
- 1963: Port Royal — (based on Port-Royal by Henry de Montherlant)
- 1963: Der arme Bitos… oder Das Diner der Köpfe — (based on Pauvre Bitos ou le Dîner de têtes by Jean Anouilh)
- 1963: Das Glück läuft hinterher (screenplay by Horst Lommer)
- 1964: Drei Schwestern — (based on Three Sisters)
- 1964: Der Feigling und die Tänzerin
- 1964: Spätsommer — (based on Late Summer Affair by Leo Lehman)
- 1964: Professor Bernhardi — (based on Professor Bernhardi)
- 1964: Ich fahre Patschold (screenplay by Horst Lommer)
- 1965: Undine — (based on Ondine)
- 1965: Michael Kramer — (based on a play by Gerhart Hauptmann)
- 1965: Nächstes Jahr in Jerusalem — (based on I'm Talking about Jerusalem)
- 1965: Tag für Tag — (based on Roots)
- 1965: Onkel Wanja – Szenen aus dem Landleben — (based on Uncle Vanya)
- 1965: Bernhard Lichtenberg — (Docudrama about Bernhard Lichtenberg)
- 1965: Die Sommerfrische — (based on a play by Carlo Goldoni)
- 1965: Mach's Beste draus (screenplay by Horst Lommer)
- 1966: Ghosts — (based on Ghosts)
- 1966: Geibelstraße 27 (screenplay by Horst Lommer)
- 1966: Jegor Bulytschow und andere — (based on Yegor Bulychov and Others by Maxim Gorky)
- 1967: Ein Duft von Blumen — (based on A Scent of Flowers by James Saunders)
- 1967: Zug der Zeit (screenplay by Horst Lommer)
- 1967: Der Teufel und der liebe Gott — (based on The Devil and the Good Lord)
- 1967: Peter Schlemihls wundersame Geschichte — (based on Peter Schlemihl)
- 1968: Ein Mann namens Harry Brent (TV miniseries) — (remake of Francis Durbridge's A Man Called Harry Brent, 1965)
- 1968: Zeit der halben Herzen — (based on A Cold Heart by Leo Lehman)
- 1968: The Accident (screenplay by Dieter Waldmann)
- 1969: The Rats — (based on The Rats)
- 1969: Fink und Fliederbusch — (based on a play by Arthur Schnitzler)
- 1969: Die Sommerfrische — (based on a play by Carlo Goldoni)
- 1969: Die Rückkehr (screenplay by Jochen Ziem)
- 1969: Rumpelstilz — (based on a play by Adolf Muschg)
- 1969: The Tale of the 1002nd Night — (based on a novel by Joseph Roth)
- 1969: Das weite Land — (based on a play by Arthur Schnitzler)
- 1970: Eine große Familie (screenplay by Dieter Waldmann)
- 1970: Trauer muß Elektra tragen — (based on Mourning Becomes Electra)
- 1971: Tatort (TV series): Kressin und der tote Mann im Fleet — (screenplay by Wolfgang Menge)
- 1971: The German Lesson — (based on The German Lesson)
- 1971: Dying — (based on a novella by Arthur Schnitzler)
- 1971: Dreht euch nicht um – der Golem geht rum (screenplay by Dieter Waldmann)
- 1972: 8051 Grinning (screenplay by Bernd Schroeder)
- 1972: Finito l'amor (screenplay by Daniel Christoff)
- 1973: Eines langen Tages Reise in die Nacht — (based on Long Day's Journey into Night)
- 1973: Im Reservat (screenplay by Peter Stripp)
- 1973: Die Gräfin von Rathenow — (based on The Marquise of O)
- 1974: Sechs Wochen im Leben der Brüder G. (screenplay by Daniel Christoff)
- 1974: Griseldis — (based on a novel by Hedwig Courths-Mahler)
- 1974: Rosenmontag (screenplay by Karl Otto Mühl)
- 1975: Evas Rippe (screenplay by Leo Lehman)
- 1975: Stumme Zeugen (screenplay by Daniel Christoff)
- 1975: Nach der Scheidung (screenplay by Peter Stripp)
- 1975: Hilde Breitner (screenplay by Peter Stripp)
- 1975: Am Wege — (based on Ved Vejen)
- 1976: Männergeschichten – Frauengeschichten (screenplay by Jochen Ziem)
- 1976: Dorothea Merz — (based on a play by Tankred Dorst)
- 1977: Glücksucher (screenplay by Dieter Wellershoff)
- 1977: On Mount Chimborazo — (based on a play by Tankred Dorst)
- 1977: Die Soldaten — (based on The Soldiers)
- 1977: Rückfälle (screenplay by Daniel Christoff)
- 1979: Phantasten (screenplay by Dieter Wellershoff)
- 1979: Trennung – Die Geschichte der Anna Wildermuth — (based on Trennung by Karin Struck)
- 1979: Kur in Travemünde (screenplay by Karl Otto Mühl)
- 1980: Berlin Mitte (screenplay by Peter Stripp)
- 1981: Das Käthchen von Heilbronn oder Die Feuerprobe — (based on Das Käthchen von Heilbronn)
- 1982: Männer (screenplay by Peter Stripp)
- 1983: Der Kunstfehler (screenplay by Daniel Christoff)
- 1983: Heimat, die ich meine (screenplay by Daniel Christoff)
- 1984: Die ewigen Gefühle — (based on a novel by Bernard von Brentano)
- 1985: Verworrene Bilanzen (screenplay by Peter Stripp)
- 1986: Runaway Horse — (based on a novella by Martin Walser)
- 1987: Sommer in Lesmona (TV miniseries) — (based on an epistolary novel by Magdalene Pauli)
- 1988: Why Is There Salt in the Sea? — (based on a novel by Brigitte Schwaiger)
