= Adolf Frisé =

German journalist and writer

- Born: 29 May 1910; Euskirchen, North Rhine-Westphalia, Germany
- Died: 2 May 2003 (aged 92); Frankfurt am Main
- Occupations: Journalist, author and editor
- Spouse: Maria von Loesch (m. 1957)

Adolf Frisé (29 May 1910 in Euskirchen, North Rhine-Westphalia − 2 May 2003 in Frankfurt am Main) was a German journalist, author and editor. He was the editor of the literary works of the Austrian philosophical writer Robert Musil.

== Life ==
Frisé grew up in Viersen in the Lower Rhine region where he attended the Erasmus von Rotterdam Gymnasium. The German writer and historian of culture Gustav René Hocke was a friend and fellow student there. After completing his secondary education, he went on to study at the Ludwig-Maximilians-Universität München, the Friedrich Wilhelm University of Berlin, and Heidelberg University. At Heidelberg University, he studied under Friedrich Gundolf and took his doctorate in German Studies in 1932. He then worked as a freelance writer in Berlin until 1940 when he was called up for national service between 1940 and 1945.

Adolf Frisé was married to the writer and journalist Maria Frisé (born von Loesch).

== Robert Musil ==
After the war Adolf Frisé arranged to meet the widow of Robert Musil, Martha Musil, in order to secure the literary estate of the author who had died in 1942. Musil had published the first two volumes of his acclaimed novel Der Mann ohne Eigenschaften (The Man Without Qualities) in 1930 (vol. 1) and 1933 (vol. 2) and Martha Musil had decided to publish the unfinished chapters and some other materials from his estate in 1943 whilst in exile in Switzerland.

Frisé began publishing the collected works of Robert Musil in three volumes from 1952 to 1957, leading to the rediscovery of Musil in the German-speaking world. The project was to last several decades and led to the definitive edition of his works published between 1978 and 1981. This included annotated editions of Musil's diaries and letters. In 1992 the first CD-ROM format edition of materials from the unpublished estate of Robert Musil appeared, with Adolf Frisé as co-editor.

In 1974 Frisé became a professor at the University of Vienna and in 1979 was named honorary President of the International Robert Musil Society, today based in Klagenfurt. In 1982 he was given an honorary doctorate by the University of Klagenfurt.

Frisé's main occupation was that of journalist, first in Hamburg and then as editor at the Hessischer Rundfunk (Hessian Broadcasting Corporation) based in Frankfurt am Main, where from 1956 to 1962 he produced the Abendstudio programme.

In addition Frisé wrote travel reports, pieces for theatre and novels.

== Definitive edition of Musil edited by Frisé ==
Robert Musil – Gesammelte Werke. (Collected Works) Ed. Adolf Frisé. Reinbek: Rowohlt:

- Vol. I: Prosa und Stücke, Kleine Prosa, Aphorismen, Autobiographisches. 1978, ISBN 3-498-09287-1
- Vol. II: Essays und Reden. Kritik. 1978, ISBN 3-498-09287-1
- Vol. III: Der Mann ohne Eigenschaften. Erstes und Zweites Buch. Roman. 1978, ISBN 3-498-09285-5
- Vol. IV: Der Mann ohne Eigenschaften. Aus dem Nachlass. 1978, ISBN 3-498-09285-5
- Vol. V: Tagebücher. 1976, ISBN 3-498-09289-8
- Vol. VI: Tagebücher. Anmerkungen, Anhang, Register. 1976, ISBN 3-498-09289-8
- Vol. VII: Briefe 1901–1942. 1981, ISBN 3-498-04269-6
- Vol. VIII: Briefe 1901–1942, Kommentar, Register. 1981, ISBN 3-498-04269-6

Der literarische Nachlaß. CD-ROM-Edition. Ed. Friedbert Aspetsberger, Karl Eibl and Adolf Frisé. Reinbek: Rowohlt, 1992

In addition, Frisé published numerous single-volume editions of the works of Robert Musil.

== Works by Adolf Frisé ==
- Die Reise ins Ausland. (Travel writing) Hamburg: Drei Türme, 1948
- Unvollendet - Unvollendbar? Überlegungen zum Torso des "Mann ohne Eigenschaften". Merkur, vol. 390, November 1980 pp. 1099–1115
- Plädoyer für Robert Musil. Hinweise und Essays 1931 bis 1980. Reinbek: Rowohlt 1980. Enlarged edition, 1987, ISBN 3-498-02055-2
- Katharinas Gast (Play) Published with the Hunzinger-Bühnenverlag 1988
- Andreas. (Play) Published with the Hunzinger-Bühnenverlag 1988
- Der Beginn der Vergangenheit. Novel. Reinbek: Rowohlt 1990, ISBN 978-3-498-02064-4
- Johanna (Novel) Reinbek: Rowohlt 1997, ISBN 978-3-498-02082-8
- Wir leben immer mehrere Leben. Erinnerungen. Reinbek: Rowohlt 2004, ISBN 978-3-498-02091-0
- Spiegelungen. Berichte, Kommentare, Texte 1933–1998. (A volume published in celebration of Frisé's

90th birthday.) Bern 2000, ISBN 978-3-906758-50-3

== Literature ==
- Adelheid Limbach: "Über Adolf Frisé," in: Heimatbuch Kreis Viersen. Viersen 2011
- Maria Frisé: "Szenen einer Ehe," in: Heimatbuch Kreis Viersen. Viersen 2011
