= Siegfried Lenz =

German writer (1926–2014)

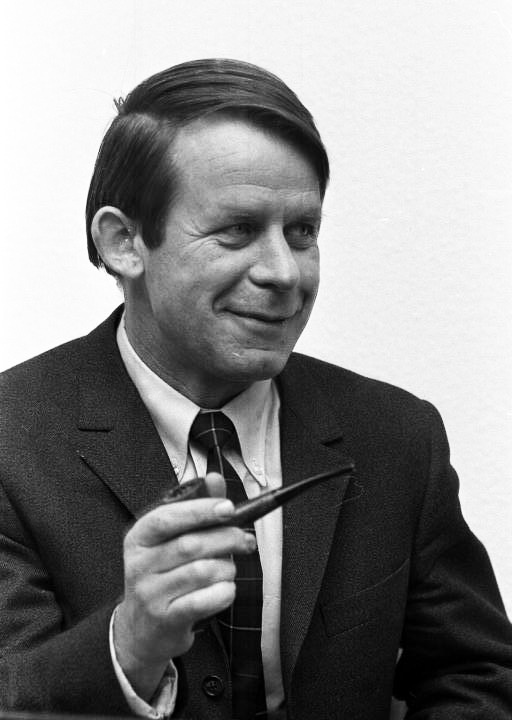
- Lenz in 1969
- Born: 17 March 1926; Lyck, Germany (now Ełk, Poland)
- Died: 7 October 2014 (aged 88); Hamburg, Germany
- Education: University of Hamburg
- Occupation: Novelist
- Writing career
- Period: 1956–2014
- Notable work: The German Lesson
- Notable awards: Peace Prize of the German Book Trade (1988); Goethe Prize (2000); Honorary citizen of Schleswig-Holstein (2004)
- Website: www.siegfried-lenz.de

Siegfried Lenz (German: [ˈziːkfʁiːt ˈlɛnts]; 17 March 1926 – 7 October 2014) was a German writer of novels, short stories and essays, as well as dramas for radio and the theatre. In 2000 he received the Goethe Prize on the 250th Anniversary of Johann Wolfgang von Goethe's birth. He won the 2010 International Nonino Prize in Italy.

== Life ==
Siegfried Lenz was born in Lyck, East Prussia (now Ełk, Poland), the son of a customs officer. After graduating in 1943 he was drafted into the Kriegsmarine.

According to documents released in June 2007, he joined the Nazi Party at the age of 18 on 20 April 1944 along with several other German authors and personalities such as Dieter Hildebrandt and Martin Walser. However Lenz subsequently said he had been included in a collective ‘joining’ of the Party without his knowledge. In World War II he was a soldier in the German Kriegsmarine and served as a Fähnrich zur See (officer cadet) on the Admiral Scheer, the German auxiliary cruiser Hansa, and for a short period in Naestved in Denmark. Shortly after the German surrender at Lüneburg Heath he deserted and was held briefly as a prisoner of war in Schleswig-Holstein. He then worked as an interpreter for the British army.

At the University of Hamburg, he studied philosophy, English and literary history. His studies were cut off early when he became an intern for the daily newspaper Die Welt, where he served as an editor from 1950 to 1951. It was there he met his future wife, Liselotte, whom he married in 1949.

In 1951, Lenz used the money he had earned from his first novel, Habichte in der Luft ("Hawks in the air"), to finance a trip to Kenya. During his time there he wrote about the Mau Mau Uprising in his short story "Lukas, sanftmütiger Knecht" ("Luke, gentle servant"). After 1951, Lenz worked as a freelance writer in Hamburg, where he joined the Group 47 group of writers. Together with Günter Grass he became engaged with the Social Democratic Party and championed the Ostpolitik of Willy Brandt. As a supporter of rapprochement with Eastern Europe, he was a member of the German delegation at the signing of the Treaty of Warsaw (1970). In October 2011, he was made an honorary citizen of his home town Ełk, which had become Polish as a result of the border changes promulgated at the 1945 Potsdam Conference.

In 2003, Lenz joined the Verein für deutsche Rechtschreibung und Sprachpflege (Society for German Spelling and Language Cultivation) to protest against the German orthography reform of 1996.

His wife, Liselotte, died in 2006 after 57 years of marriage. Four years later he married his 74-year-old neighbour, Ulla, who had helped him after the death of his wife. Siegfried Lenz died at the age of 88 on 7 October 2014 in Hamburg.

After his death, a previously unpublished novel, Der Überläufer ("The Turncoat"), which Lenz had written in 1951, was published. Found among his effects, it is a novel about a German soldier who defects to Soviet forces.

== Honours ==
In 1988 Lenz was awarded the Peace Prize of the German Book Trade, a prize given annually at the Frankfurt Book Fair. The Goethe Prize of Frankfurt am Main (Goethepreis der Stadt Frankfurt) was given to Lenz in 2000. A year later Lenz was honoured with the highest decoration of Hamburg, honorary citizenship. In 2004 Lenz was named an honorary citizen of Schleswig Holstein and in October 2011 an honorary citizen of his hometown Ełk (Lyck). In 2010 he won the Italian International Nonino Prize.

== Siegfried Lenz Prize ==
The Siegfried Lenz Prize is a literary prize awarded every two years in Hamburg by the Siegfried Lenz Foundation. The prize is awarded to "international writers who have gained recognition with their narrative work and whose creative work is close to the spirit of Siegfried Lenz." A five-member jury appointed by the Foundation selects winners. The prize includes an award of 50,000 euros, ranking among the highest-endowed literature awards in Germany. The prize was initiated by Siegfried Lenz in 2014 before his death in October of that year.

== Selected bibliography ==
=== Novels ===
- Es waren Habichte in der Luft (1951) OCLC 4181946
- Duell mit dem Schatten (1953) ISBN 978-3-455-04255-9
- Der Mann im Strom (1957) OCLC 5955470
- Brot und Spiele (1959) OCLC 4181935
- Das Feuerschiff (1960) OCLC 1028271 (English: The Lightship, trans. M. Bullock, 1960)
- Stadtgespräch (1963) OCLC 360361
- Deutschstunde (1968) OCLC 887072907 (English: The German Lesson, trans. E. Kaiser and E. Wilkins, 1968)
- Das Vorbild (1973) ISBN 978-3-4550-4238-2 (English: An Exemplary Life, trans. Douglas Parmée, 1976)
- Heimatmuseum (1978) ISBN 978-3-455-04222-1 (English: The Heritage, trans. Krishna Winston, 1983)
- Der Verlust (1981) ISBN 978-3-455-04244-3
- Exerzierplatz (1985) ISBN 978-3-455-04213-9 (English: Training Ground, trans. G. Skelton, 1991)
- Die Klangprobe (1990) ISBN 978-3-455-04248-1
- Die Auflehnung (1994) ISBN 978-3-455-04252-8
- Arnes Nachlass (1999) ISBN 978-3-455-04289-4
- Fundbüro (2003) ISBN 978-3-455-04280-1
- Landesbühne (2009) ISBN 978-3-423-13985-4
- Der Überläufer (2016) ISBN 978-3-455-81402-6 (English: The Turncoat, trans. John Cullen)

=== Novellas and short story collections ===
- So zärtlich war Suleyken: masurische Geschichten (1955) – short stories OCLC 3570259
- Der Geist der Mirabelle: Geschichten aus Bollerup (1975) – short stories
- Die Erzählungen (2006) – short stories ISBN 3-455-04285-6 (First published by Deutscher Taschenbuch Verlag: Vol. 1: 1949–1958. Vol 2: 1959–1964. Vol. 3: 1965–1984) (English: The Selected Stories of Siegfried Lenz, selections from Die Erzählungen, 1995)
- Schweigeminute (2008) – novella ISBN 978-3-455-04284-9

=== Plays ===
- Das schönste Fest der Welt (1956) OCLC 215017008
- Zeit der Schuldlosen. Zeit der Schuldigen. (1961) OCLC 8651536
- Das Gesicht (1964) OCLC 1250172
- Haussuchung (1967) OCLC 59690579
- Die Augenbinde (1970) OCLC 256912361
- Drei Stücke (1980) ISBN 978-3-455-04242-9

=== Other ===
- Das Kabinett der Konterbande (1956) OCLC 8465256
- Jäger des Spotts. Geschichten aus dieser Zeit (1958) – Narratives OCLC 777022446
- Lukas, sanftmütiger Knecht (1958) OCLC 221865117
- Stimmungen der See (1962) OCLC 950463
- Lehmanns Erzählungen, oder So schön war mein Markt: aus den Bekenntnissen eines Schwarzhändlers (1964) OCLC 60240089
- Der Spielverderber (1965) OCLC 263613364
- Leute von Hamburg (1968) OCLC 257975222
- Einstein überquert die Elbe bei Hamburg (1975) ISBN 978-3-455-04227-6
- Ein Kriegsende (1984) ISBN 978-3-455-04212-2
- Das serbische Mädchen (1987) ISBN 978-3-455-04245-0
- Ludmilla (1996) ISBN 978-3-455-04256-6
- Zaungast (2004) ISBN 978-3-455-04278-8

=== Essays, children's books, speeches ===
- 1970 Beziehungen, Essay
- 1971 Die Herrschaftssprache der CDU, Speech
- 1971 Verlorenes Land – Gewonnene Nachbarschaft, Speech
- 1971 So war das mit dem Zirkus, Children's book
- 1980 Gespräche mit Manès Sperber und Leszek Kołakowski
- 1982 Über Phantasie: Gespräche mit Heinrich Böll, Günter Grass, Walter Kempowski, Pavel Kohout
- 1983 Elfenbeinturm und Barrikade. Erfahrungen am Schreibtisch, Essay
- 1986 Geschichte erzählen – Geschichten erzählen, Essay
- 1992 Über das Gedächtnis. Reden und Aufsätze, Speeches and essays collection
- 1998 Über den Schmerz, Essay
- 2001 Mutmassungen über die Zukunft der Literatur, Essay
- 2006 Selbstversetzung, Über Schreiben und Leben, ISBN 3-455-04286-4
- 2014 Gelegenheit zum Staunen. Ausgewählte Essays, ed. by Heinrich Detering. Hoffmann und Campe Verlag, ISBN 978-3-455-40493-7

== Filmography ==
- Man in the River, directed by Eugen York (1958, based on the novel Der Mann im Strom)
- The Lightship, directed by Ladislao Vajda (1963, based on the story Das Feuerschiff)
- Zeit der Schuldlosen, directed by Fritz Schröder-Jahn (TV film, 1961, based on the play Die Zeit der Schuldlosen)
- Time of the Innocent, directed by Thomas Fantl (1964, based on the play Die Zeit der Schuldlosen)
- Risiko für Weihnachtsmänner, directed by Thomas Fantl (TV film, 1968, based on the short story Risiko für Weihnachtsmänner)
- Das schönste Fest der Welt, directed by Thomas Fantl (TV film, 1969, based on the play Das schönste Fest der Welt)
- The German Lesson, directed by Peter Beauvais (TV miniseries, 1971, based on the novel The German Lesson)
- Lehmanns Erzählungen, directed by Wolfgang Staudte (TV film, 1975, based on Lehmanns Erzählungen)
- Der Geist der Mirabelle, directed by Eberhard Pieper (TV film, 1978, based on Der Geist der Mirabelle)
- Ein Kriegsende, directed by Volker Vogeler (TV film, 1984, based on the story Ein Kriegsende)
- The Lightship, directed by Jerzy Skolimowski (1986, based on the story Das Feuerschiff)
- Heimatmuseum, directed by Egon Günther (TV miniseries, 1988, based on the novel Heimatmuseum)
- The Serbian Girl, directed by Peter Sehr (1991, based on the novel Das serbische Mädchen)
- Der Mann im Strom, directed by Niki Stein (TV film, 2006, based on the novel Der Mann im Strom)
- The Lightship, directed by Florian Gärtner (TV film, 2008, based on the story Das Feuerschiff)
- Die Auflehnung, directed by Manfred Stelzer (TV film, 2009, based on the novel Die Auflehnung)
- Arnes Nachlass, directed by Thorsten Schmidt (TV film, 2012, based on the novel Arnes Nachlass)
- High Tide Is Dead on Time, directed by Thomas Berger (TV film, 2014, based on the story Die Flut ist pünktlich)
- The Loss, directed by Thomas Berger (TV film, 2015, based on the novel Der Verlust)
- Die Nacht im Hotel, directed by Konstantinos Sampanis (short, 2015, based on the 1948 short story "Die Nacht im Hotel")
- A Minute's Silence, directed by Thorsten Schmidt (TV film, 2016, based on the novel Schweigeminute)
- The Start of Something, directed by Thomas Berger (TV film, 2019, based on the story Der Anfang von etwas)
- The German Lesson, directed by Christian Schwochow (2019, based on the novel The German Lesson)
- The Turncoat, directed by Florian Gallenberger (2020, based on the novel Der Überläufer)
