= Time of the Innocent =

1964 film

- Directed by: Thomas Fantl
- Written by: Thomas Fantl; Siegfried Lenz
- Produced by: Peter Carsten
- Starring: Erik Schumann
- Cinematography: Georg Krause
- Edited by: Hans Sohnle
- Distributed by: Columbia-Bavaria Filmgesellschaft (GST)
- Release date: 30 June 1964
- Running time: 95 minutes
- Country: West Germany
- Language: German

Time of the Innocent (German: Die Zeit der Schuldlosen) is a 1964 West German drama film directed by Thomas Fantl.

== Cast ==
In alphabetical order

- Karl-Otto Alberty
- Otto Brüggemann
- Hans Cossy
- Gustl Datz
- Hans Drahn
- Heinz-Leo Fischer
- Wolfgang Kieling
- Nino Korda
- Franz Mosthav
- Peter Pasetti
- Hans Reiser
- Rudolf Scarlatti
- Erik Schumann
- Walter Wilz

== Production ==
Time of the Innocent is based on a play by Siegfried Lenz. The film was directed by Thomas Fantl.

== Release ==
Time of the Innocent was distributed by Columbia-Bavaria Filmgesellschaft in Germany and represented by Export-Film Bischoff worldwide.

It was entered into the 14th Berlin International Film Festival. It opened in the presence of President Lübke and his wife, German Chancellor Erhard, Vice Chancellor Mende, Secretary of State Schröder, Minister Westrick, "Bundespressechef" von Haase in Berlin's famous Zoo Palast, which is one of the highest attendances of German politician to a Berlinale premiere.
