= The German Lesson =

Novel by Siegrid Lenz

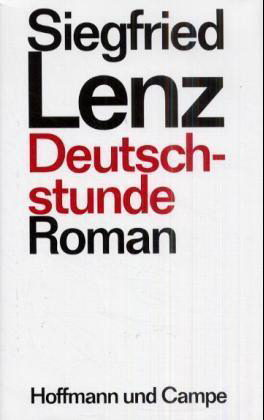
- Author: Siegfried Lenz
- Original title: Deutschstunde
- Translator: Ernst Kaiser and Eithne Wilkins
- Language: German
- Genre: Novel
- Publisher: Hoffmann und Campe; New Directions Publishing (English translation)
- Publication date: 1968
- Publication place: Germany
- Media type: Print
- Pages: 470 pp (English translation)
- ISBN: 978-0-8112-0982-3 (English translation)

The German Lesson (original title: Deutschstunde) is a novel by the German writer Siegfried Lenz, published in 1968 in Germany. The English translation by Ernst Kaiser and Eithne Wilkins, titled The German Lesson, was first published in London by Macdonald & Co. in 1971 and later by New Directions in 1986. Deutschstunde was translated into several languages and is considered to be one of the defining works of German post-war literature.

== Plot ==
Siggi Jepsen (the first-person narrator), an inmate of a juvenile detention center, is forced to write an essay with the title "The Joy of Duty." In the essay, Siggi describes his youth in Nazi Germany where his father, the "most northerly police officer in Germany," does his duty, even when he is ordered to debar his old childhood friend, the expressionist painter Max Nansen, from his profession, because the Nazis banned expressionism as "degenerate art" (entartete Kunst).

Siggi, however, is fascinated by Nansen's paintings, "the green faces, the Mongol eyes, these deformed bodies ... " and, without the knowledge of his father, manages to hide some of the confiscated paintings. Following the end of World War II, Jepsen senior is interned for a short time and later reinstalled as a policeman in rural Schleswig-Holstein. When he then obsessively continues to carry out his former orders, Siggi brings Nansen paintings that he believes to be in danger to safety. His father discovers his doings and dutifully turns him in for art theft.

When forced to write the essay on "The Joy of Duty" during his term in the juvenile detention center near Hamburg, the memories of his childhood come to the surface and he goes far beyond the "duty" of writing his essay by filling several notebooks with caustic recollections of this entire saga.

=== Characters ===
- Siggi Jepsen
- Jens Ole Jepsen, Siggi's father, a police officer
- Max Nansen, a painter, pursued by the Nazis, whom Lenz based on the expressionist painter Emil Nolde
- Gudrun Jepsen, Siggi's mother
- Klaas, Siggi's brother
- Hilke, Siggi's sister

== Historical reference ==
The character of the painter Nansen is thought to be based on Emil Nolde, who was condemned as a degenerate painter by the Nazis. The fictional and real painters' lives diverge in important points, however, as Nolde was an early member of the Nazi party and held strong Nazi beliefs.

== Adaptations ==
In 1971 Peter Beauvais filmed The German Lesson for the German TV-broadcaster ARD section SFB.

In 2019 Christian Schwochow directed The German Lesson as a cinema adaption. The film stars Tobias Moretti as Max Nansen and Ulrich Noethen as Jens Jepsen, with Johanna Wokalek, Louis Hofmann and Sonja Richter in further roles.

== Releases details ==
- German: Deutschstunde (1968). Hamburg: Hoffmann und Campe, OCLC 17466388 (First edition)
  - German: Deutschstunde (2006). Hamburg: Hoffmann und Campe, ISBN 978-3-455-04211-5 (20th ed., hardcover)
  - German: Deutschstunde (2006). Munich: Deutscher Taschenbuch Verlag, ISBN 978-3-423-13411-8 (37th ed., paperback)
- Chinese: De yu ke. (2008) Taibei Shi: Yuan liu chu ban shi ye gu fen you xian gong si, ISBN 978-957-32-6000-4
- French: La leçon d'allemand (2001). Paris: R. Laffont, ISBN 978-2-221-09460-0
- Korean: Togirŏ sigan (2000). Sŏul Tʻŭkpyŏlsi : Minŭmsa, ISBN 978-89-374-6040-1
- Danish: Tysktime (1996). København: Gyldendal, ISBN 978-87-00-25506-7
- Portuguese: A lição de alemão (1991) Lisboa: Publ. Dom Quixote, ISBN 978-972-20-0841-9
- Spanish: Lección de alemán (1990) Madrid: Debate, ISBN 978-84-7444-362-2
- Estonian: Saksa keele tund (1975). Translated by Rita Tasa. Tallinn: Eesti Raamat.
- Finnish: Saksantunti (1974). Helsinki: Uusi kirjakerho, ISBN 978-951-638-044-8
- Romanian: Ora de germană (1972). București: Editura Univers.
- Russian: Урок немецкого (1970). Москва: Прогресс, OCLC 312415290
- Slovak: Hodina nemčiny (1972). Bratislava: Slovenský Spisovatel', OCLC 72404937
- Turkish: Almanca Dersi (2012). Translated by Ayşe Sarısayın. İstanbul: Everest Yayınları, ISBN 978-605-141-016-6
- Czech: Hodina němčiny (1974). Translated by Jan Scheinost. Praha: Odeon, OCLC 42102701
- Hebrew: השיעור בגרמנית (1978)
- Vietnamese: Giờ Đức văn (2019). Translated by Hoàng Đăng Lãnh: Nhã Nam Books.
- Catalan: Lliçó d'alemany (2016). Translated by Joan Ferrarons. Barcelona: Club Editor, ISBN 978-84-7329-206-1
