= Thomas Fantl =

German film director

- Born: 9 December 1928; Prague, Czechoslovakia
- Died: 20 July 2001 (aged 72); Munich, Germany
- Occupations: Film director Screenwriter
- Years active: 1964-1986

Thomas Fantl (9 December 1928 – 20 July 2001) was a German film director and screenwriter. He directed 23 films between 1964 and 1986. His 1964 film Time of the Innocent was entered into the 14th Berlin International Film Festival.

== Filmography ==
- Time of the Innocent (1964) — based on a play by Siegfried Lenz
- Das Rendezvous (1965, TV film) — screenplay by Gabriele Wohmann
- Das Haus der sieben Balkone (1965, TV film) — based on the play La casa de los siete balcones by Alejandro Casona
- Wovon die Menschen leben (1965, TV film) — based on Leo Tolstoy's short story What Men Live By
- Die Gefährtin (1967, TV film) — based on a play by Jean-Louis Curtis
- Stunde der Nachtigallen (1967, TV film) — based on a play by James Parish
- In aller Stille (1967, TV film)
- Interpol: Geborene Lipowski (1967, TV series episode)
- Das ausgefüllte Leben des Alexander Dubronski (1967, TV film) — screenplay by Dieter Waldmann
- Nachtcafé (1968, TV film) — based on the play Appelez-moi Rose by Youri
- Wo man sich trifft (1968, TV film) — remake of the Swedish TV film Nattcafé
- Risiko für Weihnachtsmänner (1968, TV film) — based on a short story by Siegfried Lenz
- Hürdenlauf (1969, TV film) — screenplay by Dieter Waldmann
- Das schönste Fest der Welt (1969, TV film) — based on a radio play by Siegfried Lenz
- Van Gogh (1969, TV film) — based on a play by Alfred Matusche
- Eine Rechnung, die nicht aufgeht (1969, TV film) — based on a story by Wolfdietrich Schnurre
- All Backs Were Turned (1970, TV film) — based on a story by Marek Hłasko
- Lieber Erwin (1970, TV film)
- Ludwig van Beethoven: "... in allem streng die Wahrheit" (1970, TV film)
- Recht oder Unrecht: Der Schuß (1970, TV series episode)
- Aufstiegschancen (1971, TV film) — screenplay by Max von der Grün
- Die Untaten des Fräulein Mikova (1971, TV film) — screenplay by Vratislav Blažek
- Sein Schutzengel (1971, TV film) — screenplay by Wolfdietrich Schnurre
- Faire l'amour : De la pilule à l'ordinateur (1971, international anthology film)
- Freitags dienstbereit – Passage-Apotheke (1971, TV film)
- Alarm (1972, TV series)
- Gabriel (1973, TV film) — screenplay by Vratislav Blažek
- Der Nervtöter (1973, TV series, 6 episodes)
- Tatort: Eine todsichere Sache (1974, TV series episode)
- Das einsame Haus (1974, TV film) — screenplay by Ladislav Mňačko
- Keine Spürhunde für den Fiskus (1975, TV film)
- Der Knabe mit den 13 Vätern (1976, TV series, 13 episodes) — based on a novel by Alexander Roda Roda
- Der Haupttreffer (1977, TV film)
- Flucht (1977, TV film) — screenplay by Ladislav Mňačko
- Der Preis (1977, TV film) — based on the play The Price by Arthur Miller
- Geschichten aus der Zukunft: Noch einmal Adam und Eva (1978, TV series episode)
- Die Magermilchbande (1979, TV series, 14 episodes)
- Die gütigen Augen des Herrn L. (1979, TV film)
- Eingriffe (1980, TV film)
- Die Aufgabe des Dr. med. Graefe (1982, TV film)
- Unterwegs nach Atlantis (1982, TV series, 13 episodes) — based on two novels by Johanna von Koczian
- Der Paragraphenwirt (1983, TV series, 13 episodes)
- Crooks in Paradise (1985, TV film) — screenplay by Maria Matray
- Stadttheater (1985, TV film) — based on a novel by Fritz Raab
- Alte Freundschaften (1989, TV film)
- Solo für Sudmann: Konfettimord (1997, TV series episode)
