= Ernst Wiechert =

German writer (1887–1950)

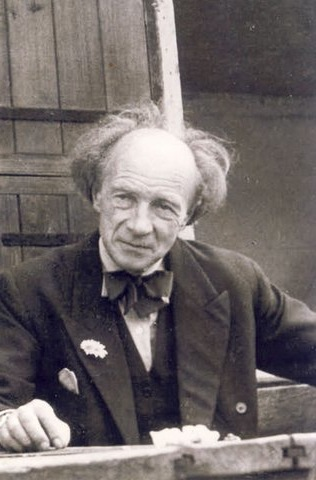
Ernst Wiechert in 1949

Ernst Wiechert (18 May 1887 – 24 August 1950) was a German teacher, poet and writer.

== Biography ==
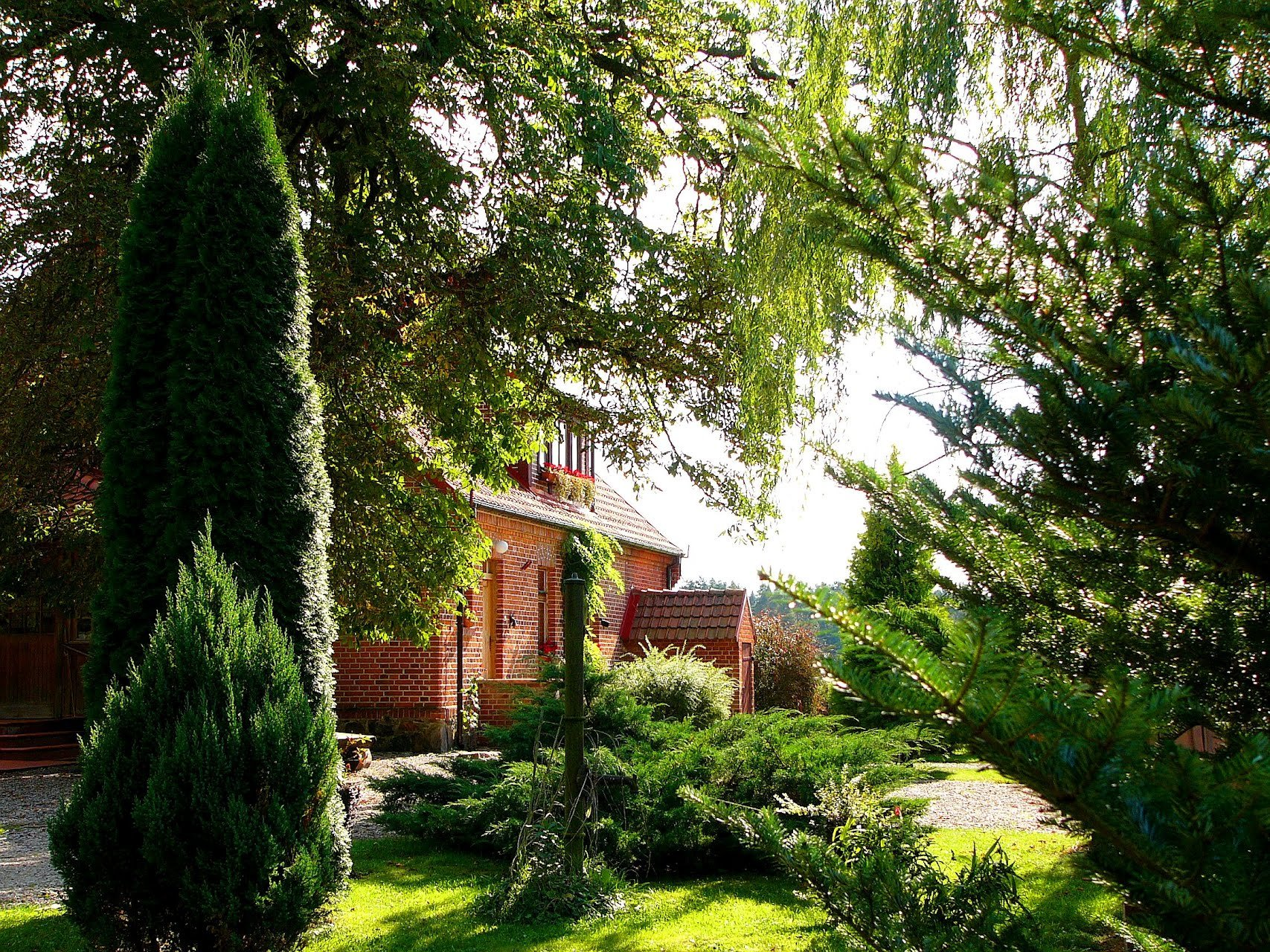
Wiechert's birthplace and childhood home

Wiechert was born in the village of Kleinort, East Prussia, (now Piersławek, Poland).

He was one of the most widely read novelists in Germany during the 1930s. He incorporated his humanist ideals in his novels among which Das einfache Leben (The simple Life, 1939) and Die Jeromin-Kinder (The Jeromin children, 1945/47) are the best known today.

Wiechert was strongly opposed to Nazism from the start. He appealed in 1933 and 1935 to the undergraduates in Munich to retain their critical thinking in relation to the national socialist ideology. This was rated as call to internal resistance. The minutes of the speech circulated illegally in Germany and reached Moscow in 1937 baked in bread. Here it was published in the influential exile magazine Das Wort (The Word). But Wiechert went even further and dared to openly criticize the imprisonment of Martin Niemöller by the Nazis in 1938. He was arrested shortly after the rigged plebiscite by which Germany absorbed Austria in April 1938.

In consequence of his criticism, he was interned in the Buchenwald concentration camp for four months. He wrote down his memories about his imprisonment and buried the manuscript; it was published in 1945 as Der Totenwald (Forest of the dead).

After the war, Wiechert was a critic of West German society. In 1948, he settled in Stäfa, Switzerland, where he died in August 1950 of cancer. He was buried in Stäfa.

== Works ==
- Die Flucht, novel, (pseudonym: Ernst Barany Bjell), 1916
- Der Wald, novel, 1922
- Der Totenwolf, novel, 1924
- Die blauen Schwingen, novel, 1925
- Der Knecht Gottes Andreas Nyland, novel, 1926
- Der silberne Wagen, short stories, 1928
- Die kleine Passion. Geschichte eines Kindes, novel, 1929
- Die Flöte des Pan, short stories, 1930
- Jedermann, novel, 1931
- Die Magd des Jürgen Doskocil, 1932
- Geschichte eines Knaben, novel, 1933
- Das Spiel vom deutschen Bettelmann, radio play, 1933
- Die Majorin, novel, 1934
- Der Todeskandidat, short stories, 1934
- Der verlorene Sohn, play, 1935
- Die goldene Stadt, play, 1935
- Hirtennovelle, short stories, 1935
- Wälder und Menschen, childhood memoirs, 1936
- Das heilige Jahr, short stories, 1936
- Von den treuen Begleitern, interpretations of poems, 1938
- Atli, der Bestmann, short stories, 1938
- Das einfache Leben, novel, 1939, ISBN 3-548-24826-8
- Die Jeromin-Kinder, novel, 1945/7, ISBN 3-7844-2384-1, ISBN 3-7844-2030-3
- Die Totenmesse, short story, 1945/7
- Der brennende Dornbusch, short story, 1945
- Demetrius, short story, 1945
- Der Totenwald, Report from the concentration camp Buchenwald, 1946 (written in 1937) ISBN 3-548-24038-0
- Märchen 1946/7
- Der weiße Büffel oder Von der großen Gerechtigkeit, 1946 (written in 1937)
- Der armen Kinder Weihnachten, play, 1946
- Okay oder die Unsterblichen, play, 1946
- Die Gebärde, short stories, 1947
- Der Richter, short story, 1948
- Jahre und Zeiten, memoirs, 1949, ISBN 3-548-22119-X
- Die Mutter, short stories, 1948
- Missa sine Nomine, novel 1950
- Der Exote, novel, 1951
- Die letzten Lieder, poems, 1951
- Es geht ein Pflüger übers Land, short stories chosen by Lilje Wiechert, 1951
- Häftling Nr. 7188, diary entries and letters, 1966
- Vom Trost der Welt, 1938

== Bibliography ==
- Hans Ebeling: Ernst Wiechert. Das Werk des Dichters. Berlin 1937.
- Carol Petersen: Ernst Wiechert. Mensch der Stille. Hamburg: Hansischer Gildenverl. 1947. (= Dichter der Gegenwart; 1)
- Diverse Autoren: Ernst Wiechert. Der Mensch und sein Werk. Eine Anthologie. München: Verl. Kurt Desch. 1951.
- Helmut Ollesch: Ernst Wiechert. 2. Aufl. Wuppertal-Barmen: Müller 1956. (= Dichtung und Deutung; 3)
- Guido Reiner: Ernst-Wiechert-Bibliographie 1916 – 1971, 1. Teil. Paris 1972.
- Jürgen Fangmeier: Ernst Wiechert. Ein theologisches Gespräch mit dem Dichter. Zürich: Theologischer Verl. 1976. (= Theologische Studien; 117) ISBN 3-290-17117-5
- Jörg Hattwig: Das Dritte Reich im Werk Ernst Wiecherts. Geschichtsdenken, Selbstverständnis und literarische Praxis. Frankfurt am Main u.a.: Lang 1984. (= Europäische Hochschulschriften; Reihe 1, Deutsche Sprache und Literatur; 739) ISBN 3-8204-5157-9
- Hugh Alexander Boag: Ernst Wiechert: The Prose Works in Relation to his Life and Times. Stuttgart 1987. (= Stuttgarter Arbeiten zur Germanistik 130)
- William Niven :Ernst Wiechert and his Role between 1933 and 1945. (PDF, 126KB), New German Studies, 16 (1990), 1-20.
- Ernst Wiechert heute, hrsg. v. Guido Reiner u. Klaus Weigelt. Frankfurt am Main: R. G. Fischer, 1993. (= Schriften der Internationalen Ernst-Wiechert-Gesellschaft; 1) ISBN 3-89406-677-6
- Jurgita Katauskien·e: Land und Volk der Litauer im Werk deutscher Schriftsteller des 19./20. Jahrhunderts (H. Sudermann, E. Wiechert, A. Miegel und J. Bobrowski). Vilnius: Verl. Matrica 1997. ISBN 9986-645-04-2
- Annette Schmollinger: "Intra muros et extra". Deutsche Literatur im Exil und in der inneren Emigration. Ein exemplarischer Vergleich. Heidelberg: Winter 1999. (= Beiträge zur neueren Literaturgeschichte; F. 3, Bd. 161) ISBN 3-8253-0954-1
- Zuspruch und Tröstung. Beiträge über Ernst Wiechert und sein Werk. Zum zehnjährigen Bestehen der Internationalen Ernst-Wiechert-Gesellschaft (IEWG), hrsg. v. Hans-Martin Plesske u. Klaus Weigelt. Frankfurt/Main: R. G. Fischer, 1999. (= Schriften der Internationalen Ernst-Wiechert-Gesellschaft; 2) ISBN 3-89501-784-1
- Franz H. Schrage: Weimar - Buchenwald. Spuren nationalsozialistischer Vernichtungsgewalt in Werken von Ernst Wiechert, Eugen Kogon, Jorge Semprun. Düsseldorf: Grupello-Verl. 1999. ISBN 3-933749-08-5
- Von bleibenden Dingen. Über Ernst Wiechert und sein Werk, hrsg. v. Bärbel Beutner u. Hans-Martin Pleßke. Frankfurt am Main: R. G. Fischer, 2002. (= Schriften der Internationalen Ernst-Wiechert-Gesellschaft; 3) ISBN 3-8301-0402-2
- Manfred Franke: Jenseits der Wälder. Der Schriftsteller Ernst Wiechert als politischer Redner und Autor. Köln: SH-Verl. 2003. ISBN 3-89498-126-1
