= The Man Without Qualities =

Unfinished novel by Robert Musil

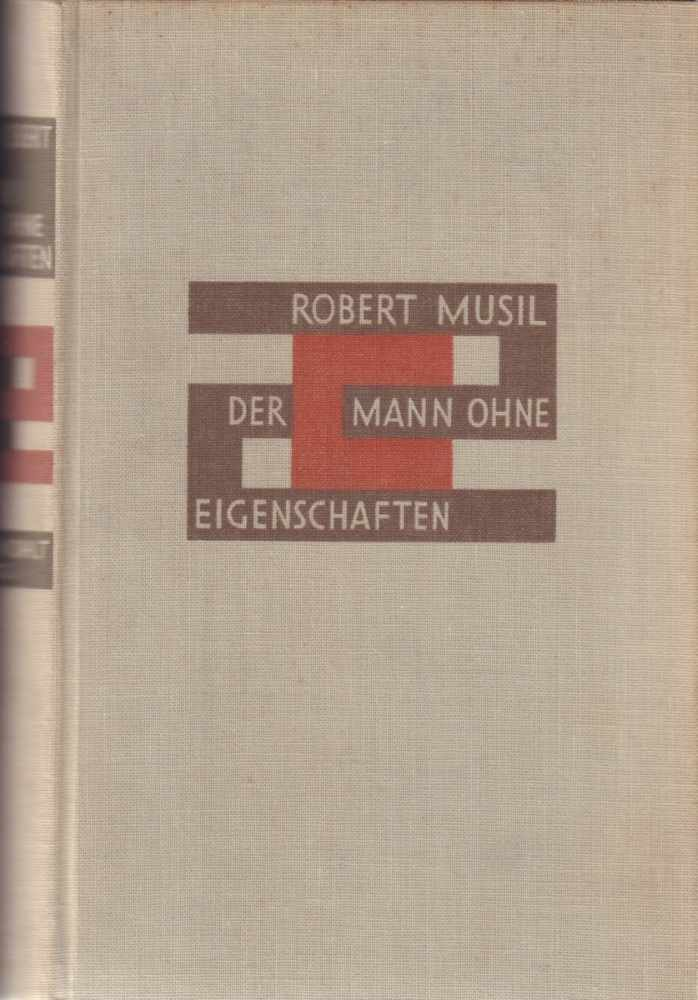
- Cover of the first edition
- Author: Robert Musil
- Original title: Der Mann ohne Eigenschaften
- Language: German
- Publisher: Rowohlt Verlag
- Publication date: 1930–1943
- Publication place: Austria
- Media type: Print (hardcover & paperback)
- Pages: 1,130 (the core text); 1,774 (complete English translation)
- LC Class: PT2625.U8 M3

The Man Without Qualities (German: Der Mann ohne Eigenschaften; 1930–1943) is an unfinished modernist novel in three volumes and various drafts by the Austrian writer Robert Musil.

The novel is a "story of ideas", which takes place in the time of the Austro-Hungarian monarchy's last days. The plot often veers into allegorical digressions on a wide range of existential themes concerning humanity and feelings. It has a particular concern with the values of truth and opinion and how society organizes ideas about life and society. The book is well over a thousand pages long in its entirety, and no single theme dominates.

== Background ==
Musil worked on the novel for more than twenty years. He started in 1921 and spent the rest of his life writing it. When he died in 1942, the novel had not been completed. The 1,074-page Volume 1 (Part I: A Sort of Introduction, and Part II: The Like of It Now Happens) and 605-page Volume 2 (Part III: Into the Millennium (The Criminals)) were published in 1930 and 1933 respectively in Berlin. Part III did not include 20 chapters withdrawn from Vol. 2 of 1933 while in printer's galley proofs. From 1933 until death, Musil was working on Part III. In 1943 in Lausanne, Musil's widow Martha published a 462-page collection of material from literary remains including the 20 galley chapters withdrawn from Part III, as well as drafts of the final incomplete chapters and notes on the development and direction of the novel.

Some of Musil's working titles were The Gutters, Achilles (the original name of the main character Ulrich) or The Spy.

== Plot summary ==
Part I, titled A Sort of Introduction, is an introduction to the protagonist, a mathematician named Ulrich who is in search of a sense of life and reality but fails to find it. His ambivalence towards morals and indifference to life has brought him to the state of being "a man without qualities", depending on the outer world to form his character. A kind of keenly analytical passivity is his most typical attitude.

Musil once said that it is not particularly difficult to describe Ulrich in his main features. Ulrich himself only knows he is strangely indifferent to all his qualities. Lack of any profound essence and ambiguity as a general attitude to life are his principal characteristics.

Meanwhile, we meet a murderer and rapist, Moosbrugger, who is condemned for his murder of a prostitute. Other protagonists are Ulrich's mistress, Bonadea, and Clarisse, his friend Walter's neurotic wife, whose refusal to go along with commonplace existence leads to her insanity.

In Part II, Pseudoreality Prevails, Ulrich joins the so-called "Collateral Campaign" or "Parallel Campaign", preparations for a celebration in honor of 70 years of the Austrian Emperor Franz Joseph I's reign. That same year, 1918, the German Emperor Wilhelm II would have been ruler of his country for 30 years. This coincidence prompts Count Leinsdorf to suggest the creation of a committee to explore a suitable way to demonstrate Austria's political, cultural, and philosophical supremacy via a festival which will capture the minds of the Austrian Emperor's subjects and people of the world forever. On that account, many bright and vague ideas and visions are discussed (e.g., The Year of Austria, The World Year, The Austrian Peace Year or The Austrian World Peace Year).

A couple of people take part in the organization team or catch the eye of Ulrich. Ermelinda Tuzzi, called Diotima, is Ulrich's cousin as well as the wife of a civil servant; she tries to become a Viennese muse of philosophy, inspiring whomever she invites to her salon; she brings both Ulrich and Arnheim, a Prussian business magnate and prosaic writer (whose character is based on the figure of Walther Rathenau) into her sphere. The nobleman in charge of the Campaign, the old conservative Count Leinsdorf, is incapable of deciding or even of not-deciding. General Stumm von Bordwehr of the Imperial and Royal Army is unpopular for his attempts in this generally mystical atmosphere to push the Campaign in a martial direction whereas German businessman Paul Arnheim, while an admirer of Diotima's combination of beauty and spirit, doesn't feel the need to marry her.

While most of the participants (Diotima most feverishly) try to associate the reign of Franz Joseph I with vague ideas of humanity, progress, tradition, and happiness, the followers of Realpolitik see a chance to exploit the situation: Stumm von Bordwehr wishes to get the Austrian army income raised and Arnheim plans to buy oil fields in Galicia and Lodomeria. Musil's great irony and satire is that the planned celebration of international peace and imperial unity slides into national chauvinism, war, and imperial collapse. The novel thus provides an analysis of political and cultural processes that contributed to the outbreak of World War I.

Part III, entitled Into the Millennium (The Criminals), is about Ulrich's sister Agathe (who enters the novel at the end of Part II). They experience a mystically incestuous stirring upon meeting after their father's death. They see themselves as soulmates, or, as the book says, "Siamese twins".

As it was published, the novel ends in a large section of drafts, notes, false-starts and forays written by Musil as he tried to work out the proper ending for his book. In the German edition, there is even a CD-ROM available that holds thousands of pages of alternative versions and drafts.

== Style and themes ==
Musil's aim (and that of his main character, Ulrich) was to arrive at a synthesis between strict scientific fact and the mystical, which he refers to as "the hovering life".

Musil's novel contains more than 1,700 pages (depending on edition) in three volumes, the last of which was published by Musil's wife after his death. The novel is famous for the irony with which Musil depicts Austrian society shortly before World War I.

The story takes place in 1913 in Vienna, the capital of Austria-Hungary, which Musil refers to by the playful term Kakanien (Kakania in the Wilkins-Pike translation). The name Kakanien is derived from the German abbreviation K und K (pronounced [ka ʊn ka]) for kaiserlich und königlich or "Imperial and Royal", used to indicate the status of Austria-Hungary as a Dual Monarchy. But 'kaka' is also a child's word for faeces in German, just as in English, in the Spanish caca, in the Italian cacca and in the Russian кака. Also, 'kakos' is a Greek term for bad borrowed by a number of words in German and English, and Musil uses the expression to symbolise the lack of political, administrative and sentimental coherence in Austria-Hungary.

Musil elaborates on the paradoxes of the Kakanian way of life: "By its constitution it was liberal, but the system of government was clerical. The system of government was clerical, but the general attitude to life was liberal. Before the law all citizens were equal, but not everyone, of course, was a citizen. There was a parliament, but it used freedom in such an excessive way that it was kept almost always closed."

The story contains approximately twenty characters of bizarre Viennese life, from the beau monde to the demi-monde, including an aristocrat, an army officer, a banker, three bourgeois wives, an intriguing chambermaid, a black pageboy, and last but not least a man who murders a prostitute.

The novel is told in the third-person omniscient point of view.

According to Italian writer Alberto Arbasino, Federico Fellini's film 8½ (1963) used similar artistic procedures and had parallels with Musil's novel.

There are strong autobiographical features to be found in the text as the main characters' ideas and attitudes are believed to be those of Musil. Most of the aspects of the Viennese life in the novel are based on history and Musil's life. The plot and the characters (with the exception of a short appearance of the Austrian emperor Franz Joseph I) are invented (although some of them had inspirations in eminent Austrians and Germans). Elsa (Berta) von Czuber, whom Musil met while he studied in Brno between 1889 and 1901, inspired him with the image of Ulrich's sister Agathe. Donath and Alice Charlemont, Musil's friends, were models of Walter and Clarisse and Viennese socialite Eugenie Schwarzwald gave birth to the character of Diotima. Arnheim may have been based on Walther Rathenau and Thomas Mann.

His detailed portrait of a decaying fin de siècle world is similar to those of Hermann Broch's The Sleepwalkers, Karl Kraus' The Last Days of Mankind or Stefan Zweig's The World of Yesterday.

== Publication ==
Musil originally opposed publishing only sections of his still unfinished work and later regretted submitting to his publisher's insistence, because what was already printed could not be subjected to further amendments. Some chapters were redacted by Musil from the printers after he had already sent them for publication. Critics speculate on the viability of Musil's original conception. Some estimate the intended length of the work to be twice as long as the text that survives.

The Man Without Qualities Vol. 1 was first published in English translation in 1953 by Eithne Wilkins and Ernst Kaiser. Vol. 2 followed in 1955, and Vol. 3 in 1961 (London: Secker & Warburg, 1953, 1954, 1960; New York: Coward-McCann, Inc., first US editions). They were titled: Vol. 1 – A Sort of Introduction, The Like of It Now Happens (I); Vol. 2 – The Like of It Now Happens (II); Vol. 3 – Into the Millennium (III) (The Criminals), and had xxxv+365, vii+454, xi+445 pages respectively.

In 1996 Knopf published a new two-volume edition (1,774 pages) in English translation by Sophie Wilkins and Burton Pike. Parts I and II are in Vol. 1, while Part III, the twenty galley chapters, and unfinished chapters, are in Vol. 2. The translation received a special citation for the PEN Translation Prize.

In 2020, New York Review Books published Agathe or, the Forgotten Sister, which is "drawn from part 3 of The Man Without Qualities and also includes "the first eight of the Druckfahnen (galley proof) chapters he withdrew from publication in 1938" and "manuscript continuations of galley chapters". Agathe or, the Forgotten Sister is translated by Joel Agee.

== Reception ==
Ernst von Salomon wrote in 1953 that the best way to read the book is to read one or two chapters per day, which will make the experience comparable to drinking a glass of champagne.

Writing about Musil in The New Criterion, Roger Kimball wrote, "Whatever else one can say about it, The Man Without Qualities stands as one of the great modern works of satire."

In his The Long Firm (1999), Jake Arnott references the book through the musings of one of his characters, an academic working with prisoners. He quotes Musil "If mankind could dream collectivity it would dream Moosbrugger".

Robert McCrum ranked it one of the top 10 books of the 20th century: "This is a meditation on the plight of the little man lost in a great machine. One of Europe's unquestioned 20th-century masterpieces."

Writing about the Wilkins-Pike translation in The New York Times, Michael Hofmann wrote "Of all the great European novelists of the first third of the century – Marcel Proust, James Joyce, Franz Kafka, Thomas Mann, Virginia Woolf – Robert Musil is far and away the least read; and yet he's as shapely as Gibbon, as mordant as Voltaire, as witty as Oscar Wilde and as indecent as Arthur Schnitzler."

== Legacy ==
Musil's almost daily preoccupation with writing left his family in dire financial straits. The book brought neither fame nor fortune to him or his family. This was one of the reasons why he felt bitter and unrecognized during the last two decades of his life. The combination of poverty and a multitude of ideas is one of the most striking characteristics of Musil's biography.

Nicolas Mahler made a 156 pages long comic-book adaptation of the novel, published in 2013.

== See also ==
- Bokklubben World Library
- Le Monde's 100 Books of the Century
- Best German Novels of the Twentieth Century
- Value theory

== Sources ==
- Jonsson, Stefan (2000). Subject Without Nation: Robert Musil and the History of Modern Identity. Durham and London: Duke University Press. ISBN 0-8223-2570-5.
- McBride, Patrizia C. (2006). The Void of Ethics: Robert Musil and the Experience of Modernity. Evanston, Ill.: Northwestern University Press. ISBN 0-8101-2108-5.
- Payne, Philip; Bartram, Graham; Tihanov, Galin, eds. (2007). A Companion to the Works of Robert Musil. Rochester, NY: Camden House. ISBN 978-1-57113-110-2.
- Pike, Burton (1972) [1961]. Robert Musil: An Introduction to His Work (Reissued ed.). Kennikat Press. ISBN 0-8046-1546-2.
- Sebastian, Thomas (2005). The Intersection of Science and Literature in Musil's 'The Man Without Qualities'. Rochester, NY: Camden House. ISBN 1-57113-116-7.
- Stoicea, Gabriela (2018). Moosbrugger and the Case for Responsibility in Robert Musil's "Der Mann ohne Eigenschaften". The German Quarterly, vol. 91, no. 1, pp. 49-66.
