= The Rebellion =

The Rebellion may refer to:

- La Rebelión - 1986 salsa song released by Joe Arroyo
- Rebellion (novel), original German title "Die Rebellion" - 1924 novel by the Austrian writer Joseph Roth
- Rebel Alliance, aka "The Rebellion" - a stateless coalition of rebel dissidents and defectors in the fictional world of the Star Wars franchise
- The Rebellion (MLS supporters association)

== See also ==
- Rebellion (disambiguation)
