= Radetzky (disambiguation) =

Radetzky may refer to:

== People ==
- House of Radetzky von Radetz, a Czech noble family originating in 14th century Kingdom of Bohemia
  - Joseph Radetzky von Radetz (1766–1858), Czech nobleman and a general in the Habsburg military
- Fyodor Radetzky (1820-1890), Russian general
- Sascha Radetsky, American Ballet Theatre soloist

== Art ==
- Radetzky March, march by Johann Strauss I, dedicated to the Habsburg general
- Radetzky March (novel), named after the march

== Other uses ==
- SMS Radetzky, battleship named after Joseph Radetzky
  - Radetzky-class battleship, ship class named after the battleship
- Radetzky (steamship), named after Joseph Radetzky
  - Radetski, a village in Sliven Province, Bulgaria, named after the steamship
