= Patrick Vogel =

German operatic tenor

Patrick Vogel (* 1982 in Berlin) is a German operatic tenor.

== Life and career ==
Vogel grew up in Berlin, where he lived with his father from the age of 9 after his parents' divorce. He trained as a bicycle mechanic, started classical singing the age of 18, and begann to study singing at the Hochschule für Musik "Hanns Eisler" a year later with Roman Trekel and Snezana Brzakovic.

=== Opera ===
Vogel made his debut at Berlin State Opera in 2005 as third Esquire in Wagner's Parsifal. He joined the International Opera Studio Zürich for the 2010/11 and 2011/12 seasons, where he sang Lysander and Snout in Britten's A Midsummer Nights's Dream in German, followed by an engagement as lyric tenor at Stadttheater Klagenfurt in the 2012/13 season. In Summer 2013 he sang Spärlich and Fenton in Otto Nicolai's The Merry Wives of Windsor at Operklosterneuburg, the following year Ping Schma Fu in the world premier of Peter Ronnefeld's chamber opera Nachtausgabe in Dresden, and Jonas in Zeisls Hiob at the Bavarian State Opera. In 2015 Vogel was Edward Fairfax Vere in Britten's Billy Budd in a performance at Teatro Carlo Felice in Genoa, and joined the ensemble of the Leipzig Opera. In 2016 he was a guest at Teatro Carlo Felice as Narraboth in Strauss' Salome, and Don Ottavio in Mozart's Don Giovanni both with conductor Fabio Luisi. He sang the Lamplighter and the Dance Master in a concert performance of Puccini's Manon Lescaut at the Salzburg Festival, Elemer in Strauss' Arabella and Walther von der Vogelweide in Wagner's Tannhäuser as a guest at Semperoper Dresden in 2018, and the Painter in Alban Berg's Lulu in Leipzig. In 2019 he made his debut at the Salzburg Easter Festival as Eißlinger in Die Meistersinger von Nürnberg with conductor Christian Thielemann. He attended a master class by Dietrich Fischer-Dieskau in 2007, and by Brigitte Fassbaender in 2017.

Opera repertoire
role	opera	composer
Tamino	The Magic Flute	Wolfgang Amadeus Mozart
Lord Arturo Bucklaw	Lucia di Lammermoor	Gaetano Donizetti
Alfredo	La traviata	Giuseppe Verdi
Gastone	La traviata	Giuseppe Verdi
Valzacchi	Der Rosenkavalier	Richard Strauss
Malcolm	Macbeth	Giuseppe Verdi
Edwin	Die Csárdásfürstin	Emmerich Kálmán
Graf Elemer	Arabella	Richard Strauss
Walther von der Vogelweide	Tannhäuser	Richard Wagner
Ulrich Eißlinger	Die Meistersinger von Nürnberg	Richard Wagner
Maître de ballet, Lampionaio	Manon Lescaut	Giacomo Puccini
Hans	The Bartered Bride	Bedrich Smetana
Hunter	Rusalka	Antonín Dvořák
Nick	La fanciulla del West	Giacomo Puccini
Der Maler	Lulu	Alban Berg
Don Ottavio	Don Giovanni	Wolfgang Amadeus Mozart
Narraboth	Salome	Richard Strauss
Edward Fairfax Vere	Billy Budd	Benjamin Britten
Pang	Turandot	Giacomo Puccini
Flamand	Capriccio	Richard Strauss
Lysander	A Midsummer Night's Dream	Benjamin Britten
Snout	A Midsummer Night's Dream	Benjamin Britten
Kilian	Der Freischütz	Carl Maria von Weber
Ping Schma Fu	Nachtausgabe	Peter Ronnefeld
Spärlich	The Merry Wives of Windsor	Otto Nicolai
Fenton	The Merry Wives of Windsor	Otto Nicolai
Jonas	Zeisls Hiob	Erich Zeisl

=== Concerts ===
As concert soloist Vogel sang the Evangelist in Bach's St Matthew Passion under conductor Helmuth Rilling 2013 in Chile, the tenor solos in Niels Wilhelm Gade's Korsfarerne, Op. 50 (The Crusaders) with Sing-Akademie zu Berlin in 2017, and 2018 the Verdi's Requiem at the Konzerthaus Berlin.

== Recordings ==
=== Audio ===
- 2009: Frohlocke nun! Berliner Weihnachtsmusiken zwischen Barock und Romantik. Lautten Compagney, tenor soloist Patrick Vogel, conductor Kai-Uwe Jirka. Carus-Verlag (8344200)
- 2015: Antonio Salieri: La scuola de' gelosi. Conductor Werner Ehrhardt, with Emanuele D'Aguanno as Count Bandiera, Francesca Lombardi Mazzulli as Countess Bandiera, Patrick Vogel as the Lieutenant. Deutsche Harmonia Mundi (00761)
- 2018: The World of Dido. Works by Morley, Purcell, Byrd. Univocale chamber choir and orchestra, conductor Christoph Dominik Ostendorf.

=== Video ===
- 2011: Gioachino Rossini: Le comte Ory. Directed by Olivier Simonnet, conducted by Muhai Tang. With Javier Camarena as Count Ory, Cecilia Bartoli as Comtesse Adèle. Patrick Vogel is credited as "Mainfory", a chorus member.
