= Best German Novels of the Twentieth Century =

1999 list by German literary critics

The Best German Novels of the Twentieth Century is a list of books compiled in 1999 by Literaturhaus München and Bertelsmann, in which 99 prominent German authors, literary critics, and scholars of German ranked the most significant German-language novels of the twentieth century. The group brought together 33 experts from each of the three categories. Each was allowed to name three books as having been the most important of the century. Cited by the group were five titles each by Franz Kafka and Arno Schmidt, four by Robert Walser, and three each by Thomas Mann, Hermann Broch, Anna Seghers and Joseph Roth.

== Top 10 ==
#	Year	Title	Author
1	1930 (Volume 1); 1933 (Volume 2); 1943 (Volume 3)	The Man Without Qualities; Der Mann ohne Eigenschaften	Robert Musil
2	1925	The Trial; Der Prozess	Franz Kafka
3	1924	The Magic Mountain; Der Zauberberg	Thomas Mann
4	1929	Berlin Alexanderplatz	Alfred Döblin
5	1959	The Tin Drum; Die Blechtrommel	Günter Grass
6	1970 (Volume 1); 1971 (Volume 2); 1973 (Volume 3); 1983 (Volume 4)	Anniversaries. From the Life of Gesine Cresspahl; Jahrestage 1-4: Aus dem Leben von Gesine Cresspahl	Uwe Johnson
7	1901	Buddenbrooks; Buddenbrooks: Verfall einer Familie	Thomas Mann
8	1932	Radetzky March; Radetzkymarsch	Joseph Roth
9	1926	The Castle; Das Schloss	Franz Kafka
10	1947	Doctor Faustus; Doktor Faustus	Thomas Mann

== See also ==
- NRC's Best Dutch novels
