= Verlag Die Schmiede =

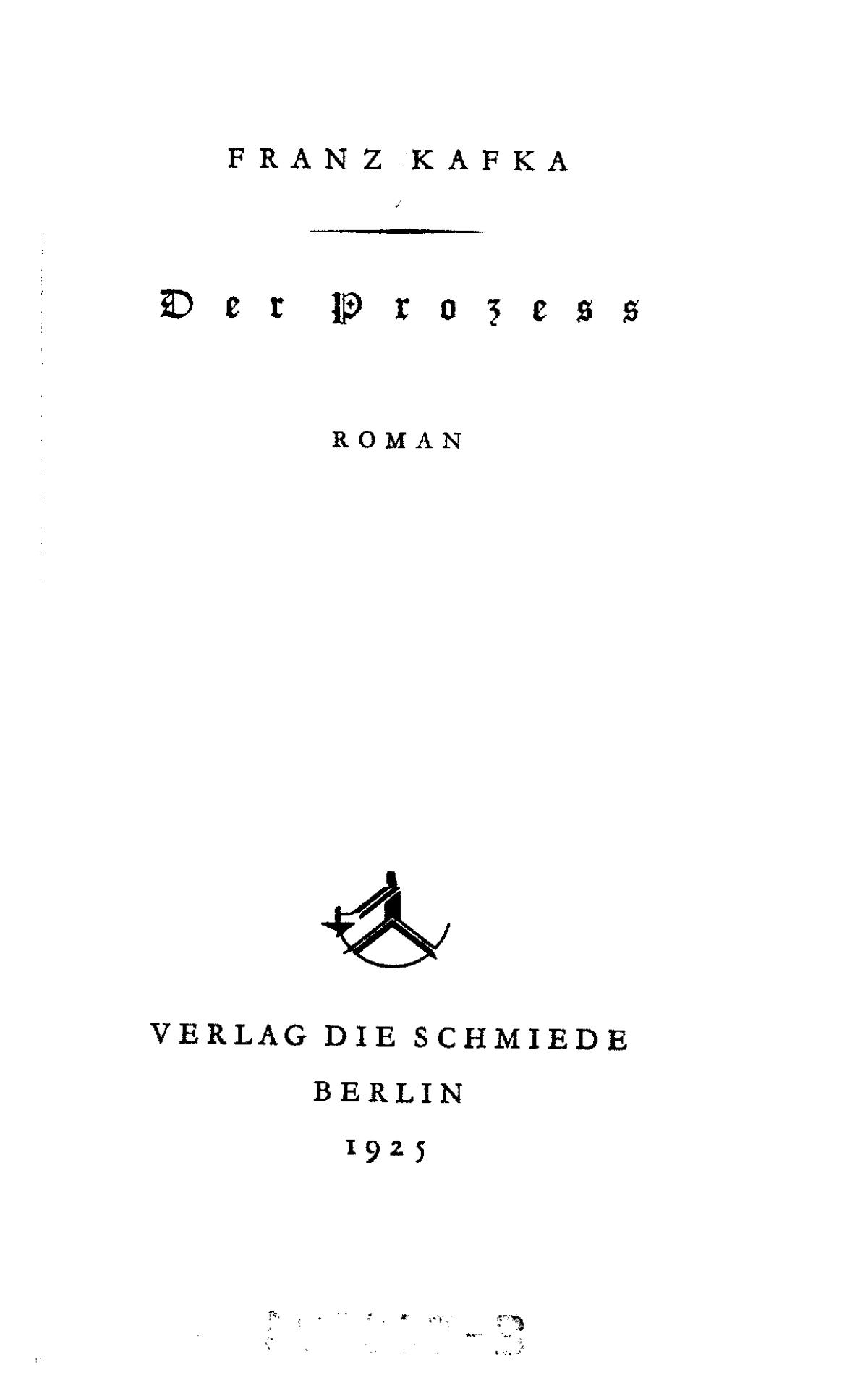

Verlag Die Schmiede was an avant-garde literature publishing house in the 1920s in Berlin. It published works by Franz Kafka, Alfred Döblin, Joseph Roth, Rudolf Leonhard, and many more. Most of its dust jackets were designed by George Salter, later a US citizen.

Leonhard was employed as a reader and editor from 1919.

The publisher was the first to publish Kafka's story collection Ein Hungerkünstler in 1924 and his novel Der Process in 1925, after the author's death. Kafka had prepared the collection for print, his friend Max Brod the novel.

Roth's novels Hotel Savoy and Rebellion were first published in 1924.

Rudolf Schottlaender's first translation of the first part of À la recherche du temps perdu was published under the title of Der Weg zu Swann (The way to Swann).

== Bibliography ==
- Wolfgang U. Schütte: Der Verlag Die Schmiede 1921–1931. In: Marginalien. Zeitschrift für Buchkunst & Bibliophilie. Neunzigstes Heft, 2/1983, Page 10-35(including Bibliography)
