= Rebellion (disambiguation) =

Rebellion is a defiance of authority.

Rebellion may also refer to:

== Film ==
- Rebellion (1936 film), an American film starring Tom Keene
- Rebellion (1954 film), a Spanish-German drama film
- Rebellion (1975 film), an Argentine film
- Rebellion (2009 film), a Hong Kong film
- Rebellion (2011 film), a French film
- Rebellion (2021 film)
- Rebellion, the Japanese title of the 2002 American Equilibrium

== Music ==
- Rebellion (band), a German heavy metal band
- Rebellion Festival, an annual punk rock festival held (mostly) in Blackpool, England
- Rebellion (EP), a 1995 EP by Samael
- "Rebellion" (song), a 2014 song by Linkin Park
- "Rebellion (The Clans Are Marching)", a song by Grave Digger from Tunes of War
- "Rebellion (Lies)", a 2005 song by Arcade Fire
- "Rebellion" (Britney Spears song), a 2006 song by Britney Spears
- La Rebelión - 1986 salsa song released by Joe Arroyo

== Sport ==
- Rebellion Racing, a Swiss motor racing team
- Rhode Island Rebellion, an American rugby league team
- WWE Rebellion, a former annual professional wrestling pay-per-view event held by World Wrestling Entertainment
- Impact Wrestling Rebellion, a current annual professional wrestling pay-per-view event held by Impact Wrestling

== Other ==
- Rebellion (miniseries), a 2016 Irish television miniseries
  - Resistance (miniseries), a RTÉ sequel series set during the Irish War of Independence, produced by Zodiac Media
- Rebellion (novel), a 1924 novel by Joseph Roth
- Extinction Rebellion, environmental campaign
- Rebellion Developments, a British video game developer and comic book publisher
- Rebellions (company), a South Korean semiconductor company
- Rebellion, a sword used by Dante in the Devil May Cry video game series
- Rebellion, an episode of Transformers: Prime
- Rebel Alliance, a faction in Star Wars
- Teenage rebellion
