= Sins of Man =

1936 film by Otto Brower, Gregory Ratoff

- Theatrical release poster
- Directed by: Otto Brower; Gregory Ratoff
- Written by: Ossip Dymow; Samuel G. Engel; Frederick Kohner
- Based on: Job by Joseph Roth
- Produced by: Kenneth Macgowan
- Starring: Jean Hersholt; Don Ameche; Allen Jenkins
- Cinematography: Sidney Wagner
- Edited by: Barbara McLean
- Music by: Alexis Arkhangelsky; R.H. Bassett; Hugo Friedhofer
- Production company: 20th Century Fox
- Distributed by: 20th Century Fox
- Release date: June 19, 1936
- Running time: 86 minutes
- Country: United States
- Language: English

Sins of Man is a 1936 American period drama film directed by Otto Brower and starring Jean Hersholt, Don Ameche and Allen Jenkins. It was produced and released by 20th Century Fox. It is based on the 1930 novel Job by Joseph Roth.

== Plot ==
In the town of Schanbrock, Tyrol, Austria, church bell ringer Kristopher Freyman and his wife Freida have one son, Karl, who is very intelligent and wants to become an inventor. They have a second son Gabriel, but his wife dies shortly after childbirth. A few months later, Freyman notices Gabriel is not learning to speak and a doctor’s examination reveals that he was born deaf. A priest at the church predicts that “Gabriel will be healed.”

Karl becomes interested in airplanes and secretly emigrates to America to further his interest in aeronautical engineering, suddenly disappearing overnight leaving only a short note to his father. Kristopher is so distraught that his first son has left that he disowns him, and vacillates between praying nightly that he would return and wishing him dead. The years pass and Gabriel does not recover his hearing, Kristopher becomes more and more distraught, having lost both his wife and his elder son, and praying every day that his disabled son will regain his hearing.

One day Freyman notices that Gabriel smiles as he repeatedly taps on a glass of water and makes it "Ding," and a doctor tells Kristopher that Gabriel may recover his hearing with an operation, but the only doctor doing that type of surgery is in New York. One day, their friend and neighbor, Anton Engel gets a letter from Karl in America asking about his father, saying that he has not returned any of his letters. Karl’s letter talks about his engineering work, and enclosed is a picture of Karl and his airplane, which they think is “a new kind of car.” Karl sends his father a steamship ticket to America and Freyman travels to America to see him, but is not allowed to bring Gabriel along because immigration laws do not allow disabled foreigners from entering the United States unless it is just temporary for medical care, and families must post a bond in advance to cover their expenses.

Kristopher travels to America, leaving Gabriel in the care of Anton’s family. He is jubilant when he sees Karl, who is now a successful aeronautics engineer and pilot. Karl’s employer offers to post the bond to bring Gabriel to America. Karl's job sends him on a flight to Washington, DC to demonstrate a new airplane, with company executives and a crowd cheering him on the journey and his father proudly seeing him off. The next day, when he tries to contact his son, he is informed that the plane crashed and Karl has died. After his burial, Freyman has no choice but to return to Austria, books his passage on a steamer to sail August 2, 1914, but on getting ready to board, news breaks out that Germany has declared war on Russia - World War I has begun. All travel to Europe is canceled. Kristopher frantically searches through the lists of casualties posted at the Austria-Hungarian Consulate, and is told that Schenbrock was bombed and totally destroyed. His son Gabriel is listed as “Dead or missing.” Freyman is trapped in the US with no family, no money, and no job.

Freyman grows older barely earning enough for room and board doing odd jobs. While scrubbing the floors at a music store one day, his boss plays a recording of “Bells Symphony” by a famous Italian composer, Mario Singarelli. Freyman gives up three days’ salary to buy the recording and takes it to his rooming house, but they all laugh at him when they hear the recording of church bells. One of them takes Freyman’s side and convinces the others that there is a positive message in the music, and they all quiet down and listen. He next takes a job as a sign walker in front of Carnegie Hall for 50 cents a day. A passerby notices that he is elderly and weak, barely able to walk with the heavy sign, and lifts it off his shoulders. Freyman had been so weary that he first only reads the sign when it is hanging on the other man’s shoulders, and sees that it announces the famous composer, Singarelli, coming to Carnegie Hall from Europe. He spends his entire two weeks pay to get tickets to see the concert, and while there Singarelli leads the orchestra on the Bells Symphony, Kristopher is emotionally overcome as he hears the same melody he used to play for his church in Austria. He begs to meet Singarelli, thinking that he must have been one of his choir boys because he played it exactly the same way that he had played the bells in Schanbrock, Austria, but he is not allowed backstage. He leaves several messages, but is laughed away until he gives up.

(Spoiler Alert) Singarelli’s assistant later happens to mention that “an old fool” has been trying to find him, but he threw the message away. Singarelli then insists on meeting the old man and they find him at an inn, where he is working as a dishwasher. When Singarelli arrives at the inn, the patrons greet him with admiration, but try to discourage him from meeting the old man, as he is a mere dishwasher and could not possibly be of any importance. Singarelli insists, and upon meeting him, he and Freyman talk about pre-war Schanbrock, Austria. Singarelli tells him that he was adopted by an Italian family during the war, and it turns out that Singarelli is actually Freyman’s long lost son Gabriel, whose hearing was miraculously restored during the war.

== Cast ==
- Jean Hersholt as Christopher Freyman
- Don Ameche as Karl Freyman / Mario Signarelli
- Allen Jenkins as Crusty
- J. Edward Bromberg as Anton Engel
- Ann Shoemaker as Anna Engel
- DeWitt Jennings as Twichelesko
- Fritz Leiber as Father Prior
- Francis Ford as Town Drunk
- Christian Rub as Fritz
- Adrian Rosley as Singarelli's Butler
- Gene Reynolds as Karl Freyman as a Boy
- Mickey Rentschler as Gabriel Freyman as a Boy
- John Miltern as Mr. Hall
- Paul Stanton as Minister
- Edward Van Sloan as Austrian Army Doctor
