= The Legend of the Holy Drinker (film) =

La leggenda del santo bevitore
- Theatrical release poster by Renato Casaro
- Directed by: Ermanno Olmi
- Written by: Ermanno Olmi; Tullio Kezich
- Starring: Rutger Hauer
- Cinematography: Dante Spinotti
- Edited by: Paolo Cottignola; Ermanno Olmi; Fabio Olmi
- Music by: José Padilla Sánchez; Ilter Pelosi; Igor Stravinsky
- Production company: Cecchi Gori Group
- Distributed by: Columbia Pictures Italia
- Release date: 2 September 1988
- Running time: 127 minutes
- Countries: Italy; France
- Budget: $5.4 million

The Legend of the Holy Drinker (Italian: La leggenda del santo bevitore) is a 1988 Italian film written and directed by Ermanno Olmi.

The film won the Golden Lion at the 45th Venice Film Festival. It also won four David di Donatello Awards (for Best Film, Best Director, Best Cinematography and Best Editing) and two Silver Ribbons (for Best Director and Best Screenplay). The film was selected as the Italian entry for the Best Foreign Language Film at the 61st Academy Awards, but was not accepted as a nominee.

It is based on the 1939 novella of the same name by the Austrian novelist Joseph Roth.

== Plot ==
A drunken homeless man (Rutger Hauer) in Paris is lent 200 francs by a stranger as long as he promises to repay it to a local church when he can afford to; the film depicts the man's constant frustrations as he attempts to do so.

== Cast ==
- Rutger Hauer as Andreas Kartack
- Sandrine Dumas as Gabby
- Dominique Pinon as Woitech
- Anthony Quayle as The Distinguished Gentleman
- Sophie Segalen as Karoline
- Cécile Paoli as Fur Store Seller
- Jean-Maurice Chanet as Daniel Kanjak
- Dalila Belatreche as Thérèse
