= Confession of a Murderer =

1936 novel by Joseph Roth

- Author: Joseph Roth
- Original title: Beichte eines Mörders
- Translator: Desmond I. Vesey
- Language: German
- Publisher: A. de Lange
- Publication date: 1936
- Publication place: Netherlands
- English publication date: 1937
- Pages: 262

Confession of a Murderer (German: Beichte eines Mörders) is a 1936 novel by the Austrian writer Joseph Roth. It has the subtitle Told in One Night (Erzählt in einer Nacht). The narrative focuses on a Russian exile, Golubchik, who tells what he claims is his life's story to a group of people, including Roth, in a restaurant in Paris.

== Reception ==
James A. Snead of The New York Times wrote in 1985: "Roth's night-story implicitly identifies the twilight of the Austro-Hungarian Empire with Golubchik's private 'tragedy of banality.' His futile search for paternity, homeland and revenge, ranging over 'Old Europe' from Odessa to Paris, is an ambivalent elegy to a lost epoch. The double narration creates an air of evasiveness and manipulation that mirrors the intrigues of the state bureaucracies Golubchik encounters."

== See also ==
- 1936 in literature
- Austrian literature
