= La scuola de' gelosi =

Opera by Antonio Salieri

- Dramma giocoso by Antonio Salieri
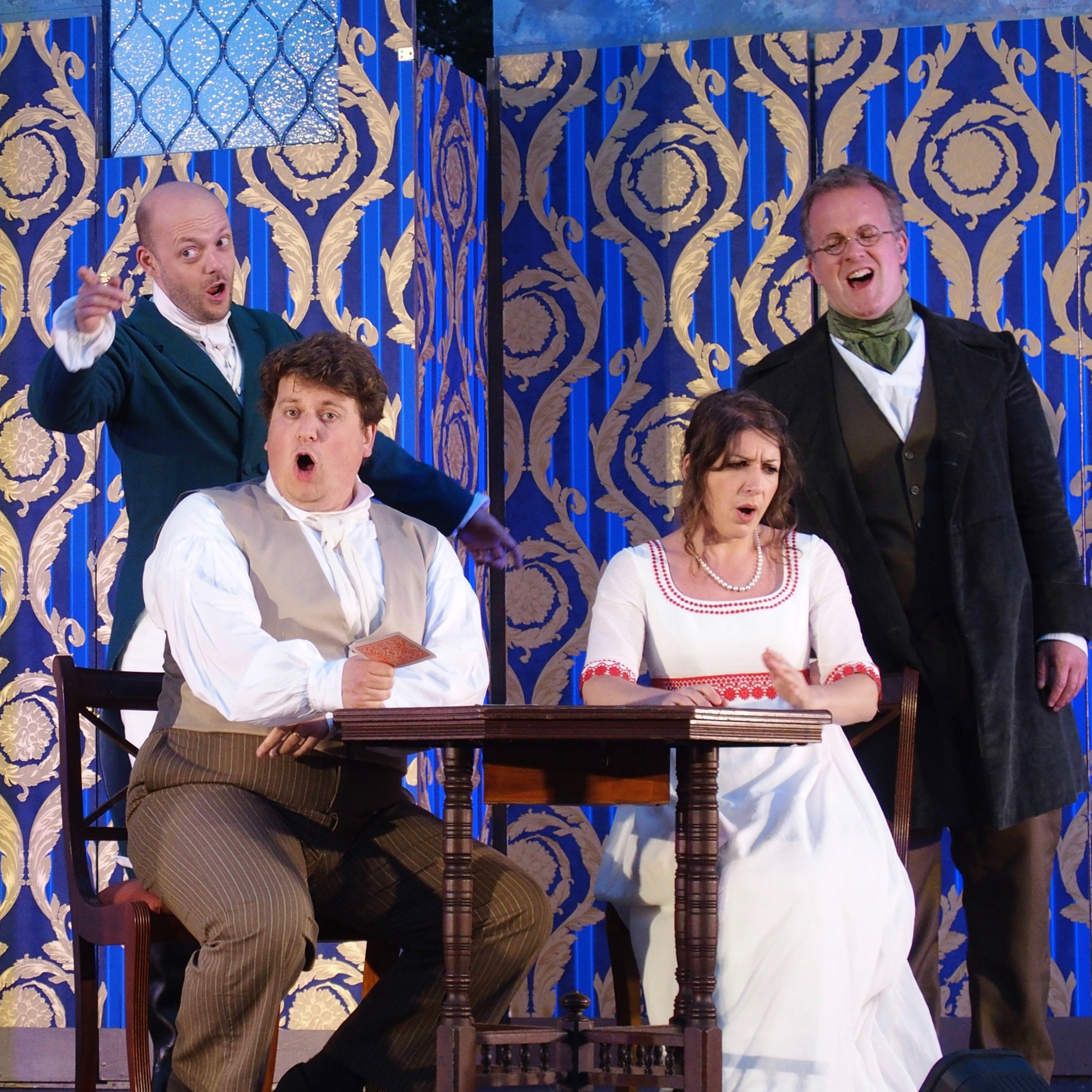
- Production of the Bampton Classical Opera in 2017
- Librettist: Caterino Mazzolà
- Language: Italian
- Premiere: 27 December 1778; Teatro San Moisè, Venice

La scuola de' gelosi (School for the Jealous) is a dramma giocoso in two acts by Antonio Salieri, set to a libretto by Caterino Mazzolà.

== Performance history ==
It was first performed at the Teatro San Moisè in Venice on 27 December 1778. In 1783 it was given at the Burgtheater in Vienna to inaugurate the reestablishment of the Italian opera troupe. Salieri revised the score for the 1783 performances, creating new arias and expanding the role of woodwinds and brass in the scoring of the work. The cast included Francesco Benucci as Blasio and Nancy Storace as the countess, the original Figaro and Susanna in Mozart's The Marriage of Figaro. It reached London in 1786, where, as in many other European cities, it enjoyed great success. Joseph Haydn composed two insertion arias for the work, one lost, the surviving aria, "Dice benissimo", for the bass role Lumaca and orchestra, H. 24b/5.

Among the many admirers of the opera was Johann Wolfgang von Goethe, who wrote to Charlotte von Stein in a letter dated 28 August 1784:

Yesterday’s opera was charming, and well executed, it was the Scuola de Gelosi, Music by Salieri, opera favourite of the public, and the public is right. There is an astonishing richness, variety, and everything is treated with a very delicate taste. My heart was moved by every tune, especially the finales and quintets which are admirable. (Note: "L’Opera d’hier etoit charmant, et bien executé, c’etoit la Scuola de Gelosi, Musique de Salieri, opera favori du public, et le public a raison. Il y a une richesse, une varieté etonnantes, et le tout est traité avec un gout tres delicat. Mon coeur t’appelloit a chaque air, surtout au finales et au quintets qui sont admirables." Goethes Briefe an Frau Von Stein, edited Adolf Schöll and Wilhelm Fielick, Literarische Anhalt, Frankfurt am Main, 1885, p211)

On 28 August 1784, Goethe was in Braunschweig. A production of the opera there in 1782 has been recorded.

The first modern revival was in concert in Leverkusen in 2015 (with recording). A production opened in Legnano, Italy (Salieri's birthplace) late in 2016 and subsequently toured to Jesi and Florence. A further new production created by the Theater an der Wien opened at the Kammeropera, Vienna in May 2017 and transferred to Cologne in 2019. Bampton Classical Opera presented the UK modern première in 2017. In 2022 a production at the Teatro Regio in Turin used an edition with four arias added for the 1783 Vienna performances.

The South American première was given in 2017 in Montevideo by Ópera Joven ('Youth Opera') of Uruguay, in a co-production with Sodre, the public broadcasting organisation of Uruguay. A video of the production is available on YouTube. The U.S. premiere was performed by Pacific Opera Project in Los Angeles, CA in January 2025.

== Roles ==
Cast	Voice type	Premiere, 27 December 1778 (Conductor: – )
Count Bandiera	tenor	
Countess Bandiera	soprano	
Blasio, a grain dealer	bass	
Ernestina, his wife	soprano	
Lumaca, Blasio's servant	bass	
Carlotta, a chambermaid	soprano	
The Lieutenant, Blasio's cousin and a friend of the count	tenor	

== Synopsis ==
The plot of the opera involves love intrigues, attempted seductions and provocations to jealousy between members of the three different social strata: the aristocracy, the bourgeoisie and the working class. The role of the Lieutenant is a close parallel to that of Don Alfonso in Mozart's Così fan tutte.

== Recordings ==
- Salieri: La scuola de' gelosi, Emiliano d'Aguanno, Francesca Lombardi Mazzulli, Federico Sacchi, Roberta Mameli, Florian Gotz, Milena Storti, Patrick Vogel; L`arte del mondo, Werner Ehrhardt DHM 2016
