= What I Saw: Reports from Berlin, 1920–1933 =

1996 book by Joseph Roth

- Editor: Michael Hofmann
- Author: Joseph Roth
- Language: German
- Publication date: 1996
- ISBN: 978-0-393-32582-9

What I Saw: Reports from Berlin, 1920–1933 (German: Joseph Roth in Berlin: Ein Lesebuch für Spaziergänger) is a book of reportage by the writer Joseph Roth from the era of the Weimar Republic. The selection of pieces from Roth's large journalistic output was made by Michael Bienert and published in German in 1996. The English translation with the present title was made by Michael Hofmann and appeared in 2003. The pieces in the book "record the violent social and political paroxysms that constantly threatened to undo the fragile democracy" of those years, but some of them also report on more prosaic aspects of life in Berlin in those years, such as the public parks and the rising entertainment industry.

Roth arrived in Berlin in 1920. It became his main base for his journalistic and literary activities until 1933, when Hitler's seizure of power led him to leave Germany for France.

"Roth, like no other German writer of his time, ventured beyond Berlin's official veneer to the heart of the city, chronicling the lives of its forgotten inhabitants – the war cripples, the Jewish immigrants, the criminals, the bathhouse denizens. Warning early on of the threat posed by the Nazis, Roth evoked a landscape of moral bankruptcy and debauched beauty, a memorable portrait of a city at a critical moment in history."

The volume is divided into nine sections: What I Saw, The Jewish Quarter, Displaced Persons, Traffic, Berlin Under Construction, Bourgeoisie and Bohemians, Berlin's Pleasure Industry, An Apolitical Observer Goes to the Reichstag, and Look Back in Anger.

== Critical reception ==
Writing of the work (as translated into English by Michael Hoffman), the critic Paul Bailey said the book "conjures up a city very like the one in Fritz Lang's masterpiece M – a city of lost souls; of thieves, pimps and beggars, of constant, hooting traffic and menacing, overlarge buildings." He called the collection, "a marvellous book ... It offers proof that Roth is as brilliant and original a journalist as he is a storyteller, casting his eye and cocking his ear where lesser writers never venture. ... what a rich legacy of the humane imagination he has left us".
