= Erich Zeisl =

Austrian-born American composer (1905–1959)

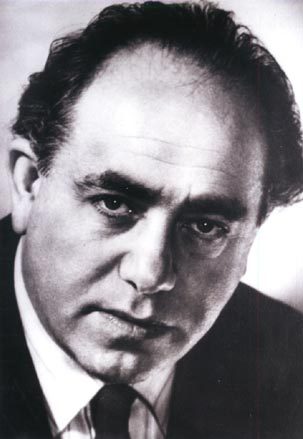
Erich Zeisl

Erich Zeisl, sometimes given as Eric Zeisel, (May 18, 1905 – February 18, 1959) was an Austrian-born American composer.

== Life and music ==
Born to a middle class Jewish family in Vienna, then capital of the Austro-Hungarian empire, Zeisl was the son of Kamilla (Feitler) and Siegmund Zeisl. His musical precocity enabled him to gain a place at the Vienna State Academy (against the wishes of his family) when he was 14, at which age his first song was published. While there, he studied with Richard Stöhr, Joseph Marx and Hugo Kauder. He won a state prize for a setting of the Requiem mass in 1934, but his Jewish background made it difficult to obtain work and publication. After the Anschluss in 1938, he fled first to Paris, where he began work on an opera based on Joseph Roth's Job, and then to New York City.

Eventually he went to Hollywood, where he worked on film music but increasingly felt isolated and ill at ease with the production-line demands of his employers. Among the films for which he wrote music were The Postman Always Rings Twice (1946), and Abbott and Costello Meet the Invisible Man (1951).

Zeisl's style was essentially tonal, and conservative compared to contemporaries such as Arnold Schoenberg, and thus not totally unsuited to film music composition. But his heart lay elsewhere. At one stage he was employed to arrange the music for a highly inaccurate stage show about the life of Tchaikovsky, Song without Words. His anguish about his reduction to such work (together with the straits to which other émigré composers in America were reduced at the time) is evident in a letter written to a friend in 1945:

Even Milhaud, Stravinsky, Tansman are struggling. Béla Bartók died in New York of hunger! ... Last year I orchestrated a Tchaikowsky operetta which provided [a] living for 8 months, but why does Tchaikowsky have to be put into an operetta? ... No composer is important here.

Nonetheless, Zeisl was able eventually to find academic appointments and time to compose in his own style. These works included a variety of chamber music, a piano concerto, a cello concerto (written for Gregor Piatigorsky), and a setting for choir, soloists, and orchestra of Psalm 92 in Hebrew, which he titled Requiem Ebraico (Hebrew Requiem), written in 1944–45 in memory of his father. A work of variations for orchestra was based on the Christmas carol "It Came Upon the Midnight Clear." His opera Hiob (Job) was never completed.

Zeisl was married to Gertrud Susanne (Jellinek). His daughter Barbara Zeisl Schoenberg married Ronald Schoenberg, the son of the composer Arnold Schoenberg. His grandson is lawyer E. Randol Schoenberg. Zeisl died of a heart attack while teaching in Los Angeles.

Zeisl's music was banned as degenerate music under the Nazi regime, which has been one element in a revival of interest in his music, some of which is now available on CD. The premiere performance of the Requiem Ebraico was held in Los Angeles in the Hollywood First Methodist Church on April 8, 1945, by Hugo Strelitzer conducting the Fairfax Temple Choir.

== Selected works ==
Ballets

- Pierrot in der Flasche (1929; after Gustav Meyrink's Der Mann auf der Flasche; only a five-movement orchestral suite was performed in 1935)
- Uranium 235
- Naboth's Vinyard
- Jacob und Rachel

Choral

- Afrika singt
- Requiem Concertante
- Requiem Ebraico

Operas

- Leonce und Lena
- Hiob (unfinished)

Chamber

- Sonata for cello and piano (1950)
- Piano trio suite Op. 8 (1923–24)
- Second string quartet (1953)
- "Arrowhead" trio for flute, viola and harp (1956)

Songs

- "Liebeslied"
- "Mondbilder" (text by Christian Morgenstern)
- "Harlemer Nachtlied" for soprano, tenor and choir

Orchestral

- Scherzo und Fuge für Streichorchester
- Passacaglia-Fantasie für Orchester
- Kleine Symphonie
- Piano Concerto (1951/1952, first performed 2005 with Daniel Glover, piano and Jason Klein conducting the Saratoga Symphony)
- Variations based on "It Came Upon the Midnight Clear" for orchestra
