= Caterino Mazzolà =

Italian poet and librettist

Caterino Tommaso Mazzolà (18 January 1745 at Longarone – 16 July 1806 in Venice) was an Italian poet and librettist. Born into a wealthy family from the islands of Murano, he and his family moved to Venice around 1767, but after a few years he moved to Treviso. He married in 1780 and, having already met Giacomo Casanova and Lorenzo Da Ponte, started work as a librettist.

After 1780, Joseph Schuster helped Mazzolà to be appointed as Dresden's court poet; he held the post until 1796. During this period, he worked with Da Ponte and met Antonio Salieri, who suggested that Mazzolà could write the libretto for an opera buffa entitled La scuola de' gelosi which premiered in 1778. In 1783, the opera appeared in Vienna. Mazzolà's libretto L'isola capricciosa, first set to music by Giacomo Rust and performed in Venice in 1780, was later set to music by Salieri and performed under the title Il mondo alla rovescia (Venice, 1795). This libretto contains a scena (recitative and aria) that Mozart set to music as one of his finest concert arias ("Misero! O sogno," K. 431).

Early in 1791, Mazzolà briefly became the Viennese court poet through Da Ponte and Salieri. Later that year, he significantly revised Metastasio's text for Mozart's new setting of La clemenza di Tito (originally created in 1734, to music by Antonio Caldara). Da Ponte and Salieri had suggested that Mazzolà would be a suitable poet for Count Rosenberg, the court theatre director. However, Giovanni Bertati replaced Rosenberg, and Mazzolà retreated to Dresden. In 1796, he returned to Venice, but Friedrich August III of Dresden helped Mazzolà to engage in diplomatic work, and requested that some of his writings should be sent back to the Saxon court each year.

Mazzolà's librettos are mostly opere buffe and set by the Dresden composers Johann Gottlieb Naumann, Joseph Schuster and Franz Seydelmann. Seydelmann's best Italian opera was Il turco in Italia (1788), described by Constanze Mozart after a performance in Vienna in 1789. Mazzolà's libretto was reworked by Felice Romani for Rossini's Il turco in Italia, which premiered in 1814.
