= Zeisls Hiob =

Zeisls Hiob (English: Zeisl's Job) is a completion by Jan Duszyński and Miron Hakenbeck of the unfinished opera Hiob commenced by Erich Zeisl in 1939. It was premiered by the Bavarian State Opera in 2014.

== Background ==
The opera is based on Joseph Roth's novel, Job – The Story of a Simple Man, itself inspired by the biblical book of Job. In July 1939, a dramatization of the novel was arranged in Paris in honour of Roth (who had died in May 1939) and Zeisl, who had recently arrived in Paris in flight from Nazi Germany, wrote some incidental music for this production. This inspired him to create a complete opera based on Roth's work, for which he persuaded his friend Hans Kafka (1902–1974) to write a libretto. Zeisl composed the first act by 1940, by which time he was now living in New York. Kafka was not able to produce the libretto for Act II until 1957. Zeisl completed the composition of this, but died in 1959.

Interest in the composer following the 50th anniversary of his death led to 2009 and 2010 student performances of excerpts from the opera in Rostock and Vienna. In 2013 the Bavarian State Opera decided to commission a completion of the opera by the Polish composer Jan Duszyński and the librettist Miron Hakenbeck. This version was premièred in Munich under the title Zeisls Hiob on 19 July 2014.

== Roles ==
The information in this section is taken from the Bavarian State Opera castlist.

Role	Voice type	Première cast, 19 July 2014
Mendel	tenor	Chris Merritt
Deborah		Christa Ratzenböck
Mirjam	soprano	Mária Celeng
Jonas		Patrick Vogel
Schemaria		Wiard Witholt
Menuchim	tenor	Matthew Grills
Michael/Mike	tenor	Joshua Stewart
Kapturak		Peter Lobert
Wonder Rabbi/Kosak		Rafal Pawnuk
Sameskin		Leonard Bernad

== Synopsis ==
Act I takes place in Russia before World War I. Mendel Singer teaches Jewish children in a shtetl. His four children bring him problems; the youngest, Menuchim, is disabled. His daughter Mirjam has affairs with cossack soldiers, and his other two sons are liable for conscription into the Russian Army. His son Schemaria escapes conscription by fleeing to the United States, and Mendel decides to follow him with his own family; but he is forced to leave Menuchim behind.

Act II takes place in America. The war has broken out and Mendel has lost touch with Menuchim and with his other son, Jonas, who has joined the Russian army. Mirjam has a nervous breakdown, Mendel is oppressed by guilt about Menuchim, and Mendel's wife Deborah reproaches him for their sad condition. However, during the Passover seder meal, at the point where traditionally the prophet Elijah is anticipated, Menuchim enters. He has discovered music, and this has cured him – he is now a composer.

== Sources ==
Notes

Sources

- Bayerische Staatsoper (2014a). "Zeisls Hiob: Synopsis" on Bayerische Staatsoper (Bavarian State Opera) website, accessed 1 February 2015. (In German).
- Bayerische Staatsoper (2014b). "Cast list: Zeisls Hiob" on Bayerische Staatsoper (Bavarian State Opera) website, accessed 1 February 2015. (In German).
- Cole, Malcolm S. (2014). A Miracle in Munich: The Bavarian State Opera Premieres Zeisls Hiob. Orel Foundation website, accessed 1 February 2015.
