= George Salter =

American book cover designer

George Salter (5 October 1897 – 31 October 1967), born Georg Salter, was an originally German, and from 1940 onwards an American book cover designer. He revolutionized cover design for books. He claimed worldwide fame for his design for Alfred Döblins Berlin Alexanderplatz.

== Life ==
Georg Salter was born in Bremen, the child of a Hamburg musician. In the year of his birth, his parents converted from Judaism to Christian faith. With his parents and three siblings he moved to Berlin. After finishing school and serving in the military, he studied in the art craft school in Berlin. 1921, he began work as set designer. Starting in 1927, he started working as designer for the publisher Die Schmiede.

Salter taught at the Municipal Art School in Berlin in the early 1930s, where he taught designer Hans Barschel. In November 1934 Salter emigrated to the US and started living in New York, where he immediately began to design book jackets for US publishers. He became an American citizen in 1940.

Salter was married to Agnes O'Shea and had one daughter, Janet. He died in New York City on October 31, 1967.

== Literature ==
- Thomas S. Hansen: Classic Book Jackets. The Design Legacy of George Salter. Princeton Architectural Press, New York: 2005
