= The Trial =

1925 novel by Franz Kafka

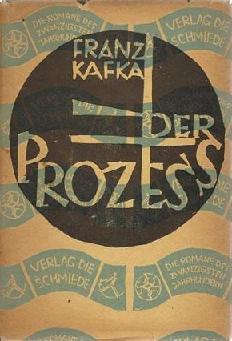
- First edition dust jacket (1925)
- Author: Franz Kafka
- Original title: Der Prozess
- Language: German
- Genre: Philosophical fiction; Dystopian fiction; Absurdist fiction; Paranoid fiction; Black comedy
- Set in: A city in Central Europe
- Publisher: Verlag Die Schmiede, Berlin
- Publication date: 26 April 1925
- Media type: Print: hardback
- Dewey Decimal: 833.912
- LC Class: PT2621.A26 P713
- Original text: Der Prozess at German Wikisource
- Website: www.franzkafka.de/werk/der-process

The Trial (German: Der Prozess) (Note: Also Der Proceß, Der Prozeß and Der Process. Kafka used the spelling Process; Max Brod and later publishers changed it. See Faksimile Edition.) is a German-language novel written by the Czech-Jewish writer Franz Kafka in 1914 and 1915 and published posthumously on 26 April 1925. One of his best-known works, it tells the story of Josef K., a bank official arrested and prosecuted by an inaccessible authority, with the nature of the crime of which he is accused revealed neither to him nor to the reader. The novel shows K. as he tries to navigate through an absurdly bureaucratic legal system as well as his social alienation as he attempts to clear his name. Some similarities between The Trial and Dostoevsky's Crime and Punishment and The Brothers Karamazov suggest their possible influence on it, and Kafka went so far as to call Dostoevsky a blood relative. Like Kafka's two other novels, The Castle and Amerika, The Trial was never completed, although it does include a chapter that appears to bring the story to an intentionally abrupt ending.

After Kafka's death in 1924, his friend and literary executor Max Brod edited the text for publication by Verlag Die Schmiede. The original manuscript is held at the Museum of Modern Literature, Marbach am Neckar, Germany. The first English-language translation, by Willa and Edwin Muir, was published in 1937. In 1999, the book was listed in Le Monde's 100 Books of the Century and as No. 2 of the Best German Novels of the Twentieth Century.

== Development ==
Kafka drafted the opening sentence of The Trial (Note: Paul Reitter (Summer 2025) provides what he calls "a basic, straightforward translation" of the opening sentence: "Someone must have slandered Josef K., for without having done anything wrong, he was arrested one morning.") in August 1914 and worked on the novel throughout 1915. This was an unusually productive period for Kafka, despite the outbreak of World War I, which significantly increased the pressures of his day job as an insurance agent.

Having begun by writing the opening and concluding sections of the novel, Kafka worked on the intervening scenes in a haphazard manner, using several different notebooks simultaneously. His friend Max Brod, knowing Kafka's habit of destroying his own work, eventually took the manuscript for safekeeping. It consisted of 161 loose pages torn from notebooks, which Kafka had bundled together into chapters. The order of the chapters was not made clear to Brod; nor was he told which parts were complete and which were unfinished. Following Kafka's death in 1924, Brod edited the work and assembled it into a novel to the best of his ability. Further editorial work has been done by later scholars, but Kafka's final vision for The Trial remains unknown.

== Plot summary ==
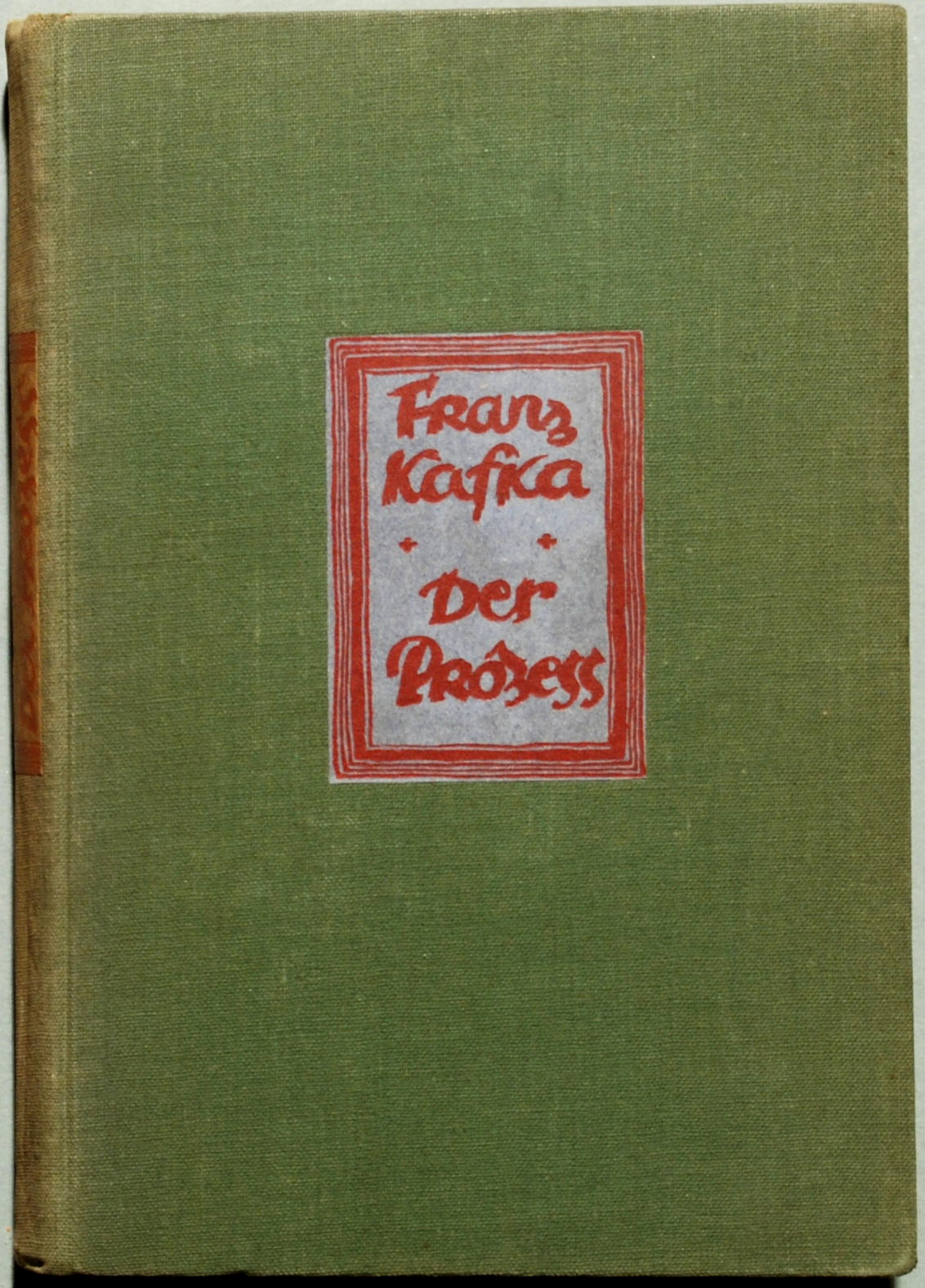
Cover, 1925

On the morning of his thirtieth birthday, Josef K., the chief clerk of a bank, is unexpectedly arrested by two agents from an unidentified agency for an unspecified crime. (Note: Paul Reitter (Summer 2025) compares published translations of the opening sentence of The Trial. Reitter states that, in the original German, Josef K. may have done something wrong or may not have. But the German being untranslatable, the Muirs write that Josef K. had done nothing wrong, and Breon Mitchell writes that he did nothing "truly wrong", neither of which is accurate. In the preface to his translation, Mitchell acknowledges the lack of "totally satisfying solutions to the difficulties presented by Kafka's opening sentence" and defends his choice of "truly wrong" as having "a double purpose: to push the word 'wrong' toward the province of the criminally malicious and to introduce ... the question of truth". Kafka, Franz (1998). The Trial, translated by Breon Mitchell. New York: Schocken Books, p. xix.) The agents discuss the situation with K. in the unoccupied room of his fellow lodger Fräulein Bürstner, in the unexplained presence of three junior clerks from K.'s bank. K. is not imprisoned, but left free to go about his business. His landlady, Frau Grubach, tries to console K. about the trial. He visits Bürstner to explain the events, but gradually ignores her and begins to admire her physical appearance. As he leaves, he grabs her and then harasses her by kissing her without consent.

K. finds that Fräulein Montag, a lodger from another room, has moved in with Fräulein Bürstner. He suspects that this is a coy manoeuvre meant to distance him from Bürstner, and resolves that she will eventually fall for his charms.

K. is summoned to appear at the court's address the coming Sunday, without being told the time or location. After a period of exploration he finds the court in the attic of a dilapidated working-class tenement block, at the back of a young washerwoman's home. K. is rebuked for his lateness and mistaken for a house painter rather than a bank clerk. He arouses the assembly's hostility after a passionate plea about the absurdity of the trial and the falseness of the accusation, despite still not knowing the charges. The proceedings are interrupted by a man sexually assaulting the washerwoman in a corner. K. notices that all the assembly members are wearing pins on their lapels which he interprets as signifying their membership of a secret organisation.

The following Sunday K. goes to the courtroom again, but the court is not in session. The washerwoman gives him information about the process and attempts to seduce him before a law student, the man who assaulted her the previous week, takes her away, claiming her to be his mistress. The woman's husband, a court usher, then takes K. on a tour of the court offices, which ends after K. becomes extremely weak in the presence of other court officials and defendants.

One evening, in a storage room at his own bank, K. discovers the two agents who arrested him being whipped for soliciting bribes from K., which he had complained about at court. K. tries to argue with the flogger, saying that the men need not be whipped, but the flogger cannot be swayed. The next day he returns to the storage room and is shocked to find everything as he had found it the day before, including the flogger and the two agents.

K. is visited by his uncle Karl, who lives in the country. Worried by the rumors about his nephew, Karl introduces K. to Herr Huld, a sickly and bedridden lawyer tended to by Leni, a young woman who shows an immediate attraction to K. During a conversation between Karl and Huld about K.'s case, Leni calls K. away for a sexual encounter. Afterwards, K. meets his angry uncle outside, who claims that K.'s lack of respect for the advocate, by leaving the meeting and romantically engaging with the woman who is apparently Huld's mistress, has hurt his case.

K. has become increasingly preoccupied by his case, to the detriment of his work. He has further meetings with Huld, and continues to engage in discreet trysts with Leni, but the advocate's work appears to be having no effect on the proceedings. At the bank, one of K.'s clients recommends he seek the advice of Titorelli, the court's official painter. Titorelli outlines the options he can help K. pursue: indefinite postponement of the process, or a temporary acquittal that could at any point result in re-arrest. Unequivocal acquittal is not a viable option.

Suspicious of the advocate's motives and the apparent lack of progress, K. finally decides to dismiss Huld and take control of matters himself. Upon arriving at Huld's office, he meets a downtrodden merchant, Rudi Block, who offers K. some insight from a fellow defendant's perspective. Block's case has continued for five years and he has gone from being a successful businessman to being almost bankrupt and is virtually enslaved by his dependence on the lawyer and Leni, with whom he appears to be sexually involved. The lawyer mocks Block in front of K. for his dog-like subservience. This experience further poisons K.'s opinion of his lawyer.

K. is put in charge of accompanying an important Italian client to the city's cathedral, but the client never meets him there. Inside the cathedral, a priest calls K. by name and tells him a fable about a man who seeks the law but dies awaiting admission by a dutiful doorkeeper. The priest tells K. that the parable is an ancient text of the court, and many generations of court officials have interpreted it differently.

On the eve of K.'s thirty-first birthday, two men arrive at his apartment. The three walk through the city, and K. catches a brief glimpse of Fräulein Bürstner. They arrive at a small quarry outside the city, and the men kill K., stabbing him in the heart with a butcher's knife while strangling him. K. summarizes his situation with his last words: "Like a dog!".

== English translations ==
- Victor Gollancz Ltd, 1937, Translation: Willa and Edwin Muir. Also published in 1992 by Everyman's Library, ISBN 978-0-679-40994-6
- Pan Books, 1987, Translation: Douglas Scott and Chris Waller, ISBN 0-330-24468-X
- Penguin Books, 1994, Translation: Idris Parry
- Schocken Books, 1998, Translation: Breon Mitchell, ISBN 0-8052-4165-5. Translator's preface is available online.
- Hesperus Press Limited, 2005, Translation: Richard Stokes, ISBN 1-84391-401-8
- Dover Thrift Editions, 22 July 2009, Translation: David Wyllie (2003), ISBN 978-0-486-47061-0
- Oxford World's Classics, 4 October 2009, Translation: Mike Mitchell, ISBN 978-0-19-923829-3
- Vitalis-Verlag, 15 September 2012, Translation: Susanne Lück and Maureen Fitzgibbons, ISBN 978-80-7253-298-8

== Adaptations ==
=== Stage ===
- The writer and director Steven Berkoff adapted several of Kafka's novels into plays and directed them for stage. His version of The Trial was first performed in 1970 in London and published in 1981.
- Israeli director Rina Yerushalmi adapted The Trial (paired with Samuel Beckett's Malone Dies) for a production called Ta, Ta, Tatata presented in June 1970 at La MaMa Experimental Theatre Club.
- Chicago-based writer Greg Allen wrote and directed K., based on The Trial. After award-winning runs in Chicago and New York, it was produced by The Hypocrites and ran for several months in 2010 at The Chopin Theater in Chicago.
- Joseph K, written by Tom Basden and based on The Trial, takes place in modern-day London, with the protagonist cast as a city banker. It ran at the Gate Theatre, Notting Hill, London, in late 2010.
- Gottfried von Einem wrote an opera, Der Prozeß, based on the novel. Its American debut was directed by Otto Preminger.
- The writer Serge Lamothe adapted The Trial for the stage. Directed by François Girard, his version of The Trial was first performed in 2004 in Montreal and Ottawa, Canada, and published in 2005.
- Between June and August 2015, The Young Vic theatre in London staged a version of The Trial adapted by Nick Gill and starring Rory Kinnear as K.
- Jean-Louis Barrault and Andre Gide adapted the novel for the stage, performed in Paris in 1947.
- An opera based on The Trial by Philip Glass was premiered by Music Theatre Wales in October 2014.
- K., a "Talmudic vaudeville" adaptation by Barrie Kosky based on The Trial premiered in September 2025, performed by the Berliner Ensemble.

=== Radio ===
- On 19 May 1946, Columbia Workshop broadcast an adaptation of The Trial by Davidson Taylor with an original musical score by Bernard Herrmann and starring Karl Swenson as Joseph K.
- In 1982, Mike Gwilym starred as Josef K. with Miriam Margolyes as Leni in an adaptation on BBC Radio 4 dramatised for radio by Hanif Kureishi.
- Sam Troughton starred as Joseph Kay in a new adaptation by Mark Ravenhill titled The Process directed by Polly Thomas and broadcast on 10 May 2015 on BBC Radio 3's Drama on 3 program.

=== Film ===
- In the 1962 film adaptation by Orson Welles, Josef K. is played by Anthony Perkins and the advocate by Welles.
- The 1993 film The Trial was based on Harold Pinter's screenplay adaptation. Directed by David Jones, it starred Kyle MacLachlan as Josef K. and Anthony Hopkins as The Priest.

=== Graphic novel ===
- A graphic novel adaptation by Chantal Montellier (illustrations) and David Zane Mairowitz (adaptation) appeared on April 15, 2008.

== See also ==
- Please Hold – 2020 short film by K.D. Dávila
- "The Pedestrian" – 1951 short story by Ray Bradbury
