= Hotel Savoy (novel) =

1924 novel by Joseph Roth

- 1986 edition
- Author: Joseph Roth
- Translator: John Hoare
- Language: German
- Publisher: Frankfurter Zeitung; Verlag Die Schmiede
- Publication date: 9 February 1924
- Publication place: Germany
- English publication date: 1986
- Pages: 145

Hotel Savoy is a 1924 novel by the Austrian writer Joseph Roth. Its story is set in the Hotel Savoy in Łódź, where lonely war veterans, variety dancers and others dream of better places.

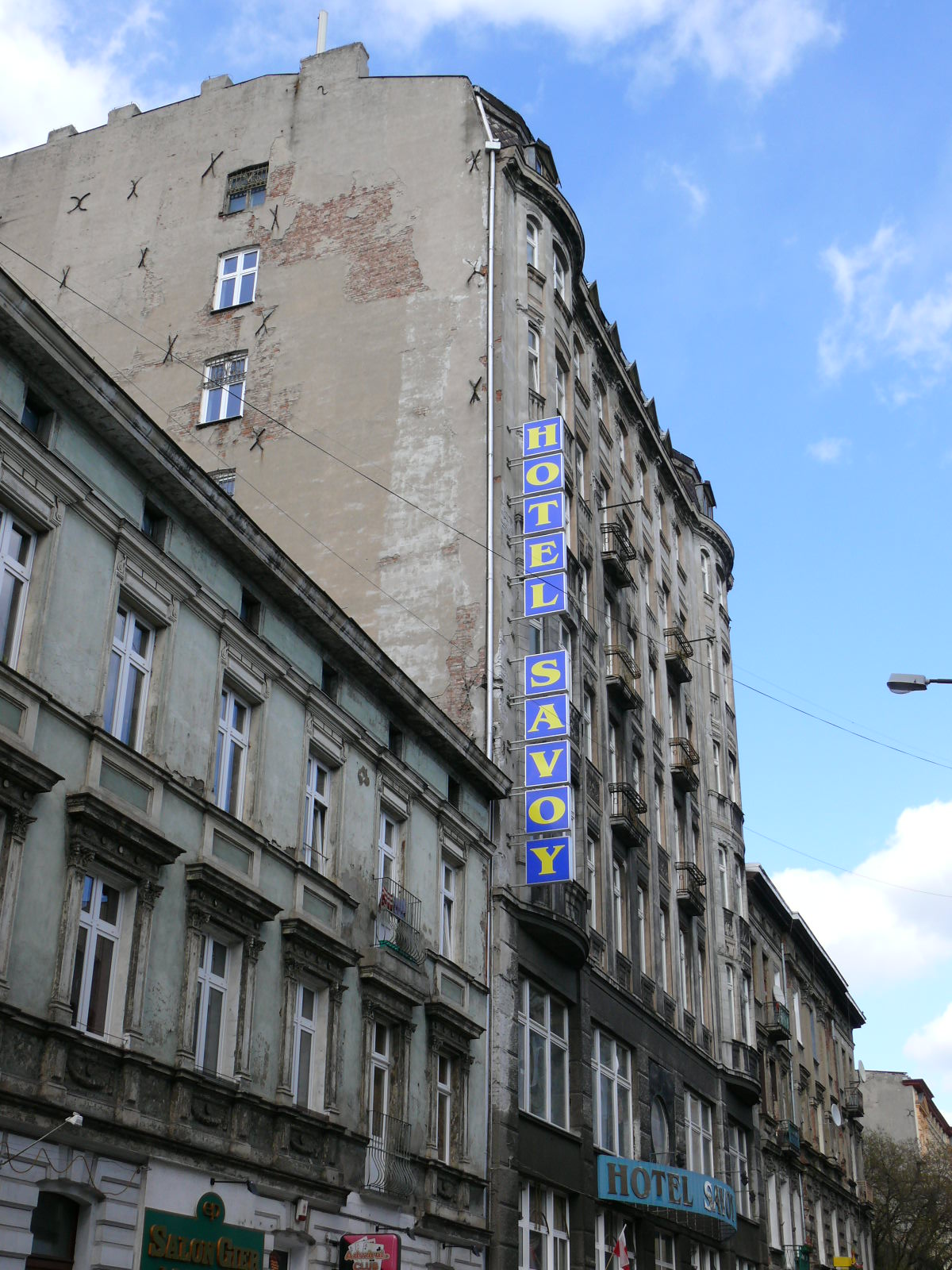
Hotel Savoy in Łódź in 2007; it has since been renovated

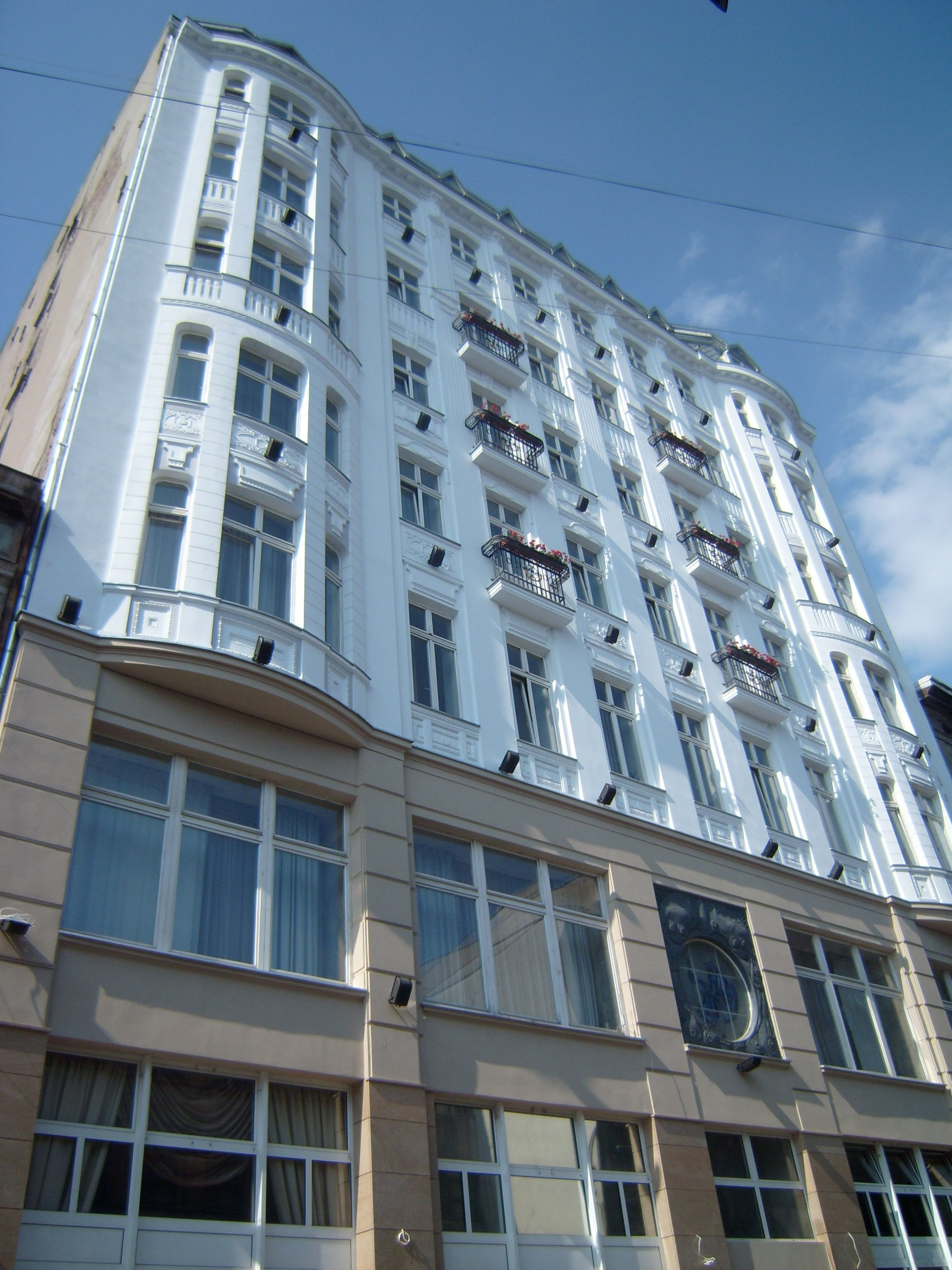
Hotel Savoy after restoration

== Publication ==
The novel was serialised in the Frankfurter Zeitung between 9 February and 16 March 1924. It was published in book form in Germany by Verlag Die Schmiede later the same year. An English translation by John Hoare was published by The Overlook Press in 1986.

== Reception ==
Herbert Gold reviewed the book for The New York Times in 1987: "Like the ceiling of the hotel room, the narration is transparent, revealing a hallucinatory loneliness, a presence out of time, a soul floating in Middle and Eastern Europe. None of this is mere cafe surrealism or angst; one of Roth's achievements is to give a sense of strict accuracy; his story is a laconic scenario, with characters offered like facts." Gold continued: "Roth's swift style makes things happen naturally; we see, hear, smell and believe. A joyous storyteller's gift remains precariously alive within the pessimism of decay and loss. Although the teller of the tale says 'there is no end there, no break - always continuity and connection,' his art is kind and draws us to a satisfying conclusion after the luridness of events."

== See also ==
- 1924 in literature
- Austrian literature
