= Job (novel) =

Novel by Joseph Roth

- Title page for Job: The Story of a Simple Man (1931)
- Author: Joseph Roth
- Translator: Dorothy Thompson
- Language: German
- Publisher: Gustav Kiepenheuer Verlag
- Publication date: 1930
- Publication place: Germany
- English publication date: 1931
- Pages: 299

Job (German: Hiob) is a 1930 novel by the Austrian writer Joseph Roth. It has the subtitle "The Story of a Simple Man" ("Roman eines einfachen Mannes"). It tells the story of an orthodox Jew whose faith is weakened when he moves from Tsarist Russia to New York City. The story is based on the Book of Job.

== Reception ==
When the English translation of the book was reviewed in The New York Times in 1931, the reviewer compared it to the author's previous works:

Roth's development as a novelist has shown a gradual abandonment of problem and political themes such as filled Rechts und Links. Flucht Ohne Ende (Flight Without End) contains evidence of a growing inner life[.] ... Im [sic] Job, finally, he seems to admit that literature must follow upon, not lead, social change; and consequently he has turned his eyes inward upon his spiritual self, and backward upon tradition. He has written a work of the type that literary chroniclers like to call pure.

The critic wrote about the book's relation to its source material:

It is the old, familiar book of Job, reworked in modern symbols. As with other great legends, the drama is weakened by modernization, but the lyrical quality of the prose and the innate wisdom of the author help us to forget that.

The review ended: "there seldom has appeared a book in which each word is burdened so heavily with music and meaning. For its tenderness and beauty alone, Job deserves a wide audience."

Harriet Porter of The Guardian reviewed the book in 2000: "Roth captures essential truths about faith, hope and despair within his reworking of a Biblical story. His writing is rich without being dense, and has a fable-like directness."

The composer Erich Zeisl began work on an opera based on the novel. It was completed by the Polish composer Jan Duszynski and produced as Zeisls Hiob in Munich in 2014.

== See also ==
- 1930 in literature
- Austrian literature
