= Radetzky March =

1848 march by Johann Strauss Sr.

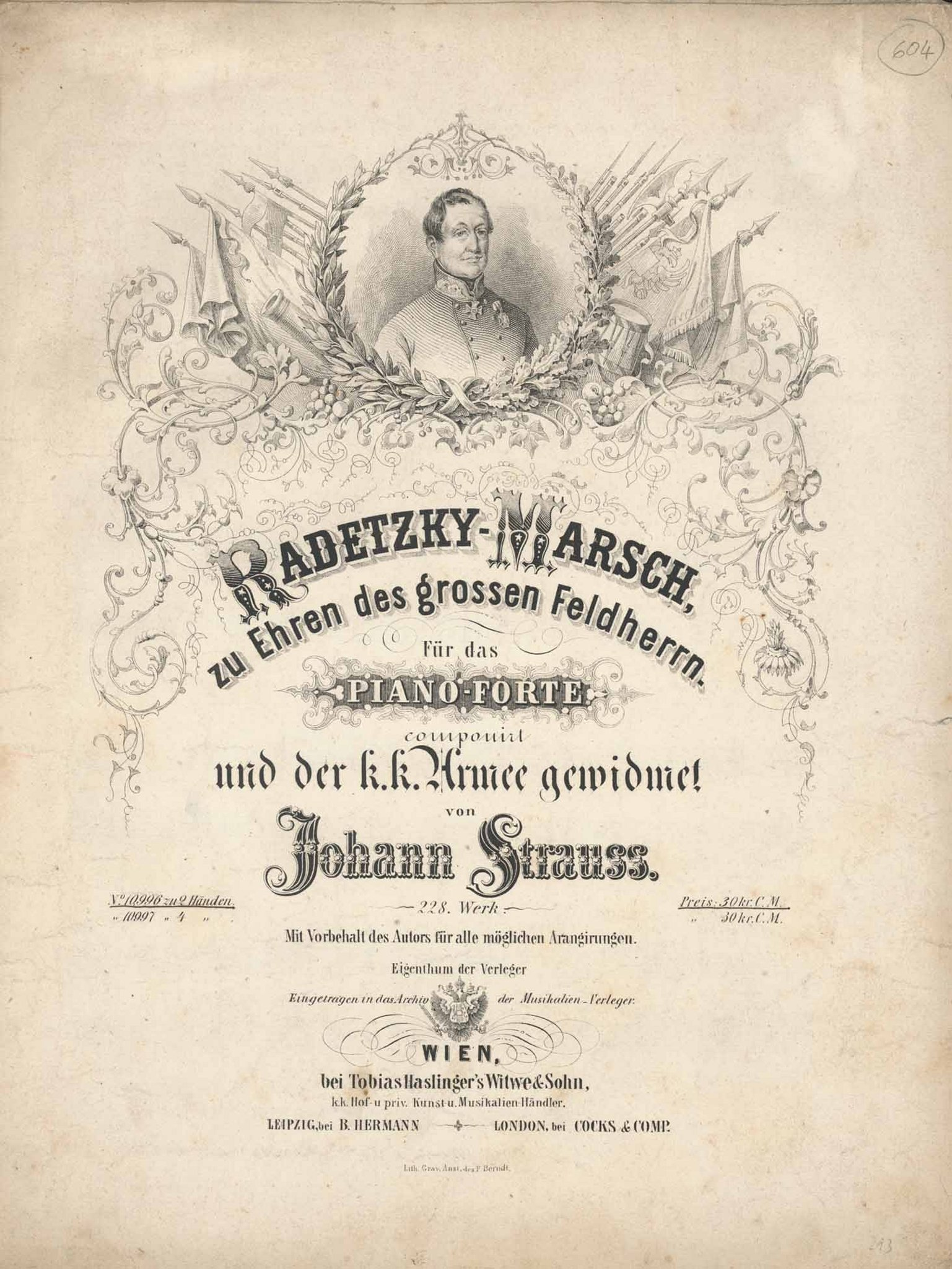
"Radetzky March" by Johann Strauss (Senior), cover sheet, 1848

"Radetzky March"
Johann Strauss (Senior)'s "Radetzky March" arranged for the United States Marine Band

The "Radetzky March", Op. 228, (German: Radetzkymarsch; pronounced [ʁaˈdɛtskiˌmaʁʃ]) is a march composed by Johann Strauss Sr. which was first performed on 31 August 1848 in Vienna to celebrate the victory of the Austrian Empire under Field Marshal Joseph Radetzky von Radetz (the piece's namesake) over the Italian forces at the Battle of Custoza, during the First Italian War of Independence. It has been noted that its tone is more celebratory than martial, but it nevertheless became popular among marching regimental soldiers. Today, the work is primarily associated with the Vienna Philharmonic as an encore to their New Year's Concert.

== Origin ==
Strauss had already used the theme in his Jubel-Quadrille, Op. 130.

For the trio, Strauss used an older folk melody called Alter Tanz aus Wien or Tinerl-Lied which was originally in 3/4 time. When Radetzky came back to Vienna after winning the Battle of Custoza (1848), his soldiers were singing the then-popular song. Allegedly Strauss heard this singing and incorporated the melody, converted to 2/4 time, into the "Radetzky March".

== Reception ==
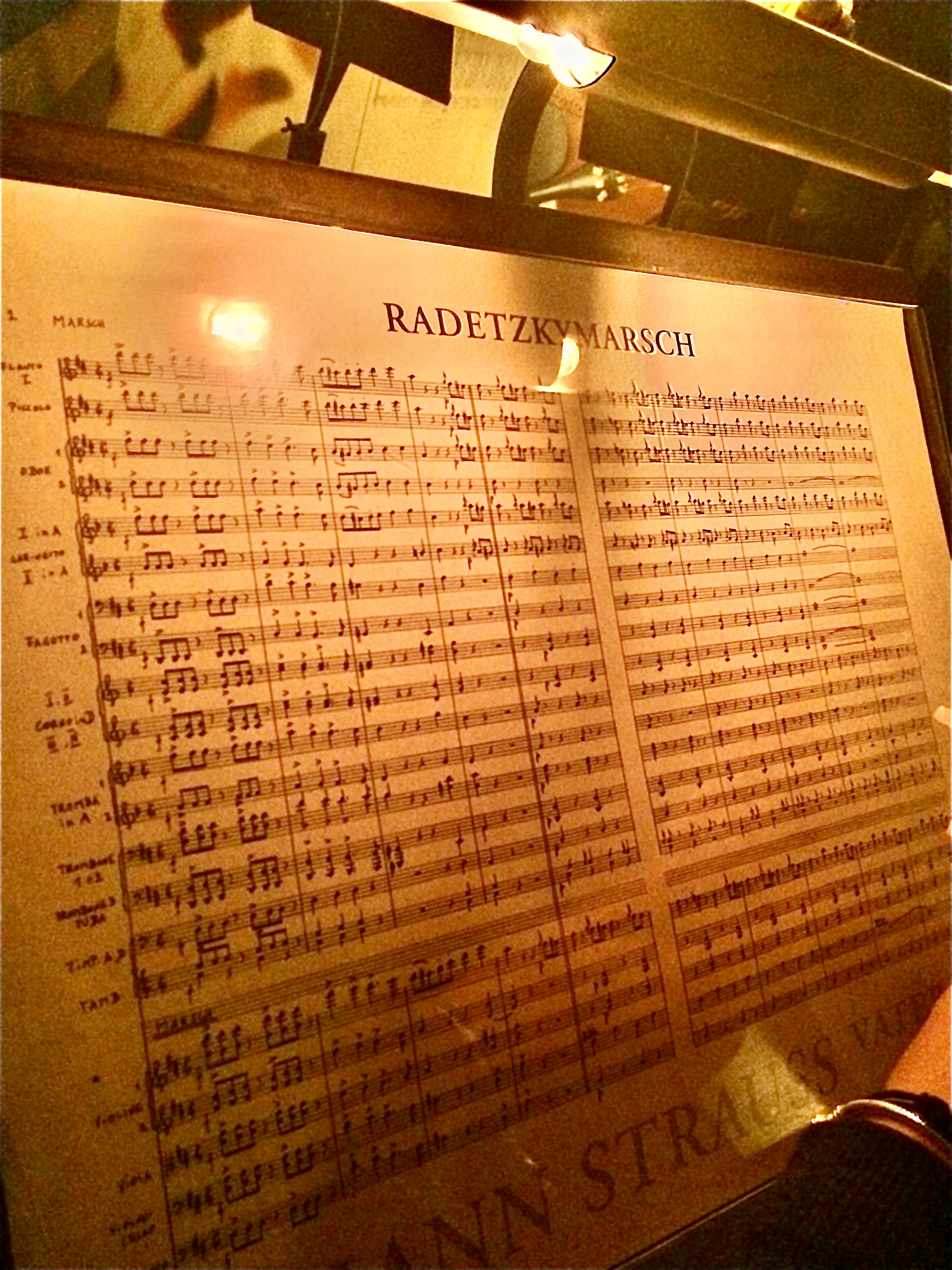
"Radetzky March"'s musical notes in Vienna, Austria

Vienna was central to the revolutions of 1848 in the Austrian Empire and appointed prime ministers were reserved about the future course of action. In May 1848 the minister of war Count Baillet von Latour endorsed military action without consulting Franz Joseph I of Austria. Joseph Radetzky von Radetz engaged and defeated Charles Albert of Sardinia in June and July 1848. These victories of the Imperial Austrian army were celebrated in Vienna to the tune of the Radetzky March. Along with "The Blue Danube" waltz by Johann Strauss Jr., the piece became an unofficial Austrian national anthem.

When it was first played in front of Austrian officers, they spontaneously clapped and stamped their feet when they heard the chorus. This tradition, with quiet rhythmic clapping on the first iteration of the melody, followed by thunderous clapping on the second, is often observed when the march is played in classical music venues in an orchestral version prepared by Leopold Weninger (1879–1940).

== Legacy ==
In 1932 Joseph Roth published his novel Radetzky March, chronicling the decline and fall of the Austro-Hungarian Empire. Today, the theme is used in numerous promotional jingles and at major sporting events, in particular at football matches of the Austria national team. Since 1896, the "Radetzky March" has been the official presentation march of the Chilean Army's Liberator Bernardo O'Higgins Military School and the Paraguayan Army's Marshall Francisco Solano López Military Academy. The 1st The Queen's Dragoon Guards of the United Kingdom adopted the "Radetzky March" as its regimental quick march.

Since it was first introduced in 1946 by conductor Josef Krips during the New Year's Concert (Neujahrskonzert) of the Vienna Philharmonic it is always played as a jubilant encore. It was announced in 2019 by the Vienna Philharmonic board of directors that a new version would be used that would replace the Weninger arrangement in an attempt to "de-Nazify" the march. The new arrangement was first performed at the New Year's Concert in 2020.

== Piece parts ==
The "Radetzky March" consists of several main parts:

- The introduction: the whole orchestra plays and the brass section carries the melody.
- The first figure: played by the string section.
- At figure two: the whole orchestra plays until figure three, when it repeats back to the D.S. (first figure).
- The trio: played by the brass section, with the trumpet playing three sixteenth notes in the last bars.
- Figure five: the whole orchestra plays.
- Figure six: the whole orchestra plays and then repeats back to figure five.
- The orchestra plays until the last bar, then returns to the D.C. (beginning).
- The orchestra plays until figure three, finishing with the Fine ("end") bar— the direction is Da capo al fine (repeat from beginning up to the word Fine).

== In movies and television productions ==
- Sissi (1955): Heard during Franz-Joseph's engagement to Sissi.
- The Sea Chase (1955): As the Ergenstrasse reaches Valparaiso.
- The Good Soldier Schweik (1956): Heard several times.
- The Stolen Airship (1966): Heard several times (every time an army appears)
- The Prisoner (1967–1968): Played by the Village brass band.
- Sirkuspelle Hermanni (1978-1988): Main theme.
- Colonel Redl (1985)
- Mr. Bean (1990): Heard over the loudspeakers at school.
- La Marche de Radetzky [fr] (1994): This historical drama taken from the eponymous novel by Joseph Roth (1894–1939), depicts the disintegration of the Austro-Hungarian Empire in the decade preceding 1914 through the dismay of the young lieutenant von Trotta. This description is punctuated by cheerful notes and mocking the musical leitmotif: the Radetzky March.
- Battle Royale (2000)
- Chiro and Friends (2007): The song was used as the melody for the closing theme for the show.
- Star Blazers: Space Battleship Yamato 2199 (2013): In the fourth season of the show "Space Battleship Yamato: 3199: REBEL", the song can be heard in the third episode during a space battle. It is assumed the music is actually being played inside the ship as a character can be seen tapping his foot to the rhythm.
- Svatojánský věneček [cz] (2015): In this Czech fairytale, one of the princess' suitors invents a special cartridge that serves as a musical instrument and can play the Radetzky march.
- DějePIC! (2017): Czech children's comedy show about famous Czech personalities. One episode is dedicated to Marshal Radetz.
- The Power of the Dog (2021): The piano piece that Rose practices and fails to perform is a version of the Radetzky March.
- El Conde (2023): Opening credits of the film; a political satire about Augusto Pinochet.
- Quezon (2025): Movie about the political rise of Manuel L. Quezon, culminating in his 1935 victory in the Philippine presidential election. The march is played during a part of a silent film played during the movie depicting Quezon.

== Sources ==
- Jeroen H.C. Tempelman, "On the Radetzky March", Vienna Music, no. 99 (Summer 2000), pp. 12–13
