= The Legend of the Holy Drinker =

1939 novella by Joseph Roth

- Paperback edition cover
- Author: Joseph Roth
- Original title: Die Legende vom heiligen Trinker
- Translator: Michael Hofmann
- Language: German
- Publisher: Allert de Lange Verlag
- Publication date: 1939
- Publication place: Netherlands
- English publication date: 1989
- Pages: 108

The Legend of the Holy Drinker (German: Die Legende vom heiligen Trinker) is a 1939 novella by Austrian writer Joseph Roth, published posthumously by Allert de Lange Verlag in Amsterdam. It tells the story of a homeless alcoholic, Andreas, who wants to return money he has borrowed, but fails because he spends all of his money on alcohol.

== Reception ==
In a 1992 review for Publishers Weekly, the critic wrote that "the author transforms his personal tragedy into a light, sparkling modern fable", and that Michael Hofmann's "inspired translation showcases Roth's galvanizing, constantly surprising style."

== Adaptations ==
Franz Josef Wild directed a 1963 adaptation for German television. In 1988 a film adaptation with the book's title by Ermanno Olmi premiered at the Venice Film Festival, where it went on to win the top prize, the Golden Lion for best film. Olmi's version starred Rutger Hauer as Andreas.

In 2016 Winchester-based theatre company Platform 4 a created a touring production using a puppet to tell Andreas' story.

== See also ==
- 1939 in literature
- Austrian literature
