= Idris Parry =

Idris Frederick Parry (5 December 1916 – 25 January 2008) was a Welsh Germanist, writer, broadcaster, and translator.

From 1963 to 1977, he was professor of German at the University of Manchester. He had studied at the University College of North Wales in Bangor before serving in the Foreign Office in the Second World War. He returned to his alma mater to teach before he moved to Manchester to take up his professorship. He received the Order of Merit of the Federal Republic of Germany in 1981. Parry's academic interests were broad, but he drew particular focus on the works of Johann Wolfgang von Goethe, Heinrich von Kleist, Franz Kafka, Thomas Mann, Rainer Maria Rilke and Hugo von Hofmannsthal. At Manchester, he was the dissertation supervisor of W. G. Sebald and taught Stevie Davies.

== Publications ==
- Idris Parry, Animals of Silence: Essays on Art, Nature and Folk-Tale (Oxford: Oxford University Press, 1972).
- Idris Parry, Hand to Mouth and Other Essays (Manchester: Carcanet Press, 1981).
- Idris Parry, Speak Silence (Manchester: Carcanet Press, 1989).
- Franz Kafka, The Trial, trans. by Idris Parry (Harmondsworth: Penguin, 1994).
