= Rudolf Schottlaender =

German writer (1900–1988)

- Born: August 5, 1900; Berlin, German Empire
- Died: January 4, 1988 (aged 87); East Berlin, East Germany
- Occupations: German philosopher, classical philologist, translator and political publicist

Rudolf Schottlaender (August 5, 1900 in Berlin, German Empire – January 4, 1988 in East Berlin, East Germany) was a German philosopher, classical philologist, translator and political publicist of Jewish descent.

== Biography ==
Rudolf Schottlaender studied philosophy with Edmund Husserl, Martin Heidegger and Nicolai Hartmann in Freiburg im Breisgau. There, he became acquainted with Günther Stern (the later author Günther Anders) and married Stern's sister Hilde shortly afterwards (the first of three marriages). Schottlaender also studied with Karl Jaspers. Despite his active interest for phenomenology as a student, Schottlaender referred more to the stoics and to Baruch Spinoza, in whose spirit he left Judaism in 1921.

During the Weimar Republic, Schottlaender was a private scholar. With his translation of the first part of A la recherche du temps perdu, which was published by Verlag Die Schmiede under the title of Der Weg zu Swann, he was the first German translator of Marcel Proust. He survived the Nazi regime and the persecution of the Jews, hiding in Berlin.

After 1945, he taught Latin and Greek as a secondary school teacher in West Berlin. In between (1947–1949), he taught philosophy at the Dresden University of Technology (Technische Hochschule Dresden), but as a pugnacious democrat and humanist, he came into conflict with the authorities of the Soviet occupation zone. As a result, he went back to West Berlin and worked as a secondary school teacher again. There, he became the victim of a slander campaign because of his efforts concerning overcoming the Cold War and got into professional difficulties. In 1959, he was offered a chair as professor for Latin literature, with special consideration of the Greek. (He was unable to teach philosophy there because he was a non-Marxist and because of his Dresden experiences.) After the building of the Berlin Wall in August 1961, he had to move from West Berlin to East Berlin with his family in order to continue this work. He was given emeritus status in 1965.

Besides numerous philological and philosophical works, Schottlaender published brilliant translations (new translations of Sophocles which were very effective on the stage, the publication of an edition of Petrarch, among others) and fundamental discussions of questions concerning Judaism and antisemitism. In his political essays and articles, which he predominantly published in the West, he saw himself as a mediator between the systems. Because of his positions critical to East Germany, he was put under close surveillance by the Ministry for State Security (Ministerium für Staatssicherheit or Stasi). He inspired leading minds of the developing opposition in East Germany.

== Works ==
- Trotz allem ein Deutscher, autobiography, Herder-Verlag 1986
