= Radetzky March (novel) =

1932 novel by Joseph Roth

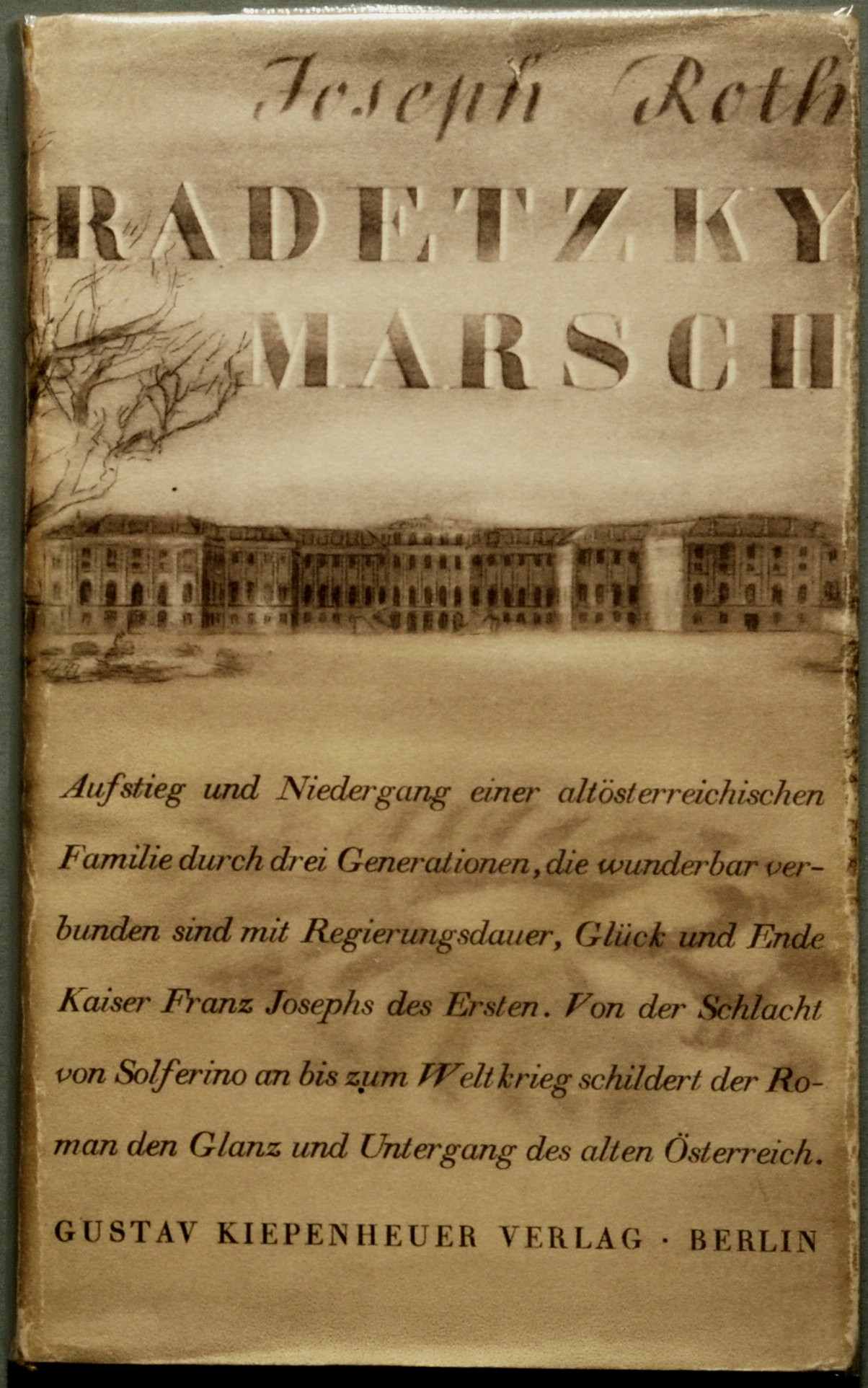
- First edition 1932
- Author: Joseph Roth
- Original title: Radetzkymarsch
- Language: German
- Genre: Novel
- Publisher: Gustav Kiepenheuer Verlag
- Publication date: 1932
- Publication place: Berlin, Germany
- Media type: Print (Hardback & Paperback)
- ISBN: 978-1-58567-326-1 (English translation by Joachim Neugroschel)
- OCLC: 124041549
- Followed by: The Emperor's Tomb

Radetzky March (German: Radetzkymarsch) is a 1932 family saga novel by Joseph Roth chronicling the decline and fall of the Habsburg Monarchy via the story of the Trotta family. Radetzkymarsch is an early example of a story that features the recurring participation of a historical figure, in this case the Emperor Franz Joseph I of Austria (1830–1916). Roth continues his account of the Trotta family to the time of the Anschluss in his The Emperor's Tomb (Kapuzinergruft, 1938). The novel, which covers the period from 1859 to 1916, has been published in English translations by Geoffrey Dunlop in 1933, Joachim Neugroschel in 1995 and Michael Hofmann in 2003.

== Plot ==
Radetzky March relates the stories of three generations of the Trotta family, professional Habsburg soldiers and career bureaucrats of Slovenian origin — from their zenith during the empire to the nadir and breakup of that world during and after the First World War. In 1859, the Austrian Empire (1804–67) was fighting the Second War of Italian Independence (29 April – 11 July 1859), against French and Italian belligerents: Napoleon III of France, the Emperor of the French, and the Kingdom of Piedmont-Sardinia.

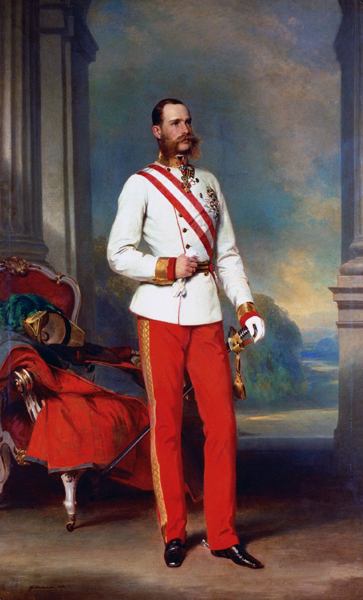
Portrait of Franz Joseph I by Franz Xaver Winterhalter, 1864. Franz Joseph in the uniform of Austrian field marshal.

In northern Italy, during the Battle of Solferino (24 June 1859), the well-intentioned, but blundering, Emperor Franz Joseph I, is almost killed. To thwart snipers, Infantry Lieutenant Trotta topples the Emperor from his horse. The Emperor awards Lt. Trotta the Order of Maria Theresa and ennobles him. Elevation to the nobility ultimately leads to the Trotta family's ruination, paralleling the imperial collapse of Austria-Hungary (1867–1918).

Following his social elevation Lt. Trotta, now Baron Trotta von Sipolje, is regarded by his family — including his father — as a man of superior quality. Although he does not assume the airs of a social superior, everyone from the new baron's old life perceives him as a changed person, as a nobleman. The perceptions and expectations of society eventually compel his reluctant integration into the aristocracy, a class amongst whom he feels temperamentally uncomfortable.

As a father, the first Baron von Trotta is disgusted by the historical revisionism that the national school system is teaching his son's generation. The school history textbook presents as fact a legend about his battlefield rescue of the Emperor. He finds especially galling the misrepresentation that infantry lieutenant Trotta was a cavalry officer.

The Baron appeals to the Emperor to have the school book corrected. The Emperor considers however that such a truth would yield an uninspiring, pedestrian history, useless to Habsburg patriotism. Therefore, whether or not history textbooks report Infantry Lt. Trotta's battlefield heroism as legend or as fact, he orders the story deleted from the official history of the Habsburg Empire. The subsequent von Trotta family generations misunderstand the elder generation's reverence for the legend of Lt. Trotta's saving the Emperor's life and consider themselves rightful aristocrats.

The disillusioned Baron Trotta opposes his son's aspirations to a military career, insisting he prepare to become a government official, the second most respected career in the Austrian Empire; by custom, the son was expected to obey. The son eventually becomes a district administrator in a Moravian town. As a father, the second Baron Trotta (still ignorant of why his war-hero father thwarted his military ambitions) sends his own son to become a cavalry officer; thereby grandfather's legend determines grandson's life. The cavalry officer's career of the third Baron Trotta comprises postings throughout Austria-Hungary and a dissipated life of wine, women, song, gambling, and dueling, off-duty pursuits characteristic of the military officer class in peace-time. Following a fatal duel the young Trotta transfers from the socially elite Uhlans to a less prestigious Jäger regiment. Baron Trotta's infantry unit then suppresses an industrial strike in a garrison town. Awareness of the aftermath of his professional brutality begins Lieutenant von Trotta's disillusionment with empire. He becomes greatly in debt due to gambling and is only saved after his father makes a direct appeal to the Emperor to sort out the matter. The young Trotta's debts are paid but he is killed soon after, bravely but pointlessly, in a minor skirmish with Russian troops during the opening days of World War I. His lonely and grieving father, the District Commissioner, dies after Franz Joseph two years later. Two mourners at the funeral conclude that neither the second von Trotta nor the old Emperor could have survived the dying Empire.

== Literary significance ==
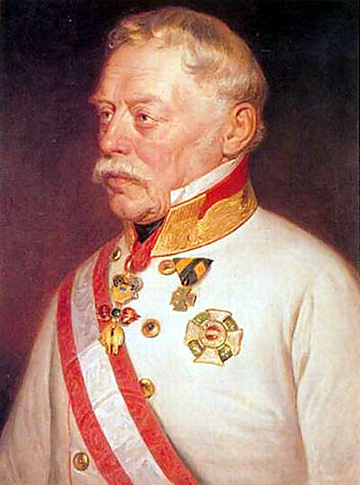
The novel's namesake, Josef Graf Radetzky von Radetz.

Radetzky March is Joseph Roth's best-known work. It was critically acclaimed after being first published in German in 1932 and then translated to English in 1933. In 2003, the German literary critic Marcel Reich-Ranicki included it in Der Kanon ("The Canon") of the most important German-language literary novels. It is a novel of the ironies and humour inherent in the well-intentioned actions that led to the decline and fall of a family and an empire; the Emperor Franz Josef I of Austria-Hungary remains ignorant of the unintended, negative consequences of so rewarding his subjects, and he continues conferring great favors, as with Lt. Trotta, after the Battle of Solferino in 1859.

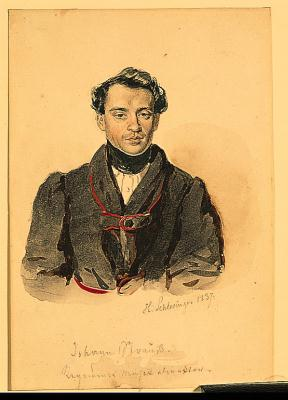
Composer Johann Strauss I, ca. 1837.

The novel's title derives from the Radetzky March, Op. 228 (1848), by Johann Strauss Sr. (1804–49), which honors the Austrian Field Marshal Joseph Radetzky von Radetz (1766–1858). It is a symbolic musical composition heard at critical narrative junctures of the Trotta family history.

During an interview on the United States TV show Charlie Rose in November 2001 on occasion of his own latest political novel, The Feast of the Goat, being published in English, Peruvian writer (and later 2010 Literature Nobel Prize winner) Mario Vargas Llosa, ranked The Radetzky March as the best political novel ever written.

When time passed, the multi-generation family saga Radetzky March brought its author an acclaim and recognition as "one of the greatest German-language writers of the 20th century."

== Publication history ==
The first German edition of the novel, Radetzkymarsch, was published in 1932 by Verlag Kiepenheuer in Berlin. In 2010, it was re-issued with epilogue and commentary by Werner Bellmann, Stuttgart: Reclam, 2010 (540 pages).

Radetzky March has been translated into various languages. Geoffrey Dunlop translated it to English in 1933. Soffy Topsøe translated it into Danish in that same year, and Hugo Hultenberg into Swedish. The 1934 French edition was translated by Blanche Gidon. A Russian translation was published in 1939, a Spanish edition in 1950, Czech in 1961, Romanian in 1966, Polish in 1977, Hebrew in 1980, Portuguese in 1984, Croatian in 1991. A notable English translation was done by the poet Michael Hofmann in 2003, who has translated a number of other works by Joseph Roth.

The first Persian translation by Mohammad Hemmati was published in 2016.

== Adaptations ==
Television adaptations appeared in 1965 and 1994.

== Translations into English ==
The Radetzky March has appeared in three English translations. The first, by Geoffrey Dunlop, was published in 1933, the same year as the German original. A second translation by Joachim Neugroschel appeared in 1995 (Overlook Press). The third, by Michael Hofmann, was published by Granta Books in 2002 and is generally considered the standard modern English edition; Hofmann, himself a native German speaker who writes in English, has been credited with capturing the elegiac, formally restrained prose style that distinguishes Roth's original.

== See also ==
- Best German Novels of the Twentieth Century
