= Flight without End =

1927 novel by Joseph Roth

- Author: Joseph Roth
- Original title: Die Flucht ohne Ende
- Translator: David Le Vay
- Language: German
- Publisher: Kurt Wolff Verlag
- Publication date: 1927
- Publication place: Germany
- English publication date: 1977
- Pages: 252

Flight without End (German: Die Flucht ohne Ende) is a 1927 novel by the Austrian writer Joseph Roth.

== Setting ==
The novel is set in the period between August 1916 and 27 August 1926. It starts in the city of Irkutsk and ends in Paris. During his journey the protagonist lives in Ukraine, Baku, Vienna and an unspecified German university town on the Rhine.

== Plot ==
The novel starts with protagonist Franz Tunda, born 1894, escaping confinement in Russia and finding a home with Baranowicz from Poland, who lives in Werchne-Udisnk. In the spring of 1919 the lieutenant hears of the end of the war and decides to go to Vienna to meet his fiancee, Miss Irene Hartmann. By September Tunda has made it to Ukraine. Caught up in the Russian Civil War, he first falls into the hands of the White Army, but later he ends up with the Red Army. Tunda falls in love with his supervisor, a Russian woman named Natascha Alexandrowna, becomes a revolutionary himself and gives passionate speeches in support of Communism.

Later, in Moscow, Tunda has to manage his postwar life. He is asked to join the Communist Party, but leaves to Georgia and falls in love with a woman called Alja. They get married in Baku. Tunda takes care of a French delegation from Paris, shows them around and sleeps with Mrs. G., the only woman in the delegation. Later he is regarded as a spy by the French. When saying goodbye, Mrs G. tells Tunda her address in France. Tunda leaves his wife, gets Austrian identity papers and later lives in Vienna on unemployment benefit. He misses his home in Siberia just as much as he misses Irene.

On his way to Paris, he visits his brother, a well-off bandmaster who lives in the Rhineland, but they don't have anything to talk about.

Tunda publishes a book about his experiences and sends his wife in Baku and Baranowicz a bit of money. In Paris, he meets Mrs G. again, but everyone in France seems to know that he is broke. Tunda and Irene pass each other once, but she does not recognize him and he choose to not recognize. Baranowicz writes a letter from Siberia: Alja has just arrived at his place and they are both waiting for Tunda. Tunda can now go back to the region of Irkutsk but he doesn't know what to do.

== Translations and adaptations ==
The novel was adapted into a 1985 film directed by Michael Kehlmann.

The novel was published in an English translation by David Le Vay in 1977.

A stage adaptation by Steve Waters was performed at the London Academy of Music and Dramatic Art in May 2006.

It has been recently, in 2023, translated into Persian by Ali Asadian (Persian) and published in Iran by Mad Publications. Ali Asadian has translated a number of Joseph Roth's books.

== See also ==
- 1927 in literature
- Austrian literature
