= Rebellion (novel) =

1924 novel by Joseph Roth

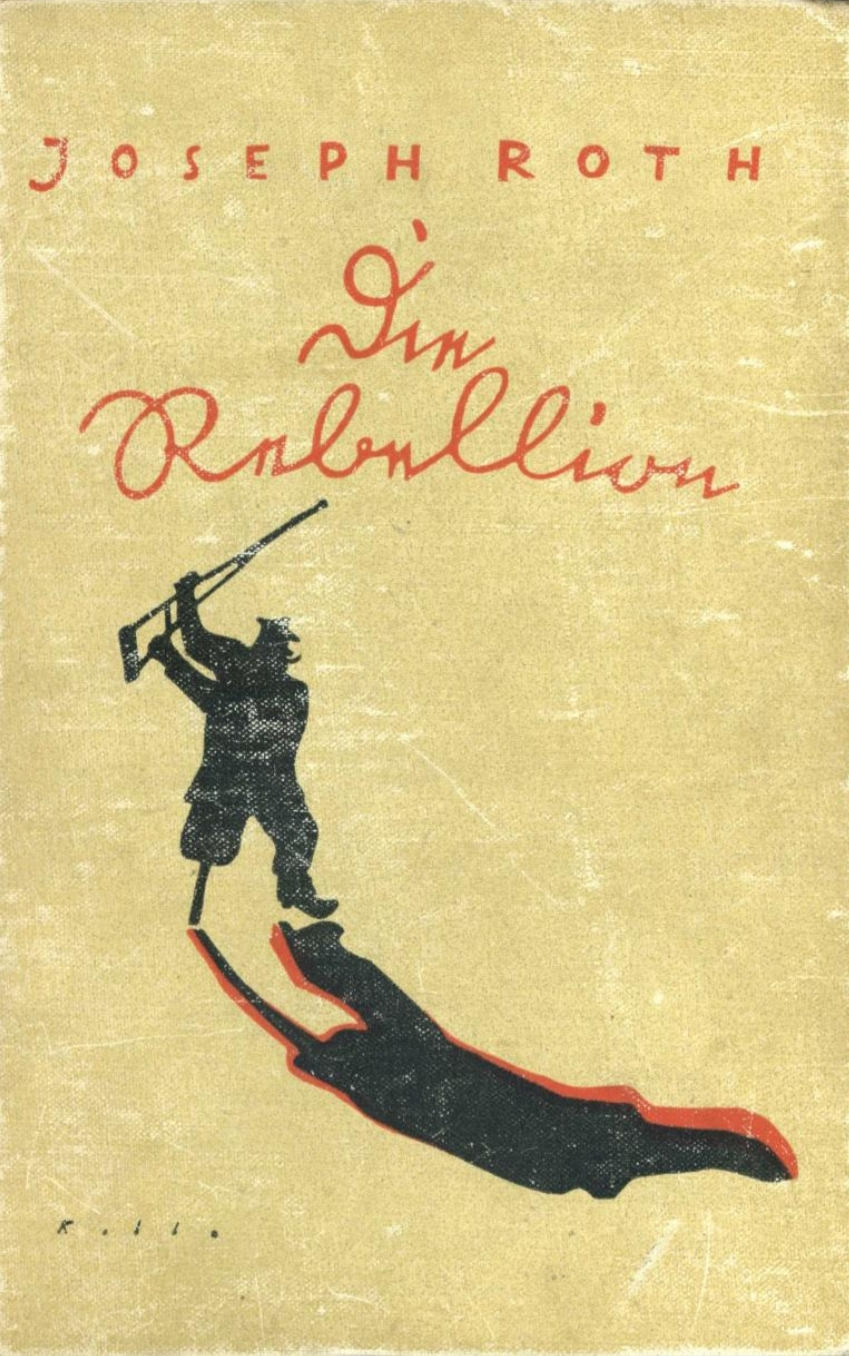
- First edition, 1924
- Author: Joseph Roth
- Original title: Die Rebellion
- Translator: Michael Hofmann
- Language: German
- Publisher: Vorwärts; Verlag Die Schmiede
- Publication date: 27 July 1924
- Publication place: Austria
- English publication date: 1999
- Pages: 137

Rebellion (German: Die Rebellion) is a 1924 novel by the Austrian writer Joseph Roth. It tells the story of a war veteran who has become a street musician after losing one leg. The novel was published in the newspaper Vorwärts from 27 July to 29 August 1924. It has been adapted for television twice: in 1962 by Wolfgang Staudte, and in 1993 by Michael Haneke.

== Reception ==
Nicholas Lezard of The Guardian reviewed the book in 2000: "Roth's tale has that very European, straightforward, fairy-tale logic that makes everything both inevitable yet strangely nightmarish. You wouldn't be far wrong to think of Roth as occupying the fourth corner of a square whose other apices are Kafka, Musil and Stefan Zweig." Lezard continued: "At one or two points the novel leaps into strange, almost magical-realist territory; not a term I like much, but it suggests the sense of dreamlike dislocation you feel from time to time while reading. This portrait of one of the shards of a splintering society is deceptively simple, but will haunt you for a long time afterwards."

In 2021 the Irish writer Hugo Hamilton published a novel entitled The Pages. It is a story told from the perspective of a book, a first edition of Roth’s The Rebellion.

== See also ==
- 1924 in literature
- Austrian literature
