= La Rebelión =

Song by Joe Arroyo y La Verdad

from the album Musa Original
- Released: 1986
- Genre: Salsa
- Songwriter: Joe Arroyo

"La Rebelión (No le pegue a la negra)" (translation "The Rebellion: Don't Hit the Black Woman") is a salsa song written by the Colombian singer-songwriter Joe Arroyo and performed by Arroyo and his band, La Verdad. It was released in 1986 on the Discos Fuentes label as the opening track on the "B" side of Arroyo's seventh studio album, Musa Original (SOF-5618). The song was an international hit.

According to multiple sources, the song was a self-plagiarism of an earlier song, "El Mulato", also written by Arroyo, that was released in 1978 by Robert y Su Banda on the album Soy la ley.

The recording features a piano solo by Chelito De Castro.

== Lyrics ==
The song tells the story of a married African couple, slaves of a Spaniard, in Cartagena, Colombia in the 17th century. The slave owner beats the wife of a slave, and the husband avenges her by starting a rebellion. The lyrics state that the black woman deserves respect and repeats variations on the chorus, "No le pegue a la negra" ("Don't hit the black woman").

== Honors ==
The song became an anthem of pride for Black people in Latin America. It has been included in several lists of the greatest Colombian and salsa songs of all time:

- Viva Music Colombia rated the song No. 1 on its list of the 100 most important Colombian songs of all time.
- It was listed in 2018 on Billboard's "15 Best Salsa Songs Ever".
- It was selected by Hip Latina in 2017 as one of the "13 Old School Songs Every Colombian Grew Up Listening To"; it was praised for its powerful lyrics and described as "one of those 'hold my drink, I'm going to go dance,' songs."
- In its list of the 50 best Colombian songs of all time, El Tiempo, Colombia's most widely circulated newspaper, ranked the song at No. 43.

== Covers ==
The song has since been covered by numerous artists, including the following:

- Raulin Rosendo covered the song on his 1991 album Salsa Solamente.
- François Raulin covered the song in 1995.
- Alberto Barros covered the song on his 2007 album Tributo a la Salsa Colombiana, Vol. 1.
- Blanca Star Olivera covered the song on her album New York Latin Hits.
- J Balvin covered the song in 2019 in a salsa-reggaeton blend, and performed it for a television commercial for Aguila beer.
