= Joseph Roth =

Austro-Hungarian novelist and journalist (1894–1939)

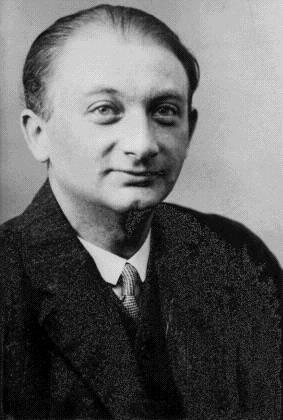
- Roth in 1926
- Born: Moses Joseph Roth; 2 September 1894; Brody, Galicia, Austria-Hungary (now in Ukraine)
- Died: 27 May 1939 (aged 44); Paris, France
- Resting place: Cimetière de Thiais
- Education: University of Lemberg; University of Vienna
- Occupations: Journalist, novelist
- Spouse: Friederike (Friedl) Reichler
- Partner: Irmgard Keun
- Writing career
- Language: German
- Years active: 1920s–1939
- Period: Interwar period
- Notable works: Radetzky March, The Legend of the Holy Drinker, Job

Moses Joseph Roth (Austrian German: [roːt]; 2 September 1894 – 27 May 1939) was an Austro-Hungarian journalist and novelist, best known for his family saga Radetzky March (1932), about the decline and fall of the Austro-Hungarian Empire, his novel of Jewish life Job (1930) and his seminal essay "Juden auf Wanderschaft" (1927; translated into English as The Wandering Jews), a fragmented account of the Jewish migrations from eastern to western Europe in the aftermath of World War I and the Russian Revolution. In the 21st century, publications in English of Radetzky March and of collections of his journalism from Berlin and Paris created a revival of interest in Roth.

== Biography ==
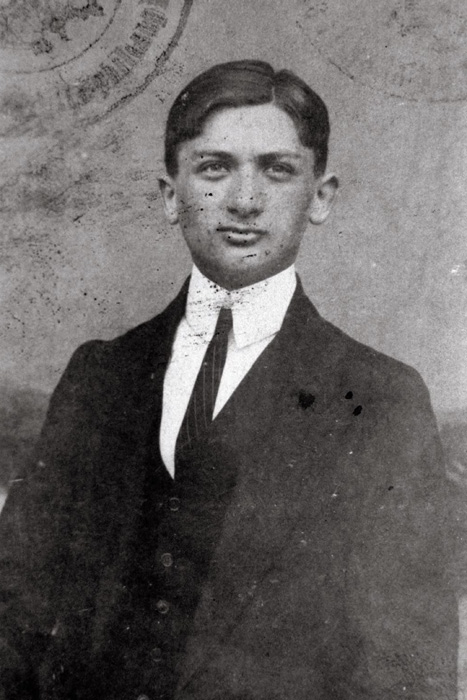
Student identity card photo of Joseph Roth (ca. 1914)

Joseph Roth was born into a Jewish family and grew up in Brody (currently in Ukraine), a small town near Lemberg (now Lviv, Ukraine) in East Galicia, in the easternmost reaches of what was then the Austro-Hungarian empire. Jewish culture played an important role in the life of the town, which had a large Jewish population. Roth grew up with his mother and her relatives; he never saw his father, who had disappeared before he was born.

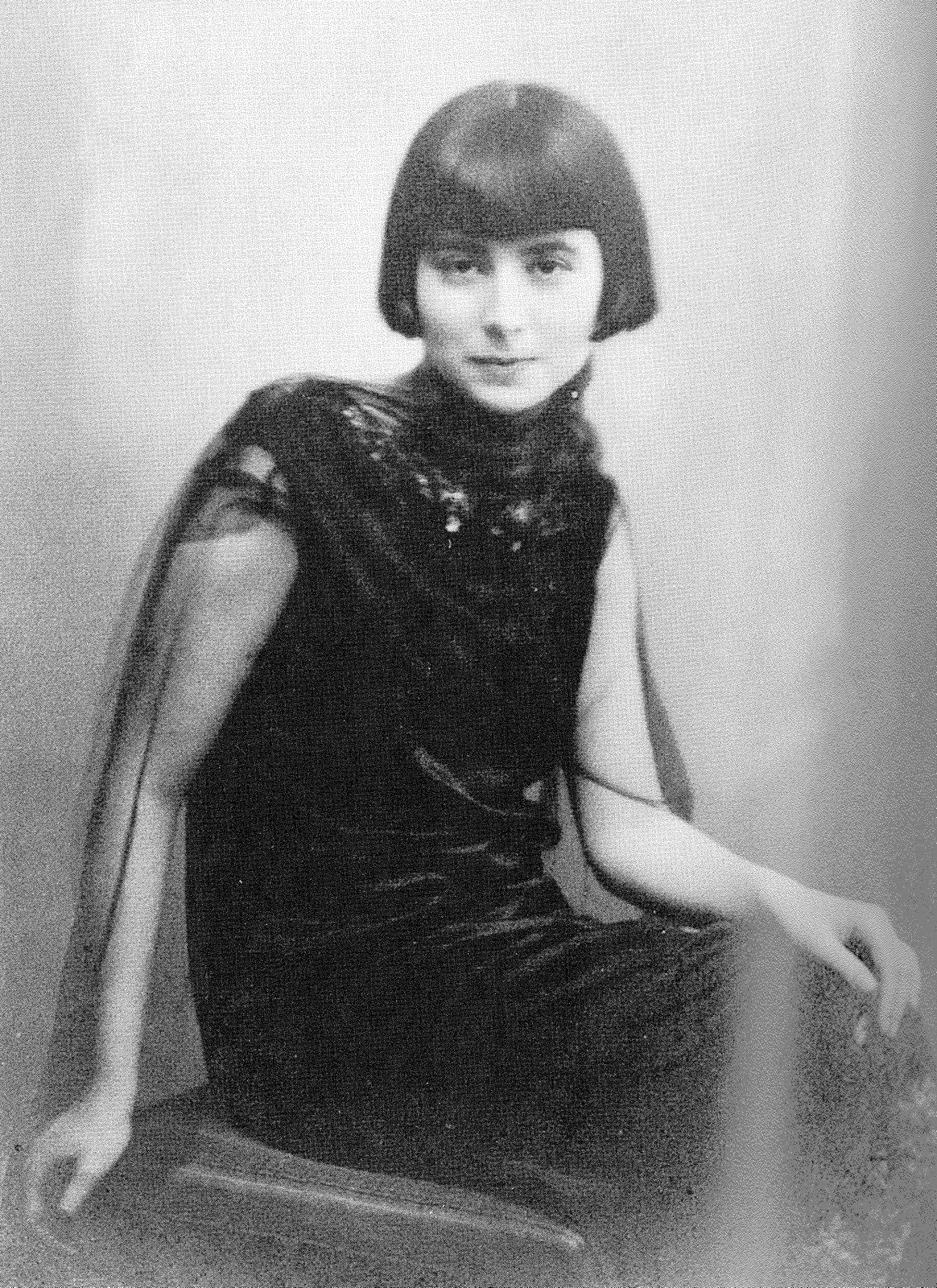
Friedl Reichler, c. 1920

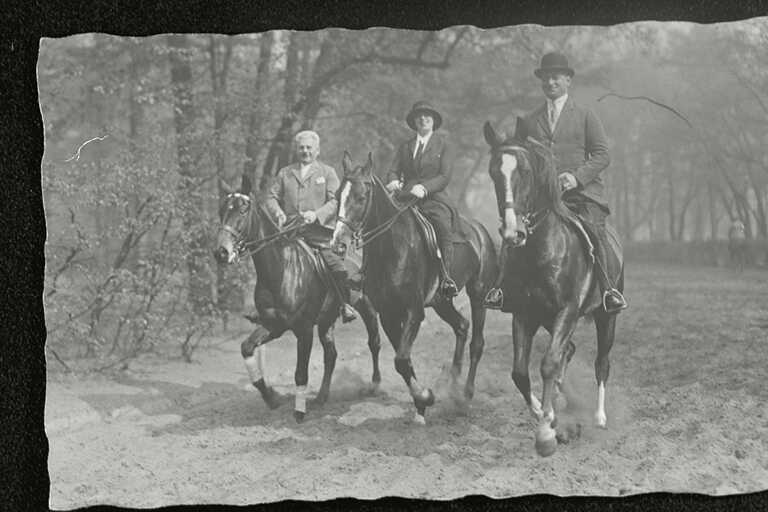
Joseph and Friederike (left, center) horseback riding

After secondary school, Joseph Roth moved to Lemberg to begin his university studies in 1913, before transferring to the University of Vienna in 1914 to study philosophy and German literature. In 1916, Roth broke off his university studies and volunteered to serve in the Austro-Hungarian Army on the Eastern Front, "though possibly only as an army journalist or censor". This experience had a major and long-lasting influence on his life. So, too, did the collapse in 1918 of the Habsburg Empire, which marked the beginning of a pronounced sense of "homelessness" that was to feature regularly in his work. As he wrote: "My strongest experience was the War and the destruction of my fatherland, the only one I ever had, the Dual Monarchy of Austria-Hungary."

Roth married Friederike (Friedl) Reichler in 1922. In the late 1920s, his wife became schizophrenic, which threw Roth into a deep crisis, both emotionally and financially. She lived for years in a sanatorium and was later murdered in the Nazis' Aktion T4 programme.

In 1929 he met Andrea Manga Bell, born in Hamburg and unhappily married to Alexandre Douala Manga Bell, Prince of Douala in Cameroon. Her husband had returned to Cameroon while she and their children stayed in Europe. When Roth met her, she was editor of the Ullstein magazine Gebrauchsgraphik. Being a prominent liberal Jewish journalist, Roth left Germany when Adolf Hitler became Reich Chancellor on 30 January 1933. Andrea Manga Bell accompanied him with her children. He spent most of the next six years in Paris, a city he loved. His essays written in France display a delight in the city and its culture.

Shortly after Hitler's rise to power, in February 1933, Roth wrote in a prophetic letter to his friend, the Austrian writer Stefan Zweig:

You will have realized by now that we are drifting towards great catastrophes. Apart from the private—our literary and financial existence is destroyed—it all leads to a new war. I won't bet a penny on our lives. They have succeeded in establishing a reign of barbarity. Do not fool yourself. Hell reigns.

The relationship with Andrea Manga Bell failed due to financial problems and Roth's jealousy. From 1936 to 1938, Roth had a romantic relationship with Irmgard Keun. They worked together, traveling to Paris, Wilna, Lemberg, Warsaw, Vienna, Salzburg, Brussels and Amsterdam.

Without denying his Jewish origins, Roth considered his relationship to Catholicism very important. In the final years of his life, he may have converted: Michael Hofmann states in the preface to the collection of essays The White Cities (also published as Report from a Parisian Paradise) that Roth "was said to have had two funerals, one Jewish, one Catholic".

In his last years, he moved from hotel to hotel, drinking heavily and becoming increasingly anxious about money and the future. Despite suffering from chronic alcoholism, he remained prolific until his death in Paris in 1939. His novella The Legend of the Holy Drinker (1939) chronicles the attempts made by an alcoholic vagrant to regain his dignity and honor a debt.

Roth's final collapse apparently was precipitated by learning that playwright Ernst Toller had hanged himself in New York on 22 May. Roth died on 27 May from double pneumonia, aggravated by abrupt withdrawal of alcohol that produced delirium tremens, and was buried on 30 May at the Cimetière de Thiais south of Paris.

== Journalism and literary career ==
In 1918, Roth returned to Vienna and began writing for left-wing newspapers, signing articles published by Vorwärts as Der rote Joseph (The red Joseph, a play on his surname, which is homophonous with German rot, "red", which is also the signalling color of communist parties in Europe). In 1920 he moved to Berlin, where he worked as a successful journalist for the Neue Berliner Zeitung and, from 1921, for the Berliner Börsen-Courier. In 1923 he began his association with the liberal Frankfurter Zeitung, traveling widely throughout Europe, and reporting from the South of France, the USSR, Albania, Poland, Italy, and Germany. According to his main English translator, Michael Hofmann, "He was one of the most distinguished and best-paid journalists of the period, being paid at the dream rate of one Deutschmark per line." In 1925 he spent a period working in France. He never again resided permanently in Berlin. Roth has been referred to as one of the novelists who helped the emergence of what is nowadays called the Habsburg myth.

In 1923, Roth's first (unfinished) novel, The Spider's Web, was serialized in an Austrian newspaper. He went on to achieve moderate success as a novelist with a series of books exploring life in post-war Europe, but only upon publication of Job and Radetzky March did he achieve acclaim for his fiction rather than his journalism.

From 1930, Roth's fiction became less concerned with contemporary society, with which he had become increasingly disillusioned, and began to evoke a melancholic nostalgia for life in imperial Central Europe before 1914. He often portrayed the fate of homeless wanderers looking for a place to live, in particular Jews and former citizens of the old Austria-Hungary, who, with the downfall of the monarchy, had lost their only possible Heimat ("true home"). In his later works, Roth appeared to wish that the monarchy could be restored. His longing for a more tolerant past may be partly explained as a reaction against the political extremism of the time, which culminated in Germany with National Socialism. The novel Radetzky March (1932) and the story "The Bust of the Emperor" (1935) are typical of this late phase. In another novel, The Emperor's Tomb (1938), Roth describes the fate of a cousin of the hero of Radetzky March up to Germany's annexation of Austria in 1938.

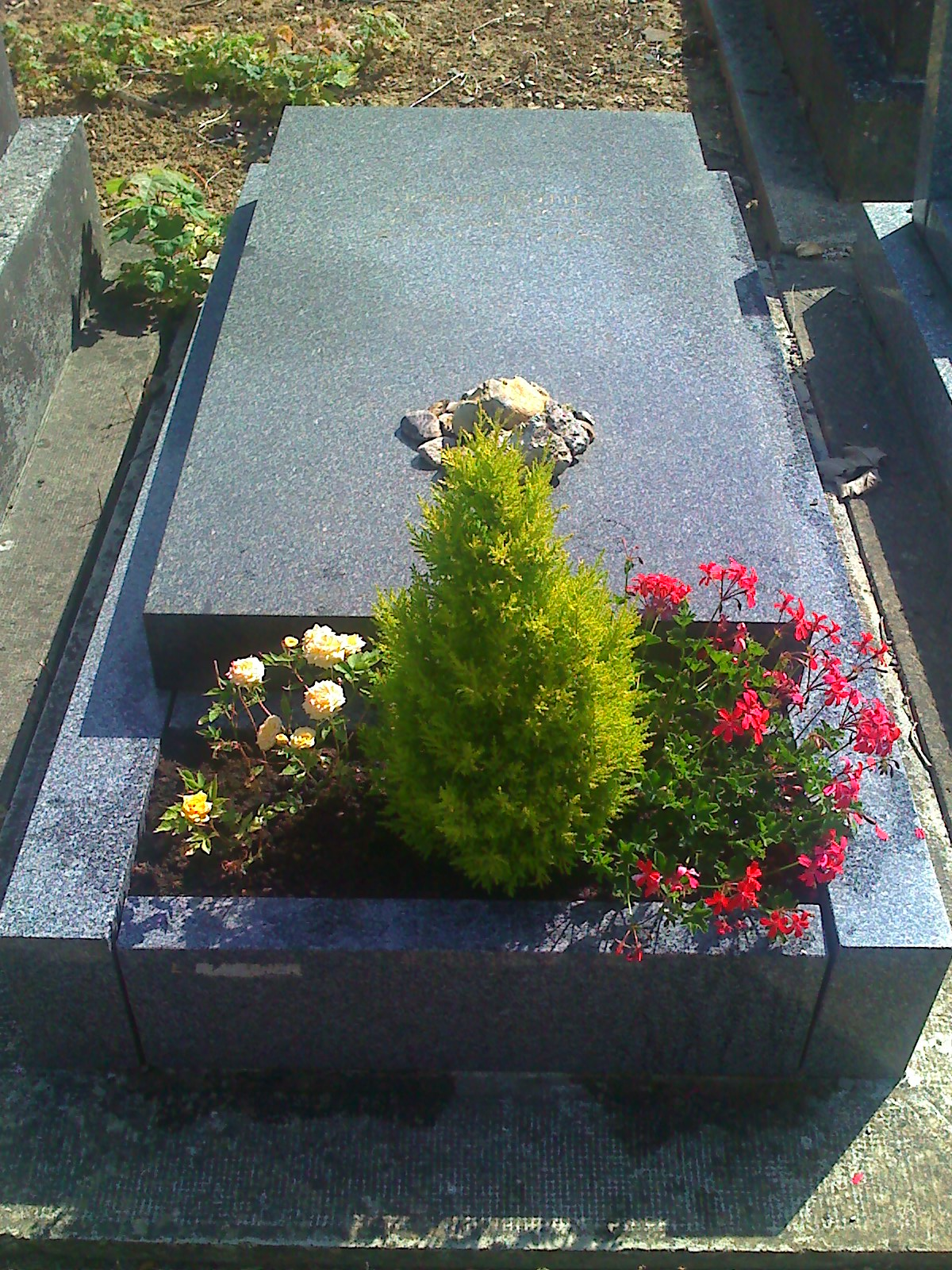
Grave of Roth at the Cimetière de Thiais

== Published works ==
Fiction

- The Spider's Web (Das Spinnennetz) (1923, adapted in 1989 into a film of the same title)
- Hotel Savoy (1924)
- The Rebellion (Die Rebellion) (1924; some editions of the English translation call it simply Rebellion)
- "April: The Story of a Love Affair" (April. Die Geschichte einer Liebe) (1925; in The Collected Stories)
- "The Blind Mirror" (Der blinde Spiegel) (1925; in The Collected Stories)
- Flight without End (Die Flucht ohne Ende) (1927)
- Zipper and His Father (Zipper und sein Vater) (1928)
- Right and Left (Rechts und links) (1929)
- The Silent Prophet (Der stumme Prophet) (1929)
- Job (Hiob) (1930)
- Radetzky March (Radetzkymarsch) (1932; some English translations call it The Radetzky March)
- "Fallmerayer the Stationmaster" (Stationschef Fallmerayer) (1933; in The Collected Stories)
- Tarabas (1934)
- "The Bust of the Emperor" (Die Büste des Kaisers) (1934; in The Collected Stories)
- Confession of a Murderer (Beichte eines Mörders) (1936)
- The Hundred Days (Die hundert Tage) (1936)
- Weights and Measures (Das falsche Gewicht) (1937) translation by David Le Vay with Pushkin Press, 2024.
- The Emperor's Tomb (Die Kapuzinergruft) (1938)
- The String of Pearls (Die Geschichte von der 1002. Nacht) (1939)
- The Legend of the Holy Drinker (Die Legende vom heiligen Trinker) (1939)
- "The Leviathan" (Der Leviathan) (1940; in The Collected Stories)
- The Collected Stories of Joseph Roth, trans. by Michael Hofmann, New York: W. W. Norton (2003)

Non-Fiction

- The Wandering Jews (Juden auf Wanderschaft) (1927; reportage)
- The Antichrist (Der Antichrist) (essay, 1934)
- What I Saw: Reports from Berlin, 1920–1933, trans. by Michael Hofmann, New York: W. W. Norton (2002) and London: Granta Books (2003)
- The White Cities: Reports from France, 1925–39, trans. by Michael Hofmann, London: Granta Books (2004); issued in the United States as Report from a Parisian Paradise: Essays from France, 1925–1939, New York: W. W. Norton & Company (2004)
- Joseph Roth: A Life in Letters, trans. and edited by Michael Hofmann, New York: W. W. Norton (2012)
- The Hotel Years, trans. and edited by Michael Hofmann, New York: New Directions (2015)

== Filmography ==
- Sins of Man, directed by Otto Brower (1936, based on the novel Job), starring Jean Hersholt
- Die Rebellion, directed by Wolfgang Staudte (TV film, 1962, based on the novel Rebellion), starring Josef Meinrad
- Die Legende vom heiligen Trinker, directed by Franz Josef Wild (TV film, 1963, based on the novel The Legend of the Holy Drinker), starring Hannes Messemer
- Radetzkymarsch, directed by Michael Kehlmann (TV film, 1965, based on the novel Radetzky March), starring Helmuth Lohner
- Die Geschichte der 1002. Nacht, directed by Peter Beauvais (TV film, 1969, based on the novel The String of Pearls), starring Johanna Matz
- Beichte eines Mörders, directed by Wilm ten Haaf (TV miniseries, 1969, based on the novel Confession of a Murderer), starring Hannelore Elsner
- Trotta, directed by Johannes Schaaf (1971, based on the novel The Emperor's Tomb), starring Doris Kunstmann
- Das falsche Gewicht, directed by Bernhard Wicki (1971, based on the novel Weights and Measures), starring Helmut Qualtinger
- Stationschef Fallmerayer, directed by Walter Davy (TV film, 1976, based on the novella Stationschef Fallmerayer), starring Odile Versois
- Job, directed by Michael Kehlmann (TV miniseries, 1978, based on the novel Job), starring Günter Mack
- Geschichte einer Liebe, directed by Dagmar Damek (TV film, 1978, based on the story April: The Story of a Love Affair), starring Bruno Ganz
- Tarabas, directed by Michael Kehlmann (TV film, 1981, based on the novel Tarabas), starring Helmuth Lohner
- Die Flucht ohne Ende, directed by Michael Kehlmann (TV film, 1985, based on the novel Flight without End), starring Helmuth Lohner and Mario Adorf
- The Legend of the Holy Drinker, directed by Ermanno Olmi (1988, based on the novel The Legend of the Holy Drinker), starring Rutger Hauer
- Spider's Web, directed by Bernhard Wicki (1989, based on the novel The Spider's Web), starring Ulrich Mühe, Armin Mueller-Stahl and Klaus Maria Brandauer
- Die Rebellion, directed by Michael Haneke (TV film, 1993, based on the novel Rebellion)
- Radetzkymarsch, directed by Axel Corti (TV miniseries, 1994, based on the novel Radetzky March), starring Max von Sydow and Charlotte Rampling

== See also ==
- Exilliteratur
- List of Austrian writers
