= Franz Kafka =

German-language writer from Prague (1883–1924)

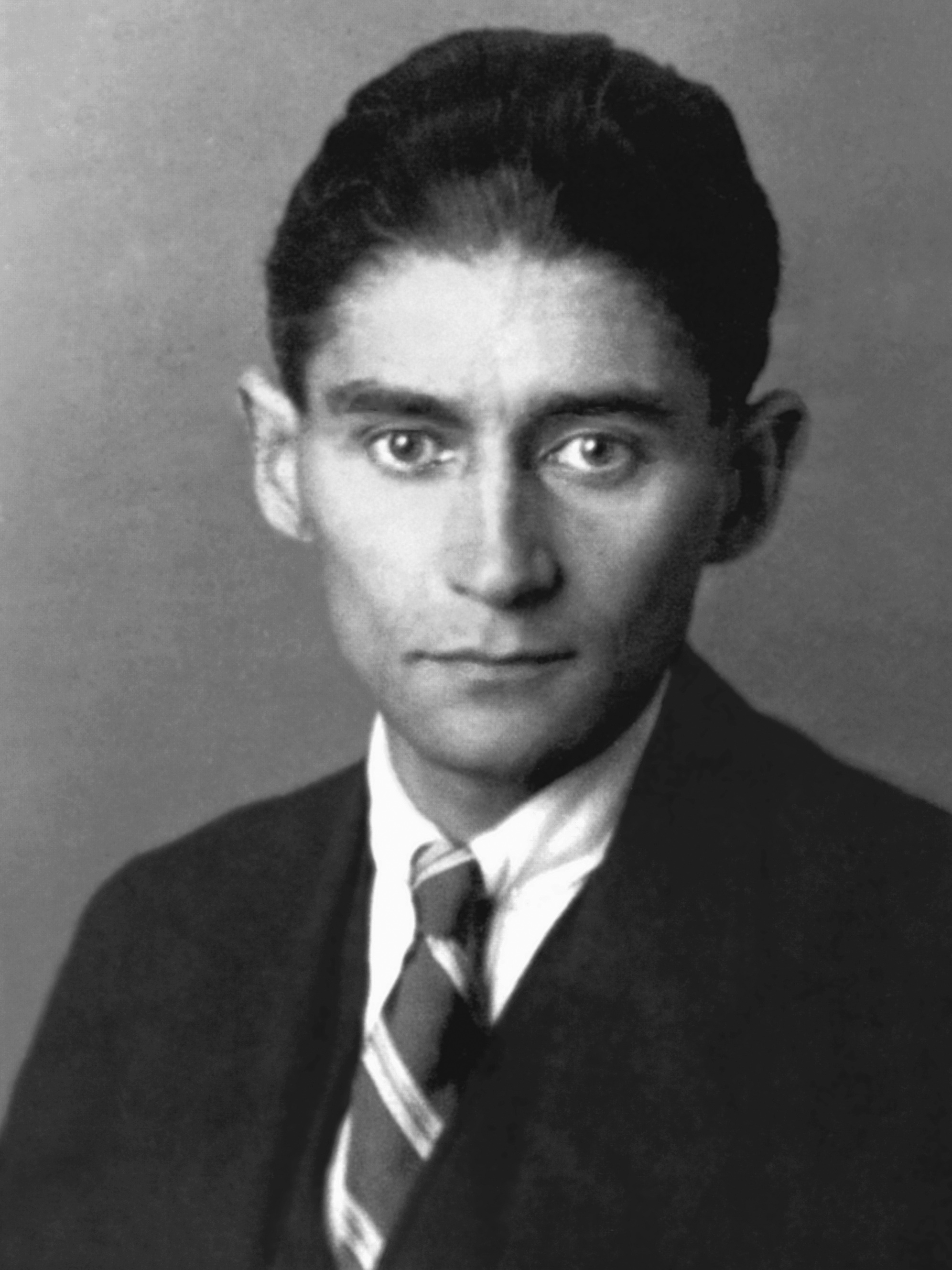
- Kafka in 1923
- Born: 3 July 1883; Prague, Austria-Hungary
- Died: 3 June 1924 (aged 40); Klosterneuburg, Austria
- Burial place: New Jewish Cemetery, Prague
- Citizenship: Austria (until 1918) (Note: Based on Austro-Hungarian nationality law of 1867); Czechoslovakia (from 1918)
- Education: German Charles-Ferdinand University
- Occupations: Novelist; short story writer; insurance officer
- Works: List
- Style: Modernism

Franz Kafka (Note: UK: /ˈkæfkə/, US: /ˈkɑːf-/; German: [ˈfʁant͡s ˈkafka]; Czech: [ˈkafka] (Note: In Czech, he was sometimes called František Kafka.)) (3 July 1883 – 3 June 1924) was a German-language Jewish writer from Prague. Widely regarded as a major figure of 20th-century literature, his works fuse elements of realism and the fantastique, and typically feature isolated protagonists facing bizarre or surreal predicaments and incomprehensible bureaucratic powers. The term Kafkaesque has entered the lexicon to describe situations like those depicted in his writings. His best-known works include the novella The Metamorphosis (1915) and the novels The Trial (1925) and The Castle (1926). He is also celebrated for his brief fables and aphorisms, which frequently incorporated comedic elements alongside the darker themes of his longer works. (Note: Like his longer fiction, these sketches may be brutal in some aspects, but their dreadfulness is frequently comedic. A close acquaintance of Kafka's remarked that both his audience and the author himself sometimes laughed so much during readings that Kafka could not continue in his delivery, finding it necessary to collect himself before completing his recitation of the work.) His work has widely influenced artists, philosophers, composers, filmmakers, literary historians, religious scholars, and cultural theorists.

Kafka was born into a middle-class German-speaking family. He trained as a lawyer, and after completing his legal education was employed in various legal and insurance jobs. His professional obligations led to internal conflict, because he felt that his true vocation was writing. Only a minority of his works were published during his life: the story collections Contemplation (1912) and A Country Doctor (1919), and individual stories, such as his novella The Metamorphosis, were published in literary magazines, but they received little attention. He wrote hundreds of letters to family and close friends, including his father, with whom he had a strained and formal relationship. He became engaged to several women but never married. He died relatively unknown in 1924 of tuberculosis, aged 40. His literary executor and friend Max Brod ignored Kafka's wishes to destroy his remaining works, publishing them to eventual acclaim.

== Life ==
=== Early life ===
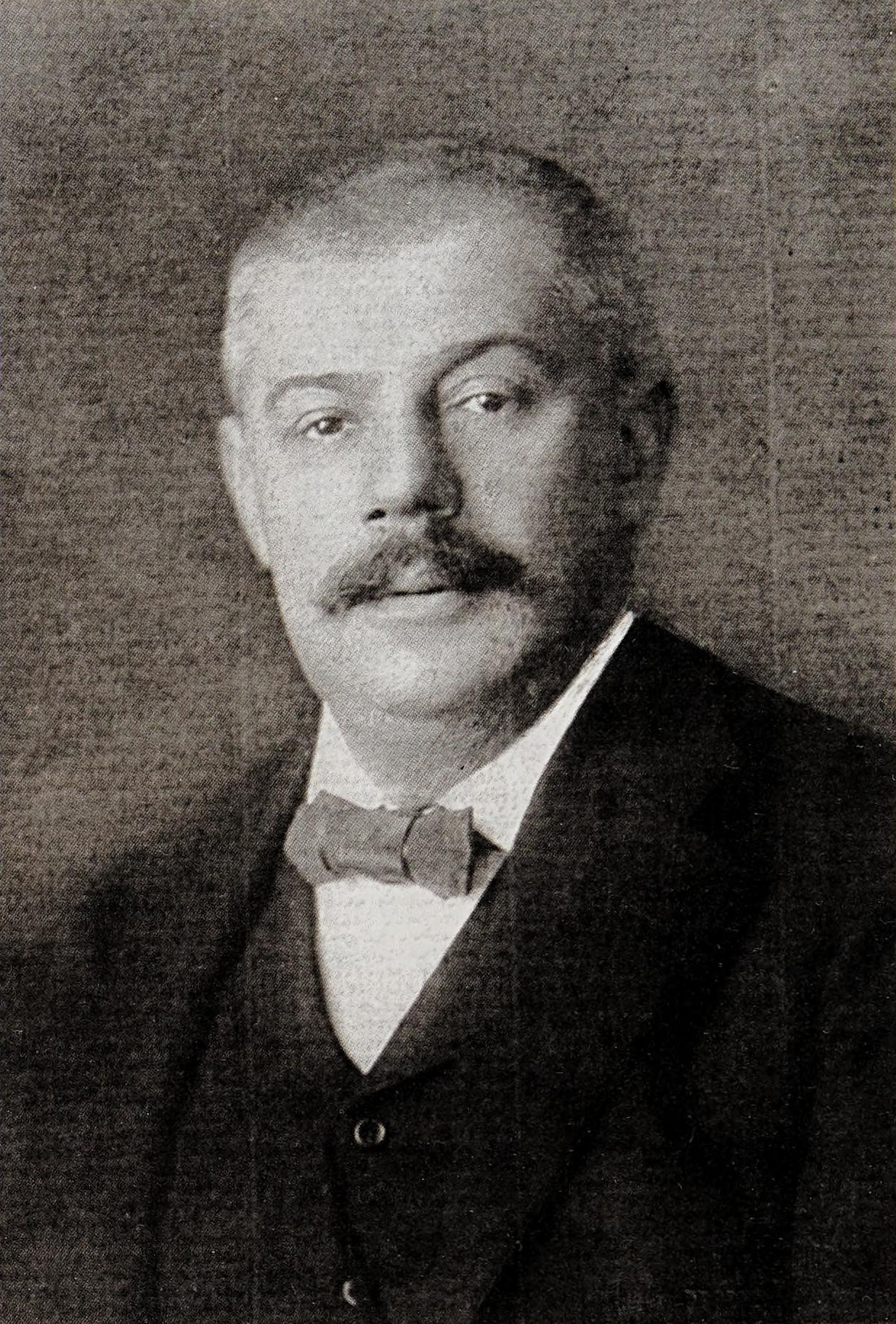
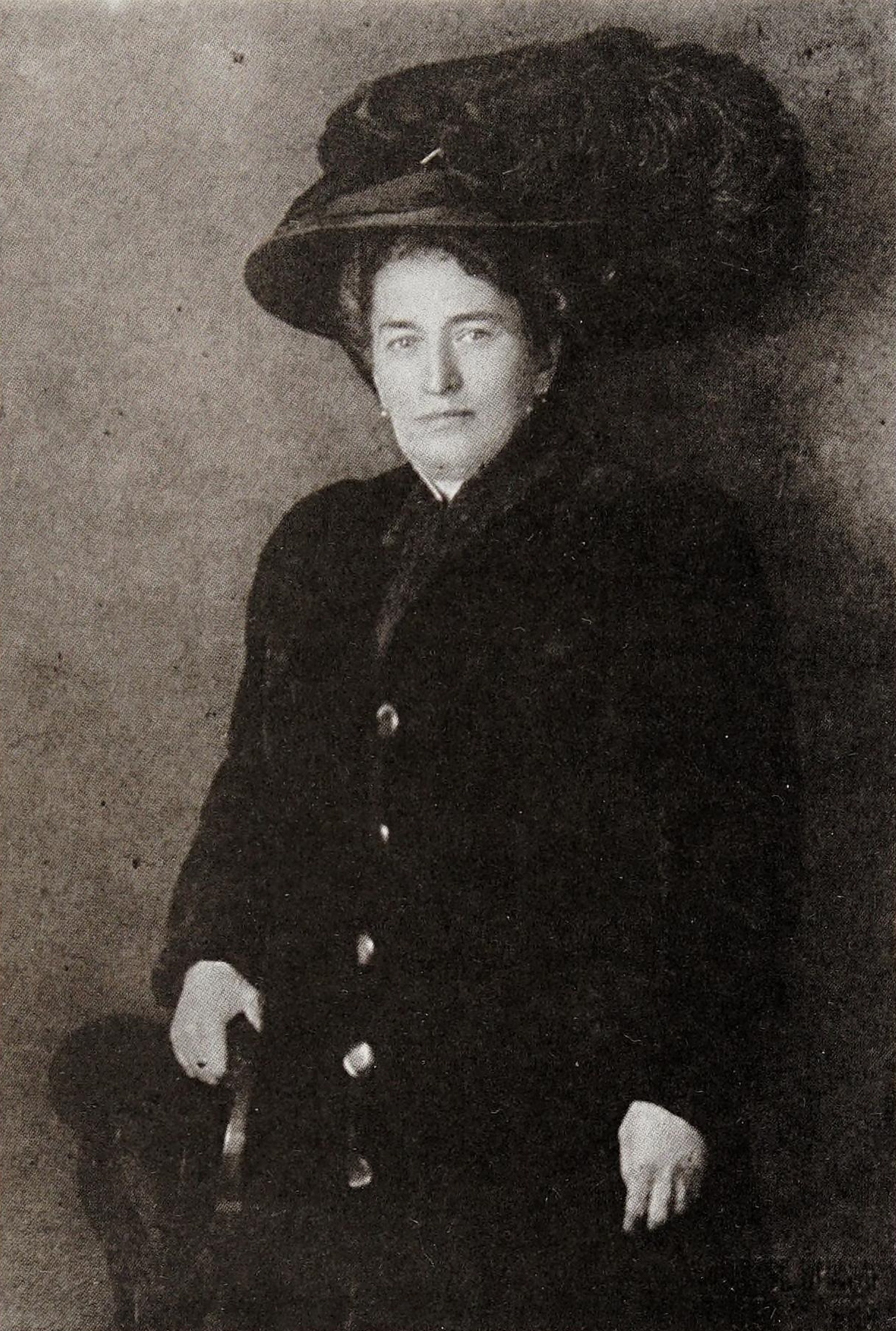
Franz Kafka's parents, Hermann and Julie Kafka

Kafka was born near the Old Town Square in Prague, then part of the Kingdom of Bohemia within Austria-Hungary. His family were German-speaking middle-class Ashkenazi Jews. His father, Hermann Kafka, was the fourth child of Jakob Kafka, a shochet or kosher butcher in Osek, a Czech village with a large Jewish population near Strakonice in southern Bohemia. Hermann "came to Prague in the 1870s and opened a store selling haberdashery and ladies' accessories". He employed up to 15 people and used the image of a jackdaw (kavka in Czech, pronounced and colloquially written as kafka) as his business logo. Kafka's mother, Julie, was the daughter of Jakob Löwy, a "cloth-maker in Humpolec in eastern Bohemia".

Kafka's parents, traditional Jews, spoke German influenced by their native Yiddish; their children were raised to speak Standard German. The cleanliness and "almost platonic purity" of Kafka's German may have resulted from his having grown up speaking the language in a country whose primary language was not German. His prose is not marked by slang or fads of contemporary usage that was typical of his generational peers from the heart of the empire in Vienna nor from the centre of the Second Reich in Berlin.

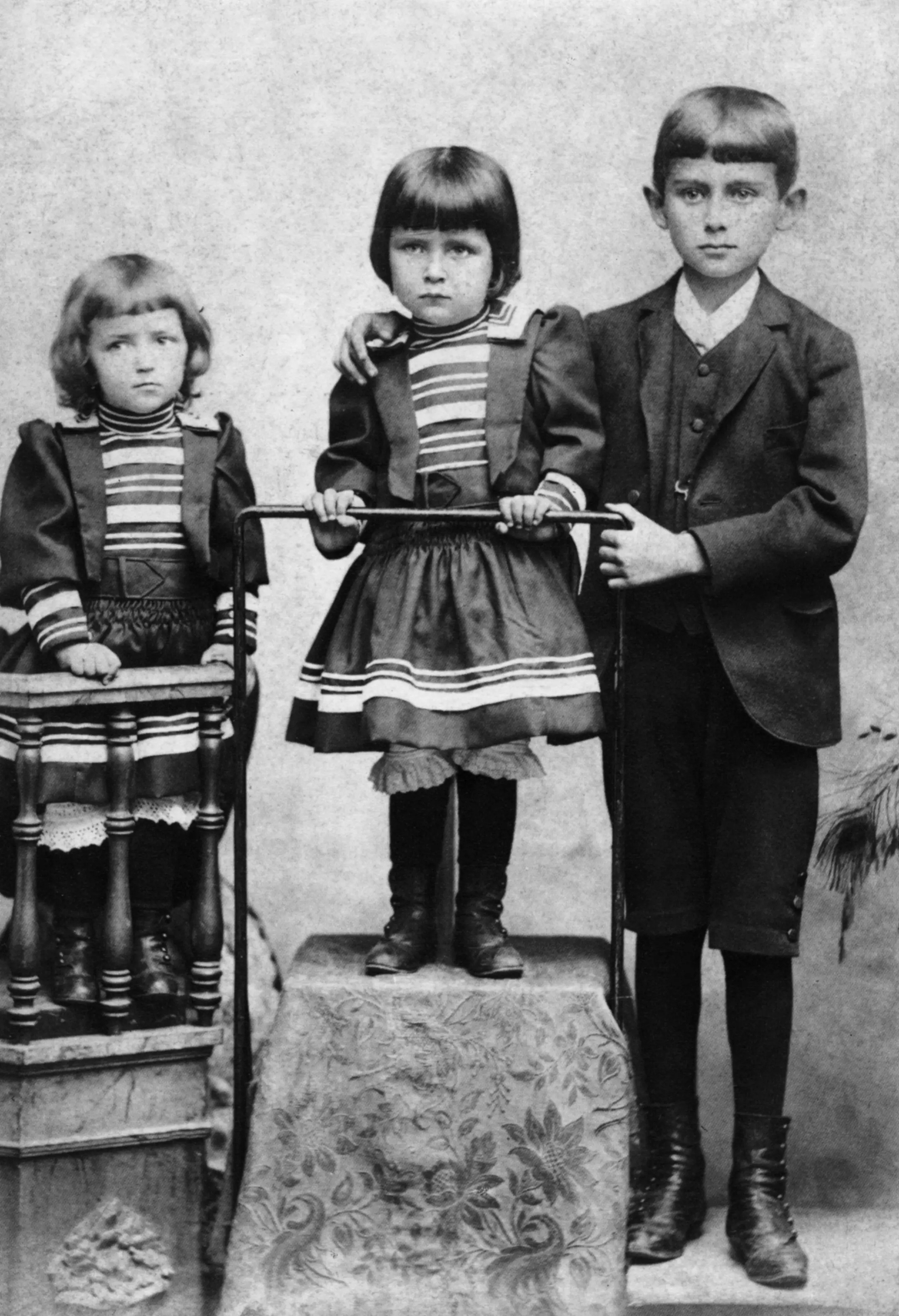
Kafka at about ten with his sisters Valli (left) and Elli (center)

Hermann and Julie had six children, of whom Franz was the eldest. Franz's two brothers, Georg and Heinrich, died in infancy before Franz was seven; his three sisters were Gabriele ("Elli"), Valerie ("Valli") and Ottilie ("Ottla"). All three were murdered in the Holocaust during World War II. Valli was deported to the Łódź Ghetto in occupied Poland in 1942, but that is the last documentation of her; it is assumed she did not survive the war. Ottilie was Kafka's favourite sister.

Hermann is described by Kafka scholar and translator Stanley Corngold as a "huge, selfish, overbearing businessman" and by Franz Kafka as "a true Kafka in strength, health, appetite, loudness of voice, eloquence, self-satisfaction, worldly dominance, endurance, presence of mind, knowledge of human nature, a certain way of doing things on a grand scale, of course also with all the defects and weaknesses that go with these advantages and into which your temperament and sometimes your hot temper drive you". On business days, both parents were absent from the home, with Julie Kafka working as many as 12 hours each day helping to manage the family business. Consequently, Kafka's childhood was somewhat lonely, and the children were reared largely by a series of governesses and servants. Kafka's troubled relationship with his father is evident in his Brief an den Vater (Letter to His Father) of more than 100 pages, in which he complains of being profoundly affected by his father's authoritarian and demanding character; his mother, in contrast, was quiet and shy. The dominating figure of Kafka's father had a significant influence on Kafka's writing.

The Kafka family had a servant girl living with them in a cramped apartment. Franz's room was often cold. In November 1913, the family moved into a bigger apartment, even though Ellie and Valli had married and moved out of the first apartment. In early August 1914, just after World War I began, the sisters did not know where their husbands were in the military and moved back in with the family in this larger apartment. Both Ellie and Valli also had children. Franz at age 31 moved into Valli's former apartment, quiet by contrast, and lived by himself for the first time.

=== Education ===
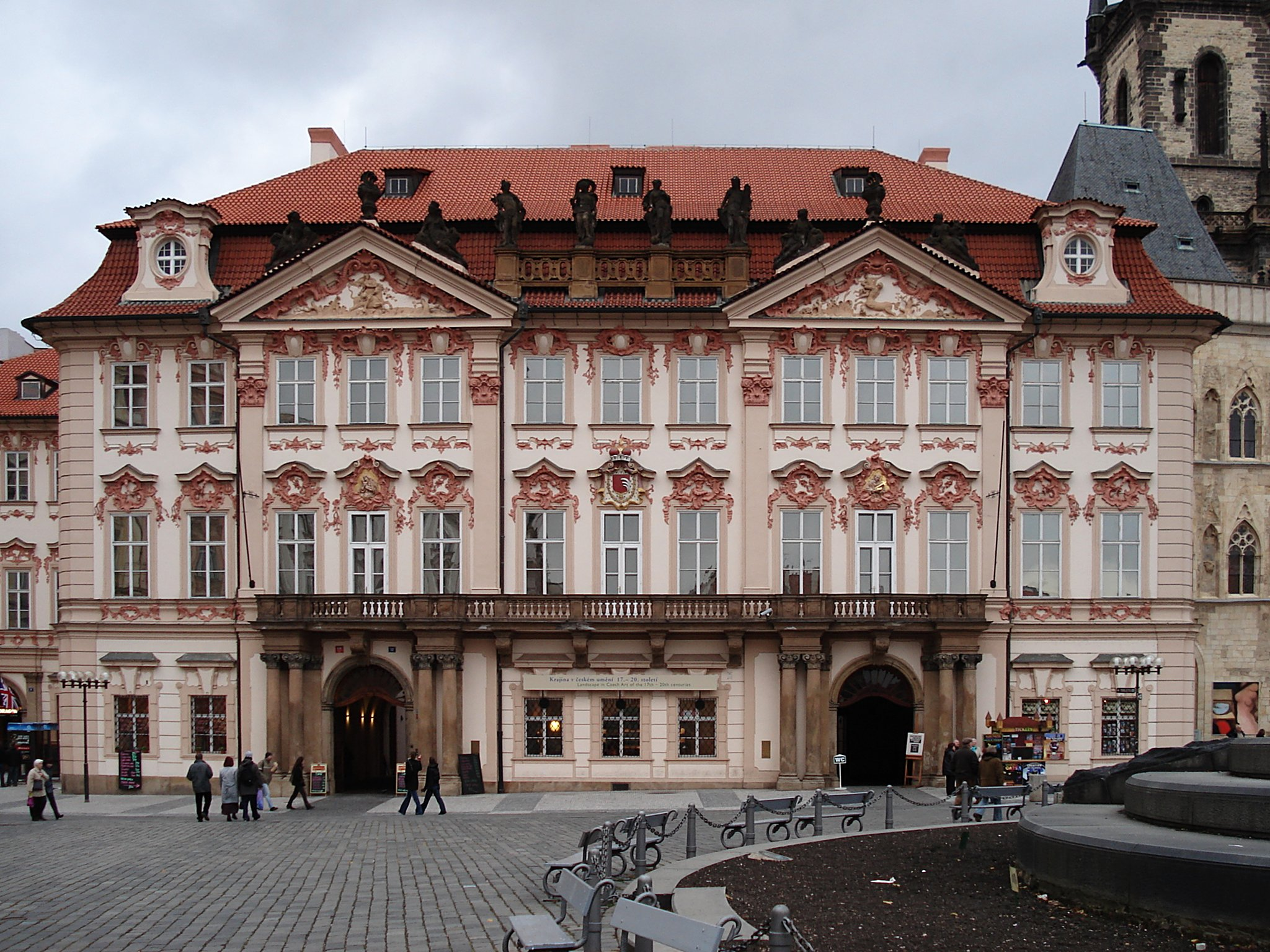
Kinský Palace where Kafka attended gymnasium and his father owned a shop

From 1889 to 1893, Kafka attended the German boys' elementary school at the Masný trh/Fleischmarkt (meat market), now known as Masná Street. His Jewish education ended with his bar mitzvah celebration at the age of 13. Kafka never enjoyed attending the synagogue and went with his father only on four high holidays each year.

After leaving elementary school in 1893, Kafka was admitted to the rigorous classics-oriented state gymnasium, Altstädter Deutsches Gymnasium, an academic secondary school at Old Town Square, located within Kinský Palace. German was the language of instruction, but Kafka also spoke and wrote in Czech. He studied the latter at the gymnasium for eight years, achieving good grades. Kafka received compliments for his Czech, but never considered himself fluent in the language. He spoke German with a Czech accent. He completed his Matura exams in 1901.

Kafka was admitted to the Deutsche Karl-Ferdinands-Universität of Prague in 1901. He was originally admitted for philosophy, and he had additionally signed up for chemistry. Kafka began studying chemistry but switched to law after two weeks. Although this field did not excite him, it offered a range of career possibilities, which pleased his father. In addition, law required a longer course of study, giving Kafka time to take classes in German studies and art history. He also joined a student club, Lese- und Redehalle der Deutschen Studenten (Reading and Lecture Hall of the German students), which organised literary events, readings and other activities. Among Kafka's friends were the journalist Felix Weltsch, who studied philosophy, the actor Yitzchak Lowy who came from an orthodox Hasidic Warsaw family, and the writers Ludwig Winder, Oskar Baum and Franz Werfel.

At the end of his first year of studies, Kafka met Max Brod, a fellow law student who became a close friend for life. Years later, Brod coined the term Der enge Prager Kreis ("The Close Prague Circle") to describe the group of writers, which included Kafka, Felix Weltsch and Brod himself. Brod soon noticed that, although Kafka was shy and seldom spoke, what he said was usually profound. Kafka was an avid reader throughout his life; together he and Brod read Plato's Protagoras in the original Greek, on Brod's initiative, and Gustave Flaubert's L'éducation sentimentale and La Tentation de St. Antoine (The Temptation of Saint Anthony) in French, at his own suggestion. Kafka considered Fyodor Dostoevsky, Flaubert, Nikolai Gogol, Franz Grillparzer, and Heinrich von Kleist to be his "true blood brothers". Besides these, he took an interest in Czech literature and was also fond of the works of Johann Wolfgang von Goethe, though his "admiration for Goethe was, however, somewhat ambivalent: 'By the power of his works Goethe probably holds back the development of the German language.'" Kafka also admired the Swiss author Robert Walser, and Max Brod reported that Kafka would laugh hysterically while reading aloud from one of his favorite Walser short prose pieces, "Mountain Halls."

=== Employment ===
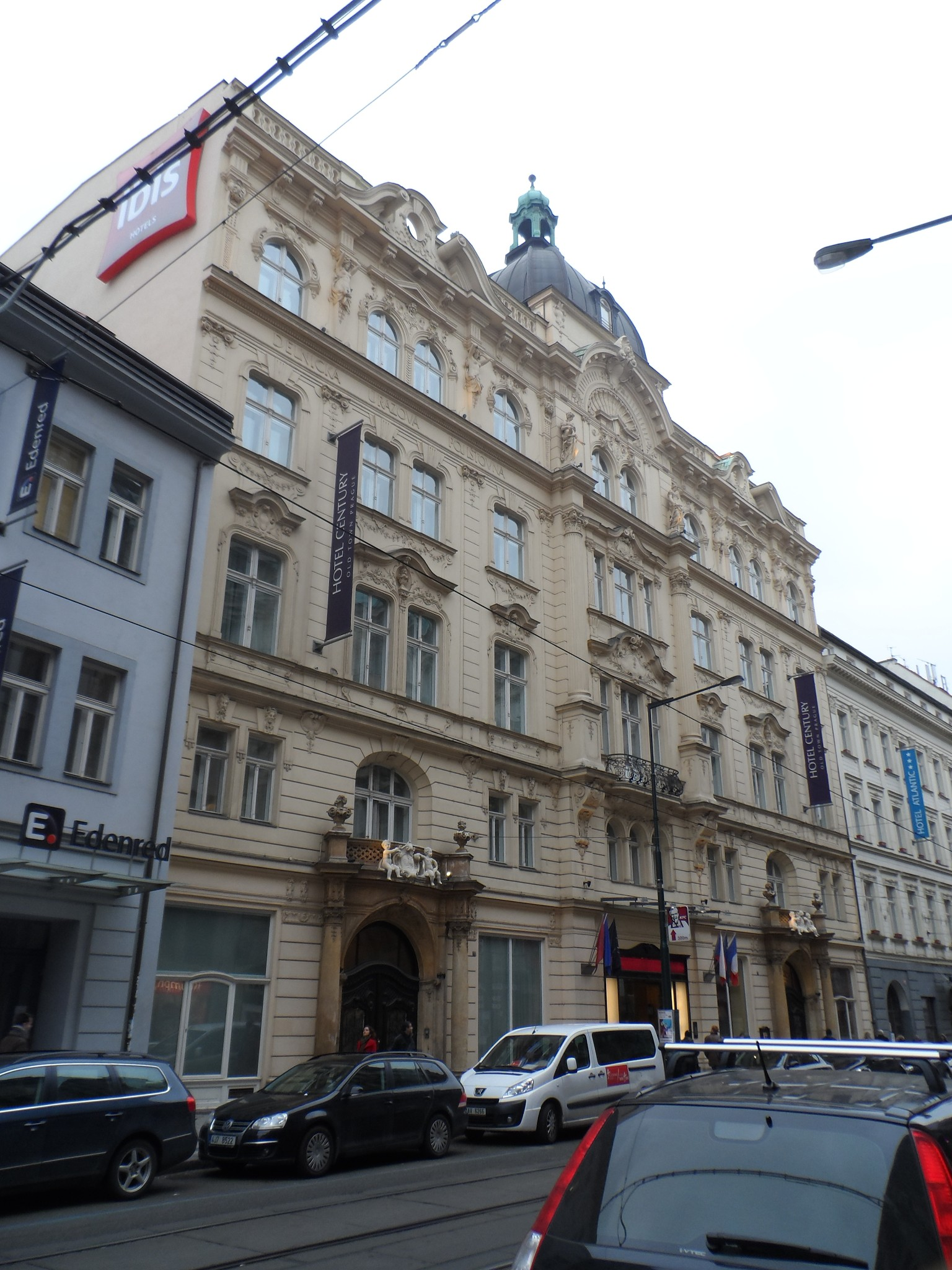
Former home of the Worker's Accident Insurance Institute

Kafka was awarded the degree of Doctor of Law on 18 June 1906 (Note: Records of the university list June as Kafka's graduation month, as do some secondary sources (Murray), while Brod lists July, possibly confusing the date with that of an exam three years earlier, on 18 July 1903.) and performed an obligatory year of unpaid service as a law clerk for the civil and criminal courts. On 1 November 1907, Kafka was employed at the Assicurazioni Generali, an insurance company, where he worked for nearly a year. His correspondence during that period indicates that he was unhappy with a work schedule—from 08:00 until 18:00—that made it extremely difficult to concentrate on writing, which was assuming increasing importance to him. On 15 July 1908, he resigned. Two weeks later, he found employment more amenable to writing when he joined the Worker's Accident Insurance Institute for the Kingdom of Bohemia (Úrazová pojišťovna dělnická pro Čechy v Praze). The job involved investigating and assessing compensation for personal injury to industrial workers; accidents such as lost fingers or limbs were commonplace, owing to poor work safety policies at the time. It was especially true of factories fitted with machine lathes, drills, planing machines and rotary saws, which were rarely fitted with safety guards.

His father often referred to his son's job as an insurance officer as a Brotberuf, literally "bread job", a job done only to pay the bills; Kafka often claimed to despise it. Kafka was rapidly promoted and his duties included processing and investigating compensation claims, writing reports, and handling appeals from businessmen who thought their firms had been placed in too high a risk category, which cost them more in insurance premiums. He would compile and compose the annual report on the insurance institute for the several years he worked there. The reports were well received by his superiors. Kafka usually got off work at 2 p.m., so that he had time to spend on his literary work, to which he was committed. Kafka's father also expected him to help out at and take over the family fancy goods store. In his later years, Kafka's illness often prevented him from working at the insurance bureau and at his writing.

In late 1911, Elli's husband Karl Hermann and Kafka became partners in the first asbestos factory in Prague, known as Prager Asbestwerke Hermann & Co., having used dowry money from Hermann Kafka. Kafka showed a positive attitude at first, dedicating much of his free time to the business, but he later resented the encroachment of this work on his writing time. During that period, he also found interest and entertainment in the performances of Yiddish theatre. After seeing a Yiddish theatre troupe perform in October 1911, for the next six months Kafka "immersed himself in Yiddish language and in Yiddish literature". This interest also served as a starting point for his growing exploration of Judaism. It was at about this time that Kafka became a vegetarian. Around 1915, Kafka received his draft notice for military service in World War I, but his employers at the insurance institute arranged for a deferment because his work was considered essential government service. He later attempted to join the military but was prevented from doing so by medical problems associated with tuberculosis, with which he was diagnosed in 1917. In 1918, the Worker's Accident Insurance Institute put Kafka on a pension due to his illness, for which there was no cure at the time, and he spent most of the rest of his life in sanatoriums.

=== Personal life ===
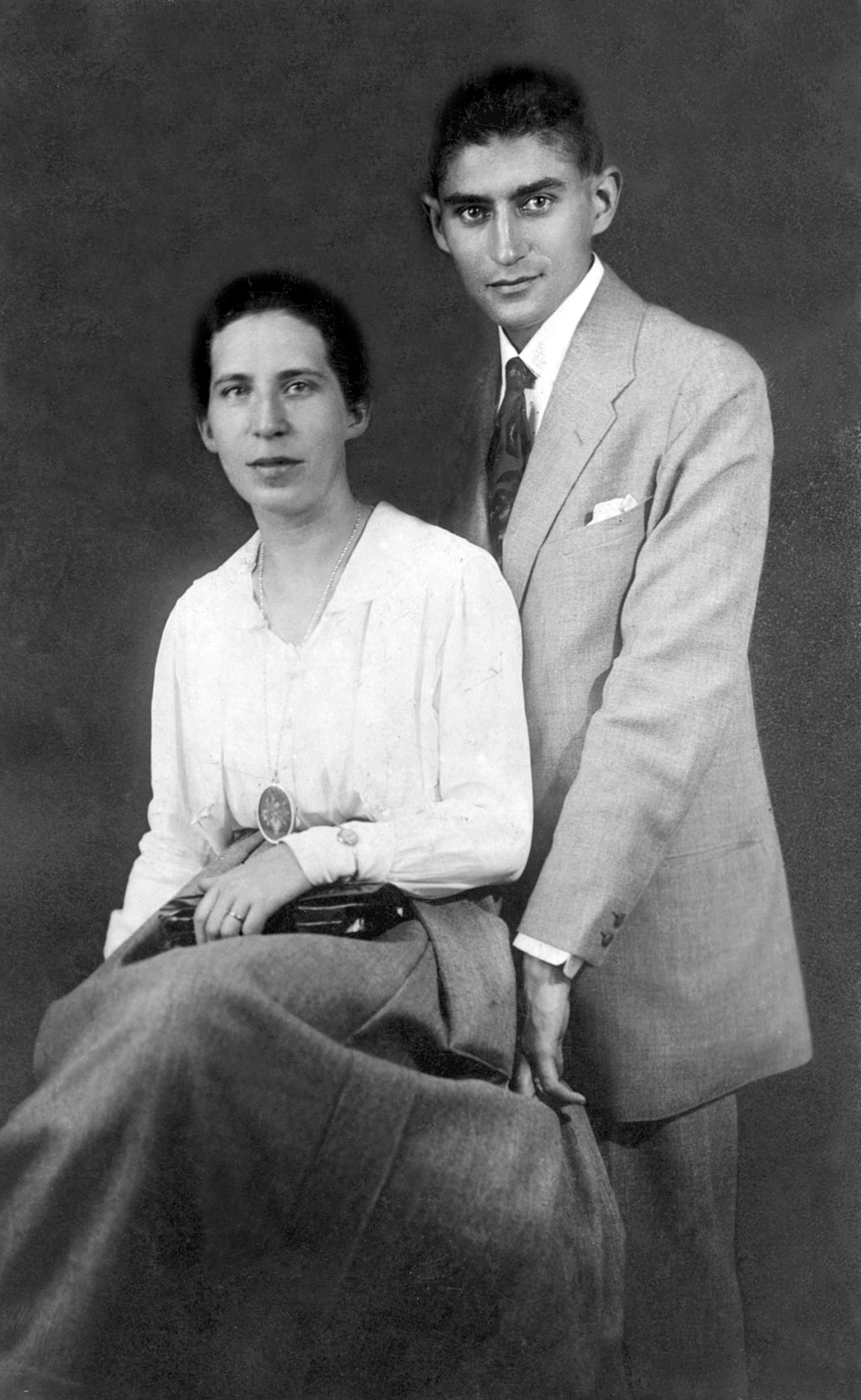
Felice Bauer and Franz Kafka

Kafka never married. According to Brod, Kafka was "tortured" by sexual desire and filled with a fear of "sexual failure". Kafka visited brothels for most of his adult life, and his collection of erotica and pornographic photographs demonstrates a connoisseur's range of interest in the genre. In addition, he had close relationships with several women during his lifetime. On 13 August 1912, Kafka met Felice Bauer, a relative of Brod's, who worked in Berlin as a representative of a dictaphone company. A week after the meeting at Brod's home, Kafka wrote in his diary:

Miss FB. When I arrived at Brod's on 13 August, she was sitting at the table. I was not at all curious about who she was, but rather took her for granted at once. Bony, empty face that wore its emptiness openly. Bare throat. A blouse thrown on. Looked very domestic in her dress although, as it turned out, she by no means was. (I alienate myself from her a little by inspecting her so closely…) Almost broken nose. Blonde, somewhat straight, unattractive hair, strong chin. As I was taking my seat I looked at her closely for the first time, by the time I was seated I already had an unshakeable opinion.

Shortly after this meeting, Kafka wrote the story "Das Urteil" ("The Judgment") in only one night and in a productive period worked on Der Verschollene (The Man Who Disappeared) and Die Verwandlung (The Metamorphosis). Kafka and Felice Bauer communicated mostly through letters over the next five years, met occasionally, and were engaged twice. Kafka's extant letters to Bauer were published as Briefe an Felice (Letters to Felice); her letters did not survive. After he had written to Bauer's father asking to marry her, Kafka wrote in his diary:

My job is unbearable to me because it conflicts with my only desire and my only calling, which is literature… I am nothing but literature and can and want to be nothing else.... Nervous states of the worst sort control me without pause… A marriage could not change me, just as my job cannot change me.

According to the biographers Stach and James Hawes, Kafka became engaged a third time around 1920, to Julie Wohryzek, a poor and uneducated hotel chambermaid. Kafka's father objected to Wohryzek because of her Zionist beliefs. Although Kafka and Wohryzek rented a flat and set a wedding date, the marriage never took place. During this time, Kafka began a draft of Letter to His Father. Before the date of the intended marriage, he took up with yet another woman.

Stach and Brod state that during the time that Kafka knew Felice Bauer, he had an affair with a friend of hers, Margarethe "Grete" Bloch, a Jewish woman from Berlin. Brod says that Bloch gave birth to Kafka's son, although Kafka never knew about the child. The boy, whose name is not known, was born in 1914 or 1915 and died in Munich in 1921. However, Kafka's biographer Peter-André Alt says that, while Bloch had a son, Kafka was not the father, as the pair were never intimate. Stach notes contradictory evidence as to whether Kafka was the father.

Kafka was diagnosed with tuberculosis in August 1917 and moved for a few months to the Bohemian village of Zürau (Siřem in Czech), where his sister Ottla worked on the farm of her brother-in-law Karl Hermann. He felt comfortable there and later described this time as perhaps the best period of his life, probably because he had no responsibilities. He kept diaries and made notes in exercise books (Oktavhefte). From those notes, Kafka extracted 109 numbered pieces of text on single pieces of paper (Zettel); these were later published as Die Zürauer Aphorismen oder Betrachtungen über Sünde, Hoffnung, Leid und den wahren Weg (The Zürau Aphorisms or Reflections on Sin, Hope, Suffering, and the True Way).

In 1920, Kafka began an intense relationship with Milena Jesenská, a Czech journalist and writer who was non-Jewish and who was married, but whose marriage, when she met Kafka, was a "sham". His letters to her were later published as Briefe an Milena. During a vacation in July 1923 to Graal-Müritz on the Baltic Sea, Kafka met Dora Diamant, a 25-year-old kindergarten teacher from an orthodox Jewish family. Kafka, hoping to escape the influence of his family to concentrate on his writing, moved briefly to Berlin (September 1923-March 1924) and lived with Diamant. She became his lover and reignited his interest in the Talmud. He completed four stories, which were published shortly after his death under the title of one of them, Ein Hungerkünstler (A Hunger Artist).

=== Siblings ===
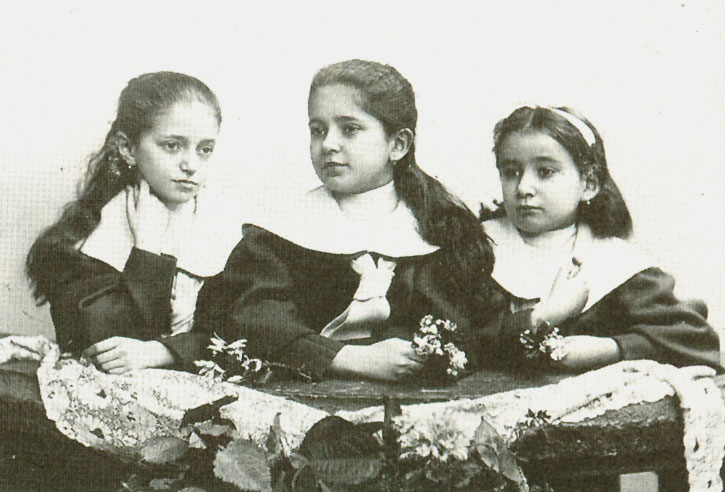
Franz Kafka's sisters as children, from the left Valli, Elli, Ottla

Kafka's parents had six children; Franz was the eldest. His two brothers, Georg and Heinrich, died in infancy; his three sisters, Gabriele ("Elli") (22 September 1889 – fall of 1942), Valerie ("Valli") (1890–1942) and Ottilie ("Ottla") (1892–1943), are believed to have been murdered in the Holocaust of the Second World War. Ottilie was Kafka's favourite sister.

Gabriele was Kafka's eldest sister. She was known as Elli or Ellie; her married name is variously rendered as Hermann or Hermannová. She attended a German girls' school in Prague's Řeznická Street and later a private girls' secondary school. She married Karl Hermann (1883–1939), a salesman, in 1910. The couple had a son, Felix (1911–1940), and two daughters, Gertrude (Gerti) Kaufmann (1912–1972), and Hanna Seidner (1920–1941). After her marriage to Hermann, she became closer to her brother, whose letters showed an active interest in the upbringing and education of her children. He accompanied her on a 1915 trip to Hungary to visit Hermann, who was stationed there, and spent a summer with her and her children in Müritz the year before he died.

With the outbreak of the Great Depression in 1929, the Hermann family business experienced financial difficulties and eventually went bankrupt. Karl Hermann died 27 February 1939, and Elli was supported financially by her sisters. On 21 October 1941, she was deported together with her daughter Hanna to the Łódź Ghetto, where she lived temporarily with her sister Valli and Valli's husband in the spring of 1942. She was probably killed in the Kulmhof extermination camp in the fall of 1942. Of Elli's three children, only her daughter Gerti survived the Second World War. A memorial plaque commemorates the three sisters at the family grave in the New Jewish Cemetery in Prague.

=== Personality ===
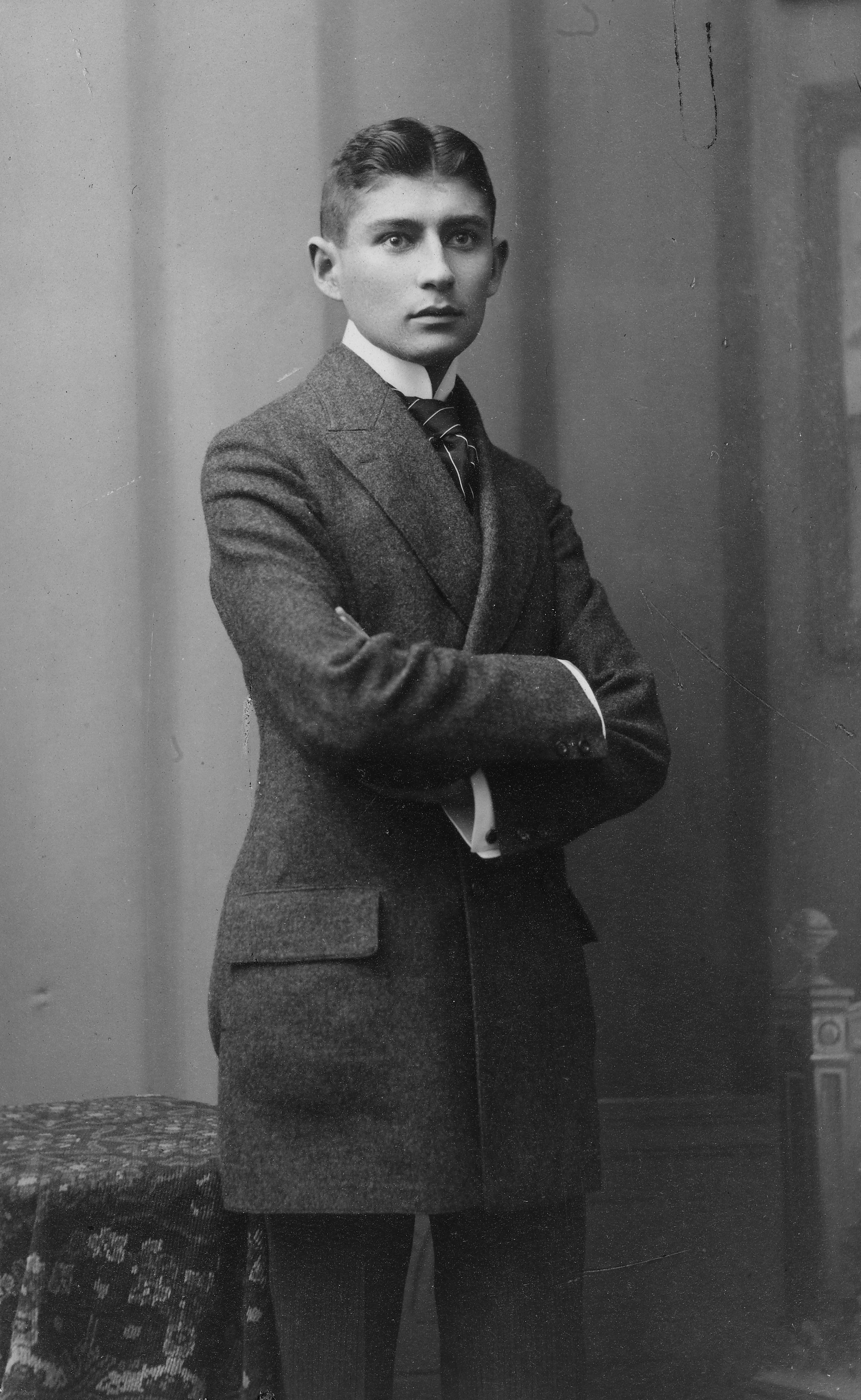
Kafka as a Doctor of Law, around 1906

Kafka had a lifelong suspicion that people found him mentally and physically repulsive. However, those who met him found him to possess a quiet and cool demeanor, obvious intelligence and a dry sense of humour; they also found him boyishly handsome, although of austere appearance. Kafka was thought to be "very self-analytic". Brod compared Kafka to Heinrich von Kleist, noting that both writers had the ability to describe a situation realistically with precise details. Brod thought Kafka was one of the most entertaining people he had met; Kafka enjoyed sharing his humour with his friends but also helped them in difficult situations with good advice. According to Brod, he was a passionate reciter, able to phrase his speech as though it were music. Brod felt that two of Kafka's most distinguishing traits were "absolute truthfulness" (absolute Wahrhaftigkeit) and "precise conscientiousness" (präzise Gewissenhaftigkeit). He explored inconspicuous details in depth and with such precision and love that unforeseen things surfaced that seemed strange but absolutely true (nichts als wahr).

Kafka's letters and unexpurgated diaries reveal homoerotic themes, including a scenario with novelist Franz Werfel and references to the work of Hans Blüher on male bonding. Saul Friedländer argues that this mental struggle may have informed the themes of alienation and psychological brutality in his writing.

Although Kafka showed little interest in exercise as a child, he later developed a passion for games and physical activity and was an accomplished rider, swimmer, and rower. On weekends, he and his friends embarked on long hikes, often planned by Kafka himself. His other interests included alternative medicine, modern education systems such as Montessori, and technological novelties such as airplanes and film. Writing was vitally important to Kafka; he considered it a "form of prayer". He was highly sensitive to noise and preferred absolute quiet when writing. Kafka was also a vegetarian and did not drink alcohol.

Pérez-Álvarez has claimed that Kafka had symptomatology consistent with schizoid personality disorder. His style, it is claimed, not only in Die Verwandlung (The Metamorphosis) but in other writings, appears to show low- to medium-level schizoid traits, which Pérez-Álvarez claims influenced much of Kafka's work. His anguish can be seen in this diary entry from 21 June 1913:

Die ungeheure Welt, die ich im Kopfe habe. Aber wie mich befreien und sie befreien, ohne zu zerreißen. Und tausendmal lieber zerreißen, als in mir sie zurückhalten oder begraben. Dazu bin ich ja hier, das ist mir ganz klar.
The tremendous world I have inside my head, but how to free myself and free it without being torn to pieces. And a thousand times rather be torn to pieces than retain it in me or bury it. That, indeed, is why I am here, that is quite clear to me.

and in Zürau Aphorism number 50:

Der Mensch kann nicht leben ohne ein dauerndes Vertrauen zu etwas Unzerstörbarem in sich, wobei sowohl das Unzerstörbare als auch das Vertrauen ihm dauernd verborgen bleiben können.
Man cannot live without a permanent trust in something indestructible within himself, though both that indestructible something and his own trust in it may remain permanently concealed from him.

The Italian medical researchers Alessia Coralli and Antonio Perciaccante have posited in a 2016 article that Kafka may have had borderline personality disorder with co-occurring psychophysiological insomnia. Joan Lachkar interpreted Die Verwandlung as "a vivid depiction of the borderline personality" and described the story as "model for Kafka's own abandonment fears, anxiety, depression, and parasitic dependency needs. Kafka illuminated the borderline's general confusion of normal and healthy desires, wishes, and needs with something ugly and disdainful".

Though Kafka never married, he held marriage and children in high esteem. He had several girlfriends and lovers during his life. He may have suffered from an eating disorder. Doctor Manfred M. Fichter of the Psychiatric Clinic at Ludwig-Maximilians-Universität München presented "evidence for the hypothesis that the writer Franz Kafka had suffered from an atypical anorexia nervosa", and that Kafka was not just lonely and depressed but also "occasionally suicidal". In his 1995 book Franz Kafka, the Jewish Patient, Sander Gilman investigated contemporaneous views about "why a Jew might have been considered 'hypochondriacal' or 'homosexual' and how Kafka incorporates aspects of these ways of understanding the Jewish male into his own self-image and writing". Kafka considered suicide at least once, in late 1912.

=== Political views ===
Before World War I, Kafka attended several meetings of the Klub mladých, a Czech anarchist, anti-militarist, and anti-clerical organization. Hugo Bergmann, who attended the same elementary and high schools as Kafka, fell out with Kafka during their last academic year (1900–1901) because "[Kafka's] socialism and my Zionism were much too strident". Bergmann said: "Franz became a socialist, I became a Zionist in 1898. The synthesis of Zionism and socialism did not yet exist." Bergmann claims that Kafka wore a red carnation to school to show his support for socialism. In one diary entry, Kafka referred to the influential anarchist philosopher Peter Kropotkin: "Don't forget Kropotkin!"

During the Communist era, the legacy of Kafka's work for Eastern Bloc socialism was hotly debated. Opinions ranged from the notion that he satirised the bureaucratic bungling of a crumbling Austro-Hungarian Empire to the belief that he embodied the rise of socialism. Another question was Kafka's relationship to Marx's theory of alienation. While the orthodox position was that Kafka's depictions of alienation were no longer relevant for a society that had supposedly eliminated alienation, a 1963 conference held in Liblice, Czechoslovakia, on the eightieth anniversary of Kafka's birth, reassessed the importance of Kafka's portrayal of bureaucracy.

=== Judaism and Zionism ===
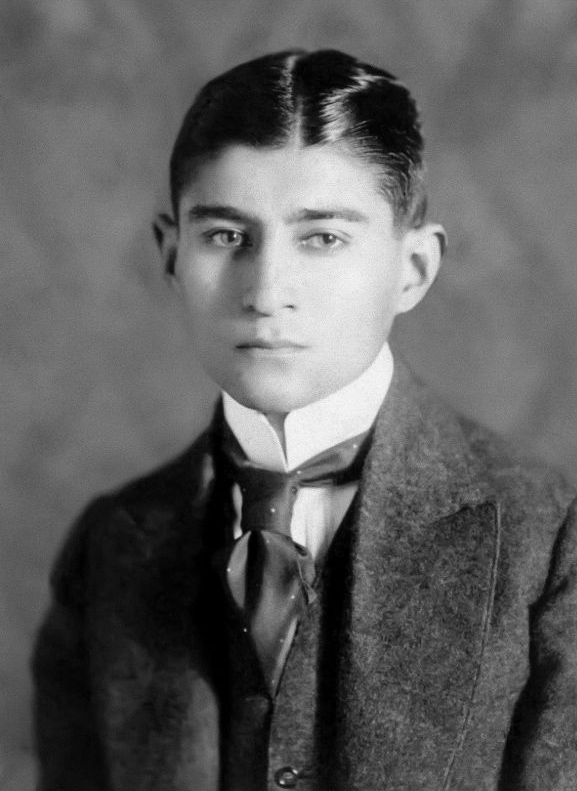
Kafka in 1910

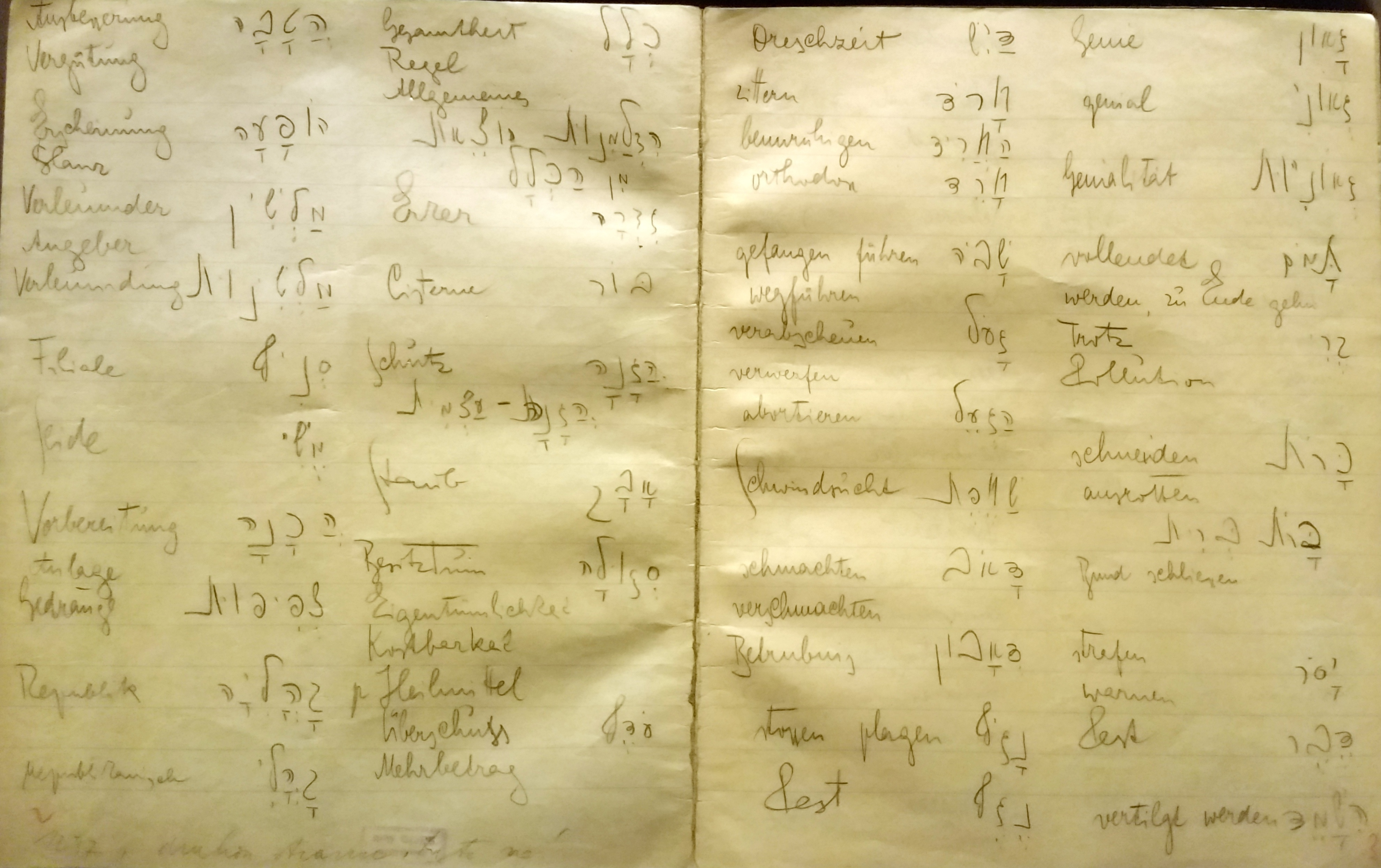
Kafka's notebook with his studies of Hebrew

Kafka grew up in Prague as a German-speaking Jew. He was deeply fascinated by the Jews of Eastern Europe, who he thought possessed an intensity of spiritual life that was absent from Jews in the West. His diary contains many references to Yiddish writers. Yet he was at times alienated from Judaism and Jewish life. On 8 January 1914, he wrote in his diary:

Was habe ich mit Juden gemeinsam? Ich habe kaum etwas mit mir gemeinsam und sollte mich ganz still, zufrieden damit daß ich atmen kann, in einen Winkel stellen.
What have I in common with Jews? I have hardly anything in common with myself and should stand very quietly in a corner, content that I can breathe.

As a teenager, Kafka declared himself an atheist. Issues such as Judaism, the Talmud, the Zohar, and the Kabbalah remain a theme in his diaries. He notes in his diary, shortly before embarking on his composition of The Castle, that in the demonic onslaught of visions assaulting him he perceives "the intimations of a secret doctrine, a new Kabbalah" whose development has been barred by Zionism.

In the final issue of Die Sammlung, a journal for exiles from the Third Reich in Western Europe, Klaus Mann writes, "[T]he collected works of Kafka, offered by the Schocken Verlag in Berlin, are the noblest and most significant publications that have come out of Germany. [Kafka contributes] the epoch's purest and most singular works of literature… [T]his spiritual event has occurred within a splendid isolation, in a ghetto far from the German cultural ministry."

In 1935, as the Nazi Race Laws were being promulgated and prepared for their introduction at that year's Nuremberg Rally, the word ghetto bore the same connotation it carried since the early 17th century: 'a part of the city where Jews were compelled to live'. Mann's mention of the ghetto here is an allusion to Kafka's status as a Jewish writer, and a swipe at Hitler's antisemitic policies. Very likely as a result of this message, the German cultural ministry sent a cease-and-desist letter to Schocken, reminding the publisher that Kafka's name had been placed on the Third Reich's index librorum prohibitorum several weeks earlier.

That same year, a Rabbi of the Bar Kochba Youth Movement in Prague, Martin Buber, wrote to Brod (the editor of Kafka's Werke) that these stories were "a great possession, that could show how one can live marginally with complete integrity and without loss of background". First published in Buber's Der Jude in 1917, Kafka's story "Jackals and Arabs" is an illustration of the tendency that Buber describes in this letter: Arabs are called Arabs, elsewhere Chinese may be directly referred to as people from China, but in this case references to Jews are zoomorphic, as elsewhere, and in other places Jewish characters are simply not named as such.

Benjamin remarks that Kafka's world is pre-animistic (as opposed to the dualism of later religions)—implying a universal and primordial ur-phenomenology (prior to the distinction of the spiritual and the substantial in human perception) that emerges as a hallmark of Kafka's style. But in the same essay, Benjamin includes a parable of an obviously Chasidic character to describe Kafka's work, and in his correspondence attached to this essay he refers to Kafka's stories as a haggadic (referring to stories in the Talmud) uprising against halakha (referring to legal doctrine). Arendt echoes and expands on Benjamin's larger sentiment (which at that time was still a novelty in Kafka criticism), repeating the injunction that it is a mistake to refer to Kafka as a particularly Jewish or religious figure. Arendt's article, which appeared in the Partisan Review in 1944, was a sequel to Benjamin's earlier piece in many respects. Arendt was a close confidant of Benjamin's and worked as an editor-at-large in Paris for Schocken Books in the late 1930s, when it published the final volumes of Kafka's works. Arendt was also employed by various Zionist associations devoted to facilitating the emigration of Jewish children to Palestine so that they could escape the Third Reich. Arendt and Benjamin both emphasized that Kafka belongs to the whole world.

Hawes suggests that, though Kafka was conscious of his own Jewishness, in his fiction he concealed that of his Jewish characters. In the opinion of literary critic Harold Bloom, although Kafka was uneasy with his Jewish heritage, he was the quintessential Jewish writer. Lothar Kahn is likewise unequivocal: "The presence of Jewishness in Kafka's oeuvre is no longer subject to doubt". Pavel Eisner, one of Kafka's first translators, interprets Der Process (The Trial) as the embodiment of the "triple dimension of Jewish existence in Prague… his protagonist Josef K. is (symbolically) arrested by a German (Rabensteiner), a Czech (Kullich), and a Jew (Kaminer). He stands for the 'guiltless guilt' that imbues the Jew in the modern world, although there is no evidence that he himself is a Jew".

In his essay Sadness in Palestine?!, Dan Miron explores Kafka's connection to Zionism: "It seems that those who claim that there was such a connection and that Zionism played a central role in his life and literary work, and those who deny the connection altogether or dismiss its importance, are both wrong. The truth lies in some very elusive place between these two simplistic poles." Kafka considered moving to Palestine with Felice Bauer, and later with Dora Diamant. He studied Hebrew while living in Berlin, hiring a friend of Brod's from Palestine, Pua Bat-Tovim, to tutor him and attending Rabbi Julius Grünthal and Rabbi Julius Guttmann's classes in the Berlin Hochschule für die Wissenschaft des Judentums (College for the Study of Judaism), where he also studied the Talmud.

Livia Rothkirchen calls Kafka the "symbolic figure of his era". His contemporaries included numerous Jewish, Czech, and German writers who were sensitive to Jewish, Czech, and German culture. According to Rothkirchen, "This situation lent their writings a broad cosmopolitan outlook and a quality of exaltation bordering on transcendental metaphysical contemplation. An illustrious example is Franz Kafka". Towards the end of his life, Kafka sent a postcard to his friend Hugo Bergmann in Tel Aviv, announcing his intention to emigrate to Palestine. Bergmann refused to host Kafka because he had young children and was afraid that Kafka would infect them with tuberculosis.

== Death ==
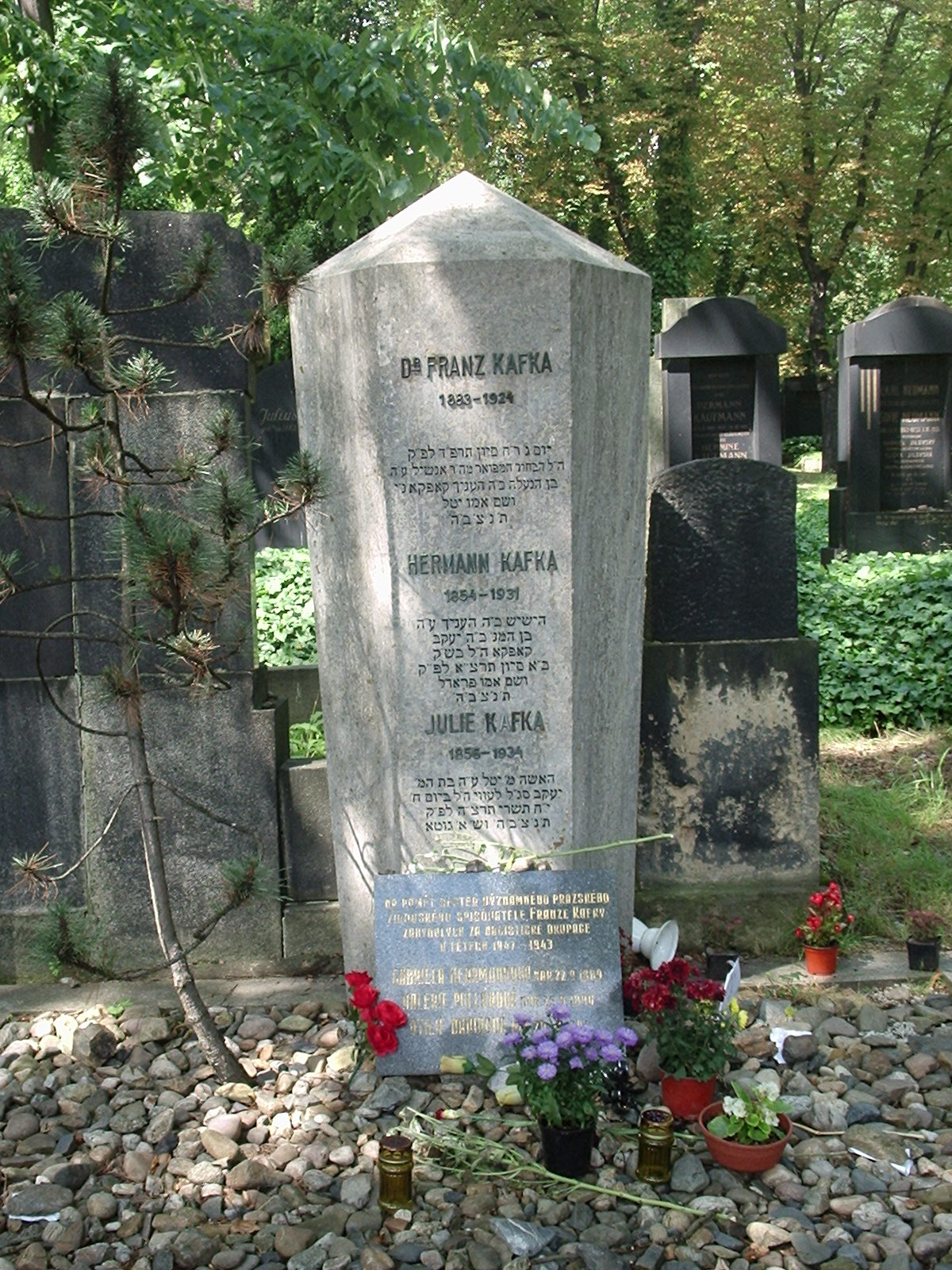
Franz Kafka's grave in Prague-Žižkov designed by Leopold Ehrmann

Kafka's laryngeal tuberculosis worsened and in March 1924 he returned from Berlin to Prague, where members of his family, principally his sister Ottla, as well as Dora Diamant, took care of him. He went to Hugo Hoffmann's sanatorium in Kierling just outside Vienna for treatment on 10 April, and died there on 3 June 1924. The cause of death seemed to be starvation: the condition of Kafka's throat made eating too painful for him, and since parenteral nutrition had not yet been developed, there was no way to feed him.

Kafka was editing "A Hunger Artist" on his deathbed, a story whose composition he had begun before his throat closed to the point that he could not take any nourishment. His body was brought back to Prague where he was buried on 11 June 1924, in the New Jewish Cemetery in Prague-Žižkov. His obituary appeared in the Prager Presse and the Berliner Tageblatt. Kafka was virtually unknown during his own lifetime, but he did not consider fame important. He rose to fame rapidly after his death, particularly after World War II. The Kafka tombstone was designed by architect Leopold Ehrmann.

== Work ==
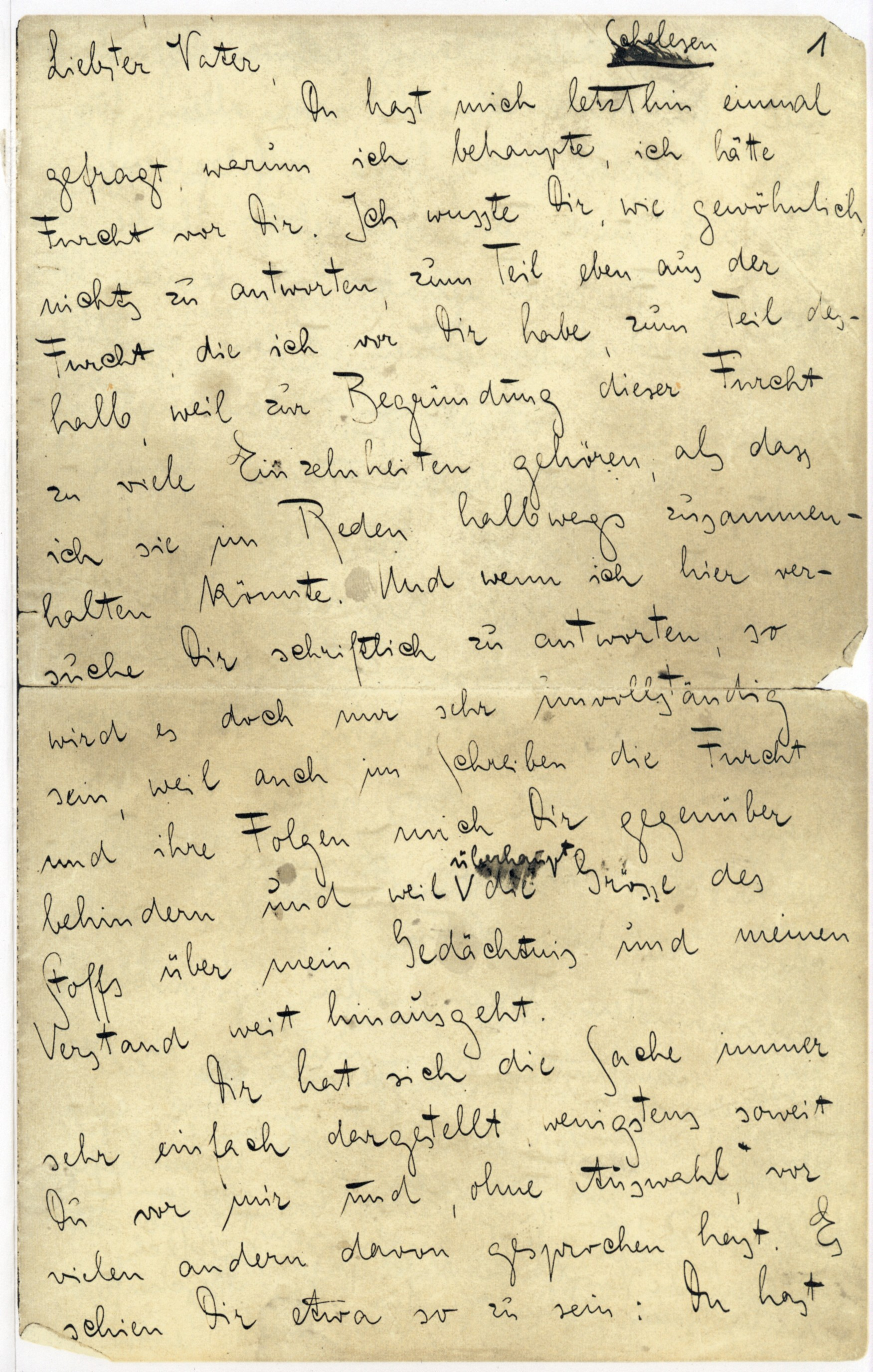
First page of Kafka's Letter to His Father

All of Kafka's published works were written in German. What little was published during his lifetime attracted scant public attention. Kafka finished none of his full-length novels and burned around 90 percent of his work, much of it during the period he lived in Berlin with Diamant, who helped him burn the drafts. In his early years as a writer he was influenced by von Kleist, whose work he described in a letter to Bauer as frightening and whom he considered closer than his own family. The first mention of Kafka's work was in an article by Max Brod on 9 February 1907 in the Berlin weekly Die Gegenwart, two years prior to his first publication. Brod would write about his friend again in 1921 in an essay entitled "Der Dichter Franz Kafka".

=== Stories ===
Kafka's earliest published works were eight stories that appeared in 1908 in the first issue of the literary journal Hyperion under the title Betrachtung (Contemplation). He wrote the story "Beschreibung eines Kampfes" ("Description of a Struggle") (Note: "Kampf" also translates to "fight".) in 1904; in 1905 he showed it to Brod, who advised him to continue writing and convinced him to submit it to Hyperion. Kafka published a fragment in 1908 and two sections in the spring of 1909, all in Munich.

In a creative outburst on the night of 22 September 1912, Kafka wrote the story "Das Urteil" ("The Judgment", literally "The Verdict") and dedicated it to Felice Bauer. Brod noted the similarity in names of the main character and his fictional fiancée, Georg Bendemann and Frieda Brandenfeld, to Franz Kafka and Felice Bauer. The story is often considered Kafka's breakthrough work. It deals with the troubled relationship of a son and his dominant father, facing a new situation after the son's engagement. Kafka later described writing it as "a complete opening of body and soul", a story that "evolved as a true birth, covered with filth and slime". The story was first published in Leipzig in 1912 and dedicated "to Miss Felice Bauer", and in subsequent editions "for F."

In 1912, Kafka wrote Die Verwandlung (The Metamorphosis, or The Transformation), published in 1915 in Leipzig. The story begins with a travelling salesman waking to find himself transformed into an ungeheures Ungeziefer, a monstrous vermin, Ungeziefer being a general term for unwanted and unclean pests, especially insects. Critics regard the work as one of the seminal works of fiction of the 20th century. The story "In der Strafkolonie" ("In the Penal Colony"), dealing with an elaborate torture and execution device, was written in October 1914, revised in 1918, and published in Leipzig during October 1919. The story "Ein Hungerkünstler" ("A Hunger Artist"), published in the periodical Die neue Rundschau in 1924, describes a victimized protagonist who experiences a decline in the appreciation of his strange craft of starving himself for extended periods. His last story, "Josefine, die Sängerin oder Das Volk der Mäuse" ("Josephine the Singer, or the Mouse Folk"), also deals with the relationship between an artist and his audience.

=== Novels ===
Kafka began his first novel in 1912; its first chapter is the story "Der Heizer" ("The Stoker"). He called the work, which remained unfinished, Der Verschollene (The Man Who Disappeared or The Missing Person), but when Brod published it after Kafka's death he named it Amerika. The inspiration for the novel was the time Kafka spent in the audience of Yiddish theatre the previous year, bringing him to a new awareness of his heritage, which led to the thought that an innate appreciation for one's heritage lives deep within each person. More explicitly humorous and slightly more realistic than most of Kafka's works, the novel shares the motif of an oppressive and intangible system putting the protagonist repeatedly in bizarre situations. It uses many details of experiences from his relatives who had emigrated to America and is the only work for which Kafka considered an optimistic ending.

In 1914 Kafka began the novel Der Process (The Trial), the story of a man arrested and prosecuted by a remote, inaccessible authority, with the nature of his alleged crime revealed neither to him nor to the reader. He did not complete the novel, although he finished the final chapter. According to Nobel Prize-winning author Elias Canetti, Felice is central to the plot of Der Process and Kafka said it was "her story". Canetti titled his book on Kafka's letters to Felice Kafka's Other Trial, in recognition of the relationship between the letters and the novel. Michiko Kakutani notes in a review for The New York Times that Kafka's letters have the "earmarks of his fiction: the same nervous attention to minute particulars; the same paranoid awareness of shifting balances of power; the same atmosphere of emotional suffocation—combined, surprisingly enough, with moments of boyish ardour and delight."

According to his diary, Kafka was already planning his novel Das Schloss (The Castle), by 11 June 1914, but he did not begin writing it until 27 January 1922. The protagonist is the Landvermesser (land surveyor) named K., who struggles for unknown reasons to gain access to the mysterious authorities of a castle who govern the village. Kafka intended to have the castle's authorities notify K. on his deathbed that his "legal claim to live in the village was not valid, yet, taking certain auxiliary circumstances into account, he was to be permitted to live and work there". Dark and at times surreal, the novel is focused on alienation, bureaucracy, the seemingly endless frustrations of man's attempts to stand against the system, and the futile and hopeless pursuit of an unattainable goal. Hartmut M. Rastalsky noted in his thesis, "Like dreams, his texts combine precise 'realistic' detail with absurdity, careful observation and reasoning on the part of the protagonists with inexplicable obliviousness and carelessness."

=== Drawings ===
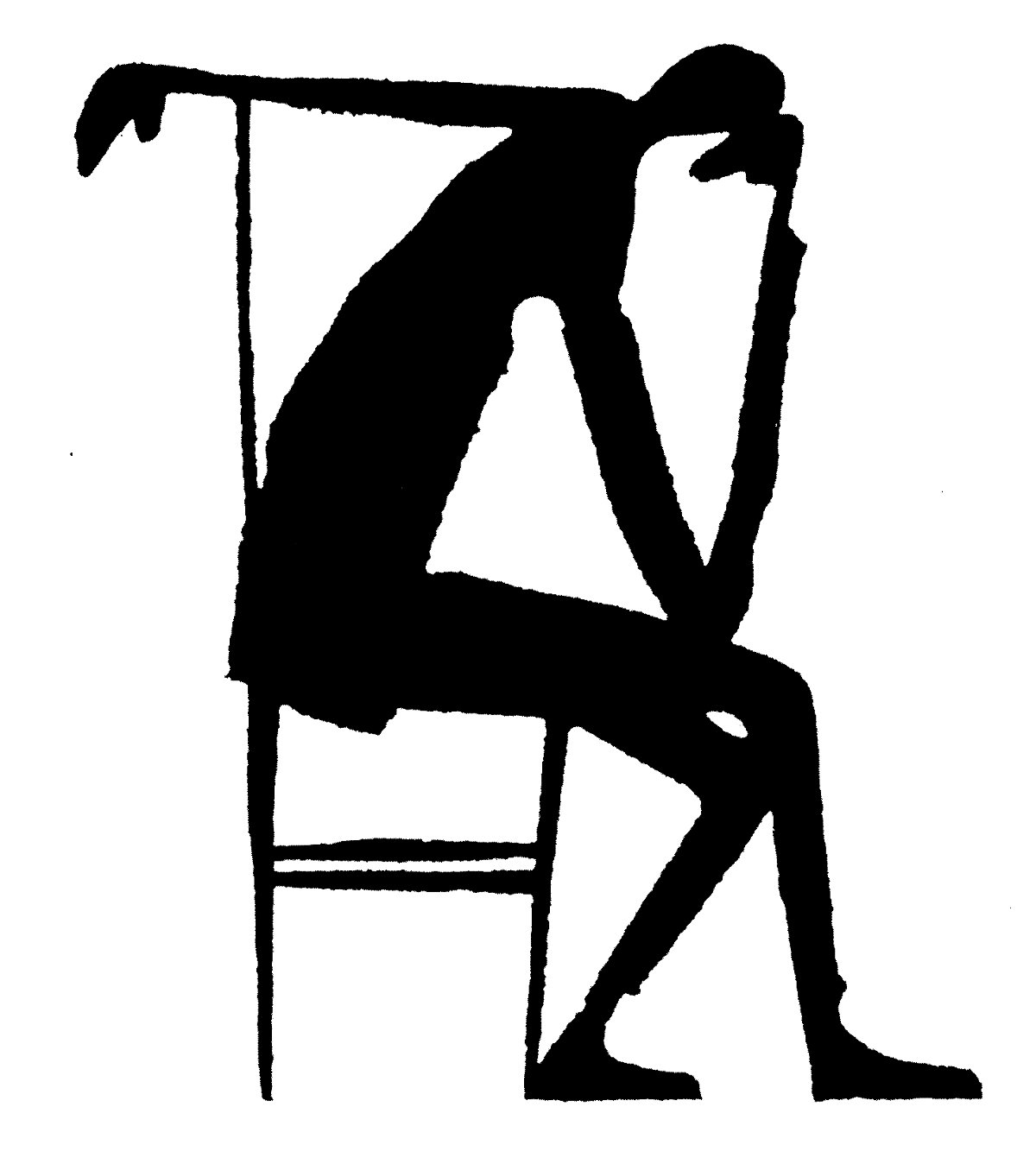
Der Denker, by Franz Kafka

Kafka drew and sketched extensively. His interest in art grew from 1901 to 1906. He "practiced drawing, took drawing classes, attended art history lectures, and sought to establish a connection to Prague's artistic circles". According to Max Brod, Kafka "was even more indifferent, or perhaps better, more hostile to his drawings than he was to his literary production". As he did with his writings, Kafka asked in his testament for his drawings to be destroyed. Brod preserved all of Kafka's drawings that Kafka gave him or that he could rescue from the wastebasket or otherwise, but "[a]nything that I didn't rescue was destroyed". Until May 2021, only about 40 of his drawings were known. In 2022, Yale University Press published Franz Kafka: The Drawings. The book brought to light about 150 sketches by Kafka.

=== Publishing history ===
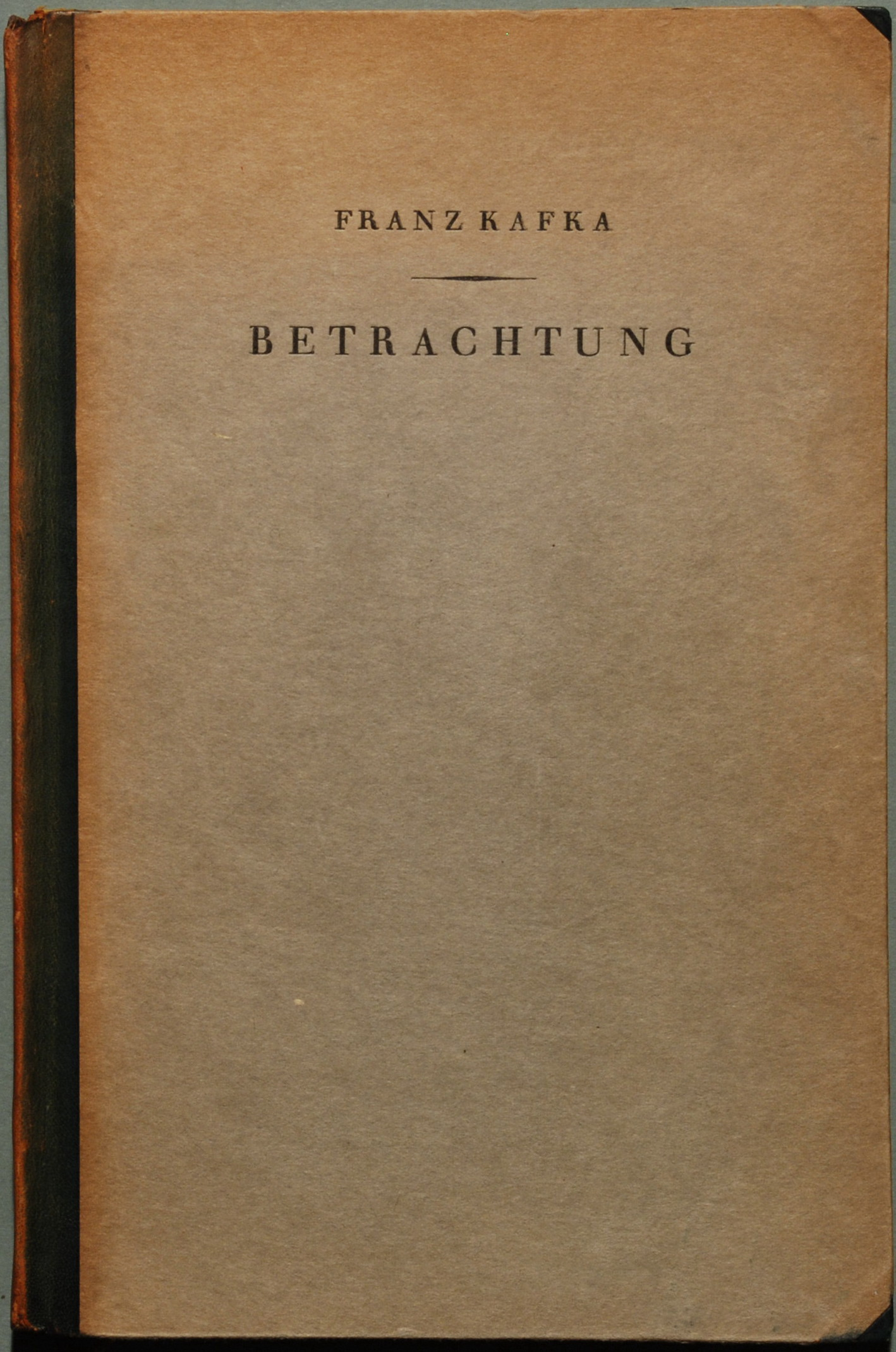
First edition of Betrachtung, 1912

Kafka's stories were initially published in literary periodicals. His first eight were printed in 1908 in the first issue of the bi-monthly Hyperion. Franz Blei published two dialogues in 1909 which became part of "Beschreibung eines Kampfes" ("Description of a Struggle"). A fragment of the story "Die Aeroplane in Brescia" ("The Aeroplanes at Brescia"), written on a trip to Italy with Brod, appeared in the daily Bohemia on 28 September 1909. On 27 March 1910, several stories that later became part of the book Betrachtung (Contemplation or Meditation) were published in the Easter edition of Bohemia. In Leipzig during 1913, Brod and publisher Kurt Wolff included "Das Urteil. Eine Geschichte von Franz Kafka." ("The Judgment. A Story by Franz Kafka.") in their literary yearbook for the art poetry Arkadia. In the same year, Wolff published "Der Heizer" ("The Stoker") in the Jüngste Tag series, where it enjoyed three printings. The story "Vor dem Gesetz" ("Before the Law") was published in the 1915 New Year's edition of the independent Jewish weekly Selbstwehr; it was reprinted in 1919 as part of the story collection Ein Landarzt (A Country Doctor) and became part of the novel Der Process. Other stories were published in various publications, including Martin Buber's Der Jude, the paper Prager Tagblatt, and the periodicals Die neue Rundschau, Genius, and Prager Presse.

Kafka's first published book, Betrachtung (Contemplation or Meditation), was a collection of 18 stories written between 1904 and 1912. On a summer trip to Weimar, Brod initiated a meeting between Kafka and Kurt Wolff; Wolff published Betrachtung in the Rowohlt Verlag at the end of 1912 (with the year given as 1913). Kafka dedicated it to Brod, "Für M.B.", and added in the personal copy given to his friend "So wie es hier schon gedruckt ist, für meinen liebsten Max‍—‌Franz K." ("As it is already printed here, for my dearest Max").

Kafka's novella Die Verwandlung (The Metamorphosis) was first printed in the October 1915 issue of Die Weißen Blätter, a monthly edition of expressionist literature, edited by René Schickele. Another story collection, Ein Landarzt (A Country Doctor), was published by Kurt Wolff in 1919, dedicated to Kafka's father. Kafka prepared a final collection of four stories for print, Ein Hungerkünstler (A Hunger Artist), which appeared in 1924 after his death, in Verlag Die Schmiede. On 20 April 1924, the Berliner Börsen-Courier published Kafka's essay on Adalbert Stifter.

==== Max Brod ====
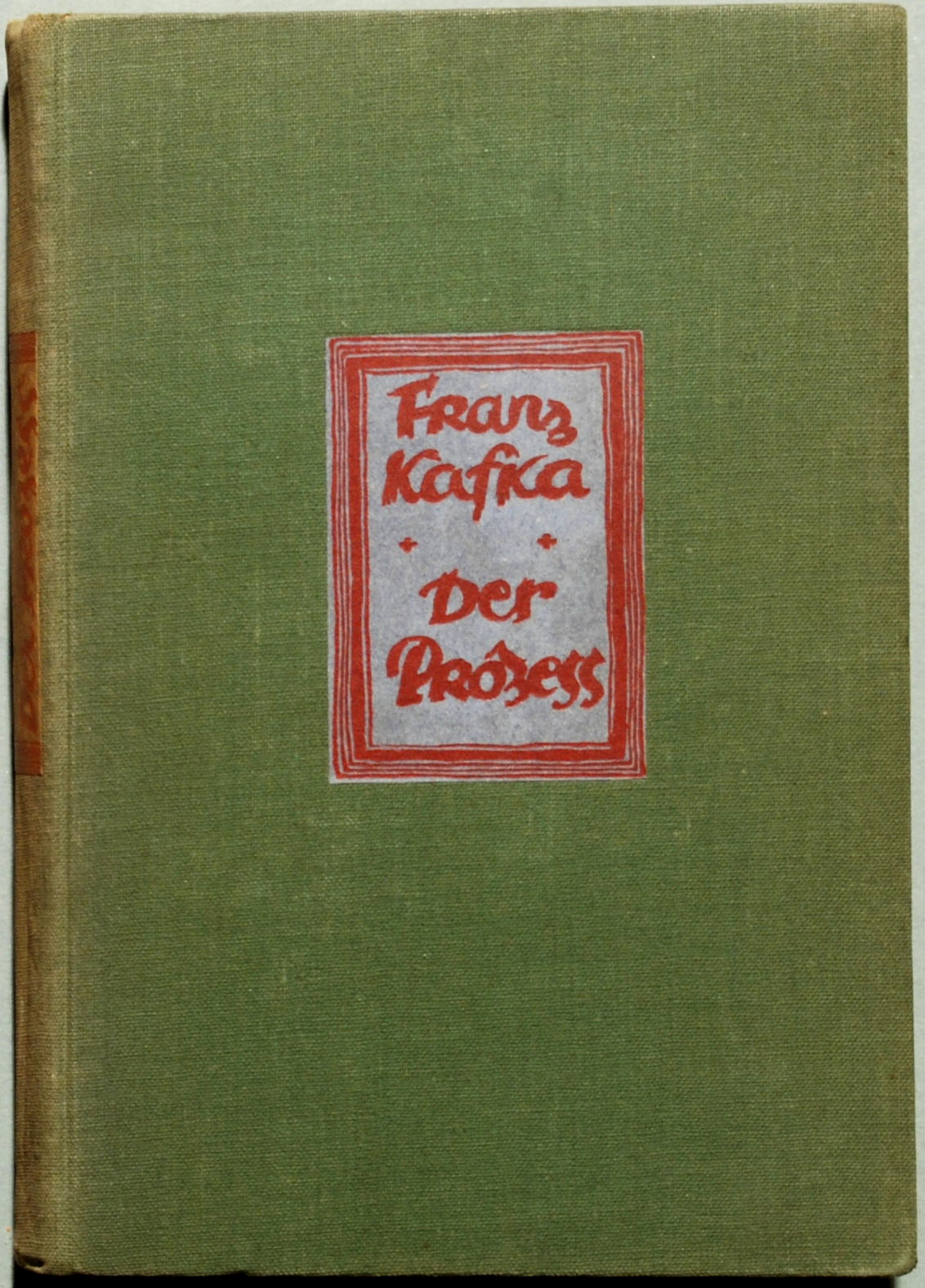
First edition of Der Process, 1925

At the time of his death, Kafka's works were probably known only to a small circle of Czech and German writers. Kafka left his work, both published and unpublished, to his friend and literary executor Max Brod with explicit instructions that it should be destroyed on Kafka's death; Kafka wrote: "Dearest Max, my last request: Everything I leave behind me ... in the way of diaries, manuscripts, letters (my own and others'), sketches, and so on, [is] to be burned unread." Brod ignored this request and published the novels and collected works between 1925 and 1935. Brod defended his action by claiming that he had told Kafka, "I shall not carry out your wishes", and that "Franz should have appointed another executor if he had been absolutely determined that his instructions should stand".

Brod took many of Kafka's papers, which remain unpublished, with him in suitcases to Palestine when he fled there in 1939. Kafka's last lover, Dora Diamant (later, Dymant-Lask), also ignored his wishes, secretly keeping 20 notebooks and 35 letters. These were confiscated by the Gestapo in 1933, but scholars continue to search for them.

As Brod published the bulk of the writings in his possession, Kafka's work began to attract wider attention and critical acclaim. Brod found it difficult to arrange Kafka's notebooks in chronological order. One problem was that Kafka often began writing in different parts of the book; sometimes in the middle, sometimes working backwards from the end. Brod finished many of Kafka's incomplete works for publication. For example, Kafka left Der Process with unnumbered and incomplete chapters and Das Schloss with incomplete sentences and ambiguous content; Brod rearranged chapters, copy-edited the text, and changed the punctuation. Der Process appeared in 1925 in Verlag Die Schmiede. Kurt Wolff published two other novels, Das Schloss in 1926 and Amerika in 1927. In 1931, Brod edited a collection of prose and unpublished stories as The Great Wall of China, including the titular short story "The Great Wall of China". The book appeared in the Gustav Kiepenheuer Verlag. Brod's sets are usually called the "Definitive Editions".

==== Modern editions ====
In 1961 Malcolm Pasley acquired for the Oxford Bodleian Library most of Kafka's original handwritten works. The text for Der Process was later purchased through auction and is stored at the German Literary Archives in Marbach am Neckar, Germany. Subsequently, Pasley headed a team (including Gerhard Neumann, Jost Schillemeit and Jürgen Born) which reconstructed the German novels; S. Fischer Verlag republished them. Pasley was the editor for Das Schloss, published in 1982, and Der Process (The Trial), published in 1990. Jost Schillemeit was the editor of Der Verschollene (Amerika) published in 1983. These are called the "Critical Editions" or the "Fischer Editions".

In 2023, the first unexpurgated edition of Kafka's diaries was published in English, "more than three decades after this complete text appeared in German. The sole previous English edition, with Brod's edits, was issued in the late 1940s". The new edition revealed that Brod had expunged homoerotic references, and negative comments about Eastern European Jews.

==== Unpublished papers ====
When Brod died in 1968, he left Kafka's unpublished papers, which are believed to number in the thousands, to his secretary Esther Hoffe. She released or sold some, but left most to her daughters, Eva and Ruth, who also refused to release the papers. A court battle began in 2008 between the sisters and the National Library of Israel, which claimed these works became the property of the nation of Israel when Brod emigrated to British Palestine in 1939. Esther Hoffe sold the original manuscript of Der Process for US$2 million in 1988 to the German Literary Archive Museum of Modern Literature in Marbach am Neckar. A ruling by a Tel Aviv family court in 2010 held that the papers must be released and a few were, including a previously unknown story, but the legal battle continued. The Hoffes claim the papers are their personal property, while the National Library of Israel argues they are "cultural assets belonging to the Jewish people". The National Library also suggests that Brod bequeathed the papers to them in his will. The Tel Aviv Family Court ruled in October 2012, six months after Ruth's death, that the papers were the property of the National Library. The Israeli Supreme Court upheld the decision in December 2016.

== Critical response ==
=== After-death biographies and critiques ===
After Kafka's death, Rudolf Kayser wrote an article titled "Anmerkungen zu Franz Kafka" for the Neue Rundschau, and Manfred Sturmann wrote a biographical essay titled "Erinnerungen an Kafka" for the Allgemeine Zeitung. In 1935, Brod wrote a biography. "Since this work was written in German, however, it was not available to the majority of English critics".

From 1924 to 1927, Brod arranged for the publication of Kafka's three unfinished novels and otherwise promoted Kafka's works. During this period, many analytical essays were written about his work. In the late 1920s, 55 articles were written about Kafka's work, most of them reviews and references. Examples include Heinrich Jacob's "Kafka oder die Wahrhaftigkeit" for Der Feuerreiter in 1924 and Brod's "Infantilismus Kleist und Kafka" in 1927.

Kafka's work was translated to English in the 1930s, and American journals and magazines such as The New Yorker, The Nation and Athenaeum, The Nation, Scribners, New York Tribune, and The Bookman, wrote reviews about his books. The Castle was especially well reviewed. But afterwards, until 1937, only three articles were published.

At the same time, in Germany, in 1930 only four articles were published, and the following year saw eight articles. But in 1932, only one article was published, possibly because of the rise of the National Socialist party, as there was a strong antisemitic bias at a time. In Nazi Germany, between 1933 and 1937, only 11 articles about Kafka were published, mostly by Jews in periodicals such as Der Morgen, Frankfurter Zeitung, Jüdische Rundschau, and Hochland. From 1937 to 1939, no articles were published.

Kafka's writings began to receive greater critical acclaim when they were re-released amidst the imposition of the Nuremberg Racial Hygiene Laws in 1935 as a complete set by Schocken Books; however, distribution and broad awareness of these works was stymied by the Nazi regime. The final volumes of this set were released after Schocken was forced to relocate to Prague. The works became more famous in German-speaking countries after World War II, influencing German literature and literature elsewhere in the 1960s. A critical edition of Kafka's complete works, including parts that had been suppressed by Brod in the earlier Schocken collection, was released by S. Fischer Verlag in the final decades of the 20th century.

In 1937, The Trial was translated to English. Twelve reviews appeared in the United States, but the novel was reviewed 20 times in other languages, including in France and Brazil. The reviews were mixed, with The New York Times reviewer stating that "it is beyond me" but another reviewer stating that Kafka was "one of the most extraordinary writers of our time".

In the following year, Amerika was translated to English and generally well received by four English and two American reviewers. In the same year, Das Schloss was translated into French and received five reviews.

In 1939, Kafka's work was reviewed in many countries, including in the periodicals The Southern Review, The Kenyon Review and Expressionism in German Life. In 1940, The Southern Review published a religious interpretation of The Trial. In 1941, eleven reviews and articles were published, including "a doctor's dissertation at the University of Zürich" by Herbert Tauber, entitled "Franz Kafka, eine Deutung seiner Werke". Other countries whose writers showed interest in Kafka's work were Peru, Cuba, and Brazil.

In the first years of World War II, interest in Kafka's work diminished in the United States, with only two articles published. In 1943, four articles were published, with one that "criticized Kafka as a symbol of the social decadence which was responsible for the failure of the Weimar Republic". But in the following year, interest in his work increased again, with six articles published. As World War II drew to a close, interest in Kafka grew once again, with 16 articles appearing in various countries' periodicals, including Focus One, Quarterly Review of Literature, and Les Cahiers du Sud. Freudianism and the Literary Mind, by Frederick J. Hoffman, which discussed Kafka, was published in 1945. Many intellectuals grew interested on Kafka's work, with articles by Parker Tyler in Accent, Albert Camus in "Hope and the Absurd in the Work of Franz Kafka" in The Myth of Sisyphus and Other Essays, and Jean Wahl in Kierkegaard and Kafka, tying his work to existentialism. In 1946, 21 articles were published on Kafka's work.

=== Critical interpretations ===
The British-American poet W. H. Auden called Kafka "the Dante of the twentieth century"; the novelist Vladimir Nabokov placed him among the greatest writers of the 20th century. Gabriel García Márquez noted the reading of Kafka's The Metamorphosis showed him "that it was possible to write in a different way". A prominent theme of Kafka's work, first established in the short story "The Judgment", is father–son conflict: the guilt induced in the son is resolved through suffering and atonement. Other prominent themes and archetypes include alienation, physical and psychological brutality, characters on a terrifying quest, and mystical transformation.

Kafka's style had been compared to Kleist's as early as 1916, in a review of "Die Verwandlung" and "Der Heizer" by Oscar Walzel in Berliner Beiträge. Kafka's prose allows for varied interpretations, and critics have placed it into a variety of literary schools. Marxists, for example, have sharply disagreed over how to interpret Kafka's works. The hopelessness and absurdity common to his works are seen as emblematic of existentialism. Some of Kafka's books are influenced by the expressionist movement, though the majority of his literary output was associated with the experimental modernist genre. Kafka also touches on the theme of human conflict with bureaucracy. William Burrows claims that such work is centred on the concepts of struggle, pain, solitude, and the need for relationships. Others, such as Thomas Mann, see Kafka's work as a quest for God.

According to Gilles Deleuze and Félix Guattari, the themes of alienation and persecution, although present in Kafka's work, have been overemphasised by critics. They argue that Kafka's work is more deliberate and subversive—and more joyful—than it may first appear. They point out that focusing on the futility of Kafka's characters' struggles reveals Kafka's humour; he is not necessarily commenting on his own problems but rather is pointing out how people tend to invent problems. In his work, Kafka often creates malevolent, absurd worlds. Kafka translator Mark Harman writes, "When Kafka read his own work aloud to his friends he evidently brought covert humor to the surface even when his writing was at its bleakest." Max Brod, Harman adds, recollected that Kafka's friends "laughed quite immoderately" even when he read the first chapter of The Trial, despite its "fearful earnestness", and there were moments when Kafka himself laughed so much that "he couldn't read any further". The novelist Milan Kundera suggests that Kafka's surreal humour may have been an inversion of Dostoevsky's presentation of characters who are punished for a crime. In Kafka's The Trial, a character is punished even though he has committed no crime. Kundera believes that Kafka's inspirations for his characteristic situations came both from growing up in a patriarchal family and from living in a totalitarian state.

His writings have been seen as prophetic or premonitory of a totalitarian future. Attempts have been made to identify the influence of Kafka's legal background and the role of law in his fiction. Many interpretations identify the importance of the law in his work, in which the legal system is often oppressive. The law in Kafka's works, rather than representing any particular legal or political entity, is usually interpreted to represent a collection of anonymous, incomprehensible forces. These are hidden from the individual but control the lives of the people, who are innocent victims of systems beyond their control. Critics who support this absurdist interpretation cite instances where Kafka describes himself in conflict with an absurd universe, such as the following entry from his diary:

Enclosed in my own four walls, I found myself as an immigrant imprisoned in a foreign country;... I saw my family as strange aliens whose foreign customs, rites, and very language defied comprehension;... though I did not want it, they forced me to participate in their bizarre rituals;... I could not resist.

However, James Hawes argues that many of Kafka's descriptions of the legal proceedings in The Trial—metaphysical, absurd, bewildering and nightmarish as they might appear—are based on accurate and informed descriptions of German and Austrian criminal proceedings of the time, which were inquisitorial rather than adversarial. Although he worked in insurance, as a trained lawyer Kafka was "keenly aware of the legal debates of his day". In a 2009 publication that uses Kafka's office writings as its point of departure, Pothik Ghosh states that with Kafka, law "has no meaning outside its fact of being a pure force of domination and determination".

Kafka's work often refers to animals — "zoopoetics," in Jacques Derrida's term. Joachim Seyppel has noted that his stories contain "countless references to animals, human-animal comparisons, allusions to animal life, fables, and animal motifs; there are important works in which the human person has been transformed into an animal, or vice versa. There are hardly any stories in which Kafka did not include at least one significant reference to creatures of the animal kingdom". "Already in his earliest surviving correspondence, he uses animal figures to convey psychological insights, his favorite being the mole." In Kafka's work animals sometimes "occupy leading roles, as narrators and central characters", but there is a "comparative absence of named species in Kafka's fiction". Themes of his stories range from animal cruelty to entomophobia to animal training. Animals are often shown as "others" that suffer from human "animalesque" actions, with Kafka's ideas thus converging with ecocentrist and postcolonialist thoughts.

=== Translations ===
The first instance of Kafka being translated into English was in 1925, when William A. Drake published "A Report for an Academy" in the New York Herald Tribune. Eugene Jolas translated Kafka's "The Judgment" for the modernist journal transition in 1928. In 1930, Edwin and Willa Muir translated the first German edition of Das Schloss. This was published as The Castle by Secker & Warburg in England and Alfred A. Knopf in the United States. In the 1930s, Alberto Spaini translated The Process to Italian and Alexandre Vialatte translated it to French. A 1941 edition, including a homage by Thomas Mann, spurred a surge in Kafka's popularity in the United States during the late 1940s. The Muirs translated all shorter works that Kafka had seen fit to print, including The Metamorphosis in 1933; they were published by Schocken Books in 1948 as The Penal Colony: Stories and Short Pieces, including additionally The First Long Train Journey, written by Kafka and Brod; Kafka's "A Novel about Youth", a review of Felix Sternheim's Die Geschichte des jungen Oswald; his essay on Kleist's "Anecdotes"; his review of the literary magazine Hyperion; and an epilogue by Brod.

Later editions, notably those of 1954 (Dearest Father: Stories and Other Writings), included text, translated by Eithne Wilkins and Ernst Kaiser, that had been deleted by earlier publishers. Known as "Definitive Editions", they include translations of The Trial, Definitive, The Castle, Definitive, and other writings. These translations are generally accepted to have a number of biases and are considered to be dated in interpretation. Published in 1961 by Schocken Books, Parables and Paradoxes presented in a bilingual edition by Nahum N. Glatzer selected writings, drawn from notebooks, diaries, letters, short fictional works and the novel Der Process.

New translations were completed and published based on the recompiled German text of Pasley and Schillemeit‍—‌The Castle, Critical by Mark Harman (Schocken Books, 1998), The Trial, Critical by Breon Mitchell (Schocken Books, 1998), and The Man Who Disappeared (Amerika) by Michael Hofmann (Penguin Books, 1996) and Amerika: The Missing Person by Mark Harman (Schocken Books, 2008).

==== Translation problems to English ====
Kafka often made extensive use of a characteristic particular to German, which permits long sentences that sometimes can span an entire page. Kafka's sentences sometimes deliver an unexpected impact just before the full stop, finalizing the meaning and focus of the sentence. This is due to the construction of subordinate clauses in German, which requires that the verb be at the end of the sentence. Such constructions are difficult to duplicate in English, so it is up to the translator to provide the reader with the same (or an at least equivalent) effect as the original text. German's more flexible word order and syntactical differences provide for multiple ways in which the same German writing can be translated into English. An example is the first sentence of Kafka's The Metamorphosis, which is crucial to the setting and understanding of the entire story:

Als Gregor Samsa eines Morgens aus unruhigen Träumen erwachte, fand er sich in seinem Bett zu einem ungeheuren Ungeziefer verwandelt.

— original
Translation:

As Gregor Samsa one morning from restless dreams awoke, found he himself in his bed into a monstrous vermin transformed.

— literal word-for-word translation

The sentence above also exemplifies an instance of another difficult problem facing translators: dealing with the author's intentional use of ambiguous idioms and words that have several meanings, which results in phrasing that is difficult to translate precisely. English translators often render the word Ungeziefer as 'insect'; in Middle German, however, Ungeziefer literally means 'an animal unclean for sacrifice'; in today's German, it means 'vermin'. It is sometimes used colloquially to mean 'bug'—a very general term, unlike the scientific 'insect'. Kafka had no intention of labeling Gregor, the protagonist of the story, as any specific thing but instead wanted to convey Gregor's disgust at his transformation. Another example of this can be found in the final sentence of "Das Urteil" ("The Judgement"), with Kafka's use of the German noun Verkehr. Literally, Verkehr means 'intercourse' and, as in English, can have either a sexual or a non-sexual meaning. The word is additionally used to mean 'transport' or 'traffic'; therefore the sentence can also be translated as: "At that moment an unending stream of traffic crossed over the bridge." The double meaning of Verkehr is given added weight by Kafka's confession to Brod that when he wrote that final line he was thinking of "a violent ejaculation".

== Legacy ==
=== Literary and cultural influence ===
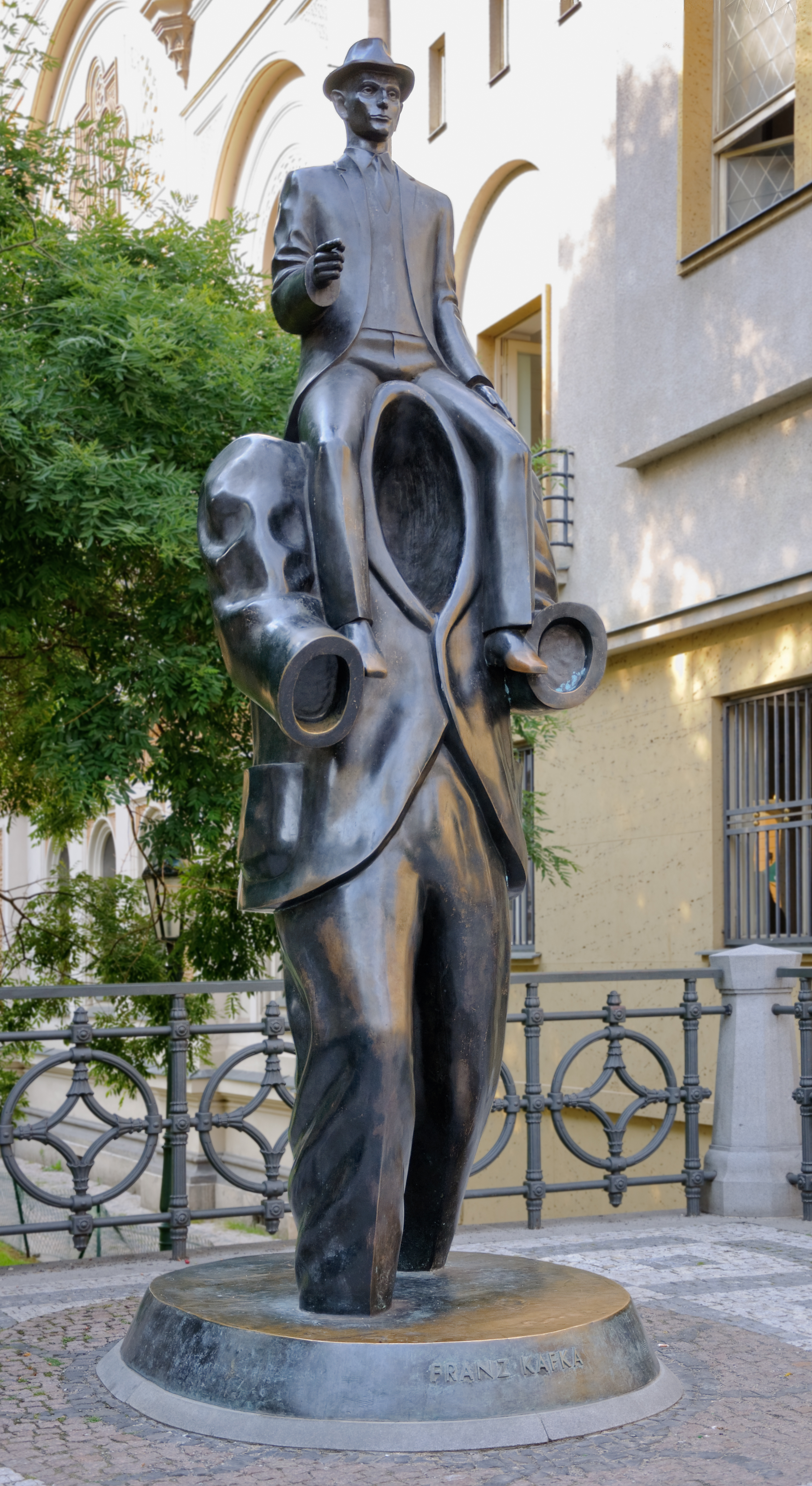
Jaroslav Róna's bronze Statue of Franz Kafka in Prague

Unlike many famous writers, Kafka is rarely quoted by others. Instead, he is noted more for his visions and perspective. Kafka had a strong influence on Gabriel García Márquez, Milan Kundera and the novel The Palace of Dreams by Ismail Kadare. Shimon Sandbank, a professor, literary critic, and writer, also identifies Kafka as having influenced Jorge Luis Borges, Albert Camus, Eugène Ionesco, J. M. Coetzee and Jean-Paul Sartre. A Financial Times literary critic credits Kafka with influencing José Saramago, and Al Silverman, a writer and editor, states that J. D. Salinger loved to read Kafka's works. The Romanian writer Mircea Cărtărescu said "Kafka is the author I love the most and who means, for me, the gate to literature"; he also described Kafka as "the saint of literature".

Kafka has been cited as an influence on the Swedish writer Stig Dagerman, and the Japanese writer Haruki Murakami, who paid homage to Kafka in his novel Kafka on the Shore with the namesake protagonist and in his short story, "Samsa in Love", with its opening sentence, "He woke to discover that he had undergone a metamorphosis and become Gregor Samsa".

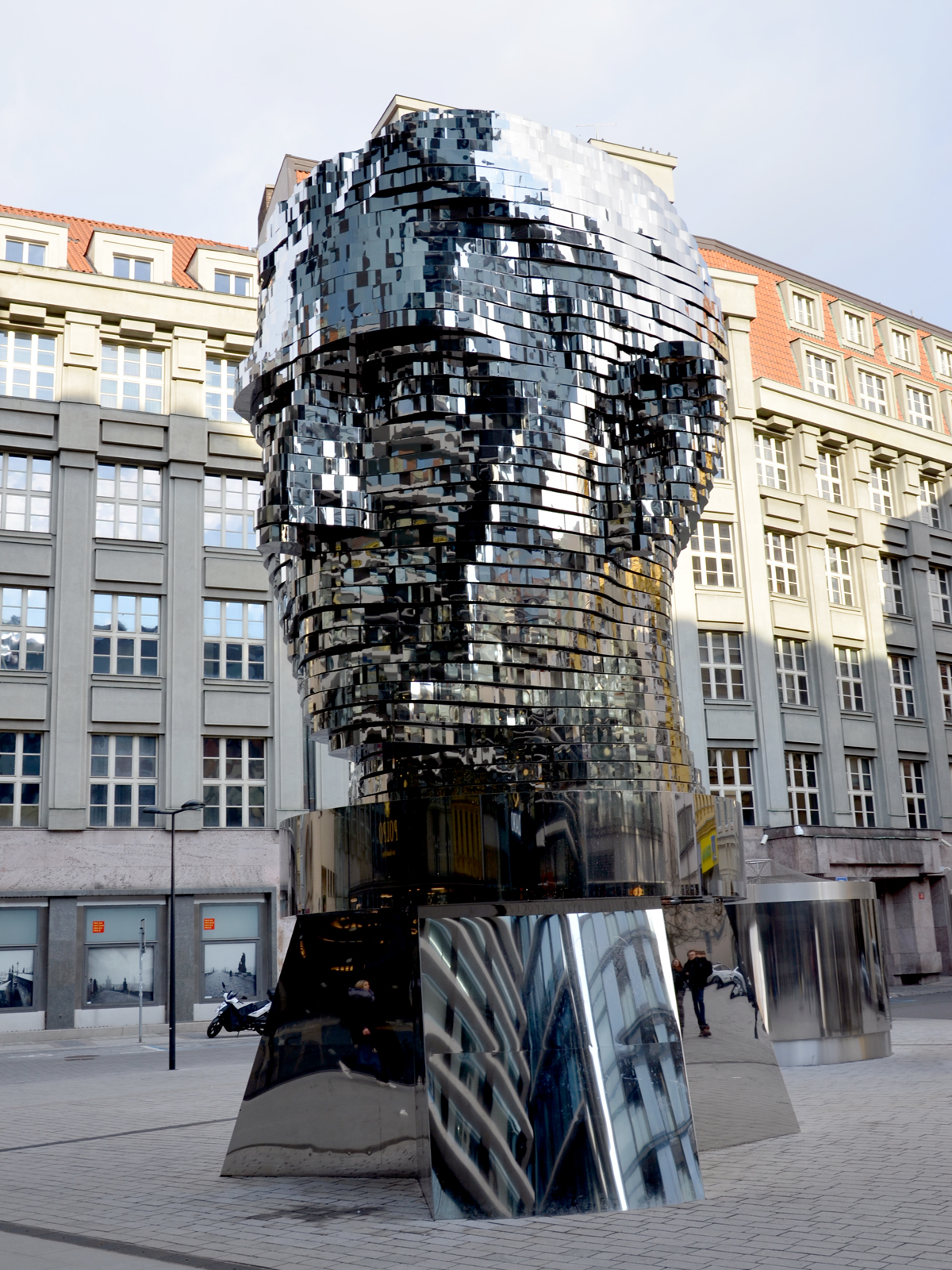
David Černý's Head of Franz Kafka sculpture in Prague

In 1999 a committee of 99 authors, scholars, and literary critics ranked Der Process and Das Schloss the second and ninth most significant German-language novels of the 20th century. Harold Bloom said "when he is most himself, Kafka gives us a continuous inventiveness and originality that rivals Dante and truly challenges Proust and Joyce as that of the dominant Western author of our century". Sandbank argues that despite Kafka's pervasiveness, his enigmatic style has yet to be emulated. Neil Christian Pages, a professor of German Studies and Comparative Literature at Binghamton University who specialises in Kafka's works, says Kafka's influence transcends literature and literary scholarship; it impacts visual arts, music, and popular culture. Harry Steinhauer, a professor of German and Jewish literature, says that Kafka "has made a more powerful impact on literate society than any other writer of the twentieth century". Brod said that the 20th century will one day be known as the "century of Kafka".

Michel-André Bossy writes that Kafka created a rigidly inflexible and sterile bureaucratic universe. Kafka wrote in an aloof manner full of legal and scientific terms. Yet his serious universe also had insightful humour, all highlighting the "irrationality at the roots of a supposedly rational world". His characters are trapped, confused, full of guilt, frustrated, and lacking understanding of their surreal world. Much post-Kafka fiction, especially science fiction, follows the themes and precepts of Kafka's universe. This can be seen in the works of authors such as George Orwell and Ray Bradbury.

Karolina Watroba discusses several Korean novels "that take their cue from Kafka".

The following are examples of works across a range of dramatic, literary, and musical genres that demonstrate the extent of Kafka's cultural influence:

Title	Year	Medium	Remarks	Ref
"La lotería en Babilonia", trans. "The Lottery in Babylon"	1941	short story	by Jorge Luis Borges, refers to "a sacred latrine called Qaphqa [Kafka]"	
Ein Landarzt	1951	opera	by Hans Werner Henze, based on Kafka's story, "A Country Doctor"	
"A Friend of Kafka"	1962	short story	by Nobel Prize winner Isaac Bashevis Singer, about a Yiddish actor called Jacques Kohn who said he knew Franz Kafka; in this story, according to Jacques Kohn, Kafka believed in the Golem, a legendary creature from Jewish folklore	
La metamorfosis	1962	film	the third fiction film directed by Venezuelan painter and filmmaker Ángel Hurtado; it was based on the Spanish translation of The Metamorphosis by Jorge Luis Borges.	
The Trial	1962	film	the film's director, Orson Welles, said, "Say what you like, but The Trial is my greatest work, even greater than Citizen Kane"	
Watermelon Man	1970	film	partly inspired by The Metamorphosis, where a white bigot wakes up as a black man	
Colony	1980	music	by English rock band Joy Division, inspired by the Kafka story In the Penal Colony	
Kafka	1983	play	by Jack Klaff	
Kafka-Fragmente, Op. 24	1985	music	by Hungarian composer György Kurtág for soprano and violin, using fragments of Kafka's diary and letters	
Kafka's Dick	1986	play	by Alan Bennett, in which the ghosts of Kafka, his father Hermann and Brod arrive at the home of an English insurance clerk (and Kafka aficionado) and his wife	
Better Morphosis	1991	short story	parodic short story by Brian W. Aldiss, where a cockroach wakes up one morning to find out that it has turned into Franz Kafka	
Kafka	1991	film	stars Jeremy Irons as the eponymous author; written by Lem Dobbs and directed by Steven Soderbergh, the movie mixes his life and fiction providing a semi-biographical presentation of Kafka's life and works; Kafka investigates the disappearance of one of his colleagues, taking Kafka through many of the writer's own works, most notably The Castle and The Trial	
A Letter to Elise	1992	music	by English rock band The Cure, was heavily influenced by Letters to Felice by Kafka	
Das Schloß	1992	opera	German-language opera by Aribert Reimann who wrote his own libretto based on Kafka's novel and its dramatization by Max Brod, premiered on 2 September 1992 at the Deutsche Oper Berlin, staged by Willy Decker and conducted by Michael Boder.	
Young Indiana Jones	1993	television	by George Lucas in which a fictional Kafka appears in the episode Espionage Escapades as a friend of Indiana Jones.	
Franz Kafka's It's a Wonderful Life	1993	film	short comedy film made for BBC Scotland, won an Oscar, was written and directed by Peter Capaldi, and starred Richard E. Grant as Kafka	
Bad Mojo	1996	computer game	loosely based on The Metamorphosis, with characters named Franz and Roger Samms, alluding to Gregor Samsa	
In the Penal Colony	2000	opera	by Philip Glass, to a libretto by Rudy Wurlitzer	
Home Movies	2001	television	animated sitcom by Brendon Small and Loren Bouchard, Season 1 episode Director's Cut depicts the child film crew attempting to shoot guitarist Dwayne's script for a rock opera version of The Metamorphosis	
Kafka on the Shore	2002	novel	by Japanese writer Haruki Murakami, on The New York Times 10 Best Books of 2005 list, World Fantasy Award recipient	
Statue of Franz Kafka	2003	sculpture	an outdoor sculpture on Vězeňská street in the Jewish Quarter of Prague, by artist Jaroslav Róna	
Kafka's Trial	2005	opera	by Danish composer Poul Ruders, based on the novel and parts of Kafka's life; first performed in 2005, released on CD	
Kafka's Soup	2005	book	by Mark Crick, is a literary pastiche in the form of a cookbook, with recipes written in the style of a famous author	
Kafka the Musical	2011	radio play	by BBC Radio 3 produced as part of their Play of the Week programme. Franz Kafka was played by David Tennant	
Sound Interpretations – Dedication To Franz Kafka	2012	music	HAZE Netlabel released musical compilation Sound Interpretations – Dedication To Franz Kafka. In this release musicians rethink the literary heritage of Kafka	
Google Doodle	2013	internet culture	Google had a sepia-toned doodle of a roach in a hat opening a door, honoring Kafka's 130th birthday	
The Metamorphosis	2013	dance	Royal Ballet production of The Metamorphosis with Edward Watson	
Café Kafka	2014	opera	by Spanish composer Francisco Coll on a text by Meredith Oakes, built from texts and fragments by Franz Kafka; Commissioned by Aldeburgh Music, Opera North and Royal Opera Covent Garden	
Head of Franz Kafka	2014	sculpture	an outdoor sculpture in Prague by David Černý	
Mr. Kafka: And Other Tales from the Time of the Cult	2015	short stories	Published in 1965 in Czech by Bohumil Hrabal, with its title meaning, according to Karolina Watroba, "An Ad for a House Where I No Longer Want to Live"; its 2015 translation is by Paul Wilson. The first story is titled "Mr. Kafka".	
Memoirs of a Polar Bear	2016	novel	Published in 2011 in German by Yoko Tawada, English translation by Susan Bernofsky published in 2016. An anthropomorphic polar bear reads Kafka.	
Forest Dark	2017	novel	by Nicole Krauss; partly based on the conceit that Kafka staged his death and funeral in Austria; he moved to Palestine (later Israel), where he lived out his life under an assumed name, working as a gardener, dying in 1958	
VRwandlung	2018	virtual reality	a virtual reality experience of the first part of The Metamorphosis, directed by Mika Johnson	
Milena, Milena, Ecstatic	2019	novella	by Bae Suah, translated by Deborah Smith, a Korean story "about a man who cannot stop reading Kafka's letters to his lover and translator Milena Jesenská".	
Die Herrlichkeit des Lebens (The Glory of Life)	2024	film	biographical film directed by Judith Kaufmann and Georg Maas	
Lovers of Franz K.	2025	novella	by Burhan Sönmez, translated from Kurdish by Sami Hêzil. About an attempt to murder Max Brod for his "betrayal" of Kafka by not destroying his manuscripts.	
Letters to Kafka	2025	novel	novel by Christine Estima, published by House of Anansi Press, that recounts the love story between Kafka and Milena Jesenská	
Franz	2025	film	biographical film directed by Agnieszka Holland	
Kafka's Last Trial	2025	film	documentary film directed by Eliran Peled about the legal and philosophical battle over Kafka's unpublished manuscripts	

=== "Kafkaesque" ===
The term "Kafkaesque" is used to describe concepts and situations reminiscent of Kafka's work, particularly Der Process (The Trial) and Die Verwandlung (The Metamorphosis). Examples include instances in which bureaucracies overpower people, often in a surreal, nightmarish milieu that evokes feelings of senselessness, disorientation, and helplessness. Characters in a Kafkaesque setting often lack a clear course of action to escape a labyrinthine situation. Kafkaesque elements often appear in existential works, but the term has transcended the literary realm to apply to real-life occurrences and situations that are incomprehensibly complex, bizarre, or illogical.

Numerous films and television works have been described as Kafkaesque, and the style is particularly prominent in dystopian science fiction. Works in this genre that have been so described include Patrick Bokanowski's film The Angel (1982), Terry Gilliam's film Brazil (1985), and Alex Proyas's science fiction film noir, Dark City (1998). Films from other genres that have been similarly described include Roman Polanski's The Tenant (1976), Joseph Losey's Monsieur Klein (1976) and the Coen brothers' Barton Fink (1991). The television series The Prisoner and The Twilight Zone are also frequently described as Kafkaesque. According to Kafka scholars, the term has become so ubiquitous that it is often misused. Ben Marcus, as paraphrased in "What It Really Means to be 'Kafkaesque'" by Joe Fassler in The Atlantic, wrote, "Kafka's quintessential qualities are affecting use of language, a setting that straddles fantasy and reality, and a sense of striving even in the face of bleakness—hopelessly and full of hope."

=== Commemorations ===
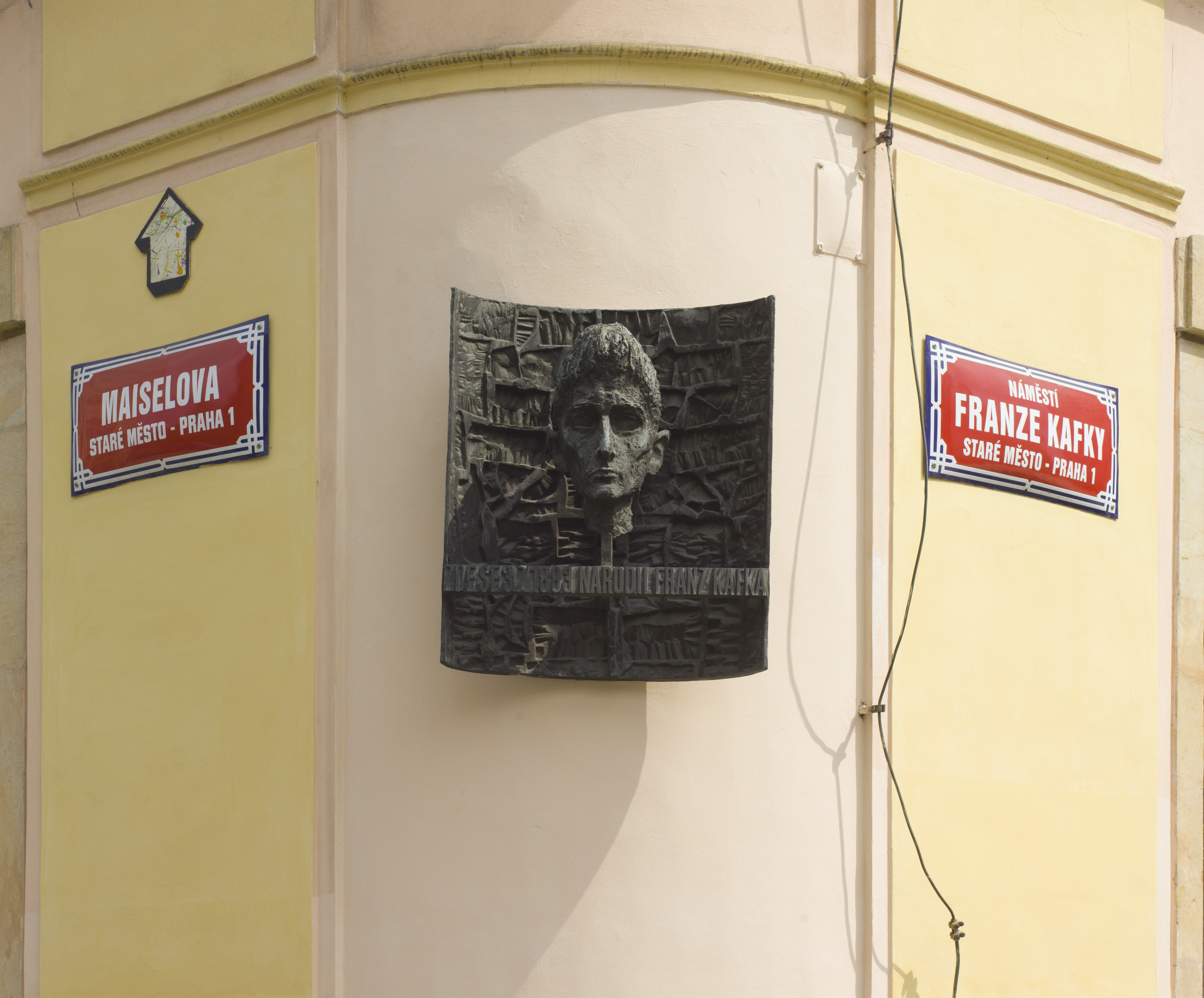
Plaque marking the birthplace of Franz Kafka in Prague, designed by Karel Hladík and Jan Kaplický, 1966

3412 Kafka is an asteroid from the inner regions of the asteroid belt, approximately 6 kilometers in diameter. It was discovered on 10 January 1983 by American astronomers Randolph Kirk and Donald Rudy at Palomar Observatory in California, United States, and named after Kafka by them.

The Franz Kafka Museum in Prague is dedicated to Kafka and his work. A major component of the museum is an exhibit, The City of K. Franz Kafka and Prague, which was first shown in Barcelona in 1999, moved to the Jewish Museum in New York City, and finally established in Prague in Malá Strana (Lesser Town), along the Moldau, in 2005. The museum aims with this exhibit to immerse the visitor into the world in which Kafka lived and about which he wrote.

The Franz Kafka Prize, established in 2001, is an annual literary award of the Franz Kafka Society and the City of Prague. It recognizes the merits of literature as "humanistic character and contribution to cultural, national, language and religious tolerance, its existential, timeless character, its generally human validity, and its ability to hand over a testimony about our times". The selection committee and recipients come from all over the world, but are limited to living authors who have had at least one work published in Czech. The recipient receives $10,000, a diploma, and a bronze statuette at a presentation in Prague's Old Town Hall, on the Czech State Holiday in late October.

San Diego State University operates the Kafka Project, which began in 1998 as the official international search for Kafka's last writings.
