= Valli Kafka =

Sister of Franz Kafka (1890–1942)

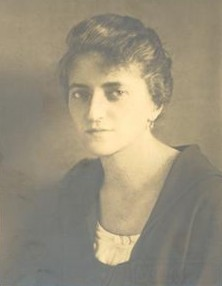
Valerie "Valli" Pollaková, 1922

Valerie "Valli" Kafka Pollak (25 September 1890 in Prague – Fall of 1942 at Chełmno extermination camp) was the second youngest sister of Franz Kafka.

== Life ==
Valli Kafka attended the German Girls' School in Prague and later a private further educational institution for girls. Little is known about Franz Kafka's relationship with his sister. Of all the siblings, she was supposedly the one who had the least trouble with her father, Hermann Kafka. Outwardly, she seemed discreet and adjusted, however she was well-read and inclined to language.

She married commercial employee Josef Pollak with whom she had two daughters, Marianne (1913–2000) and Lotte (1914–1931). She became one of the first woman teachers in the Prague Jewish School founded in 1920.

In late October 1941 Valli and her husband were deported to the Łódź Ghetto where they lived together temporarily with Valli's sister Elli and her daughter Hanna in the spring of 1942. Valerie Pollak was probably murdered in the fall of 1942 in the Chełmno extermination camp. Elli and the third sister Ottla as well as other relatives also became victims of the Holocaust. At the family grave in the New Jewish Cemetery in Prague, a plaque commemorates the three sisters.

Her first daughter Marianne emigrated to England along with her husband Georg Steiner in 1939. She looked after the inheritance of her uncle Franz Kafka lodged in the Bodleian Library in the University of Oxford.

== Bibliography ==
- Wagnerová, Alena (2001). Die Familie Kafka aus Prag [The Kafka Family from Prague]. Frankfurt am Main: Fischer. ISBN 3-596-14355-1.
