= 3412 Kafka =

Asteroid

Discovery
- Discovered by: R. Kirk; D. Rudy
- Discovery site: Palomar Obs.
- Discovery date: 10 January 1983

Designations
- Named after: Franz Kafka (Austrian–Czech writer)
- Alternative designations: 1983 AU_{2} · 1942 YB; 1977 FF_{3} · 1978 PA_{2} 1978 QE_{1}
- Minor planet category: main-belt

Orbital characteristics
- Epoch 4 September 2017 (JD 2458000.5)
- Uncertainty parameter 0
- Observation arc: 74.42 yr (27,182 days)
- Aphelion: 2.4565 AU
- Perihelion: 1.9925 AU
- Semi-major axis: 2.2245 AU
- Eccentricity: 0.1043
- Orbital period (sidereal): 3.32 yr (1,212 days)
- Mean anomaly: 194.88°
- Inclination: 2.9731°
- Longitude of ascending node: 307.60°
- Argument of perihelion: 117.70°

Physical characteristics
- Dimensions: 6.084±0.080 km
- Synodic rotation period: 2766±40 h
- Geometric albedo: 0.231±0.076
- Absolute magnitude (H): 13.4

3412 Kafka, provisional designation 1983 AU_{2}, is an asteroid from the inner regions of the asteroid belt, approximately 6 kilometers in diameter. It was discovered on 10 January 1983, by American astronomers Randolph Kirk and Donald Rudy at Palomar Observatory in California, United States. The asteroid was named after writer Franz Kafka.

== Orbit and classification ==
Kafka orbits the Sun in the inner main-belt at a distance of 2.0–2.5 AU once every 3 years and 4 months (1,212 days). Its orbit has an eccentricity of 0.10 and an inclination of 3° with respect to the ecliptic. It was first identified as 1942 YB at the Finnish Turku Observatory in 1942, extending the body's observation arc by 41 years prior to its official discovery observation at Palomar.

== Physical characteristics ==
According to the survey carried out by NASA's Wide-field Infrared Survey Explorer with its subsequent NEOWISE mission, Kafka measures 6.1 kilometers in diameter and its surface has an albedo of 0.231. Kafka is a superslow rotator. Its rotation period of 2,766 hours (about 115 days) is among the longest of any known asteroid.

== Naming ==
This minor planet was named after Franz Kafka (1883–1924), Austrian–Czech writer of novels and short stories, in which protagonists are faced with bizarre or surrealistic situations. The approved naming citation was published by the Minor Planet Center on 13 February 1987 (M.P.C. 11641).
