= German sentence structure =

Structure of sentences in the German language

German sentence structure is the syntactical structure to which the German language adheres.

The basic sentence in German can be seen following the (Standard Average European) subject–verb–object word order (SVO). Additionally, German, like all living Germanic standard languages except English, (Note: Although English uses V2 word order in certain circumstances, such as questions.) uses V2 word order (verb second), though generally in independent clauses. (Note: Icelandic and Yiddish do not apply this restriction.) In normal dependent clauses, the finite verb is placed last, followed by the infinite verb if existing, whereas main clauses including an auxiliary verb reserve the default final position for the infinite verb, keeping the finite verb second. Hence, both of these sentence types apply subject–object–verb word order (SOV), the first one quite purely, the latter in a mix. It is not uncommon to consider the original SOV the basic type.

== Independent clauses ==
=== Declarative sentences ===
Declarative sentences use V2 (verb in the second position) word order: the finite verb is preceded by one and only one constituent (unlike in English, this does not need to be the subject); in Germanic tradition, the position occupied by this constituent is referred to as the prefield (Vorfeld). Coordinating conjunctions like und ('and') or aber ('but') precede both the prefield and the finite verb, and so do topicalised elements (similarly to "that" in English phrases such as "that I don't know"). The prefield is often used to convey emphasis.

ich seh-e den Baum
I.NOM see.PRS-1SG the.ACC.SG.M tree.ACC.SG
'I see the tree.'

den Baum seh-e ich
the.ACC.SG.M tree.ACC.SG see.PRS-1SG I.NOM
'I see the tree.'

du siehst den Fluss und ich seh-e den Baum
you.SG see.PRS.2SG the.ACC.SG.M river.ACC.SG and I.NOM see.PRS.1SG the.ACC.SG.M tree.ACC.SG
'You see the river, and I see the tree.'

Non-finite verbs as well as separable particles are placed at the end of the sentence:

der König ist an der Burg an=ge-komm-en
the.NOM.SG.M king.NOM.SG be.PRS.3SG at the.DAT.SG.F castle.DAT.SG on=PST.PTCP_{1‍}-come-PST.PTCP_{1‍}
'The King has arrived (lit. "is on-come") at the castle.'

der König kam an der Burg an
the.NOM.SG.M king.NOM.SG come.PST.3SG at the.DAT.SG.F castle.DAT.SG on
'The King arrived (lit. "on-came") at the castle.'

der König wird an der Burg an=komm-en
the.NOM.SG.M king.NOM.SG will.PRS.3SG at the.DAT.SG.F castle.DAT.SG on=come-INF
'The King will arrive (lit. "will on-come") at the castle.'

In the midfield (the part of the clause between the position of the finite verb and that of the clause-final verb cluster), German word order is highly variable.

Conventional German syntax presents information within a declarative sentence in the following order:

- Wichtigstes (what is the most important thing within all the elements following the finite verb?)
  - The word da when taking the meaning of "then suddenly" must take the first place. Dann ('then') does so often, but not necessarily; otherwise, the subject of the sentence may take first place.
  - If the verb is the most important, the unconjugated (normally second) part of the separable verb is placed here, but still separated from the conjugated (normally first) part. If the verb is not separable or periphrastical, the infinitive is used.
- Was ('what?' - the conjugated verb)
  - In this case, a form of tun is inserted for the conjugated verb, as in "Arbeiten tun wir" ("Working, that's what we do").
- Wer ('who?' - the subject)
- Wem ('to/for whom' – dative object)
- Wann ('when' – time)
- Warum ('why' – reason)
- Wie ('how' – manner)
- Wo ('where' – place)
- Wen ('whom' – accusative object)
- Wohin/Woher ('to/from where')
- Verb, nochmal (first part of the separable verb)

Wir gehen am Freitag miteinander ins Kino. Literally, 'We go on Friday together to the movies.'

Wegen ihres Jahrestages bereiten wir unseren Eltern einen Ausflug nach München vor. Literally, 'Because of their anniversary plan we our parents a trip to Munich.'

In conversational past tense, comparisons can be put after both parts of the verb. So:

Mein Bernhardiner ist/war größer gewesen als ich. / Mein Bernhardiner war größer als ich.

OR

Mein Bernhardiner ist/war größer als ich gewesen.

'My St. Bernard (dog) has/had been bigger than I. / My St. Bernard was bigger than I.'

German often structures a sentence according to increasing importance of the phrase towards the conversation. So:

Wir gehen am Donnerstag ins Kino. 'We're going to the movies on Thursday.'

BUT

An welchem Tag gehen wir ins Kino? '(On) What day are we going to the movies?'

Am Donnerstag gehen wir ins Kino. 'On Thursday we're going to the movies.'

OR

Wir gehen am Donnerstag ins Kino. 'We're going on Thursday to the movies.'

In ditransitive sentences, pronouns usually go between the verb and all other elements of the sentence:

Maria gibt mir morgen das Hemd. 'Maria is giving me tomorrow the shirt.'

BUT

Maria gibt es mir morgen. 'Maria is giving it to me tomorrow.'

==== Inversion ====
An inversion is used to emphasize an adverbial phrase, a predicative, an object, or an inner verbal phrase in a sentence. The subject phrase, at the beginning of an indicative unstressed sentence, is moved directly behind the conjugated verb, and the component to be emphasized is moved to the beginning of the sentence as the conjugated verb is always the second sentence element in such indicative statements.

Example 1:

"Ich fliege schnell." 'I fly fast.' – unstressed
"Schnell fliege ich." 'I fly fast.' – stressed "schnell"/'fast' (i.e., "Fast is how I fly.")

Example 2:

"Du bist wunderschön." 'You are lovely." – unstressed
"Wunderschön bist du." 'You are lovely.' – stressed "wunderschön"/'beautiful' (i.e., "Lovely is what you are.")

Example 3:

"Ich bin gelaufen." 'I ran.' – unstressed
"Gelaufen bin ich!" 'I ran!' – stressed "gelaufen"/'ran' (i.e., "Run is what I did!")

==== Equal main clauses ====
Verb-second is retained also in the subsequent elements of equal main clauses which are recognizable by their conjunctions, especially: und ('and'), oder ('or'), aber ('but'), sondern ('but rather'), doch ('though'), jedoch ('however'), denn ('because').

Auguste Viktoria verlässt uns, denn Wilhelm dankt ab
Auguste Viktoria.NOM leaves.PRS-3SG us.1PL.ACC because Wilhelm.NOM thanks.PRS.3SG off
'Auguste Viktoria leaves us because Wilhelm abdicates (lit. "thanks off").'

Unlike the synonymous but (in standard German) subordinating weil/da, denn cannot introduce the entire sentence.

=== Interrogative sentences ===
Questions are generally divided into yes–no questions and wh-questions.

Specific questions are similar to inverted statements. They begin with a question word, which is followed by the conjugated verb, followed by the subject (if there is one), and then the rest of the sentence.

Was machst du jetzt? ("What are you doing now?")
Wer geht ins Kino? ("Who is going to the cinema?" – In this sentence, the interrogative pronoun wer serves as the subject)

==== Yes–no questions ====
In yes–no questions, the verb-initial word order (V1) is used: the finite verb occupies the first position in the sentence; here, there is no prefield.

siehst du den Baum
see.PRS.2SG you.SG the.ACC.SG.M tree.ACC.SG
'Do you see the tree?'

However, conjunctions and topicalised elements still precede the finite verb:

aber hast du den Baum ge-seh-en
but have.PRS.2SG you.SG the.ACC.SG.M tree.ACC.SG PST.PTCP_{1‍}-see-PST.PTCP_{1‍}
'But have you seen the tree?'

den Baum hast du den ge-seh-en
the.ACC.SG.M tree.ACC.SG have.PRS.2SG you.SG DEM.ACC.SG.M PST.PTCP_{1‍}-see-PST.PTCP_{1‍}
'The tree, have you seen it?'

==== Wh questions ====
Wh questions work in much the same way as they do in English. Like English, German also has Wh-movement:

welchen Baum hast du ge-seh-en
INTERR.DET.ACC.SG.M tree.ACC.SG have.PRS.2SG you.SG PST.PTCP_{1‍}-see-PST.PTCP_{1‍}
'What tree have you seen?'

wohin geh-en wir
whither go.PRS-1PL we.NOM
'Where are we going?'

=== Commands ===
For commands, the imperative mood is used. Like questions, commands use V1 word order:

reich-(e) mir das Salz
pass-IMP.SG I.DAT the.ACC.SG.N salt.ACC.SG
'Pass me the salt!'

In contemporary German, the imperative singular ending -e is usually omitted. The second-person-singular pronouns du 'you (sg)' and ihr 'you (pl)' are redundant but sometimes used for emphasis:

bring(e) [du] mir das Buch
fetch-IMP.SG [you] I.DAT the.ACC.SG.N book.ACC.SG
'Fetch me the book!'

Like in English, nouns or non-finite verb forms can sometimes be used to give commands:

Achtung Stufe
attention.NOM.SG step.NOM.SG
'Mind the step!'

warm an=zieh-en nicht vergess-en
warm.ADJ on=pull-INF not forget-INF
'Don't forget to dress warmly!'

== Dependent clauses ==
Dependent clauses follow the Vfinal scheme (if applicable, in subject-object-verb word order):

=== 'That' clauses ===
Using the conjunction dass 'that':

Ich weiß dass Erna hier ist
I.NOM know.PRS.1SG that Erna.NOM here be.PRS.3SG
'I know that Erna is here.'

wer hat dir erzähl-t dass ich bald nach England zieh-e(n werd-e)
who.NOM have.PRS.3SG you.DAT.SG tell.PST.PTCP that I.NOM soon to England.NOM move (will.PRS.1SG)
'Who told you that I'm about to move to England?'

dass zwei größer als eins ist, ist selbstverständlich
that two greater than one be.PRS.3SG be.PRS.3SG obvious
'That two is greater than one is obvious.'

However, root clause V2 order occurs when omitting dass after a bridge verb:

Wir glauben Kaffeehäuser bilden noch
We.NOM believe.PRS.1PL coffeehouses.NOM educate.PRS.3PL still
'We believe coffeehouses are still educational.'

=== Clauses headed by a subordinator ===
sie schrieb es nieder sodass sie es nicht vergess-en würd-e
she.NOM write.PRET.3SG it.ACC down so.that she.NOM it.ACC not forget.INF would.SUBJII-3SG
'She wrote it down so that she would not forget it.'

wir soll-t-en uns beeil-en damit wir rechtzeitig an=komm-en
we.NOM shall-PRET-1PL we.REFL hurry-INF in.order.that we.NOM in.time on=.come-INF
'We should hurry so that we arrive in time.'

ich helf-e dir weil ich dich mag
I.NOM help.PRS-1SG you.3SG.DAT because I.NOM you.ACC like.PRS.1SG
'I help you because I like you.'

=== Relative clauses ===
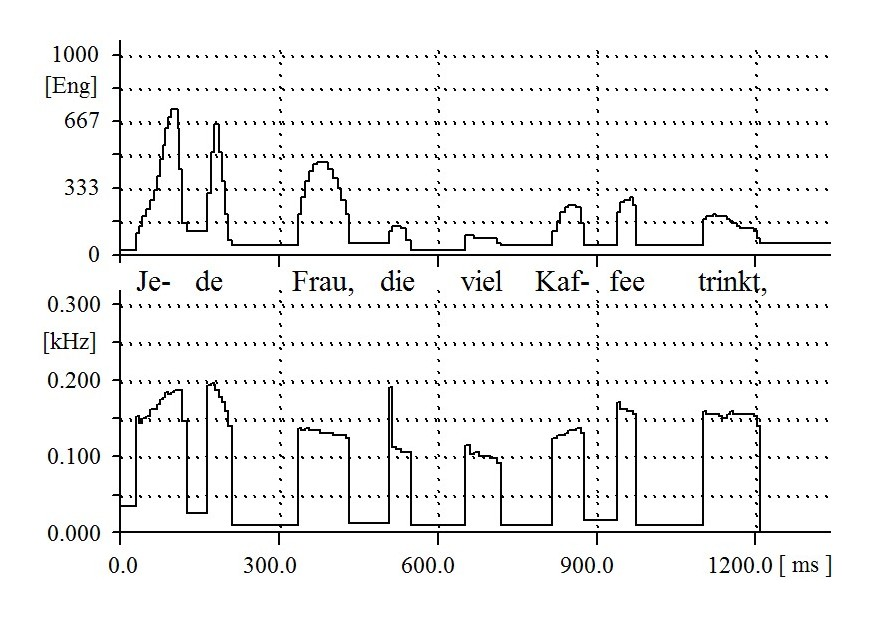
Intonation of German restrictive relative clauses

There are two varieties of relative clauses. The more common one is based on the definite article der, die, das, but with distinctive forms in the genitive (dessen, deren) and in the dative plural (denen). Historically, this is related to the English that. The second, which is typically used in more literary contexts and used for emphasis, is the relative use of welcher, welche, welches, comparable with English which. As in most Germanic languages, including Old English, both of these varieties inflect according to gender, case and number. They take their gender and number from the noun which they modify, but the case from their function in their own clause.

der Kaiser der ab=dank-te
the.NOM.SG.M emperor.NOM.SG REL.NOM.SG.M off-thankedPST.3SG
'The emperor who abdicated (lit. "thanked off")!'

das Landhaus in dem ich auf der Alm wohne ist alt
the.NOM.SG.N chalet.NOM.SG in REL.DAT.SG.N I.NOM on the.DAT.SG.F. alp.NOM.SG live.PRS.1SG be.PRS.3SG old
'The chalet (lit. country house) in which I live on the alp is old.'

The relative pronoun dem is neuter (otherwise masculine) singular to agree with Landhaus, but dative because it follows a preposition in its own clause. On the same basis, it would be possible to substitute the given neuter noun with the pronoun welchem ('which'; also dative/masculine).

However, German uses the uninflecting was ('what') as a relative pronoun when the antecedent is alles, etwas or nichts ('everything', 'something', 'nothing').

alles was Jakob macht gelingt ihm
everything.NOM.SG.N what.ACC.SG Jakob.NOM make.PRS.3SG {turn out well.PRS.3SG} 3SG.DAT
'Everything Jakob does (lit. "makes") is a success (lit. "turns out well to him").'

In German, all relative clauses are marked with commas, so they follow the general standard for dependent clauses.

Alternatively, particularly in formal registers, participles (both active and passive) can be used to embed relative clauses in adjectival phrases:

Die von ihr in jenem romantischen Stil gemalten Bilder sind sehr begehrt.
'The pictures painted by her in that Romantic style are highly sought after.'

Die Bundesregierung erwartet[,] diese im laufenden Jahr eher langsam wachsende Industrie weiter subventionieren zu können.
'The Federal Government expects to be able to further subsidize this industry, which is growing rather slowly over the current year.'

Unlike English, which only permits relatively small participle phrases in adjectival positions (typically just the participle and adverbs), and disallows the use of direct objects for active participles, German sentences of this sort can embed clauses of arbitrary complexity.

=== Adverbial clauses ===
An adverbial clause begins with a conjunction, defining its relation to the verb or nominal phrase described.

Als ich zum Spaß über das Wattenmeer gesegelt bin, setzte der Regen wieder ein. ('When/As I was sailing across the Wadden Sea for fun, the rain set in again.')

Some other examples of such conjunctions: während ('while'), bevor ('before'), nachdem ('after'), obwohl ('although'), wenn/falls ('if'). Dropping the latter, conditional conjunction makes the clause appear like a yes–no question:

Ist alles klar, [dann] kannst du froh sein. = Wenn/Falls alles klar ist, [dann] kannst du froh sein. ('If everything is clear, [then] you can be happy.')
