= Deaths in November 1984 =

The following is a list of notable deaths in November 1984.

Entries for each day are listed alphabetically by surname. A typical entry lists information in the following sequence:

- Name, age, country of citizenship at birth, subsequent country of citizenship (if applicable), reason for notability, cause of death (if known), and reference.

== November 1984 ==
=== 1 ===
- Paul Baldacci, 77, American football player and coach.
- Ramón Castro Jijón, 68, Ecuadorian politician, acting president (1963–1966).
- Ian Fleming, 74, Australian footballer.
- Norman Krasna, 74, American filmmaker (Princess O'Rourke) and playwright, heart attack.
- Marcel Moyse, 95, French flautist.
- Boris Souvarine, 89, French writer and communist activist.
- Anton Toscani, 83, Dutch Olympic racewalker (1936).

=== 2 ===
- Soli Adashev, 61, Uzbek squad commander and World War II veteran who was awarded the Hero of the Soviet Union
- Velma Barfield, 52, American convicted serial killer, execution by lethal injection.
- Julius Battista, 68, American football player.
- Eugene N. Costales, 90, American philatelist.
- István Fáry, 62, Hungarian-American mathematician.
- Ernst Føyn, 80, Norwegian oceanographer and chemist.
- Bert Lacey, 84, Australian politician.
- Max Leon, 80, American impresario.
- Louis Sherman, 77, American politician, member of the Pennsylvania House of Representatives (1955–1972).
- Jerzy Siankiewicz, 54, Polish Olympic field hockey player (1952).
- I. S. K. Soboleff, 91, Russian-British travel writer.

=== 3 ===
- Claude Aubry, 70, Canadian librarian and author.
- David Chávez, 86, American politician and judge.
- Aldo Donati, 74, Italian footballer.
- George Forbes, 77, Scottish cricketer.
- Leonard La Cour, 77, British cytologist.
- Clayton W. Mapoles, 70, American politician, member of the Florida Senate (1961–1965).
- Harry McEvoy, 82, British industrialist and food manufacturer.
- Stan Obodiac, 62, Canadian ice hockey player.
- Jack Price, 84, English footballer.
- Bhagwat Singh of Mewar, 63, Indian titular royal and cricketer.

=== 4 ===
- Lars Amandus Aasgard, 77, Norwegian politician for the Christian Democratic Party
- Merie Earle, 95, American actress, uremia poisoning

=== 5 ===
- Thelma Gutsche, 69, South African filmmaker, film historian, writer, and arts patron
- Gerhard Hönicke, 54, German long-distance runner and Olympian
- Ivor Montagu, 80, English filmmaker, screenwriter, producer, film critic, writer, table tennis player, and Communist activist and spy
- Rehman, 63, Indian actor

=== 6 ===
- Domenico Purificato, 69, Italian painter
- Gastón Suárez, 55, Bolivian novelist and dramatist

=== 7 ===
- Howard C. Davidson, 94, American major general in the United States Army Air Forces
- Ghulam Mohammad Farhad, 82 or 83, Afghan engineer
- Anita Gregory, 59, German-born British psychologist and parapsychologist
- George Mathews, 73, American actor, heart disease
- Friedrich Maurer, 86, German philologist who specialized in Germanic studies
- Ron Norris, 52, Indian boxer

=== 8 ===
- Torsten Jöhncke, 72, Swedish ice hockey player

=== 9 ===
- Umar Seno Aji, 68, fifth Chief Justice of the Supreme Court of Indonesia
- Helen Clay Frick, 96, American philanthropist and art collector.

=== 10 ===
- Sudie Bond, 61, American actress, respiratory disease

=== 11 ===
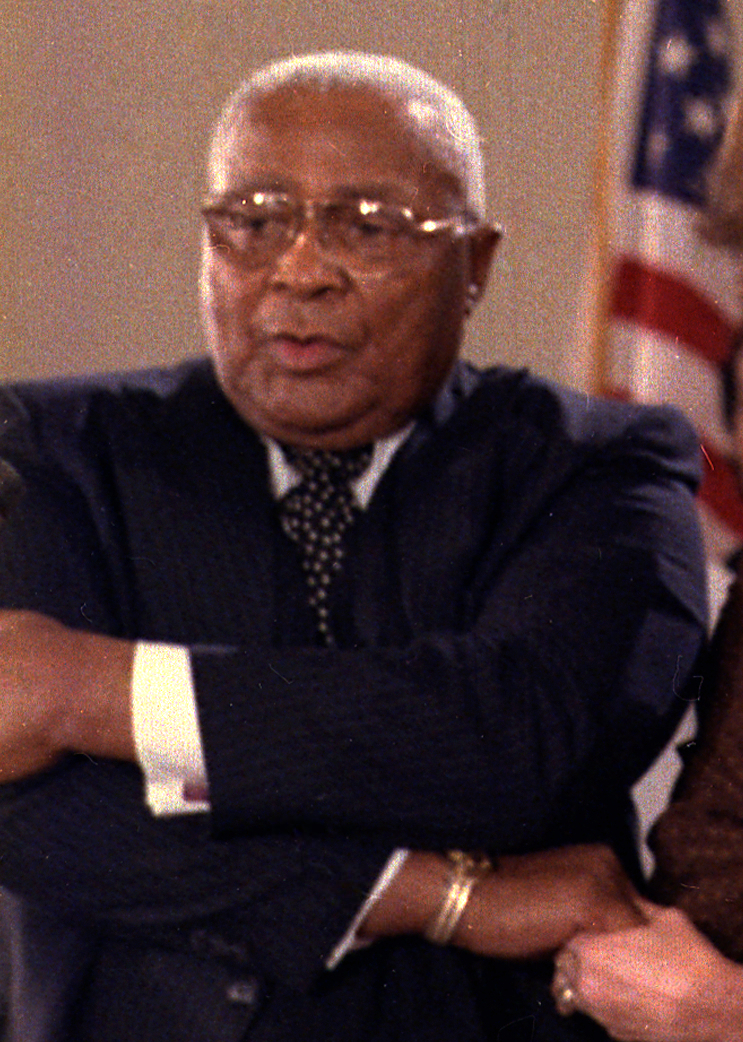
Martin Luther King Sr.

- Dorothy M. Johnson, 78, American Western fiction writer
- Martin Luther King Sr., 84, American Baptist pastor and missionary, activist for the civil rights movement, heart attack

=== 12 ===
- Jack Wrather, 66, American petroleum businessman and television producer, cancer

=== 13 ===
- Dorothy Arnold, 66, American actress, pancreatic cancer

=== 14 ===
- Wilhelm Antrup, 74, German air general
- Cesar Climaco, 68, Filipino politician, Mayor of Zamboanga
- János Faragó, 38, Hungarian Olympic athlete
- Iqbal Hassan, 41 or 42, Pakistani actor
- Alexander Hegarth, 61, German actor
- Keith Hudson, 37 or 38, Jamaican reggae artist and record producer

=== 15 ===
- Percy Seymour, 18th Duke of Somerset, 74, British peer
- Stephanie Fae Beauclair, 1 Month, American infant who was given a heart transplant from a baboon.

=== 16 ===
- Murray Alper, 80, American actor
- Vic Dickenson, 78, American jazz trombonist, cancer
- Leonard Rose, American cellist, leukaemia (b. 1918)

=== 17 ===
- James Baiss, 75, English cricketer
- Otto Küsel, 75, concentration camp survivor and escapee from Auschwitz
- Gerry McNamee, 50, Canadian swimmer
- Werner Milch, 81, German lawyer
- Harold Newgass, 85, British recipient of the George Cross and Royal Naval Volunteer Reserve officer
- Don Olive, 53, New Zealand racing cyclist
- Arthur Mackenzie Power, 63, British Royal Navy officer

=== 18 ===
- Mary Hamman, 77, American writer and editor
- Boutros el-Khoury, 76 or 77, Lebanese businessman, banker and industrialist
- Karel Klapálek, 91, Czech military leader
- Whiz Morris, 86, English cricketer
- Margaret Shelton, 69, Canadian artist
- Mehdi Zeinoddin, 25, Iranian major general in the IRGC during the Iran–Iraq War

=== 19 ===
- George Aiken, 92, American politician and horticulturist
- Ariyasinghe Ariyapperuma, 50, Sri Lankan Army officer
- Kerstin Isberg, 71, Swedish swimmer
- Martín Marculeta, 77, Spanish association footballer
- John McQuade, 73, Northern Irish unionist politician
- Graham Russell Mitchell, British MI5 officer
- Arthur Toby, 81, Australian rugby player

=== 20 ===
- Trygve Bratteli, Norwegian politician, 19th Prime Minister of Norway (b. 1910)
- Carlo Campanini, Italian actor (b. 1906)

=== 21 ===
- John Clark, 77, Australian politician
- Peter de Polnay, 78, Hungarian-born English novelist
- Magogo kaDinuzulu, 83 or 84, Zulu princess and musical artist
- Raymond Lebègue, 89, French literary historian
- Vincenzo Lucchini, 59, Swiss sports shooter
- Aslam Pervaiz, 52, Pakistani film actor, fatally injured in a car accident

=== 22 ===
- Olof Bergström, 65, Swedish actor
- John Gilling, 72, English film director and screenwriter
- Mohamed Salah Mzali, 88, Tunisian educator, historian and politician
- Gerd Nyquist, 71, Norwegian novelist and children's writer
- Denis Rose, 62, English jazz pianist and trumpeter
- Nikolai Tomsky, 83, Soviet sculptor
- Oleksiy Vatchenko, 70, Ukrainian and Soviet politician
- Robert Wordsworth, 90, Australian military officer and politician

=== 23 ===
- Tadashi Abe, 57 or 58, Japanese aikido teacher
- J. Waldo Ackerman, 58, American lawyer and judge
- Jean-Raymond Tournoux, 70, French journalist

=== 24 ===
- Paul Landa, 43, Australian politician
- Eira Lehtonen, 45, Finnish gymnast

=== 25 ===
- Minnie Abercrombie, 75, British zoologist, educationalist and psychologist.
- Jean Aubert, 90, German engineer
- Percy Chatterton, 86, English-born Papua New Guinean educator, clergyman and politician
- Yashwantrao Chavan, 71, Indian independence activist and politician
- Eluned Woodford-Williams, 71, British geriatrician

=== 26 ===
- Jóhann K. Pétursson, 71, Icelandic circus performer and actor, accidental fall

=== 27 ===
- Asit Baran, 71, Indian actor and singer
- Alby Black, 76, Australian rugby league footballer
- Luc Étienne, 76, French writer and a proponent of 'pataphysics
- Josef Grunner, 80, German politician
- George Howard, Baron Howard of Henderskelfe, 64, British landowner, soldier, and peer
- M. N. Govindan Nair, 73, Indian communist politician
- Bernard Quaife, 85, English first-class cricketer
- Charles Willumsen, 66, Danish rower

=== 28 ===
- Adam Antes, 93, German sculptor and graphic artist
- Duncan Carmichael, 69, English cricketer
- Johnny Hunt, 81, Australian rugby league player
- František Jandl, 79, Czech equestrian and Olympian
- Jan B. Jansen, 86, Norwegian physician, anatomist and scientist
- Vilho Siivola, 74, Finnish actor, film director, and television director
- Hans Speidel, 87, German military officer
- Paul F. Yount, 76, United States Army general

=== 29 ===
- Bill Cunningham, 84, New Zealand cricketer
- Nora Thompson Dean, 77, Indigenous American (Lenape) linguist
- Franz Jáchym, 74, Austrian prelate of the Roman Catholic Church
- Wincenty Kowalski, 92, Polish military commander
- Dorothea Macnee, 88, British socialite
- T. Subrahmanian Thirumump, 78, Indian poet, freedom fighter, and communist leader

=== 30 ===
- Christopher Adler, 30, American lyricist and theatre director
