= Vasile Moldoveanu =

Romanian tenor (born 1935)

Vasile Moldoveanu (born 6 October 1935) is a Romanian tenor.

== Biography ==
He was born in Constanța. After attending the Mircea cel Bătrân High School in his native city, Moldoveanu studied voice at the "Ciprian Porumbescu" University of Music in Bucharest under the supervision of the tenor Dinu Bădescu, as a student in the class prepared by Octav Enigărescu. His debut was at the Romanian Opera in Bucharest on 9 January 1966; he played Arlecchino in Pagliacci by Ruggero Leoncavallo.

His career in Romania was relatively short: he performed at the Romanian Opera for seven seasons between 1966 and 1971. He sang in 22 operas, mainly in secondary roles, but also in main roles such as Rinuccio (Gianni Schicchi), Rodolfo (La bohème), Il Duca di Mantova (Rigoletto), Ernesto (Don Pasquale), and Tamino (Die Zauberflöte, which was his last performance in Romania, on 23 June 1972). He also appeared in secondary roles on the first opera LPs from Electrecord,(La traviata, Samson et Dalila and Carmen).

In 1971 he was invited by the Viktor Vladarski and Friedrich Pasch agencies to a series of auditions in Germany. After initial difficulties in obtaining a visa because he was not a member of the Romanian Communist Party, he arrived in Germany in 1972 and decided not to return to Romania. The authorities started an inquiry and he was sentenced to the death penalty in his absence, his refusal to return to the country during a "mission of representation of the Romanian state" being interpreted as treason. After the relevant penal code was modified in 1973, the case was heard again in his absence, and he was sentenced to five years imprisonment and seizure of property.

== International career ==
In 1972, Moldoveanu made his first international appearance as Manrico in Il trovatore at the Regensburg Opera. Then, in Amsterdam, he was Rodolfo (La bohème), followed by Il Duca di Mantova (Rigoletto) at the St. Gallen Opera. His debut at the Vienna State Opera was Alfredo (La traviata) in 1973; he returned in 1987 as Des Grieux (Manon Lescaut). In 1973, he also appeared for the first time as Don Carlos in Verdi's homonymous opera, a role he would sing more than 75 times during his career.

In 1974 he signed a four-year-contract with the Stuttgart Opera, managed at that time by Wolfgang Windgassen. He sang in numerous productions there, including Lucia di Lammermoor, La bohème, Un ballo in maschera and La traviata. In 1976 he was cast in Rigoletto, directed by Roman Polanski, at the Bavarian State Opera. Singing in Düsseldorf, Stuttgart, München, Berlin and Ludwigsburg, Moldoveanu was discovered by Nelly Walter, vice-president of Columbia Artists Management, who became his manager for eleven years and who proposed him at the Metropolitan Opera in New York. In 1979, he made his debut at Covent Garden, London, in Don Carlos, directed by Luchino Visconti.

In 1977, Moldoveanu was named Kammersänger by the Stuttgart Opera.

His first appearance at the Metropolitan Opera took place on 19 May 1977, during a tour of the company in Minneapolis, Minnesota. He appeared as Rodolfo in La bohème, with Mimi played by Renata Scotto, with whom he was to sing in several operas. At the Metropolitan, he sang in 105 performances, more than any other Romanian tenor; he is also the Romanian opera singer with the most presences in a main role after World War II. By way of comparison, during the same years that Moldoveanu sang at the Met (1977-1986), Luciano Pavarotti had 100 appearances and Plácido Domingo 149.

He sang ten parts at the Metropolitan Opera, and was broadcast live on TV in Don Carlo (1980), Il tabarro (1981) and Simon Boccanegra (1984). In addition, he sang Arrigo in I Vespri Siciliani, Turiddu in Cavalleria rusticana, Cavaradossi in Tosca, Rodolfo in La bohème, Des Grieux in Manon Lescaut, Duca di Mantova in Rigoletto and Pinkerton in Madama Butterfly. He reduced his activity in 1987, following a complicated surgery, and his last appearances in the United States were as Calaf (Turandot) and Des Grieux (Manon Lescaut) at the Denver Opera.

Moldoveanu returned to Europe and continued his career in Paris (Manon Lescaut in 1991 and 1993), Monaco (I Vespri siciliani and Aida), Nice (La fanciulla del West), Roma (Turandot), Lisbon (Manon Lescaut), Parma (Don Carlo), Pretoria, South Africa (Un ballo in maschera), and German cities including Stuttgart and Hamburg. Perhaps the only important opera house where he did not sing was Teatro alla Scala, Milano, although a role in I Vespri siciliani was discussed.

== Vocal characteristics and career ==
Moldoveanu's voice had a vibrant timbre, consistent with the characteristics of the lyric tenor that he considered himself. However, he had a steady and strong acute register, which allowed him to successfully approach roles more typically associated with spinto tenors (Calaf, Don Carlo, Don José, Manrico), as well as dramatic roles (Radames, Dick Johnson). His voice, sometimes compared to those of great past tenors such as Giovanni Martinelli and Franco Corelli, was supported by a slim figure and ardent eyes. These factors made him highly appreciated in some roles, such as Luigi from Il tabarro: after the TV broadcast of this performance, from the Met Opera, his fans and his colleagues started to address him as “Luigi”.

Although he had a significant career, especially at the Metropolitan Opera, and was promoted by the media in an age when live TV broadcasts had just begun, Moldoveanu is little known in Romania. This is due in particular to the censorship in place during the communist era, when he was at the height of his career.

In 2010, Moldoveanu appealed against the sentence that had sent him to jail and was absolutely discharged.

In 2012, he was made a commander of the Order of the Star of Romania.

Moldoveanu now lives in Monte Carlo. In 2013, he gave master classes for young singers in Romania.

== Recordings ==
Few recordings of Moldoveanu exist, though two LPs with opera arias were released by Intercord:

- Berühmte Tenor-Arien (1976)
- Neapolitan Songs (1978)

There are numerous live recordings of radio broadcasts from the Metropolitan Opera, including bootleg recordings.

== Video recordings ==
Unlike the studio recordings, Moldoveanu's videography is more consistent:

- Giuseppe Verdi: Don Carlo
  - Cast: Vasile Moldoveanu (Don Carlo); Renata Scotto (Elisabeth of Valois); Tatiana Troyanos (Princess of Eboli); Sherrill Milnes (Rodrigo, Marquis of Posa); Paul Plishka (Philip II); Jerome Hines (The Grand Inquisitor); Peter Sliker (A forester); Betsy Norden (Tebaldo); Dana Talley (The Count of Lerma); Barbara Greene (The Countess of Aremberg); John Cheek (A friar); Timothy Jenkins (A royal herald); Therese Brandson (A celestial voice)
  - Metropolitan Opera Orchestra and Chorus: James Levine (conductor); John Dexter (director)
  - Recorded live from the Metropolitan Opera in New York City, February 1980
- Giacomo Puccini: Il tabarro
  - Cast: Renata Scotto, Vasile Moldoveanu, Cornell Mc Neill, Charles Anthony, Italo Tajo, Bianca Berini, Jeffrey Stamm, Louisa Wohlafka, Michael Best
  - Metropolitan Opera Orchestra and Chorus: James Levine (conductor); Fabrizio Melano (director)
  - Based on recordings of the Metropolitan Opera in New York, November 1981
- Giuseppe Verdi: Simon Boccanegra
  - Cast: Anna Tomova-Sintow, Sherrill Milnes, Vasile Moldoveanu, Paul Plishka
  - Metropolitan Opera Orchestra and Chorus: James Levine (conductor); Tito Capobianco (artistic director)
  - Based on recordings of the Metropolitan Opera in New York, 1984
- Giuseppe Verdi: I vespri siciliani
  - Cast: Eduard Tumagian (Guido de Montforte), Alan Charles (Il Sire di Bethume), Jacques Doumene (Il Conte Vaudemont), Vasile Moldoveanu (Arrigo), Zenon Kosnowski (Giovanni da Procida), Maria Temesi (La Duchessa Elena), Linda Bond Perry (Ninetta), Michel Cambon (Danieli), Louis Mathieu (Tebaldo), Patrick Rocco (Roberto), Alain Munier (Manfredo)
  - The Orchestra of the Opera House in Nice: Oleg Caetani (conductor)
  - Recorded at the Opera House in Nice (15, 17, 19 and 23 June 1984)

== Bibliography ==
- Vasile Moldoveanu - Un tenor român pe patru continente - Ioana Diaconescu, Editura Muzicală, 2011, Bucharest
- Opera Română – deceniul cinci – 1961 - 1971 - Anca Florea, Editura Curtea Veche, 2006, Bucharest
- Opera Română – deceniul șase – 1971 - 1981 - Anca Florea, Editura DC, 2009, Bucharest.
- "Opera on Video - A Personal Review" - Michael Richter, 1997
