= Boutros el-Khoury =

Lebanese businessman, banker and industrialist

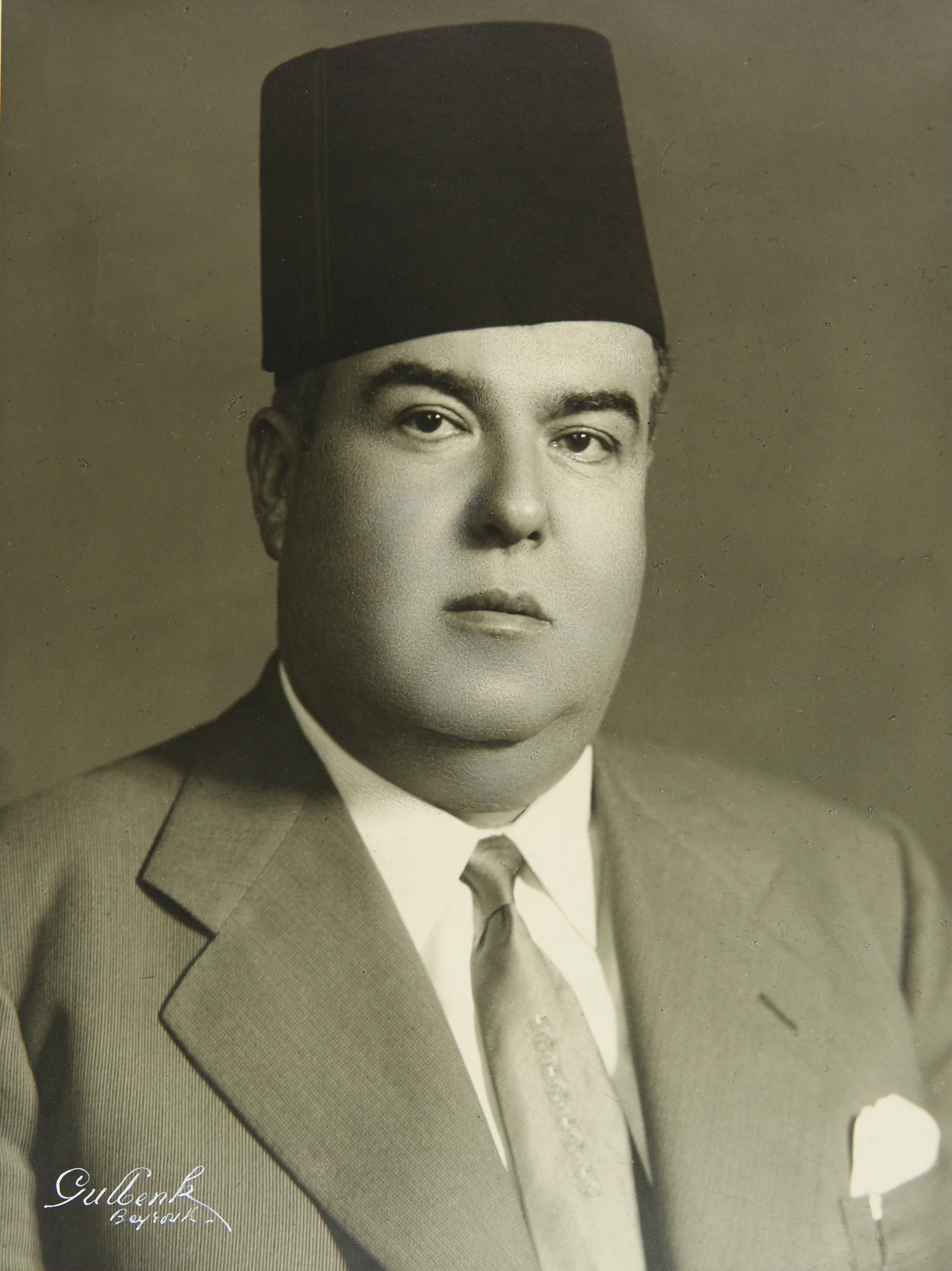
- Born: 1907; Karm Sadde, Zghorta, Mount Lebanon Mutasarrifate
- Died: 18 November 1984 (aged 76–77); Beirut, Lebanon
- Monuments: Karm Sadde (Lebanon)
- Occupations: Businessman, banker, politician, industrialist
- Spouse: Najibé Abboud
- Children: 7 children

Sheikh Boutros el-Khoury (Arabic: بطرس الخوري, 1907 – 18 November 1984) was a Lebanese businessman, banker and industrialist. Khoury managed to build a large commercial and industrial empire, and was one of Lebanon's most well-established businessmen from the 1950s to the 1970s. Khoury was an important figure of the Lebanese ruling elite in the second half of the 20th century. He played a decisive role in the development of economic legislation, and used his expertise in the resolution of several major national crises.

== Biography ==
=== Early life ===
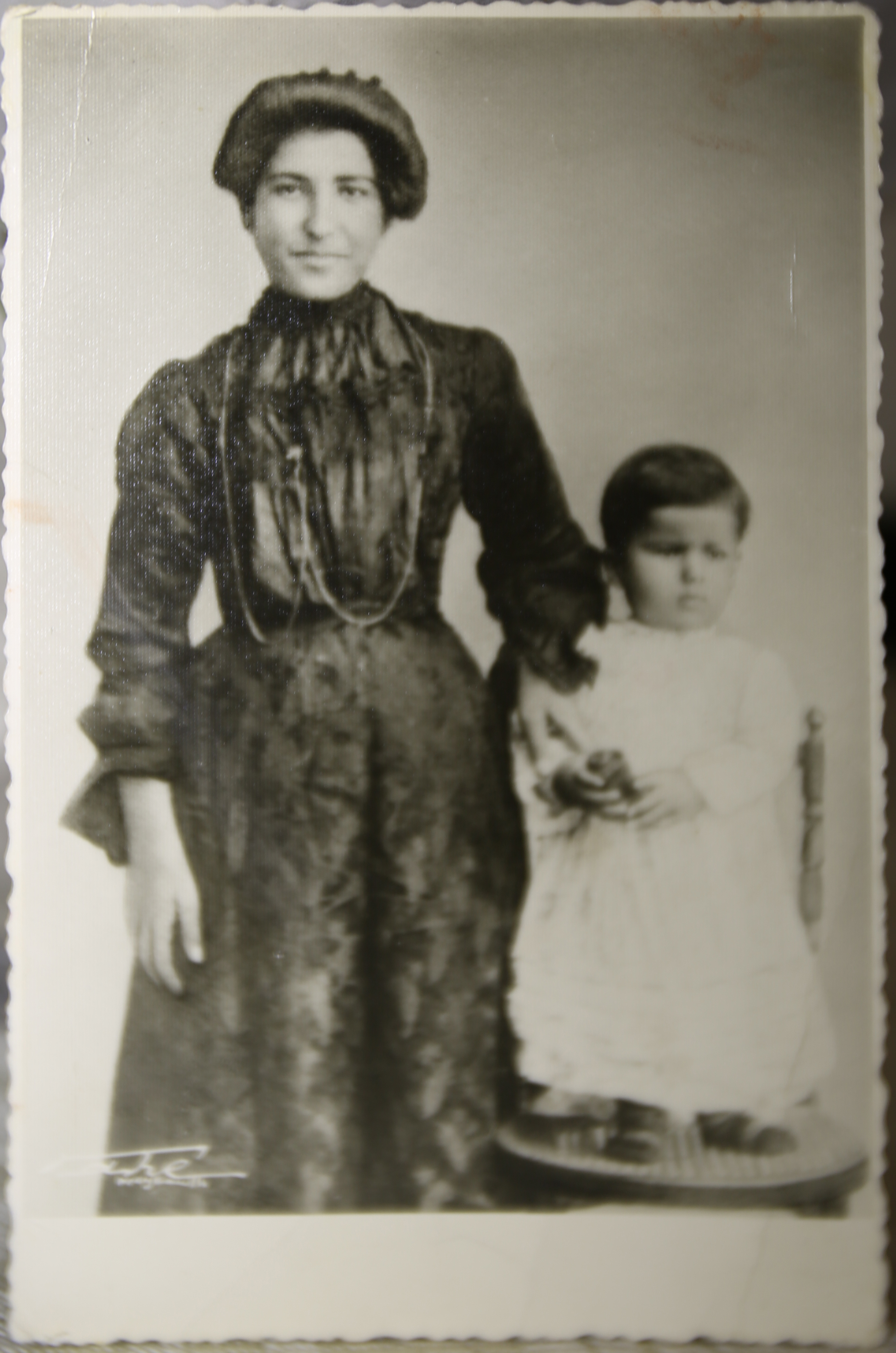
Boutros el-Khoury as a child, with his mother.

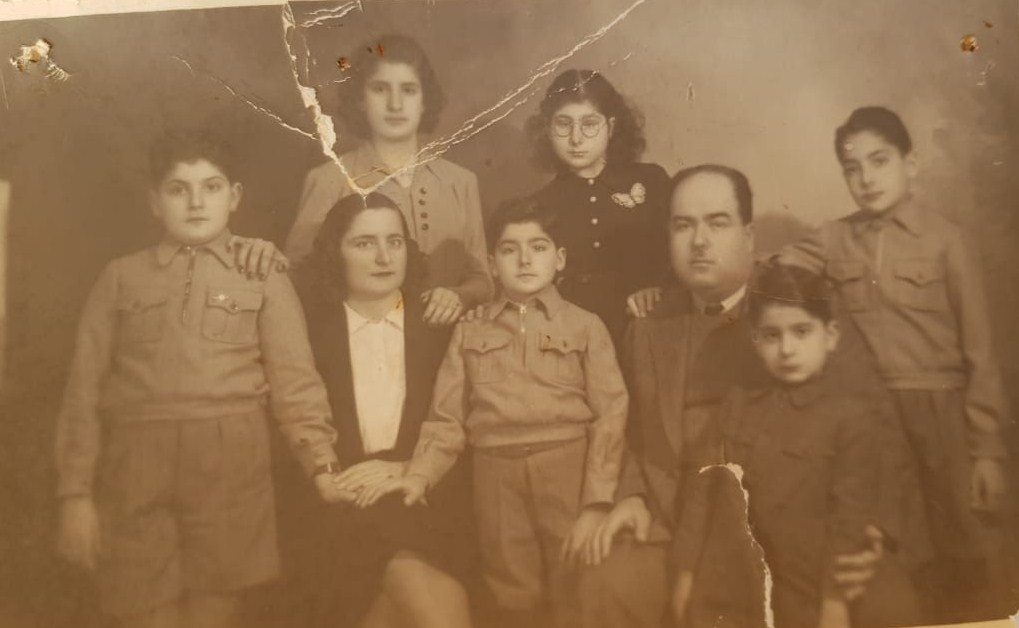
Boutros el-Khoury with his spouse and children.

Khoury was born in 1907 in the village of Karm Sadde, in the Zghorta District (North Lebanon), the son of Salim and Myriam el-Khoury. His family hailed from the Lebanese diaspora in the French colonies of West Africa, with some members, including his father, residing in Senegal. Khoury lost his parents at an early age: his father died abroad on the day he was born, while his mother died when he was three years old. Khoury was subsequently raised first by his grandparents and then by his paternal aunt, Sayde Khoury, while his father's uncle, Abbas Abboud, who resided in Senegal, supported him financially. It was Abboud who initiated Khoury to the world of business and commerce early on in his life.

=== Education ===
Khoury studied at the Mar Yaacoub school in his home village and graduated from the al-Alam school in the village of Daraya, Zghorta.

== Business career ==
Khoury pursued a career in business, and by the 1960s had become one of the wealthiest men in Lebanon thanks to his investments in various sectors of the economy.

Khoury's career began at the age of 20. He started out in the oil business, dividing his time between his home village and Tripoli until, the beginnings of the 1930s, he moved permanently to North Lebanon’s capital, where it was easier for him to run his business and broaden his contacts. He then shifted easily from trade to industry and conducted many successful partnerships with well-established businessmen in various fields, founding companies such as the Stephan and Khoury company (created with Joseph and Sayed Stephan of Kfarsghab), the Kfoury–Khoury company (founded with Al Kfoury from Khenchara, Metn District), the "Al Ghazzal Transports" with Ghattas el-Murr, and Fadel Al-Ghandour from Tripoli, among others.

=== La Kadisha ===
Over the course of the 1920s, Khoury gained a thorough understanding of financial investment. In accordance with the traditional role played at that time by the Lebanese diaspora in the country's economy, the young sheikh reinvested the money he received from his family abroad, including his great-uncle Abboud from Senegal, in various local businesses.

In this respect, his experience in the hydroelectric company "La Kadisha" highlighted early on his innate talents as a businessman. The company had been founded in 1924 by prominent figures in Bsharri, such as the Keirouz and Geagea families, with the Maronite Archbishop of Tripoli, Anthony Peter Arida, also playing an important role. Under the French Mandate, the company had obtained the concession to provide electricity from the Kadisha Valley to the rest of North Lebanon. First introduced into the company through his uncle Abbas, Khoury quickly rose through its ranks, and in 1929, at the age of 22, was elected to the administrative council. In 1929, La Kadisha merged with the Abu Ali hydroelectric plant, the power concession for which had been granted to the Stephan brothers. On 10 August 1930, Khoury was re-elected to the new council. He gradually acquired a majority stake in the company, until on 14 May 1953, he bought the majority of shares owned by the French shareholders of the companies La Pyrénéenne and La Toulousaine. He then became president of the company.

Khoury's years working in the administration of La Kadisha had a significant impact on his economic and political outlook. The economic thought of Albert Naccache, author of La Kadisha hydroelectric project, was especially influential. Naccache advocated greater industrial development in Lebanon, contrary to the widespread ideology at the time that was influenced by the ideas of Michel Chiha, according to which Lebanon was a "merchant republic" devoid of any raw materials. Naccache called for the establishment of a large network of hydroelectric power plants across the country that would be financed and managed entirely by Lebanese capital and executives. This experience gave Khoury a taste for industrial adventure and contributed to his grander vision for the national economy.

=== Agriculture ===
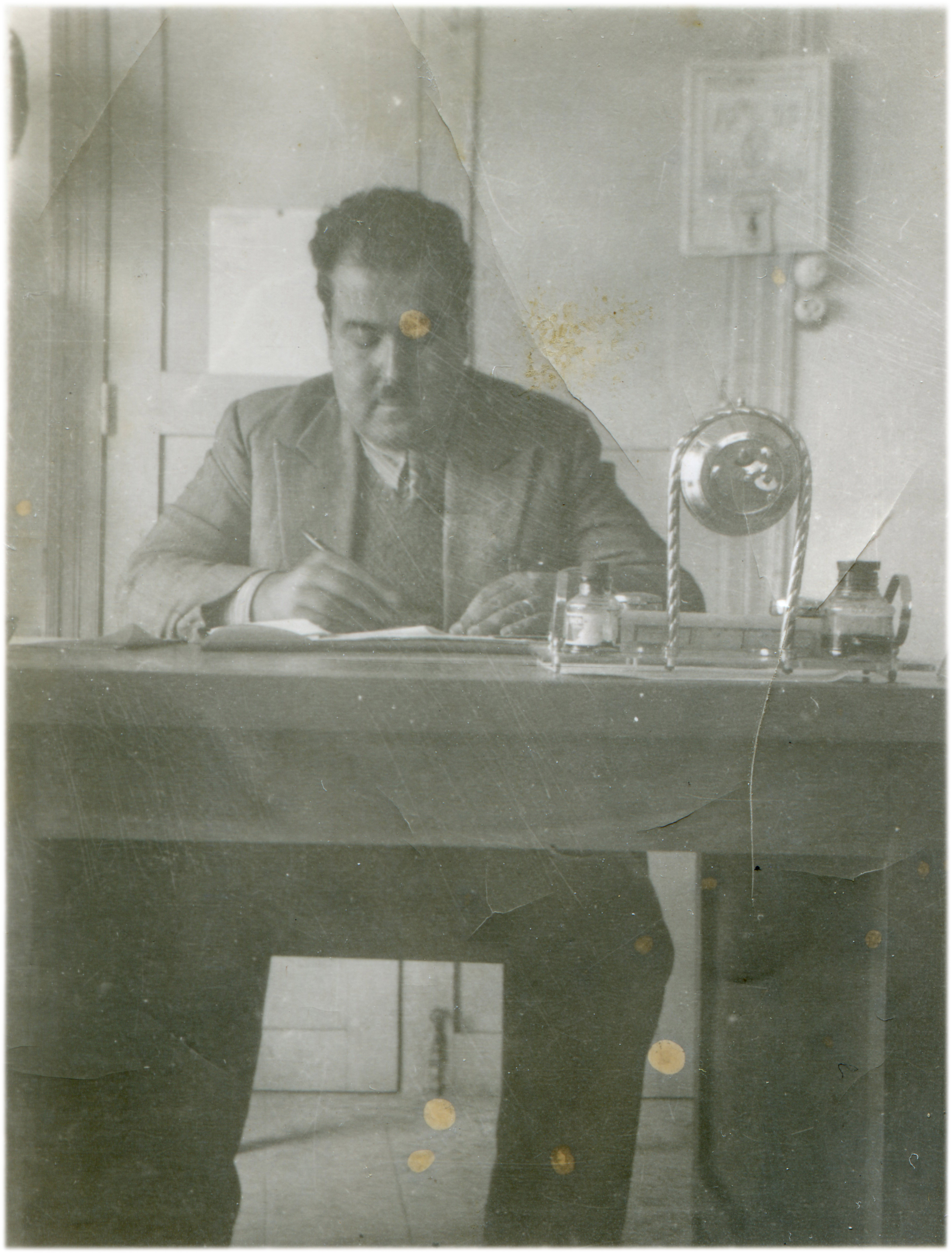
The young Sheikh Boutros el-Khoury.

Khoury's interest in agriculture also began at an early age, due to his rural upbringing. He started trading in agricultural products, beginning with olive oil, which he sold through North Lebanon before committing to the purchase and resale of flour and wheat to the whole of Lebanon. From the late 1940s onward, he negotiated the cost price per kilogram of both flour and wheat with the Ministry of National Economy. His concern for the agricultural industry and the rural world was evident from the start of his parliamentary career: He was elected as head of the Commission of Agriculture and Food Supply for two consecutive terms in 1946 and 1947, as well as head of the Commission of Public Works in 1947.

In the 1950s, Khoury became involved in the fight against the monopolization of staple foods and rising prices and became one of the leading figures in the world of trade. He was often consulted by authorities in times of national emergency. During the 1958 Lebanon crisis, he belonged to the group of traders that sounded the alarm about the paralysis of commercial activity in the country, and publicly encouraged the unloading of boats in the Port of Beirut to avoid food shortages.

In addition to his involvement in the wheat trade, Khoury also revolutionized sugar production in Lebanon. In 1963, in his capacity as representative of sugar refiners, he advised Prime Minister of Lebanon Rashid Karami on the measures to be taken to meet the country's sugar requirements for the following year. His suggestion was to encourage the production of sugar beet, almost nonexistent in Lebanon at the time, in order to boost domestic output and allow the country to move towards self-sufficiency in sugar production. He was also one of the largest shareholders in the Anjar sugar factory, playing a key role in the resolution of the sugar beet crisis that lasted from December 1964 to June 1965 and which saw the Bekaa peasants clashing with the management of the factory itself.

Khoury's stature and position as a prominent industrialist made him inclined to a traditional and benevolent social paternalism towards the peasants. To help Lebanese farmers and combat rural exodus, he was actively involved with the Banque de Crédit Agricole, Industriel et Foncier (BCAIF), founded in 1954, becoming chairman in 1958. During the banana crisis caused by the violent storm of 20 November 1964, which destroyed production for an entire season, Khoury offered long-term loans to banana growers in order to alleviate their difficulties.

=== Industry and commerce ===
Khoury was one of the pillars of Lebanese industry during the second half of the 20th century, and he was a keen supporter of investment of Lebanese capital in the industrial sector, which he advocated as a means of increasing the national income and curbing unemployment. He was also president of the Association of Industrialists from 1965 to 1975, and called for the establishment of a Ministry of Industry.

Khoury's first industrial ventures were in the electricity sector. He invested at an early stage in the La Kadisha company, and in 1948 founded another hydroelectric company, Al-Bared, with two other partners. Through these two companies, Khoury helped to solve the electricity crisis that plagued Lebanon between 1952 and 1954. He proposed linking Beirut to the networks of Qadisha, Nahr el-Bared and Nahr al-Jaouz to overcome the power cuts in the capital, with Al-Bared handling the operation. In an effort to strengthen the energy sector, he demanded in 1956 a government loan of £L5 million to La Kadisha in order to avoid an increase in electricity tariffs.

Khoury was also involved in the cement industry. In 1963, he became a shareholder in the Lebanese Cement Company, founded in 1929 by the Maronite Patriarchate in Chekka, having supplied its factories with electricity through the Al-Bared company since 1956.

In 1952, through several companies founded in conjunction with various business partners from Tripoli Khoury helped establish a free zone in the Port of Tripoli, building port facilities and warehouses and supplying the necessary machinery for the transfer of goods. This expanded the port significantly, as well as strengthening North Lebanese industry in general. He then founded several import–export companies with his partners to encourage trade and transit operations, which inevitably led him to become more closely involved in the maritime transport sector. He became a ship owner and founded the Maritime Boutros S. El-Khoury Agency in the 1960s.

Khoury also invested in numerous other areas, founding or co-founding over 50 companies both in Lebanon and abroad. Sectors to which he contributed included aluminum and pressed wood production, the petroleum industry, the drinks industry (notably juices and sparkling water), the hospitality industry (hotels), the insurance sector, and the land and real estate industry.

=== Banking ===
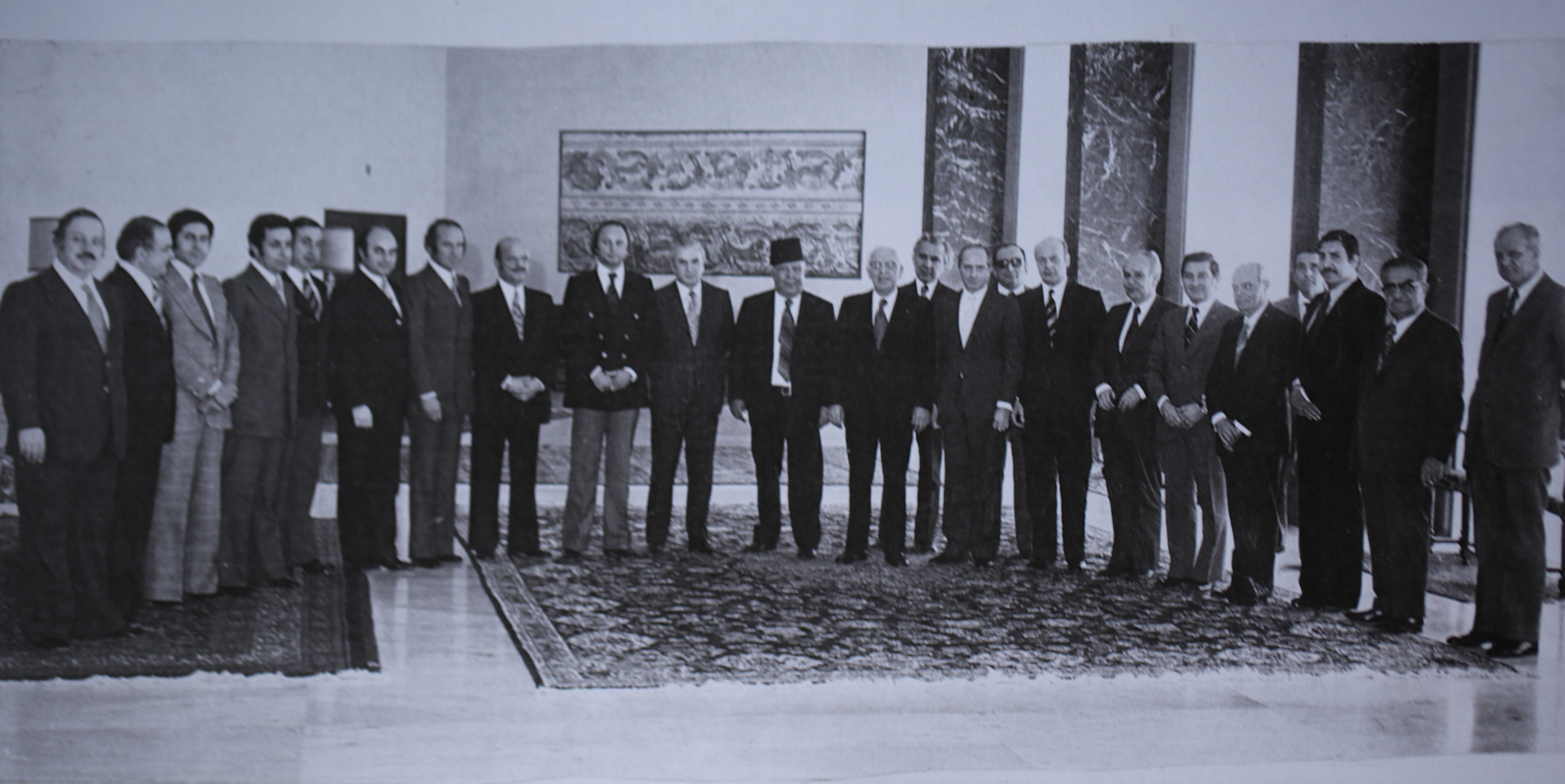
The Association of Lebanese Industrialists with Lebanese President Suleiman Frangieh.

Khoury's involvement in the Lebanese banking sector contributed to the emergence of the "Golden Age" in the domestic banking industry in the 1950s. He became one of the main figures of the Lebanese banking sector, alongside people like Pierre Edde, Hussein Al Oweini and Philippe Takla. In addition to his role in the BCAIF, which played a leading role in the economic affairs of the country, he also participated in the establishment of many banking institutions, including the project "Bank Al-Ahli Al-Mahjar", which never took shape but whose purpose was to link the capitals of the diaspora to those of the motherland. Following the same principle, the BLOM Bank (Banque du Liban et d’Outre-Mer) was created a year later in 1951. The Sheikh was one of its founders, also serving as its vice-president. BLOM Bank remains one of the leading banks in Lebanon. He was also one of the founders of Al-Madina Bank, established in 1982. He was a shareholder in the Bank of Industry and Labor and invested momentarily funds in Al-Mahjar Bank and Bank of the Mediterranean (Banque de la Méditerranée) in the 1980s.

The success of BLOM attracted Arab and foreign capital to the institution. In May 1960, Khoury secured a US$5 million loan for the BCAIF, largely through his personal negotiations with Hart Perry, director of the American Bank Institution known as the Credit Fund. Also through the BCAIF, he led similar negotiations on behalf of the Lebanese government to obtain a US wheat loan in 1964, efforts which resulted in the agreement of a $17 million deal in July 1966. The Sheikh also maintained relations with leading personalities in the international banking community, including David Rockefeller, adviser to the World Bank.

In his capacity as chairman of the BCAIF's board of directors, Khoury also worked closely with the Lebanese government in efforts to alleviate problems in the banking sector. In 1964, he chaired the banking consortium that regulated the resolution of the "Land Bank" crisis. He was also involved in the 1966 project to establish a Development Bank, for the financing of industrial and tourism projects. Additionally, he was a key figure in the resolution of the "Intra-banking crisis" of 1968, during which Lebanon's central bank, the Banque du Liban (BDL), asked the BCAIF to handle the management and liquidation of 10 banks in distress.

=== Contribution to social dialogue ===
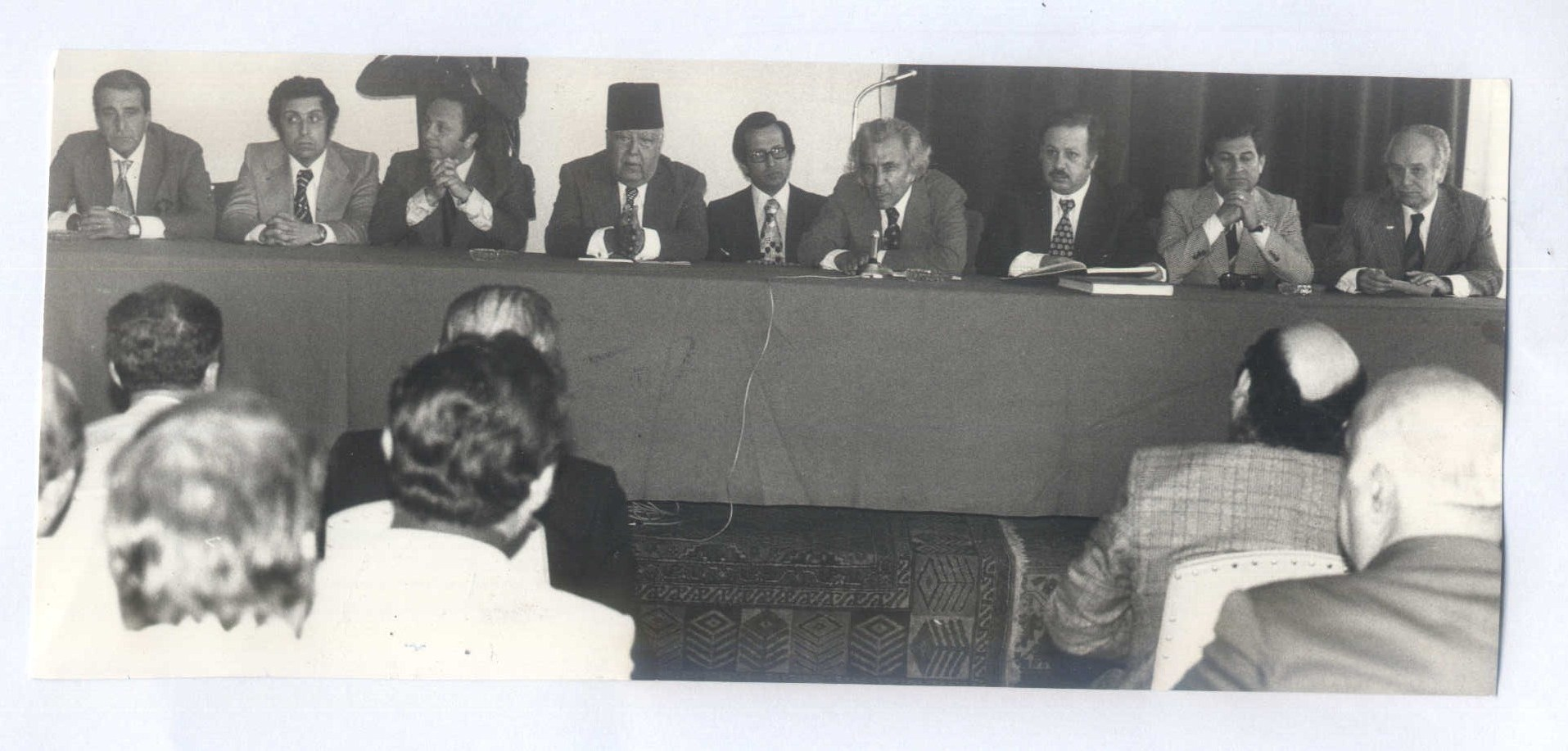
Boutros el-Khoury at the press conference of the Association of Lebanese Industrialists.

Khoury's role in the Lebanese business world gave him a decisive voice in the dialogue that emerged between trade unionists and managers in the second half of the 1960s. As a representative of the industrialists, he was commonly invited by the ruling class to participate in the settlement of social crises. While usually chosen to represent the employers in these discussions, Khoury often adopted a conciliatory position, reflecting his role as a mediator in both politics and business.

On the question of wage increases in the private sector, demanded by unions as early as November 1964, Khoury welcomed the adoption in January 1965 of the wage increase law, which in his opinion guaranteed continued cooperation between employers and workers, as well as increasing living standards.

Khoury was also committed to improving worker productivity, providing funds for vocational training and collaborating with the Ministry of Labor and Social Affairs on the modernization of the Dekwaneh accelerated vocational training center.

Khoury's conciliatory tendencies did not outweigh his economic liberalism, however, and while he was sensitive to worker well-being, he believed that the state should also work in the interests of employers in order to improve the whole economic sector. He remained a proponent of free trade, which also led him to defend the interests of industrialists and capitalists. During the fruit crisis of June 1966, he condemned the measures of the Union of Farmers—defended by Kamal Jumblatt and the leftist parties—as an attempt to nationalize the fruit industry.

== Political activity ==
Khoury's social skills and talents as a mediator also served him well in his political career. He established himself at an early age as an influential figure in his home village of Karm Sadde, and received as a consequence the honorary title of "Sheikh". He was therefore elected mayor of the village at a very young age.

Khoury's reputation, in North Lebanon and across the country, grew as a result of his business successes and growing leadership skills, along with his participation in the Lebanese independence movement led by Bechara El Khoury against the French Mandate. He rapidly became established as an important political leader in Zghorta, and was elected member of the Lebanese Parliament from 1943 to 1947. He showed little interest in a purely political career, however, retiring from parliament and instead adopting a role as an advisor and mediator in political circles.

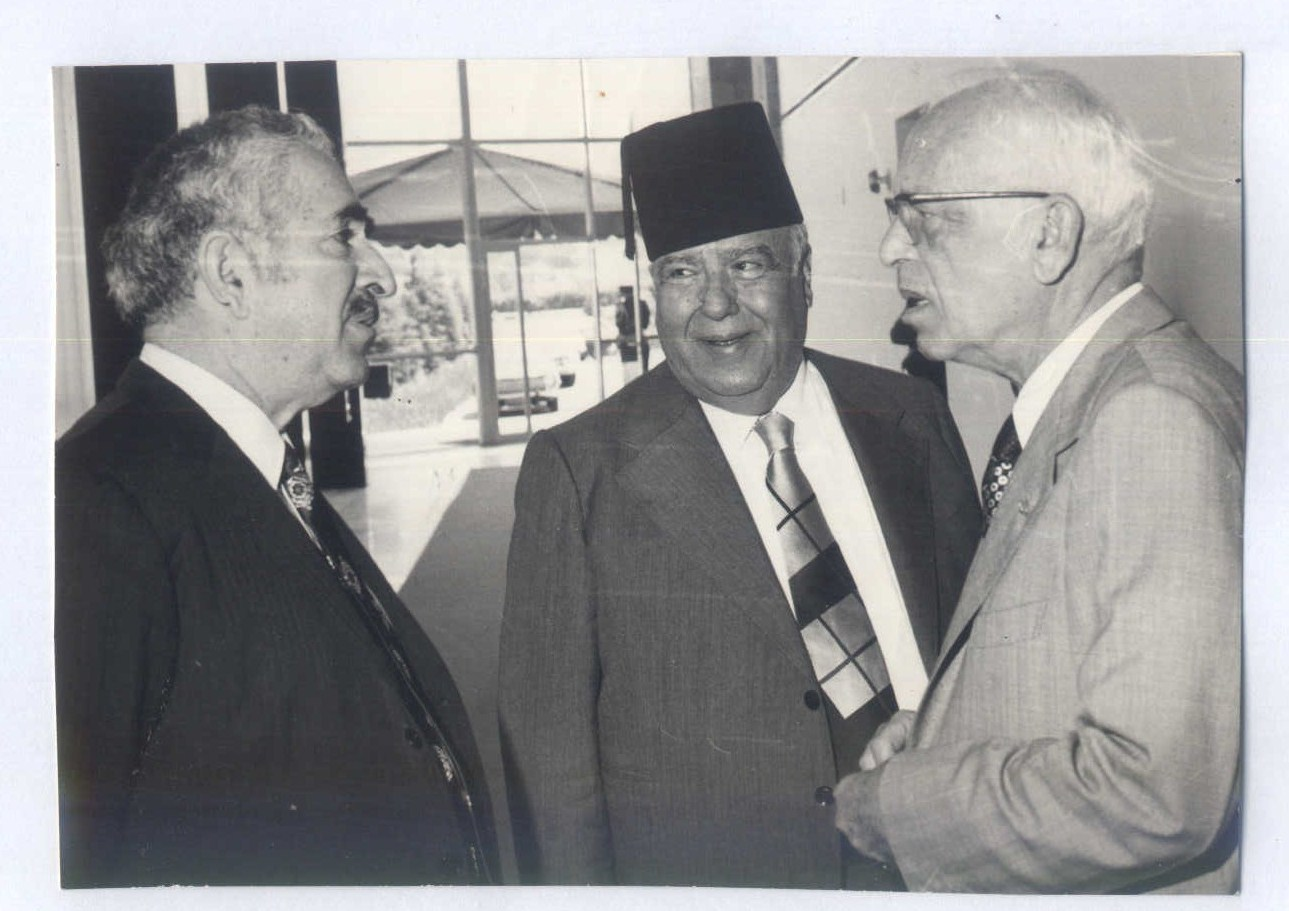
El-Khoury with Lebanese President Suleiman Frangieh and Lebanese Prime Minister Rachid Karami.

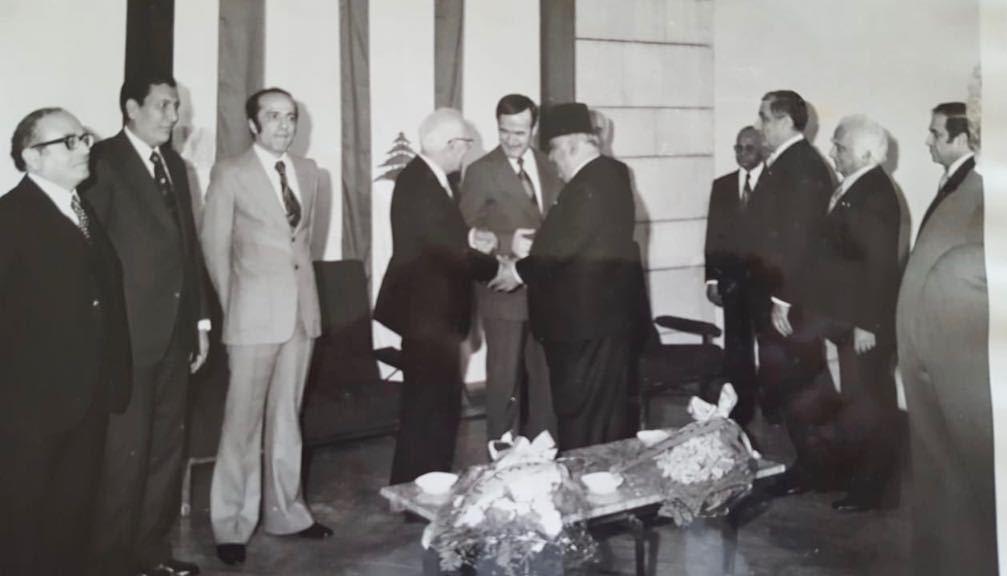
El-Khoury with Lebanese President Suleiman Frangieh and Syrian President Hafez al-Assad on 7 January 1975.

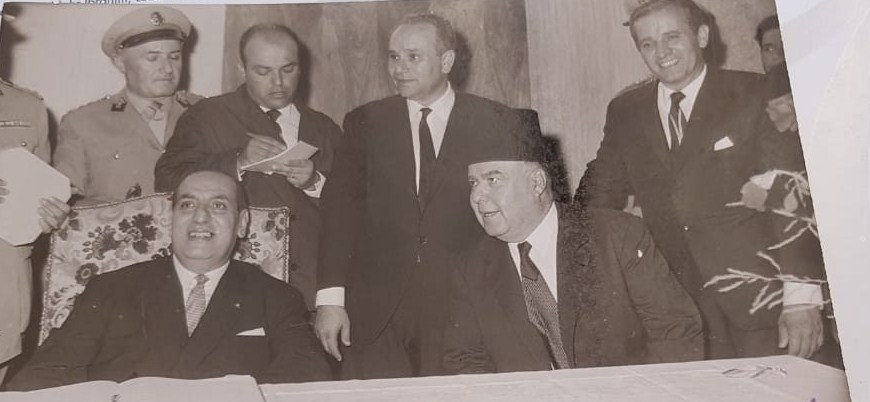
El-Khoury with Lebanese President Charles Helou.

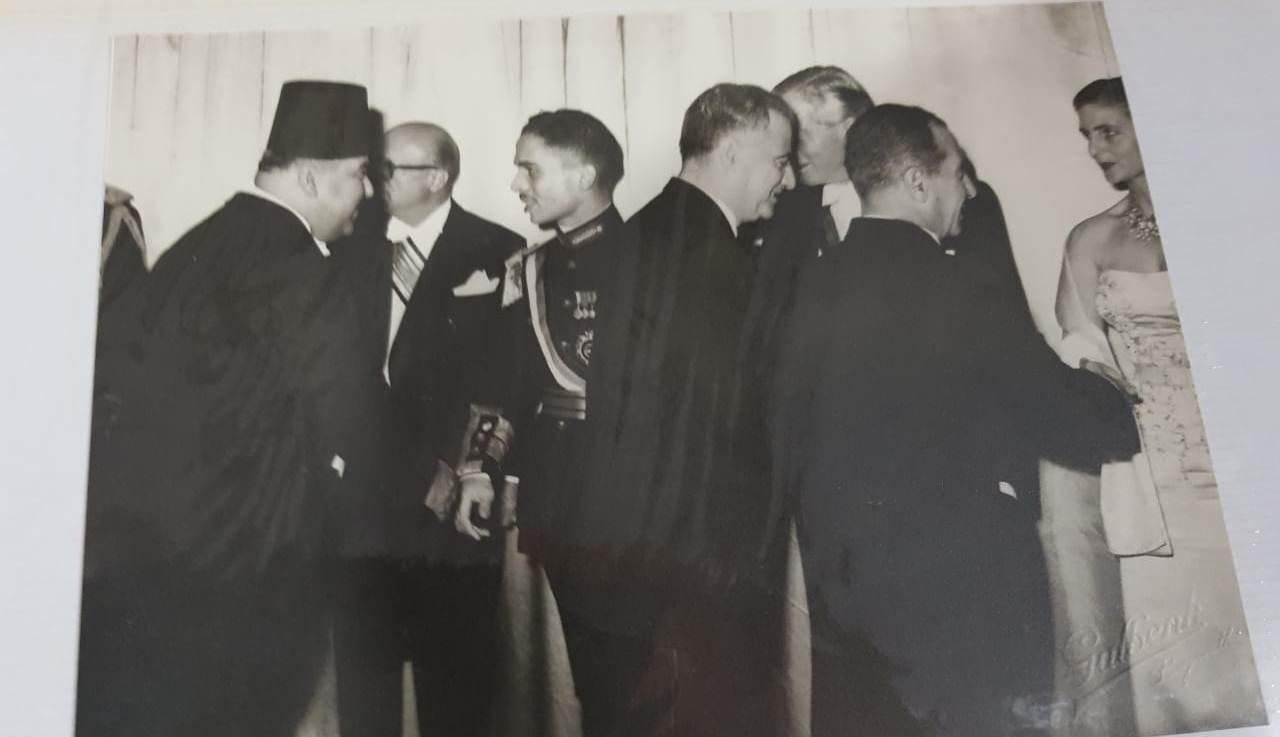
El-Khoury greeting King of Jordan Hussein.

Khoury built strong ties with Lebanon's most prominent post-independence political figures, including Camille Chamoun, Fouad Chehab, Rashid Karami, Charles Helou, Suleiman Frangieh and Elias Sarkis. He often acted as an intermediary and conciliator between different factions, holding frequent social events to this end at either his residence or St. George's Hotel in Beirut. His prominence and influence in political circles earned him the title of "the man and friend of all regimes.”

Khoury's political connections also afforded him various business advantages, thanks in large part to the government contracts he was able to obtain. In 1964, in close cooperation with Lebanese President Fouad Chehab, he negotiated with the United States a US$25 million wheat loan. Contracts such as this gave Khoury the opportunity to play a decisive role in the country's political economy.

=== The 1974 crisis and civil war ===
Khoury's authority and influence within both the economic and the political establishment was particularly evident during the social crisis of 1974 and the subsequent Lebanese civil war.

The social unrest that shook the country in the early 1970s was driven in part by the activities of the General Confederation of Lebanese Workers (Confédération Générale des Travailleurs Libanais, CGTL). The CGTL protested against the deterioration of living conditions, and in June 1974 presented the government with a list of demands, which included the amendment of Article 50 of the Labor Code, authorizing arbitrary dismissal. In response, the president of the Association of Industrialists resigned on 11 July 1974 to signify his total rejection of trade union demands, and refused any negotiation, a move that prolonged the crisis considerably.

Khoury's position during this conflict was in line with that of the rest of the Lebanese business world, traditionally committed to private initiative and individual and contractual freedom, which were endorsed by the constitution. His commitment to the Lebanese Front during the civil war was thus consistent with his pre-1975 stance: he financed the purchase of weapons used by the Al-Tanzim militia and Camille Chamoun's National Liberal Party, which were fighting the Islamist-progressive militias calling for reforms in the economic and political spheres.

== Charity Work ==
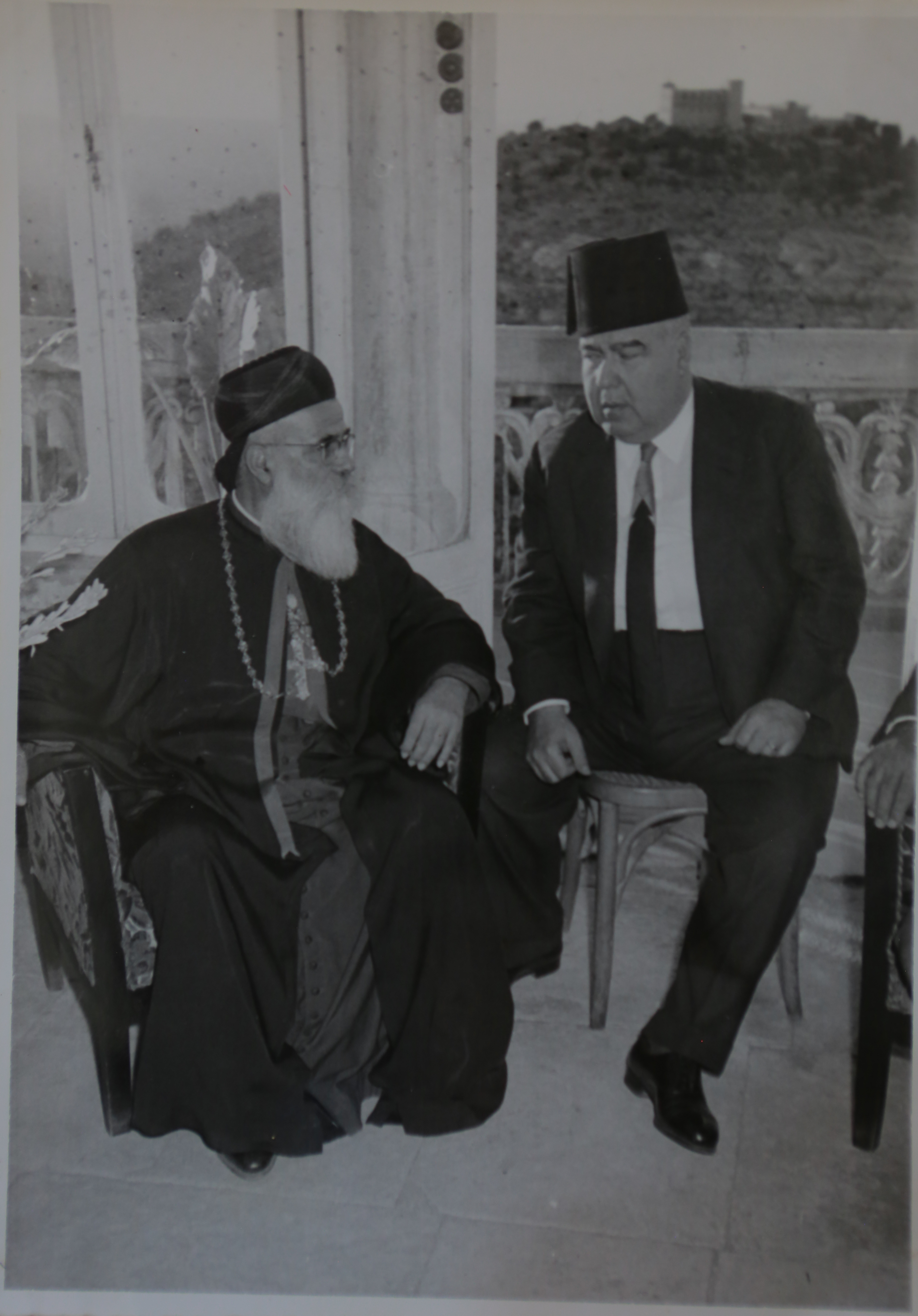
Sheikh Boutros El-Khoury with the Maronite Archbishop of Tripoli Antoine Abed at El-Khoury's residence. Mar Yaacoub monastery in the background.

Khoury was also renowned for his philanthropic activities and generous donations to charity. He was always committed to help in times of humanitarian crisis or natural hazards and used his influence for fundraising purposes: during the floods of North Lebanon on 22 December 1955, he participated in the committee of dignitaries organizing the relief efforts in Tripoli. Similarly, he was one of the first to donate money during the earthquake of 16 March 1956, which affected the Chouf and South Lebanon regions, and formed a committee to organize fundraising among industrialists. In March 1960, he donated to the Red Cross for the benefit of the victims of the Agadir earthquake. In 1974, he became a member of the National Committee for Victims of Cyprus.

== Personal life ==
Khoury married Najibe Abboud, a relative of his mentor Abbas, on 19 September 1926. The couple had seven children.

== Death and legacy ==
Khoury died in 1984 in Beirut at the age of 77. Khoury has since become established in Lebanese collective memory as the quintessential self-made man, due to his rural origins and his impressive social ascent during his work in Tripoli, Lebanon and Beirut. His legacy has been examined in various books, both fiction and non-fiction. Similarly, a commemorative statue was erected in his home village of Karm Sadde to honor him.

Khoury was also known for wearing the tarboush, which became his trademark, both in the newspapers and in the political cartoons made of him by the famous Lebanese cartoonist Pierre Sadek. He was also known for his great sense of humor.

== Organizations ==
- Member of the Beirut Traders' Association from 1956
- Member of the Beirut Chamber of Commerce and Industry from 1971
- President of the Industrialists Association (1965–1975); later Honorary chairman (1975–1984)
- President of the economic organizations in the 1970s
- Treasurer of the Maronite League in 1966, which confirmed his status of zai’m within the Christian community.

== Awards and distinctions ==
In total, Sheikh Boutros el-Khoury received 9 decorations, including:

Cross Diploma of the Commander of the French Republic, for social and humanitarian services (1953)
Officer of the National Order of the Cedar (1955)
Grand Officer of the National Order of the Cedar (1975)

== List of companies ==
=== Foundation ===
- Entreprise "Stephan et Khoury»
- Société pour la vente d'olives
- Société d’huiles "AsaadJabr»
- Société des forces hydro-électriques "Al-Bared»
- Société industrielle du levant s.a.l. "Bakalianflourmills»
- Société des usines de raffinerie du sucre s.a.l
- Société des usines du sucre Liban s.a.l
- Société de raffinerie du sucre –Behsas
- Société de transport de l’énergie électrique
- La société du bois compressé
- La société "Boutros El-Khoury et Hachem Ghandour»
- Compagnie Libanaise d'Acier " Ghandour »
- Fabrique Libanaise de SINALCO et D’Eau Gazeuze
- La société Arabo- Européenne d’Assurances et de réassurances – AROPE SAL
- La société "Kfoury-Khoury»
- Société Libanaise d'agrumes et de jus de fruits
- "BELKOU Real Estate" et "BELKOU Holding»
- ESSO FERTILIZER
- Société des Industries Pétrochimiques
- La Compagnie de Navigation Maritime Libanaise – Lebanese Shipping CO.S.A.l
- Société OCAL S.A.L
- Société Sunny Beach

=== Contribution ===
- La Société des Ciments Libanais
- La Société Holcim (Liban) S.A.L.
- La Kadisha – Société anonyme d’électricité du Liban Nord S.A.L.
- Société Phénicienne des forces hydro- électriques de " Nahr-Ibrahim »
- "INTRA" Investment Company
- La compagniei mmobilière libanaise "CIL»
- Banorabe Holding s.a.
- Banquebanorient – Paris
- Port Building 1340
- La Société Nationale de la zone franche de Tripoli
- Compagnie de Gestion et d'exploitation du port de Beyrouth
- Société foncière du port de Beyrouth s.a.l.
- Société Francaise pour le pétrole s.a.
- ALUMINIUM SIAL
- Casino du Liban SCAL (Lebanese anonymous concessionary company)
- Casino de Madrid
- Tabarja Beach
- La société de Tourisme et d'hiver Faraya – Mazar
- La Compagnie immobilière SAINT CHARLES
- Société LIQUIGAZ Liban s.a.l.
- Société SASS – France
- PARK HOTEL – Chtaura
- La société "Transports Al Ghazzal»
- Société IMPEX
- Société SOFIM s.a.l
- Société Hotel Rabieh Marine s.a.l.
- Rabiya Real Estate Co.S.A.L.
- Société Conserva Liban s.a.l.
- La Société des Hotȇls Modernes
- Forresta Houston – United States

== List of banks ==
=== Foundation ===
- Banque du Liban et d’Outre-Mer (BLOM Bank)
- Banque de Crédit Agricole, Industriel et Foncier (BCAIF)
- Al-Madina Bank
- Projet banquaire "Al-Ahli Al-Mahjar»

=== Contribution ===
- Banque de la méditérranée s.a.l. (Bankmed s.a.l.)
- Banque d’Industrie et du Travail
- Byblos Bank

== Bibliography ==
- Andrew Arsan, Interlopers of Empire: The Lebanese Diaspora in Colonial French West Africa, Oxford University Press, New York, 2014.
- Alice Boustany Djermakian, Une saga Libanaise : La famille Kettaneh, Éditions de la Revue Phénicienne, Beyrout, 2016.
- Hicham Saffiedine, Economic Sovereignty and the Fetters of Finance: The Making of Lebanon's Central Bank, PhD Thesis, Toronto, 2015, p. 157.
- Liban: géographie, économie, histoire et politique, Encyclopedia Universalis, ebook, Octobre 2015.
- Nicolas Nassif, Second Bureau, governor in the shadows, p. 346.
- Mohammad Zaiter, The Maronite project in Lebanon, its origins and developments, p. 673
- Fawaz Traboulsi, Social classes and political power in Lebanon, Dar El Saki, p. 103
