= Mircea cel Bătrân National College (Constanța) =

High school in Romania

Mircea cel Bătrân National College (Romanian: Colegiul Național "Mircea cel Bătrân" Constanța) is a high school located at 6 Ștefan cel Mare Street, Constanța, Romania. It was founded as a gymnasium on September 1, 1896 and took the name of Mircea the Elder in 1901.

At the 2024 evaluation of Romanian secondary schools, the college came in 9th place, with a score of 9.47/10.

== Faculty and alumni ==
=== Faculty ===
- Marin Ionescu Dobrogianu
- Nicholas Georgescu-Roegen
- Murat Iusuf

=== Alumni ===
- Haig Acterian
- Nicolae Bacalbașa
- Vasile Brînzănescu
- Pavel Chihaia
- Ion I. Cristea
- Petre T. Frangopol
- Marian-Traian Gomoiu
- Lucian Grigorescu
- Stere Gulea
- Ion Jalea
- Eugen Lumezianu
- Pericle Martinescu
- Nicolae N. Mihăileanu
- Vasile Moldoveanu
- Krikor Pambuccian
- Alexandru Pesamosca
- Ion Marin Sadoveanu
- Grigore Sălceanu
- Harry Tavitian
- Virgil Teodorescu
- Robert Petu
