= Gregory de Polnay =

English actor (1943–2026)

- Born: Gregory Peter Anthony de Polnay; 17 October 1943; Chelsea, London, England
- Died: 1 January 2026 (aged 82); Poitiers, France
- Education: Acting training at the London Academy of Music and Dramatic Art; speech training at the Central School of Speech and Drama
- Occupations: Actor; Director; Voice teacher

Gregory Peter Anthony de Polnay (17 October 1943 – 1 January 2026) was an English actor, director and voice teacher who was noted for his work on stage, radio and television both locally and in Australia.

== Life and career ==
=== Early life ===
Gregory de Polnay was born in Chelsea, County of London (now West London), England on 17 October 1943, the son of Hungarian-born English novelist Peter de Polnay and Margaret Mitchell Banks,

=== Career ===
De Polnay was probably best remembered for his role as Det. Sgt. Mike Brewer in the police procedural television series Dixon of Dock Green.

He was also a regular in the Australian television sitcom series, The Group (1971).

De Polnay's credits include: Space: 1999, Doctor Who (the serial The Robots of Death), Poldark, Enemy at the Door, Tenko, The Fourth Arm, One by One, Howards' Way and Boon.

He was an actor, director and voice teacher for nearly 40 years, working in all aspects of the theatre with several West End credits to his name and appearing with the RSC in his own production of You Can't Shut Out The Human Voice featuring Peggy Ashcroft and Ben Kingsley. He also had over 100 television appearances and 350 radio broadcasts to his name.

Due to an accident sustained while playing Malvolio in Twelfth Night at the Colorado Shakespeare Festival, the USA in 1987, de Polnay retrained as a voice specialist at the Royal Central School of Speech and Drama, where he gained the Advanced Diploma in Voice Studies and later on an MA at King's College London in Text and Performance Studies. Whilst being Head of Voice at the Drama Centre, London and at LAMDA, he has been a prominent member of staff at several major drama schools and has lectured on 'Language and Style' in the USA, Canada and South Africa.

During the past decade, de Polnay directed 21 Jacobean and Restoration plays for RADA. He was a drama advisor for the BBC World Service Classical Drama Series and has adapted several plays for the BBC World Service. When not directing, de Polnay worked for several organisations in the field of public speaking and communication skills, including his own business GdeP Associates Ltd in London. He coached several top television and sports presenters. De Polnay also worked extensively for RADA in Business providing communication and presentation skills training for a wide variety of business organisations. He was appointed Director of the RADA Shakespeare Certificate Scheme.

=== Death ===
De Polnay died in Poitiers, France on 1 January 2026, at the age of 82.
