= Nansen passport =

Travel documents for stateless persons

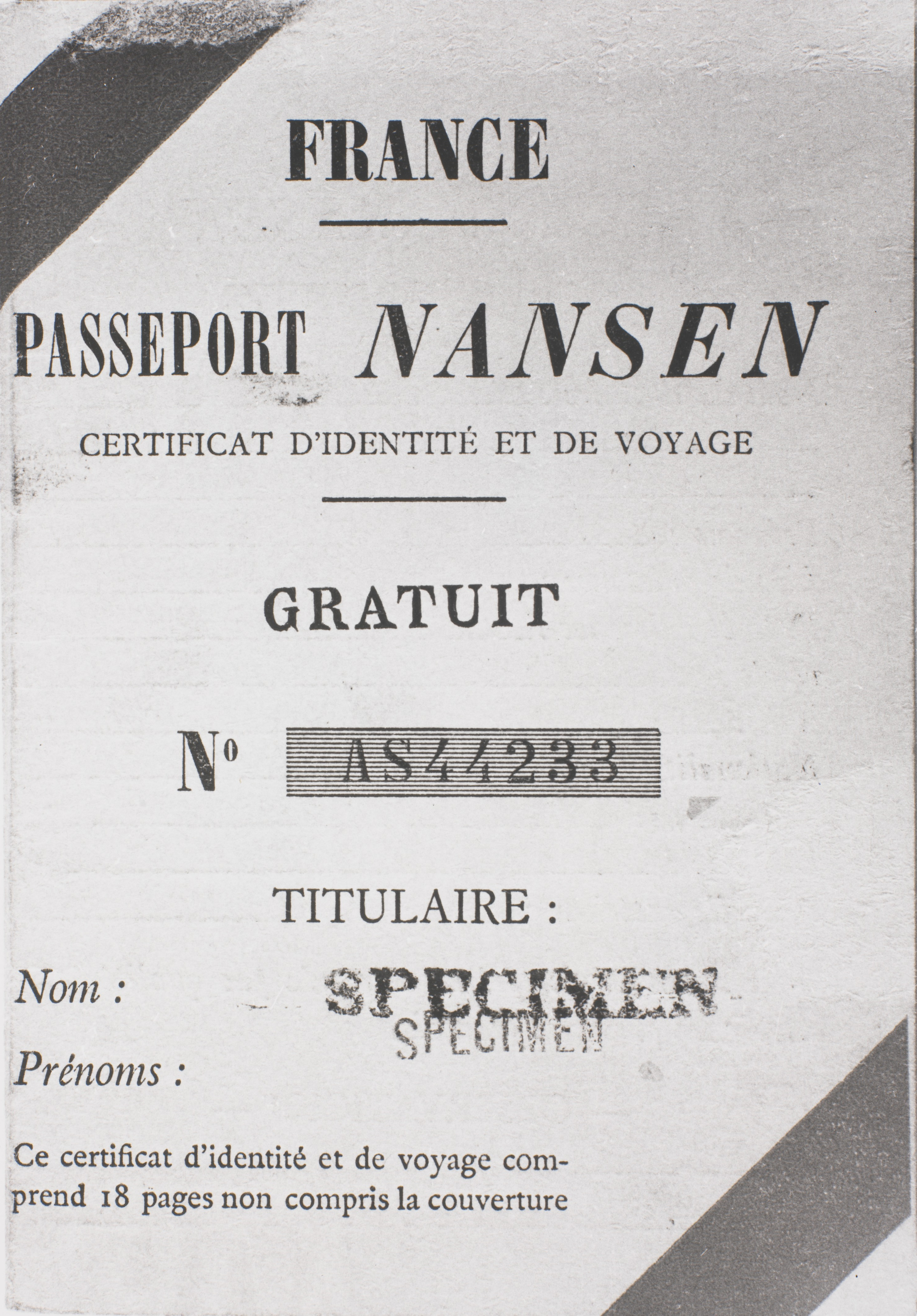
- The front cover of a Nansen passport (green stripe), written in French, the diplomatic language
- Type: Passport
- Issued by: League of Nations
- First issued: 1922
- Purpose: Identification
- Eligibility: Stateless refugees
- Expiration: 1938

Stateless persons passports were internationally recognized refugee travel documents from 1922 to 1938, first issued by the League of Nations's Office of the High Commissioner for Refugees to stateless refugees. They quickly became known as Nansen passports for their promoter, the Norwegian statesman and polar explorer Fridtjof Nansen.

== History ==
The end of World War I saw significant turmoil, leading to a refugee crisis. Numerous governments were toppled, and national borders were redrawn, often along generally ethnic lines. Civil war broke out in some countries. Many people left their homes because of war or persecution or fear thereof. The upheaval resulted in many people being without passports, or even nations to issue them, which prevented much international travel, often trapping refugees.

The precipitating event for the Nansen passport was the 1921 announcement by the new government of the Soviet Union revoking the citizenship of Russians living abroad, including some 800,000 refugees from the Russian Civil War. The first Nansen passports were issued following an international agreement reached at the Intergovernmental Conference on Identity Certificates for Russian Refugees, convened by Fridtjof Nansen in Geneva from July 3, 1922, to July 5, 1922, in his role as High Commissioner for Refugees for the League of Nations. By 1942, they were honoured by governments in 52 countries.

In 1924, the Nansen arrangement was broadened to also include Armenian, and in 1928 to Assyrian, Bulgarian, and Turkish refugees. Approximately 450,000 Nansen passports were provided to stateless people and refugees who needed travel documents, but could not obtain one from a national authority.

Following Nansen's death in 1930, the passport was handled by the Nansen International Office for Refugees within the League of Nations. At that point the passport no longer included a reference to the 1922 conference, but were issued in the name of the League. The office was closed in 1938; passports were thereafter issued by a new agency, the Office of the High Commissioner for Refugees under the Protection of the League of Nations in London.

== Gallery ==
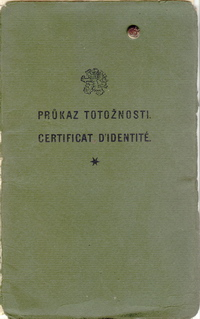
Nansen passport cover;
Police office, Prague, Czechoslovakia, 1930

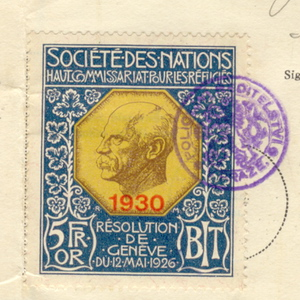
Nansen passport renewal stamp;
Nansen International Office for Refugees, 1930

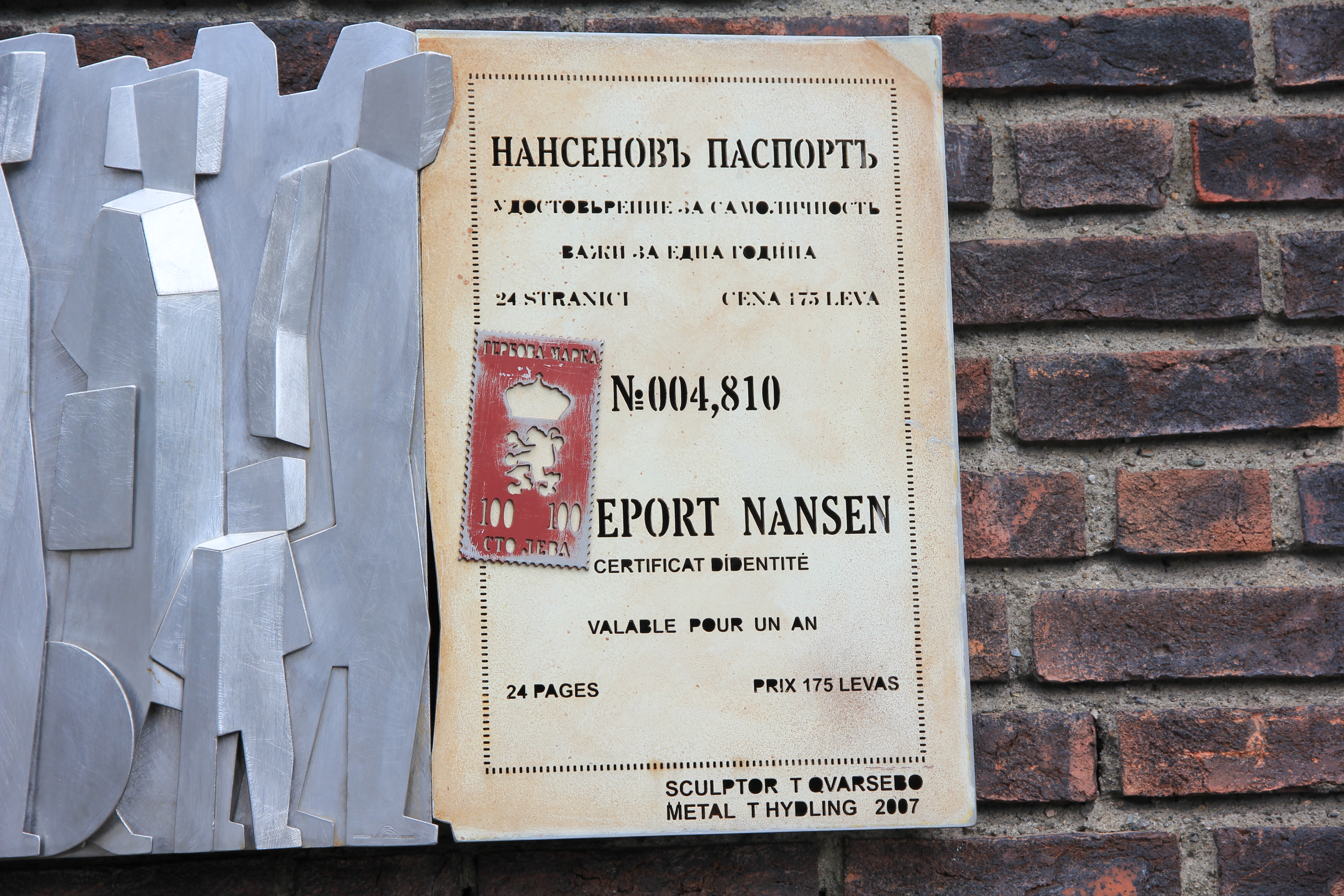
Memorial plaque (partial view);
outside wall, City Hall, Oslo, Norway, 2007

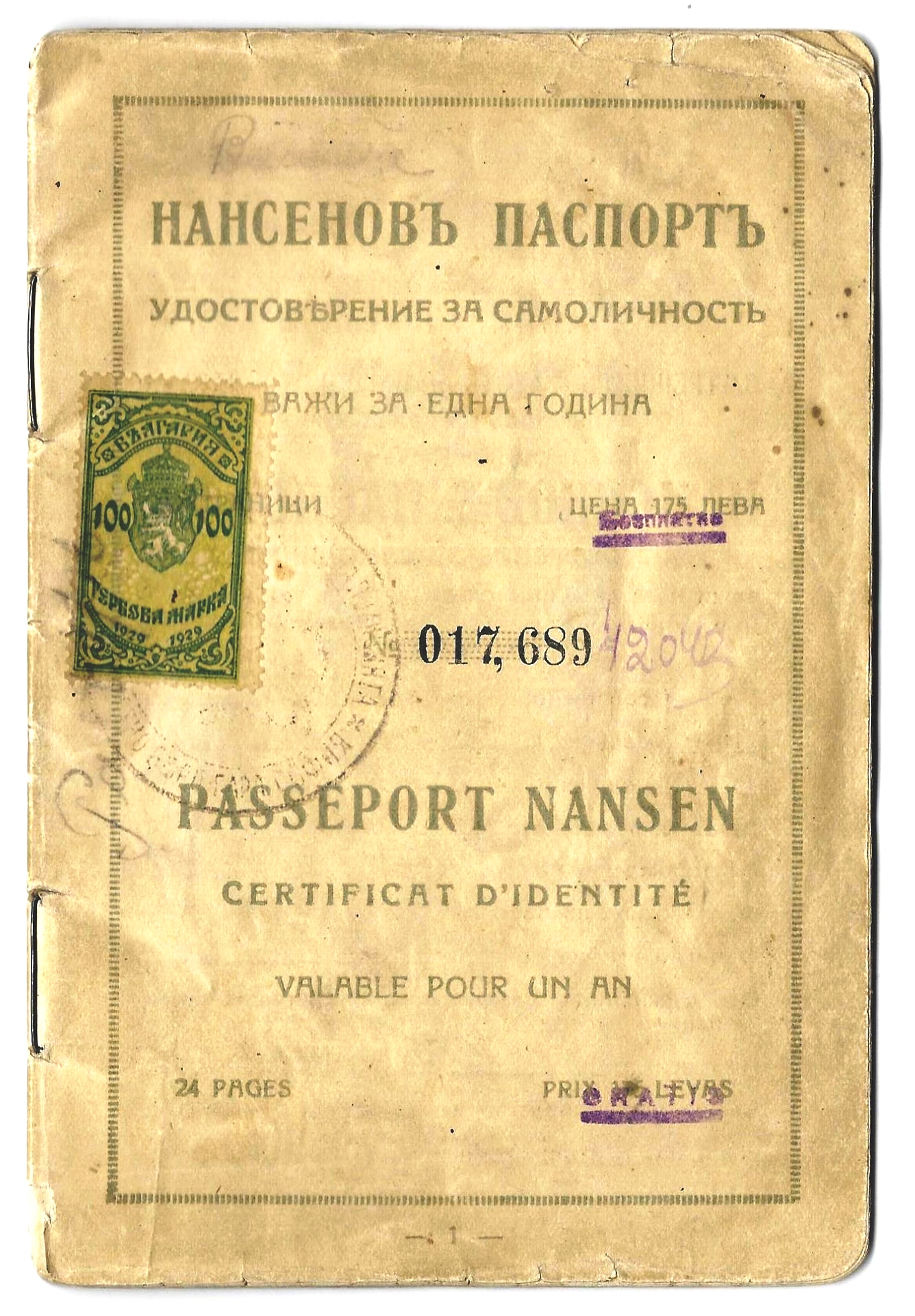
Bulgarian Nansen passport

== Legacy ==
The Nansen International Office for Refugees was awarded the 1938 Nobel Peace Prize for its efforts to establish the Nansen passports.

While Nansen passports are no longer issued, existing national and supranational authorities, including the United Nations, issue travel documents for stateless people and refugees, including certificates of identity (or "alien's passports") and refugee travel documents.

== Notable bearers ==
- Robert Capa
- Sergiu Celibidache
- Marc Chagall
- Françoise Frenkel
- Alexander Galich
- Zuzanna Ginczanka
- Alexander Grothendieck
- Anatol Heintz
- Ze'ev Jabotinsky
- Vladimir Nabokov
- Aristotle Onassis
- Krikor Pambuccian
- Anna Pavlova
- St. Grigol Peradze
- Jadwiga Piłsudska
- Sergey Rakhmaninov
- Dimitri Riabouchinsky
- Dries Riphagen
- Menachem Mendel Schneerson
- Otto Skorzeny
- I. S. K. Soboleff
- Victor Starffin
- Igor Stravinsky
- Grand Duchess Maria Pavlovna of Russia
- Princess Vera Constantinovna of Russia
