= Krikor Pambuccian =

Krikor (Grigore) Pambuccian (Armenian: Գրիգոր Բամպուքծեան; 23 August 1915 – 1996) was an Armenian–Romanian Professor of Pathology at the Carol Davila University of Medicine and Pharmacy and longtime Vice-President of the Armenian Apostolic Parish of Romania (1944-1993).

== Life and career ==
Krikor (Grigore) Pambuccian was born in Adana, a city in the eastern Ottoman Empire (present Turkey). During the Armenian genocide his family was forced to leave and ended up as stateless refugees, holders of the Nansen passport, going through Damascus, Cairo, Alexandria, Larnaca, to settle in Constanța. There he studied at the Deutsche Evangelische Volksschule and at the Mircea cel Bătrân High School, which he graduated as Valedictorian. He studied medicine at the Carol Davila University of Medicine and Pharmacy between 1936 and 1942, was a battalion physician during World War II, and then climbed the ladders of an academic career to become, in 1973, Professor of Pathology at the Carol Davila University of Medicine and Pharmacy.

Pambuccian's son Stefan (1957-2020) also became a pathologist.

As Vice-President of the Armenian Apostolic Parish of Romania, he aimed at preserving, to the best of his ability, the religious patrimony of the Armenian community in Romania during a difficult time for both the Armenian community and Romania.

== Works ==
In his thesis (Experimental chemical cancer) of 1942 he studied tar-induced cancer in rats. Later on, the range of research topics widened to include the pathology of the heart and the blood vessels, the tumors of the heart, the pathology of the digestive tract, of the liver and the pancreas, the pathology of the infant, pre-cancerous states and in situ cancer, the pathology of the mouth (in particular Lichen planus), accidental and professional exposure to toxins (in the late 1960s and early 1970s doing an in-depth study of the toxic (carcinogenic) nature of the environment of Copşa Mică), toxic reactions to phenylhydrazine, hypertoxic forms of viral disease, suppurating pulmonary infections, cerebrotendineous xanthomatosis, visceral lesions in rheumatic disorder and rheumatoid arthritis, trichinosis, the reactions of the gastric mucosa to aspirin, and to aspirin combined with prednisone, experimental research in syphilis and in trichinosis, sudden infant death syndrome, and on hypertrophic cardiomyopathy caused by hypersecretion of adrenocortical hormones. He pioneered the pathological study of the effects of dental implants on the oral cavity, in collaboration with Dr. Grigore Osipov-Sinești (1907-1989) and with Ernst Helmut Pruin (1913-2008) and Benedict Heinrich.

== Recognition ==
In 1978, he was awarded the Saint Nerses Shnorhali medal by Vazgen I, the Catholicos of the Armenian Apostolic Church.

== Publications ==
- (co-author) Morfopatologia aparatului cardiovascular (1959)
- (co-author) Diagnosticul precoce al tumorilor maligne (1964)
- (co-author)Trichineloza (1970)
- (co-author) Anatomia patologică (1980)
- Morfopatologie stomatologică (1987)
