= Antoine Abed =

Lebanese archbishop

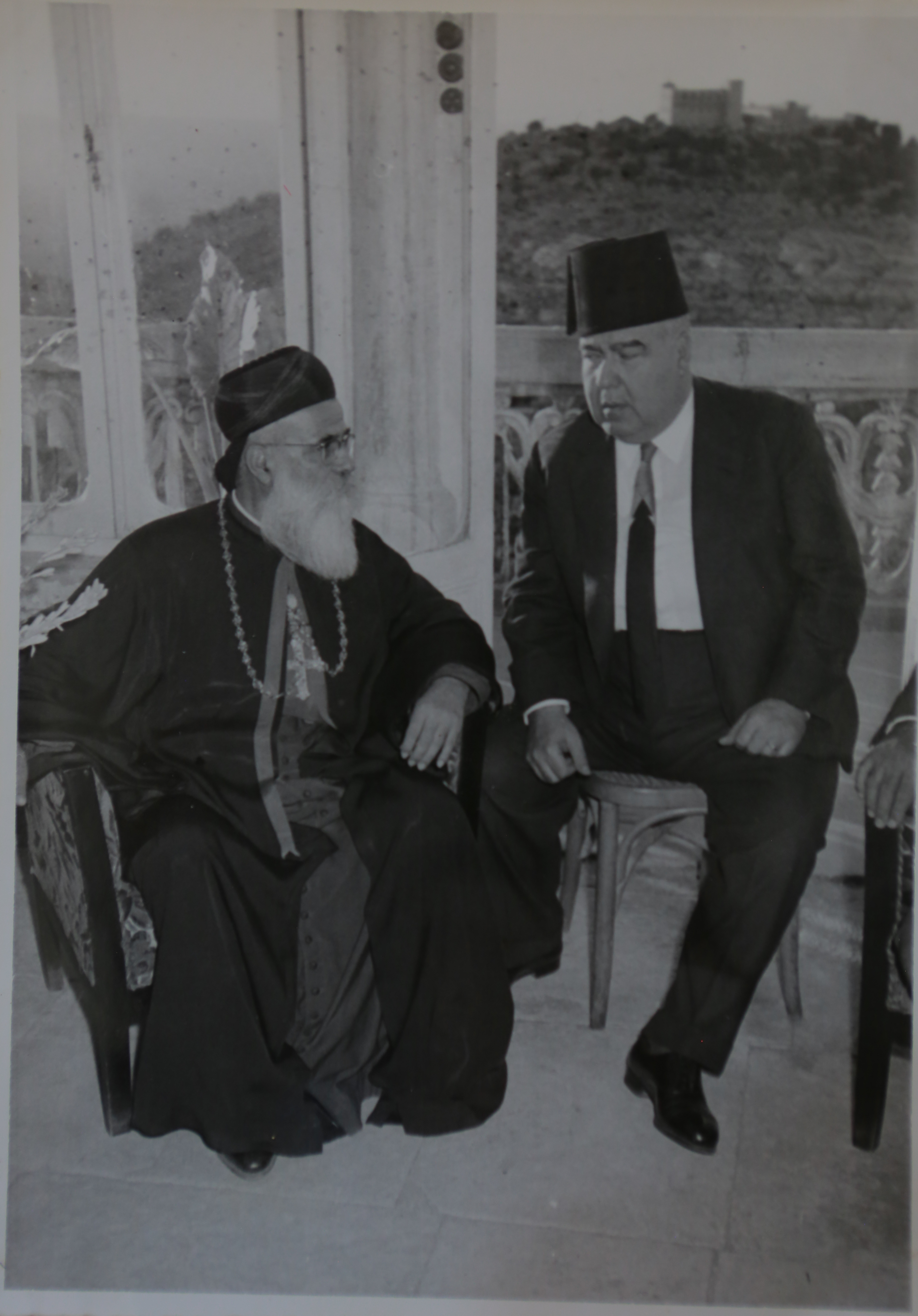
Antoine Abed with Boutros el-Khoury

Antoine Abed (26 October 1896 in Tripoli, Lebanon – 15 September 1975) was a Maronite Archeparch of the Maronite Catholic Archeparchy of Tripoli in Lebanon.

== Life ==
Abed was ordained priest on 17 May 1925 in Tripoli, Lebanon. His appointment as Archbishop of Tripoli, was on 23 April 1933, and Abed was ordained bishop by Maronite Patriarch of Antioch, Anthony Peter Arida, on 7 May 1933. His co-consecrators were Paul Aouad, Archeparch of Cyprus, Chuchrallah Khoury, Archeparch of Tyre, Abdallah Khoury, Titular bishop of Arca in Phoenicia dei Maroniti, Pierre Feghali, Titular bishop of Epiphania in Syria, Elie Rischa, Titular bishop of Nazareth per i Maroniti, Elie Chedid, Titular Archbishop of Chyrrus per i Maroniti, Emmanuel Phares, Titular bishop of Tarsus dei Maroniti and Paul Akl, Titular bishop of Laodicea in Syria per i Maroniti. He was confirmed by the Holy See on 16 October 1933, was named Archeparch of Tripoli on 5 September 1965, and until his death on 15 September 1975 he was by forty-two years in office Archeparch of Tripoli. Archbishop Abed was a Council Father of the Second Vatican Council and participated in all sessions.

== Awards ==
- 1959: Order of Merit of the Federal Republic of Germany
