= Alexandru Pesamosca =

Romanian surgeon (1930–2011)

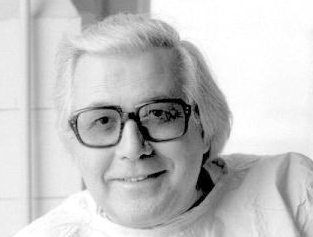
Alexandru Pesamosca

Alexandru Pesamosca (March 14, 1930 – September 1, 2011) was a Romanian surgeon and pediatrician, medic at the Marie Sklodovska-Curie (former Budimex) Hospital in Bucharest. He was the leading surgeon for over 50,000 medical surgeries on children at this hospital and other medical facilities in Romania and outside the country.

He was born in Constanța, the son of an officer in the Romanian Royal Navy. He studied at the Mircea cel Bătrân High School in his native city, graduating in 1948. He then went to Bucharest to study at the Faculty of Medicine, obtaining his MD degree in 1954. In 2000 he was awarded the National Order of Faithful Service, Commander rank.

Pesamosca was the patron of the Cuviosul Stelian și Sfântul Nicolae-Brâncoveanu Church built in the backyard of the hospital. In the summer of 2011 he was hospitalized at the Floreasca Hospital for cardiac and renal problems. He died there on 1 September 2011, aged 81 and was buried in the courtyard of the Marie Curie Hospital.
