= Françoise Frenkel =

Polish-Jewish writer and bookseller (1889–1975)

Françoise Frenkel (14 July 1889 – 18 January 1975) was a Polish-Jewish writer and bookseller. With her husband, in 1921 she opened the "Maison du Livre français", Berlin's first specialist French book store, which she ran till 1939.

On 27 August 1939 she belatedly escaped from Germany as a passenger on a special train to Paris which had been organised by the French embassy. Shortly before June 1940, which was when the invading German army reached Paris, she joined the thousands of Parisians fleeing to the south of the country. As the Nazi invaders tightened their grip on southern France she was forced to flee again, crossing into Switzerland near Annecy, on her third attempt, in June 1943. She was allowed to stay in Geneva, her cousin the cinema producer Lazar Wechsler vouching for her, and she survived.

She wrote an account of her adventures which was published (in French) in September 1945 by J.-H. Jeheber S.A, a Genevan publishing house that has long ago disappeared. Very few copies were produced and the book was quickly forgotten. However, 35 years after the author's death it was rediscovered in a car boot sale in southern France. "Rien où poser sa tête" ("No place to rest her head") was republished in 2015, also being translated into German for the first time. It now found a wider resonance, commended by the respected political journalist Robert Fisk both for its messages and for its "abrupt, shocking yet delicate prose, cruelty and beauty combined in just over 250 pages".

== Life ==
=== Family provenance and early years ===
Frymeta Idesa Frenkel, who later changed her first name to Françoise, was born into an intellectual Polish-Jewish family in Piotrków Trybunalski, a midsized prosperous industrial town in Congress Poland, at that time a western province of the Russian Empire. She had a musical education, and on completing her schooling, moved to Leipzig to study with composer Xaver Scharwenka, which also gave her an opportunity to improve her German. She then moved on to the Sorbonne in Paris where the focus of her study – later also her life's defining passion – was French literature. When not studying, she spent her time engrossed by the second hand book stalls along the quais by the river near Notre-Dame, and in the second hand-book shops in the city's left-bank quarter. In 1918, at the end of World War I, she returned home. Her family were well, but the house had been emptied by invading armies. The piano had disappeared from the living room, and in her childhood bedroom the wall hangings had been stripped, and the uncovered plaster being coated with newspaper. Worst of all, the little book collection that she had started to assemble as a child had been taken, although the now empty cabinet that had accommodated it, was still in her room.

=== The dedicated entrepreneuse ===
She returned to Paris to complete her studies, after which she took a traineeship in a second hand bookshop in the Rue Gay-Lussac. Her success there encouraged her to set up a bookshop specialising in French books back home in Poland, an independent Polish state was re-emerging for the first time since 1795. French culture and literature were respected and widely studied in Poland, especially in the south of the country, and she selected Kraków as an ideal location for a specialist French bookshop. Visiting the city to research the market forced a change of plan, however, when she discovered an abundance of well stocked bookshops, with an excellent selection of French literature. Travelling back to Paris, she interrupted her journey for an overnight stop at Berlin to visit a friend, she noticed a total absence of French books. Her friends did not share her conviction that here was a commercial opportunity, and the French Consul General also appeared determined to dampen her enthusiasm. Frenkel was not dissuaded, however. By this time she had married Simon Raichenstein, and the two began selling French books, working from the landing between floors in a private apartment in Kleist Street. In 1921, two years after Sylvia Beach had opened Shakespeare and Company, the first bookstore dedicated to English language literature in Paris and now receiving support from the French diplomatic mission in Berlin, Frenkel and Raichenstein opened the "Maison du Livre français" ( "House of the French Book") along the Passauer Street in a district of west-central Berlin with many Jewish residents.

At first, Berlin's intellectual elite approached this new supply of francophone literature only with caution, but at this time, in the wake of the Russian Revolution, there were also around 100,000 Russian refugees living in Berlin, many of whom were well educated and welcomed the chance to read French classics in the original language. As the 1920s progressed German customers increased. The enterprise acquired a certain cachet, becoming a cultural focus, described by one source as "one of the top addresses for all francophiles" in the city. Frenkel organised receptions for visiting French literary figures. Among visitors at the Passauer Street bookshop were: Claude Anet, Henri Barbusse, André Gide, Julien Benda, Aristide Briand and Colette .

=== Régime change ===
A new government at the start of 1933 changed the political context. The Nazis swiftly transformed Germany into a dictatorship with its antisemitic policy. During the next couple of years many of Germany's Jews fled abroad or were arrested.

Frenkel's husband Simon Raichenstein was also Jewish. He was born in Mogilev, Belarus and belonged to the community of Polish and Russian-Jewish exiles among whom memories of anti-Jewish pogroms were alive. He barely hesitated. By November 1933 he fled to Paris with a Nansen passport. The French authorities refused to issue him an identity card, but he was issued a residence permit. Raichenstein remained in France until July 1942 when he was arrested and, later, transported to Auschwitz. There he died on 19 August 1942.

Françoise Frenkel remained in Berlin. The shop was already facing an officially mandated boycott in 1933, but it remained open. After 1935 practical problems increased. There was intervention from the censors and there were other political pressures. Sources refer to an absence of practical backing from the French embassy. Run by a Polish Jewess, it was remarkable that the book store was able to operate at all right through till 1939. It is possible the business stayed open because its activities enjoyed the support of powerful French publishing houses and French politicians, not all of whom were at this stage committed enemies of Nazi Germany.

She was in Berlin in November 1938 to experience Kristallnacht when synagogues and the premises of Jewish businesses were attacked. She experienced the officially sanctioned pogrom from the streets but her book store was spared. As World War II loomed she accepted that there was no future left for her in Germany, and in August 1939 she escaped as a passenger on a special train to Paris organised by the French embassy. Her personal belongings were seized by the Nazis. In Berlin, the remaining stock of the "Maison du Livre français" was also seized.

=== France ===
Françoise Frenkel spent the next nine months in Paris where her husband already was but her own written record does not mention him. There was no news from her widowed mother in Poland. On 10 May 1940 German forces invaded France and on 22 June 1940 an armistice was agreed between the French and German governments.

Frenkel escaped to the south, but finding Vichy overcrowded she carried on to Clermont-Ferrand. She had reached the front-line. Frenkel's first weeks in Vichy France were in Avignon, then in Nice. An attempted marriage with a Frenchman for security failed.

Françoise Frenkel's memoire, 'Rien où poser ma tête', offers two things: an exciting journey of discovery of Berlin between the wars, including insights into largely unknown areas - commercial processes, court actions and the media of cultural exchange, and a report from a woman's perspective of flight and persecution in occupied France during the dark years. ... the re-emergence of Frenkel's book indicates that the years of Nazi occupation, although in the past, continue to resonate in the French present - and that we should probably expect more "literary discoveries" of this nature to emerge.

Françoise Frenkels Erinnerungen Rien où poser ma tête bieten zweierlei: eine aufregende Entdeckungsreise in das Berlin der Zwischenkriegszeit, mit Einblicken in bislang weitgehend unbekannte Räume, Agenten, Prozesse und Medien des Kulturtransfers, und: einen Bericht aus weiblicher Perspektive von Flucht und Verfolgung im besetzten Frankreich der années noires. ... die 'Wiederkehr' von Frenkels Buch, dass die Okkupationszeit nicht aufhört, in die französische Gegenwart hineinzuwirken – und dass es vermutlich noch viele 'Wiedergänger' dieser Art geben wird.

Margarete Zimmermann 2015

Frenkel having obtained a visa for Switzerland soon after her arrival in France in 1939, she delayed going there for a couple of years. In August 1942, she narrowly avoided capture and deportation, then the police carried out a raid on the little "Hotel Arche de Noe" ("Noah's Ark Hotel") where she was staying. All the hotel's other Jewish guests were escorted into police trucks. She went "underground" and was dependent for survival on "good" French people. Under Italian officials, Frenkel's presence was granted a level of legal status. Friends organised a Swiss visa for her and just a few days before its expiry she succeeded in entering Switzerland at the third attempt.

=== Later years ===
Françoise Frenkel was already 53 when she crossed the frontier near Annecy. She lived for more than another thirty years, dying at Nice on 18 January 1975. Very little is known about her final decades. She was again in Berlin in 1959 visiting the divided city to apply for compensation in respect of her lost goods while escaping in 1939. In 1960 the West German government paid her DM 3,500 as "reparation".
