= Pavel Chihaia =

Romanian writer (1922–2019)

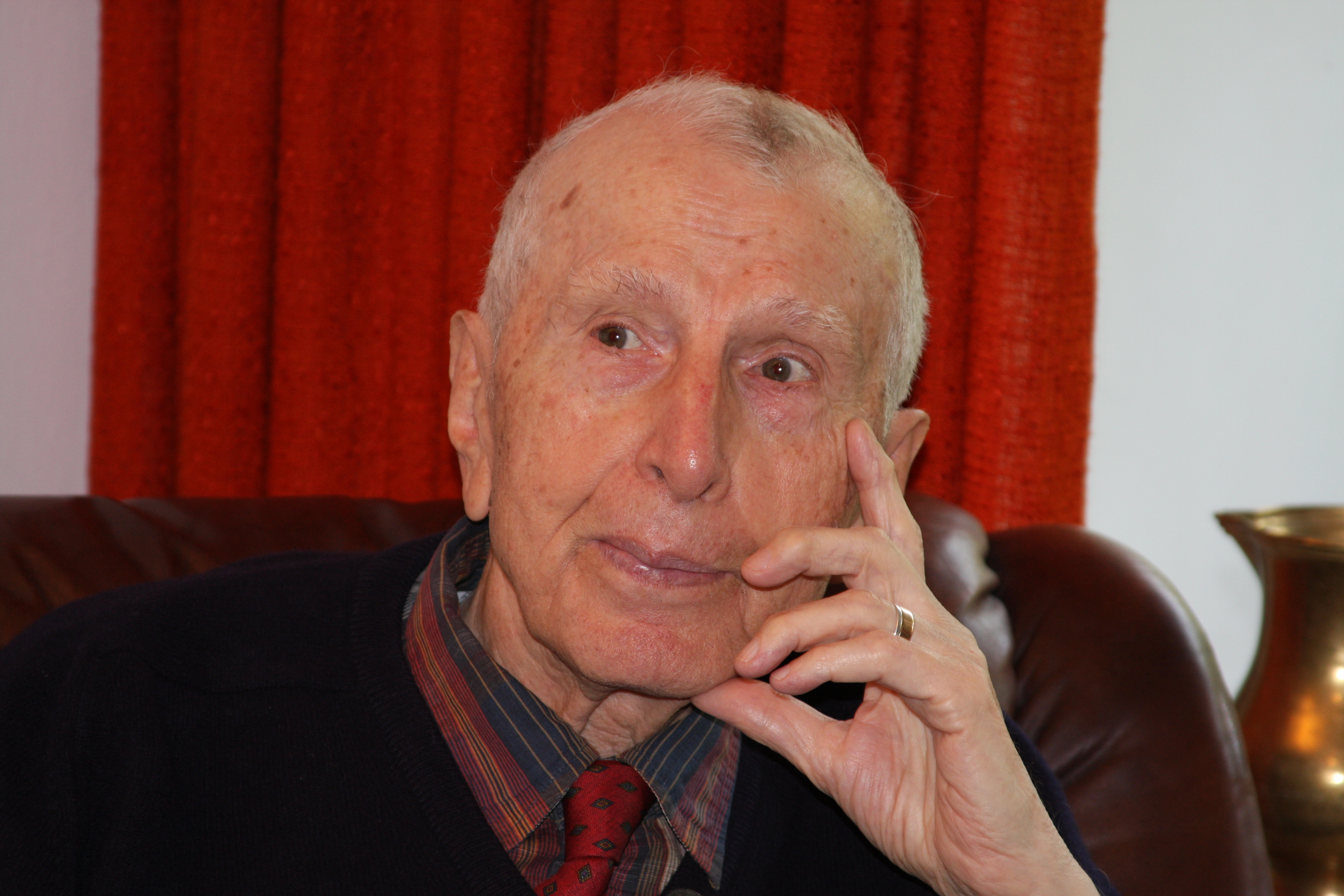
Pavel Chihaia in 2009

Pavel Chihaia (Romanian pronunciation: [ˈpavel ciˈhaja]; 23 April 1922 – 18 June 2019) was a Romanian novelist.

Born in Corabia, he graduated from the Mircea cel Bătrân High School in Constanța. Between 1941 and 1945 he attended the Faculty of Letters of the University of Bucharest, then worked as an employee at the General Directorate of Theaters until 1948. His first novel, Blocada ("The Blockade"), was published in 1947, shortly before the advent of his country's Communist regime. An opponent thereof, he managed to emigrate in 1978, ultimately settling in Munich, where he died in 2019.
