= George Forbes (cricketer) =

Scottish cricketer

Personal information
- Full name: George Thomson Forbes
- Born: 25 November 1906; Aberdeen, Aberdeenshire, Scotland
- Died: 3 November 1984 (aged 77); Aberdeen, Aberdeenshire, Scotland
- Batting: Right-handed
- Bowling: Right-arm fast-medium

Domestic team information
- Years: Team
- 1936–1938: Scotland

Career statistics
Competition	First-class
Matches	4
Runs scored	122
Batting average	15.25
100s/50s	–/–
Top score	29
Balls bowled	445
Wickets	11
Bowling average	15.72
5 wickets in innings	–
10 wickets in match	–
Best bowling	3/25
Catches/stumpings	3/–
- Source: Cricinfo, 6 July 2022

George Thomson Forbes (25 November 1906 – 3 November 1984) was a Scottish first-class cricketer.

Forbes was born at Aberdeen in November 1906. A club cricketer for Aberdeenshire Cricket Club, Forbes made his debut for Scotland in first-class cricket against Ireland at Edinburgh in 1936. He made two further first-class appearances in 1937, against Ireland at Belfast and the touring New Zealanders at Glasgow, with his final first-class appearance coming against Ireland at Glasgow in 1938. In his four matches, he scored 122 runs at an average of 15.25, with a highest score of 29. With his right-arm fast-medium bowling, he took 11 wickets at a bowling average of 15.72, with best figures of 3 for 25. A bank manager by profession, Forbes died at Aberdeen in November 1984.
