= I. S. K. Soboleff =

Russian adventurer and author (1892–1984)

I. S. K. Soboleff, also known as Ivan Sergeevich Kralichek-Sobolev (26 November 1892 – 2 November 1984), was a Russian White Army officer, adventurer, and writer. He is best known for undertaking a pioneering around-the-world journey by motorcycle in the late 1920s using a Nansen passport, an internationally recognized refugee travel document issued to stateless persons. Soboleff chronicled his experiences in the memoir Nansen Passport: Round the World on a Motor-Cycle (1936). A former Cossack cavalry lieutenant who fled Russia after the Bolshevik Revolution, Soboleff later settled in Great Britain, served as a Major in the British Army during World War II, and was awarded the Military Cross for his service.
