= Jean-Raymond Tournoux =

French journalist (1914–1984)

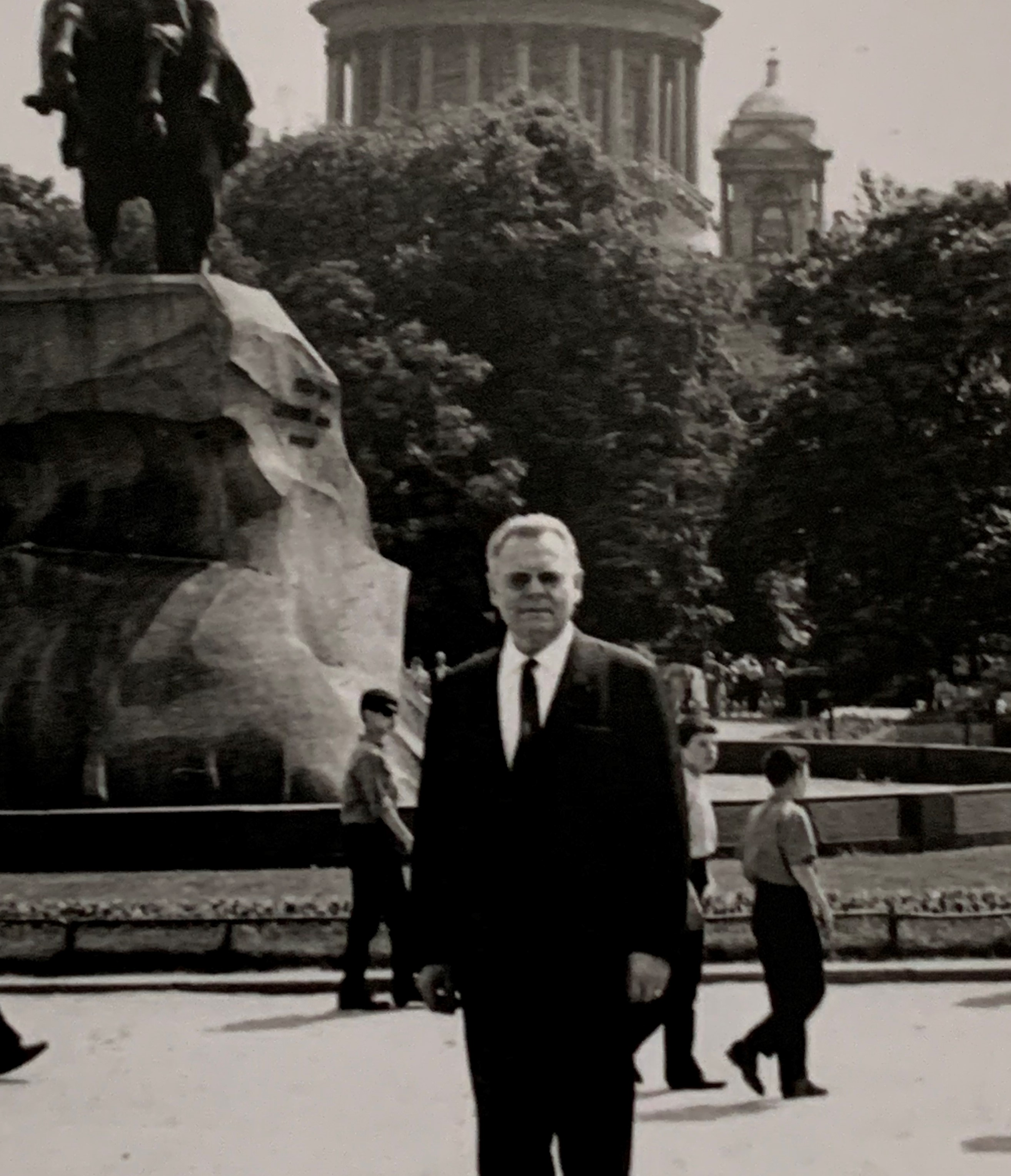
- Born: August 15, 1914; Les Rousses
- Died: November 23, 1984 (aged 70); Paris
- Occupations: Parliamentary journalist; writer; historian
- Writing career
- Notable awards: Croix de Guerre; Legion of Honour; Order of the Black Star

Jean-Raymond Tournoux (15 August 1914 – 23 November 1984) was a French parliamentary journalist, writer and historian. Fascinated by Pétain and de Gaulle, Tournoux devoted most of his work to them. He became known as "the historian of secrecy" for his meticulous documentation, his storing of small snippets of conversation, and his revealing of "great secrets of contemporary history".

== Biography ==
Son of commander Léon Tournoux and Aline Gauthier, Jean-Raymond Tournoux was born in Les Rousses. After completing his secondary studies at the high school of Belfort, Tournoux studied journalism. He began his career as an editorial secretary at the République de l'Est (1934–1939) and then worked as a radio editor at the Radiodiffusion Française from 1941 to 1946 while collaborating with various daily and weekly newspapers such as L'Eclair comtois, L'Epoque, Marianne and L'Actualité économique et financière. Head of department at Libération and then at Ce Matin until 1950, he then worked as an editorialist at l'Information (1950–1955), Combat, Progrès de Lyon (1945–1962) and Figaro (1976–1980) and became political director of Paris-Match from 1964 to 1976. During his tenure as director of the contemporary history collection at the Plon bookstore, he wrote several works on the politics of the Fourth and Fifth Republics and also published historical columns in the newspaper Le Monde and La Revue des Deux Mondes.

During the Second World War, following his demobilization, he joined the Zone libre and became a press correspondent for the Vichy government. As a journalist for the Vichy radio station and for La Légion, Marshal Pétain awarded him the Order of the Francisque. His proximity to the Marshal, whom he accompanied on his travels, interested intelligence services. In May 1949, he was awarded the Croix de Guerre for his work in an underground intelligence network in Andalucia.

In 1981, he became a member of the Institut de France, by being admitted to the Academy of Moral and Political Sciences.

Tournoux married Francine Lambert in 1939. Together, they had six children: Noëlle (born 1941), Roland (born 1942), Mireille (born 1945), Renaud (born 1946), Frédéric (born 1951), and Aude (born 1956). Four years after the death of his wife in 1971, he married Jacqueline Heiny. He died on November 23, 1984, in Paris.

== Awards and distinctions ==
His work has been rewarded with numerous distinctions:

- Croix de Guerre (1949)
- Prix du Nouveau Cercle for Pétain et de Gaulle
- Grand prix du Festival international du Livre (1969)
- Historia Prize (1980)
- Legion of Honour
- Order of the National Economy
- Order of the Black Star

== Bibliography ==
- Carnets secrets de la politique, Plon, 1958
- Secrets d'État, Plon, 1960
- L'Histoire secrète. La Cagoule, le Front populaire, Vichy, Londres, Plon, 1962
- Pétain et de Gaulle, Plon, 1964
- La Tragédie du général, Plon, 1967
- Le Mois de mai du général. Le livre blanc des évènements, Plon, 1969
- Le Tourment et la fatalité. Tout finit par se savoir, Plon, 1974
- Journal secret. Une année pas comme les autres, Plon, 1975
- Le Feu et la cendre. Les années politiques du général de Gaulle, Plon, 1979
- Pétain et la France, Plon, 1980
- Le Royaume d'Otto, Flammarion, 1982
- France, ton café fout le camp. L'engrenage de la démocratie populaire, Flammarion, 1982
