= Clayton W. Mapoles =

American politician

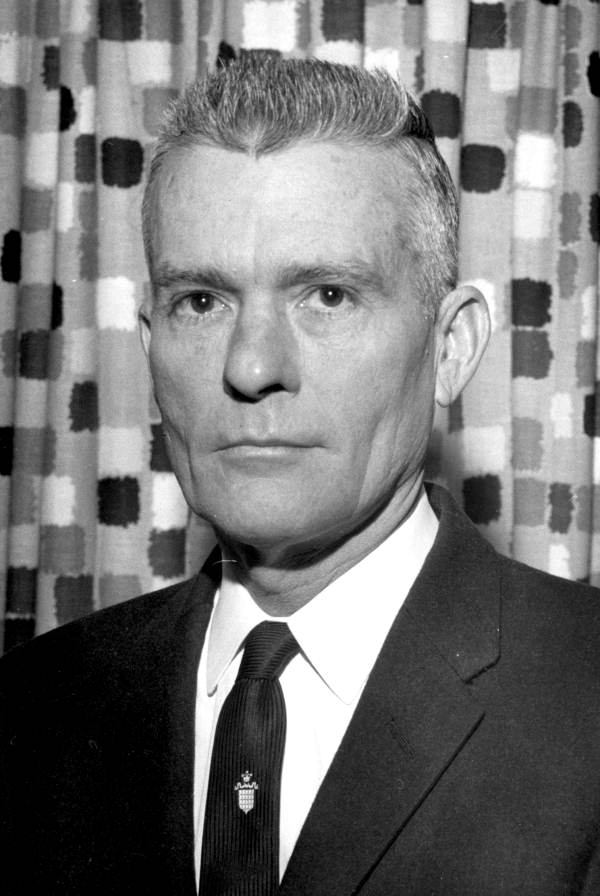
- Mapoles in 1961

Member of the Florida Senate from the 1st district
- In office 1961–1965

Personal details
- Born: May 23, 1914 Laurel Hill, Florida, U.S.
- Died: November 3, 1984 (aged 70)
- Party: Democratic

Clayton W. Mapoles (May 23, 1914 – November 3, 1984) was an American politician. He served as a Democratic member for the 1st district of the Florida Senate.

== Life and career ==
Mapoles was born in Laurel Hill, Florida. He was a newspaper publisher.

Mapoles served in the Florida Senate from 1961 to 1965, representing the 1st district.

Mapoles died on November 3, 1984, at the age of 70.
