= Peter de Polnay =

English novelist and non-fiction writer (1906–1984)

- Born: 8 March 1906; Budapest, Hungary
- Died: 21 November 1984 (aged 78); Paris, France
- Occupation: Writer
- Spouse(s): Margaret Mitchell Banks, Elaine Daphne Tasker, Maria del Carmen Rubio y Caparo
- Children: Gregory de Polnay

Peter de Polnay (Hungarian: Polnay Péter; 8 March 1906 – 21 November 1984) was a Hungarian-born English novelist and non-fiction writer who wrote over 80 books.

== Personal life ==
Peter de Polnay was born to Jenő Polnay (born Pollacsek) and Marguerite de Tiszasuly on 8 March 1906. His father was director of the Atlantica Shipping Company and the family name was nobilified to de Polnay in recognition of his service to the Hapsburg monarchy. His father later served briefly as Minister of Food Distribution in the Friedrich government in August 1919, then traveled to the United States in 1921 as a trade emissary of the Horthy regime. His father served as the president of the National Association of Hungarian Jews and during World War Two, ran the Budapest Kindergarten Association, an orphanage, and was responsible for saving the lives of nearly 400 children from the Gestapo in 1944.

Peter de Polnay and his siblings were largely raised and educated by various governesses and spent time in Switzerland and Italy. He became fluent in five languages: English, French, German, Italian, and Spanish. He never acknowledged being able to speak Hungarian. He converted to Catholicism as a young man and never acknowledged his Jewish origin. This was one of a number of facts he omitted or changed in his autobiography My Road (1978). He also claimed to have spent four years in Devonshire as a child and omitted mention of a second sister, Emily, as well as of his son Gregory.

In January 1926, he was arrested for his involvement in a conspiracy organized by Prince Ludwig Windisch-Graetz to forge 30 million in French franc notes. He was released after a few days without explanation. In 1927, he sailed from Bremen to Buenos Aires aboard the German liner Madrid. He joined his younger brother Ivan in Argentina and the two travelled and took a variety of jobs, usually ill-paid and short-lived, an experience he later wrote about in Fools of Choice (1955). He returned to Hungary in 1930 to collect an inheritance of 160,000 Hungarian pengő. He then travelled to England, bought a red Bentley, drove to the French Riviera, and quickly lost his fortune gambling at the Monte Carlo Casino as he later described in A Door Ajar (1959). He then sailed to Kenya, where he tried and failed at running a chicken farm. While in Kenya, he began what would become his first novel Angry Man's Tale, drawing on his experiences on the Riviera. He left Kenya in 1934, spent the winter on Mallorca, then traveled to Paris, where he finished the book. While living in Paris, he became acquainted with the painter Maurice Utrillo, whose biography he would later write, as well as the novelist Marcel Aymé. Angry Man's Tale was published in both England and the United States in the fall of 1938. His U.S. publisher, Alfred A. Knopf, took out an ad in Saturday Review in which he proclaimed that "I like this book uncommonly well and want you to share my discovery of this new talent."

De Polnay was in Paris when the German Army occupied the city in June 1940. He spent the next four months before arranging to travel to Vichy France, from which he hoped to escape to England. He was arrested in Marseille on suspicion of passing funds to supporters of the Free France. He was released for lack of evidence and was able to make his way over the Pyrenees to Spain. He was then able to reach Gibraltar and sail for England, arriving in August 1941.In England, he enlisted in the British Army and was put into the Royal Pioneer Corps. He wrote the account of his experiences under German occupation and his escape, which was published in 1942 as Death and Tomorrow. The book was a best-seller in both England and the U.S.. L. P. Hartley wrote of it, "The story of the fall of France has been told many times, though never more vividly than it is here."

Shortly before the book was published, he married Margaret Mitchell Banks, the daughter of a former King's Counsel Sir Reginald Mitchell Banks and former wife of the photographer Norman Parkinson. Their son Gregory was born in 1943. After the war, de Polnay and his wife rented Boulge Hall, formerly the home of the poet and translator Edward FitzGerald. He told his friend Cyril Connolly that his dream was "to live in Suffolk and shoot." Although the house proved unaffordable after two years, de Polnay later wrote his first biography, Into an Old Room, about the poet and the manor house. They then left Gregory, who spent most of his childhood in boarding schools, in the care of another family and traveled to Cyprus. Margaret de Polnay designed the covers for most of her husband's books published immediately after the war. She died in 1950.

De Polnay then spent several years traveling in Portugal and Spain, where he became friends with the novelist John Lodwick. He married Elaine Daphne Tasker in 1952 but the marriage ended in divorce less than two years later. In 1955 he married Maria del Carmen Rubio y Caparo, daughter of a Spanish theater director and the Spanish-Catalan actress Angela Rubio y Caparo. In 1957, the couple moved to England, where they lived for the next eight years in Hastings and St Leonards-on-Sea. De Polnay later wrote that he chose these towns for their proximity to London and "to keep me writing, for without writing the days would have been too long." During this period, they traveled each year to France, remaining longer and longer, often house-sitting for Nancy Mitford in Versailles during her own holidays. Finally, in 1965, they moved permanently to France. They took an apartment in a hotel on the Boulevard Saint-Germain that would be their primary residence until de Polnay's death. De Polnay became increasingly devout in his last two decades and Catholic themes of guilt and confession play a larger role in his later novels.

De Polnay died on 21 November 1984 in Paris.

== Writing career ==
Although de Polnay began his first novel on a bet, writing soon became his profession and main source of income. He wrote at a feverish pace, completing forty novels in just forty-five years. After the war, he settled into a fairly predictable pattern of finishing one book in time for the summer holidays and another just ahead of the Christmas season.

His first dozen novels were consistently reviewed, and generally favorably, in major magazines. Of his 1947 novel The Umbrella Thorns, which drew upon his experiences in Kenya, Hamilton Basso wrote in The New Yorker, "Mr. de Polnay's characters are grown-up men and women who have gone through a good deal of battering in the process of living their lives, but they refuse to take refuge in those adolescent inclinations, sentiments, and emotions which make so many 'serious' novels read as if they had been written by melancholy sophomores."

On the other hand, de Polnay was often criticized for writing in haste. Isabel Quigly wrote that his 1973 memoir The Moon and the Marabou Stork "gives the impression of having been written on the backs of old envelopes and posted off without correction or arrangement." In the same year, Christopher Wordsworth wrote of The Price You Pay that "Mr. de Polnay's stringent control of the tricks of his trade can't disguise the flimsyness of this novel."

He retained, however, a cadre of supporters. Anthony Burgess once wrote that "Because Mr. de Polnay is prolific, some people will not take him seriously. This is a dangerous mistake." Norman Shrapnel, who reviewed over a dozen of de Polnay's books, wrote that "Reading Peter de Polnay must for many have become a kind of habit – a good one, I'd say, since he makes professionalism in fiction a decent word.... His work is so unobtrusively crafted that it is easy to miss the extraordinary nature of a routine de Polnay achievement."

Orville Prescott may have made the most balanced assessment of de Polnay's work in his review of the 1948 novel The Moot Point:

Quite persuasive in his understanding of human psychology and briskly sure of himself in his story-telling, Mr. de Polnay can be counted upon to produce superior fiction. But there is a cold-blooded quality to his work, an ironic detachment, which makes his novels intellectually interesting without being emotionally moving. Even when Mr. de Polnay is being generously sympathetic to weak and erring mortals one feels that it is an effort, that an aloof and knowing smile would be more natural to him.... Mr. de Polnay understands all and forgives all with a magnanimous tolerance which comes perilously close to condescension.

De Polnay wrote under at least two pseudonyms. Between 1961 and 1966, W. H. Allen & Co. published three novels using the pseudonym Rodney Garland, which had been used by the Hungarian emigre writer Adam Martin de Hegedus for two novels with homosexual subject matter: The Heart in Exile (1953) and The Troubled Midnight (1956). After de Hegedus's death in October 1955, de Polnay wrote World Without Dreams (1961), Hell and High Water (1963), and Sorcerer's Broth (1966). W. H. Allen also published six novels that de Polnay wrote using the pseudonym Jessamy Morrison: The No-Road (1963); The Wind Has Two Edges (1964); The Girl from Paris (1965); Rusty (1966); The Office Party (1967); and The Widow (1972). Most of the Morrison novels dealt with lesbian and homosexual themes and de Polnay may have used the pseudonym to avoid problems with the Catholic Church.

== Works ==
Novels

- Angry Man’s Tale, Secker & Warburg (1938); Knopf (1939); revised edition, Hutchinson (1947)
- Children, My Children!, Secker & Warburg (1939)
- Boo, Seeker & Warburg (1941); also published as The Magnificent Idiot, Doubleday (1942)
- Water on the Steps, Seeker & Warburg (1943)
- Two Mirrors, Constable (1944); Creative Age Press (1946)
- A Letter to an Undertaker, Home & Van Thal (1946)
- The Umbrella Thorn, Hutchinson (1946); Creative Age Press (1947)
- A Pin’s Fee, Hutchinson (1947)
- The Fat of the Land, Hutchinson (1948)
- The Moot Point, Creative Age Press (1948)
- Out of the Square, Creative Age Press (1949)
- Somebody Must, Hutchinson (1949)
- The Next Two Years, Hamish Hamilton (1951)
- A Beast in View, W. H. Allen (1953)
- When Time Is Dead, W. H. Allen (1954)
- Before I Sleep, W. H. Allen (1955)
- The Shorn Shadow, W. H. Allen (1956)
- The Clap of Silent Thunder, W. H. Allen (1957)
- Random House, W. H. Allen (1958)
- The Night of the Hyrax, W. H. Allen (1958)
- The Scales of Love, W. H. Allen (1958)
- The Shriek of the Gull, W. H. Allen (1959)
- The Uninvolved, W. H. Allen (1959)
- The Gamesters, W. H. Allen (1960); Frank R. Walker (1962)
- Mario, W. H. Allen (1961)
- No Empty Hands, W. H. Allen (1961); Bobbs-Merrill (1961)
- A Man of Fortune, W. H. Allen (1963)
- The Run of Night, W. H. Allen (1963)
- Three Phases of High Summer, W. H. Allen (1963)
- A Home of One's Own, W. H. Allen (1964)
- The Plaster Bed, W. H. Allen (1964)
- As the Crow Flies, W. H. Allen (1965)
- In Raymond's Wake, W. H. Allen (1965)
- The Centre-Piece, W. H. Allen (1966)
- Not the Defeated, W. H. Allen (1966)
- Winter's Promise, W. H. Allen (1967)
- The Second Death of a Hero, W. H. Allen (1968)
- The Patriots, W. H. Allen (1969)
- A Tower of Strength, W. H. Allen (1969)
- The Permanent Farewell, W. H. Allen (1970)
- Spring Snow and Algy, W. H. Allen (1970); St. Martin’s Press (1975)
- A Tale of Two Husbands, W. H. Allen (1970)
- A Life of Ease, W. H. Allen (1971)
- The Grey Sheep, W. H. Allen (1972)
- The Loser, W. H. Allen (1973)
- The Price You Pay, W. H. Allen (1973)
- The Crow and the Cat, W. H. Allen (1974)
- Indifference, W. H. Allen (1974)
- The Scrap Heap, W. H. Allen (1974)
- A Clump of Trees, W. H. Allen (1975)
- The Chains of Pity, W. H. Allen (1975)
- Blood and Water, W. H. Allen (1975)
- The Stuffed Dog, W. H. Allen (1976)
- None Shall Know, W. H. Allen (1976)
- Driftsand, W. H. Allen (1977)
- The Other Shore of Time, W. H. Allen (1978)
- It's Cold Next Door, W. H. Allen (1978)
- The Autumn Leaves Merchant, W. H. Allen (1979)
- The Talking Horse, W. H. Allen (1980)
- Make-Believe, W. H. Allen (1980)
- A Stone Throw, Piatkus Books (1981)
- A Minor Giant, Piatkus Books (1981)
- Sea Mist, W. H. Allen (1982)
- Of Venison and Victims, W. H. Allen (1983)
- The Other Self, W. H. Allen (1983)
- The Lost Stronghold, W. H. Allen (1984)
- The Guest House, W. H. Allen (1985)
- The Dog Days, W. H. Allen (1986)

Autobiography

- Death and To-morrow, Secker & Warburg (1942); also published as The Germans Came to Paris, Duell, Sloan & Pearce (1943)
- Fools of Choice, Robert Hale (1955)
- A Door Ajar, Robert Hale (1959)
- The Crack of Dawn: A Childhood Fantasy, Hollis & Carter (1960)
- The Moon and the Marabou Stork, Elek (1973)
- My Road: An Autobiography, W. H. Allen (1978)

Biography/History

- Into an Old Room: A Memoir of Edward FitzGerald, Creative Age Press (1949); also published in UK as Into an Old Room: The Paradox of E. FitzGerald, Secker & Warburg (1950)
- Death of a Legend: The True Story of Bonny Prince Charlie, Hamish Hamilton (1952)
- Garibaldi: The Legend and the Man, Hollis & Carter (1960); also published as Garibaldi: The Man and the Legend, Thomas Nelson (1961)
- A Queen of Spain: Isabel II, Hollis & Carter (1962)
- The World of Maurice Utrillo, Heinemann (1967); revised edition published as Enfant Terrible: The Life and World of Maurice Utrillo, Morrow (1969)
- Madame de Maintenon, Heron Books (1969)
- Napoleon's Police, W. H. Allen (1970)
- Sarah Bernhardt, Heron Books (1970)

Travel

- An Unfinished Journey to South-Western France and Auvergne, Wingate (1952)
- Descent from Burgos, R. Hale (1956)
- Peninsular Paradox: Spain, A Survey, McGibbon & Kee (1958)
- Travelling Light: A Guide to Foreign Parts, Hollis & Carter (1959)
- Aspects of Paris, W. H. Allen (1968), also published as Paris: An Urbane Guide to the City and Its People, Regnery (1970)

Translations

- (with Elspeth Grant) Odette Joyeux, Open Arms, Wingate (1954)
- Maurice David-Darnac, The True Story of the Maid of Orleans, W. H. Allen (1969)
- Pierre Kast, The Vampires of Alfama, W. H. Allen (1976)
