= Nelly Walter =

Nelly Walter (January 13, 1901 - October 25, 2001) was an American talent manager. From 1963-1998 she was the vice president of Columbia Artists Management Inc. She helped shape the careers of numerous famous musicians, including Leonard Bernstein, Montserrat Caballé, José Carreras, Plácido Domingo, Leontyne Price, Cesare Siepi, and Renata Tebaldi and Aprile Millo.
