= Adam Antes =

German sculptor

- Born: 11 August 1891; Worms, Germany
- Died: 28 November 1984 (aged 93); Worms, Germany
- Occupations: Sculptor and graphic artist

Adam Antes (11 August 1891 – 28 November 1984) was a German sculptor and graphic artist. He studied at the Technical University of Darmstadt. His work was part of the sculpture event in the art competition at the 1932 Summer Olympics.
