= Karmsaddeh =

Village in Zgharta District, Lebanon

Karmsaddeh كرمسدة
- Village
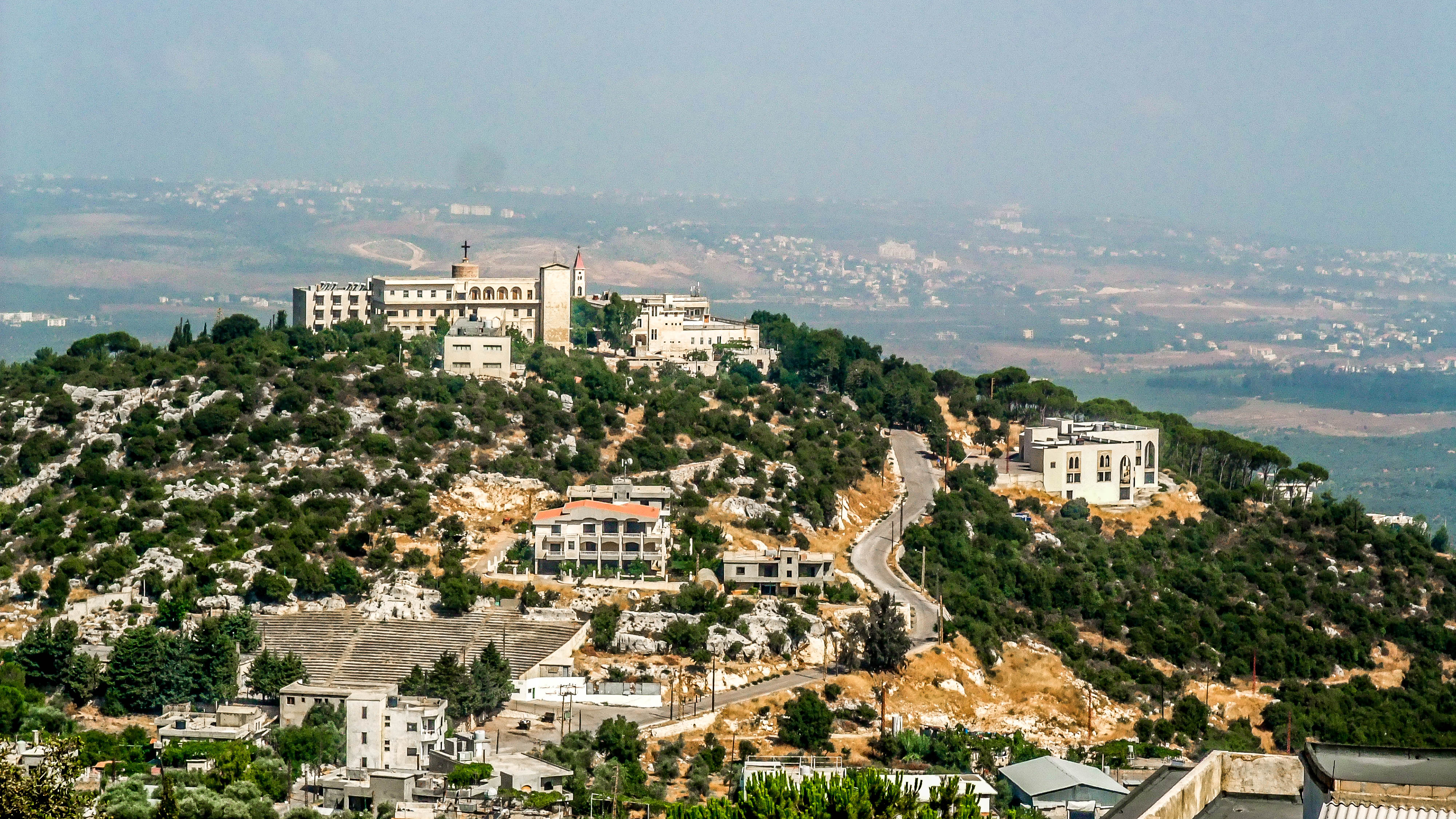
- Karmsaadeh

- Location within Lebanon
- Coordinates: 34°18′21″N 35°53′23″E
- Country: Lebanon
- Governorate: North Governorate
- District: Zgharta District
- Elevation: 637 m (2,090 ft)

Population
  - Total: 1,538
- Time zone: UTC+2 (EET)
  - Summer (DST): UTC+3 (EEST)
- Dialing code: +961

Karmsaddeh (also Karm Saddeh, Levantine Arabic: كرمسدة, romanized: Karmsaddeh) is a village located in the Zgharta District in the North Governorate of Lebanon. Its population is predominantly Maronite Catholic. Within the village center is Saint John's Church. Saint John is the patron Saint of Karmsaddeh.

== Etymology ==
Karmsaddeh is composed of two parts: Karm and Saddeh.

- Karm is of Semitic origin and means Vineyard.
- Saddeh could mean in Aramaic the Aromatic plants and also a measurement unit of 100 feet.

== History ==
Karmsaddeh have been home for a very ancient settlement as one can still find ruins going most probably to the Greek and Roman (and maybe Phoenician) periods in the vicinity of the village, especially in the area of the extinct village of Qarheen (Arabic: قرحين). According to some Historians, Qarheen was destroyed by the Mamluks at the end of the 13th century, and its inhabitants took refuge in Karmsaddeh.

It is arguably known that Karmsaddeh has been inhabited for up to 2,000 years.

The oldest reference to Qarheen is found on

a cooking-pot and its lid left to the Monastery of Qozhaya by Father George (Jerjes), a priest serving the village of Qarhin, in the year 1000 of the Christian era.

At the beginning of the Ottoman era in Lebanon, Karmsaddeh was a relatively important village.

In the first Ottoman Census of 1519, Karmsaddeh belonged to the Jebbet Bsharri region. All the inhabitants were Christians. The records show that there were 32 male adults (more than 15 years old), and 29 of them were married. If we adopt the common estimation of the Historians of that period, Karmsaddeh should have counted 211 inhabitants, which represented a relatively important settlement.

In the Census of 1571, Karmsaddeh counted 47 male adults, all Christians and married. It represents an annual demographic increase of 7.5 per mil per year, figure to be compared to the average of the region of 4.2 per mil per year. It is an important demographic vitality during the very difficult 16th century.

In 1885, the Maronite seminar of Mar Yaaqoub was founded in Karmsaddeh by the archbishop of Tripoli. It is still today one of the important seminars of the Maronite Church.

At the end of the 19th century, emigration to the new world started among the natives of Karmsaddeh. It continued all along the 20th century and many people left to Africa (South Africa and Senegal), to France, Canada, the United States and Australia. The largest community of Karmsaddeh natives is found in the region of Sydney. It is estimated some 500 towns-people live in Australia. There is a 'Karm Sadde Charitable' Association based in Sydney. The Association is based in Chester Hill, in the City of Parramatta. The community is fairly active and holds several charitable events each year.

== Demographics ==
The estimated population of Karmsaddeh is approximately 1,300 residents. It is estimated that there could be up to, or over 1,000 Karmsaddeh natives outside of Lebanon. The largest concentration is in Sydney, Australia.

Karmsaddeh is a predominantly Maronite Catholic village. Saint Jacob's Church is one of the main village churches. There are currently seventeen churches within the main village center, being dedicated to Saint John, the town's patron saint. One church is the older and smaller church, commonly used for weekday services, and the new church is used for Sundays and festivals as it has a larger capacity to hold the village population.

== Geography and Location ==
Karmsaddeh is located along the main highway route connecting the main towns of Zgharta and Ehden. The village is located on a mountain side. While the built up parts of the village are relatively small, the overall area of Karmsaddeh is large and covers a fair expanse of land area. The village is approximately 22 km/13 mi south-east of Tripoli.

The village is located approximately 750m above sea level which gives the village an all year round desirable climate, being midway between the coast and the mountains.

In summer, the heat is mild, with mountain and sea breezes help reduce the coastal humidity experienced along the coast, while the village remains warmer than upper mountain villages in North Lebanon. In winter, the villages experiences some snow, however the village remains habitable.

The village forms part of the end of the Quadisha Valley before the river feeds into the Mediterranean Sea.

== Facilities and amenity ==
Karmsaddeh itself is a relatively well serviced village. Water supplies are available to all homes in the main village area. Electricity is provided to most households, however services are inconsistent as they are in most parts of Lebanon.

Internet access is available to most of the village.

Within the village are a number of small family-owned supermarkets that provide everyday items such as groceries. There are a number of café/eatery facilities located in the village. Generally, most other supplies must are available in Zgharta, which lies approximately 15 minutes from the village by road.

Government services are also provided in Zgharta.

Within the village is also; an Orthodox Monastery (Known as Hamatoura); Saint Jacob's Church and school and seminary; Saint John's Church; a village hall and burial ground.

Karmsaddeh has a high residential population that has remained in the core of the village, unlike many other villages. This is due to a number of factors including the proximity of the village to major towns and cities, the year round habitable climate and the relative stability of the community. In recent years, many non-residents, notable residents and expatriates have invested in building homes in Karmsadde.

== Education ==
There are two schools within the village, an Archdiocese School and a village school. Saint Jacob's School and Seminary are renowned throughout north Lebanon.
