= Art and Remembrance: The Legacy of Felix Nussbaum =

- Directed by: Barbara Pfeffer
- Written by: Barbara Pfeffer
- Produced by: Barbara Pfeffer
- Release date: 1993
- Running time: 30 Mins
- Country: United States
- Language: English

Art and Remembrance: The Legacy of Felix Nussbaum is a 1993 documentary directed by Barbara Pfeffer, which explores the life of Jewish artist, Felix Nussbaum.

== Synopsis ==
Nussbaum is similar to many prominent artists throughout the ages, in that he gained fame for his pieces only after his death. However, his story is different from most in that the cause of his death was the subject of his work. A victim of the Auschwitz gas chambers, Nussbaum left behind paintings that give unique insight into the plight of European Jews who lived and died under the Nazi regime.

“The suffering of the people you can’t read in books. You can’t imagine by knowledge. You have to see it,” says Peter Junk, a librarian in Nussbaum’s hometown of Osnabrück, Germany. “But here in Osnabrück there are no people any longer who can tell what the paintings can.” Nussbaum’s paintings depict the terrifying social and psychological ramifications of Nazi genocide. Simple in form, but emotionally powerful, they serve as a reflection of both the artist and the turbulent times in which he lived.

These works often include representations of Nussbaum himself and help frame the story of his life. We see his development as a young artist through early landscapes and character studies, but it is the paintings from Nussbaum’s final years that define him and his artistic legacy. They bear names like “Fear,” “The Refugee,” “Prisoner,” “The Damned” and “The Triumph of Death” — titles reflecting his own experiences in the ghetto and Nazi concentration camps.

Most of Nussbaum’s surrealist paintings went unseen by the wider world for the first 25 years following his July 1944 arrest in Nazi-occupied Brussels. When he went into hiding in Belgium, Nussbaum entrusted the bulk of his paintings to a family friend, who ended up keeping them in a damp attic for decades. In 1971, due to the efforts of one of Nussabaum’s only surviving relatives, the paintings were reclaimed, restored and exhibited in a retrospective, reminding the world of Nussbaum’s talent — and of the tragedy that befell him.

Art and Remembrance is narrated by Christian Jacque, who was only a boy when his parents hid Nussbaum and his wife, Felka Platek, in their Brussels home. Jacque recalls how the compounding effects of exile, imprisonment and prevailing antisemitism caused Nussbaum to load his later work full of “apprehension, anxiety and fear.” These feelings proved well-founded. Jacque tells of the morning the secret police broke down the door to his parents’ home, arrested the Nussbaums, and put them on the last train to Auschwitz.

At the time of the film’s release, there were no Jews living in Osnabrück. Those who survived the Holocaust did not return to this small German town whose citizens had passively watched as their Jewish neighbors were assembled in the courtyard of Osnabrück castle and then loaded into cars bound for death camps.

But now, captured in the film’s fascinating latter portion, the grandchildren of those non-Jewish Osnabrück citizens come together in a classroom to study Nussbaum’s paintings and share their thoughts about the Holocaust and Jews in general. While many confess respect for Nussbaum’s work and shame about the genocide, there is an undercurrent of lingering distrust of Jews, whose origins seem hazy at best, especially when a show of hands reveals that none of the teens interviewed has even one Jewish acquaintance.

According to Jacque, such mixed reactions to Nussbaum’s work are not unusual in Germany, because his paintings have become “a testament and a catalyst forcing the people to confront the past and the denial of that past.” Despite misgivings amongst some Germans, that confrontation gained a permanent home in 1998, with the opening of the Felix Nussbaum Museum in Osnabrück, where his paintings are on display.

To fully appreciate each of Felix Nussbaum’s masterpieces for their own merits would take far longer than the 29 minutes of Art and Remembrance, but taken together within the confines of a short time, they convey a better, more visceral understanding of the life, death and legacy of a man and a people who were taken too soon.
