= Fredy Hirsch =

German-Jewish youth leader

- Alfred Hirsch
- Born: Alfred Hirsch; 11 February 1916; Aachen, German Empire
- Died: 8 March 1944 (aged 28); Auschwitz-Birkenau, German-occupied Poland
- Occupations: Athlete, sports teacher, Zionist youth movement activist
- Organization(s): Jüdischer Pfadfinderbund Deutschland, Maccabi Hatzair
- Known for: Helping Jewish children during the Holocaust
- Partner: Jan Mautner

Alfred Hirsch (Hebrew: פרדי הירש; 11 February 1916 – 8 March 1944) was a German-Jewish athlete, sports teacher, and Zionist youth movement leader, notable for helping thousands of Jewish children during the German occupation of Czechoslovakia in Prague, Theresienstadt concentration camp, and Auschwitz. Hirsch was the deputy supervisor of children at Theresienstadt and the supervisor of the children's block at the Theresienstadt family camp at Auschwitz II-Birkenau.

Because of his German extraction, charisma, and careful appearance, he was able to convince SS guards to grant privileges to the children, including exemptions from deportation and extra rations, which saved their lives at least temporarily. Hirsch and his assistants maintained clandestine education under the difficult circumstances. Hirsch's insistence on exercise, discipline, and strict hygiene reduced death rates among the children.

The family camp was due to be liquidated on 8 March 1944; Hirsch's popularity made him a natural leader for an uprising. According to some accounts, he committed suicide in order not to have to witness the deaths of his charges; alternately, he was poisoned by Jewish doctors who would have been killed if an uprising had broken out.

== Early life ==
=== Germany ===
Hirsch was born in Aachen to Heinrich and Olga Hirsch on 11 February 1916; his father, who ran a butcher shop, died when he was ten years old. According to Fredy's niece, Raquel Masel, his brother, Paul Hirsch (1914–1979), was not close to their mother because of her bitterness. Their poor relationship encouraged Fredy and Paul to join youth organizations. Both brothers attended the Aachener Couven-Gymnasium, which was not a Jewish school. Fredy left in March 1931 when his mother moved, but there is no evidence that he attended another school, and apparently he continued to live in Aachen. The Jewish community of Aachen was well-integrated; there was little antisemitism in Aachen before the Nazi Party came to power in 1933. Hirsch was already giving lectures at the age of 15.

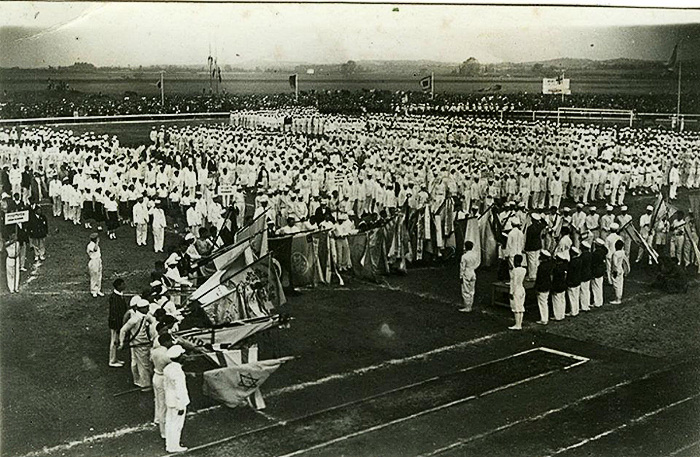
A ceremony at the first Maccabi Games, British Mandate of Palestine, 1932

Hirsch took over the leadership of the scouting branch of the local Aachen Jewish youth association in 1931, and participated in founding the Aachen branch of the Jüdischer Pfadfinderbund Deutschland (Jewish Scouting Association of Germany, JPD), a German Jewish scouting organization, in 1932. Later that year, Hirsch moved to Düsseldorf for a job with the JPD. The JPD had Zionist tendencies and a close affiliation with Maccabi Hatzair, a Zionist sporting association. Although Paul joined the JPD, he, like many in the Aachen Jewish community, believed in assimilating into the non-Jewish community. Fredy became an ardent Zionist, supporting the establishment of a Jewish state in then British Mandate of Palestine (now Israel).

Under the background of rising, state-sponsored antisemitism, the JPD training became increasingly militarized, emphasizing drills, marching with heavy loads, and first-aid training. In 1933, the JPD merged into Maccabi Hatzair. Hirsch moved to Frankfurt, where he shared a flat with leading JPD officials and led a scouting group. His time in Frankfurt was cut short by rumors that he was gay, based on his lack of a girlfriend and behavior towards some of the boys under his supervision, although he was not accused of inappropriate behavior or misconduct. He moved to Dresden in 1934, where he worked as a sports instructor for Maccabi Hatzair and probably attended lectures at the German College of Physical Education in Berlin. (Note: Witnesses claimed that Hirsch attended the German College of Physical Education in Berlin. Dirk Kämper found no evidence that Hirsch had ever been enrolled there, but stated that he probably attended lectures.)

=== Czechoslovakia ===
Germany's 1937 borders

After the passage of the Nuremberg Laws in 1935, Hirsch moved to Prague, Czechoslovakia, probably illegally. (Note: When Hirsch moved to Brno in 1936, the authorities noted that he could not prove that he had permission to live or work in Czechoslovakia.) According to German historian Dirk Kämper, the author of the first biography of Hirsch, he may have also been motivated to escape the increasing persecution of gay men in Germany. (Note: Homosexual behavior was also criminalized in Czechoslovakia, but there was a movement for repeal.) He continued to work for Maccabi Hatzair. The Czech branch of the organization was initially concerned about his reputation, but Hirsch was able to persuade Arthur Herzog, chairman of Maccabi Hatzair in the Czech lands, that his homosexuality did not affect his work.

Funded by the Zionist World Federation, Hirsch organized local Maccabi Games and set up youth and adult groups for physical education. He organized the 1937 Maccabi Games for Czechoslovakia held in Žilina, Slovakia, with 1,600 participants. Until 1940, Hirsch organized an annual youth camp at Bezpráví, where children and teenagers exercised and learned Hebrew. Paul, a Reform rabbinical student, emigrated with their mother and her second husband to Bolivia in 1938; Paul eventually became a rabbi in Buenos Aires. Fredy could have accompanied them, but did not; Paul later said that Fredy's Zionist convictions had prevented him.

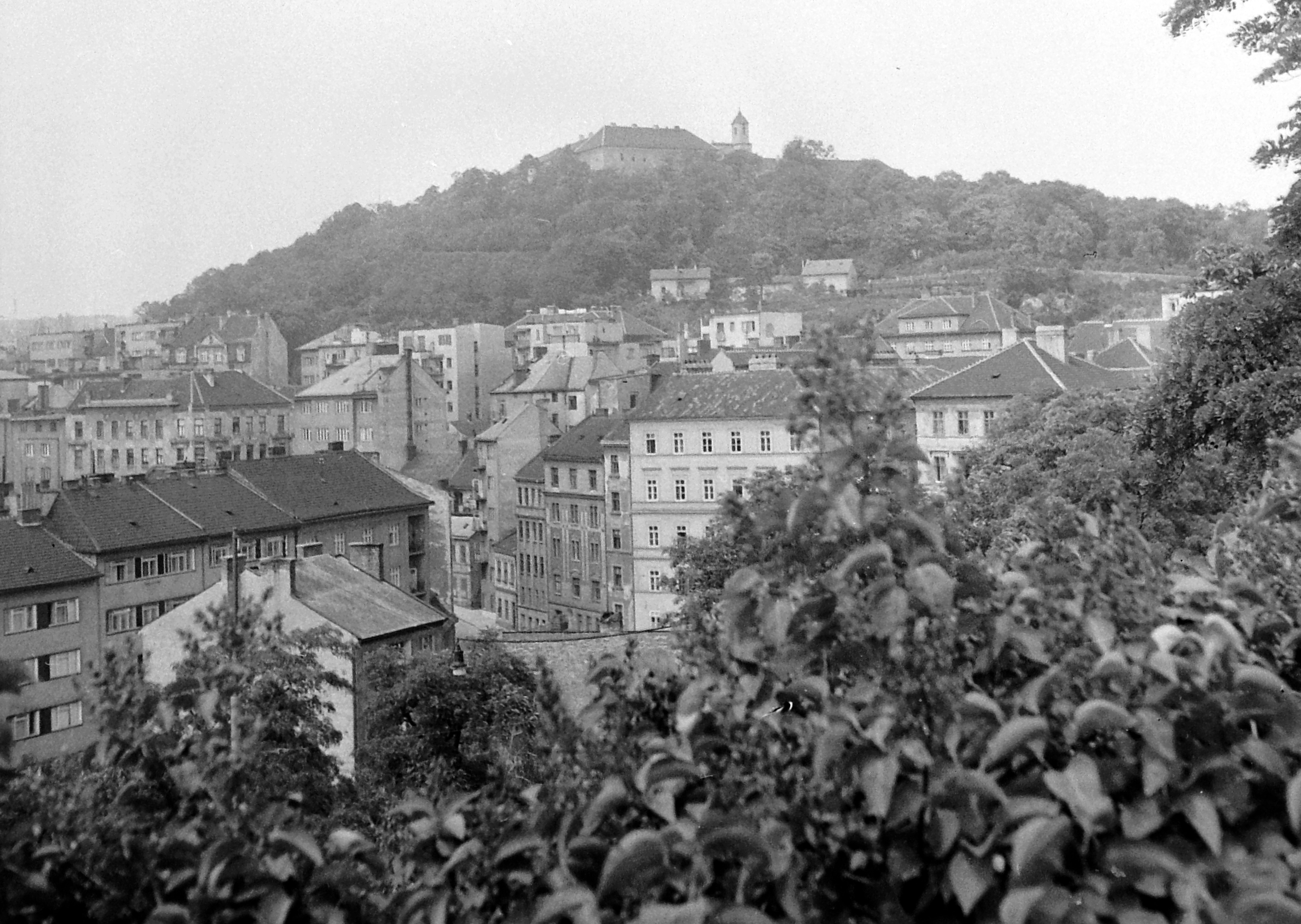
Brno in 1958

After Brno refused him a residence permit and threatened to expel him, Hirsch returned to Prague. Working at the Zionist Youth Aliyah School run by Egon Redlich, he organized hakhshara (preparation farms) for young Jews seeking to immigrate to the Land of Israel and live on a kibbutz, training youth in horticulture, agriculture, and basic military training. In late 1938, the Munich Agreement ceded the Sudetenland (German-speaking region of Czechoslovakia) to Germany; on 15 March 1939, Germany invaded Czechoslovakia, creating the Protectorate of Bohemia and Moravia. Assimilation of the Czech Jews was so high that many children were not even aware that they were Jews. Eighteen boys trained by Hirsch were able to escape to Denmark in October 1939, and immigrated to Palestine the following year. He drew lots with another Zionist youth leader as to which of them would go to Palestine with the boys; Hirsch lost and remained in Prague. In 1940, he was joined by Mautner, who was prevented from continuing his studies by the closure of the Czech universities. The same year, Hirsch published an article in the Prague Jewish Newspaper laying out his views on Jewish youth education; Hirsch viewed physical education as essential to promoting well-being and a Zionist consciousness.

Over time, the Germans applied more and more restrictions to Czech Jews; they were fired from their jobs, forced to move, had property confiscated, were forbidden from certain shops and streets, and eventually forced to wear the Star of David. After the Nazis banned Jews from public spaces, Hirsch organized a playground at Hagibor, in the Strašnice district of Prague, for Jewish children to exercise. Hirsch and Mautner held soccer matches, athletic competitions, study groups, and theatrical performances there. Although there were other carers, Hirsch's charisma made him the natural leader. Since he could not speak Czech well, he gave instructions in Hebrew and taught the children to speak that language. Survivors reported that Czech songs were written about him. In late 1941, the Nazis began deporting Czech Jews, first to the Łódź Ghetto. Hirsch helped prepare the deportees with the 50 kilograms (110 lb) of luggage they were allowed to bring.

== The Holocaust ==
=== Theresienstadt ===
Hirsch performing gymnastics at Hagibor

Hirsch was one of the first Jews to be transported to Theresienstadt concentration camp on 4 December 1941, where he helped to construct the concentration camp. His friendship with Jakob Edelstein lead to an appointment with the housing department. Later, Hirsch became the deputy to Egon Redlich, the leader of the Youth Services Department; (Note: Also known as the Youth Welfare Office.) Redlich personally disliked Hirsch, (Note: Known to hold homophobic attitudes, Redlich fired a young woman from a teaching position at Theresienstadt when he found out that she was in a lesbian relationship.) but respected his competence and leadership ability. Mautner was also deported to Theresienstadt in early 1942. At Theresienstadt, the children lived separately from the adults. Based on the teachings of Zionist youth movements, Hirsch insisted on maintaining self-esteem, discipline, regular exercise and strict hygiene—even holding cleanliness competitions—in order to maximize their chances of survival. The youth leaders tried to maintain the children's education despite this being prohibited, teaching a wide range of subjects including Hebrew, English, mathematics, history, and geography. However, the Germans did not actively oppose his activities because they felt that it helped maintain order. Children 14 and older had to work; Hirsch tried to get them jobs working in the vegetable gardens because he believed that this work would improve their health and prepare them for life in Palestine.

Survivors often remarked on Hirsch's self-confident attitude, good looks, and careful appearance, which had a salutary effect on other prisoners. He paid attention to his posture and appearance, keeping his hair combed and boots polished, and reportedly continuing to pomade his hair at Auschwitz. Hirsch was able to establish a good relationship with SS guards even though he was Jewish and openly gay. (Note: "Indeed, it was well known in Prague that Hirsch was gay. Nor did he hide it at Theresienstadt – Terezín in Czech – or Auschwitz. 'We’d heard that Fredy was gay,' [Dita] Kraus (es) told me in an interview, 'but we didn’t care about that at all. It wasn’t an issue anywhere.'" Zuzana Růžičková later described being helped by Hirsch after her arrival at Theresienstadt; she heard that he was gay and asked her parents about it. They told her that it only mattered whether he was a good person or not. Due to homophobic attitudes common at the time, male adolescents were warned not to be alone with him.) According to Yehuda Bacon, "he spoke German as well as the Nazis, he had charm and a tip-top look. He knew how to talk to the SS. He was dressed like a soldier." Pavel Stránský, who had been an educator on the children's block at Auschwitz, testified that "[t]he SS treated him almost like a human being". (Note: German: Die SS behandelte ihn fast wie ein menschliches Wesen Heinz Moll in l in Beilage Literatur, Prager Zeitung, 10 May 2001, p. 10. Quoted in Hartung-Gorre Verlag (2008))

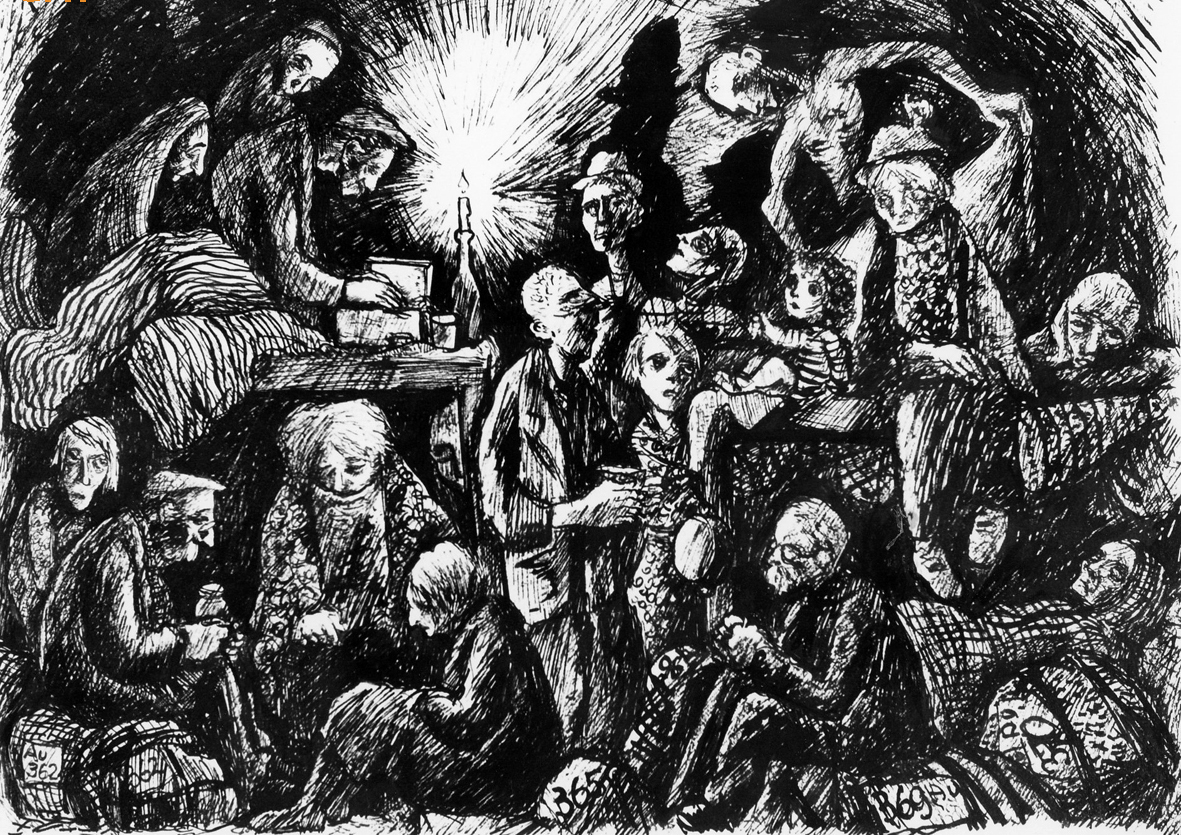
Bedřich Fritta's caricature of Theresienstadt living quarters

Redlich and Hirsch used their influence to arrange separate barracks and slightly better conditions for the children. Sometimes they were able to remove children from transports to extermination camps, although they were ultimately unable to save them from this fate; more than 99% of the children at Theresienstadt were eventually deported. Hirsch persuaded the Germans to allocate space for a play area inside the concentration camp, where he frequently oversaw athletic activities. In 1943, Maccabi Games were held and observed by thousands of spectators.

On 24 August 1943, a single transport of 1,200 children from the Białystok Ghetto arrived at Theresienstadt. These children were frightened of the showers because they believed that they were gas chambers. The Białystok children were housed in the western barracks, separated from the rest of the camp by a barbed-wire fence. Czech gendarmes guarded the perimeter and kept the children strictly segregated from the rest of the camp under threat of severe punishment. According to Kämper, Hirsch wanted to confirm the rumors that Jews deported from Theresienstadt were murdered in gas chambers. In any event, he managed to jump over the wire fence separating the Białystok children from the rest of the Theresienstadt prisoners, but he was caught and arrested by a Czech guard. Peter Erben believes that Hirsch could have avoided punishment if he had been able to speak Czech. Instead, he was brought to the commandant's office and beaten. Allegedly for this violation, he was deported to Auschwitz on 8 September.

=== Auschwitz ===
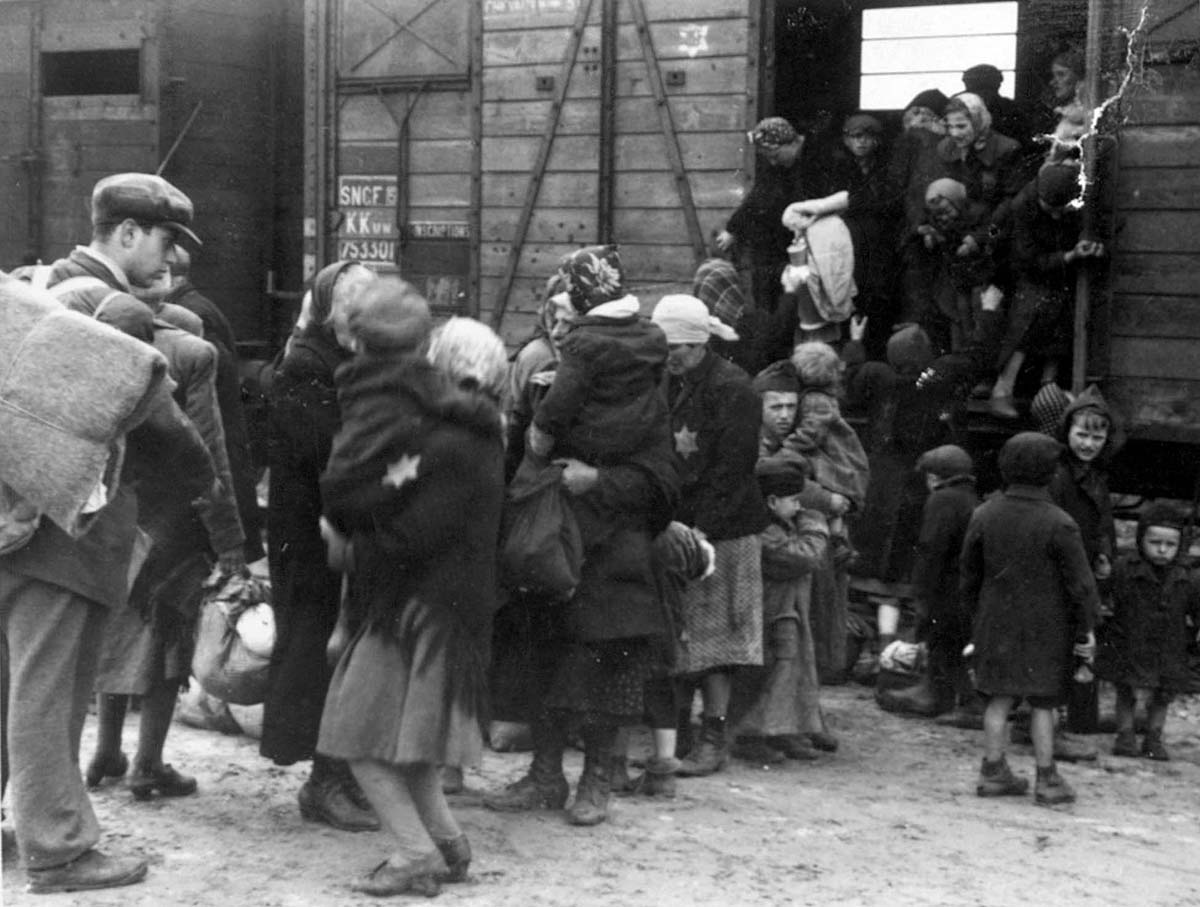
Carpathian Ruthenian Jews disembark at Birkenau, May 1944

The Jews from Theresienstadt encountered unprecedented privileged treatment upon their arrival, where they were established in a separate block (BIIb), known as the Theresienstadt family camp. They were tattooed, but were not subject to selection upon arrival, were allowed to retain their civilian clothes, and were not forced to shave their heads. Families stayed together and were also allowed to write to their relatives at Theresienstadt, to those not yet deported, and even to friends in neutral countries, in order to convey the impression that deportation to the east did not necessarily mean death.

Hirsch was appointed the lagerälteste of the family camp, because of the respect that the SS had for his leadership. He refused to use violence against other prisoners, as the Germans demanded. As a result, he was relieved of his position a month later and replaced by the German criminal Arno Böhm. However, he persuaded Böhm to allocate a barracks, Block 31, for children younger than fourteen, and became the overseer of this barracks. In this arrangement, the children lived with their parents at night and spent the day at the special barracks. Hirsch recruited adult prisoners who had been involved in education at Theresienstadt and persuaded the guards that it would be in their interest to have the children learn German. In fact, the teachers taught other subjects, including history, music, and Judaism, in Czech, as well as a few German phrases to recite at inspections. Because there were only twelve books and almost no supplies, the teachers had to recite lessons from memory. The children's lack of education—they had been excluded from school even before their deportation—made their task more difficult. A chorus rehearsed regularly, a children's opera was performed, and the walls of the barracks were painted with Disney characters by Dina Gottliebová. Because the block was so orderly, it was shown off to SS men who worked in other parts of the camp. SS men who directly participated in the extermination process, especially Dr. Josef Mengele, visited frequently and helped organize better food for the children.

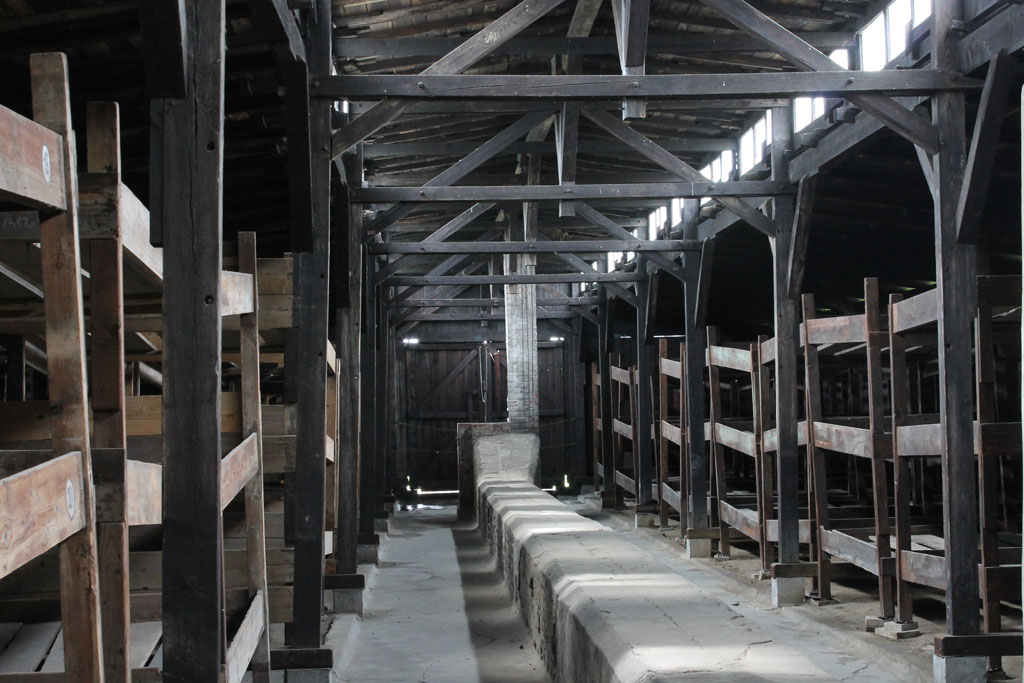
Reconstructed barracks at Auschwitz

Using his influence with the Germans, Hirsch obtained better food for the children and food parcels addressed to prisoners who had died. The soup for the children was thicker than for other prisoners; allegedly it was from the Gypsy camp and contained semolina. The children's barracks also received additional coal and were slightly better heated. Hirsch also convinced the Germans to hold roll call inside the barracks, so the children were spared the hours-long ordeal of standing outside in all weather. After another transport arrived in December 1943, there were about 700 children in the family camp; Mautner was also on this transport. (Note: During the second liquidation of the family camp in July 1944, Mautner was selected for labor. He survived Auschwitz, Sachsenhausen, and a death march back to Theresienstadt. However, he contracted tuberculosis in the camps and died in 1951; his partner, Walter Löwy, whom Mautner met after the war, later emigrated to Munich.) Zuzana Růžičková, who had also arrived in December, entered into the children's barracks without authorization in order to obtain work as a carer, but was caught by an SS man. To distract him, Hirsch reportedly said "Herr Oberscharführer, who have you killed and looted today?" (Note: German: ja also Herr Oberscharführer, wo haben Sie denn heute wieder getötet und geplündert?) Instead of beating Hirsch, the SS man offered him a cigarette, which Hirsch declined. Nevertheless, Hirsch was not excepted from the brutal treatment of the guards, being badly beaten when a boy slept through the roll call.

Hirsch persuaded Böhm to allocate a second barracks for children aged three to eight so that the older children could prepare a performance of Snow White, which the SS had requested. The play was performed on 23 January 1944 with many SS men in attendance. By imposing strict discipline on the children, Hirsch made sure that there were no acts of violence or theft, otherwise common in concentration camps. He was extremely strict about the children's hygiene, insisting that they wash daily even in the frigid winter of 1943–44 and carrying out regular inspections for lice. Due to Hirsch's efforts, the mortality rate for the children was nearly zero, compared to the overall mortality of about 25% of the residents of the family camp in the first six months. The children appreciated Hirsch's efforts on their behalf, and threw a surprise party for him on 11 February 1944, his 28th birthday. In February 1944, a delegation from the Reich Security Main Office and the German Red Cross visited the family camp. The visitors were most interested in the children's barracks, which was the only attempt to organize education at Auschwitz. The most notable visitor, Adolf Eichmann, commented favorably about the cultural activity of the children at Birkenau.

=== Death ===
Arrivals to the 'family camp' were marked "SB6"— a cryptic abbreviation that the resistance movement in Auschwitz eventually decoded as referring to Sonderbehandlung ("special treatment"). This meant that the arrivals were scheduled to be murdered six months later namely on 8 March 1944. The Nazis had their own reasons for this deception, namely to delude family relatives still in Theresienstadt into thinking everything was well in the 'family camp' of Auschwitz-Birkenau.

Hirsch and other leaders from Theresienstadt were informed in advance by the resistance movement at Auschwitz. Rudolf Vrba (1924-2006) was one of the leading conspirators that used his administrative position as 'Schreiber' ('official clerk') to move around and seek contacts. By this time, it was evident to the prisoners that the Germans were going to lose the war and some hoped for a swift Allied victory before their six months had elapsed.

Although there was no possibility of success, many Jews wanted to set fire to the barracks within the family-compound as a symbolic act of resistance, but the majority soon settled into the every day rhthyms of work. The male prisoners engaged with irrigation projects and the renovation of the 'family camp,' while the women were employed in a textile cooperative run by the DAW ('Deutsche Ausrüstungswerke'), the main German organization for wares and workshops. This was located within the family-compound so that the women could be near to their children. The children themselves thanks to Hirsch and his charisma had their own school and play area. Hirsch was the natural leader of the community and realised the fatal consequences an uprising could have. Hence, he played for time and tried to bring together the opposing factions in the family camp, whose views he greatly respected.

On 5 March 1944, as the six months neared its close, the 'September Arrivals' were told that they were soon to be transported to a labor camp at Heydebreck. They were instructed to write postcards dated 25 March for their relatives in Theresienstadt that were waiting to hear from them. This was all part of the Nazi deception plan to convey the impression that everything was well. On 7 March, they were moved to the quarantine block (BIIa). Although warned in advance that the Nazis were planning to murder them Hirsch remained present as their awe-inspiring communal leader. Nevertheless, his conscience greatly troubled him as he thought about the fate of the children.

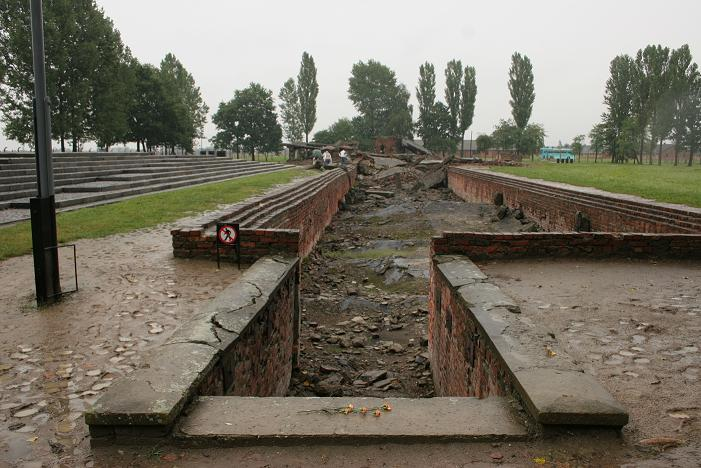
Crematorium II

What happened after this is unclear. Rudolf Vrba, the clerk of BIIa, visited Hirsch on 6 and again on 8 March to inform him about the preparations for the liquidation of the family-compound often referred to as the 'Theresienstadt Family Camp.' Vrba urged him to lead an uprising. Apparently Hirsch was uncertain whether to believe the warnings about imminent death and remained skeptical of the value of resistance. He thought it was unreasonable that the Nazis would give them such favored treatment only to murder them later. Hirsch asked for an hour to consider the situation, and when Vrba returned, Hirsch was in a coma. A Jewish doctor told Vrba that Hirsch had committed suicide by a barbiturate overdose. If he did commit suicide, it is unclear how he could have obtained a lethal dose without the cooperation of the doctors.

According to some survivors, (Note: Including Ruth Bondy, Ota Kraus, and Dita Kraus.) Hirsch requested a small dose of a tranquilizer to help him calm down, but the Jewish doctors poisoned him, so it is alleged, to prevent him from leading an uprising, which they feared would compromise their own chances of survival. SS Lagerarzt Josef Mengele (1911-1979) had already promised the doctors that they would not be killed.

The explanation conveying the attitude of the doctors and thereby disqualifying the claim that Hirsch committed suicide is a view favored by Hirsch's biographer Kämper. As it turned out a few people from other compounds and barracks were spared from death to fit into Mengele's schemes. In this way some doctors and the artist Dina Gottliebová were able to survive. But how many Mengele envisaged 'saving' from the 'Theresienstadt Family Camp' for his 'rueful experiments' remains unclear. According to survivor testimonies Hirsch was to be spared as well, but he was unwilling to save himself without the children.

However, the SS (and Mengele was no exception) often made facetious short-term promises. That belonged to their unique satirical behaviour. According to the Wetzler-Vrba Report the SS made promises to Hirsch for the welfare of the children in his care. Indeed, they supported his efforts within the 'family-camp' to achieve more autonomy against the aggressive compound-overseer, the lagerälteste Arno Böhm (1913-1962). But such promises of protection have to be seen within the wider context of the SS whose sole aim was the fulfilment of the 'Final Solution.'

Hirsch's prospects of survival given the facetious outlook of the SS were slim. All of the Theresienstadt Jews who had arrived in Auschwitz-Birkenau on 7 September 1943 were gassed late on the night of 8/9 March 1944. The only promise Mengele kept was to personally safeguard 11 twins among the children. He himself could not act outside of the agreed general policy of 'Sonderbehandlung' that had earmaked the 'Theresienstadt Jews' for annihlation. Hence, the selected twins were forcibly taken from their parents amidst Mengele's false promises that the children would be well.

Hirsch was gassed along with the other adults and all the remaining children - some 3,791 souls. This reveals the magnitude of the operation to dispose of them in one evening. The victims, under strict curfew, were taken from the quarantine area (Block IIa) and loaded in trucks before being driven to the gas chambers. Still unconscious, Hirsch was carried with them and was murdered along with the children whom he had loved and given his very best to under his supervision.

Only two of the children that had been in Hirsch's care survived: the twins 14 year old Jiří (*1929-) and Zdeněk Steiner (1929-1947). They had been among the 11 twins Mengele had selected. In the transcript of their oral testimony given before Dmitrij Andreevič Popov of the Red Army on 16 February 1945 Jiří describes the night of 8th March 1944:

At 8 0' Clock in the evening around 30-40 trucks arrived at the barracks of my parents and began loading the people. As prisoners refused to climb in the German guards opened fire and forced the people into the trucks that were driven away. We tried to pursue the trucks that turned off into the direction of Crematorium Number IV. From there no one came back. There followed a few more journeys but we were able to conclude that nobody from the 'Quarantine-Area' was left alive.

In this way the 3,791 adults and children of the 'Theresienstadt Family Camp' were liquidated. One may argue how Fredy Hirsch may have wanted to avoid a martyr's death but the aura that goes with his name speaks for itself. Rudolf Vrba had informed him in their meetings on 6 and 8 March how if it came to an uprising (with the participation of the Jewish Sonderkommando) the children would probably not survive.

Since Hirsch's loyalty had always been for the children in his care one may assume how he wouldn't have wished a violent haphazard end for them amidst shooting, panic and chaos that would have accompanied a revolt. Had an uprising occurred it would only have ended with widespread massacre and perhaps only a few of the adults escaping. Vrba in his interview with Claude Lanzmann in 1985 insists Hirsch rejected this option and so seeing no way out chose death through suicide.

== Legacy ==
According to postwar testimonies, Hirsch was "a man of extraordinary courage" and "for the children a God", although some of his adult colleagues dismissed him as arrogant, shallow, dictatorial, or vain. The gymnasium in Aachen that he attended renamed its cafeteria the "Fredy-Hirsch-AG" in 2016 to commemorate his 100th birthday. At a commemoration ceremony in the Aachen synagogue on the one hundredth anniversary of Hirsch's birth, Lord Mayor Marcel Philipp stated that Hirsch was "one of the most important sons of the city, if not the best known". (Note: German: ein bedeutender Sohn der Stadt, wenn auch nicht der bekannteste.) Nina Weilová, who survived the Theresienstadt family camp as a young teenager, said that "There was no one who was so self-sacrificing and devoted himself to the children as much as he did." Czech Jewish harpsichordist Zuzana Růžičková worked as a teacher's assistant at the children's barracks at Auschwitz and credited Hirsch for saving her life. Many years later, she helped organize a monument for him. At the dedication, she said, "We Jews have no saints, but we have 'tzadikim'—the word could be translated as 'righteous' or 'decent'. Fredy Hirsch was a man, he had his faults, he was not a saint, but he was righteous—a tzadik—and so we hope that when the last of us who knew him have passed away, future generations will stand before this tablet and say: 'He must have been a good, brave and beautiful person'." (Note: German: Wir Juden haben keine Heiligen. Wir haben jedoch die ' Zaddikim ' - Gerechte - oder könnte man vielleicht übersetzen - Anständige? Fredy Hirsch war ein Mensch, er hatte seine Fehler, er war kein Heiliger. Er war jedoch ein Gerechter - ein Zaddik . Und so wollen wir hoffen, dass, wenn der Letzte von uns, die wir ihn kannten, dahingegangen ist, künftige Generationen vor dieser Tafel stehen bleiben und sagen: Dies muss ein guter, tapferer und schöner Mensch gewesen sein.)

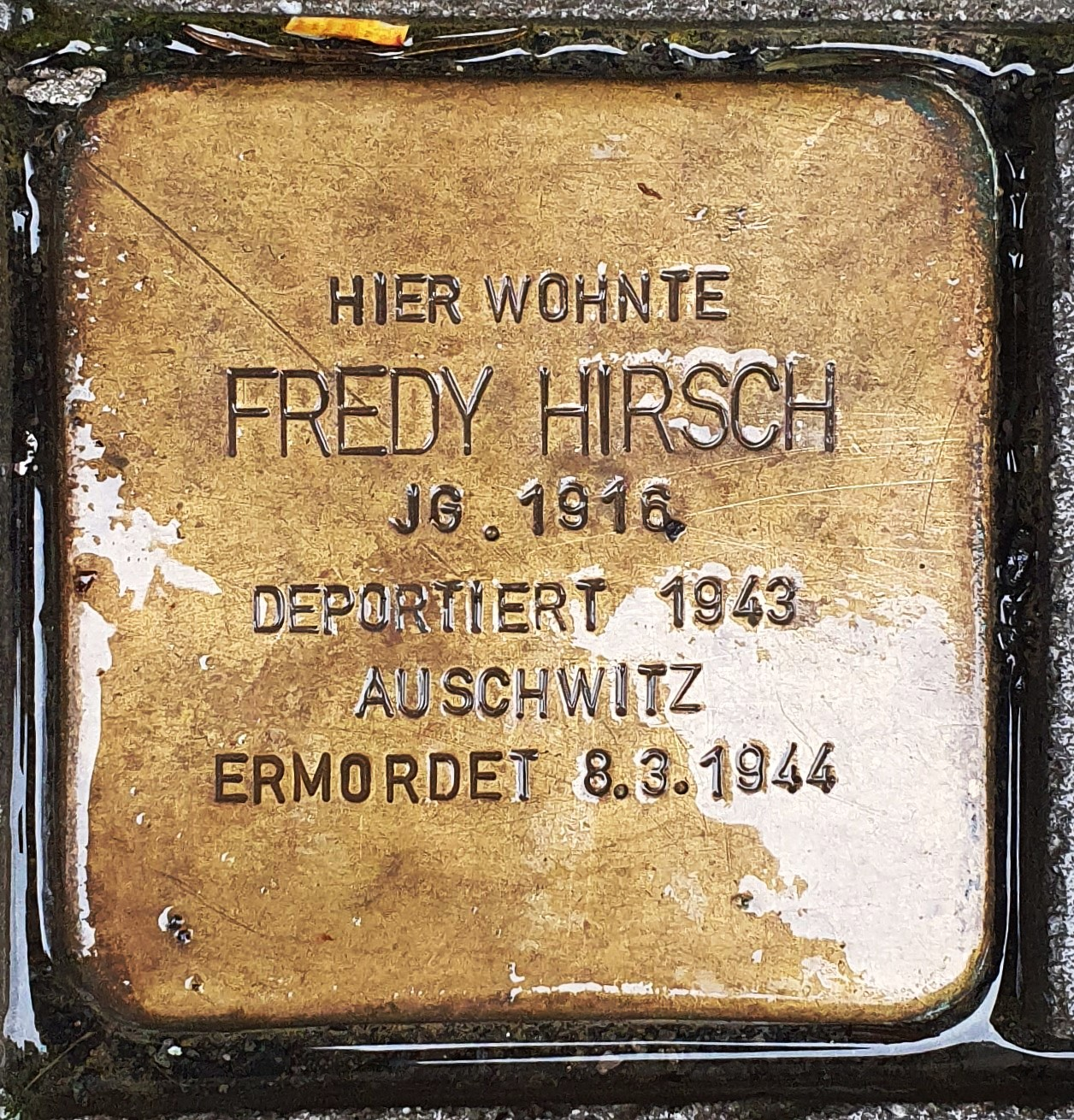
In 2008, a stolperstein for Hirsch was laid outside Richardstraße 7 in Aachen. In 2023, it was moved to Martin-Luther-Straße 7.

Hirsch was the subject of the 2016 documentary Heaven in Auschwitz, which featured the accounts of thirteen survivors of Theresienstadt and Auschwitz. He was also featured in the 2017 Israeli documentary "Dear Fredy" by Rubi Gat. According to Dirk Kämper, Hirsch's role was marginalized after the war because of his homosexuality. In communist Czechoslovakia, his German ethnicity and Zionism made him an unacceptable hero. Historian Anna Hájková, investigating the relationship between Hirsch and Mautner, writes that theirs was "one of the rare queer life stories that can be reconstructed for the Nazi era". (Note: German: eine der seltenen queeren Lebensgeschichten, die sich für die NS-Zeit rekonstruieren lassen.) Hirsch is the rare exception to the absent or anonymous gay Holocaust victim because he worked with children and teenagers, who lived long enough to tell the truth about him.

On 11 February 2021 Google celebrated his 105th birthday with a Google Doodle. The Doodle was displayed in Germany, Czech Republic, Slovakia and Israel.

== See also ==
- Persecution of homosexuals in Nazi Germany
