= Eyewitness (1999 film) =

1999 film

- Directed by: Bert Van Bork
- Distributed by: Seventh Art Releasing
- Release date: 1999
- Country: United States
- Language: English

Eyewitness is a 1999 American short documentary film directed by Bert Van Bork. It was nominated for an Academy Award for Best Documentary Short. The explored the lives of three artists forced to work in secret while living in Nazi death camps: Jan Komski, Dinah Gottliebova and Felix Nussbaum, and who witnessed and painted the horrors of the Holocaust.
