= Marianne Grant =

Czech-Scottish Jewish artist

Mausi Grant
- Grant in 1951 on the day of her wedding
- Born: Mariana Hermannová; 19 September 1921; Prague, Czechoslovakia
- Died: 11 December 2007 (aged 86); Glasgow, Scotland
- Education: Rotter Studio Prague, Glasgow School of Art
- Spouse: Jack Grant
- Parents: Rudolf Hermann (father); Anna Hermann (mother)

Marianne "Mausi" Grant (19 September 1921 – 11 December 2007) was a Czech-Scottish Jewish artist, who survived the Holocaust after being imprisoned in three successive concentration camps. Grant was born during the interwar period and came from a prosperous family. From a young age, Grant loved drawing and painting but her plans to study art at university were stymied after the invasion of Czechoslovakia in March 1939 by Nazi Germany. In June 1939, the Nuremberg racial laws were implemented and Grant and her family faced increasingly stringent restrictions that lead them to be interred at a camp in Prague and then later deported to the Theresienstadt Ghetto in May 1942. Grant spent 18 months in the ghetto before being transferred to Auschwitz concentration camp. In Auschwitz, Grant used her painting skills in exchange for food and medicine and to make the children's block where she worked, more homely. However, her work come to the notice of Josef Mengele, who used Grant to paint family trees of dwarfs and twins. After 7 months, Grant was sent to forced labour battalion and later Bergen-Belsen concentration camp. When she was liberated, she was sent to Sweden to recuperate and met her future husband. They married and settled in Glasgow. After the war, she finished her education at the Glasgow School of Art. In 2002, Grant's paintings and drawings were exhibited at Kelvingrove Art Gallery and Museum. 22 members of Grant's family died in the Holocaust.

== Life ==
Grant was the only child in a comfortable middle-class family who lived in Prague in Czechoslovakia. Her father was Rudolf Hermann (c.1888–1938), the manager of the foreign exchange department of the Bohemian Union Bank in Prague. Hermann came from a large family of hop farmers from the village of Czirima, near Szadek. Her mother was Anna née Rosner (1889–1973), a milliner and one of three sisters from Moravia. The couple were married in 1920 and decided to settle in Prague. Grant was an indirect relative of the novelist Franz Kafka through her maternal uncle, Joseph Pollack who was married to the author's sister, Valli Kafka.

In the autumn of 1951, Marianne married Jack Grant (born Jaakov Horst Grodszinksy), a German Jewish refugee living in Glasgow. Grodszinksy's family came from Koningsburg in East Prussia. His family sent him to the UK prior to the start of World War II on a Kindertransport. His whole family eventually perished in Auschwitz. The couple initially lived in Battlefield in Glasgow, before moving to Newton Mearns in East Renfrewshire. The couple had three children together, Susan, Geraldine and Garry.

== Education ==
After primary school in Prague, Grant attending the private Prague English Grammar School, universally known as "PEGS", where she learned to speak English. As a young child, Grant loved to draw and paint and it would eventually become her forte. Her early work was published in the children's corner of the local newspaper. In 1937, Grant attended the Vilém Rotter Studio of Art and Graphic Design, against considerable hostility from her father, who preferred that she went to university. The studio had an international reputation and was known for its modernist design

In April 1938, Grant's father died. She had originally decided to attend the Bezalel Academy of Arts and Design in Jerusalem, but after her father's death, Grant decided to stay with her mother. During that period she volunteered with the El Al organisation in Prague. El Al was a Czech alternative to the Tekhelet Lavan, a labour Zionist youth organisation, that was formed in Prague in January 1937.

== Annexation ==
After the Munich Agreement of September 1938, Germany annexed the German-majority populated Sudetenland from Czechoslovakia and in March 1939 Adolf Hitler occupied the Czech rump state. On 15 March 1939, the Germans were ordered to occupy the provinces of Bohemia and Moravia, which included Prague and that changed Grant's life irrevocably. The Germans drafted the Czech men to work in coal mines, in the iron and steel industry, and in armaments production. Grant volunteered to work on farms in Moravia. In June 1939, Konstantin von Neurath declared that all Czech Jews would be legally re-defined in accordance with the Nuremberg Laws, the Nazi racial law. In September 1940, Grant and her mother were forced to wear the Jewish Star to indicate they were Jewish.

On 28 April 1942, Grant and her mother were taken to an exhibition centre in Prague that was used as an internment camp. On 1 May 1942 Grant and her mother were ordered to leave Prague, to be deported to Theresienstadt Ghetto. The fortress town of Theresienstadt, built in the 19th century by Joseph II was formerly a Czech Army garrison. When they left, the first Jewish folk to arrive along with Grant and her mother, lived in the old army barracks. While there, Grant worked in the youth gardens, where young girls and boys worked, which gave her and her mother access to better food. This gave Grant a level of protection that was provided by the Germans. However Grant's mother Anna wasn't protected and she was scheduled to be sent "East" three times and each time Grant managed to secure her release from the train. At the time nobody in the camp knew what "East" meant. However, on the fourth time in December 1943, her mother was sent to a cattle wagon on the train and Grant was unable to get her released. Grant left all her paintings behind and took a separate wagon on the train. Grant was in Theresienstadt for about 18 months When they finally arrived, they found they were in Auschwitz concentration camp.

== Auschwitz ==
Grant and her mother arrived during a freezing cold night and she was in shock as she watched prisoners in striped uniforms remove the dead bodies from the cattle wagons. New arrivals were processed by the SS guards who told them to strip and march past an official who sorted them by sending them to a left or right column. One column that contained children, the elderly and the infirm, who were immediately murdered in the gas chamber. Grant and her mother survived the first day and after some days she was assigned to play with the children, in the children's block. While there she would draw with the children, as it was the most lively place in the camp, using what materials that she found. At the request of Fredy Hirsch, Grant along with Czech artist Dina Gottliebová painted a mural in the children's block that displayed Eskimos, Indians, Africans, countryside scenes and Disney characters.

One day a Slovak SS guard asked Grant to create an oil painting for his wife and draw books for his children. When she was ill with pleurisy, the SS guard gave Grant extra food and basic medicine allowing her to recover. When her painting and drawing became wider known, she came to the notice of Joseph Mengele. Mengele assigned her work in the dwarf camp where she would research the dwarfs family history then draw their family trees. Later she drew the family trees of twin families in black ink using an architect's drawing kit that was supplied by Mengele. All drawings were taken away from her. She also drew a mural in the children's block, depicting the youth of the world.

Grant was one of a number of artists who worked for Mengele. Czech artist Dina Gottliebová was assigned the insalubrious task of painting prisoners who had been the subject of genetic experimentation.

== Slave labour ==
After spending seven months in Auschwitz, Grant and her mother were reassigned. In July 1944. they were both sent to a labour battalion and transported to various forced labour camps around Hanover in Germany. On 5 April 1945, Grant and her mother were then transported to Bergen-Belsen concentration camp where they were confronted with the indescribable misery which Grant captured in watercolours. The camp was liberated on 15 April 1945, by the British 11th Armoured Division. Both Grant and her mother survived even though Anna contracted typhus. As Grant spoke English she was able to get a job as an interpreter to the British Army. In July 1945, Grant and her mother were transported to Malmö, Sweden by the Swedish Red Cross for medical treatment and recuperation, with the help of the White Buses operation. They lived there for several years. In November 1945 her drawings were publicly displayed in a Gothenburg exhibition. Through a friend from Gothenburg, who went to live in Glasgow, Grant met and began to correspond with Jaakov Horst Grodszinksy, a German refugee who lodged with the family. In the summer of 1951 Grodszinksy travelled to Sweden to meet Grant as part of a Shidduch.

== Glasgow ==
Jaakov Grodszinksy would later change his name to Jack Grant. When the couple moved to Newton Mearns, Jack Grant became the minister at Newton Mearns synagogue. In September 1951 the couple married in London and settled to live in Scotland.

== Exhibitions ==
Grant recreated the mural "Wall Drawings from the Childrens Block" for Yad Vashem for the "No Childs Play" exhibition in July 1997.

Although Grant brought her drawings and paintings when she migrated to Scotland, for almost 50 years they lay in a trunk in her home. In 2002, she decided to show her work in a permanent exhibit at Kelvingrove Art Gallery and Museum that depicts first-hand some of the atrocities in the Nazi concentration camps that she witnessed. At the same time, the Museum filmed an interview about her life and published a memoir "I Knew I Was Painting for My Life". (Note: The book title was later shortened to "Painting for My Life") The Scottish Government prepared an education pack that was based on the life experiences of Grant. It was distributed to every secondary school in Scotland. During the 2003 Holocaust Memorial Day celebrated in Edinburgh, Grant's pictures were displayed for a second time at the City Art Centre. In 2005, to mark the 60th anniversary of the liberation of Auschwitz by Soviet soldiers, a commemoration was held at Westminster Hall where Grant was introduced to the Queen.

== Bibliography ==
- Meacock, Joanna; Tuka, Peter; Cowan, Paula; Haase, Deborah; Shenkin, Geraldine (2021). Painting for my life : the Holocaust artworks of Marianne Grant. Glasgow: Glasgow Museums Publishing. ISBN 9781908638304.

== See also ==
- Dina Babbitt
