= Felix Nussbaum =

German painter

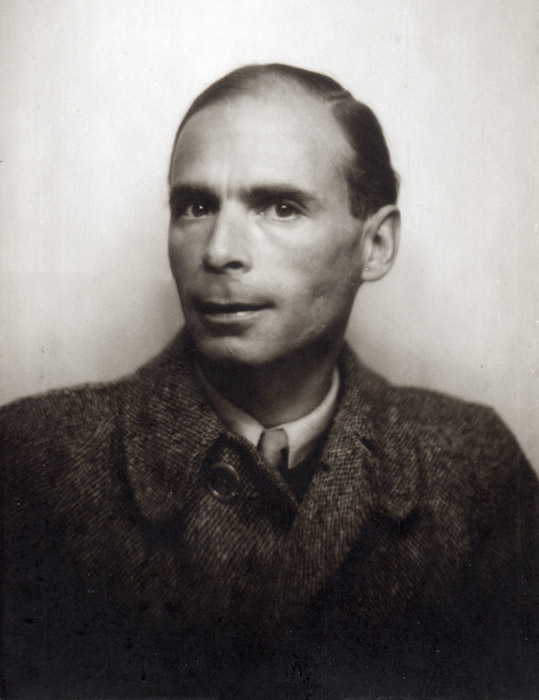
- Photography of Felix Nussbaum
- Born: 11 December 1904; Osnabrück, German Empire
- Died: 9 August 1944 (aged 39); Auschwitz, German-occupied Poland
- Known for: Painting
- Movement: New Objectivity
- Spouse: Felka Platek
- Website: www.felix-nussbaum.de

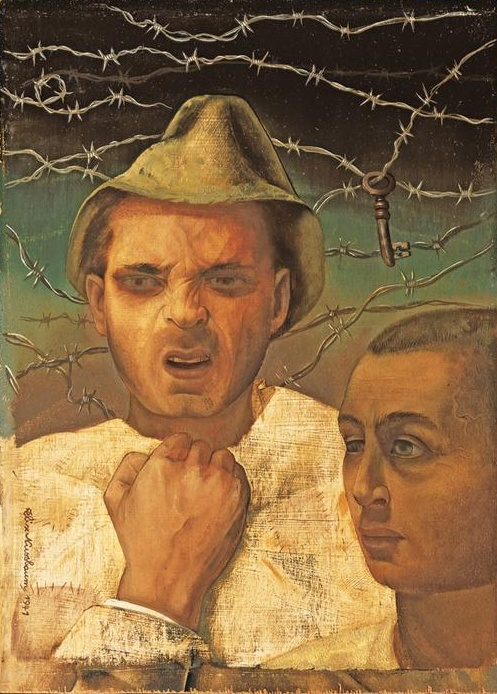
Self-Portrait of the German-Jewish surrealist Felix Nussbaum who was also interred in Camp St. Cyprien. He painted this while he was on the run in Belgium after escaping

Felix Nussbaum (11 December 1904 – after 20 September 1944) was a German-Jewish surrealist painter. Nussbaum's paintings, including Self Portrait with Jewish Identity Card (1943) and Triumph of Death (1944), explore his experiences as a Jew during the Holocaust. His work is usually associated with the New Objectivity movement, and was influenced by the works of Giorgio de Chirico, Henri Rousseau, and Vincent van Gogh. He took refuge in Belgium after the Nazi rise to power, but was deported to Auschwitz along with his wife Felka Platek only a few months before the British liberation of Brussels on 3 September 1944.

== Early life and education ==
Nussbaum was born in Osnabrück, Germany, to parents Rahel and Philipp Nussbaum. His father, a World War I veteran, was an amateur painter in his youth, until financial difficulties forced him to pursue more traditional work. This experience is said to have influenced his father to encourage Nussbaum to pursue art as a profession.

Nussbaum was a lifelong student, beginning his formal studies in 1920 in Hamburg and Berlin, and continuing as long as the tempestuous political situation allowed him. In his earlier works, Nussbaum was heavily influenced by Vincent van Gogh and Henri Rousseau, later taking influence from Giorgio de Chirico and Carlo Carrà as well. Nussbaum's careful approach to color may have been influenced by expressionist Karl Hofer.

In 1933, Nussbaum was studying under a scholarship in Rome at the Berlin Academy of the Arts when the Nazis seized control of Germany. When Adolf Hitler sent his Minister of Propaganda to Rome in April to disseminate Nazi artistic values, particularly the celebration of the Aryan race, Nussbaum realized that, as a Jew, he could not remain at the academy.

== Exile and hiding ==
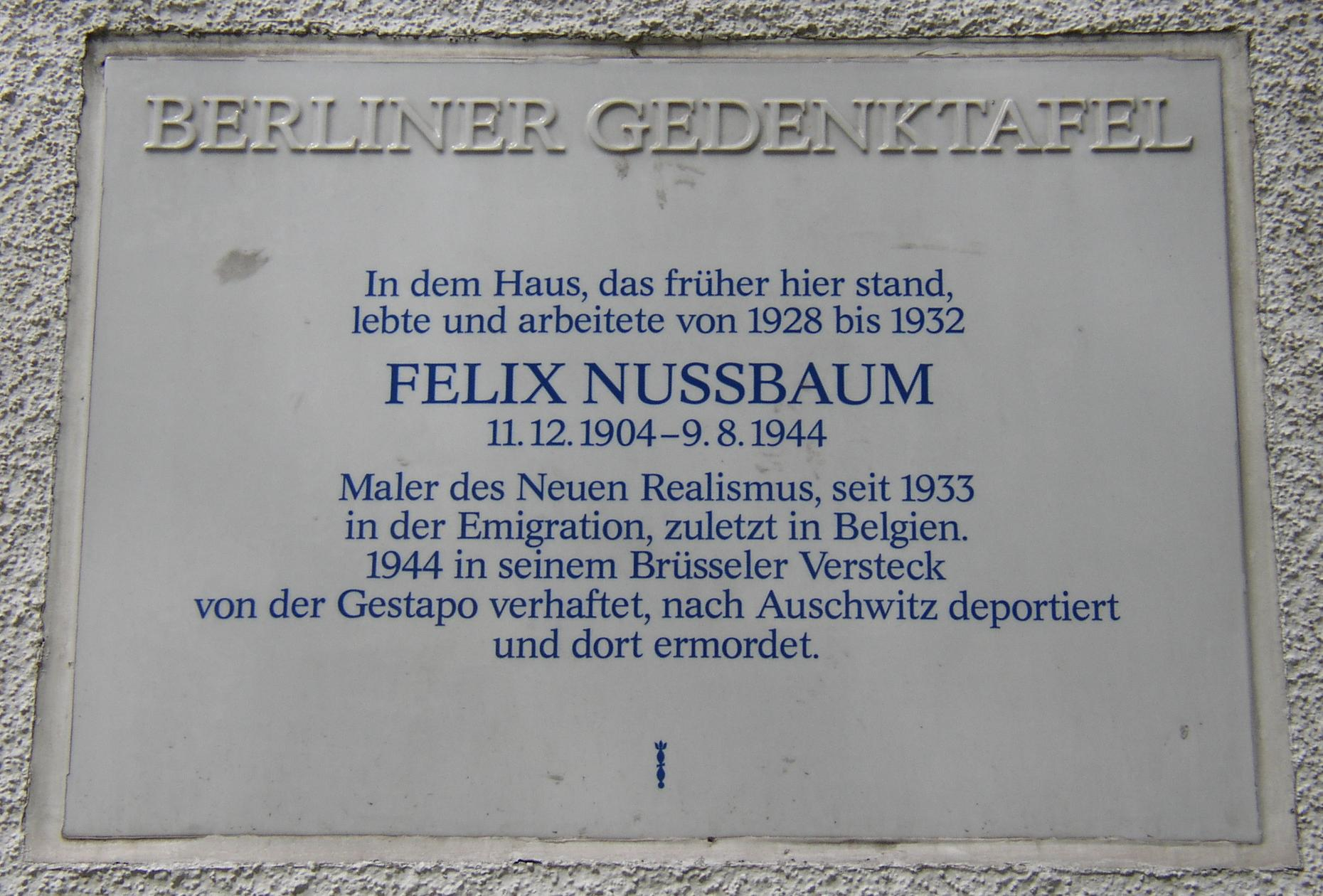
Plaque in front of former residence in Berlin-Wilmersdorf

The next decade of Nussbaum's life was characterized by fear, which is reflected in his artwork. While studying in Berlin, Nussbaum met painter Felka Platek; they would later marry in Brussels during their shared exile. In 1934, he took Platek to meet his parents in Switzerland. Felix's parents eventually grew homesick for Germany and, against his fierce objections, they returned. This was the last time Felix would see his mother and father – the source of his spiritual and financial support. Felix and Felka would spend the next ten years in exile, mostly in Belgium, a period of emotional and artistic isolation for him but also one of the most artistically productive times in his life.

After Nazi Germany attacked Belgium in 1940, Nussbaum was arrested by Belgian police as a "hostile alien" German, and was subsequently taken to the Saint-Cyprien camp in France. The desperate circumstances in the camp influenced his work during this time. He eventually signed a request to the French camp authorities to be returned to Germany. On the train ride from Saint-Cyprien to Germany, he managed to escape and settled with Felka in occupied Belgium, and they began a life in hiding. Without residency papers, Nussbaum had no way of earning an income, but friends provided him with shelter and art supplies so that he could continue his craft. In 1943 he painted The Self Portrait with a Jewish identity card. In the painting there is a tree ("Nussbaum" translates to "nut tree" in English) whose branches are cut, with one branch bearing blossoms.

== Deportation and murder ==
In the space of a single year, Nussbaum's entire family was murdered in the Holocaust. His parents, Philipp and Rahel, were murdered at Auschwitz in February, and in July Nussbaum and his wife were found hiding in an attic by German armed forces. They were arrested, sent to the Mechelen transit camp and given the numbers XXVI/284 and XXVI/285. On 2 August, they arrived at Auschwitz, and his wife was likely murdered upon arrival, while Nussbaum was assigned prisoner number B-3594. On 3 September, Nussbaum's brother was sent to Auschwitz, and on 6 September his sister-in-law and niece were also murdered there. In December, his brother died from exhaustion in the camp at Stutthof.

In 1955, Nussbaum was declared legally dead with 9 August 1944 selected as his date of death.

In 2014, researchers at the Russian state archives in Moscow identified a report from the Auschwitz infirmary dated 20 September 1944 that showed Nussbaum was treated for a blister on his left index finger. Nussbaum was not among the prisoners present on 27 January 1945 during the liberation of Auschwitz, and there are no known records of transfer to a separate concentration camp, leading researchers to conclude Nussbaum was murdered between 20 September 1944 and 27 January 1945.

== Major works ==
In this time period, Nussbaum created two of his best-known works: Self Portrait with Jewish Identity Card (1943), and Triumph of Death (1944).

=== Triumph of Death ===
Triumph of Death shows Nussbaum's attention to detail. According to his biography, Felix Nussbaum: Art Defamed; Art in Exile; Art in Resistance, the crumpled music score has the first several bars of "The Lambeth Walk", a popular song from the musical Me and My Girl. The words that would normally accompany the music are "Ev'rythin' free and easy / Do as you darn well pleasey".

== Selected paintings ==
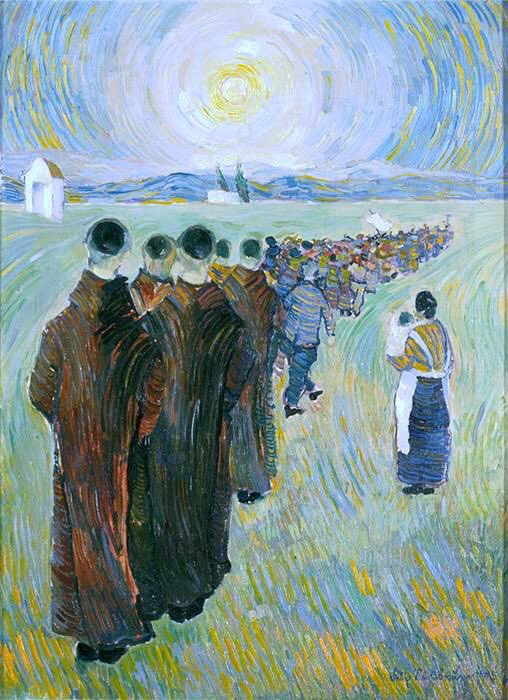
Remembering Grüßau

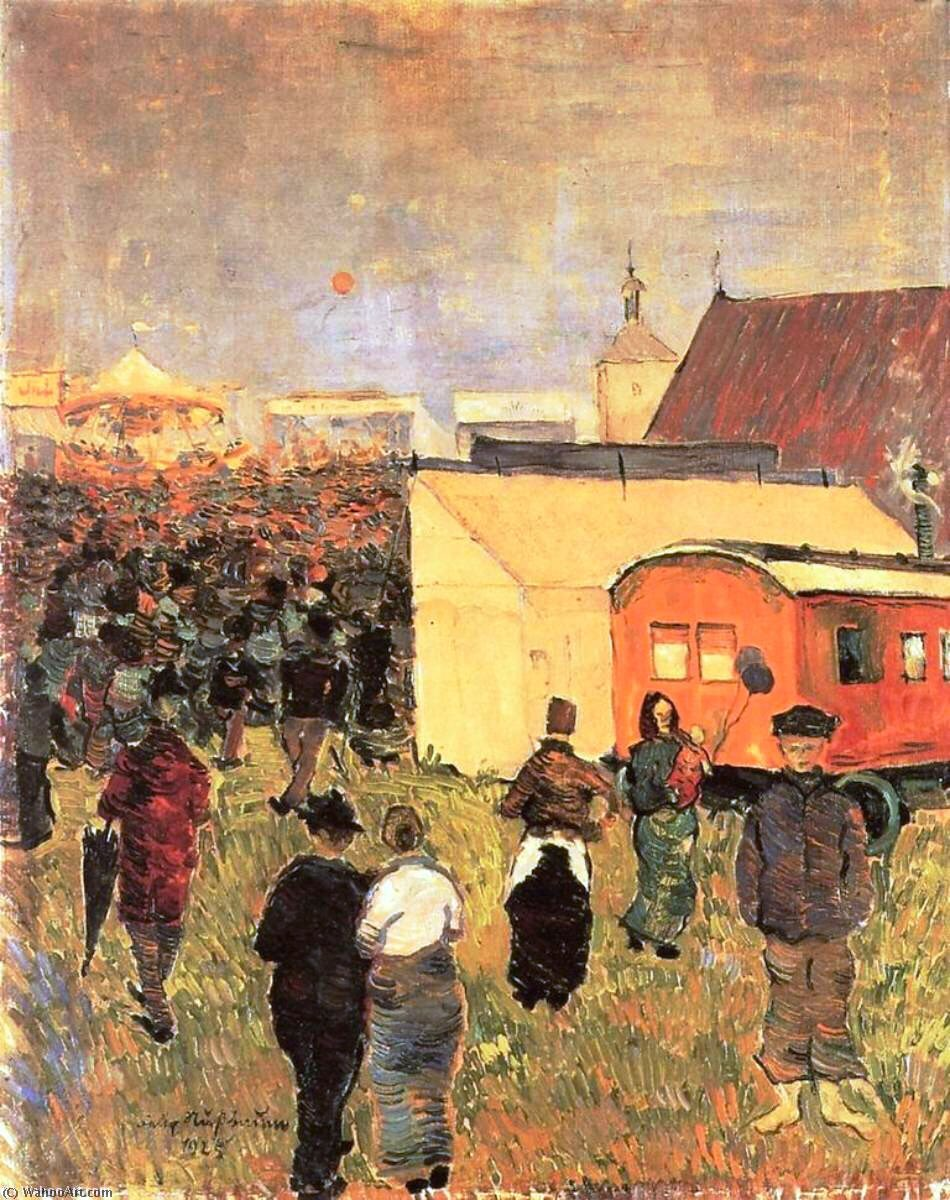
Fairground

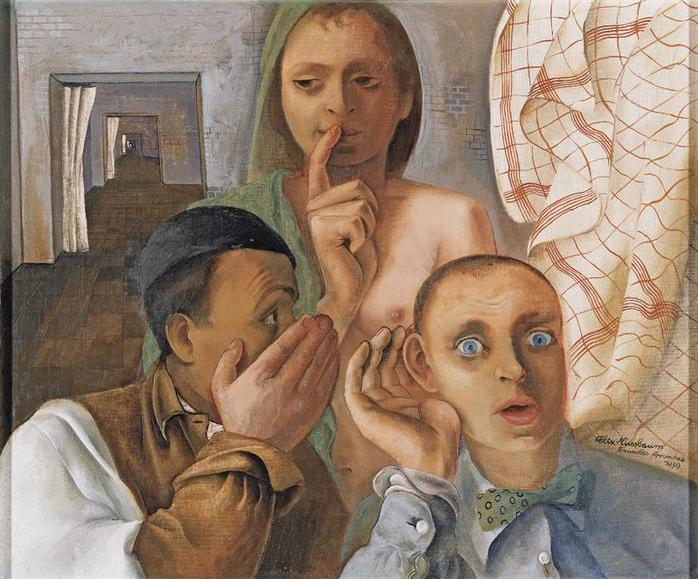
The Secret

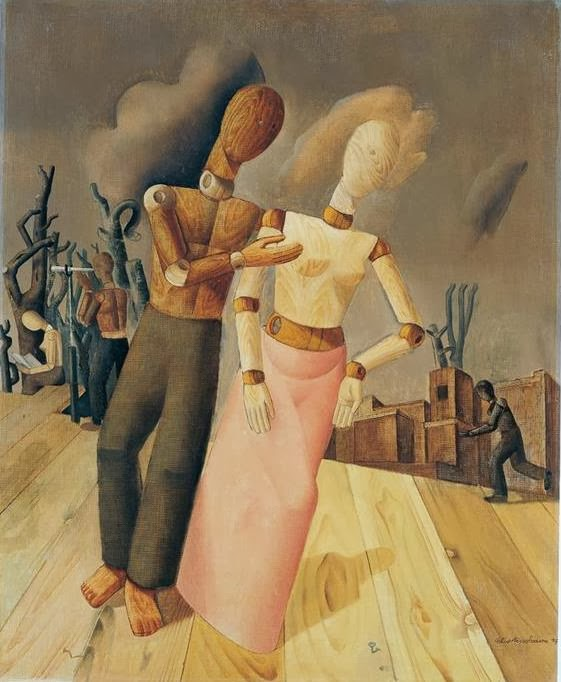
Puppets

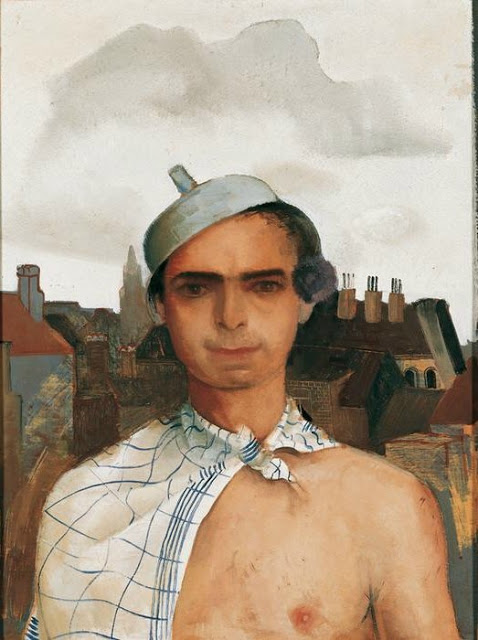
Self-portrait with Towel

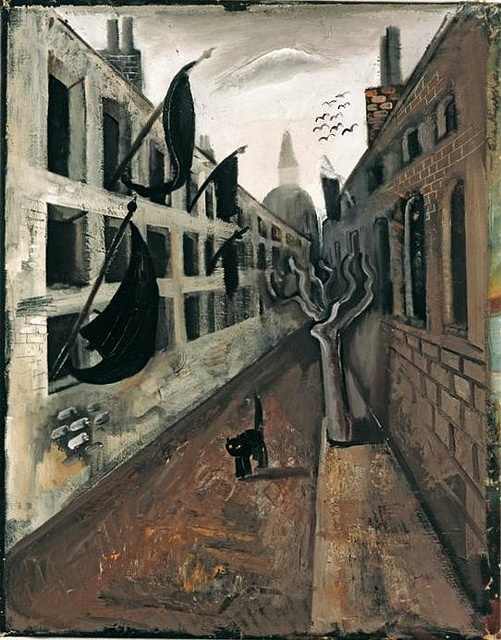
The Desolate Street

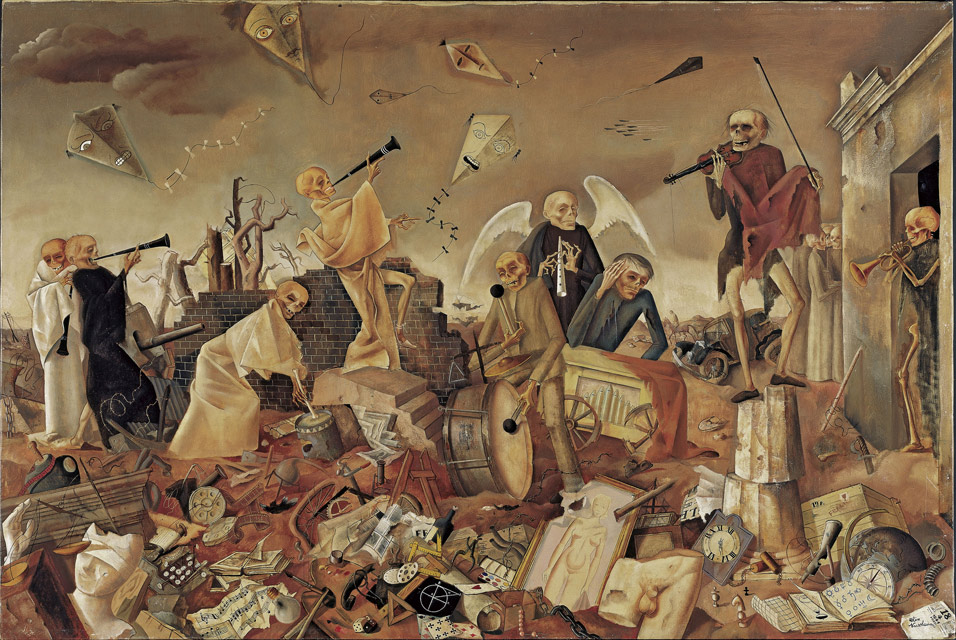
The Triumph of Death

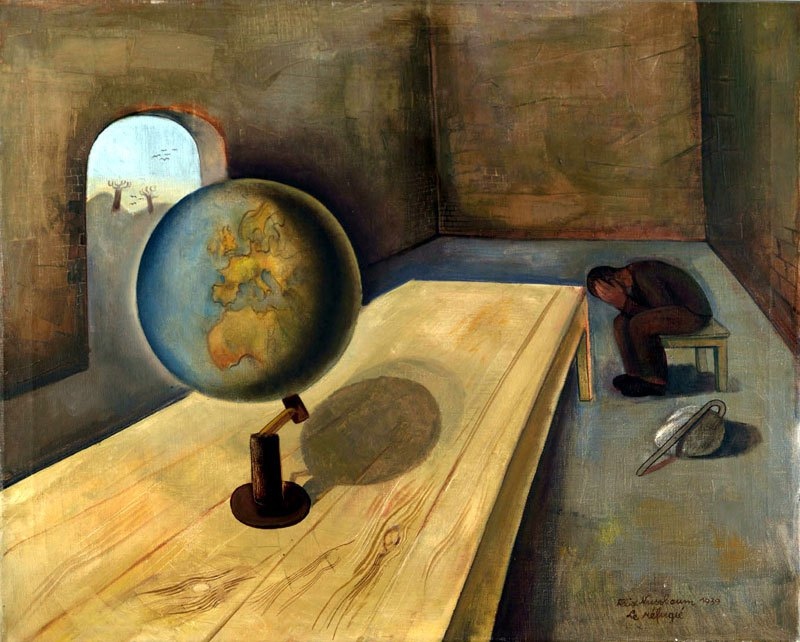
The Refugee

== Legacy ==
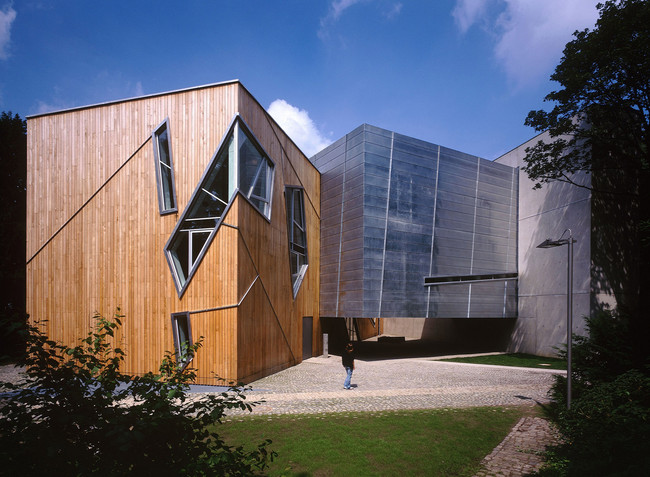
Felix Nussbaum Haus in Osnabrück

Felix Nussbaum's artwork reflects and interprets his experiences as a victim of the Holocaust. In 1998, the Felix Nussbaum Haus in Osnabrück opened to permanently exhibit his works.

He was featured alongside fellow concentration camp survivors and artists Jan Komski and Dinah Gottliebova in the 1999 documentary film Eyewitness, which was nominated for an Academy Award for Documentary Short Subject.

Art and Remembrance: The Legacy of Felix Nussbaum is a 1993 documentary directed by Barbara Pfeffer.
