= Jan Komski =

Polish painter

Jan Baraś-Komski
- Born: February 3, 1915; Bircza, Przemyśl County
- Died: July 20, 2002 (aged 87); Arlington County
- Occupation: painter

Jan Baraś-Komski (February 3, 1915, Bircza, Przemyśl County, Poland – July 20, 2002, Arlington County, Virginia, U.S.) was a Polish painter. He studied painting, anatomy, and art history at the Kraków Academy of Fine Arts.

During World War II, he worked in the resistance movement. In 1940 he fled Poland and headed toward France to join Sikorski's Army that was being formed there. However, he was arrested at the border of Czechoslovakia and imprisoned in Nowy Sącz and Tarnów before being sent to Auschwitz I in the first prisoner transport to that concentration camp. He was given prisoner number 564 under the name Jon Baraś, due to the forged identification papers he was carrying when arrested.

On December 29, 1942, he escaped Auschwitz I with three other prisoners: Mieczysław Januszewski, Bolesław Kuczbara, and Otto Küsel. Sixteen days later he was recaptured on a train heading toward Warsaw. He had used a false name in his first arrest, as the Germans would have executed him on the spot had they known he was an Auschwitz escapee.

He was sent to Montelupich Prison and from there back to Auschwitz II where he was given the prisoner number 152,884. During the last few years of World War II he was moved to Buchenwald, then to Gross-Rosen, Hersbruck and finally Dachau where he was liberated on April 29, 1945, by the United States Army.

After the war, he lived in Displaced Persons camps in Bavaria and Munich, where he married another Auschwitz survivor. They moved to the United States in 1949. In the U.S., he worked as a graphic artist with The Washington Post. Over the years, he created many drawings and paintings of life in a concentration camp.

He was featured alongside fellow concentration camp survivors and artists Dinah Gottliebova and Felix Nussbaum in the 1999 documentary film Eyewitness, which was nominated for an Academy Award for Documentary Short Subject.
