= Felka Platek =

Polish artist

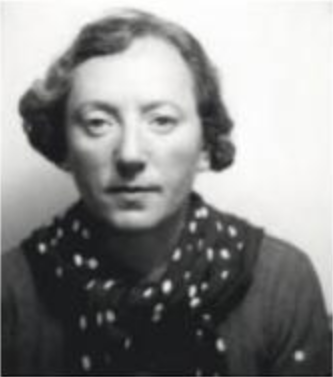
- Felka Platek, 1937
- Born: 3 November 1899; Warsaw, Poland
- Died: 2 August 1944 (aged 44); Auschwitz-Birkenau, German-occupied Poland
- Known for: Painting

Felka Platek (Felka Płatek; 3 November 1899 – 2 August 1944) was a Polish artist.

== Biography ==
Platek was born on 3 November 1899 in Warsaw, Poland. She was the companion and later the wife of the German painter Felix Nussbaum.

The couple fled Germany around 1935. They lived in Paris, then Ostend, settling in Brussels where they married in 1937. Nussbaum and Platek were arrested by the Germans in 1944. They were sent to the Auschwitz concentration camp

Platek was murdered, probably on or about 2 August 1944 at Auschwitz.

== Legacy ==
In 2014 the International Auschwitz Committee sponsored a program entitled "Find Felka! Find Felix!". The Felix Nussbaum Haus in Osnabrück includes a permanent display of Platek's work. "

== Gallery ==
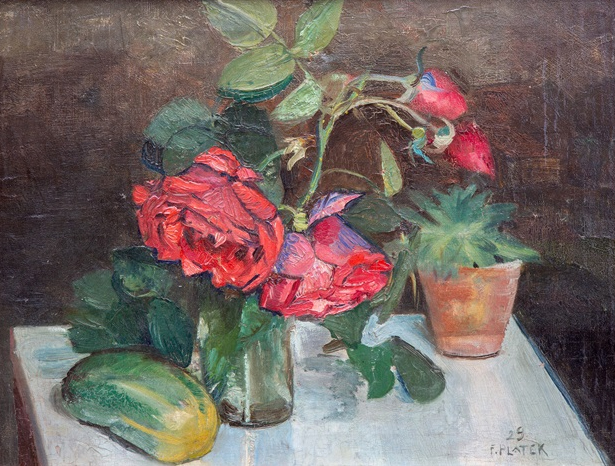
A still life with red roses in a glass vase, 1929

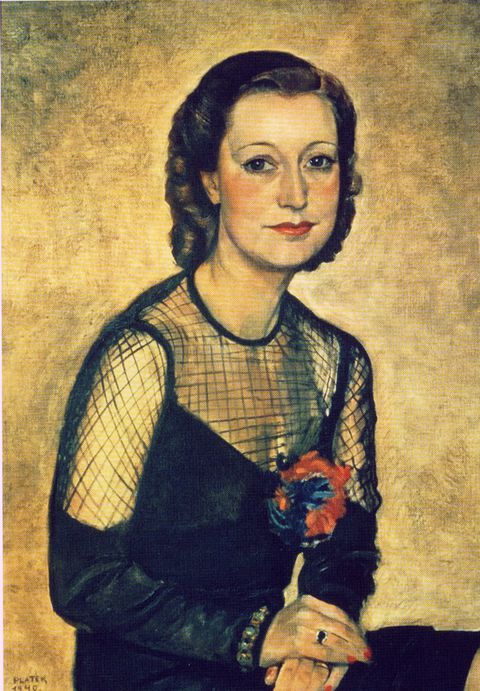
Portrait of Mrs. Etienne,1940
