= Letters to Ottla =

Collection of Franz Kafka's letters to his sister Ottla

Letters to Ottla and the Family
- First edition
- Author: Franz Kafka
- Original title: Briefe an Ottla und die Familie
- Translator: Richard and Clara Winston
- Language: German
- Genre: Letters
- Publisher: Schocken Books
- Publication date: 1974
- Publication place: United States
- English publication date: 1982
- Media type: Print, Hardcover
- Pages: 130 p.
- ISBN: 0-8052-3772-0
- OCLC: 7554590
- Dewey Decimal: 833/.912 19
- LC Class: PT2621.A26 Z53913 1982

Letters to Ottla and the Family (Briefe an Ottla und die Familie) is a book collecting Franz Kafka's letters to his sister Ottla (Ottilie Davidová, née Kafka), as well as some letters to his parents Julie and Hermann Kafka. These letters were written between 1909 and 1924; though Ottla was murdered in the Holocaust (gassed in Auschwitz on October 7, 1943), the letters were preserved by her husband and children. Originally published in German in 1974, the letters were translated into English by Richard and Clara Winston and published by Schocken Books in 1982. The English edition also includes photographs of Kafka and Ottla, as well as several images of postcards, letters, and drawings Kafka had sent his sister.
