= Dita Kraus =

Czech-Israeli Auschwitz survivor (1929–2025)

- דיטה קראוס
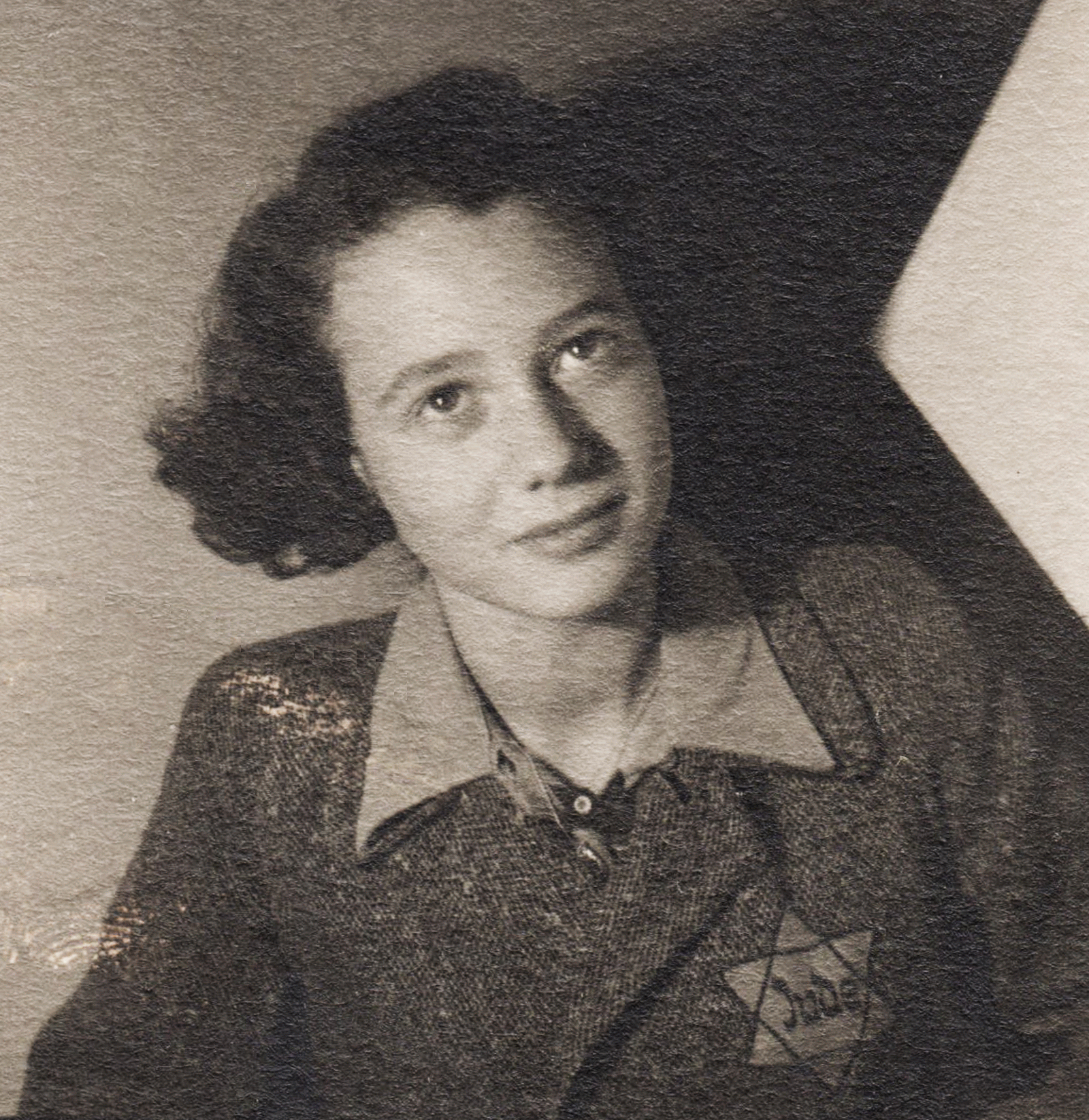
- Kraus in 1942
- Born: Edith Polachová; 12 July 1929; Prague, Czechoslovakia
- Died: 18 October 2025 (aged 96); Jerusalem, Israel
- Occupations: Librarian, teacher, writer
- Notable work: Dita Kraus: A Delayed Life
- Spouse: Ota B. Kraus
- Children: 3
- Parents: Hans Polach (father); Elisabeth Polach (mother)
- Relatives: Johann Polach (grandfather)
- Website: www.ditakraus.com

Dita Kraus (Czech: Dita Krausová; born Edith Polachová; 12 July 1929 – 18 October 2025) was a Czech-Israeli teacher, writer and Auschwitz survivor. She was known for being The Auschwitz Librarian.

== Early life ==
Dita Kraus (born Edith Polachová) was born in Prague, Czechoslovakia (now Czech Republic) on 12 July 1929. She was the only daughter of Hans Polach and Elisabeth Polach. Her father was a lawyer and her mother was a housewife. She and her parents lived in a rental apartment on U Smaltovny street in Holešovice. Due to the creation of the Protectorate of Bohemia and Moravia the family were forced to move out of their apartment.

== The Holocaust years ==
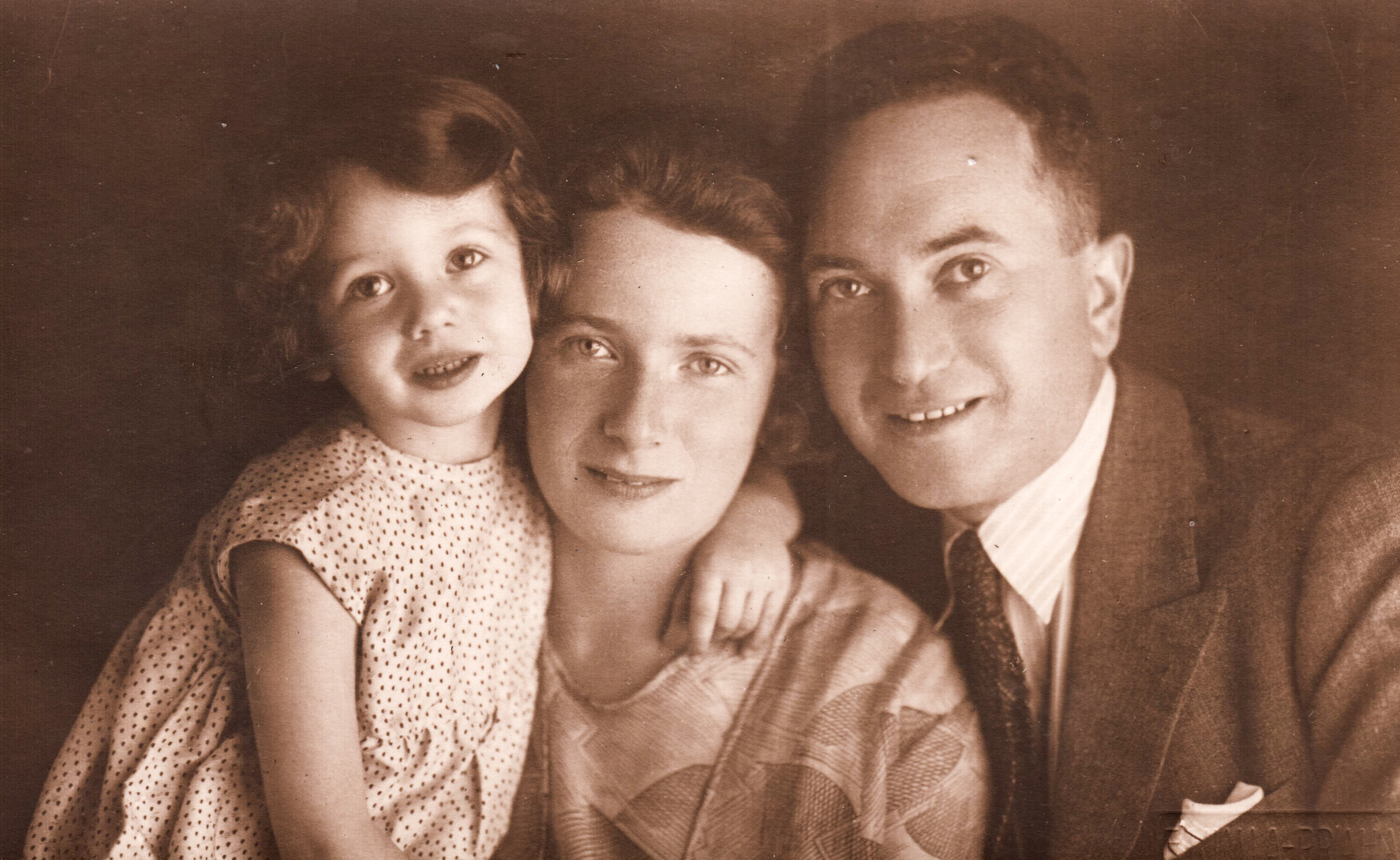
Kraus with her parents, Elisabeth and Hans Polach, in 1932

In November 1942, Kraus and her parents were sent to the Theresienstadt concentration camp. While there she met her future husband, Otto Kraus.

Dita and her parents were then transported to the East. Their final destination was to the Auschwitz-Birkenau concentration camp in December 1943. From there, Dita and her parents were immediately separated. While in Auschwitz, she and her mother were sent to the women's barracks: her father died six weeks after their arrival. Upon arrival, her mother soon fell ill and had to be put into isolation. They were placed in the Theresienstadt family camp. The camp contained a children's block which was run by a young sports instructor and Zionist called Fredy Hirsch. Dita had met Hirsch while in Prague. She had also seen him in the Terezín Ghetto where he was running a section for young people and children at the Jewish ghetto management. Dita was responsible for organizing the borrowing and hiding of books; the knowledge of the books was kept a secret.

In 1944, Dita and her mother were sent to Hamburg where they were required to participate in a work camp. From there she was moved to the concentration camp at Bergen-Belsen. Kraus's mother died soon after Bergen-Belsen was disbanded, so Dita was left to return to Prague without either of her parents.

== Post-war life ==
After Dita Kraus was liberated from Bergen-Belsen concentration camp, she returned to Prague where she met up again with Otto and they were married. They moved to Israel in 1949, where she taught English. They lived in Beit Yitzhak-Sha'ar Hefer for one year before moving to a kibbutz where Dita worked in shoe repair and in the kitchen. After seven years, they moved to Netanya. She still lived in Israel, but often visited the Czech Republic.

Kraus died in Jerusalem on 18 October 2025, at the age of 96.

== Writing ==
In 2017, Antonio Iturbe published The Librarian of Auschwitz which was based on Kraus' time at Auschwitz. Iturbe's book was based on interviews with Kraus. In 2020 Kraus published her own book, A Delayed Life, which presents her story from her own perspective.
