= Otto Küsel =

German prisoner in the Auschwitz concentration camp

Otto Küsel (born 16 May 1909 in Berlin; died 17 November 1984) is considered to be an example of a prisoner functionary in Nazi concentration camp, who used his position in favour of other prisoners.

== Detention in German concentration camps ==
Küsel was arrested because of offences against property. On 20 May 1940 he came from the Sachsenhausen concentration camp to Auschwitz I in a group of 30 criminal prisoners. His prison number was number 2.

As a prisoner functionary, he was responsible to coordinate the work of the prisoners and used his position to help them, for instance by assigning good labour details to weaker prisoners.

On the afternoon of 29 December 1942, Küsel escaped together with the Polish prisoners, Jan Baraś Komski, Mieczysław Januszewski and Bolesław Kuczbara.

Küsel was arrested in Warsaw and sent back to Auschwitz in September 1943. He was kept in isolation until November and released to the main camp in November during an amnesty related to the taking of office of the new commander Arthur Liebehenschel. On 9 November 1944 Küsel was sent to Flossenbürg.

== After the war ==
Küsel was among the 211 survivors of Auschwitz testifying in the Frankfurt Auschwitz Trials. After the war, he worked as a commercial traveller. Küsel died in Oberviechtach, Bavaria, on 17 November 1984.

== Literature ==
- Bernacka, Monika: Otto Küsel- Green Triangle. On the 100th Anniversary of his Birth: In: Oś—Oświęcim, People, History, Culture magazine, no. 5, May 2009, S. 8-9. (Digitalisat, englisch), retrieved 2010-04-29.
- Czech, Danuta, Kalendarium der Ereignisse im Konzentrationslager Auschwitz-Birkenau 1939-1945, 1. Aufl., 1989. Quoted after the Italian translation by Gianluca Picchinini (digitalized, Italian)
- Dregger, Sebastian: Die Rolle der Funktionshäftlinge im Vernichtungslager Auschwitz – und das Beispiel Otto Küsels., in: Aventinus. Die Historische Internetzeitschrift von Studenten für Studenten, Ausgabe 04 - Wintersemester 07/08
