= Transport of Białystok children =

Murder of 1,200 Jewish children by Nazi Germany

Białystok children
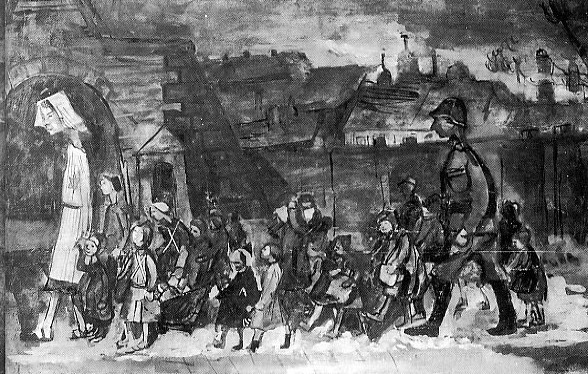
- Białystok children by Otto Ungar

- Transport of Białystok children (Poland)
- Date: 21 August–7 October 1943
- Perpetrators: Heinrich Himmler; Adolf Eichmann
- Organizations: Reich Security Main Office
- Camp: Auschwitz II-Birkenau
- Ghetto: Białystok; Theresienstadt
- Victims: About 1,200 (Note: Various figures for the number of children on the transport have been given, varying between 1,000 and 2,000. A figure of 1,260 is often repeated but is not supported by the documentation, a list of children transported to Auschwitz, which contains the names of 1,196 children and 53 Czech chaperones. Although this list was copied illegally at Theresienstadt and contains errors, Joachim Albrecht considers it more reliable than Alfréd Wetzler's claim that 1,260 children arrived at Auschwitz. According to Buchowska (2006, p. 183), the documentation suggests that 1,200 children left Białystok and 1,196 were deported to Auschwitz six weeks later, but that these figures imply an implausibly low mortality rate.) children
- Survivors: None

On 21 August 1943, during the liquidation of the Białystok Ghetto, about 1,200 Jewish children were put on trains and taken to Theresienstadt concentration camp, where they were held in isolation from other prisoners. On 5 October, they were told that they would be sent to Switzerland in exchange for German prisoners of war. Instead, the train went to Auschwitz concentration camp where all were murdered in gas chambers. The reason for the unusual route of the transport is still debated by scholars; it is believed to be connected to Nazi–Jewish negotiations ongoing at the time and the intervention of Mohammad Amin al-Husseini, who feared that the children would settle in Palestine.

== Background ==
=== Białystok Ghetto ===
The Białystok Ghetto was established in 1941, following the murder of 7,000 Jews from Białystok and surrounding areas by Einsatzgruppe B, Police Battalion 309, and Police Battalion 316. In February 1943, 8,000 Jews were deported from the ghetto to Treblinka extermination camp and another 2,000 were executed in the ghetto. On 16 August 1943, the final liquidation of the ghetto began. Although some Jews revolted, Police Regiment 26 (largely composed of Ukrainian collaborators) and other German forces crushed the uprising. Between 17 and 23 August, more than 25,000 Jews were deported to Treblinka and Auschwitz-Birkenau.

=== Negotiations ===
It is still unclear how the Białystok children fit into the larger scheme of Nazi-Jewish negotiations ongoing at the time. The Bratislava Working Group, an underground Jewish organization in Axis-aligned Slovakia, was at the time negotiating indirectly with Heinrich Himmler in hopes of ransoming the lives of all European Jews. In early 1943, Swiss diplomat Anton Feldscher forwarded a British proposal to the German Foreign Office to allow 5,000 Jewish children to escape from the General Government to Palestine via Sweden. Working Group member Andrej Steiner testified after the war that Dieter Wisliceny, the Working Group's liaison to the SS hierarchy, had told him in 1943 that the Grand Mufti of Jerusalem, Mohammad Amin al-Husseini, had intervened to prevent the rescue of the children, since he did not want them to go to Palestine. (Note: Steiner said that the Working Group had made specific requests for money from the Jewish Agency to bribe the SS for this rescue attempt, but there is no record of such a request having been made.) Wisliceny appeared as a witness for the prosecution at the Nuremberg Trials. He claimed that his superiors, Adolf Eichmann and Himmler, were in favor of exchanging Polish Jewish children for prisoners of war. For this purpose, 10,000 children were to be transferred to Theresienstadt. However, due to the objections of the Mufti, the plan had to be abandoned. Eichmann stated at his 1961 trial that when Himmler canceled the operation, he forbade any consideration of plans to resettle Jews in Palestine.

The intervention of the Mufti is considered by historians Sara Bender and Tobiasz Cyton to be the decisive factor leading to the murder of the children. According to Israeli historian Yehuda Bauer, it is most likely that both the Białystok children and the establishment of the Theresienstadt family camp were connected to the Feldscher proposal; in both cases the victims were temporarily kept alive in case they could be exchanged later, but murdered when the ransom failed to materialize. Bauer also states that Himmler's motivation to engage in negotiations was related to his belief that a Jewish conspiracy controlled the Allied governments; using Jewish children, he hoped to manipulate Allied leaders to his own advantage as it became clear that Germany would lose the war.

== The transport ==
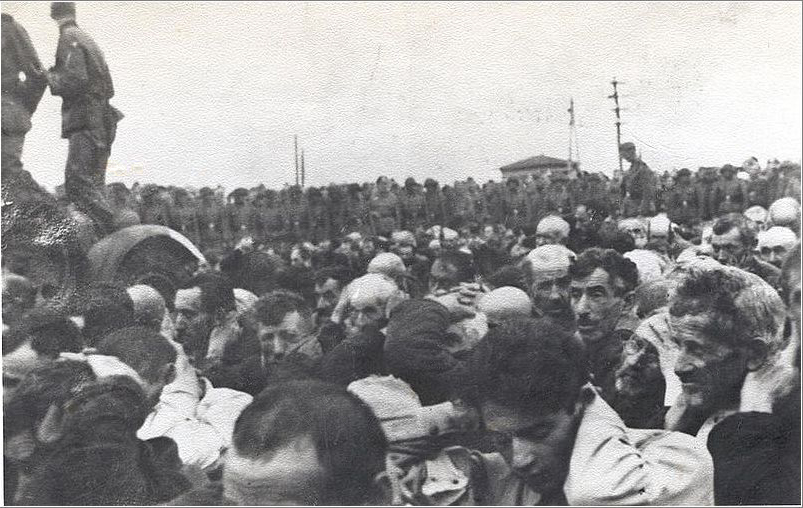
Liquidation of the Białystok Ghetto

On 17 August, the first day of the deportations, about 2,000 children were gathered near the train station waiting to be deported. The Germans separated them from their parents and housed them, along with 400 children from two Jewish orphanages in Białystok, during the chaotic liquidation of the ghetto. Rumors circulated that the children would be exchanged for German prisoners of war and sent to safety in Switzerland. Some parents gave up their children voluntarily, hoping to save their lives. Other families were separated by force; survivors testified that Ukrainian auxiliaries murdered some children who tried to run back to their parents. Held in a former gymnasium, the children were treated well on the orders of Fritz Gustav, head of the Białystok Gestapo, who stated "These children are mine!" However, German troops accidentally shelled the building on 18 August, killing a few dozen children. On 20 August, some 1,200 children between four and fourteen and a few dozen (Note: Sara Bender alternately gave the figure of 30 and 60 adults. Albrecht (2013, p. 1) states that there were 60. Buchowska (2006, pp. 185–186) mentions testimony from surviving Polish witnesses indicating 20 or 40 caregivers. The identity of most is unknown.) adult chaperones were marched separately to the Umschlagplatz, where they were given only a small amount of dried bread and no water, despite the heat.

Probably on 21 August, (Note: According to Sara Bender, the departure and arrival dates may have been one day later (22 and 25 August).) the children and caregivers boarded a special train that arrived at Theresienstadt Ghetto three days later. It is unclear whether the train was composed of freight cars, as was typically the case during the Holocaust, or passenger cars. The conditions on the train were relatively good and after a while the children began to forget the horrors of the Białystok Ghetto, although some of the older children asked the chaperones if they should jump from the trains. According to Helena Wolkenberg, a surviving chaperone, she told the children that they should only jump if the train went northwards, but it went west. It is not known whether the route taken was Białystok–Auschwitz–Theresienstadt–Auschwitz or Białystok–Theresienstadt–Auschwitz. If the former, it is possible that the youngest children were taken off the train and gassed at Auschwitz. (Note: In this case, more than 1,200 children were originally on the train.) According to Israeli historian Bronka Klibanski, the train halted at Auschwitz before its arrival at Theresienstadt, where 20 children and 3 female caregivers who held valid Palestinian visas were removed from the train and murdered in the gas chambers. On 24 August 1943, the transport arrived at Theresienstadt and the chaperones were separated from the children, except for one young woman who was disguised as a child, and put on a different train. The chaperones continued to Auschwitz, where about twenty (Note: Testimonies disagree on whether twenty adults were selected to live, or seventeen women and four men (a total of twenty-one).) were selected for forced labor and the rest gassed.

== Theresienstadt Ghetto ==
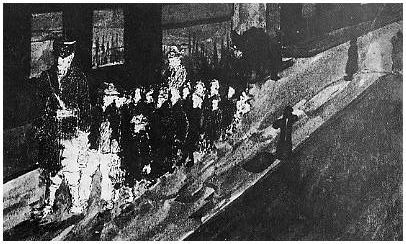
March of the Białystok children by Pavel Fantl

At Theresienstadt, the children were kept inside the trains for some time. Some prisoners of the camp were ordered to bring the children food but were forbidden to speak to them. Despite the fact that Theresienstadt was a concentration camp where more than 30,000 people died, the residents were shocked by the poor condition of the children, starving and dressed in ragged clothes; many were shoeless. Because the Germans wanted to prevent the Theresienstadt prisoners from learning about Treblinka and other extermination camps, they forbade the Theresienstadt prisoners from going outside or even looking out of windows while the children were marched to the disinfection building by a large group of SS men. The precautions taken mystified Theresienstadt prisoners, since no other transport had been segregated nor been composed exclusively of children. Theresienstadt prisoners drew at least five images depicting the children marching through the streets.

Upon reaching the disinfection rooms, some children panicked when their hair was cut and they were asked to undress, believing that they were about to be gassed; they were said to have shouted "Gas! Gas! Gas!" Older children tried to shield younger ones and they refused to undress and wash despite their poor clothing and lice. Although forbidden to speak with the children, the disinfection personnel were able to surreptitiously reassure them that there were no gas chambers at Theresienstadt, and the children calmed down when they noticed that water came out of the showers. Despite the language barrier—most of the children spoke Polish or Yiddish—they told the Theresienstadt prisoners about mass shootings in Białystok and the use of gas chambers for mass murder. The incident, although not well understood by the other residents of Theresienstadt, was one of the few clues to the ultimate fate of those deported from the camp.

The children were housed in the western barracks, separated from the rest of the camp by a barbed-wire fence. Czech gendarmes guarded the perimeter and kept the children strictly segregated from the rest of the camp. Attempting to find out more about the rumors of gas chambers, Fredy Hirsch, a community leader at Theresienstadt, jumped over the fence to speak with the Białystok children but was caught. As punishment, he was deported to Auschwitz in September. The children were not registered into the records of the camp. The Białystok children were held in relatively good conditions and given extra food by the Germans. It was rumored that they were to be taken to Switzerland to be exchanged for German prisoners of war, although some suspected that it was a trick. Fifty-three Czech volunteers, mostly doctors and nurses, were allowed to cross the barrier to attend to them. The volunteers, among them Ottla Kafka, were isolated with the Białystok children and not allowed any contact with the Theresienstadt prisoners. Some sick children may have been murdered at the Theresienstadt Small Fortress or in an infirmary.

On 5 October, 1,196 children and the 53 chaperones were put on a train and told that they were to be sent to Switzerland. They were told to remove the Star of David that Jews were forced to wear and forced to sign pledges that they would not spread information about Nazi atrocities. The train arrived at Auschwitz two days later; everyone was gassed immediately.

== Legacy ==
The transport has been cited as an example of the Mufti's culpability in the Holocaust, despite the fact that his role in the events remains unclear. In 2014, the story of the Białystok children was commemorated by a German play, Sie hatten so verängstigte Augen ("They had such fear in their eyes") directed by Markus Schuliers.
