= Ottla Kafka =

Sister of Franz Kafka (1892 – 1943)

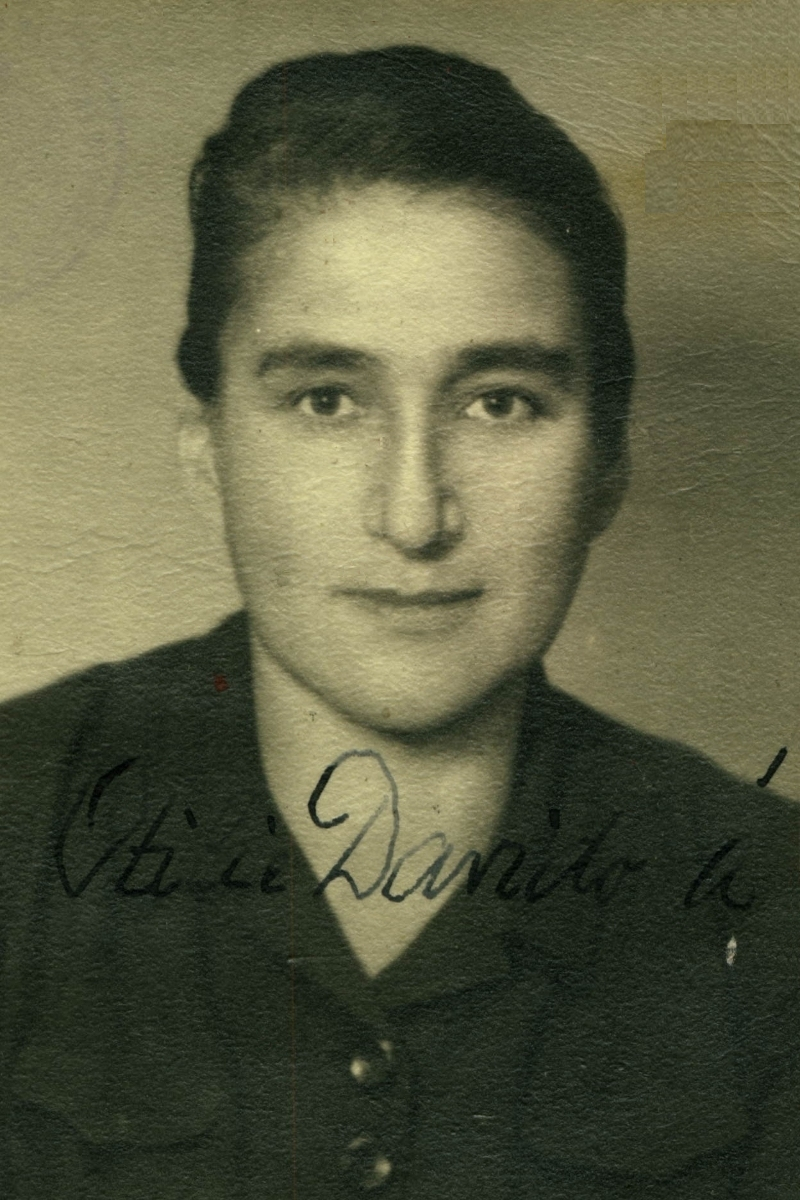
Ottila "Ottla" Davidová, née Kafka (1941)

Ottilie "Ottla" Kafka (29 October 1892 – 7 October 1943) was the youngest sister of Franz Kafka. His favourite sister, she was probably also the relative closest to him and supported him in difficult times. Their correspondence was published as Letters to Ottla. She was murdered in the Holocaust.

== Life ==
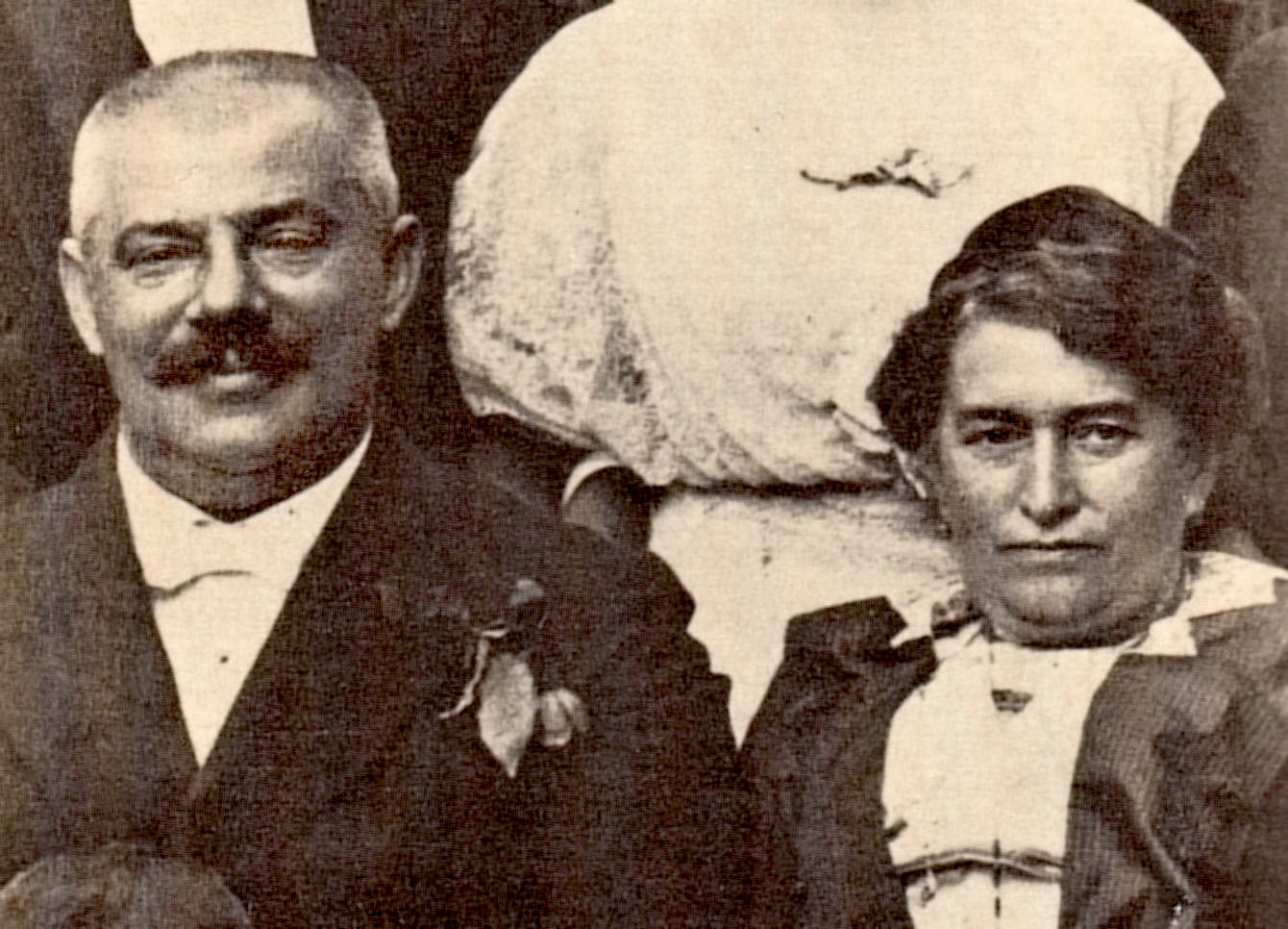
Hermann and Julie Kafka

Ottilie, called Ottla by her family, was born in Prague, then part of the Austro-Hungarian Empire, into a middle-class Ashkenazi Jewish family. Her father was the businessman Hermann Kafka (1852–1931), her mother, Julie (1856–1934), was the daughter of Jakob Löwy, a brewer in Poděbrady. She had three siblings, Franz, Gabriele ("Elli") (1889–1942) and Valerie ("Valli") (1890–1942). She was Franz's favourite sister. She was a close confidant (enge Vertraute), and he called her unbeschadet der Liebe zu den anderen, die bei weitem liebste (the love to the others notwithstanding, the dearest by far). He helped her get an education at an agricultural school. She lived and worked at the agricultural estate of her brother-in-law, Karl Hermann, in West Bohemian Zürau (now Siřem, community Blšany). In 1916–17, she provided her brother with a writing refuge where he was able to write many short stories, and he also lived on Hermann's estate from September 1917 to April 1918, already suffering from tuberculosis. During this time he wrote Die Zürauer Aphorismen (The Zürau Aphorisms).

In July 1920, Ottla married the Czech Catholic Joseph David, against her father's will. Their daughters Věra (nicknamed Valli) and Helene (nicknamed Elli) were born in 1921 and 1923. Franz Kafka watched them grow up until he died in June 1924. The marriage was not happy and they were divorced in August 1942. Ottla thus lost her protection against the persecution of Jews.

Like many other Jews from Prague, Ottla and her sisters were deported during World War II by the Nazis. Elli and Valli were sent with their families to the Łódź Ghetto, and then to Chelmno where they were murdered. Ottla was sent to the concentration camp at Theresienstadt. On 5 October 1943, Ottla accompanied a group of children as a voluntary assistant. When the transport reached Auschwitz concentration camp two days later, all were murdered in the gas chambers.

== Legacy ==
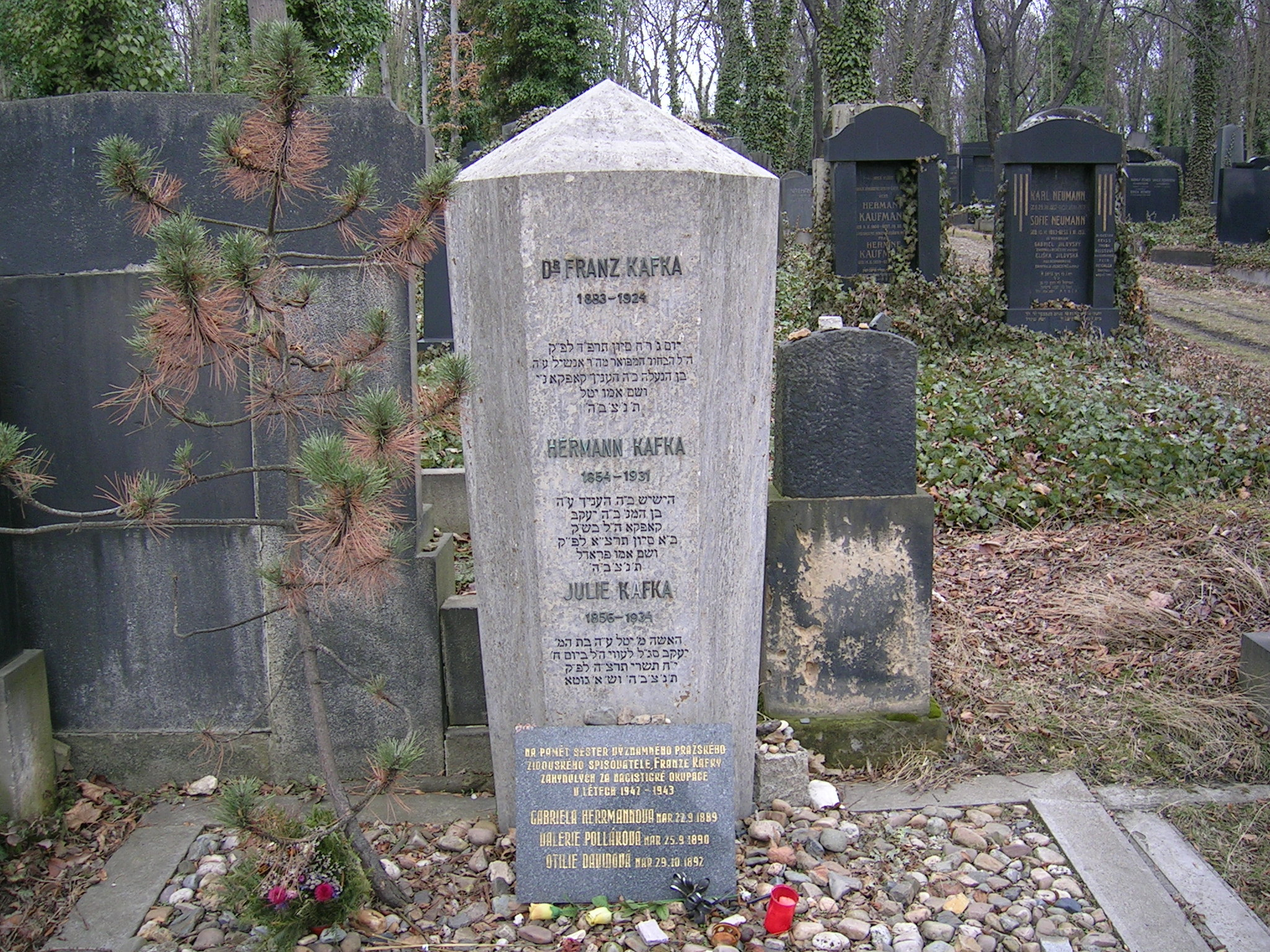
Family grave of Franz Kafka and his parents at the New Jewish Cemetery in Prague. A separate commemorative plaque lists the names of his three younger sisters, "Elli", "Valli", and "Ottla", with unknown dates of death, who were murdered between 1942 and 1943 in the Kulmhof extermination camp and Auschwitz-Birkenau, respectively.

The correspondence between Franz and Ottla Kafka is preserved. It was first published in 1974 by Hartmut Binder and Klaus Wagenbach, and published in English as Letters to Ottla & the Family. In January 2011 it was announced that the original letters were to be sold as a bundle at a Berlin auction house. The German Literature Archive in Marbach hoped to be able to obtain it with help from the private sector; in April 2011 they and the Bodleian Library in Oxford acquired it. They thanked Ottla's heirs for their willingness to sell before the auction, and those who assisted in making it possible to raise the needed funds, including one generous donor who remained anonymous at his own request.
