= Bert Van Bork =

- Born: 1928; Augustusburg, Germany
- Died: October 29, 2014 (aged 85–86)
- Citizenship: German, American
- Occupations: Filmmaker, artist
- Organization(s): American Filmmaker Association, Encyclopedia Britannica Films
- Awards: National Award for Outstanding Photography 1954
- Website: www.vanbork.com

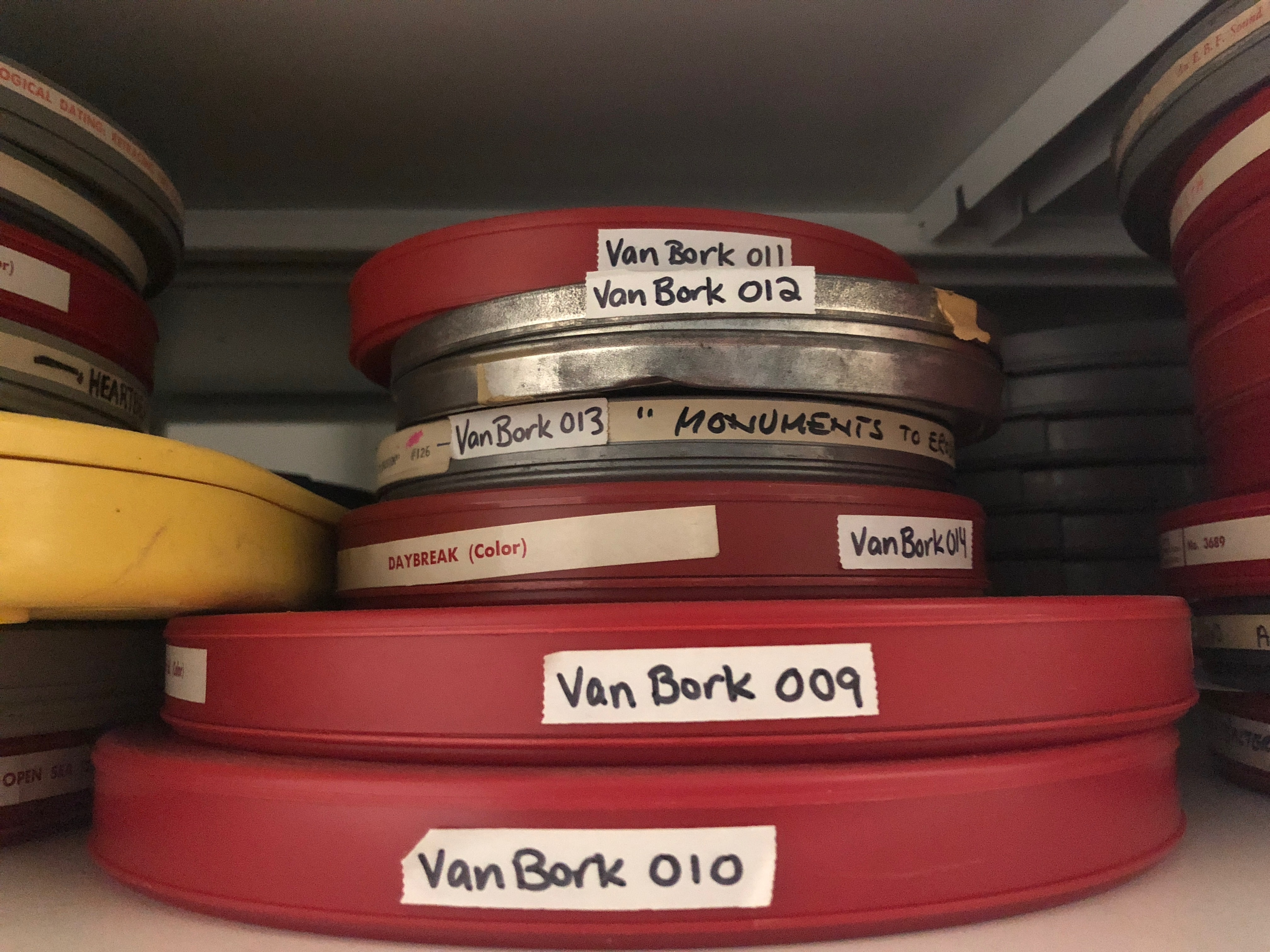
16 mm films by Bert Van Bork archived at the Chicago Film Archive

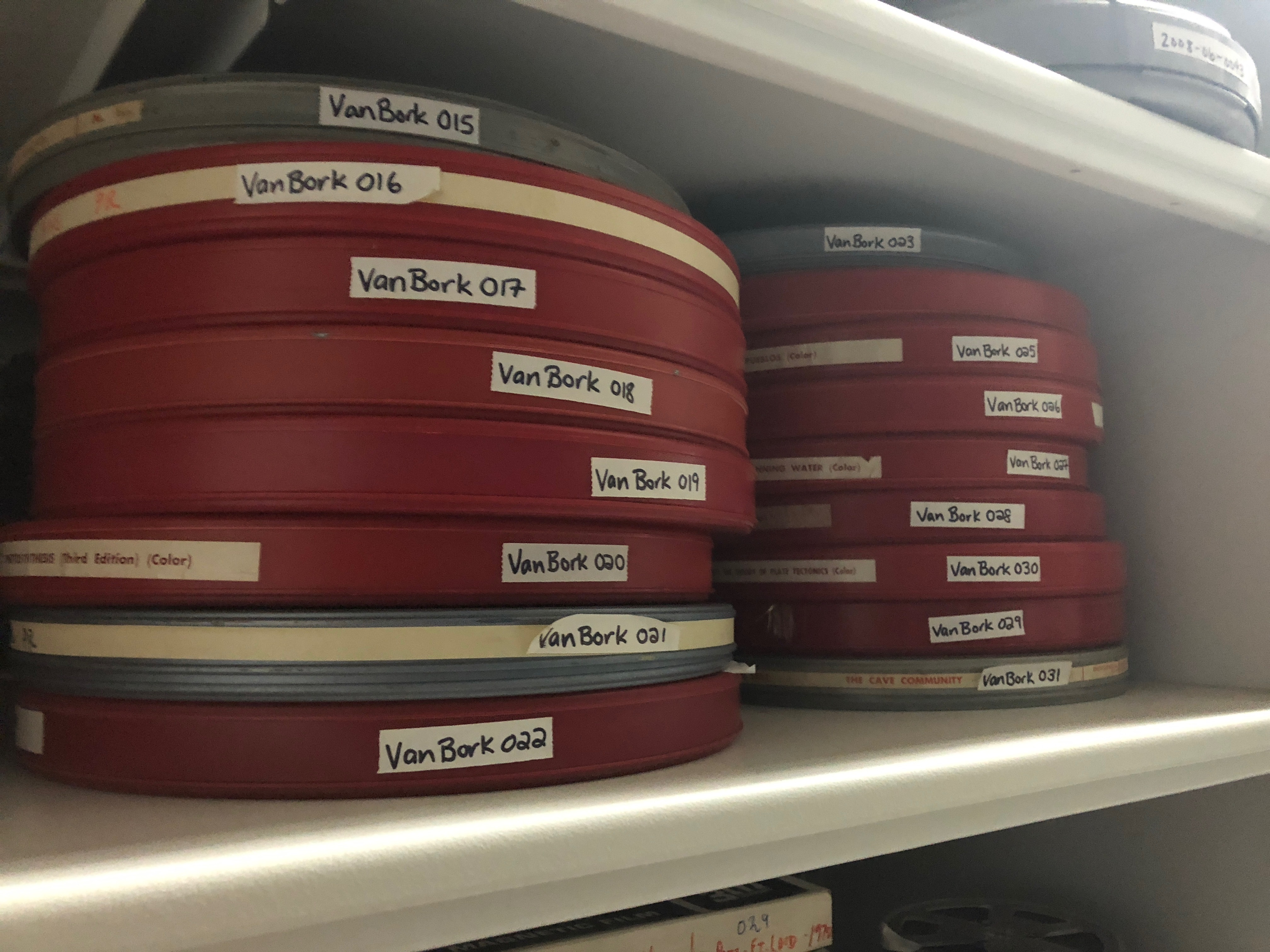
16 mm films by Bert Van Bork archived at the Chicago Film Archive

Bert Van Bork (1928–October 29, 2014) was a German-born producer, director, cinematographer, still photographer, painter, and printer. He studied fine arts in Berlin, Leipzig, Dresden, and later moved to Chicago, where he shot and directed instructional films for companies such as Encyclopædia Britannica Films and Physical Science Study Committee.

== Early life ==
Van Bork was born in Augustusburg, Saxony, Germany. At fifteen, Bert won a competition to study at the Staatliche Hochschule für Bildende Künste in Berlin. There Van Bork attended classes taught by Karl Schmidt-Rottluff, one of the four founders of the German Expressionist art group Die Brücke.

Following World War II Van Bork continued his studies at Hochschule für Grafik und Buchkunst in Leipzig as well as Dresden. During this time he produced the critically acclaimed woodcut series Night Over Germany, a personal documentation of the German post-war experience.

== Career ==
In 1954 Van Bork emigrated to the United States, settling in Chicago with his wife whom he had met in Leipzig. Bert continued to reflect his German Expressionism roots. This showed in his depictions of landscapes of the American Southwest and the Chicago skyline. In this time he became known for his work in photography.

His career as a filmmaker began in 1957 when he presented his documentary film about the life cycle of cicadas, The Seventeen Year Locust to Warren Everote at EB Films. He was hired by Encyclopædia Britannica Films to produce art and science instructional films and worked for the Physical Science Study Committee.

In 1966 Van Bork paid homage to his roots in German expressionism, exhibiting at The Renaissance Society at the University of Chicago in 1966.

A filmography was compiled of films Van Bork remembered making before his passing in 2014.

== Recognition ==
- National Award for Outstanding Photography in Germany in 1954.
