= Ota Kraus =

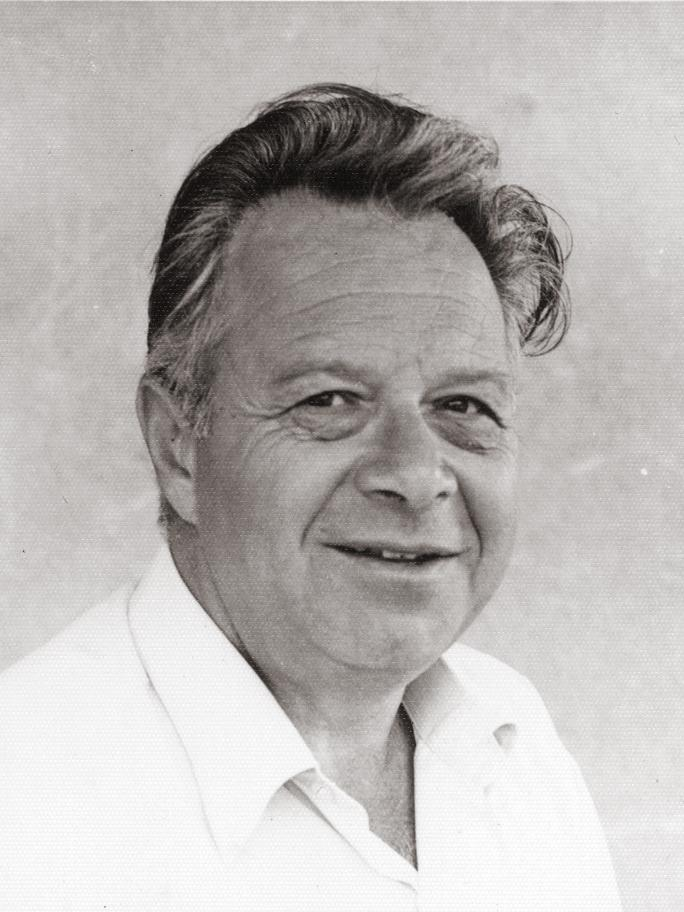
Ota Kraus

Ota B. Kraus (born Otto B. Kraus; 1 September 1921 – 5 October 2000) was a Czech Jewish teacher and writer who survived the Auschwitz concentration camp.

== Biography ==
Kraus was born on 1 September 1921 in Prague, then the capital of Czechoslovakia (now the Czech Republic). He was the eldest of eight children of Richard Kraus and Marie Strass, and grew up in the prosperity of his parents' textile business. During the Nazi German occupation, Otto was an active Zionist, preparing to go to Eretz Israel.

Ota and his family were first transferred to the Theresienstadt concentration camp in 1942 and then deported to Auschwitz in December 1943, where he was appointed as a counselor in the Kinderblock (barracks where the children were kept). Selected by Mengele, he was sent to the Schwarzheide camp in Germany.

He married Dita Kraus in 1947, whom he met in Auschwitz and with whom he had three children.

He died on 5 October 2000 in Netanya, Israel.
