= Dina Babbitt =

Czech-American painter

- Dina Babbitt with a copy of one of the portraits she painted in Auschwitz
- Born: Annemarie Dina Gottliebová; January 21, 1923; Brno, Czechoslovakia
- Died: July 29, 2009 (aged 86); Felton, California, U.S.
- Occupation: Artist
- Spouse: Art Babbitt (m. 1949; div. 1963)
- Children: 2

Annemarie Dina Babbitt (née Gottliebová; January 21, 1923 – July 29, 2009) was an artist and Holocaust survivor. A naturalized U.S. citizen, she resided in Santa Cruz, California.

She was imprisoned at Auschwitz concentration camp during World War II, where she drew portraits of Romani inmates for the infamous Josef Mengele. Following the liberation of the camp and the end of the war, she emigrated to the United States and became an animator. At the time of her death, she had been fighting the Auschwitz-Birkenau State Museum for the return of her paintings.

Babbitt was featured alongside fellow concentration camp survivors and artists Jan Komski and Felix Nussbaum in the 1999 documentary film Eyewitness, which was nominated for an Academy Award for Documentary Short Subject.

== Early life and war ==
Annemarie Dina Gottliebová was born in Brno, Czechoslovakia (today the Czech Republic), to a Jewish family. In 1939, when the Germans invaded her homeland, she began to study at the School of Arts and Crafts in Brno, but was expelled in 1940 due to her Jewish ethnicity and could only attend the school as a guest. In 1942, she and her mother, Johanna Gottlieb, were arrested and sent to the Theresienstadt concentration camp, outside Prague. The following year, they were transferred to Auschwitz.

== Auschwitz paintings ==
In 1944, while in Auschwitz, the 21-year-old Gottliebová was chosen by Mengele to draw portraits of Romani inmates. Mengele wished to capture the Romanis' skin coloration better than he could with camera and film at that time. Gottliebová agreed, on the condition that her mother's life be spared as well.

As of 2009, seven watercolors survive, all in the Auschwitz-Birkenau State Museum. According to the museum's website, seven of her portraits of Romani inmates were discovered after World War II outside the Auschwitz camp in the early 1970s and sold to the museum by people who apparently did not know that Gottliebova was still alive and living in California as Dina Babbitt. The museum asked Babbitt to return to the Auschwitz site in 1973 to identify her work. After she did so, she was informed that the museum would not allow her to take her paintings home. Gottliebová-Babbitt formally requested the return of her paintings, but the museum rejected her claims.

The U.S. government became involved with House and Senate resolutions. The House version was authored by Representative Shelley Berkley. The Senate version was co-authored by Senators Barbara Boxer and Jesse Helms. Both became part of the Congressional Record in 2003 and passed unanimously.

In collaboration with Rafael Medoff, director of the David S. Wyman Institute for Holocaust Studies, Neal Adams of the comic-book industry championed Babbitt's efforts. Using text from Medoff, Adams illustrated a six-page graphic documentary about Babbitt that was inked by Joe Kubert and contains an introduction by Stan Lee. Adams called the Babbitt situation "tragic" and "an atrocity".

In 2008, Adams, the Wyman Institute and Vanguard Publications publisher J. David Spurlock spearheaded a petition campaign in which over 450 comic book creators and cartoonists urged the Auschwitz-Birkenau museum to return Babbitt's seven portraits. A reprint of the graphic documentary and an account of Babbitt's plight were included in the final issue of the comic X-Men: Magneto Testament.

A group of students from Palo Alto High School, led by teacher David Rapaport, worked to help Babbitt by communicating with officials from the State Department to have the paintings returned, and by writing to individuals in the government. They have written a book about this experience.

In 2011, Lidia Ostałowska, a Polish writer and journalist, wrote a reportage about life of Dina Babbitt (Watercolors: A Story from Auschwitz) including the story of paintings, description of the Romani people and Sinti extermination, discussion of rights of the Romani people and Sinti to these paintings, and also the influence of the above mentioned action of American artists on the aggressive letters and emails addressed to the Auschwitz-Birkenau State Museum (ca 1,500 aggressive letters a year). The reportage has been translated into English in 2016 and published in the New Delhi, India.

== Personal life ==
She was the second wife of animator Art Babbitt, co-creator of the Disney character Goofy. The couple had two daughters, Michele Kane and Karin Babbitt, and three grandchildren, all of whom have been active in pursuing Gottliebová-Babbitt's claims. The Babbitts divorced in 1963.

Dina Gottliebová-Babbitt was diagnosed with an aggressive form of abdominal cancer and had surgery on July 23, 2008. She died one year later, on July 29, 2009, aged 86, in Felton, California.

== See also ==
- Marianne Grant
