= Felix Nussbaum Haus =

Art museum in Osnabrück, Germany

Coordinates: 52°16′32″N 8°2′20″E

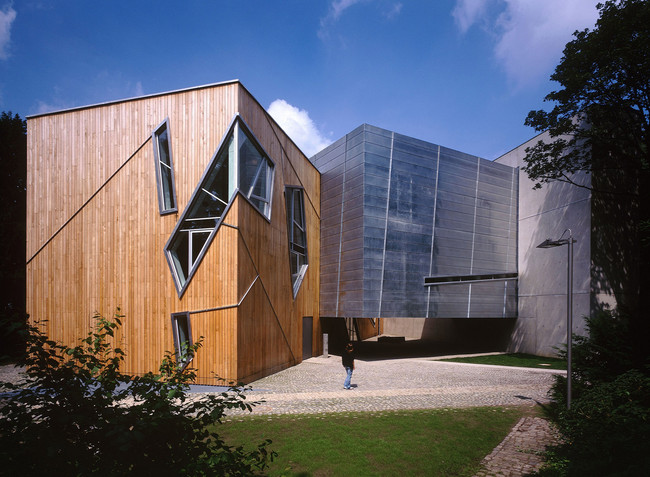
The Felix Nussbaum Haus

Felix Nussbaum Haus, Osnabrück

The Felix Nussbaum Haus is a museum in Osnabrück, Germany, which houses the paintings of German-Jewish painter Felix Nussbaum. The building also houses an exhibition space, which focuses on racism and intolerance.

== Origins ==
By the 1980s, the city of Osnabrück, Germany, had begun to embrace Nussbaum as a native son. An exhibition of his major works was organized at the Jewish Museum in New York in 1985. Soon after, the city's Museum of Cultural History set aside two rooms for a permanent exhibition. In 1991, Osnabrück decided to dedicate a museum to one of its natives, Felix Nussbaum, a Jewish painter murdered in the Holocaust. In 1996, Daniel Libeskind's proposal, titled "Museum Without Exit," won the competition to design the building, which was completed in 1998. The new museum was inaugurated by Gerhard Schröder, then prime minister of Lower Saxony and later Chancellor of Germany. The museum was Libeskind's first completed project.

== Design ==
The museum consists of three intersecting "volumes." The oak volume houses Nussbaum's prewar art. The second volume, which slices violently through the first, is made from concrete and contains the paintings Nussbaum made while in hiding from the Nazis. Dubbed "Nussbaum Gang," it evokes the cramped quarters in Brussels where Nussbaum painted his last canvasses. The metal volume displays the artist's newly discovered paintings. The interior is labyrinthine and many paths lead to dead ends. The museum's sides face three cities where Nussbaum studied art: Berlin, Rome, and Hamburg. The fourth side faces the concentration camp where he was killed. The galleries house approximately 160 of Nussbaum's paintings.

== Reaction ==
According to The Times, the museum, whose "narrow tunnel and subdued lighting impose an atmosphere of oppression,""clearly uses the idiom of displacement, loss and incomprehension." Jonathan Glancey, in The Guardian, calls it "a masterpiece...in architectural dialogue with the paintings hung on its walls." Detractors, however, have said that Nussbaum's work is powerful enough on its own that it would have benefitted from being exhibited in a more neutral space.
