= Germans in Czechoslovakia (1918–1938) =

Ethnic minority in Czechoslovakia from 1918 to 1938

The German-speaking population in the interwar Czechoslovak Republic, 23.6% of the population at the 1921 census, usually refers to the Sudeten Germans, although there were other German ethno-linguistic enclaves elsewhere in Czechoslovakia (e.g. Hauerland or Zips) inhabited by Carpathian Germans (including Zipser Germans or Zipser Saxons), and among the German-speaking urban dwellers there were ethnic Germans and/or Austrians as well as German-speaking Jews. 14% of the Czechoslovak Jews considered themselves Germans in the 1921 census, but a much higher percentage declared German as their colloquial tongue during the last censuses under the Austro-Hungarian Empire.

== Carpathian Germans and Sudeten Germans ==
The terms Carpathian Germans and Sudeten Germans are relatively recent and were not traditionally used in the past. The former was coined by historian and ethnologue Raimund Friedrich Kaindl in the early 20th century. The latter was coined in 1904 by journalist and politician Franz Jesser and was used mostly after 1919.

== Historical settlements ==
There were several subregions and towns with German-speaking absolute or relative majorities in the interwar Czechoslovak Republic.

Linguistic map of Czechoslovakia (1930) German-speaking majority in purple (popularly referred to as the Sudetenland)

Table. 1921 ethnonational census

Regions	German-speaking population	%	Total population
Bohemia	2 173 239	32.6%	6 668 518
Moravia	547 604	20.7%	2 649 323
Silesia	252 365	41.9%	602 202
Slovakia	139 900	4.7%	2 989 361
Carpathian Ruthenia	10 460	1.8%	592 044
Czechoslovak Republic	3 123 568	23.3%	13 410 750

In Bohemia and Moravia (present-day Czech Republic), there were German Bohemians (Deutschböhmen, Čeští Němci) and German Moravians (Deutschmährer, Moravští Němci), as well as German Silesians, in e.g. the Hlučín Region (part of Czech Silesia but formerly part of the Austrian Silesia Province before Seven Years' War in 1756).

In Slovakia there were two German-speaking enclaves in Hauerland and Spiš. In the Austro-Hungarian Szepes County (Spiš), there were according to censuses 35% Germans in 1869, 25% in 1900 and 1910. There was also a relative German-language majority in the border city of Pressburg/Bratislava: 59.9% at the 1890 census, 41.9% in 1910, 36% in 1919, 28.1 in 1930, 20% in 1940.

There were also two linguistic enclaves in Subcarpathian Ruthenia (present-day Ukraine).

== German-speaking urban Jews ==
Table. Declared Nationality of Jews in Czechoslovakia

Ethnonationality	1921,%	1930,%
Jewish	53.62	57.20
Czechoslovak	21.84	24.52
German	14.26	12.28
Hungarian	8.45	4.71
Others	1.83	1.29

In addition, there was a sizeable German-speaking urban Jewish minority, for instance the writers Franz Kafka, Max Brod and Felix Weltsch, and Jewish politicians were elected as deputies, and even as leaders of German minority parties such as Ludwig Czech and Siegfried Taub in the German Social Democratic Workers Party in the Czechoslovak Republic or Bruno Kafka (second cousin of Franz Kafka) in the German Democratic Freedom Party.

In Moravia and Silesia, like in Bohemia, Jews (ethnic and of faith) mainly resided in towns, but unlike in Bohemia they did not live primarily in large towns. Historically the degree of assimilation into the Czech language environment and culture and the effort to advance this process were significantly different. During the Austro-Hungarian Monarchy 82–90% of Jews declared German as they [sic] colloquial tongue, but during the First Republic a dramatic change occurred, as 47.8% claimed Jewish ethnicity in 1921 and 51.67% in 1930. This fundamental shift in orientation was understandably accompanied by a decline in the share of Jews who identified themselves as ethnic Germans (to around 34–29%)

== German-language education in Czechoslovakia ==
=== Bohemia ===
- German University in Prague (Karl-Ferdinands-Universität), first bilingual, from 1882 to 1945 two separate universities, a German-language and a Czech-language one
- German Polytechnic University in Prague, first bilingual, from 1869 to 1945 two separate institutes, a German-language and a Czech-language one, from 1874 on different locations

=== Subcarpathian Ruthenia ===
In 1936, there were 24 German-language schools in Subcarpathian Ruthenia, grouping 2,021 students.

== German-language press in Czechoslovakia ==
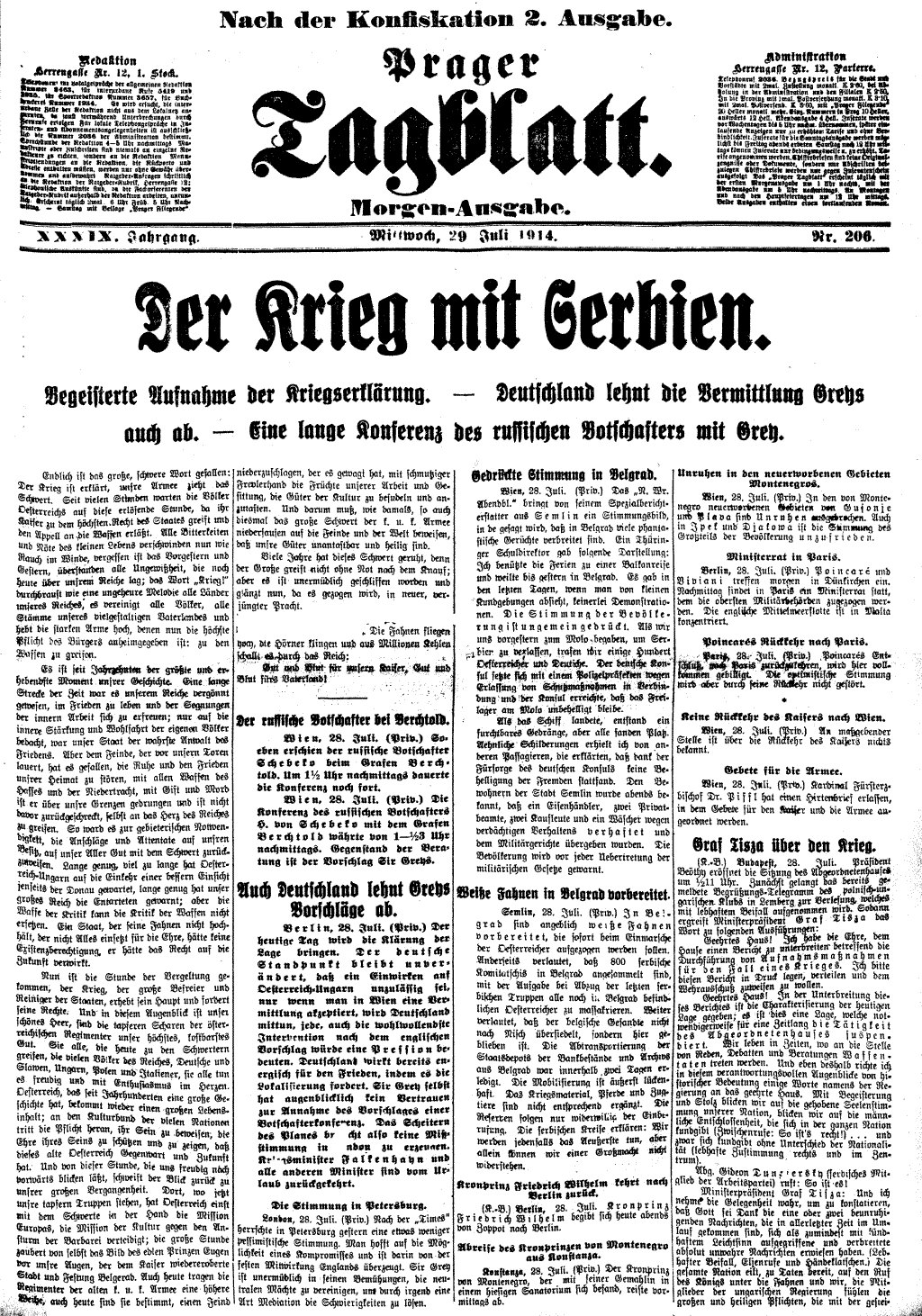
Prager Tagblatt. Front page 1914-07-29

in Bohemia

- Prager Tagblatt (1876-1939)
- Prager Presse (1921-1939) semi-official newspaper
- Selbstwehr
- Jüdische Volksstimme

in Slovakia

- Pressburger Zeitung, then Neue Pressburger Zeitung (1784-1945) (sk)
- Westungarischer Grenzbote (1872-1918), then Grenzbote (1919-1945) (eo)
- Jüdische Volkszeitung
- Israelitisches Familienblatt
- Jüdische Presse

in Carpathian Ruthenia

- Jüdische Stimme

== German-language personalities in Czechoslovakia ==
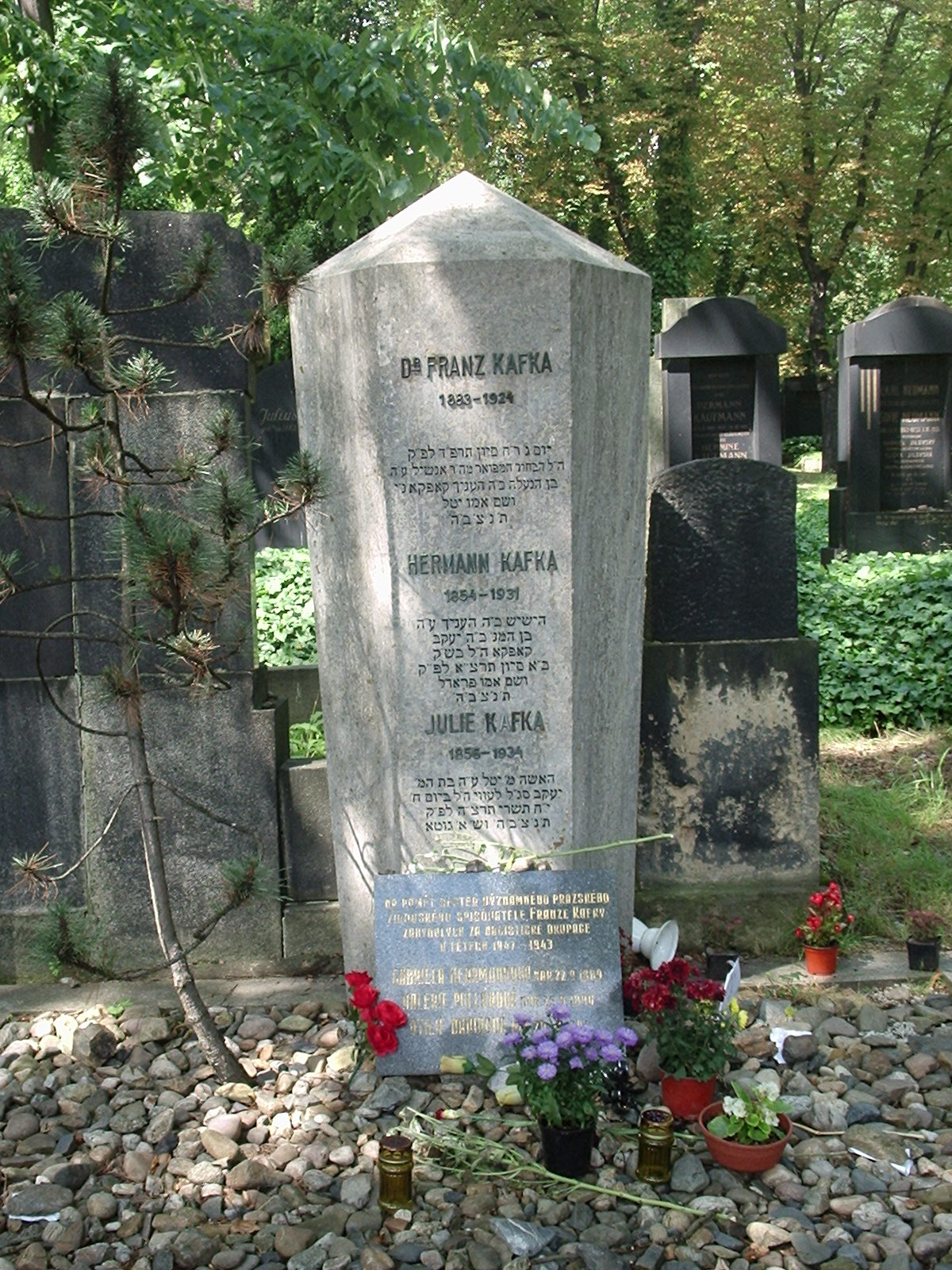
Franz Kafka's grave in Prague-Žižkov

=== Literature and journalism ===
- Max Brod
- Franz Kafka
- Egon Erwin Kisch
- František R. Kraus
- Leo Perutz
- Johannes Urzidil
- Felix Weltsch
- Franz Werfel

=== Science ===
- Johann Böhm, chemist
- Pavel Eisner, linguist
- Anton Gindely, historian
- František Graus, historian
- Alfred Kohn, histologist
- Karl Kreibich, dermatologist
- Gustav Karl Laube (geologist and paleontologist
- Arthur Mahler, archeologist
- Friedrich Reinitzer, chemist

== See also ==
- Germans in the Czech Republic
- German Bohemia
- Demographics of Bratislava
