= Prague German =

German dialect of Prague, Czech Republic

- Prager Deutsch
- Native to: Prague, Czech Republic
- Extinct: after 1945
- Language family: Indo-European: Germanic; German; Prague German
- Writing system: Latin

Language codes
- ISO 639-3: –
- Glottolog: None
- IETF: de-u-sd-CZ10

Prague German (German: Prager Deutsch, Czech: Pražská němčina) was the dialect of German spoken in Prague in what is now the Czech Republic. The written form of this dialect from the Luxembourg rule played an important role in the history of the German language for its balancing function between the written upper Austrian and southern German dialects and eastern Central dialects of central Germany, which later developed the spelling of Modern German writing (Standard German).

== History ==
In the historical development of Prague, there were four periods, which were culturally and linguistically autonomous.

=== List of periods ===
- First period (1310–1415), the period of the Luxembourg rule. During this time, linguistic phenomena approaching Middle High German spelling can be observed.
- Second period (1544–1620), after the Hussite period. At this time, Prague German was greatly influenced by Czech and lesser by Upper German.
- Third period (1620–1860), after 1627, the Prague German language evolved in its written form towards the Austrian variant of German. Spelling had not been normative yet, so there were fluctuations in voice and vocal quality.
- Fourth period (1861–1945), at the end of the 19th century, the Prague dialect of German was considered the finest German of the Austro-Hungarian monarchy. This language was mainly used by educated lawyers. In 1910 German speakers comprised just 4.5% of the population in Prague, yet they produced world-famous literature. Writers such as Rainer Maria Rilke, Franz Kafka, Max Brod, Franz Werfel, Egon Erwin Kisch, Friedrich Torberg, Oskar Baum, Johannes Urzidil, Felix Weltsch and Paul Leppin by some Germanists using a specific style, rather than to the Prague German refers to the literary patterns.

== A sample of the text in Prague German from the fourth period ==
- "Wissen Sie schon, Frau Krause, daß meine Tontscha sich mit dem jungen Janda verlobt hat?"
- "Der, was Beamter bei der Unionbank ist? Da gratulier ich aber! Wissen Sie, geahnt habe ich es schon längst; denn man hat ihn nie ohne ihr gesehen und sie hat keinen Schritt ohne ihm gemacht."
- "Ja, die beiden haben sich furchtbar gern. "Frau Rößler", hat er zu mir gesagt, "glauben Sie ja nicht, daß ich Ihre Tochter nur wegen dem Gelde heirate, das sie mitbekomt", hat er gesagt."
- "Das ist ein schöner Zug von ihm! Und nur was wahr is': ein fescher Mann is' er!"
- "Gewiß. Aber warum, meine Tonscha ist kein hübsches Mädel? Wissen Sie, gestern, da hat sie sich den neuen Hut angezogen, ich sag' Ihnen: eine Puppe! Und gescheit is' sie! Und gebildet! Und häuslich erzogen! Alles habe ich ihr gelernt: kochen, nähen, bügeln alles! Sogar Klavier spielen kann sie.“

The only word in the above dialogue that is not in the Standard German vocabulary is "Tontscha".

== Prague German newspapers ==
- Prager Oberpostamts-Zeitung, later Prager Zeitung
- Libussa (1802–1804), eine vaterländische Vierteljahrschrift
- Bohemia (1828–1938)
- Libussa (1851–1860), Jahrbuch für ...
- Lotos (1851–1942), Naturwissenschaftliche Zeitschrift
- Ärztliches Correspondenzblatt für Böhmen, Organ des Vereines Deutscher Ärzte in Prag (1864–1865, 1873–1875), later Prager medizinische Wochenschrift (1876–1915)
- Prager Tagblatt (1876–1939)
- Prager Abendblatt (1867–1918)
- Prager Presse (1921–1939)
- Sozialdemokrat (1925–1938), Zentralorgan der DSAP
- Beilage zu Rudý prapor (Rote Fahne) (1927–1928)
- Prager Rundschau (1931–1939)
- Deutsche Volks-Zeitung, Prag, Sprachrohr der deutschsprachigen Kommunisten in der Tschechoslowakei
- Die Weltbühne, (1934–1938 in Prague exile)
- Rote Fahne (1934–1938), kommunistisches Tagblatt
- Der Neue Tag (1939–1945), Tageszeitung für Böhmen und Mähren: amtliches Veröffentlichungsorgan des Reichsprotektors für Böhmen und Mähren und der nachgeordneten deutschen Dienststellen
- Prager Abend (1939–1944)
- Böhmen und Mähren (1940–1945), Blatt des Reichsprotektors
- Welt Studenten Nachrichten (1947–1990), Zeitschrift des Internationalen Studentenbundes
- Aufbau und Frieden (1951–1965), Wochenblatt der deutschen Werktätigen in der Tschechoslowakei, later Volkszeitung (1966–1968), later Prager Volkszeitung (1969–2005), Das Wochenblatt der Deutschen in der ČSSR / Wochenblatt der deutschen Bürger in der Tschechischen Republik
- Tschechoslowakei (1953–1960), Organ des Ministeriums für Information und Aufklärung, later Sozialistische Tschechoslowakei (1961–1990)
- Im Herzen Europas (1958–1971), Tschechoslowakische Monatsschrift, later Tschechoslowakisches Leben (1972–1992), later Tschechisches Leben heute (1993–1993)
- Informationsbulletin des Zentralkomitees der Kommunistischen Partei der Tschechoslowakei (1978–1989)
- Neue Prager Presse (1981–1990), Nachrichten aus Politik, Wirtschaft, Gesellschaft, Kultur, Sport
- IOJ Nachrichten (1985–1991), Zeitung der Internationale Journalistenorganisation
- Prager Zeitung (1991–)
- Deutsches Blatt, Beilage der Zeitung „Lidové noviny“
- Aussenhandel der Tschechischen Republik (1993), later Wirtschaft und Handel in der Tschechischen Republik (1994–2009)
- Die Länder der böhmischen Krone (1994–1997), Revue für Gesellschaft und Kultur
- Plus (1994–), Magazin der Deutsch-Tschechischen Industrie- und Handelskammer
- Landes-Anzeiger (1995–1998), Informationsblatt der Landesversammlung der Deutschen in Böhmen, Mähren und Schlesien, later Landes-Zeitung (Landeszeitung) (1999–2014), Zeitung der Deutschen in der Tschechischen Republik, later LandesECHO (2014–), Zeitschrift der Deutschen in der Tschechischen Republik
