= Ludwig Winder =

Austrian-Czech German-language writer, journalist and literary critic

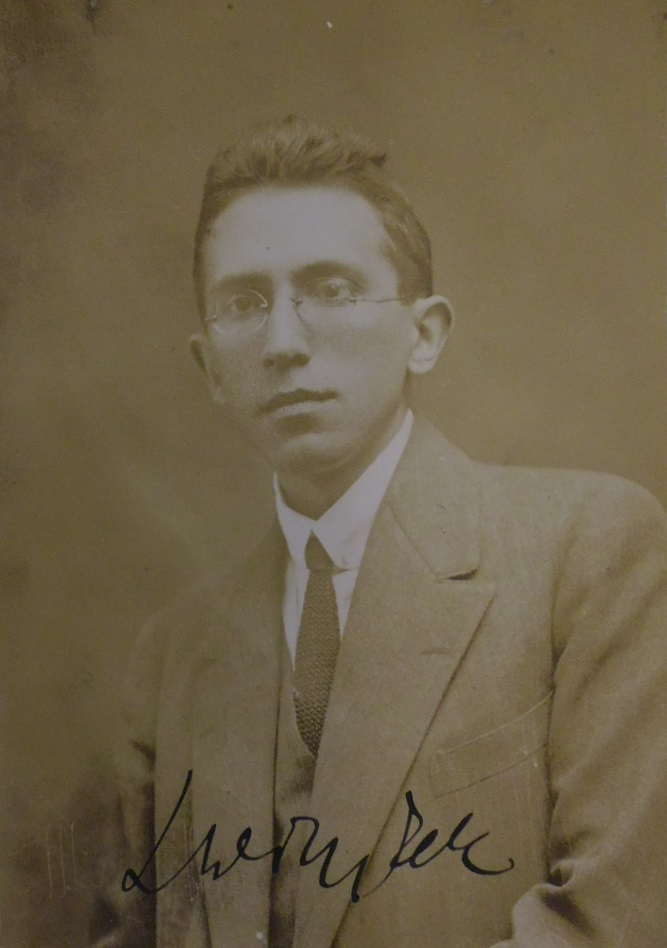
Ludwig Winder, ca. 1920

Ludwig Winder (7 February 1889 in Šafov – 16 June 1946 in Baldock) was an Austrian-Czech German-language writer, journalist and literary critic. He escaped Nazi persecution at the start of World War II when he and his family moved to the UK where he spent his last years.

== Life ==
Ludwig Winder was born in 1889 in Šafov in Moravia, Austria-Hungary, the son of a Jewish family, but grew up in nearby Holešov, where he was brought up in a strictly religious atmosphere. In 1906 he published his first poetry book at his own expense. After moving to Vienna in 1907 he worked for the liberal newspaper Die Zeit after completing his matriculation examination before joining the editorial staff of the nationalist Deutsche Zeitung Bohemia in Prague. He belonged to the so-called "Prague Circle" of writers which included Franz Kafka and was a close friend of the journalist and philosopher Felix Weltsch and the writers Oskar Baum, Max Brod, Johannes Urzidil and Ilse Aichinger.

He worked for various newspapers as an editor, literary critic, local journalist, theatre lecturer, etc. Between 1915 and 1938 he wrote over 2,500 feature articles for the newspaper Deutsche Zeitung Bohemia in Prague. In 1917 Winder published his first novel, Die rasende Rotationsmaschine which examined the difficulties faced by Jews from religious eastern communities in integrating themselves into modern western society. His semi-autobiographical novels Die juedische Orgel (1922) and Hugo: Tragoedie eines Knaben (1924) concern the battle of young eastern Jews for a secular existence. His play The Woman Without Qualities was used by Robert Musil as a model for his opus magnum Der Mann ohne Eigenschaften. In 1934 he was awarded the State Prize of the Czechoslovak Republic for German-language literature.

His later novels were concerned with the history and downfall of the Habsburg monarchy: these included Die Nachgeholten Freuden (1927) and Der Kammerdiener (1945), while his 1937 novel Der Thronfolger (The Heir to the Throne) was critical of the Archduke Franz Ferdinand and was banned shortly after its publication.

Particularly noteworthy is his novel The Jewish Organ (1922), which appeared in a new edition in 2001. The story of the Jew Albert, who grows up in the Jewish ghetto of a small town in Moravia takes up the classical themes of romanticism such as the fight against the father and self-realization through detachment from the family.

After the German occupation of Czechoslovakia Ludwig Winder fled on 29 June 1939 with his wife Hedwig (1891–1987) and their older daughter Marianne Winder through Poland and Scandinavia to England. The younger daughter Eva, born in 1920, chose to remain in Prague. She died in 1945 in the concentration camp at Bergen-Belsen. Six weeks after their arrival in England the Winders were evacuated to Reigate, where they lived in a refugee hostel for Czechs and where Marianne Winder was registered as a student aged 18. When the hostel was closed in 1941, the family moved to Baldock, then a small village in Hertfordshire.

In England Winder also worked in newspapers and continued to write novels under the two pseudonyms Herbert Moldau and G. A. List, under the latter name writing One Man's Answer and published by George G. Harrap in 1944. Other novels from this period include Die November-wolke (1942), a story about emigrants during a night-bombing raid in London, and Die Pflicht (1943 but only fully published in 1988) was probably commissioned by the Czechoslovak government-in-exile and dealt with the themes of domination, power and oppression faced by Czech resistance against their German invaders.

In the summer of 1941 Ludwig Winder was diagnosed with coronary thrombosis and he succumbed to his heart disease in Baldock on 16 June 1946 aged 57. His ashes were buried in London.

== Works (reprints) ==
- Dr. Muff. Novel. Zsolnay, Vienna 1990, ISBN 3-552-04210-5.
- The Jewish Organ. Novel. Residence, Salzburg 1999, ISBN 3-7017-1166-6.
- The Heir to the Throne: A Franz Ferdinand Romance. Zsolnay, Vienna 2014, ISBN 978-3-552-05673-2.

== Literature ==
- Jindra Broukalová: Ludwig Winder as a poet of the human soul and reality. A contribution to the contemplation of the novel "The heir to the throne, a Franz Ferdinand novel" in the context of the narrative work of its author. Univ. Karlova, Praha 2008, ISBN 978-80-7290-357-3.
- Arno Gassmann : Dear father, dear God? The father-son conflict among the authors of the closer Prague circle (Max Brod - Franz Kafka - Oskar tree - Ludwig Winder). Diss. Karlsruhe 2001, Hedgehog, Oldenburg 2002 (studies to the German literature, literature and media science 83), ISBN 3-89621-146-3.
- Gerhard Härle : How much beauty does the man need? Ludwig Winders, Hugo '- or the duel of outsiders. In: Forum Homosexuality and Literature 30 (1997), pp. 99–117.
- Kurt Krolop : Ludwig Winder (1889-1946). His life and his narrative early work. A contribution to the history of Prague German literature. Hall 1967.
- Margarita Pazi : An attempt by Jewish German-Czech symbiosis: Ludwig Winder. In: The German Quarterly 63/2 (1990), pp. 211–221.
- Christiane Spirek: A voice from Bohemia - the Prague author Ludwig Winder. In: Exile 17 (1997), p. 45-55.
- Judith von Sternburg: God's evil dreams. The novels of Ludwig Winders. With a preliminary remark by Dieter Sudhoff . Hedgehog, Paderborn 1994.
- Patricia-Charlotta Steinfeld [ed.]: Ludwig Winder (1889-1946) and the Prague German literature. First full bibliography of the work Ludwig Winder. Röll, Dettelbach 2009.
- Theisohn, Philipp (2007). "Winder, Ludwig". In Berenbaum, Michael; Skolnik, Fred (eds.). Encyclopaedia Judaica. Vol. 21 (2nd ed.). Detroit: Macmillan Reference. p. 80. ISBN 978-0-02-866097-4.
