= Alice Herz-Sommer =

Israeli classical pianist (1903–2014)

Alice Herz-Sommer אליס הרץ-זומר

Background information
- Born: Alice Herz; 26 November 1903; Prague, Bohemia, Austria-Hungary
- Died: 23 February 2014 (aged 110 years, 89 days) London, England
- Genre: Classical music
- Occupations: Pianist, music teacher

Alice Herz-Sommer (Hebrew: אליס הרץ-זומר; née Herz; 26 November 1903 – 23 February 2014), was a Czech-born Israeli classical pianist, music teacher, and supercentenarian who survived Theresienstadt concentration camp. She lived for 40 years in Israel, before emigrating to London in 1986, where she resided until her death, and at the age of 110 was the world's oldest known Holocaust survivor until Yisrael Kristal was recognized as such.

== Early life ==
Alice Herz was born in Prague, in the Kingdom of Bohemia (a part of Austria-Hungary) in the modern-day Czech Republic, to Friedrich and Sofie "Gigi" Herz. Herz's family was part of the small German-speaking minority of assimilated Jews in Prague, although Herz stated that she also spoke Czech. Her father was a merchant and her mother was highly educated and moved in circles of well-known writers. She had two sisters, including a twin sister, Mariana, and two brothers. Her parents ran a cultural salon where Herz, as a child, met writers including Franz Kafka and Franz Werfel, composers including Gustav Mahler, philosophers, and intellectuals such as Sigmund Freud. Herz once noted that "Kafka was a slightly strange man. He used to come to our house, sit and talk with my mother, mainly about his writing. He did not talk a lot, but rather loved quiet and nature. We frequently went on trips together. I remember that Kafka took us to a very nice place outside Prague. We sat on a bench and he told us stories." Herz's sister Irma was married to Felix Weltsch, who was a prominent German-language Jewish philosopher, journalist, librarian, and Zionist who later worked as a librarian in Jerusalem after his emigration from Austria.

Herz's older sister Irma taught her how to play the piano, which she studied diligently, and the Austrian-Jewish pianist Artur Schnabel, a friend of the family, encouraged her to pursue a career as a classical musician, a choice she decided to make. She went on to study under the Czech pianist Václav Štěpán (1889–1944) and at the German Academy of Music in Prague, where she was the youngest pupil. Herz married the businessman and amateur musician Leopold Sommer in 1931; the couple had a son, Stephan (later known as Raphael, 1937–2001). She began giving concerts and making a name for herself across Europe until the Nazis took over Prague, as they did not allow Jews to perform in public, join music competitions or teach non-Jewish pupils.

== Second World War ==
After the invasion of Czechoslovakia, most of Herz-Sommer's family and friends emigrated to Israel via Romania, including Max Brod and brother-in-law Felix Weltsch, but Herz-Sommer stayed in Prague to care for her ill mother, Sofie, aged 72; both women were arrested and Sofie Herz was murdered in a concentration camp. In July 1943 Herz was sent to Theresienstadt, where she played in more than 100 concerts along with other musicians, performing pieces by Beethoven, Bach, Brahms, Schumann, and Chopin among other Czech composers for prisoners and guards. She commented of her performances in the camp:

We had to play because the Red Cross came three times a year. The Germans wanted to show its representatives that the situation of the Jews in Theresienstadt was good. Whenever I knew that I had a concert, I was happy. Music is magic. We performed in the council hall before an audience of 150 old, hopeless, sick and hungry people. They lived for the music. It was like food to them. If they hadn't come [to hear us], they would have died long before. As we would have.

Herz-Sommer was billeted with her son during their time at the camp; he was one of only a few children to survive Theresienstadt. Her husband died of typhus in Dachau, six weeks before the camp was liberated.

== Later life ==
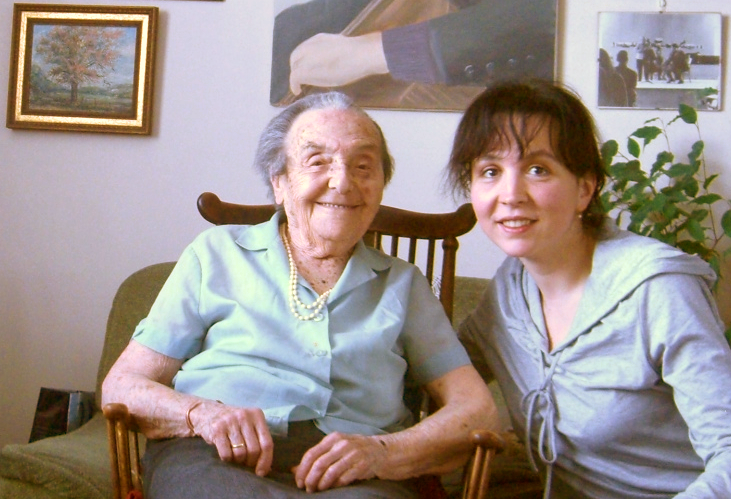
Pianists Alice Herz-Sommer (left) and Luiza Borac 2010 in London

After the Soviet liberation of Theresienstadt in 1945, she and Raphael returned to Prague, and in March 1949 emigrated to Israel, to be reunited with some of her surviving family, including her twin sister, Mariana. Herz lived in Israel for almost 40 years, working as a music teacher at the Jerusalem Academy of Music, until emigrating to London in 1986.

In London Herz-Sommer lived close to her family in a one-room flat in Belsize Park, visited almost daily by her closest friends, her grandson Ariel Sommer, and daughter-in-law Genevieve Sommer. She practised playing the piano three hours a day until the end of her life. She stated that optimism was the key to her life:

I look at the good. When you are relaxed, your body is always relaxed. When you are pessimistic, your body behaves in an unnatural way. It is up to us whether we look at the good or the bad. When you are nice to others, they are nice to you. When you give, you receive.

She also declared a firm belief in the power of music: "Music saved my life and music saves me still... I am Jewish, but Beethoven is my religion."

Her son Raphael, an accomplished cellist and conductor, died in 2001, aged 64, of an aneurysm in Israel at the end of a concert tour. He was survived by his wife and two sons.

Alice Herz-Sommer died in hospital in London on 23 February 2014, aged 110, after being admitted two days previously. Her death was confirmed by her grandson, Ariel Sommer. She is buried at the St Pancras and Islington Cemetery in East Finchley, north London.

Throughout her long life, Alice Herz-Sommer continuously proclaimed:

I am still grateful for life. Life is a present.

== Media ==
External videos
- Learning to play the piano, Alice Herz-Sommer interview, 4:58, 1st of 12 parts, 1 August 2017

A Century of Wisdom: Lessons From the Life of Alice Herz-Sommer the World's Oldest Living Holocaust Survivor (2012), with an introduction by President Václav Havel, was written about her life and translated in 26 countries. Herz-Sommer was the subject of A Garden of Eden in Hell, first published in German in 2005 (reprinted in English as Alice's Piano).

The BBC TV documentary Alice Sommer Herz at 106: Everything Is a Present, written and produced by Christopher Nupen, was first broadcast on BBC Four. She was featured on BBC Radio 4's Woman's Hour in 2004 and in The Times, and The Guardian. She was one of two subjects featured in the film Refuge in Music.

The Lady in Number 6, filmed when Herz was 109, documents her life and won an Academy Award for Best Short Documentary.

The song "Dancing Under the Gallows", by Chris While and Julie Matthews, from their 2014 album Who We Are, celebrates the life of Alice Herz-Sommer.
