= Oskar Baum =

Czech music educator and writer

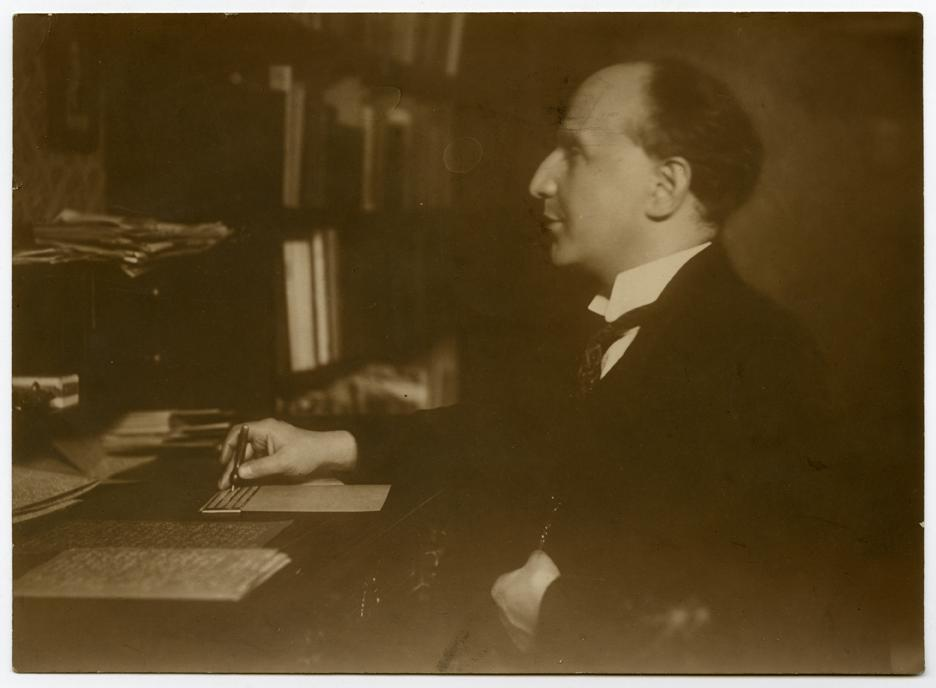
- Baum in the 1920s
- Born: 21 January 1883; Plzeň, Bohemia, Austria-Hungary
- Died: 20 March 1941 (aged 58); Prague, Protectorate of Bohemia and Moravia

Oskar Baum (21 January 1883 – 20 March 1941) was a Czech music educator and writer in the German language.

== Life ==
Baum was born on 21 January 1883 in Plzeň in Bohemia, as the son of a Jewish cloth goods merchant. He had vision problems from the time of his birth. At eight, he lost the sight in one eye and at the age of eleven, during a scuffle, he lost his sight completely. Since he could no longer participate in school, the class teacher sent him to Vienna to the Israelite Institute for the Blind, a high school. There he trained as a music consultant and learned the organ and piano. In 1902, he put aside his teaching degree and returned to Prague. Baum earned his living as an organist and cantor in a synagogue; later he became a piano teacher.

In 1904, Baum made the acquaintance of Max Brod and Ludwig Winder with Franz Kafka and Felix Weltsch. The four became close friends with Baum, and after Baum's marriage to Margarete Schnabel, the couple's apartment became the meeting place of the Prague Circle. Here, the friends engaged in reading each other's literary texts, but they were also enthusiastic about exploring foreign texts and chamber music. During this time, a lively correspondence between Kafka and Baum began.

Baum died on 20 March 1941 in Prague of the consequences of an intestinal operation. Shortly after his death his wife Margarete was deported to Theresienstadt Ghetto where she died a year later. His only son Leo (born 1909) died on 22 July 1946 in the King David Hotel bombing by Irgun in Jerusalem.

== Bibliography ==
- Archiv Bibliographia Judaica, ed. (1992). "Baum, Oskar". Lexikon deutsch-jüdischer Autoren (in German). Vol. I (A - Benc). Berlin: K. G. Saur. pp. 398–404. doi:10.1515/9783110975864. ISBN 3-598-22680-2. OCLC 979630446.
- Glosíková, Viera; Nagelschmidt, Ilse; Thomas, Kilian, eds. (2020). Mit der Schrift sehen - der Prager deutsche Autor Oskar Baum (in German). Berlin: Frank & Timme. ISBN 978-3-7329-0717-5.
