= Marianne Winder =

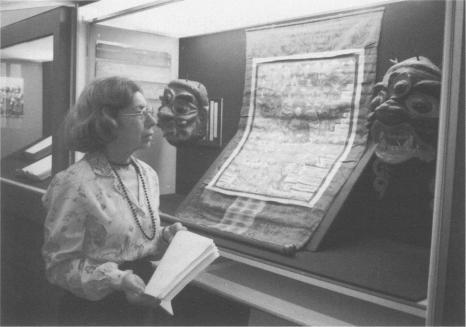
Marianne Winder looking at a Tibetan thanka displayed at the exhibition 'Body and Mind in Tibetan Medicine' in 1986 (Wellcome Library, London)

Marianne Winder (10 September 1918 – 6 April 2001) was a Czech-British specialist in Middle High German and a librarian at the Institute of Germanic Studies at the University of London. She later was associated for more than thirty years with the Wellcome Library of the Wellcome Institute for the History of Medicine where she was successively Assistant Librarian (1963–1970), Curator of Eastern Printed Manuscripts and Books (1970–1978) and finally, after having retired, a Tibetan medical consultant (1978–2001).

== Biography ==
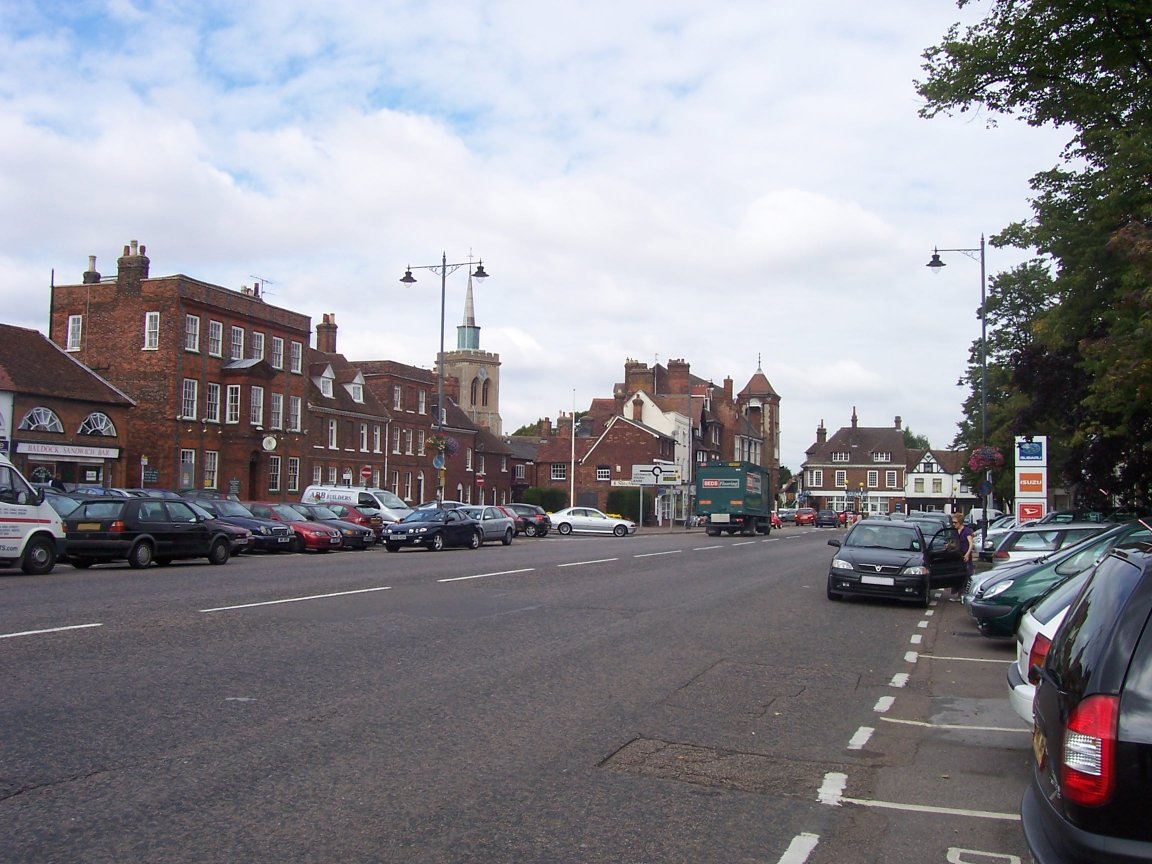
In 1941 the Winders moved to Baldock in Hertfordshire - the High Street shown in 2007

Marianne Winder was born on 10 September 1918 in Teplice in Bohemia, in the last days of Austro-Hungarian Empire. She was the eldest of the two daughters of Ludwig Winder (1889–1946), a writer and literary critic, and Hedwig Winder (1891–1987). Her early life was bound up in the social milieu of the Jewish intelligentsia of Central Europe before its destruction during World War I. Franz Kafka was part of the literary circle the "Prague Circle" in pre-War Prague that included her father, and this no doubt influenced Marianne Winder's interest in German literature. When the political situation deteriorated in the 1930s the Winder family was forced to leave Prague to seek refuge in England. After the German occupation of Czechoslovakia, Winder fled on 29 June 1939, when he crossed the Polish border illegally with his family, his journey taking him across Poland and Scandinavia to England, where he arrived with his wife and daughter Marianne on 13 July 1939. His youngest daughter, and Marianne's younger sister, Eva, born in 1920, remained in Prague. She died in 1945 in the concentration camp at Bergen-Belsen. Six weeks after their arrival in England the Winders were evacuated to Reigate, where they lived in a refugee hostel and where Marianne was registered as a student aged 18. When the inn was closed in 1941, the family moved to Baldock, then a small village in Hertfordshire. In the summer of 1941 Ludwig Winder was diagnosed with coronary thrombosis and he succumbed to his heart disease in Baldock on 16 June 1946.

== Studies ==
After the War, Marianne Winder began studying German as an external student at the University of London. On gaining her honours degree in 1948 she obtained a post as Tutorial Assistant in the Department of German at the University of Nottingham. At Nottingham she completed a Master's thesis on the etymology of High Middle German words, an excerpt from which was published in 1952 as a supplement to Maurice Walshe's dictionary, A Concise German Etymological Dictionary. As no etymological dictionary of High Middle German in medieval German texts existed at that time her contribution was significant in the field.

== Career ==
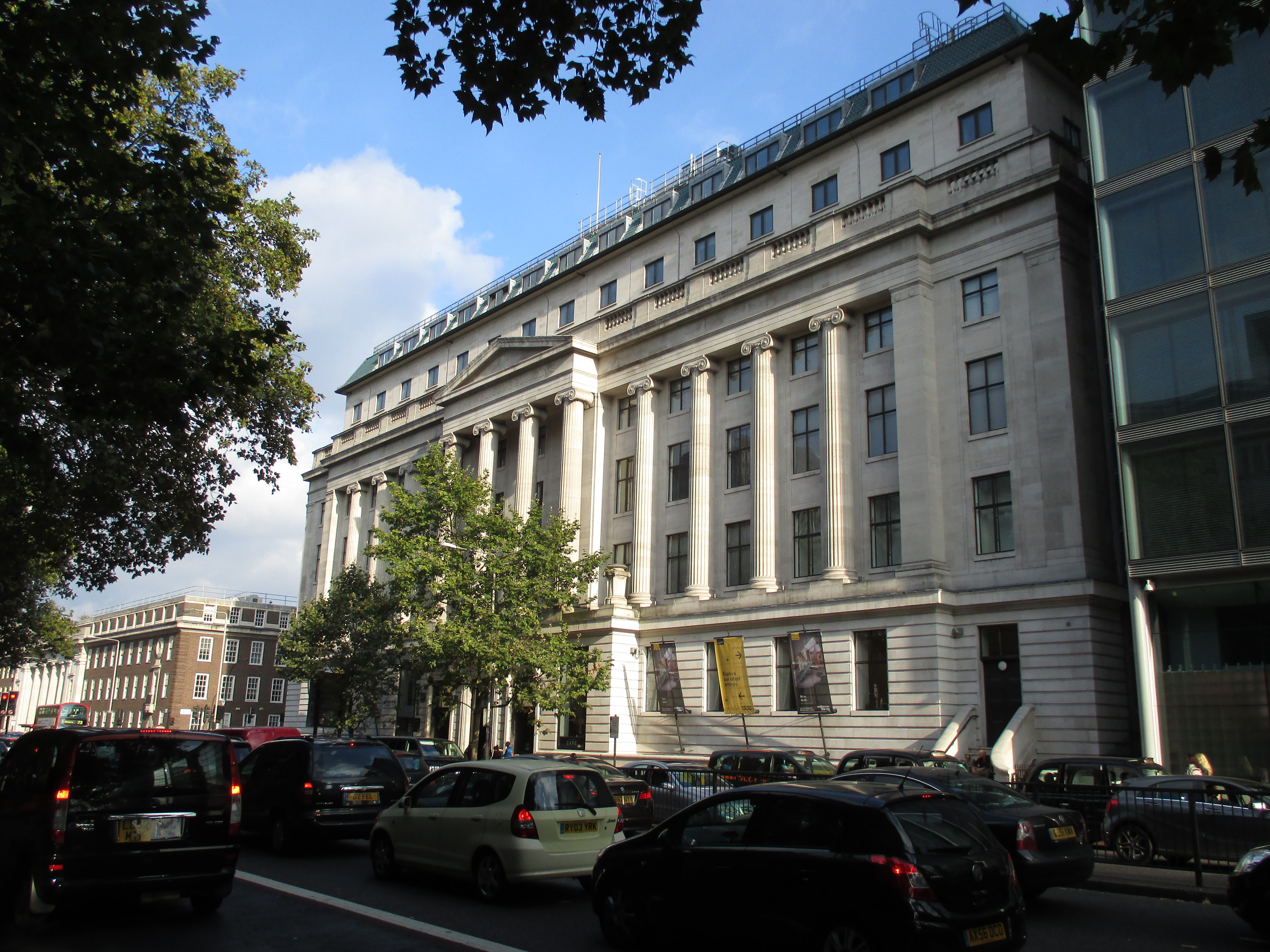
The Wellcome Library, where Winder worked from 1966 to 2001

In 1953 Winder was appointed Assistant Librarian at the Institute of Germanic Studies at the University of London, where she continued her research on German language and literature. She was interested in the writings of the Middle Ages and the Renaissance on astrology. She defended a thesis on German astrological books from 1452 to 1600 and graduated in 1963 with a degree in Librarianship from University College London. Her dissertation was published in 1966 in The Annals of Science. At this time she accepted the position of Assistant Librarian in the Wellcome Library at the Wellcome Institute for the History of Medicine where she was to remain for the rest of her career.

At the Wellcome Institute her linguistic knowledge proved to be very useful for cataloging and organising the collection. She collaborated with Dr. Walter Pagel, a pathologist and medical historian, and co-authored with him several articles including 'Gnostiches bei Paracelsus und Konrad von Megenberg' in Fachliteratur des Mittlelalters, (1968); 'Hervey and the "Modern" Concept of Disease', in The Bulletin of the History of Medicine, (1968); 'The Eightness of Adam and Related "Gnostic" Ideas in the Paracelsian Corpus' in Ambix, (1969). In 1972 she established the bibliography of Dr. Pagel's writings in Science, medicine and society in the Renaissance, in a tribute volume in his honour. On Pagel's death in 1983 she took charge of the publication of his complete work in two volumes, the first published in 1985 under the title Religion and Neoplatonism in Renaissance Medicine, the second in 1986 entitled From Paracelsus to Van Helmont.

Having converted to Buddhism she became Archivist for the Buddhist Society. In 1957 she had published the German translation of Edward Conze's Buddhist Texts Through the Ages but emphasized that she did not associate herself with all the points of view expressed in this autobiography, let alone with the passages on the President of the Buddhist Society Christmas Humphreys who, according to her, had had the most beneficial influence on her life.

Winder spoke several languages, including Sanskrit and Buddhist Pali. In 1958 she became deputy editor of the Buddhist Society's magazine The Middle Way and succeeded Mrs Carlo Robins as editor-in-chief from 1961 to 1965, when she was succeeded by Muriel Daw. Winder was also interested in the language and culture of Tibet and took lessons in Tibetan at the School of Oriental and African Studies. When the position of Curator of Oriental Manuscripts and Prints was created at the Wellcome Institute in 1970 she gained it. This was the beginning of Winder's second career.

== Second career ==
Winder undertook to catalogue and classify the collections for which she was responsible and to place them within the reach of the specialists of Eastern Studies, a vast task which made them a leading source for the study of the medicine in Asian cultures. At the same time she began a collaboration with Rechung Rinpoché Jampal Kunzang which led to the publication in 1973 of Tibetan Medicine: Illustrated in Original Texts, for which she also wrote the Introduction and which, through its foreign editions in Chinese and French and its revisions, became a classic on Tibetan medicine and the first work in English on the subject. Always willing to learn, the new Curator attended all the classes of the English Tibetologist David Snellgrove.

== Retirement ==
Upon her retirement from the Wellcome Institute in 1978 Winder was appointed Consultant in Tibetan Medicine at the Institute which allowed her to continue her work on the Catalogue of Tibetan manuscripts and xylographs, and the catalogue of thankas, banners and other paintings and drawings in the Library of the Wellcome Institute for the History of Medicine, which was published in 1989. Her successor at the Wellcome Institute was Nigel Allan.

In September 1985 she participated in an international workshop on the study of Indian medicine where she presented her paper 'Vaidarya' which was published in the Proceedings of the Symposium as Studies in Indian Medicine.

In 1986 Winder organized a conference on aspects of classical Tibetan medicine in Central Asia together with a leading exhibition, 'Body and Mind in Tibetan Medicine', at the Wellcome Institute in London, and for which she also produced the exhibition catalogue. The Proceedings of the conference were under her direction and were published in 1993 under the title Aspects of Classical Tibetan Medicine. Winder sat on the Council for Ambix, the Journal of the Society for the History of Alchemy and Chemistry, and acted as a consultant for the book Eastern Healing: the practical guide to the healing traditions of China, India, Tibet and India published just before her death.

Marianne Winder died in London in April 2001 aged 82 after a short illness.

== Books ==
- Im Zeichen Buddhas, Fischer Bücherei, Frankfurt am Main u. a. 1957 (Fischer-Bücherei 144), traduction en allemand de Buddhist texts through the ages d'Edward Conze
- with Rechung Rinpoché Jampal Kunzang, Tibetan medicine: illustrated in original texts, 1973
- with Walter Pagel, Religion and neoplatonism in Renaissance medicine, Variorum Reprints, 1985, 346 p.
- with Rechung Rinpoché, Histoire de la médecine tibétaine. Vie de gYu-thog-pa l'Ancien, traduit de l'anglais par Jean-Paul R. Claudon, Sylvaine Jean et Martine Pageon-Tarin, Édition Le Chardon, Saint-Dié (Vosges), 1989, 279 p., ISBN 2-906849-06-5
- Catalogue of Tibetan manuscripts and xylographs, and catalogue of thankas, banners and other paintings and drawings in the Library of the Wellcome Institute for the History of Medicine, London, Wellcome Institute for the History of Medicine, 1989, pp. XIII, 112S, illus.

== Articles ==
- with Walter Pagel, 'Gnostiches bei Paracelsus und Konrad von Megenberg', in Fachliteratur des Mittlelalters, 1968
- 'The Eightness of Adam and related to "gnostic" ideas in the Paracelsian corpus', in Ambix, 1969
- 'Modern and traditional medicine: rivals or friends? Some solutions attempted by India, China, Japan and Tibetans in exile'. Bulletin of the British Association of Orientalists, 1979-1980, 11, p. 35-39.
- 'Tibetan Medicine Compared with Ancient and Medieval Western Medicine', Bulletin of Tibetology, 1981, Vol. 17, N. 1, p. 5-22.
- 'The Buddhist antecedents of Tibetan medicine', Tibet News Review, 2(1/2) (1981), p. 29-34.
- 'Buddhism and Tibetology', Bulletin of Tibetology, 1984, Vol. 20, N. 1, p. 10-13.
- Tibetan Buddhist medicine and psychiatry. The diamond healing, Med Hist. 1985; 29(2) : p. 224.
- 'Malli Ka', Bulletin of Tibetology, 1988, Vol. 24, N. 3, p. 5-11.
- 'Tibetan medicine', Bulletin of Tibetology, 1989, Vol. 25, N. 2, p. 5-16.
- 'Vaidurya', Bulletin of Tibetology, 1990, Vol. 26, N. 1-3, p. 31-37.
- 'Aspects of the history of the prayer wheel', Bulletin of Tibetology, 1992, Vol. 28, N. 1, p. 25-33.
- 'Tibetan Medicine, its Humours and Elements', Bulletin of Tibetology, 1994, Vol. 30, N. 1, p. 11-25.
- 'Der Buddhismus und die tibetische Medizin', Tibet Forum, no. 2, (1985), p. 7-10.
