= Wellcome Library =

Library and research collection in London, England

Coordinates: 51.5257°N 0.1349°W

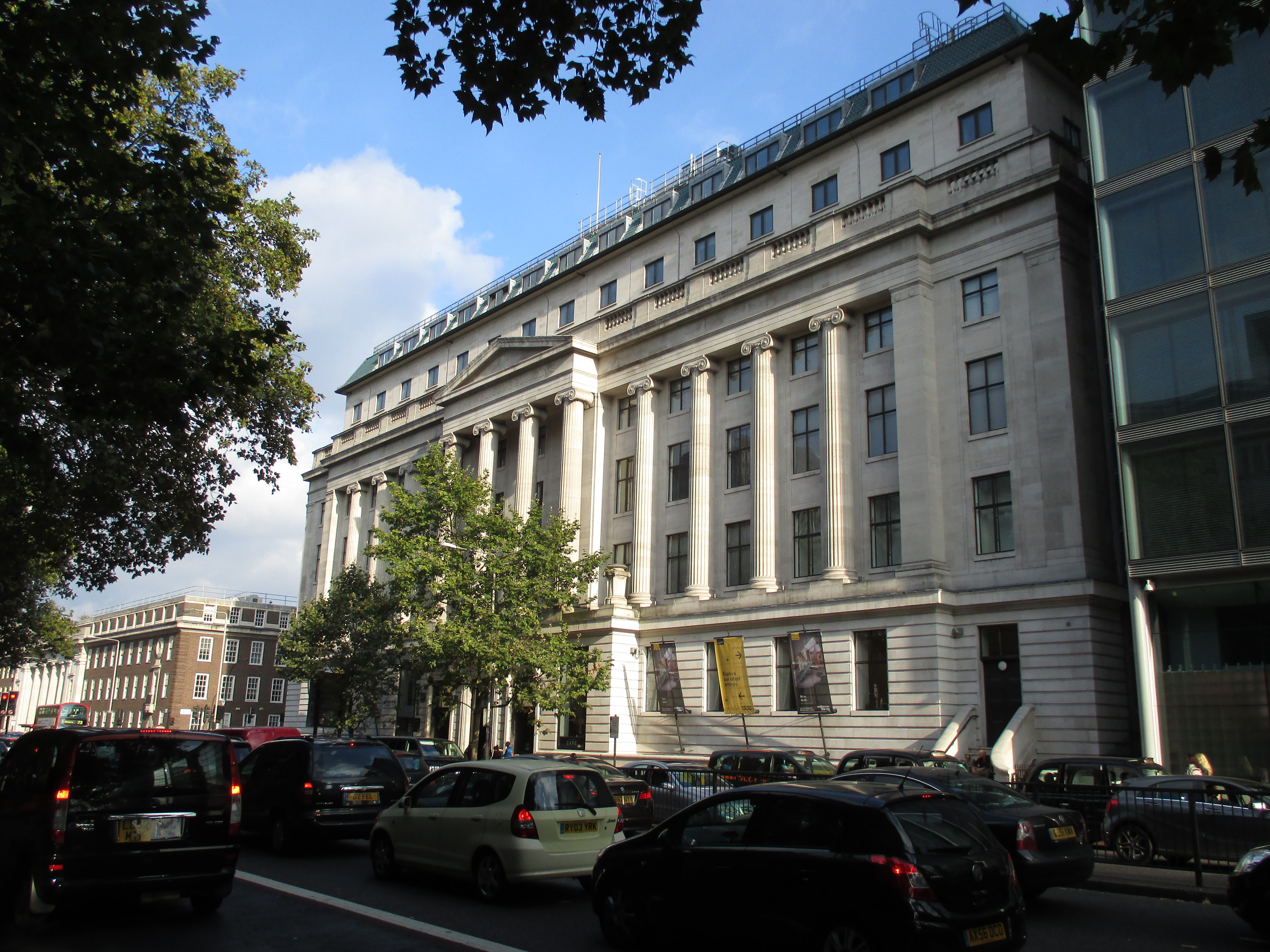
- Location: Euston Road, London, England
- Established: 1949
- Architect: Septimus Warwick

Collection
- Items collected: Books, journals, archives, manuscripts, sound and music recordings, films, videos, databases, ephemera, prints, drawings, paintings, and photographs
- Size: 2.5 million items

Access and use
- Access requirements: Open to anyone with a research or study interest in the history and progress of medicine.

Other information
- Website: wellcomelibrary.org

The Wellcome Library is a free library and Museum based in central London. It was developed from the collection formed by Sir Henry Wellcome (1853–1936), whose personal wealth allowed him to create one of the most ambitious collections of the 20th century. Henry Wellcome's interest was the history of medicine in a broad sense and included subjects such as alchemy or witchcraft, but also anthropology and ethnography. Since Henry Wellcome's death in 1936, the Wellcome Trust has been responsible for maintaining the Library's collection and funding its acquisitions. The library is free and open to the public.

== History ==
Henry Wellcome began collecting books seriously in the late 1890s, using a succession of agents and dealers, and by travelling around the world to gather whatever could be found. Wellcome's first major entry into the market took place at the auction of William Morris's library in 1898, where he was the biggest single purchaser, taking away about a third of the lots. His interests were truly international and the broad coverage of languages and traditions is one of the library's strengths. Significant collections acquired during this early period included the library of Joseph Frank Payne, medical historian and librarian of the Royal College of Physicians, purchased in 1911, and the major part of the library of the Munich historian Ernst Darmstaedter, bought in 1930.

When Henry Wellcome died, the bulk of his estate and his collection was bequeathed to a body of trustees, who formed the Wellcome Trust. Their primary duty was to use the income generated by the trust to support ongoing biomedical research, but they were also charged with fostering the study of medical history through the care and maintenance of the collections. A programme of sorting and rationalising was therefore begun, which lasted throughout the 1940s and beyond.

The library's story during the later decades of the 20th century has been one of continuing growth and development. A significant addition during the 1980s was the purchase of the manuscripts, and about 10,000 printed books, from the Medical Society of London Library.

=== Nomenclature ===
The Wellcome Library has been renamed more than once. Over the years from the early twentieth century onwards it has been known, formally and informally, as "The Wellcome Reference Library" (c. 1930), "The Wellcome Research Library" (to 1941), "Wellcome Historical Medical Museum and Library" (to 1968), "The Wellcome Historical Medical Research Library" (late 1960s and early 1970s), "Wellcome Institute of (later "for") the History of Medicine [Library]," "Wellcome Institute Library" (1980s), "Wellcome Library for the History and Understanding of Medicine" (early 2000s), and "Wellcome Collection: The Library" (since 2007). Many people refer to the library informally as "The Wellcome Library, London."

The Wellcome Trust's activities around the history of medicine, and on the public understanding of science, were brought together in 1998 to create a new Medicine, Society, and History Division. Recognizing a wider remit than history of medicine only, the library is today (2019) part of Wellcome Collection and aims to promote both the history and understanding of medicine.

== Collections ==
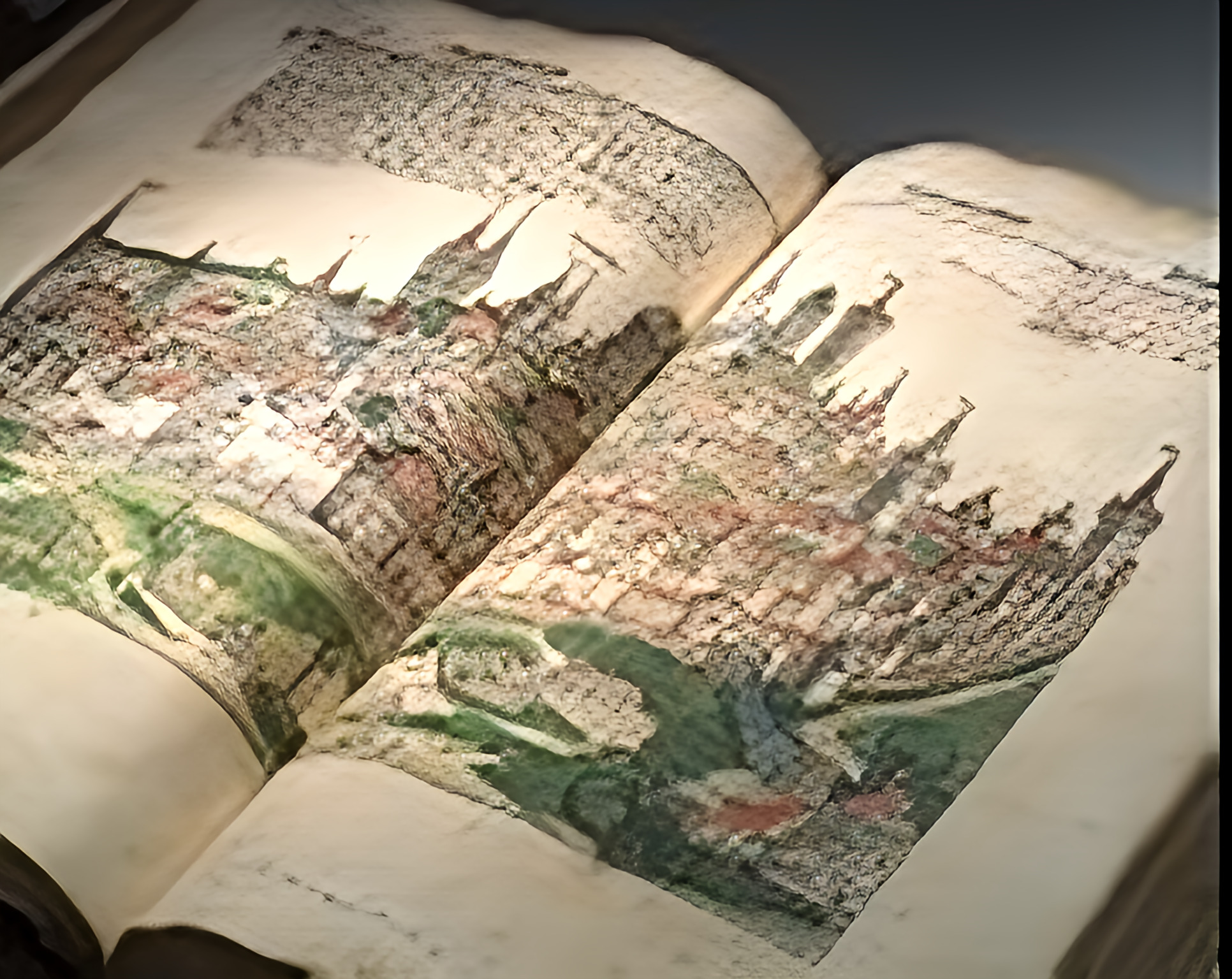
Liber chronicarum - more commonly known as the Nuremberg Chronicle. The book is a history chronicle, starting from the Creation, written in Latin by Hartmann Schedel, a doctor from Nuremberg. It was purchased by Henry Wellcome in 1898, at the auction of the Library of William Morris.

=== History of medicine collection ===
A collection of books, journals and other print materials, and electronic resources, dealing with the history of all aspects of medical science and practice, as well as allied scientific disciplines, social sciences, and humanities - currently comprises more than 80,000 volumes in many languages, published from 1850 to the present day.

=== Medical Collection ===
The Medical Collection contains printed works of medical and scientific literature published from the 15th century to the present day, including rare books and ephemera. The collection comprises thousands of medical monographs, anatomical atlases, pharmacopoeias and some 20,000 items of medical ephemera, as well as a growing number of electronic resources covering a diverse range of subjects including popular science, consumer health, biomedical science policy, research ethics, science education and public engagement with science.

=== Asian collections ===
Comprises 12,000 manuscripts and 4,000 printed books in 43 different languages and written on materials including paper, palm leaf, silk, ivory, metal, bone, bamboo and tree bark. A medical prescription from ancient Egypt, written on papyrus (c. 1100 BCE), is the oldest document in the Wellcome Library. The largest manuscript collection in the library is the Indic collection, which includes one of the largest Sanskrit collections outside India, numbering approximately 6,500 items.

=== Archives and manuscripts ===
Includes many unpublished European records dating from antiquity to the 20th century - the manuscripts contain material in 25 different languages. The (mainly) 20th century archives concentrate on material in English. They include papers of eminent figures in medical science and related areas (such as Francis Crick and Melanie Klein) as well as records of numerous and diverse organisations:

- Action on Smoking and Health
- British Psychological Society
- Family Planning Association
- Neonatal Society
- The Physiological Society

=== Rare book collection ===
Approximately 60,000 pre-1851 rare books including c. 600 incunabula (books printed before 1501) and c. 5000 books from the 16th century. All aspects of medical science and practice are represented, and there are wide and varied holdings in allied subjects.

=== Paintings, prints and drawings collection ===
More than 100,000 prints, drawings, paintings, photographs and other media, ranging from the 14th century to the present day, and geographically from Japan and China in the east through Tibet and India to Turkey, Europe and the Americas, with smaller collections dealing with Africa and Australasia. In accordance with Wellcome's philosophy, the works show the historical and cultural contexts of medicine as well as internal developments in medical techniques and practices.

=== Moving image and sound collections ===
More than 4,000 films and videos and 1,500 audio tapes, both broadcast and non-broadcast, covering the many and varied aspects of medicine: social and clinical areas of science, historical and current topics, physical and psychological aspects of health and surgery. Some of these titles are available through a YouTube channel.

=== Wellcome images ===
A selection of images from the Wellcome Library's collections were included in Wellcome Images, from illustrations in manuscripts and rare books to painting, prints and photographs. In January 2014 these images were released under a Creative Commons-Attribution licence for commercial and non-commercial use. 97,455 of these CC-licensed images have been bulk-uploaded to Wikimedia Commons. Wellcome Images also had a large collection of contemporary clinical and biomedical images from teaching hospitals, research laboratories and photographers throughout the UK and beyond. These were freely available for download for personal, academic teaching or study use, also under Creative Commons licences.

In 2017, Wellcome Images was closed and the images made available through the main catalogue search at wellcomecollection.org under Creative Commons and Public Domain licenses.

== Wikimedian in residence ==
From May 2016 until October 2017, the Wellcome Library was host to a Wikimedian in residence, jointly supported by Wikimedia UK. The residency's aims included improving the visibility and use of images from the Wellcome uploaded to Wikimedia Commons, training staff and visitors how to edit, and helping to improve medicine and history of medicine content on Wiki-projects (particularly pages on mental health).

== See also ==
- Marianne Winder
