= Šafov =

- Municipality
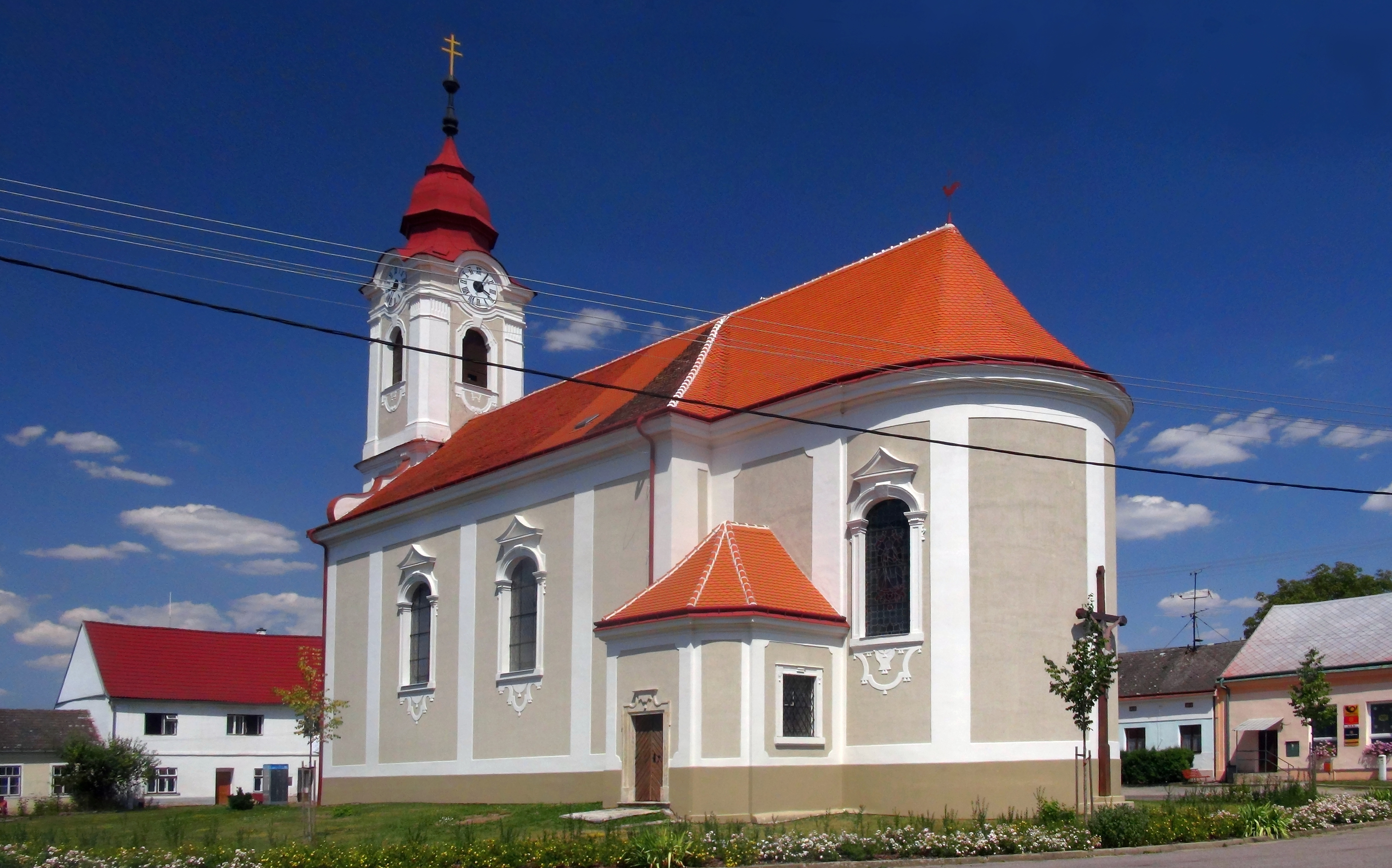
- Church of Saint Bartholomew

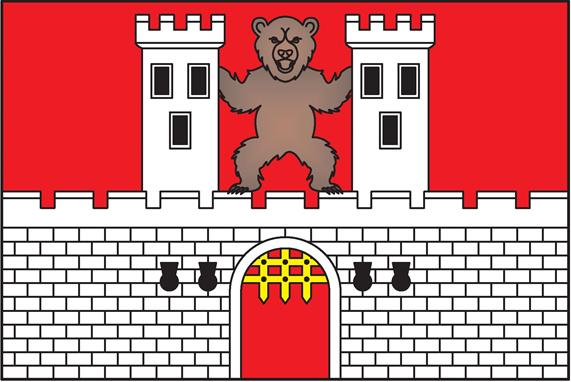
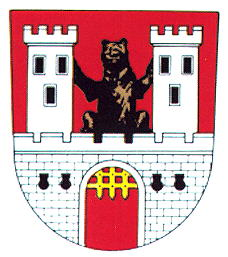
- Flag Coat of arms

- Location in the Czech Republic
- Coordinates: 48°52′0″N 15°44′5″E
- Country: Czech Republic
- Region: South Moravian
- District: Znojmo
- First mentioned: 1323

Area
  - Total: 9.50 km^{2} (3.67 sq mi)
- Elevation: 439 m (1,440 ft)

Population (2026-01-01)
  - Total: 131
  - Density: 13.8/km^{2} (35.7/sq mi)
- Time zone: UTC+1 (CET)
  - Summer (DST): UTC+2 (CEST)
- Postal code: 671 06
- Website: www.safov.cz

Šafov (German: Schaffa) is a municipality and village in Znojmo District in the South Moravian Region of the Czech Republic. It has about 100 inhabitants.

Šafov lies approximately 23 kilometres (14 mi) west of Znojmo, 75 km (47 mi) south-west of Brno, and 166 km (103 mi) south-east of Prague.

== Demographics ==
Historical population
| Year | Pop. | ±% |
|---|---|---|
| 1869 | 1,436 | — |
| 1880 | 1,089 | −24.2% |
| 1890 | 1,060 | −2.7% |
| 1900 | 942 | −11.1% |
| 1910 | 798 | −15.3% |
| 1921 | 748 | −6.3% |
| 1930 | 772 | +3.2% |
| 1950 | 354 | −54.1% |
| 1961 | 286 | −19.2% |
| 1970 | 254 | −11.2% |
| 1980 | 215 | −15.4% |
| 1991 | 172 | −20.0% |
| 2001 | 183 | +6.4% |
| 2011 | 153 | −16.4% |
| 2021 | 135 | −11.8% |
Source: Censuses

== Notable people ==
- Ludwig Winder (1889–1946), Austrian-Czech writer, journalist and literary critic
