= Esther Hoffe =

- אסתר הופה
- Born: 8 May 1906; Troppau, Austrian Silesia, Austria-Hungary (now Opava, Czech Republic)
- Died: 2 September 2007 (aged 101); Tel Aviv, Israel
- Occupation: Secretary
- Spouse: Otto Hoffe

Ilse Esther Hoffe (Hebrew: אסתר הופה; 8 May 1906 – 2 September 2007) was a Jewish woman known for being the secretary and presumed mistress of writer Max Brod. Upon his death in 1968, she received a large trove of materials relating to Franz Kafka, Brod's friend. Some of these were sold but most were controversially passed, unreleased to the public, to her two daughters after her own death. She was born in Troppau (Opava).

== Biography ==
Hoffe and her husband Otto met Max Brod in Israel soon after he had escaped Prague ahead of the Nazi invasion of the rest Czechoslovakia in March 1939. After the death of Brod's wife in 1942, he grew very close to Hoffe. The three took vacations together and Esther became Brod's secretary, with an office in his apartment. The relationship has been described by many who knew them as "ménage à trois", although romantic connections were never publicly acknowledged. Esther's daughter Eva maintained throughout her life that no such relationship existed.

Esther was Brod's caretaker as his health declined, and upon his death in 1968 stewardship of his trove of Kafka materials and his own papers passed to her. Because of differing interpretations of Brod's final wishes, it is not clear if she was a beneficiary who gained ownership of the papers, or an executor responsible for eventually fulfilling Brod's intent to hand the papers over to the National Library of Israel or as he had expressly stated and left to her or the decision of her daughters to the City Library of Tel Aviv or another domestic or international public archive. The unclear nature of Esther's rights did not preclude her from selling some of Kafka's papers. In 1974, approximately 22 letters and 10 postcards from Kafka to Brod were sold in private sales, presumably by Hoffe, to buyers in Germany. The next year, she was arrested at the Tel Aviv airport on suspicion that she was attempting to remove original manuscripts without first filing photocopies with the National Archives, as required by law. Upon search, photocopies of Kafka's letters and purportedly an original diary by Brod were found in her luggage. In 1988, she auctioned at least one more item from the Kafka papers: an original manuscript of The Trial, which brought approximately $2 million.

The rare sales notwithstanding, in the 40 years between Brod's death and her own, Hoffe maintained a close hold on the papers. They were inventoried by an official archivist in the aftermath of her arrest, but this inventory is believed to be very incomplete, especially as many of the papers were out of the country in Swiss bank deposit boxes. A philologist named Bernhard Echte worked with Hoffe in the 1980s and may have produced the most complete inventory, but copies of this are difficult to obtain. After Hoffe's death in 2007, in Tel Aviv, the papers and an estimated $1 million in cash passed to her daughters Eva and Ruth. Ruth Weisler died in 2012. Eva, who lived with her mother for 40 years and had control over the papers until their ownership was assigned to the Israeli National Library in 2016 by a highly controversial court decision, died 4 August 2018.
