= Eli Gorenstein =

Israeli actor

- אלי גורנשטיין
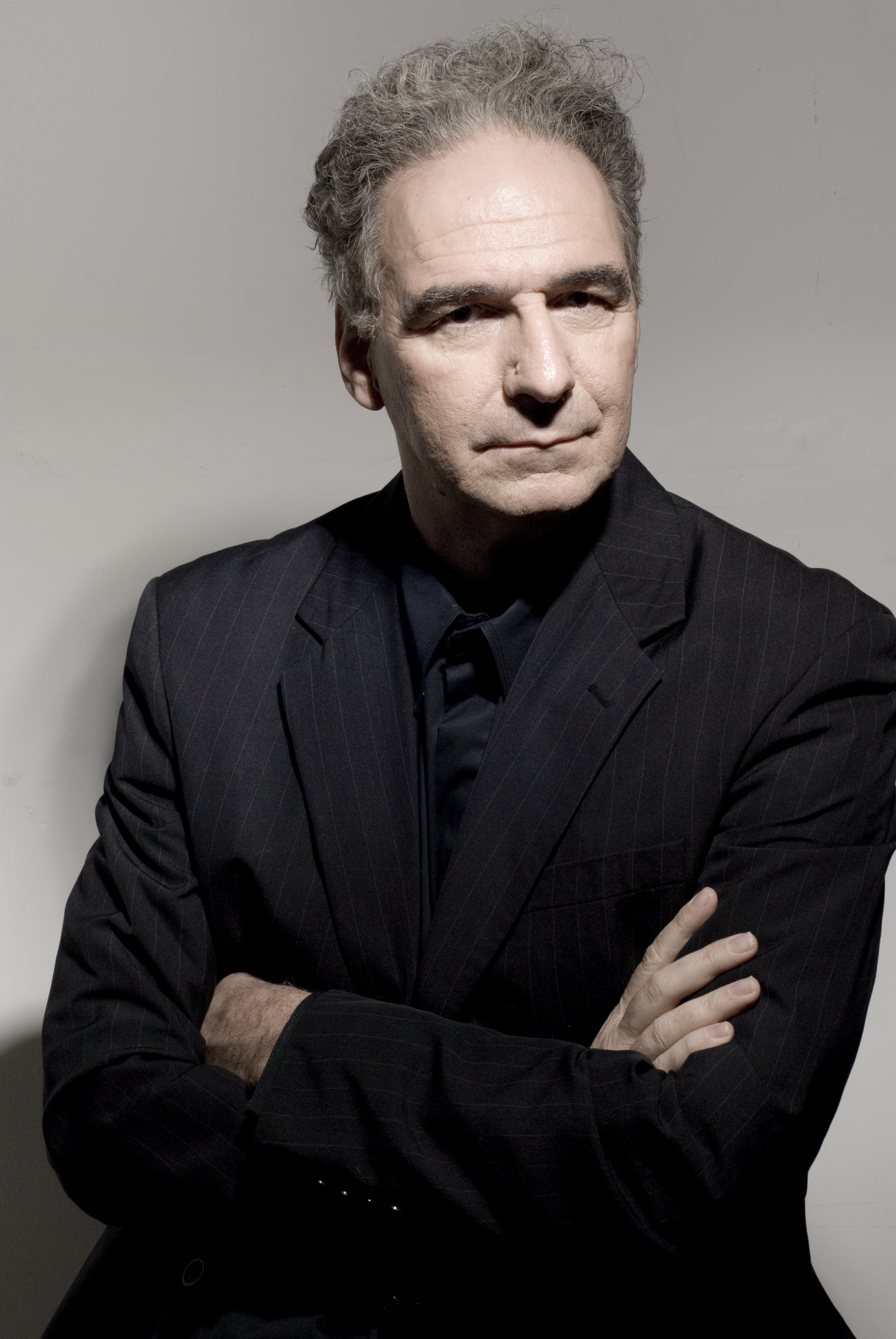
- Born: Eliyahu Gorenstein; 31 August 1952 (age 74); Tel Aviv, Israel
- Occupations: Actor; voice artist; director; singer; cellist
- Years active: 1965–present
- Spouse: Nitza Gorenstein
- Children: 3
- Relatives: Felix Weltsch (grandfather)
- Musical career
- Genres: Opera; jazz; musical theatre
- Instruments: Vocals; cello

Eli Gorenstein (Hebrew: אלי גורנשטיין; born 31 August 1952) is an Israeli actor, voice actor, director, singer and cellist.

== Biography ==
Gorenstein was born in Tel Aviv and raised in Ramat Gan. His maternal grandfather was philosopher Felix Weltsch. He studied theater and music in New York and holds a master's degree from Tel Aviv University.

== Acting and music career ==
He began his career in the 1960s, frequently appearing alongside Zachi Noy. He performed with Habima Theatre and Haifa Theatre, starting in adaptions of Shakespeare plays as well as musicals.

Gorenstein appeared as a guest on children's shows such as Rechov Sumsum (the Israeli production of Sesame Street), Parpar Nechmad and Hachaverim shel Barney (the Israeli production of Barney & Friends).

His movie appearances include the 2007 film Israeli Intelligence and the 2018 film The Awakening of Motti Wolkenbruch. He often appeared on Zehu Ze! and performed alongside Shlomo Gronich.

Gorenstein has also served as a voice actor. He dubbed the Hebrew voices of Disney villains, sidekicks and supporting characters particularly during the Disney Renaissance period. His roles include Scar from The Lion King, Lickboot from Tom and Jerry: The Movie, Frollo from The Hunchback of Notre Dame, Professor Ratigan from The Great Mouse Detective, Jafar from Aladdin, Clayton from Tarzan, Sebastian from The Little Mermaid, Eeyore from the Winnie the Pooh franchise, Lumière from Beauty and the Beast, Dr. Facilier from The Princess and the Frog, Gilderoy Lockhart from Harry Potter and the Chamber of Secrets, The Wolf from Hoodwinked!, Professor Paljas from Alfred J. Kwak, Grimmel from How to Train Your Dragon: The Hidden World and many more. He has frequently collaborated with Rama Messinger, Dov Reiser and Yuval Zamir.

Gorenstein is also a singer and musician. He plays the cello and performs songs in the style of Frank Sinatra. Known for his bass vocal range, he has appeared with the New Israeli Opera and is often hired for commercials. Gorenstein has competed in song festivals such as the Israeli Children’s Songs Festival where he won second place. He also worked with the Israel Chamber Orchestra and the Israel Philharmonic Orchestra.

In 2011, Gorenstein released his debut album, which features the work of artists such as Yoni Rechter, Yehonatan Geffen, Nathan Alterman, Nurit Galron and others. In March 2019, Gorenstein led and participated in the Tel-Aviv University Expert Studential Philharmonic Orchestra for a captivating show, featuring music from Disney movies and The Little Mermaid.

== Personal life ==
Gorenstein is married and has three children. His daughter Roni, is also an actress.

== See also ==
- Thurl Ravenscroft
