= Karl Kreibich (dermatologist) =

Austrian dermatologist

Karl Kreibich (20 May 1869 – 30 December 1932) was an Austrian dermatologist born in Prague.

In 1894 he obtained his doctorate from the German Medical Faculty at Prague, and performed his postgraduate studies in Vienna. At Vienna he spent six years as an assistant to dermatologist Moritz Kaposi (1837-1902). In 1903 he succeeded Adolf Jarisch (1850–1902) as head of the dermatology clinic at the University of Graz, and later on, succeeded Philipp Josef Pick (1834-1910) as professor of dermatology at the German University in Prague, where in 1923 he was appointed rector.

Among his numerous written works was a textbook on skin diseases titled "Lehrbuch der hautkrankheiten", and three papers on lupus pernio. In 1904 he provided the first description of bone cysts in sarcoidosis.

== Published works ==
- Lehrbuch der hautkrankheiten, 1904 – Textbook of skin diseases.
- Ueber lupus pernio. Arch Dermatol Syph (Wien) 1904; 71:3–12.
- Die Angioneurotische Entzundung, 1905 – The angioneurotic inflammation.
