= Demographics of Bratislava =

Below is an overview to the demographics of Bratislava, the capital city of Slovakia.

== Population ==
Historical population
Year	Pop.	±%
1950	194,225	—
1955	215,232	+10.8%
1960	238,519	+10.8%
1965	259,714	+8.9%
1970	282,043	+8.6%
1975	324,985	+15.2%
1980	376,517	+15.9%
1985	406,720	+8.0%
1990	437,146	+7.5%
1995	435,969	−0.3%
2000	429,777	−1.4%
2005	425,808	−0.9%
2011	411,228	−3.4%
2021	475,503	+15.6%

As of 2024, about 475,000 residents are registered in Bratislava. However, the city claims that thousands of unregistered inhabitants bring the actual population to over 500,000. The average population density is 1,297 inhabitants per square kilometer (3,360/sq mi).

The most populous borough is Petržalka, with about 113,000 inhabitants, followed by Ružinov with 82,000 residents.

== Nationality ==
From the 13th century until the 19th century, German speakers were the dominant ethnic group. However, after the Compromise of 1867, the government encouraged Magyarization and, by the end of World War I, Bratislava was predominantly made up of German and Hungarian speakers, with Slovaks as the largest minority. While a minority, Jews from German and Hungarian-speaking areas contributed much to the intellectual culture of the city. Interpretation of census results is complicated, since before 1918, language was used as census criterion, and after 1918, self-identified ethnicity.

In addition, as Bratislava since 1918 has enlarged its territory several times, a more accurate assessment of early demographics might take into account the formerly independent communities (Dúbravka, Lamač, Rača, etc.), which were mostly Slovak. An alternative would be to compare only those districts which officially belonged to the city in the time of a given census. Moreover, residents of mixed origin tended to identify with the dominant political group, such as Hungarian before 1918, and Slovak after 1918; that is, what would be the most suitable or least dangerous identity. For example, the proportion of ethnic Hungarians appeared to increase from 7.5% in 1850 to 40.53% in 1910. It is more likely that people of mixed backgrounds identified with the one in power. Similarly, the apparent population of Slovaks "jumped" from 14.42% in 1910 to 33% in 1919, but this may have reflected changing self-identification, rather than an exchange of peoples. Many people were bi- or trilingual and multicultural. Because of the pressure of Magyarisation, at one time Slovaks identified or presented themselves as ethnic Hungarians.

After the formation of the Czechoslovak Republic in 1918, Bratislava remained a multiethnic city, but with a different demographic trend. After active Slovakization, the proportion of Slovaks and Czechs increased, while the proportion of Germans and Hungarians fell. With the shift in government, many of the largely Hungarian former government employees emigrated. Czechs and Slovaks immigrated to the city to take their places in jobs. In 1938, 59% of population were Slovaks or Czechs, while Germans represented 22% and Hungarians 13% of the city's population.

The creation of the first Slovak Republic in 1939 brought other changes, most notably the expulsion of many Czechs and Jews under Nazi influence, with the deportation of Jews continuing in the early 1940s, leading to most of the 15,000 from Bratislava being killed or dying from maltreatment in German concentration camps. In 1945, most of the ethnic Germans were expelled. After the restoration of Czechoslovakia, the Beneš decrees collectively punished ethnic German and Hungarian minorities by expropriation and deportation to Germany, Austria, and Hungary for their alleged collaboration with Nazi Germany and Hungary against Czechoslovakia.

This was part of a postwar population transfer approved by the Allies, with the thought of reducing future tensions. Ethnic Germans were expelled from across eastern Europe. The stripping of Slovak citizenship from the Hungarian and German ethnics also forced the minorities to leave the city. Also, Hungary and Slovakia made population exchanges, which further decreased the number of the Hungarians in the city. The city utterly lost its multicultural character and much of its vitality. Since the 1950s, the Slovaks have been the dominant ethnicity in the town, making up around 90% of the city's population.

Development of the ethnic composition of Bratislava (within the borders of the city in the current year):
Year	Slovaks	Czechs	Germans	Hungarians	Jews
1850	18%	?	75%	7.5%	?
1880	8%	?	68%	8%	16%
1890	16%	?	59.9%	19.9%	?
1910	14.92%	?	41.92%	40.53%	?
1919	33%	?	36%	29%	?
1930	33%	23%	25%	16%	3.83%^{1}
1940	49%	?	20%	9.53%	8.78%
1950	90.2%	?	0.6%	3.5%	?
1961	95.15%	4.61%	0.52%	3.44%	0%
1970	92%	4.6%	0.5%	3.4%	0%
1991	93.39%	2.47%	0.29%	4.6%	0%
2001	91.39%	2%	0.28%	3.84%	0%
2021	89.81%	1.06%	0.16%	2.35%	0%
^{1} Of the 12% of the population that declared a Jewish religion, only this percentage declared a Jewish nationality along it.

By the late 2010s, Bratislava became an increasingly popular immigration destination, predominantly from Balkans and former USSR countries. In the 2021 census, the share of people who did not consider themselves of any traditional ethnic group rose to nearly 10%. The immigrant population has been further boosted in 2022 by the refugees fleeing the 2022 Russian invasion of Ukraine, around 11,000 of whom settled in Bratislava.

There is also a Romani (Gypsy) community in the city.

== Age ==
According to a 2021 census, the average age in the city was 42.6 years. The distribution in 2021 was as follows: 51,783 inhabitants of pre-productive age (0–14), 12.1%; 281,403 of productive age (15–59), 65.6%; and 92,273 of post-productive age (55+ for females, 60+ for males), 21.5%.

== Religion ==
According to the 2021 census, 44% of Bratislava inhabitants had no religion, 41% were Roman Catholic and 4% Lutheran.
