= Johannes Urzidil =

German-Bohemian writer, poet and historian

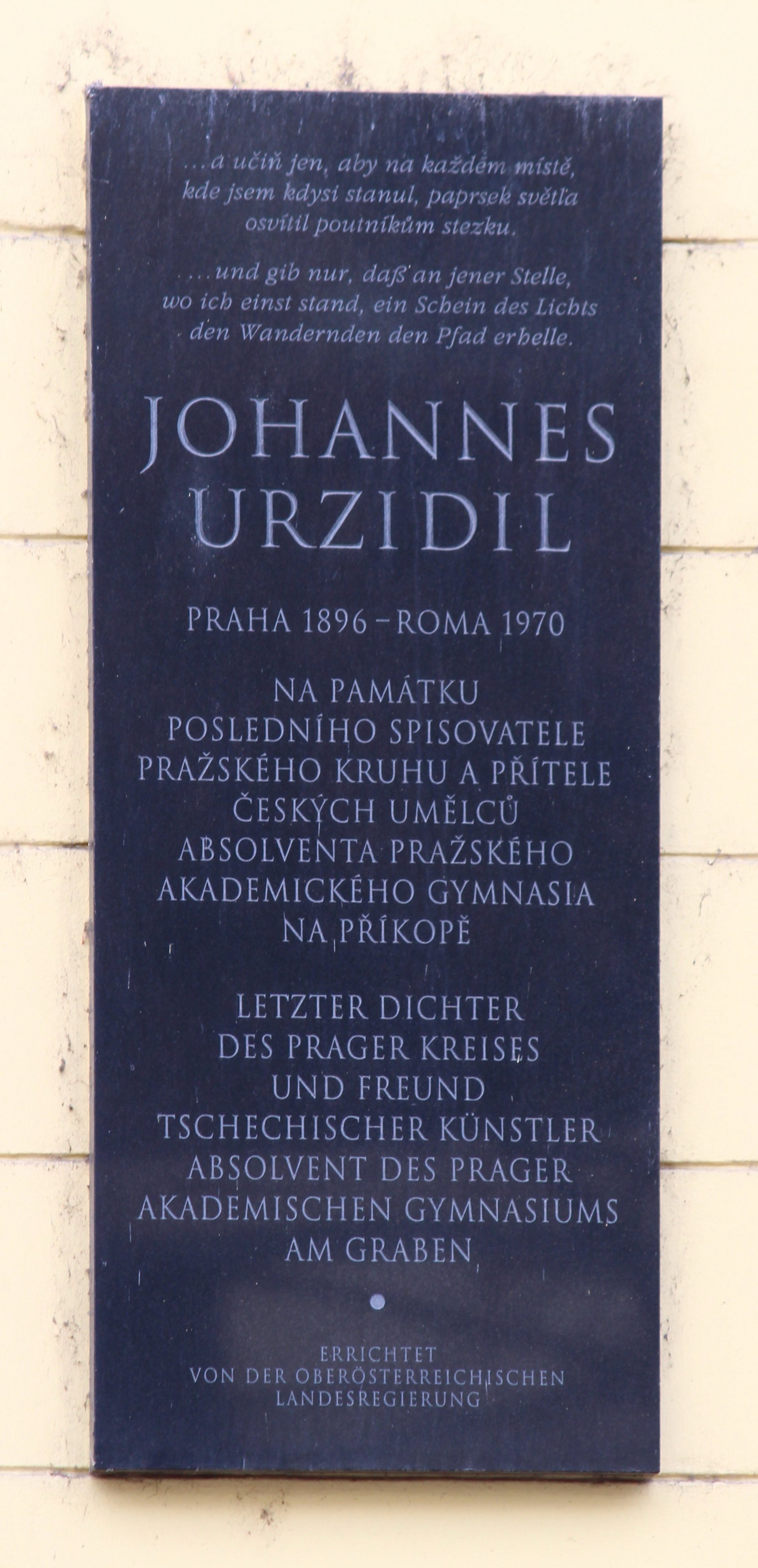
Memorial plaque in Na Příkopě street, Prague (former Deutsches Staatsgymnasium)

Johannes Urzidil (3 February 1896 – 2 November 1970) was a German-Bohemian writer, poet and historian. His father was German Bohemian and his mother was Jewish.

== Life ==
Urzidil was born on 3 February 1896 in Prague. He was educated in Prague, studying German, art history, and Slavic languages before turning to journalism and writing. His initial efforts in poetry were influenced by Expressionism, and were published under the pseudonym Hans Elmar. He also worked as a writer and editor of the monthly journal Der Mensch. Among his acquaintances during this period were Franz Werfel, Ludwig Winder and Franz Kafka. From 1922 until 1933, he advised the press section of the German embassy in Prague.

When Czechoslovakia was occupied by Nazi Germany in 1939, he was dismissed from employment by the German embassy because of his being "Halbjude" ("half-Jewish", a Nazi designation) and this situation caused Urzidil to emigrate to Great Britain. There he was financially supported by the British writer Bryher. In 1941 he and his wife, the poet Gertrude Urzidil, came to the United States, acquiring American citizenship in 1946.

Urzidil died in Rome on 2 November 1970.

== Works ==
Although he published poetry, Urzidil is best known for his prose which, though written in exile, reflects his Bohemian heritage just as well as his new American environment. Among his more notable works are the story Der Trauermantel (1945, Trauermantel is the German name of the Camberwell beauty) about Adalbert Stifter′s youth, and his collections of short stories like The Lost Beloved (1956; the title refers as well to Prague which he had to leave behind when the Nazis occupied Czechoslovakia as to his first love), Prague Triptych (1960, whose composition is derived from that of an altarpiece), or Kidnapping and Seven Other Incidents (1964, whose eight stories are situated in the USA). Urzidil's only novel The Great Hallelujah (1959) shows as literary collage in the tradition of John Dos Passos, Thomas Wolfe, and Alfred Döblin a manifold panorama of the United States as he experienced them since his arrival in 1941.

He wrote also books and essays about cultural history, e. g. The Fortune of Presence. Goethe's View of America (1958), America and the Ancient World (1964), and There Goes Kafka (1965, enlarged 1966), or monographs about artists and poets he admired, such as Hollar, a Czech émigré in England (1942, revised and abridged translation of his German book Wenceslaus Hollar - the Engraver of the Baroque Era, 1936), or his opus magnum in this genre Goethe in Bohemia (1932, revised and enlarged 1962 and 1965). More over Urzidil translated texts and books from Czech and English into German; worth mentioning is especially his translation (1955) of By Avon River (1949) by the American poet H.D., the companion of Urzidil's life-saver Bryher.

== Awards ==
Urzidil won a number of prizes in his career, including the Charles Veillon Prize (1957) and the Großer Österreichischer Staatspreis (1964).

== Legacy ==
The main-belt asteroid 70679 Urzidil is named after Urzidil.
