= Felix Weltsch =

German-Israeli philosopher and journalist (1884–1964)

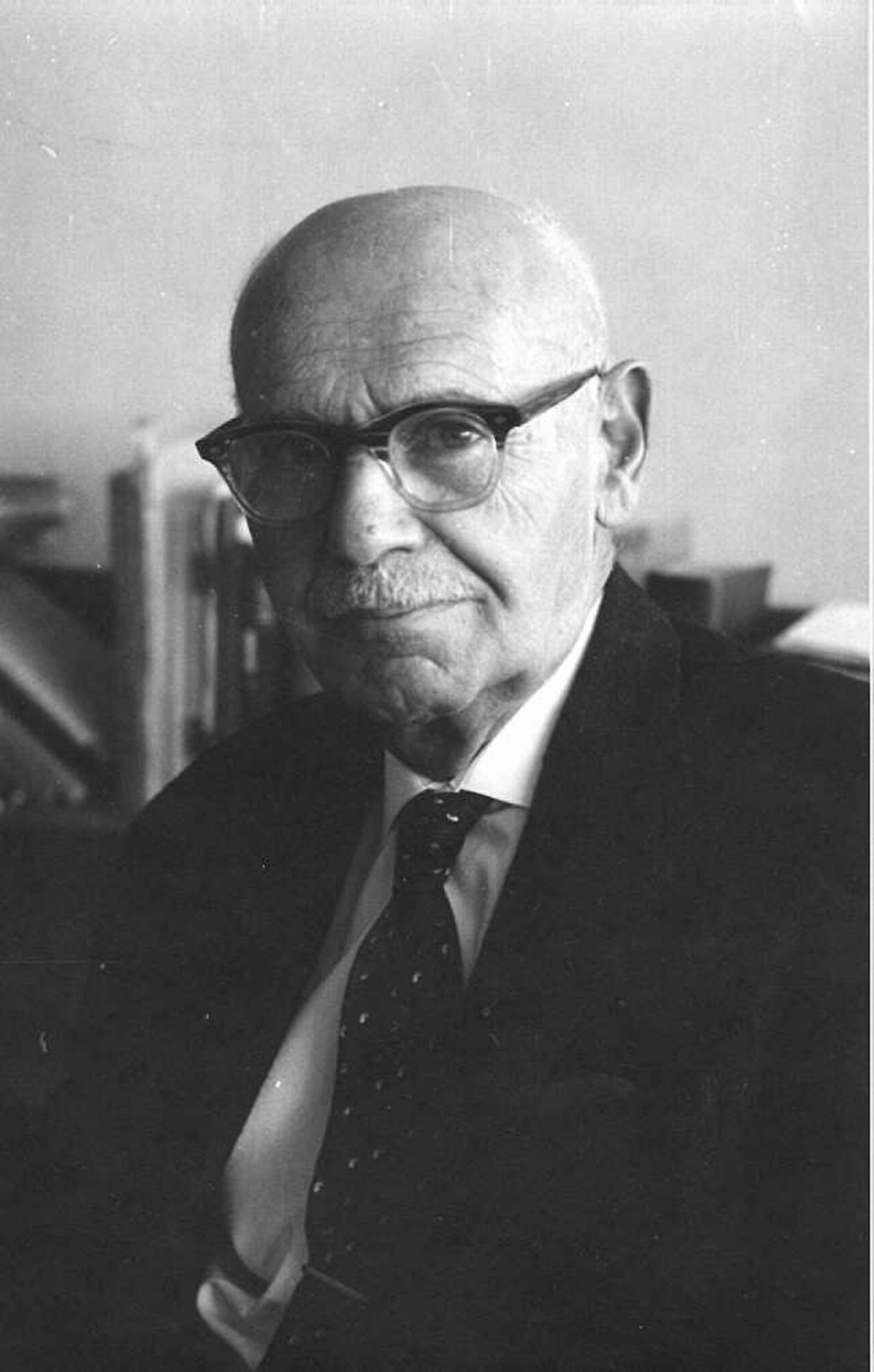
Felix Weltsch (between 1939 and 1950)

Felix Weltsch (Hebrew: 'פליקס וולצ; 6 October 1884 – 9 November 1964) was a German-speaking Jewish librarian, philosopher, author, editor, publisher and journalist. A close friend of Max Brod, Ludwig Winder and Franz Kafka, he was one of the most important Zionists in Bohemia.

== Biography ==
Born in Prague (then in Austria-Hungary), Weltsch studied Law and Philosophy at the Charles University. He lived and worked in Prague until 15 March 1939, and left the city with Max Brod and his family on the last train out of Czechoslovakia. He worked as a librarian in Jerusalem until his death in 1964.

He had one daughter, Ruth Weltsch (1920–1991), with his wife Irma Herz (1892–1969). They married in August 1914. The publisher, journalist and Zionist Robert Weltsch was Felix Weltsch's cousin, and the Prague-born concert pianist Alice Herz-Sommer, who performed in and survived Theresienstadt at her death the world's oldest Holocaust survivor, was his sister-in-law. His grandson, Eli Gorenstein is an actor, cellist and among Israel's leading voice dubbers.

== Influence ==
Weltsch's works deal with the subjects of Ethics, Politics and Philosophy. For his ethical and political publications he received the Ruppin-Prize from the city of Haifa in 1952. His most important work was the Jewish-Zionist weekly paper Selbstwehr (self-defense), which he led from 1919 until 1938. With this work and hundreds of articles he became one of the most important personalities in Jewish life next to Martin Buber, Chaim Weizmann and Hugo Bergmann, his early school friend.

== Works ==
- Anschauung und Begriff, 1913 (Co-author, Max Brod)
- Organische Demokratie, 1918
- Gnade und Freiheit. Untersuchungen zum Problem des schöpferischen Willens in Religion und Ethik, Munich 1920
- Nationalismus und Judentum, Berlin 1920
- Zionismus als Weltanschauung, Jerusalem 1925 (Co-author, Max Brod)
- Judenfrage und Zionismus, 1929
- Antisemitismus als Völkerhysterie, 1931
- Thesen des Nationalhumanismus, 1934
- Das Rätsel des Lachens, 1935
- Das Wagnis der Mitte, 1937
- Die Dialektik des Leidens (Ha-Di’alektikah shel ha-Sevel), 1944
- Natur, Moral und Politik (Teva, Musar u-Mediniyyut), 1950
- Religion und Humor im Leben und Werk Franz Kafkas, 1957

=== Articles ===
- The rise and fall of the Jewish-German symbiosis : the case of Franz Kafka / by Felix Weltsch. Year book I of the Leo Baeck institute of Jews from Germany, London, 1956.
