= Max Brod =

Czech-Israeli author, composer, and journalist (1884–1968)

- מקס ברוד
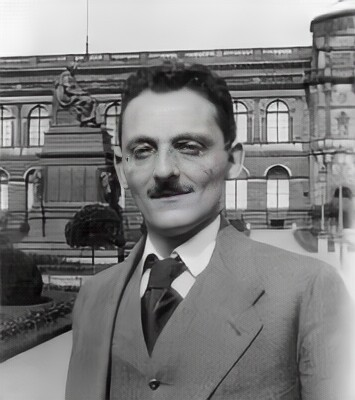
- Brod in 1914
- Born: 27 May 1884; Prague, Bohemia, Austria-Hungary
- Died: 20 December 1968 (aged 84); Tel Aviv, Israel
- Citizenship: Austria-Hungary, Czechoslovakia, Israel
- Education: German Charles-Ferdinand University in Prague
- Occupations: Author, composer, journalist
- Spouse: Elsa Taussig (m. 1913; died 1942)

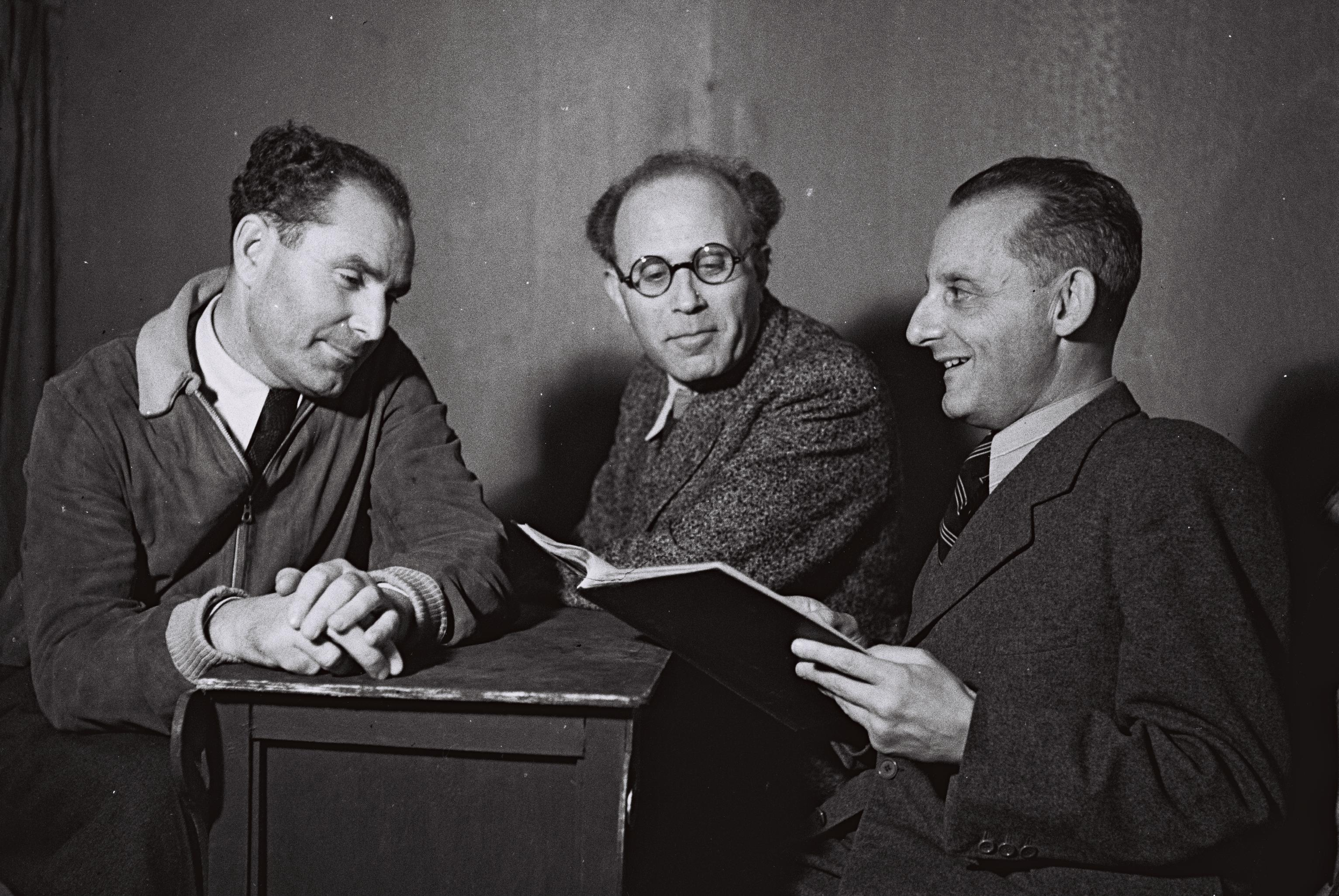
Brod (right) with stage directors of the Habima theatre in Tel Aviv, 1942

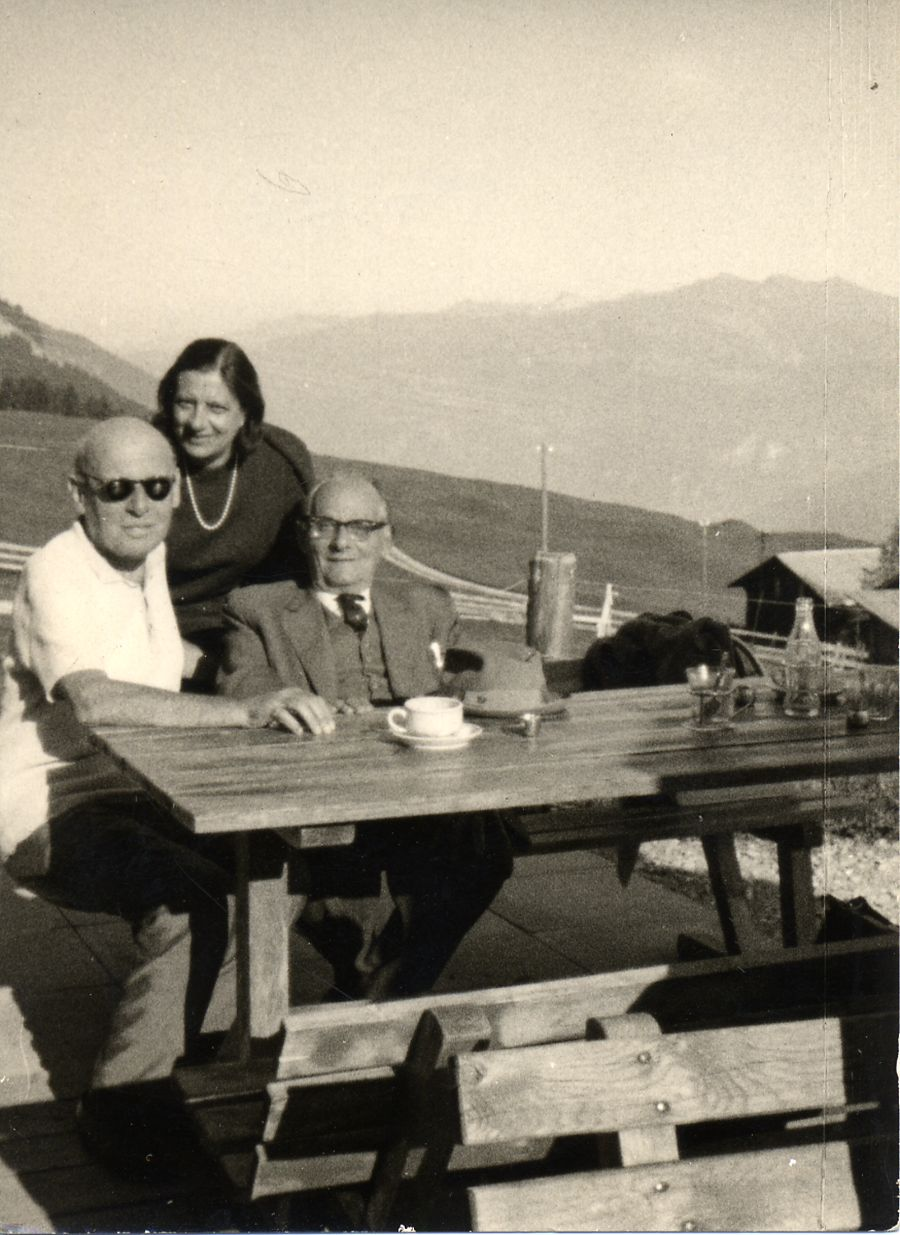
Max Brod (right) with Paul Ben-Haim and his wife

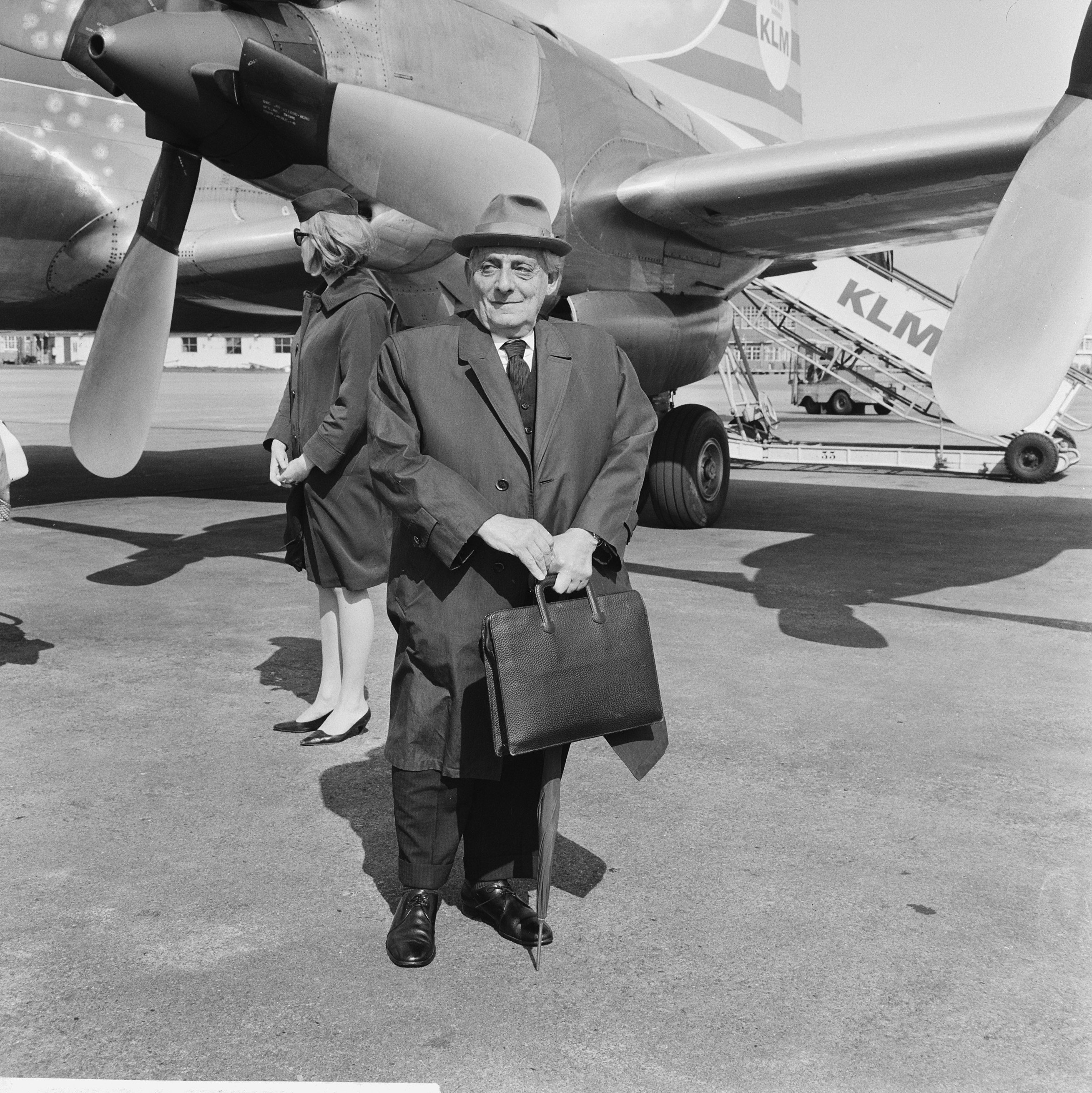
Brod at the Schiphol airport in the Netherlands, 1965

Max Brod (Hebrew: מקס ברוד; 27 May 1884 – 20 December 1968) was an Israeli author, music critic, composer, and journalist, born as a German-speaking Czech. He is notable for promoting the work of writer Franz Kafka and composer Leoš Janáček.

Although he was a prolific writer in his own right, he is best remembered as the friend and biographer of Franz Kafka. Kafka named Brod as his literary executor, instructing Brod to burn his unpublished work upon his death. Brod refused and had Kafka's works published instead.

In 1939, as the Nazis occupied Prague, he immigrated to Mandatory Palestine, taking with him a suitcase of Kafka's papers, many of them unpublished notes, diaries, and sketches.

== Biography ==
Max Brod was born in Prague in Bohemia, Austria-Hungary (now the Czech Republic). At the age of four, Brod was diagnosed with a severe spinal curvature and spent a year in corrective harness; despite this he would be a hunchback his entire life. A German-speaking Jew, he attended the Piarist school together with his lifelong friend Felix Weltsch, later attended the Stephans Gymnasium, then studied law at the German Charles-Ferdinand University (which at the time was divided into a German and a Czech language university; he attended the German-speaking institution) and graduated in 1907 to work in the civil service. From 1912, he was a pronounced Zionist (which he attributed to the influence of Martin Buber) and when Czechoslovakia became independent in 1918, he briefly served as vice-president of the Jüdischer Nationalrat. From 1924, already an established writer, he worked as a critic for the Prager Tagblatt.

In 1939, as the Nazis took over Prague, Brod and his wife Elsa Taussig fled to Mandatory Palestine. He settled in Tel Aviv, where he continued to write and worked as a dramaturg for Habimah, later the Israeli national theatre, for 30 years. For a period following the death of his wife in 1942, Brod published very few works. He became very close to a couple named Otto and Esther Hoffe, regularly taking vacations with the couple and employed Esther as a secretary for many years; it is often presumed that their relationship had a romantic dimension. He would later pass stewardship of the Kafka materials in his possession to Esther in his will.

Another close companion was Felix Weltsch. Their friendship lasted 75 years, from the elementary school of the Piarists in Prague to Weltsch's death in 1964. He increasingly devoted himself to music, traveling to Europe to give lectures and to encourage young artists. Brod was also close to Israeli author Aharon Megged, with whom he had many philosophical discussions as they walked along the beachfront in Tel Aviv.

Brod died on 20 December 1968 in Tel Aviv; his final resting place is the Trumpeldor Cemetery in Tel Aviv.

== Literary career ==
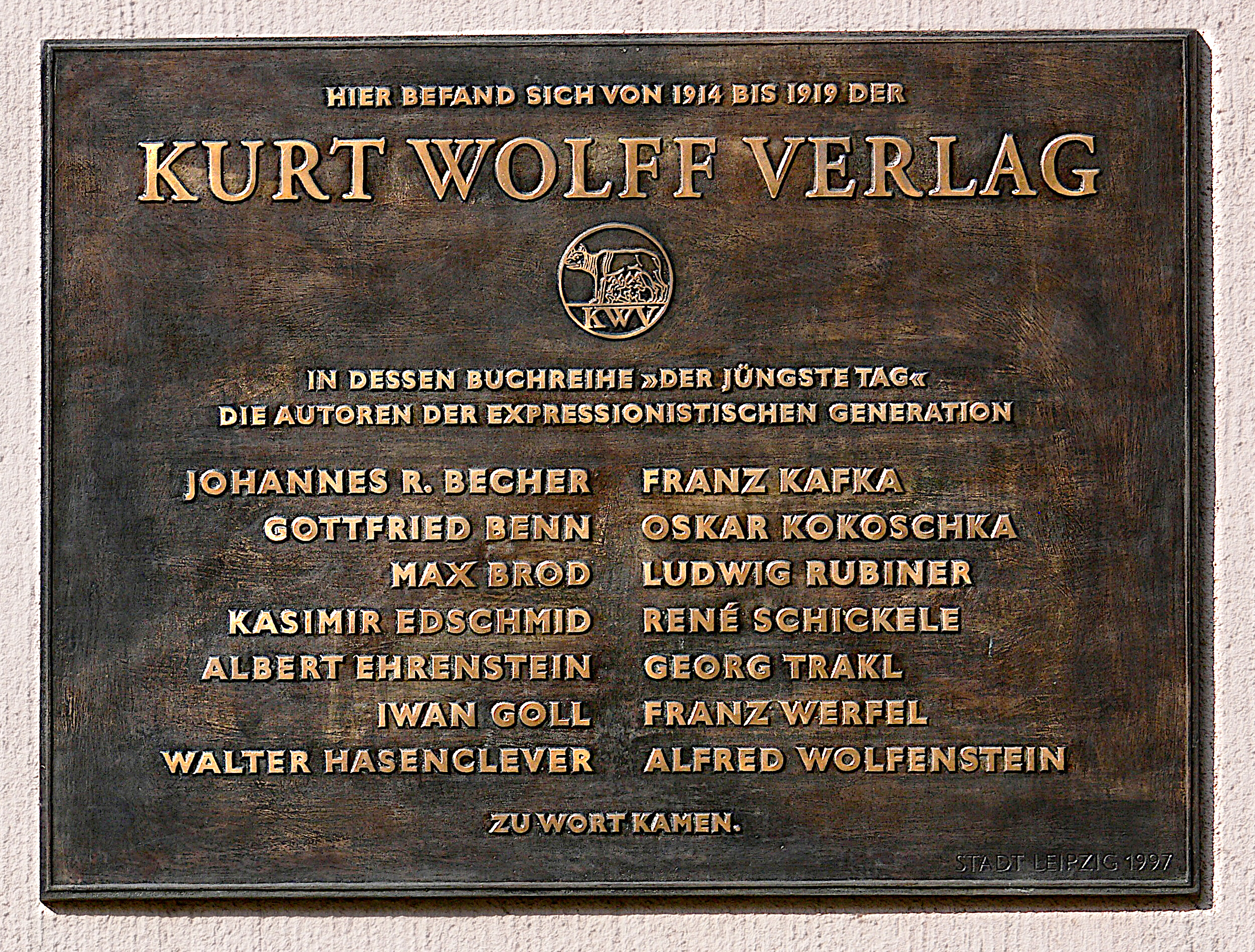
Memorial Plaque in Leipzig. Kurt Wolff and his authors.

Unlike Kafka, Brod rapidly became a prolific author who eventually published 83 titles. His first novel and fourth book overall, Schloss Nornepygge (Nornepygge Castle), published in 1908 when he was only 24, was celebrated in Berlin literary circles as a masterpiece of expressionism. This and other works made Brod a well-known personality in German-language literature. In 1913, together with Weltsch, he published the work Anschauung und Begriff which made him better known in Berlin and also in Leipzig, where their publisher Kurt Wolff worked.

Brod was supportive of other writers and musicians. Among his protégés was Franz Werfel, whom he would later fall out with as Werfel abandoned Judaism for Christianity. He would also write at various times both for and against Karl Kraus, a convert from Judaism to Roman Catholicism. His critical endorsement would be crucial to the success of Jaroslav Hašek's The Good Soldier Svejk, and he played a crucial role in the diffusion of Leoš Janáček's operas.

== Friendship with Kafka ==
Brod first met Kafka on 23 October 1902, when they were students at Charles University. Brod had given a lecture on Arthur Schopenhauer at the German students' hall. Kafka, one year older, addressed him after the lecture and accompanied him home. "He tended to participate in all the meetings, but up to then we had hardly considered each other," wrote Brod. The quiet Kafka "would have been ... hard to notice ... even his elegant, usually dark-blue, suits were inconspicuous and reserved like him. At that time, however, something seems to have attracted him to me, he was more open than usual, filling the endless walk home by disagreeing strongly with my all too rough formulations."

From then on, Brod and Kafka met frequently, often even daily, and remained close friends until Kafka's death. Kafka was a frequent guest in Brod's parents' house. There he met his future girlfriend and fiancée Felice Bauer, cousin of Brod's brother-in-law Max Friedmann. After graduating, Brod worked for some time at the post office. The relatively short working hours gave him time to begin a career as an art critic and freelance writer. For similar reasons, Kafka took a job at an insurance agency involved in workmen's accident insurance. Brod, Kafka, and Brod's close friend Felix Weltsch constituted the so-called "enge Prager Kreis" or "close Prague circle".

During Kafka's lifetime, Brod tried repeatedly to reassure him of his writing talents, of which Kafka was chronically doubtful. Brod pushed Kafka to publish his work, and it is probably owing to Brod that he began to keep a diary. Brod tried, but failed, to arrange common literary projects. Notwithstanding their inability to write in tandem – which stemmed from clashing literary and personal philosophies – they were able to publish one chapter from an attempted travelogue in May 1912, for which Kafka wrote the introduction. It was published in the journal Herderblätter. Brod prodded his friend to complete the project several years later, but the effort was in vain. Even after Brod's 1913 marriage with Elsa Taussig, he and Kafka remained each other's closest friends and confidants, assisting each other in problems and life crises.

== Publication of Kafka's work ==
On Kafka's death in 1924, Brod was the administrator of the estate. Although Kafka stipulated that all of his unpublished works were to be burned, Brod refused. He justified this move by stating that when Kafka personally told him to burn his unpublished work, Brod replied that he would outright refuse, and that "Franz should have appointed another executor if he had been absolutely and finally determined that his instructions should stand." Before even a line of Kafka's most celebrated works had been made public, Brod had already praised him as "the greatest poet of our time", ranking with Goethe or Tolstoy. As Kafka's works were posthumously published (The Trial arrived in 1925, followed by The Castle in 1926 and Amerika in 1927), this early positive assessment was bolstered by more general critical acclaim.

When Brod fled Prague in 1939, he took with him a suitcase of Kafka's papers, many of them unpublished notes, diaries, and sketches. Although some of these materials were later edited and published in 6 volumes of collected works, much of them remained unreleased. In 1961, at the request of Kafka's heirs (the daughters of his sisters), approximately two-thirds of Kafka's papers were given to the Bodleian Library, at the University of Oxford. The rest of the papers remained integrated within Brod's literary estate. Upon his death, this trove of materials was passed to Esther Hoffe, who maintained most of them until her own death in 2007 (one original manuscript of The Trial was auctioned in 1988 for $2 million). Due to certain ambiguities regarding Brod's wishes, the proper disposition of the materials was litigated. On one side was the National Library of Israel, which argued that Brod passed his literary estate (and Kafka's papers) to Esther as an executor of his actual intent to have the papers donated to the institution. On the other side were Esther's daughters, who claimed that Brod passed the papers to their mother as a pure inheritance which should be theirs. The sisters had announced their intention to sell the materials to the Museum of Modern Literature in Marbach, Germany, but the Supreme Court of Israel ruled in favor of the National Library of Israel.

== Music ==
Brod's musical compositions are little known. They include songs, works for piano, and incidental music for his plays.

He is better known, as a music critic, for helping bring composer Leoš Janáček to public attention by giving an opera of his a highly favourable review in a Berlin newspaper, translating some of his operas into German, and writing the first book on Janáček (first published in Czech in 1924).

Brod also translated some of Bedřich Smetana's operas into German. He authored a study of Gustav Mahler, Beispiel einer deutsch-jüdischen Symbiose, in 1961.

Brod had studied orchestration under Alexander Uriah Boskovich. His book Die Musik Israels, first published in 1951, which introduced the term "Musica Yam-tikhonit" (Mediterranean music) to define a prominent style in Israeli concert music of the era, shortly before Boskovich published essays which provided an extended definition of this style.

== Awards and recognition ==
In 1948, Brod was awarded the Bialik Prize for literature. In 1965, Brod was awarded the Honor Gift of the Heinrich Heine Society in Düsseldorf, Germany. In 1965, he was awarded the Austrian Decoration for Science and Art and was the first Israeli citizen to be awarded it.

== Published works ==
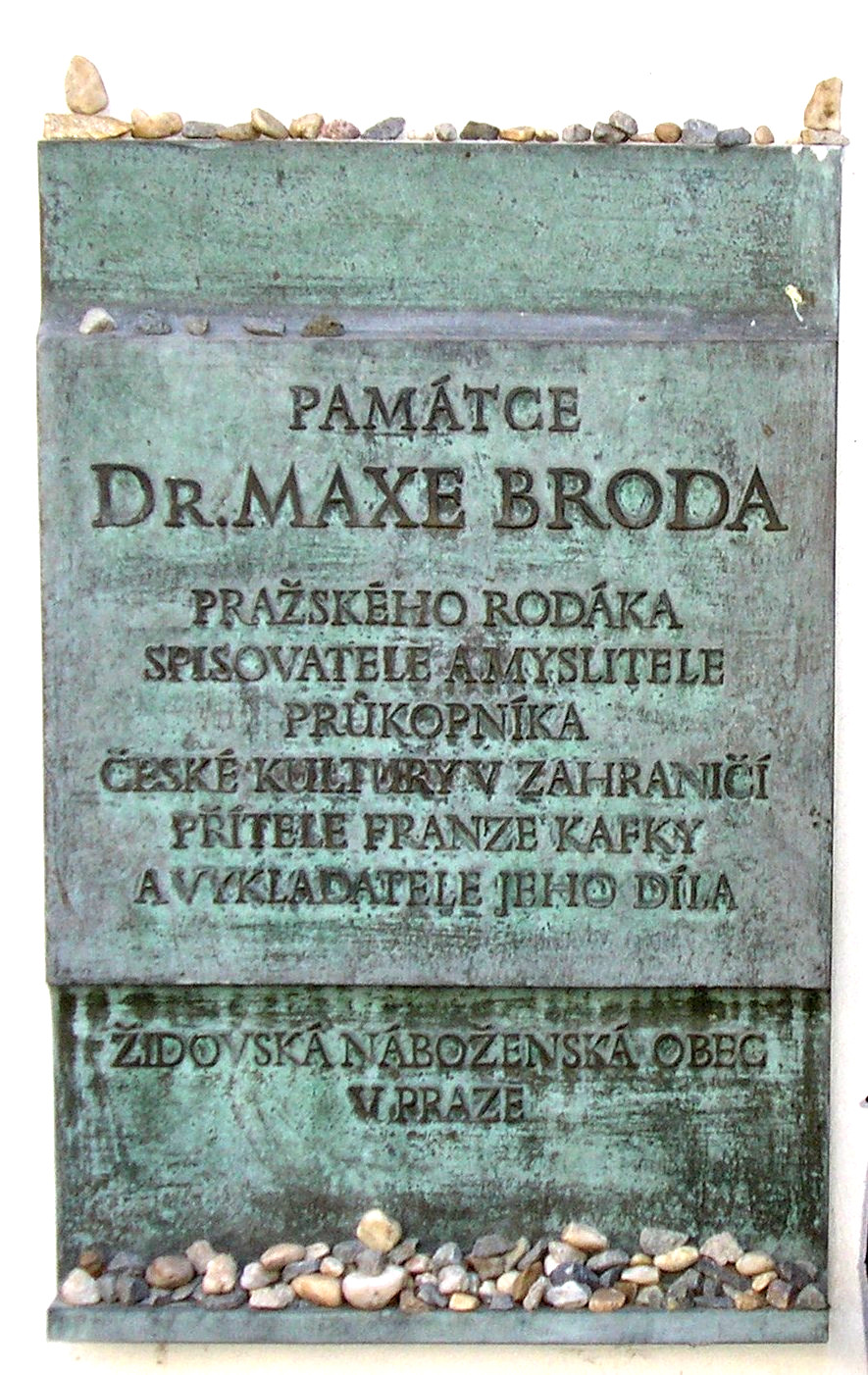
Plaque commemorating Max Brod, next to the grave of Franz Kafka, in Prague

- Schloß Nornepygge (Nornepygge Castle, 1908)
- Weiberwirtschaft (Woman's Work, 1913)
- Über die Schönheit häßlicher Bilder (On the Beauty of Ugly Pictures, 1913)
- Die Höhe des Gefühls (The Height of Feeling, 1913)
- Anschauung und Begriff: Grundzüge eines Systems der Begriffsbildung, 1913 (together with Felix Weltsch)
- Tycho Brahes Weg zu Gott (Tycho Brahe's Path to God 1915)
- Heidentum, Christentum, Judentum: Ein Bekenntnisbuch (Paganism, Christianity, Judaism: A Credo, 1921)
- Sternenhimmel: Musik- und Theatererlebnisse (1923, reissued as Prager Sternenhimmel)
- Reubeni, Fürst der Juden (Reubeni, Prince of the Jews, 1925)
- Zauberreich der Liebe (The Charmed Realm of Love, 1930)
- Biografie von Heinrich Heine (Biography of Heinrich Heine, 1934). Published in English in 1957 in a revised version translated by Joseph Witriol and titled Heinrich Heine: The Artist in Revolt.
- Die Frau, die nicht enttäuscht (The Woman Who Does Not Disappoint, 1934)
- Novellen aus Böhmen (Novellas from Bohemia, 1936)
- Rassentheorie und Judentum (Race Theory and Judaism, 1936)
- Annerl (Annie, 1937)
- Franz Kafka, eine Biographie (Franz Kafka, a Biography, 1937, later collected in Über Franz Kafka, 1974)
- Franz Kafkas Glauben und Lehre (Franz Kafka's Thought and Teaching, 1948)
- Die Musik Israels (The Music of Israel, Tel Aviv, 1951; second edition, with Yehuda W. Cohen, 1976)
- Beinahe ein Vorzugsschüler, oder pièce touchée: Roman eines unauffälligen Menschen (Almost a Gifted Pupil, 1952)
- Die Frau, nach der man sich sehnt (The Woman For Whom One Longs, 1953)
- Rebellische Herzen (Rebellious Hearts, 1957)
- Verzweiflung und Erlösung im Werke Franz Kafkas (Despair and Redemption in the Works of Franz Kafka, 1959)
- Beispiel einer deutsch-jüdischen Symbiose (An Example of German-Jewish Symbiosis, 1961)
- Johannes Reuchlin und sein Kampf (Eine Historische Monographie, 1965)
- Der Prager Kreis (The Prague Circle, 1966)
- Die verkaufte Braut, translation of the Czech libretto of Prodaná nevěsta (The Bartered Bride, a comic opera by Bedřich Smetana), and numerous other translations of Czech opera libretti
- Über Franz Kafka, (Fischer, Frankfurt am Main, 1974)

== Selected filmography ==
- The Woman One Longs For (1929)

== See also ==
- Exilliteratur
- List of Austrian writers
- List of Bialik Prize recipients
