= List of works by Erich Mendelsohn =

List of works by the German architect Erich Mendelsohn.

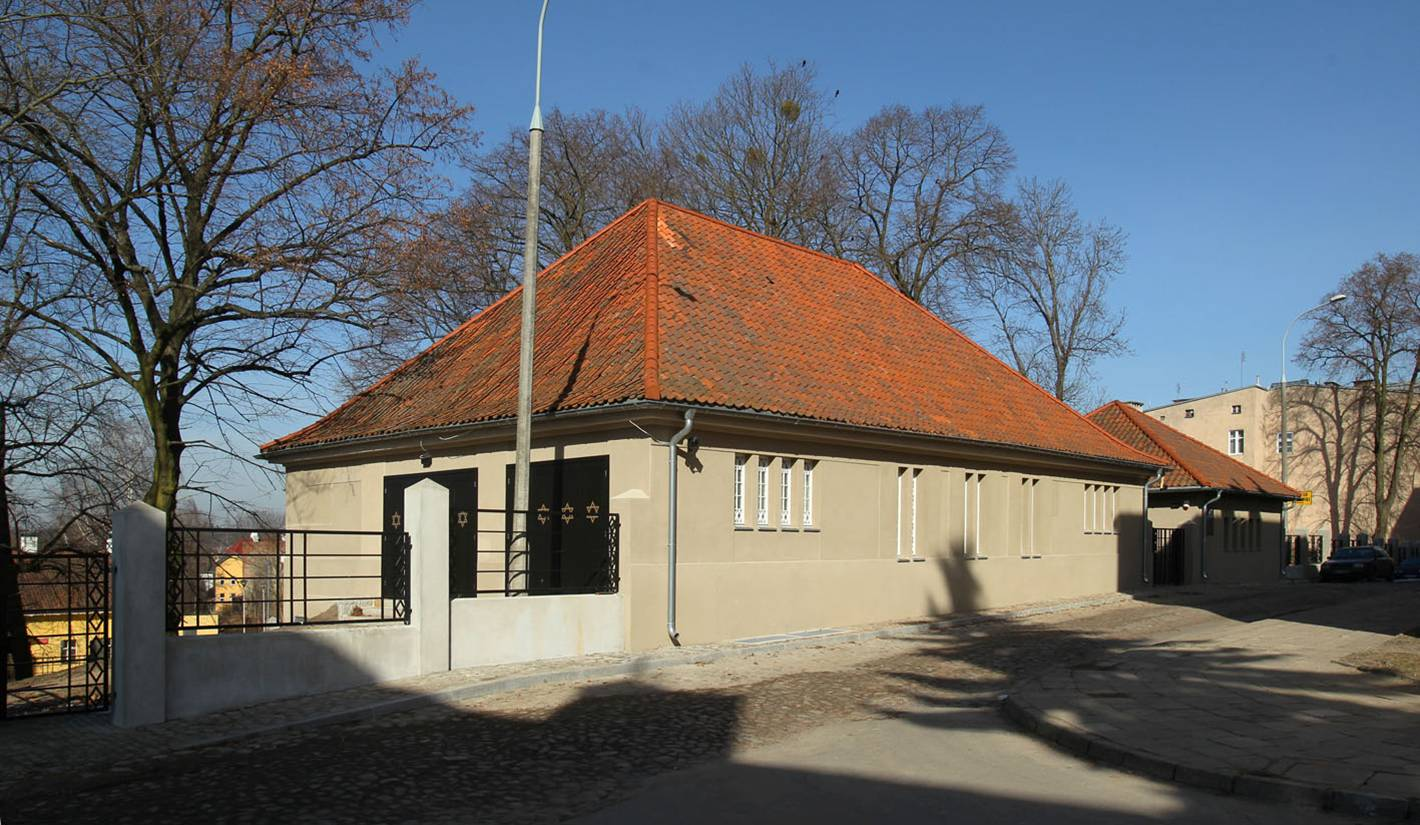
Outside view of the Taharah Building in Allenstein (Olsztyn)

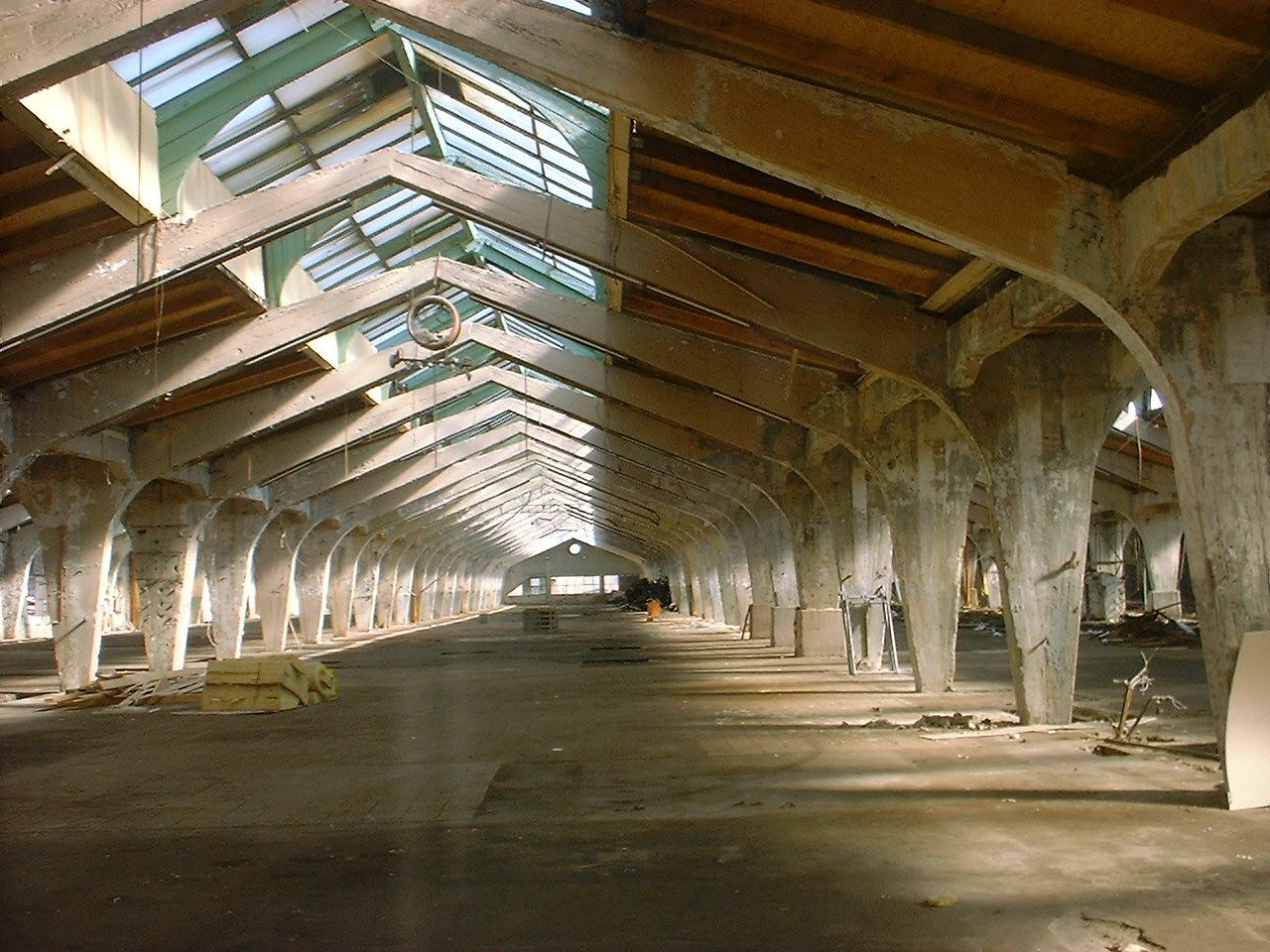
Inner view of the Hat Factory in Luckenwalde

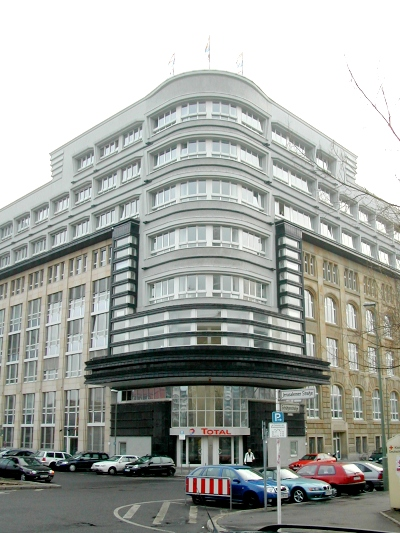
Mossehaus in Berlin

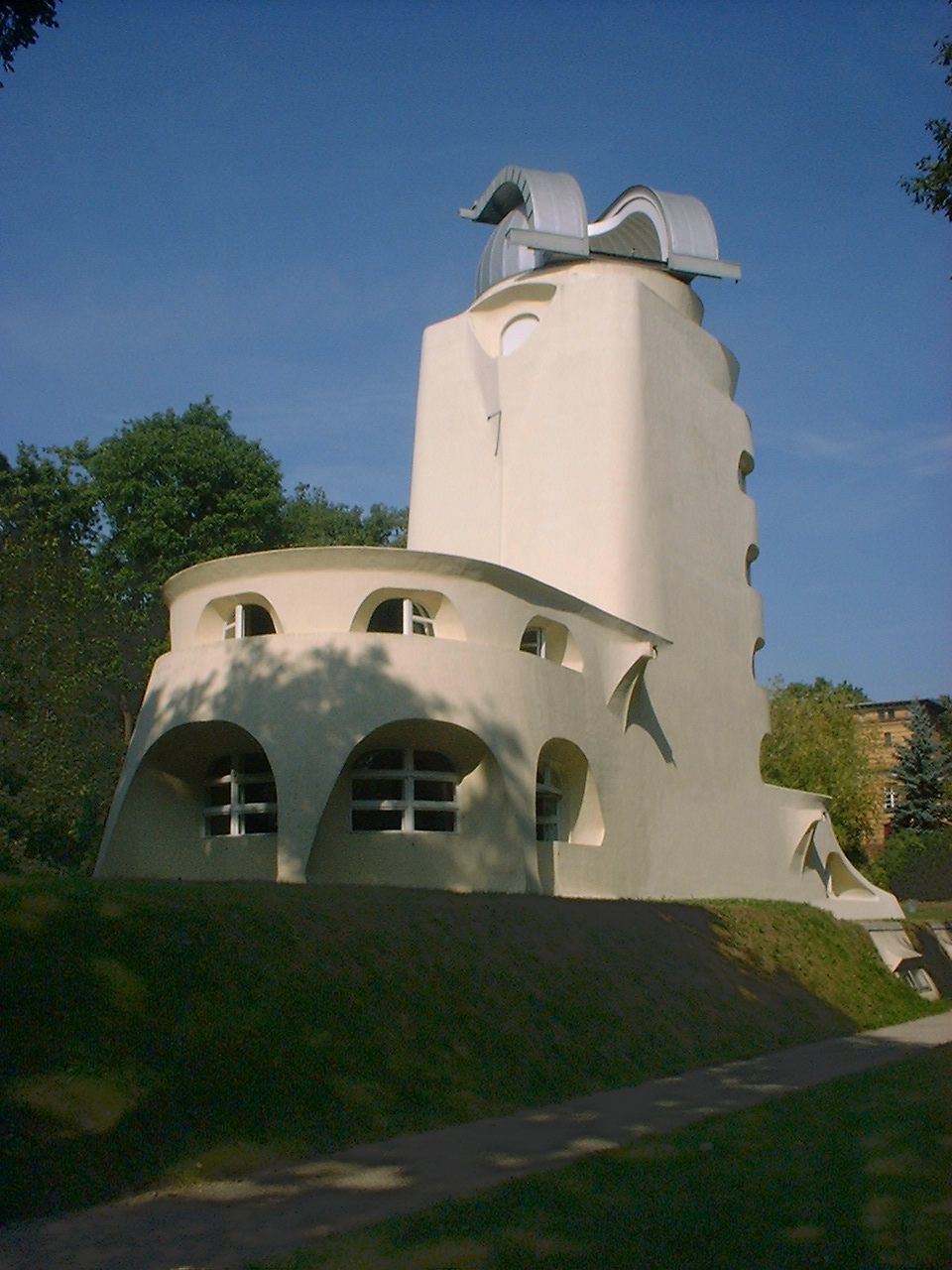
Rear view of the Einstein Tower in Potsdam

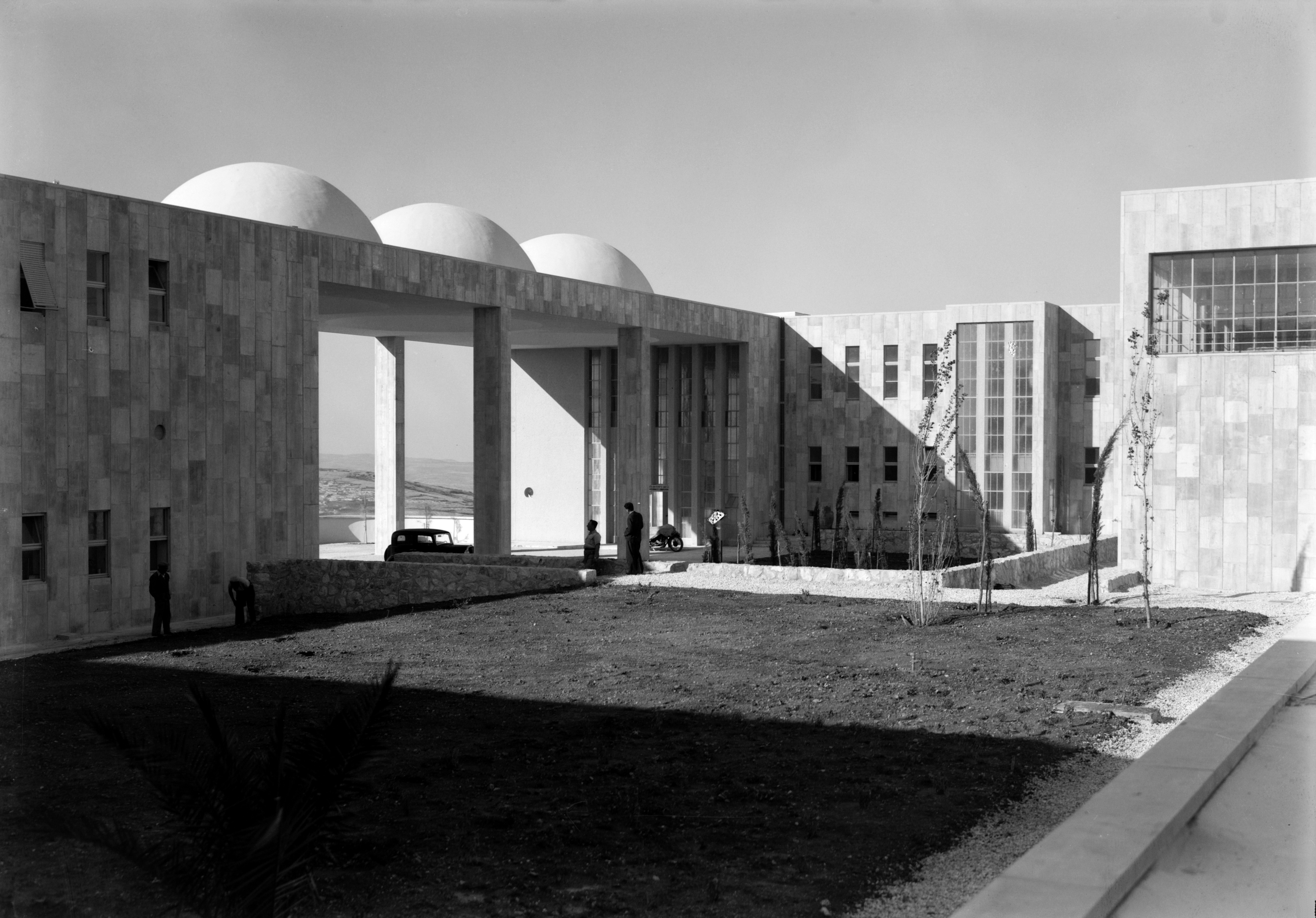
Hadassah University Hospital, Mt. Scopus, Jerusalem

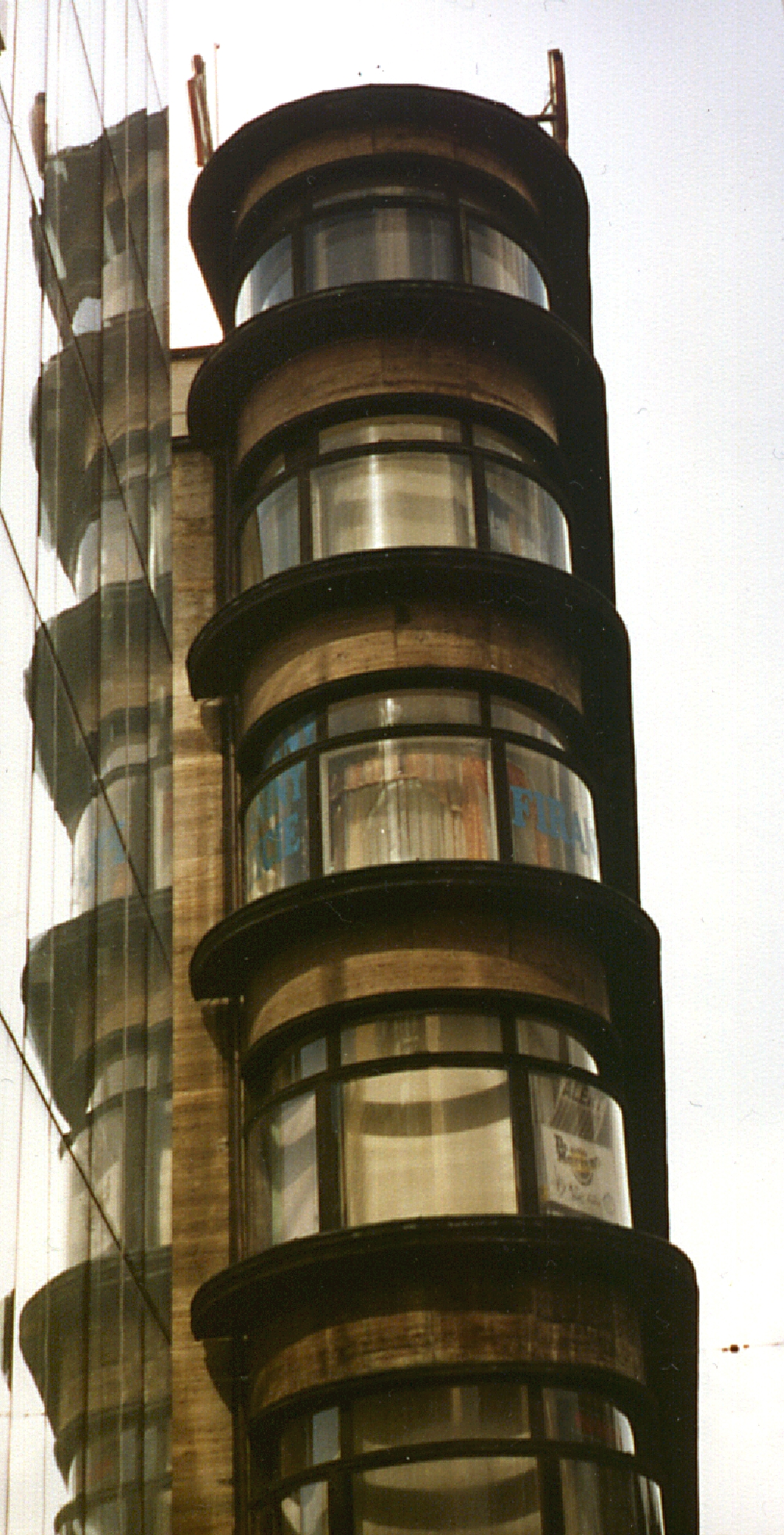
Petersdorff Shopping Centre in Breslau, now Wrocław (Detail)

- Taharah building in Allenstein (1913), today known as the Mendelsohn house.
- Workers' colony for the Builders' Union in Luckenwalde (1919–1920)
- Garden pavilion of the Herrmann family, Luckenwalde (1920)
- Work hall of the Herrmann hat factory, Luckenwalde (1919–1920)
- Conversion of the administration building of the Hausleben insurance company, Berlin (1920)
- Einsteinturm (Observatory on the Telegraphenberg) in Potsdam, 1917 or 1920–1921 (building), 1921–1924 (technical equipment). The building, its expressionistic form giving the impression of concrete as a building material, was mostly built in brick and then covered with plaster. Mendelsohn explained this was because of delivery problems; however, it is presumed that the real reason for the choice of building materials was problems with constructing the casing.
- Double villa on Karolingerplatz, Berlin (1921–1922)
- Steinberg hat factory, Herrmann & Co, Luckenwalde (1921–1923) with a strict, angular form
- Mossehaus, conversion of the offices and press of Rudolf Mosse, Berlin (1921–1923)
- Weichmann silks store, Gleiwitz, Schlesien (1922)
- Villa of Dr. Sternefeld, Berlin, (1923–1924)
- Department Store for C. A. Herpich and Sons, furriers, Berlin (1924–1929)
- Schocken department store, Nuremberg (1925–1926)
- Red Flag Textile Factory, Leningrad, (1926)
- Extension and conversion of Cohen & Epstein department store, Duisburg (1925–1927)
- Cottage of Dr. Bejach, Berlin-Steinstücken (1926–1927)
- Schocken department store, Stuttgart (1926–1928). The department store, together with the Tagblatt-Turm (1924–1928) of Ernst-Otto Oßwald across the way, constituted an impressive ensemble of modern architecture, and was damaged only lightly in World War II. In 1960, the city Stuttgart demolished both, despite international protest. In its place today stands Egon Eiermann's unremarkable department store building (Galeria Kaufhof, previously Horten).
- Exhibition pavilion for the publishing house Rudolf Mosse at the "Pressa" in Cologne (1928)
- Rudolf Petersdorff store, Breslau (1927–1928)
- Woga-Komplex and Universum-Kino (cinema), Berlin (1925–1931)
- Jüdischer Friedhof (Jewish cemetery), Königsberg, East Prussia (1927–1929)
- Schocken department store, Chemnitz 1927–1930, known for its curved front with horizontal strip windows.
- His own home, Am Rupenhorn, Berlin (1928–1930)
- House of the German Metal Workers' Union, Berlin-Kreuzberg (1928–1930)
- Columbus-Haus, Potsdamer Platz, Berlin (1928–1932), a 10 storey office building characterised by long strip windows, one of the boldest examples of New Objectivity in Germany. Damaged WW2, burned out in 1953, demolished soon after (not to be confused with the "Columbia-Haus" in Berlin-Tempelhof).
- Jewish youth center, Essen (1930–1933)
- Doblouggården store, Oslo, Norway (1932). Built by Rudolf Emil Jacobsen from Mendelsohn's plans
- The De La Warr Pavilion, Bexhill-on-Sea, Sussex, England (1934). In collaboration with Serge Chermayeff.
- Nimmo House (later renamed Shrubs Wood by former owner Bridget D'Oyly Carte), Chalfont St Giles, Buckinghamshire, England (1933–1934). In collaboration with Serge Chermayeff.
- Cohen House, Chelsea, London (1934–1936). In collaboration with Serge Chermayeff.
- Gilbey Firm, Camden, London (1935–1936). In collaboration with Serge Chermayeff.
- Weizmann House, Weizmann Institute campus, Rehovot near Tel Aviv (1935–1936)
- Built around the same time: a cluster of three buildings on the Weizmann Institute campus, presently housing high-resolution NMR, biological MRI, and the Kimmel Center for Archeology, respectively
- Zalman Schocken villa and library, Jerusalem (1934–1936)
- Hebrew University, Jerusalem (1934–1940)
- Hadassah University Hospital, Mt. Scopus, Jerusalem (1934–1939)
- Anglo-Palestine-Bank, Jaffa Road Jerusalem (1936–1939)
- Haifa Municipal Hospital, Haifa (1937–1938)
- B'Nai Amoona (Sons of Faith) Synagogue, now Center of Creative Arts (COCA), St. Louis, Missouri (1945–1950)
- Maimonides Hospital, San Francisco (1946–1950)
- Park Synagogue, Cleveland Heights, Ohio (1946–1953)
- Russell house, San Francisco (1947–1951)
- Emanuel Synagogue, Grand Rapids, Michigan (1948–1954)
- Mount Zion Synagogue, St. Paul, Minnesota (1950–1954)
