= Schocken Department Store, Stuttgart =

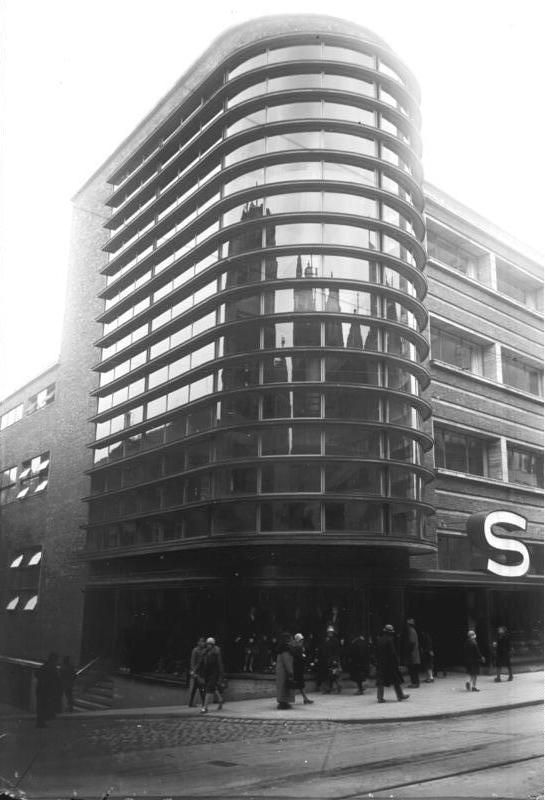
Schocken Department Store Stuttgart, 1928

The Schocken Department Store in Stuttgart, built in 1924–26, was one of the most prominent examples of the Modernist New Objectivity movement in German architecture, and demolished despite protests in 1960. Along with other departments stores designed by its architect Erich Mendelsohn, it introduced a style later popularised internationally as Streamline Moderne.

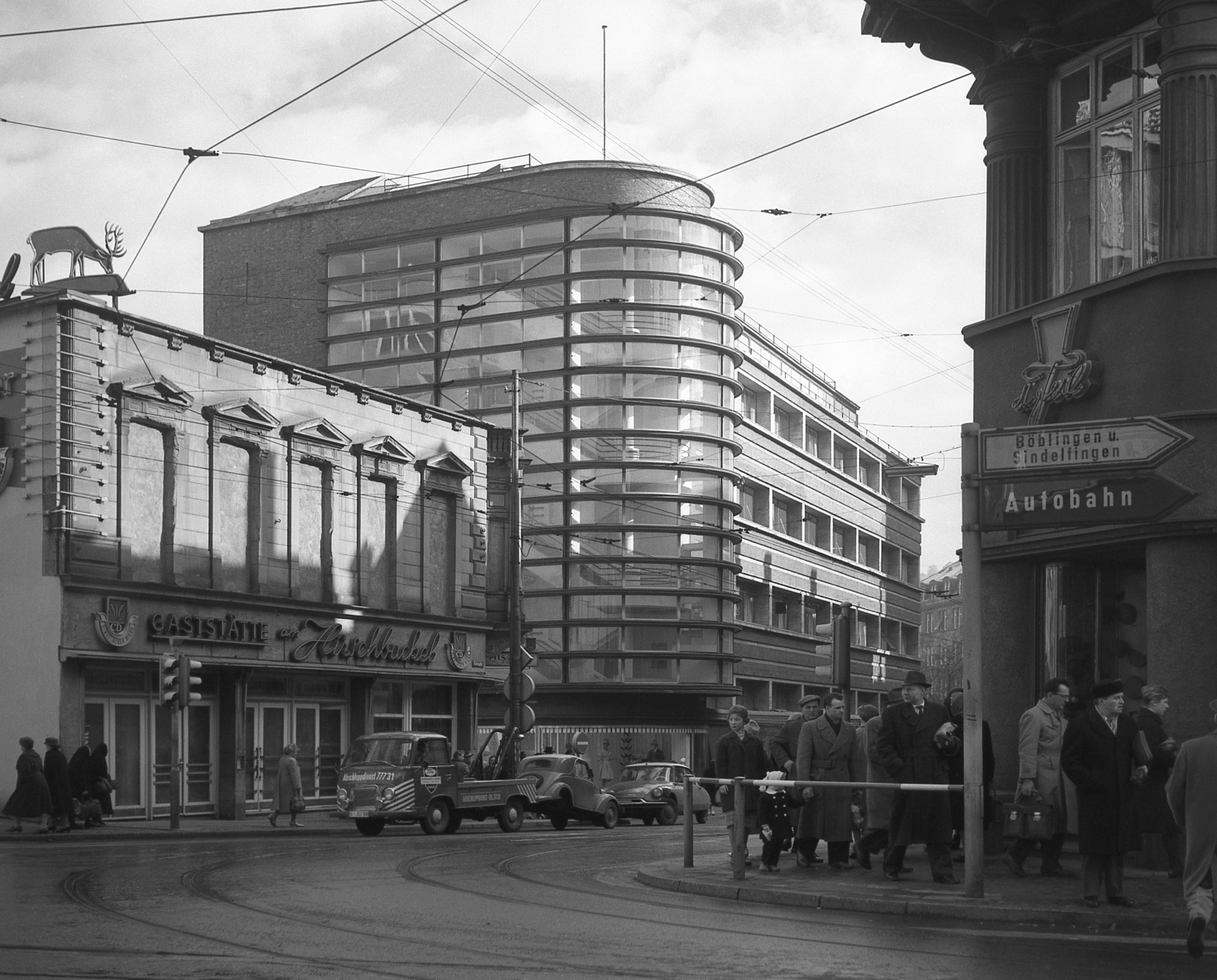
Schocken Department Store, Stuttgart, ca. 1960

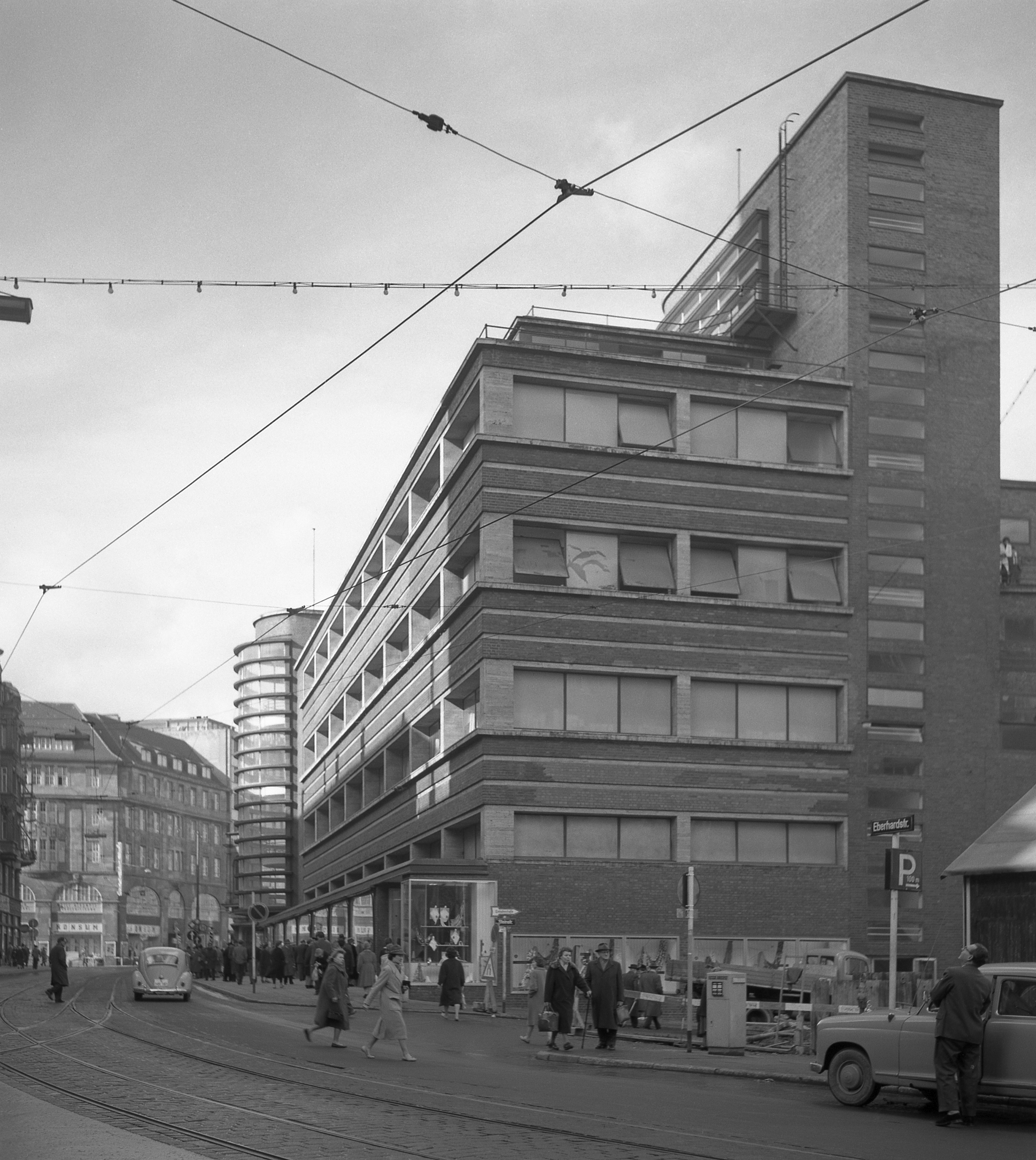

The Schocken department store chain was established by Salman Schocken in the 1920s, which by 1930 had 20 stores across southern Germany. The architect Erich Mendelsohn, had designed the earlier Kaufhaus Schocken in Nuremberg (1926, demolished) and the later store in Chemnitz (1930), but the Stuttgart store was the most significant of the three. The inspiration for the design came to Mendelsohn while he was attending a concert of music by Bach.

The department store was a strikingly modern design in what was then a traditional urban context. The sweeping horizontal lines, juxtaposed by a vertical semicircular all-glass projection, were elements later refined and developed as the Streamline Moderne internationally in the 1930s. The shop floors had mainly wooden furnishings and, in the absence of air conditioning, a large number of windows. Again owing to the absence of air conditioning, the food hall was situated in the basement. The name of the store was displayed in lettering some 2.28 meters in height and illuminated after dark. The booklet which he designed for the opening features Mendelsohn's coloured sketch. He also created a logo and branding style based on the lettering on the façade of the store.

The department store, together with the Tagblatt-Turm built across the street at the same time, created an impressive ensemble of modern architecture, and was damaged only slightly in World War II. In 1960, the local authority allowed the demolition of the store, despite international protest. In its place today stands the department store (Galeria Kaufhof, previously Horten), designed by Egon Eiermann.

== See also ==
- Schocken Department Stores
