= Erich Mendelsohn =

Jewish German British architect (1887–1953)

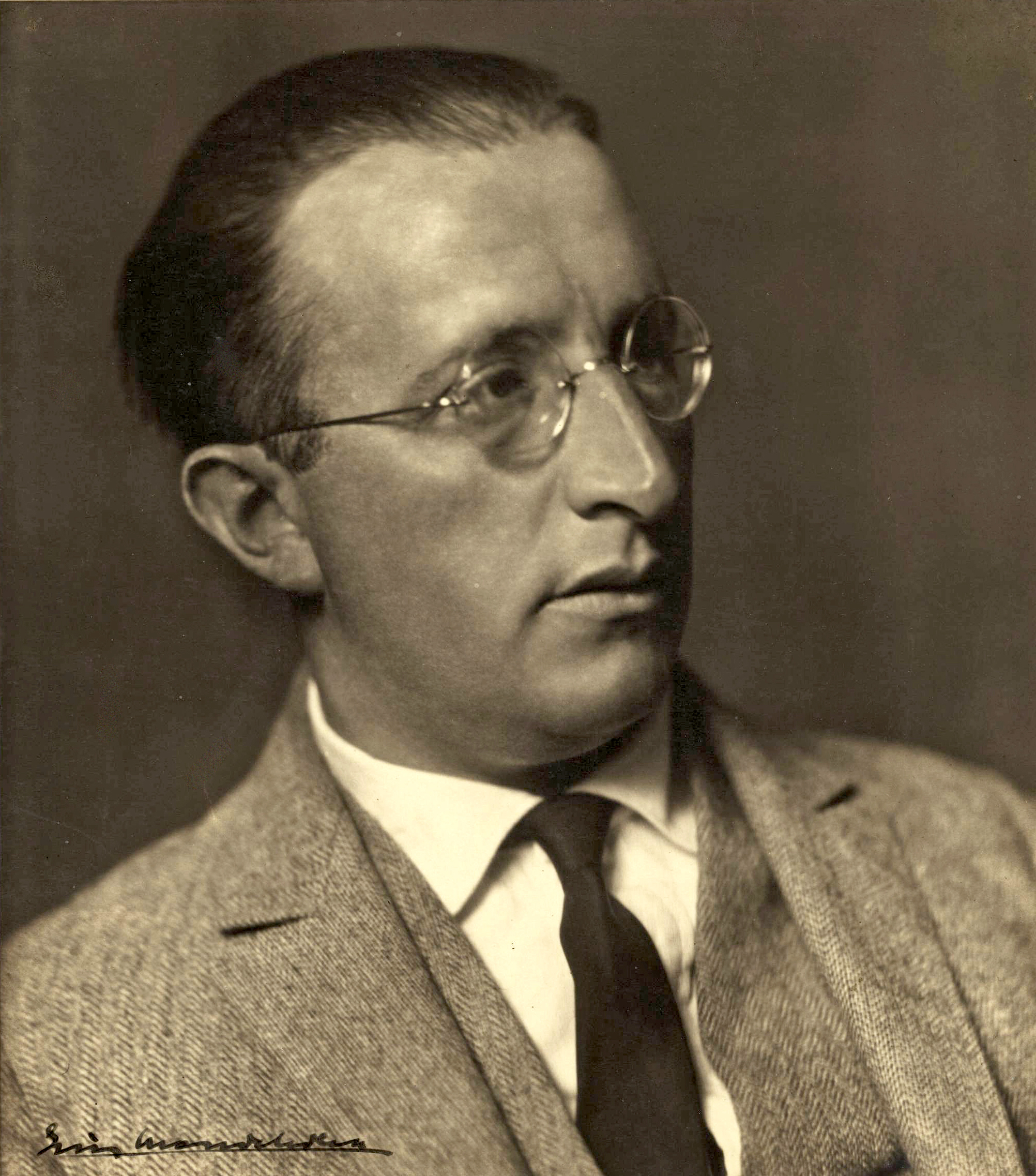
- Mendelsohn in 1925
- Born: 21 March 1887; Allenstein, Prussia (now Olsztyn, Poland)
- Died: 15 September 1953 (aged 66); San Francisco, California, United States
- Citizenship: German, British (since 1938)
- Occupation: Architect
- Spouse: Luise Maas (m. 1915)
- Buildings: Einstein Tower, Potsdam; De La Warr Pavilion, Bexhill on Sea; Petersdorff Department Store, Breslau (Wrocław); Weizmann House, Rehovot
- Projects: Hebrew University of Jerusalem

Erich Mendelsohn (German pronunciation: [ˈeːʁɪç ˈmɛndl̩ˌzoːn]; 21 March 1887 – 15 September 1953) was a German-British architect, known for his expressionist architecture in the 1920s, as well as for developing a dynamic functionalism in his projects for department stores and cinemas. Mendelsohn was a pioneer of the Art Deco and Streamline Moderne architecture, notably with his 1921 Mossehaus design.

== Biography ==
Mendelsohn was born to a Jewish family in Allenstein, East Prussia, Germany, now the Polish city of Olsztyn. His birthplace was at the former Oberstrasse 21, now no. 10 Staromiejska street. A plaque embedded on the wall on the side of Barbara street commemorates his place of birth. He was not related to the Mendelssohn family.

He was the fifth of six children; his mother was Emma Esther (née Jaruslawsky), a hatmaker and his father David was a shopkeeper. He attended a humanist Gymnasium in Allenstein and continued with commercial training in Berlin.

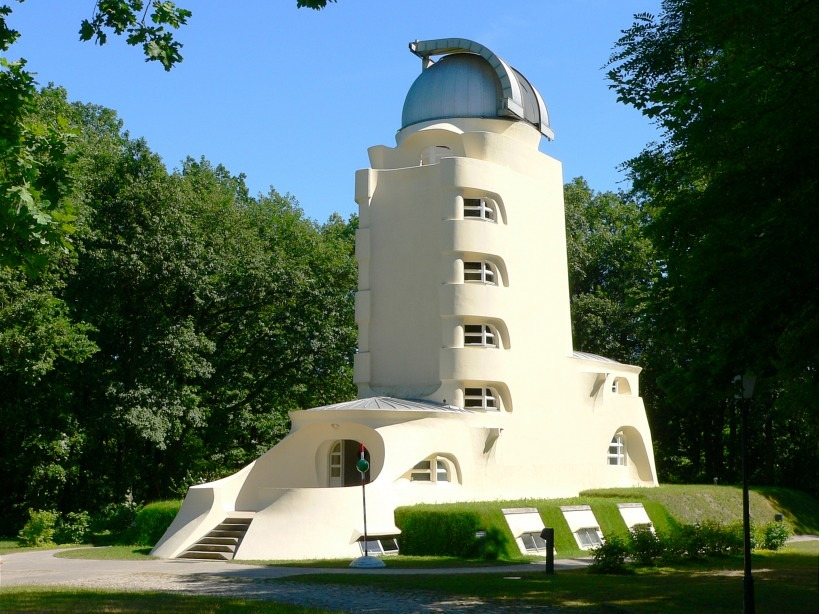
Einstein Tower in Potsdam

In 1906, he took up the study of national economics at the Ludwig-Maximilians-Universität München. In 1908, he began studying architecture at the Technische Hochschule Charlottenburg; two years later he transferred to the Technische Hochschule München, where in 1912 he graduated cum laude. In Munich, he was influenced by Theodor Fischer, an architect whose own work fell between neo-classical and Jugendstil, and who had been teaching there since 1907; Mendelsohn also made contact with members of Der Blaue Reiter and Die Brücke, two groups of expressionist artists.

From 1912 to 1914, he worked as an independent architect in Munich. In 1915, he married the cellist Luise Maas. Between 1910 and 1953, they corresponded with each other; these materials provide insight into the lives of an artist and couple who experienced a changing international landscape, including their fleeing from the Third Reich in Germany in 1933. Through his wife, he met the cello-playing astrophysicist Erwin Finlay Freundlich. Freundlich was the brother of Herbert Freundlich, the deputy director of the Kaiser Wilhelm Institut für Physikalische Chemie und Elektrochemie (now the Fritz Haber Institute of the Max Planck Society in the Dahlem district of Berlin). Freundlich wished to build a suitable astronomical observatory to experimentally confirm Einstein's Theory of Relativity.

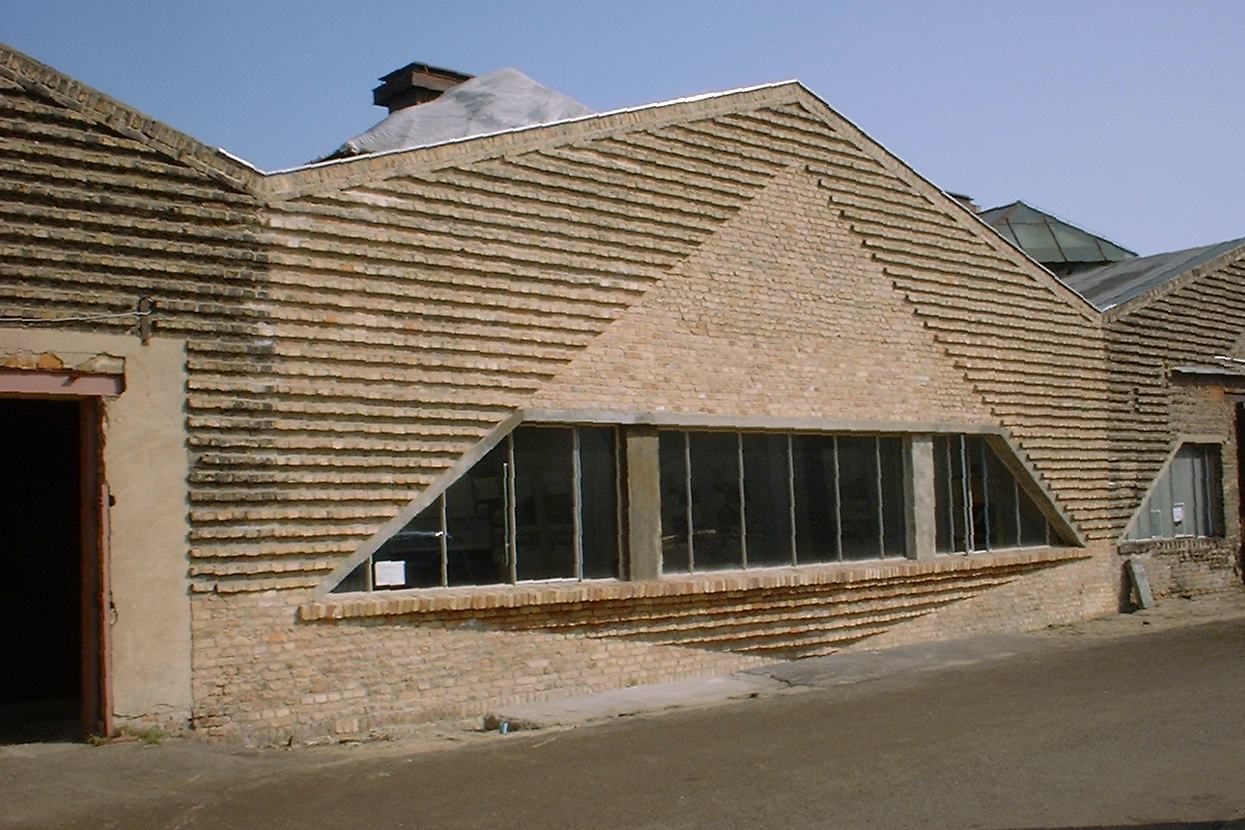
Hat Factory in Luckenwalde

Through his relationship with Freundlich, Mendelsohn had the opportunity to design and build the Einsteinturm ("Einstein Tower"). This relationship and also the family friendship with the Luckenwalde hat manufacturers Salomon and Gustav Herrmann helped Mendelsohn to an early success. From then until 1918, what is known of Mendelsohn is, above all, a multiplicity of sketches of factories and other large buildings, often in small format or in letters from the front to his wife, Louise Mendelsohn (née Maas; 1895–1980). The 2011 documentary film by Duki Dror titled "Incessant Visions" is about Erich Mendelsohn and his wife, in which Dror animates the memoirs of Louise and the letters.

== Architecture career ==
At the end of 1918, on his return from World War I, he settled his practice in Berlin. The Einsteinturm and the hat factory in Luckenwalde established his reputation. The Hat Factory was commissioned in 1921, Mendelsohn's design included four production halls, a boiler, a turbine house, two gatehouses and a dyeing hall. The dyeing hall became a distinctive feature of the factory, the building was shaped with a modern ventilation hood that expelled the toxic fumes used in the dyeing process. The structure even ironically resembled a hat.

As early as 1924, Wasmuths Monatshefte für Baukunst (a series of monthly magazines on architecture) produced a booklet about his work. In that same year, along with Ludwig Mies van der Rohe and Walter Gropius, he was one of the founders of the progressive architectural group known as Der Ring. His practice employed as many as forty people, among them, as a trainee, Julius Posener, later an architectural historian. Mendelsohn's work encapsulated the consumerism of the Weimar Republic, most particularly in his shops: most famously the Schocken Department Stores. Nonetheless, he was also interested in the socialist experiments being made in the USSR, where he designed the Red Banner Textile Factory in 1926 (together with the senior architect of this project, Hyppolit Pretreaus). His Mossehaus newspaper offices and Universum cinema were also highly influential on art deco and Streamline Moderne.

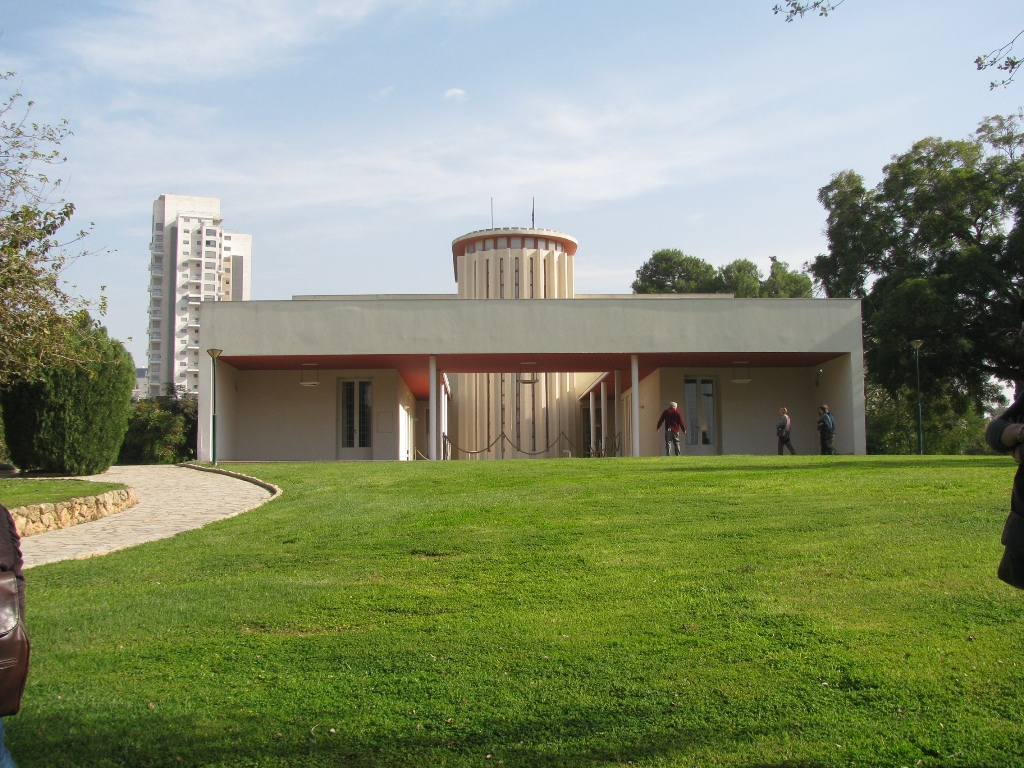
Weizmann residence, Weizmann Institute of Science, Rehovot

In 1926, he bought an old villa, and in 1928, he designed Rupenhorn, nearly 4000 m^{2}, which the family occupied two years later. With an expensive publication about his new home, illustrated by Amédée Ozenfant among others, Mendelsohn became the subject of envy.

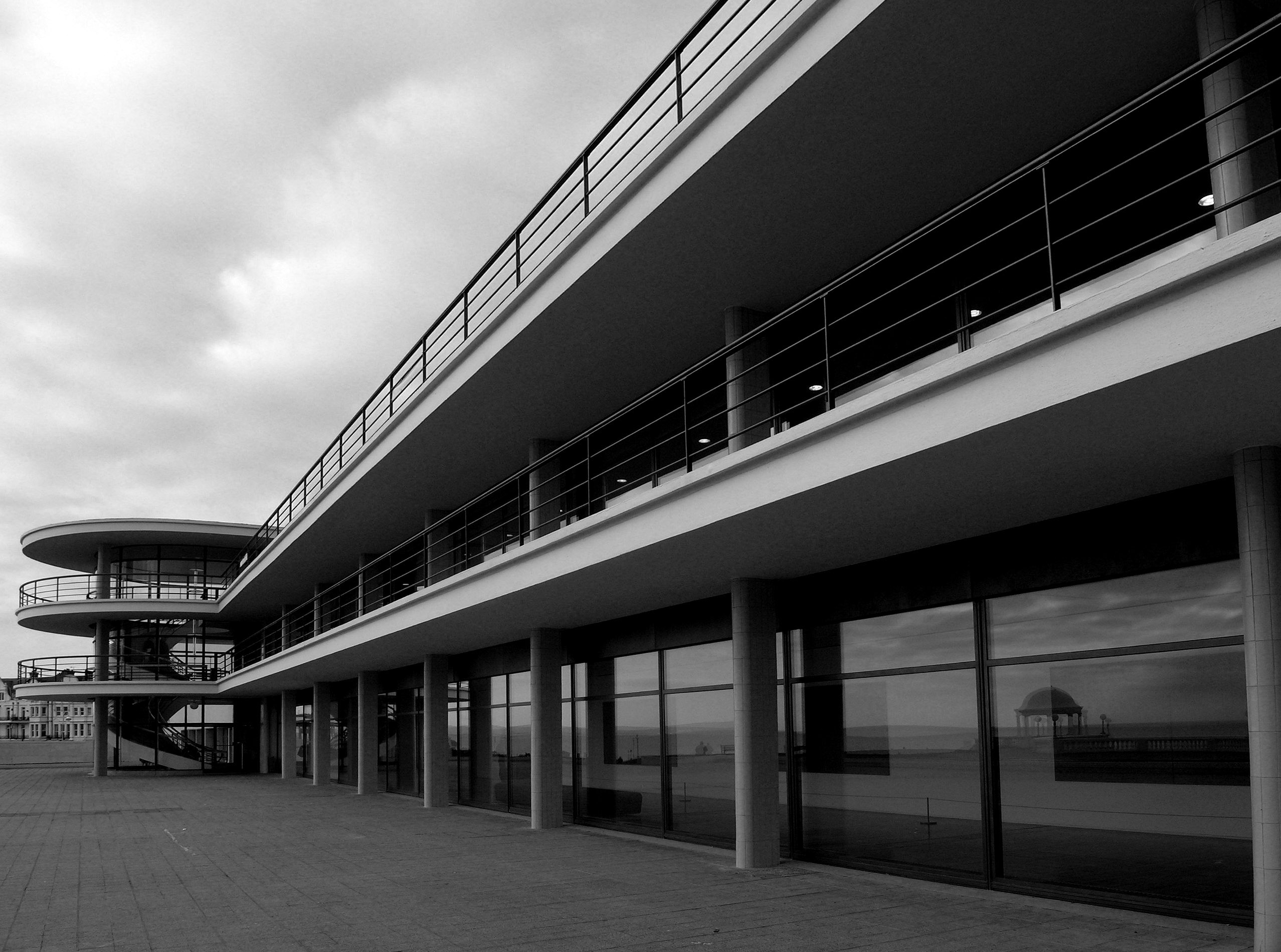
De La Warr Pavilion in Bexhill on Sea

In the spring of 1933, in the wake of growing antisemitism and the rise of the Nazis in Germany, he fled to England. His assets were seized by the Nazis, his name struck from the list of the German Architects' Union, and he was excluded from the Prussian Academy of Arts. In England he formed an architectural practice with Serge Chermayeff, which continued until the end of 1936 and together they designed two important private houses – Cohen House and Shrubs Wood – and the De La Warr Pavilion, an entertainment and arts complex in the seaside town of Bexhill-on-Sea, commissioned and paid for by the local landowner.

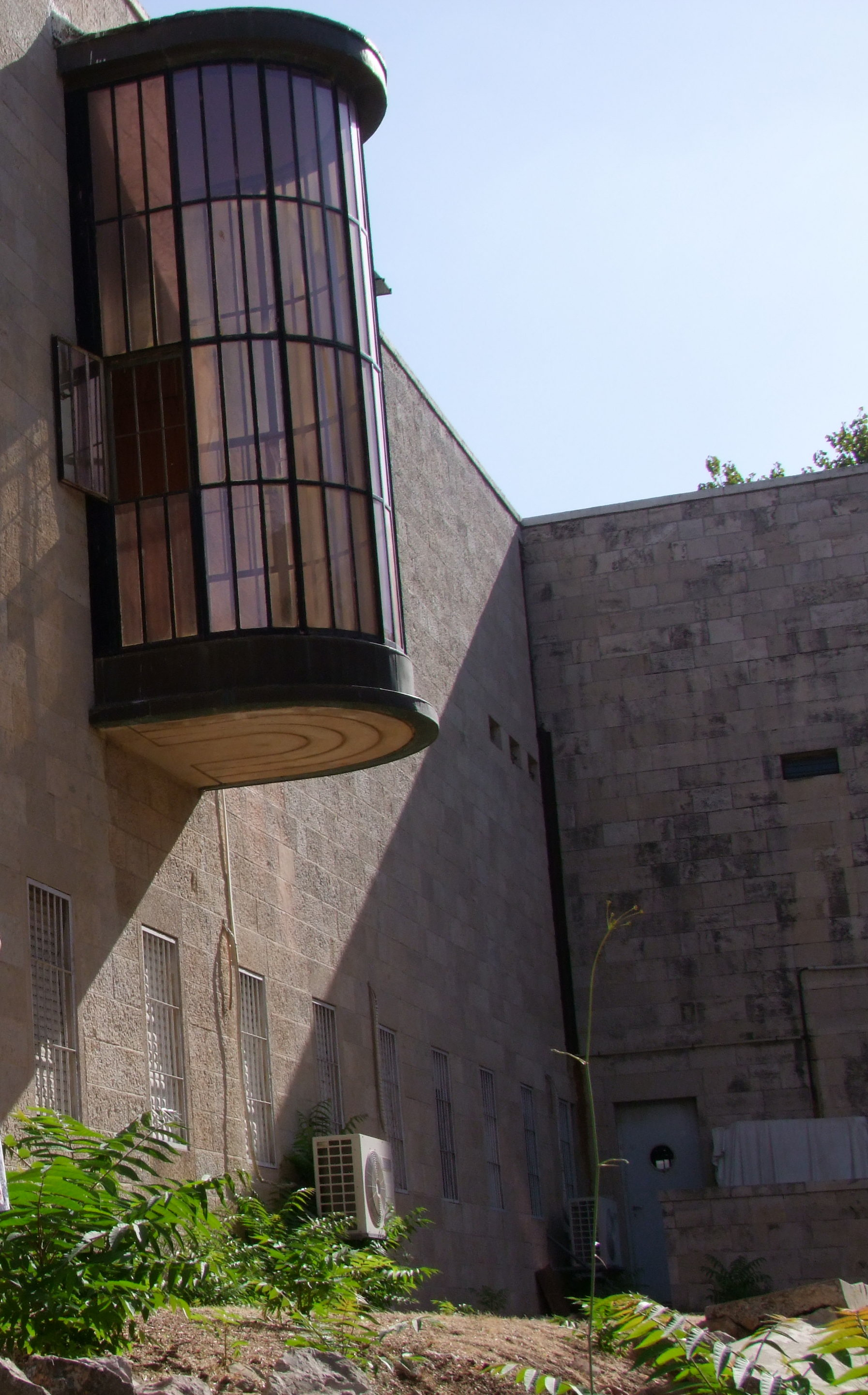
A rounded balcony in the Shoken library, Jerusalem, 1935

Mendelsohn had long known Chaim Weizmann, later President of Israel. At the start of 1934 he began planning on Weizmann's behalf a series of projects in Mandatory Palestine during the British Mandate. In 1935, he opened an office in Jerusalem and planned Jerusalem stone buildings in the International Style that greatly influenced local architecture. In 1938, he dissolved his London office. At that same time he and his wife received British citizenship and he changed his name to "Eric"; the new citizenship also allowed them to issue guarantees and thus bring other family members to Britain. In Mandatory Palestine, Mendelsohn built many now-famous buildings: Weizmann House and three laboratories at the Weizmann Institute of Science, Anglo-Palestine Bank in Jerusalem, Hadassah Hospital on Mount Scopus, Rambam Hospital in Haifa and others.

From 1941 until his death, Mendelsohn lived in the United States and taught at the University of California, Berkeley. Until the end of World War II his activities were limited by his immigration status to lectures and publications. However, he also served as an advisor to the U.S. government. For instance, in 1943 he collaborated with the U.S. Army and Standard Oil in order to build "German Village", a set of replicas of typical German working-class housing estates, which would be of key importance in acquiring the know-how and experience necessary to carry out the firebombing of Berlin. In 1945, he established himself in San Francisco. From then until his death in 1953 he undertook various projects, mostly for Jewish communities.

== Buildings (selected) ==
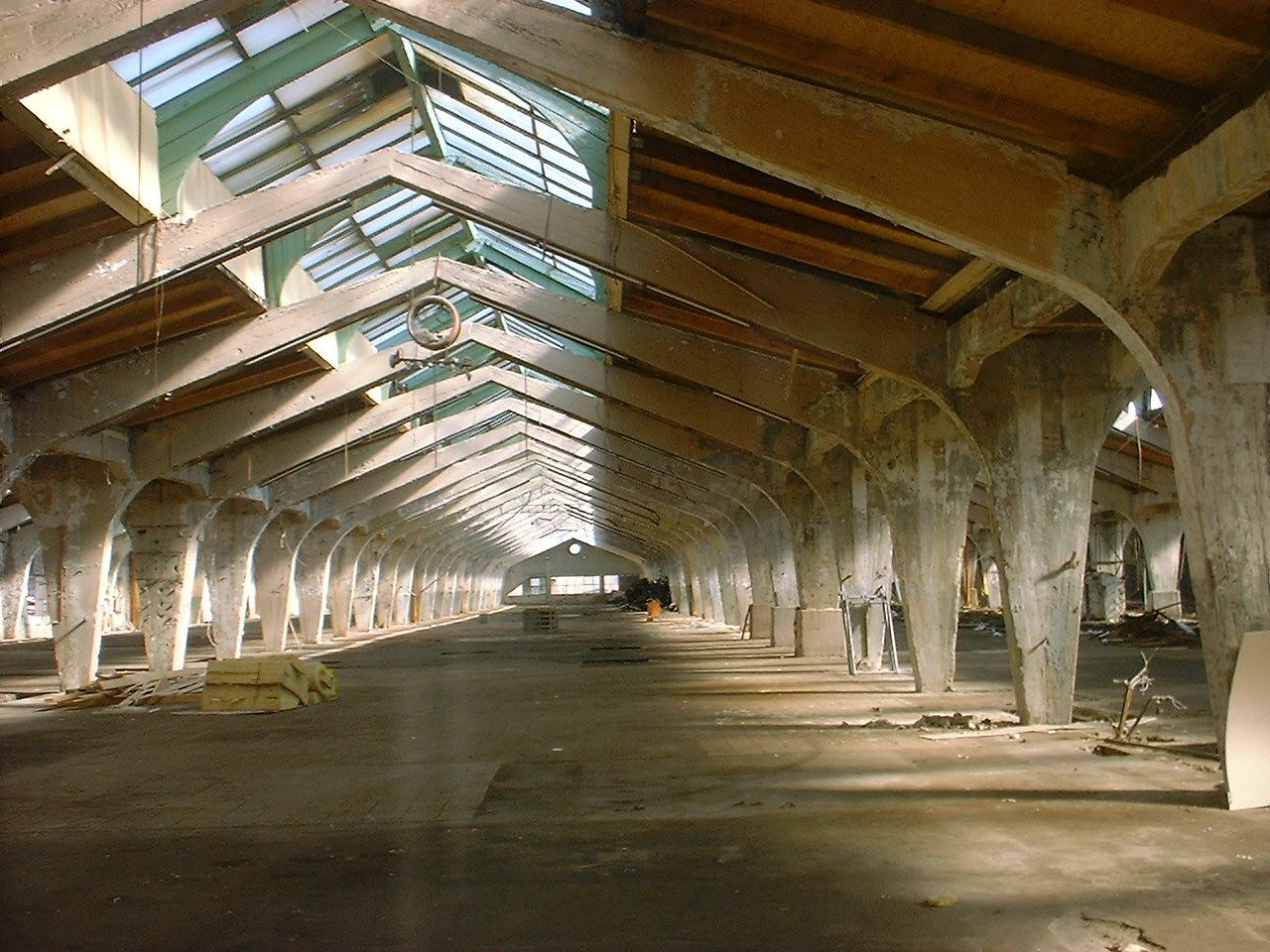
Interior view of the Hat Factory in Luckenwalde

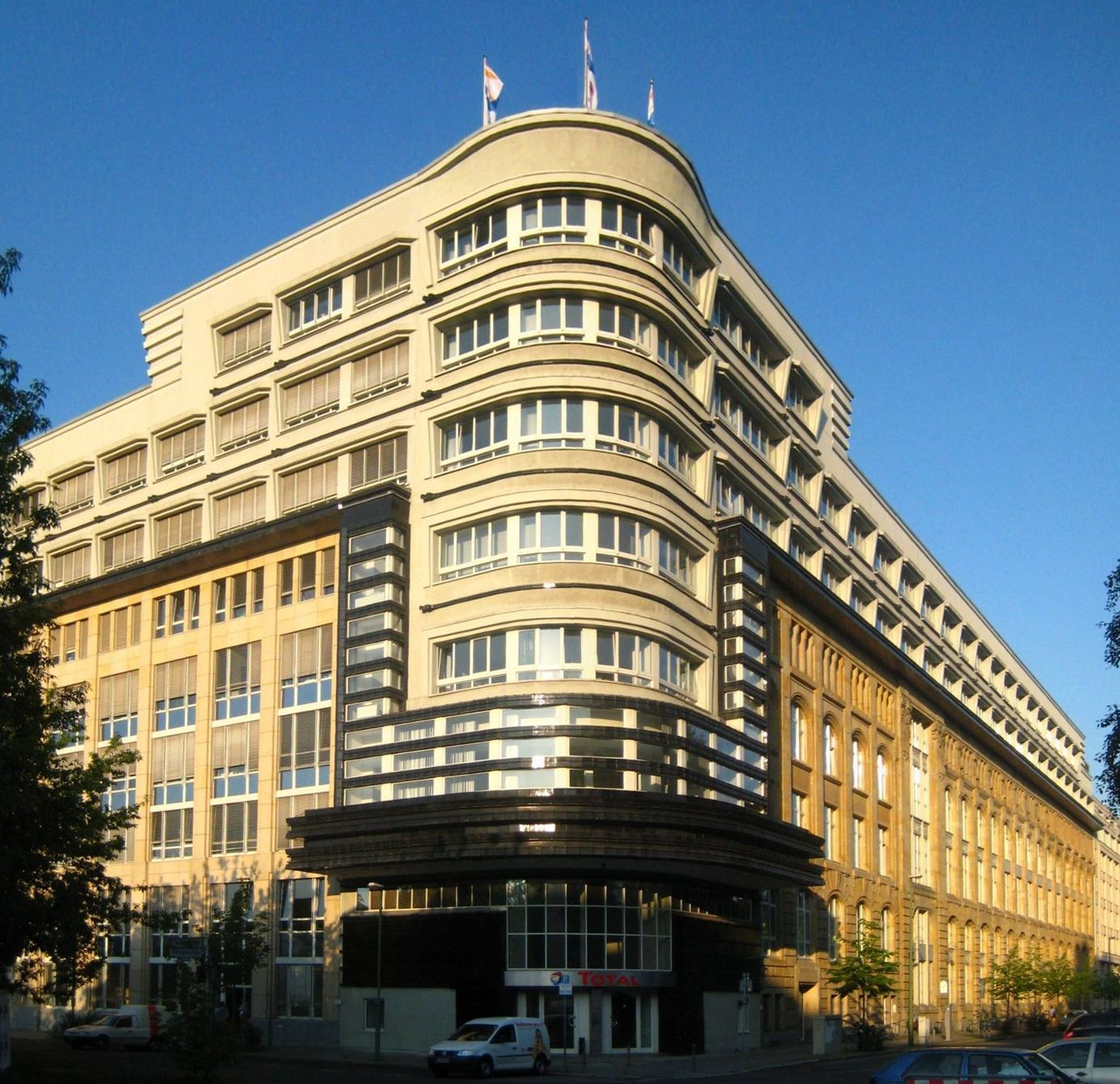
Mossehaus in Berlin

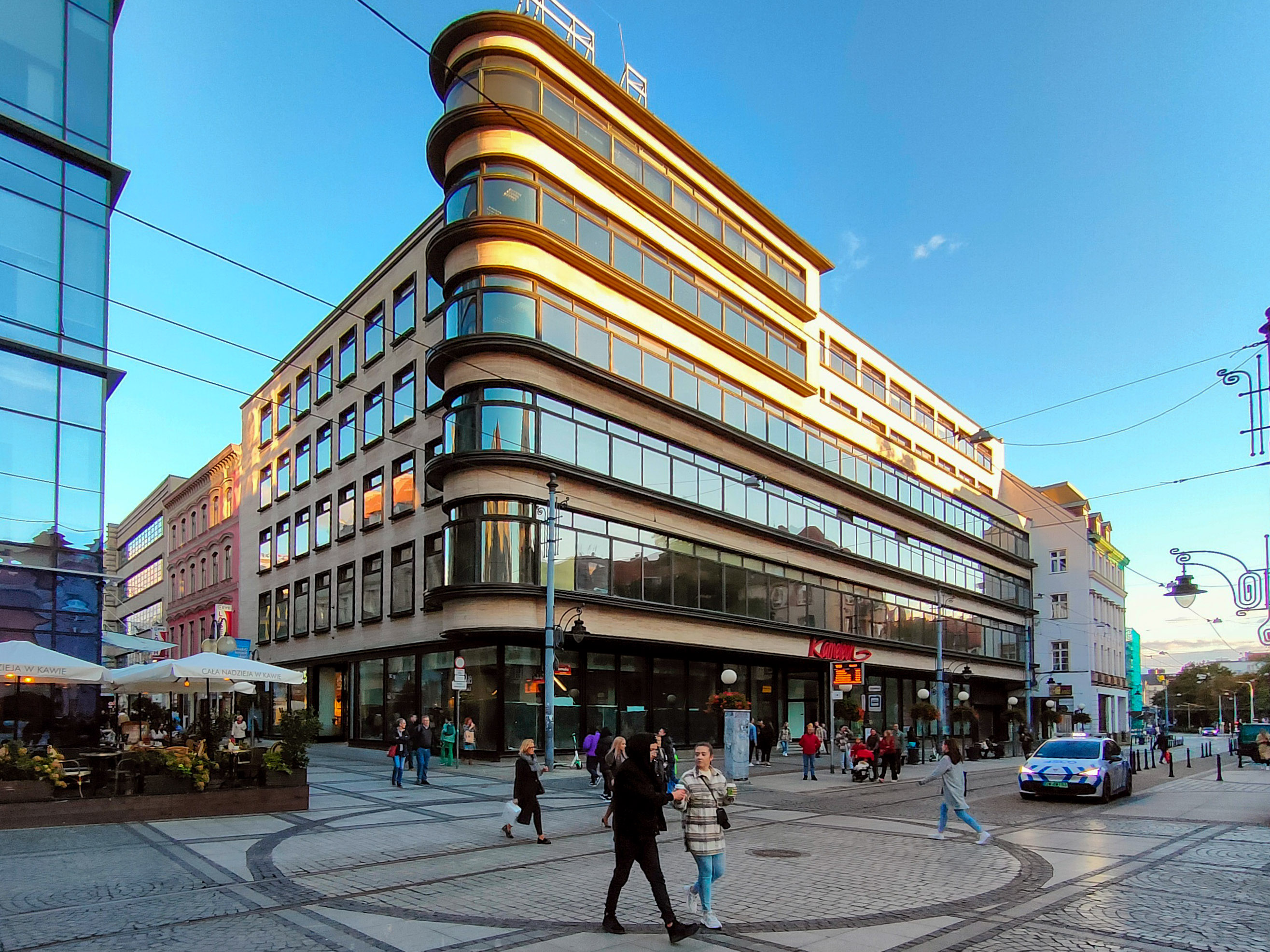
Petersdorff (Kameleon) department store in Wrocław

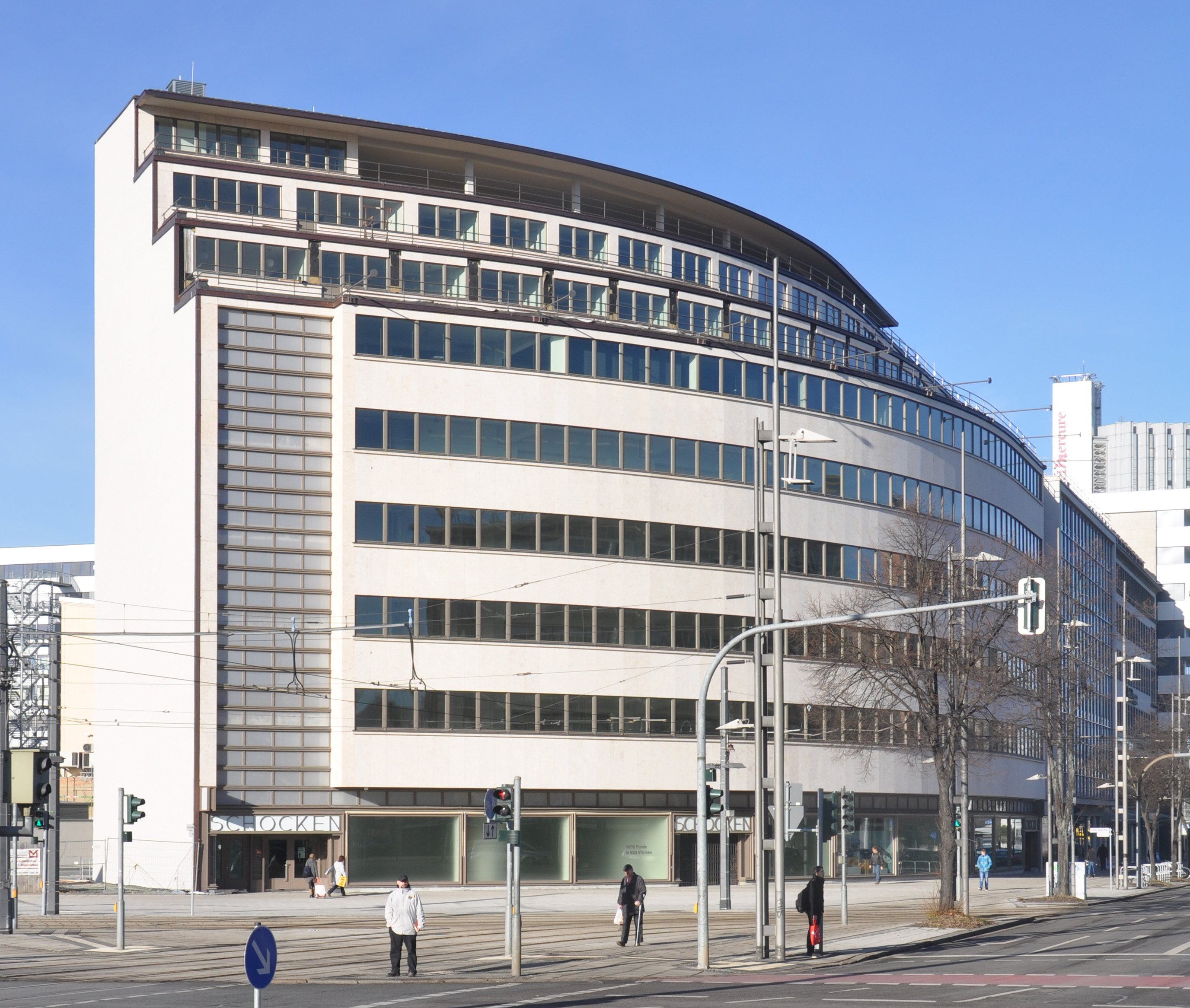
Former Schocken Department Store in Chemnitz, shortly before re-opening as State Museum of Archaeology Chemnitz (smac)

- Taharah building in Allenstein (1913), today known as the Mendelsohn house.
- Work hall of the Herrmann hat factory, Luckenwalde (1919-1920)
- Einsteinturm (solar observatory on the Telegraphenberg) in Potsdam, 1917 or 1920-1921 (building), 1921-1924 (technical equipment). The tower's expressionist form is suggestive of concrete as a building material, but it is mostly brickwork, rendered. Mendelsohn explained this was because of delivery problems; however, there may have been difficulties in constructing the formwork for poured concrete.
- Steinberg hat factory, Herrmann & Co, Luckenwalde (1921-1923) with a strict, angular form
- Mossehaus, renovation and expansion of the newspaper offices and press of Rudolf Mosse, Berlin (1921-1923). Designed in collaboration with Richard Neutra, who was at that time working for Mendelsohn and was responsible for the interior design of the project.
- Schocken department store, Nuremberg (1925-1926)
- Red Flag Textile Factory, Leningrad, 1926. Mendelsohn authored the building of the power station of the factory; the other buildings were authored by S. O. Ovsyannikov, E. A. Tretyakov, and Hyppolit Pretreaus, who was the senior architect of this project. The complex of buildings of this factory is included in the List of the objects of historical and cultural heritage issued by the government of Saint Petersburg in 2001 (with additions of 2006).
- Extension and conversion of Cohen & Epstein department store, Duisburg (1925-1927)
- Schocken department store, Stuttgart (1926-1928). The department store, together with the Tagblatt-Turm (1924-1928) of Ernst-Otto Oßwald across the way, constituted an impressive ensemble of modern architecture, and was damaged only lightly in World War II. In 1960, the city of Stuttgart demolished the store, despite international protest. In its place today stands Egon Eiermann's unremarkable department store building (Galeria Kaufhof, previously Horten).
- Exhibition pavilion for the Rudolf Mosse publishing house at the Pressa in Cologne (1928)
- Woga-Komplex and Universum-Kino (cinema), Berlin (1925-1931)
- Schocken department store, Chemnitz (1927-1930), known for its arched front with horizontal strips of windows.
- His own home, Am Rupenhorn, Berlin (1928-1930)
- Columbushaus, Potsdamer Platz, Berlin (1928-1932). Burnt out during the June 1953 uprising and demolished in 1957 (sometimes confused with the “Columbia-Haus" camp in Berlin-Tempelhof, demolished 1937).
- Bachner department store in Ostrava (1932-1933)
- Jewish youth center, Essen (1930-1933)
- Nimmo House (later renamed Shrubs Wood by former owner Bridget D'Oyly Carte), Chalfont St Giles, Buckinghamshire, England (1933–1934). In collaboration with Serge Chermayeff.
- The De La Warr Pavilion, The Promenade, Bexhill-on-Sea, Sussex, England (1934). Commissioned by Earl De La Warr and designed in partnership with Serge Chermayeff.
- Cohen House, Old Church Street, Chelsea, London (1934-1936). Designed in partnership with Serge Chermayeff. Later renamed Hamlyn House and restored and extended by Sir Norman Foster
- Weizmann House, Weizmann Institute campus, Rehovot near Tel Aviv (1935-1936)
- Built around the same time: a cluster of three buildings on the Weizmann Institute campus, presently housing high-resolution NMR, biological MRI, and the Kimmel Center for Archeology, respectively
- Hebrew University of Jerusalem, Jerusalem (1934-1940)
- B'Nai Amoona (Sons of Faith) Synagogue, now Center of Creative Arts (COCA), St. Louis, Missouri (1945–1950)
- Maimonides Hospital, San Francisco (1946-1950)
- Park Synagogue, Cleveland Heights, Ohio (1947-1951)
- Beth El Synagogue, Baltimore, Maryland (1948)
- Russell House, San Francisco, California (1951)
- Mount Zion Temple, St. Paul, Minnesota (1950 – 1956). Construction completed after his death.

== Published works (German) ==
- Erich Mendelsohn: Amerika. Bilderbuch eines Architekten (1976) Berlin: Nachdruck Da Capo Press, ISBN 0-306-70830-2
- Erich Mendelsohn: Rußland – Europa – Amerika. Ein architektonischer Querschnitt. (1929) Berlin
- Erich Mendelsohn: Neues Haus – Neue Welt. Mit Beiträgen von Amédée Ozenfant und Edwin Redslob (1932) Berlin. Reprinted, with an afterword by Bruno Zevi (1997) Berlin
