= Park Synagogue =

Conservative synagogue in Ohio

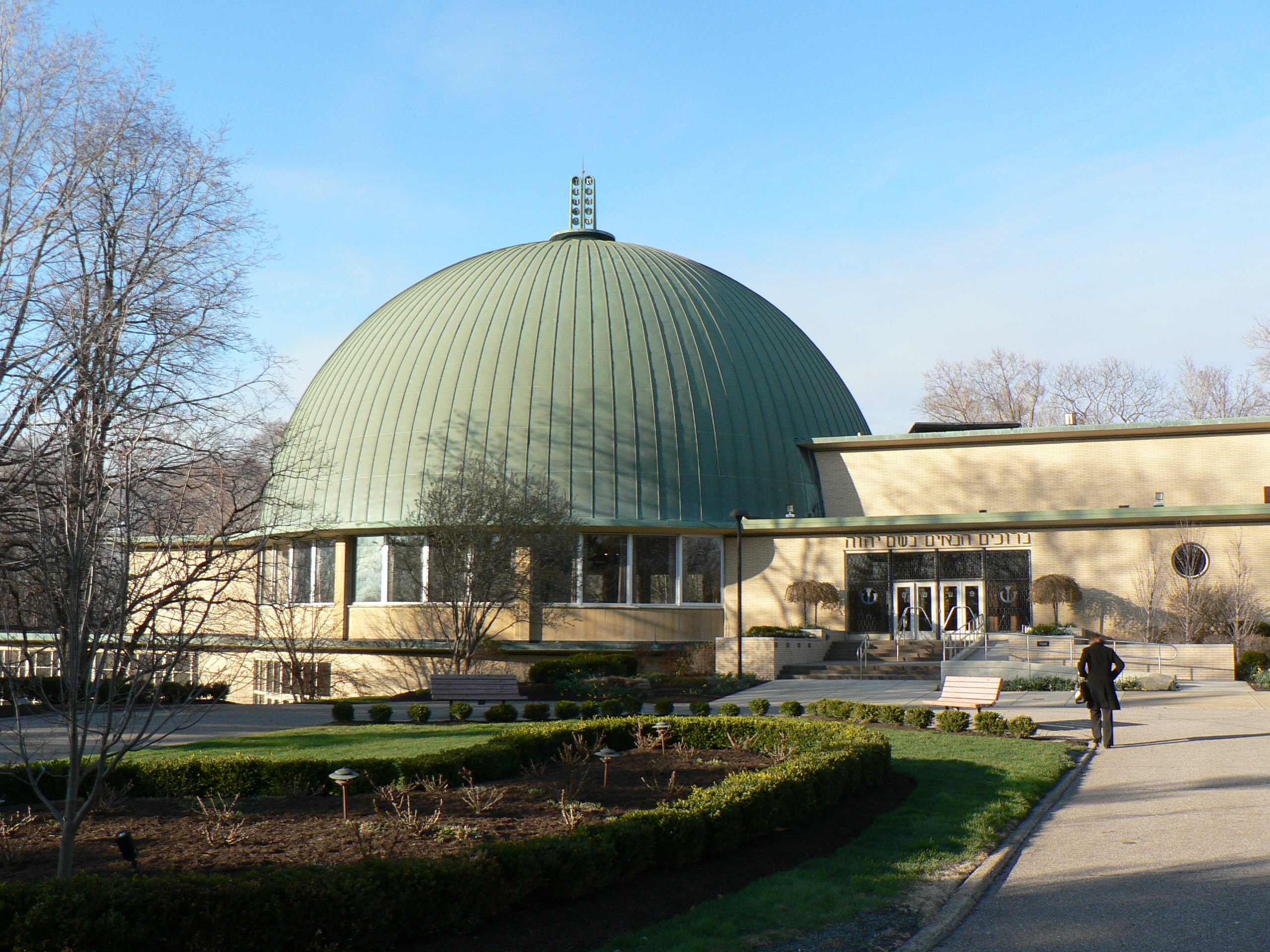

- Location in Ohio

Religion
- Affiliation: Conservative Judaism
- Ecclesiastical or organisational status: Synagogue
- Leadership: Rabbi Joshua Skoff; Rabbi Sharon Young Marcus; Milton B. Rube (Rabbi-in-Residence); Rabbi Rosie Barron Haim (Auxiliary Rabbi)
- Status: Active

Location
- Location: 27500 Shaker Boulevard, Pepper Pike, Cleveland, Ohio 44124
- Country: United States
- Coordinates: 41°28′38″N 81°29′08″W

Architecture
- Established: 1869 (as ao congregation)
- Completed: 1922 (Cleveland Jewish Center); 1950 (Cleveland Heights); 2005 (Pepper Pike)

The Park Synagogue is a Conservative synagogue located at 27500 Shaker Boulevard, Pepper Pike, Cleveland, Ohio, in the United States.

Established as two Orthodox congregations, Anshe Emeth, founded by Polish Jews in 1869 that merged with Beth Tefilo in 1917 to form the Anshe Emeth Beth Tefilo Conregation. In the mid-1920s, the congregation changed its affiliation from Orthodox to Conservative. From the 1950s until 2005, the congregation occupied a site located at Cleveland Heights.

Into the 1970s, Park Synagogue was among the largest Conservative Jewish congregations in the United States.

Rabbi Joshua Skoff has served as senior rabbi since 1990.

== History ==
The Park Synagogue has its origins in two Orthodox Jewish congregations: Anshe Emet and Beth Tefilo congregations. Anshe Emeth was founded in 1869 by Polish Jews who lived originally in downtown Cleveland. By 1888, disagreements among congregants over the synagogue's direction led some members to leave and form a Reform congregation. In 1903, the remaining members built a new synagogue at Woodland and 55th Street. Yet by 1917, Cleveland's Jews began relocating eastward, which led Anshe Emeth's leadership to merge with Beth Tefilo, and under the leadership of Rabbi Samuel Benjamin the combined congregation bought land at the southeast corner of East 105th Street and Drexel Avenue for the new Cleveland Jewish Center which began construction in 1920, relocating from E 37th St and Woodland Ave. to a newly constructed building. Until its shift in affiliation from Orthodox to Conservative Judaism in the mid-1920s, Anshe Emeth was the largest Orthodox Jewish congregation in Cleveland.

Upon completion in 1922, with its extensive facilities, the edifice was named the Cleveland Jewish Center and the synagogue quickly became a focal point of Jewish life in Cleveland - particularly in the Glenville neighborhood. In addition to a synagogue, the center had a ballroom, a recreation center, and an indoor swimming pool. At this time, under the leadership of Rabbi Solomon Goldman, the congregation transitioned from Orthodox to Conservative.

The change of orientation proved highly controversial for many members. Among the changes, women and men were allowed to sit together and the selling of Aliyot was forbidden. Threats were made against the rabbi; legal action was mounted, which was appealed all the way to the Ohio Supreme Court, that refused to hear the case. The rabbi who championed the changes, Rabbi Goldman, left the Cleveland Jewish Center in 1929 to assume another pulpit, that of the Anshe Emeth Synagogue in Lakeview, Illinois where he established himself as a well-respected leader. To replace Rabbi Goldman the congregation called upon a gentle and scholarly man as their spiritual leader to heal the divisions. Rabbi Harry S. Dawidowitz led the Jewish Center for 5 years, until he decided to move his family to Palestine in 1934.

Rabbi Solomon Goldman had taken a young boy, Armond Cohen, under his wing when he came to the congregation in 1922. Cohen had lost both parents to the influenza pandemic in 1918 in Canton, Ohio. He came to live with his grandparents in Cleveland and the Jewish Center became his second home. When Armond graduated from Glenville High School with no certain direction and after winning an oratory contest, Goldman made arrangements for Armond to attend New York University and the Jewish Theological Seminary of America to become a rabbi. Goldman would pay for the first year and procured promises of loans from the Sisterhood of the congregation to cover the rest.

In 1934, Rabbi Armond Cohen was ordained at the Jewish Theological Seminary and at age 25, was named Rabbi of the Cleveland Jewish Center (later known as the Park Synagogue), a position he would hold until 1986 when he became Distinguished Service Rabbi. He remained with the congregation and functioned as a rabbi until his death in 2007 just after his wife, Anne, died. With the synagogue burdened by debt, together with lay leaders, Cohen raised funds to alleviate the financial crisis. Then less than a decade later, with Cleveland Jewry continuing to move eastward, Cohen and the synagogue's leadership recognized, though reluctantly, the need to set the stage for a new facility further east. Thus, the congregation purchased at 3300 Mayfield Road, Cleveland Heights, the property of the defunct Park School.

=== Cleveland Heights site ===
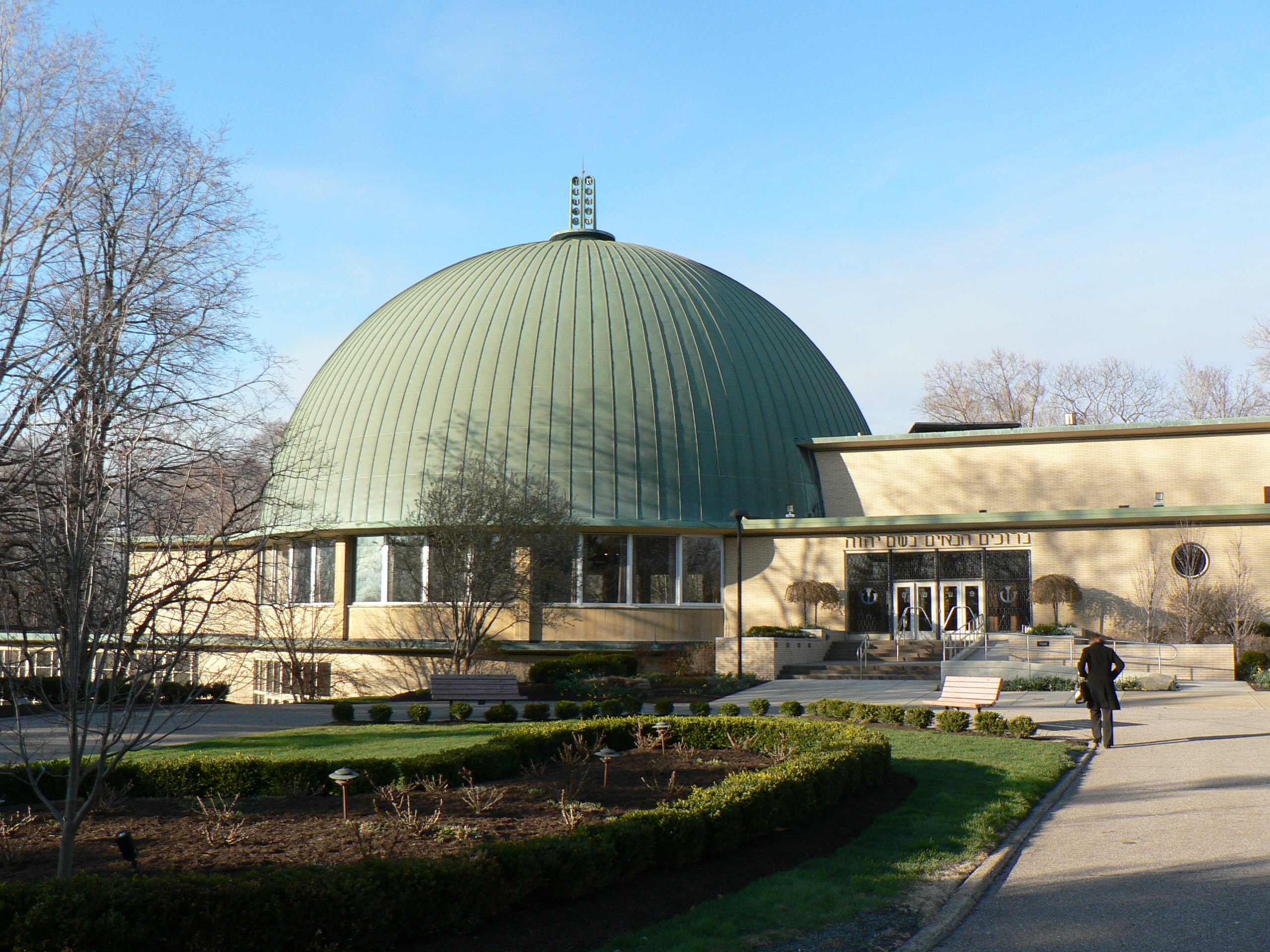
The dome of Park Synagogue's former Cleveland Heights building, designed by Erich Mendelsohn, since vacated.

The following summer, in 1943, a day care and nursery school began functioning there, and an adjacent lot of 21 acres (8.5 ha) was purchased from John D. Rockefeller - thus forming a magnificent property with a creek and ravine running through it. In the late 1940s a fire broke out, destroying at least one former Park School building which had served as the synagogue's library and also destroyed Torah scrolls.

Erich Mendelsohn, a renowned German-Jewish architect who fled Nazism in 1933, was hired to design the new synagogue. With the main building completed in 1950, the school in 1953, Park Synagogue is considered a significant example of modern synagogue design. One writer commented that its "adventurous use of space is masterly; there are surprises round every corner and unexpected vistas at every turn." During this same period, Rabbi Cohen led in the establishing of the Park Hebrew School, Park Day Camp, and the Lillian Ratner Montessori School. Rabbi Dr. George Pollak served as the educational director of the multiple schools run by the synagogue, which had enrolled more than 2000 students in the 1960s.

However, in the late 1960s land was donated in Pepper Pike for a new educational facility, under the concept that members who had lived far out would be appeased with the school and perhaps day camp location enabling overall membership to remain strong such that the Cleveland Heights architectural masterpiece could be maintained indefinitely. At about the same time a large addition, with a bridge over the ravine, was built in Cleveland Heights adding a second auditorium, banquet hall, and smaller rooms - designed by local architects. Then in 1986, a plan was devised for Park to merge with the otherwise folding Temple B'rith Emeth, across Brainard Circle from the vacant land Park had already acquired. This facility, the first Park Synagogue East which after a while starting housing some daily adult activities, went for about 20 years. However, it was decided still another facility was warranted, and in 2005 Park Synagogue completed the new Park East facility, on the property across Brainard Circle that had been donated in the 1960s. The architect was Centerbrook Architects & Planners, and the first Park East was taken over by Ratner Montessori.

Following the congregation vacating the Cleveland Heights site, there were moves in 2022 to register the site on the National Register of Historic Places, as well as a UNESCO World Heritage Site. The site was listed on the National Register in 2024. There was a proposal to restore the site and become a community center for events, education and performances.

== Modern times ==
=== 1990-2000 ===
Rabbi Skoff joined Park Synagogue in 1990, and was subsequently elected Senior Rabbi. He in 1996 was granted life tenure by the congregation. He created interactive services, empowered congregants, and made Judaism accessible to young and old. He emphasized inclusivity, and personalized Judaism to his congregants. Rabbi Skoff refashioned Friday evening worship into a music-filled, fast-paced participatory service, and introduced questions and answers into Saturday morning worship, along with topical dialogues and congregational shared learning. He introduced and encouraged different programming for congregants who come from Conservative, but also Reform and Orthodox backgrounds.

Rabbi Skoff increased membership and nearly doubled the school population. Adult Education programming and outreach were emphasized. New affiliate groups for every age group were created. In 1993–96, Park's Endowment Fund was established, providing support for synagogue programs.

=== 2001-2010 ===
Park Synagogue was one of the first Conservative synagogues to build a "Mikvah" (a ritual immersion pool of water, used to mark life transitions: conversion to Judaism, marriage, overcoming serious illness, the monthly transition of the menstrual cycle). Building its own Mikvah was necessary after the newly opened Orthodox mikveh was closed for ceremonies performed by non-Orthodox rabbis.

In 2005, funding for the new Park Synagogue East building was secured, and for the first time, daily services, all administrative offices, Friday evening services, and the Park Day Camp became located in the East building. Sabbath day and evening services are now entirely held at The Park East location, including major Jewish holidays like Passover, Shavuot, and Sukkot, as well as periods of weeks at various other times of the year. Park Synagogue is one of the largest Conservative congregations in the United States. The United Synagogue has conferred upon Park 11 Solomon Schechter "Synagogue of Excellence" Awards. The United Synagogue has also conferred Excellence Awards for Worship and Ceremonies, Library Computerization, Strategic Planning, Access and Concern for the Disabled, Programs and Celebrations, and Fundraising. The award for Worship and Ceremonies reflects dialogue and discussion within the services themselves, klezmer and traditional music, and congregational involvement as prayer leaders. Approximately 1,800 families call Park Synagogue home.

In 2005 Rabbi Skoff received the honor of lighting a Hanukah menorah with the First Family in the White House. Rabbi Skoff spoke words marking the occasion, recited a blessing and lit the menorah as the President and First Lady Laura Bush watched and participated. For this special occasion, Park Synagogue supplied a menorah retrieved from the Nazis after World War II that resides in the synagogue's art collection.

In April 2008, The Park Synagogue East facility hosted an episode of The Food Network's "Dinner: Impossible" series in which the celebrity chef Michael Symon, prepared a kosher Passover Seder kosher meal for 100 people in six hours. The episode aired in August 2008 and included Rabbi Skoff and caterer Marlene Leitson who ensured the kashrut of Michael Symon's seder.

In 2008, Rabbi Skoff was honored with the newly endowed Leighton Rosenthal Chair in Rabbinics.

=== 2011-present ===
In 2010, the newly opened National Museum Of American Jewish History in Philadelphia chose Park Synagogue as a "Featured Synagogue," one of only a dozen congregations chosen to depict and illustrate Jewish life in America.

Dr. Ruth Westheimer, sex therapist, talk show host, author, professor, Holocaust survivor, and former Haganah sniper, visited The Park Synagogue in 2015. Rabbi Skoff interviewed Dr. Ruth in an unrehearsed synagogue program entitled "The Rabbi and Dr. Ruth." The provocative and informative discussion dealt with Jewish attitudes towards sexuality, intimacy, and communication in relationships, as well as Dr. Ruth's experience as a Holocaust orphan.

In 2016, Rabbi Skoff was named one of "America's Most Inspiring Rabbis" by Forward magazine.

Park Synagogue continues with preschool and youth associations such as Kadima and United Synagogue Youth and Park's Hebrew School. Park's adult education includes Bible, Talmud, and Hebrew Studies as well as adult B'nai Mitzvah preparation and outreach to intermarried couples. The synagogue's Brotherhood/Men's Club and Sisterhood interface with the community. Programming includes community speakers and pre-High Holiday "Institutes" with key figures such as former Cleveland Mayor Jane Campbell, Ohio Education Chancellor Eric Fingerhut, U.S. Senator Sherrod Brown, Governor Ted Strickland and U.S. Representative Marsha Fudge.

== See also ==
- History of the Jews in Ohio
- List of works by Erich Mendelsohn
