= Mossehaus =

Office building in Berlin

Coordinates: 52°30′31.86″N 13°23′48.86″E

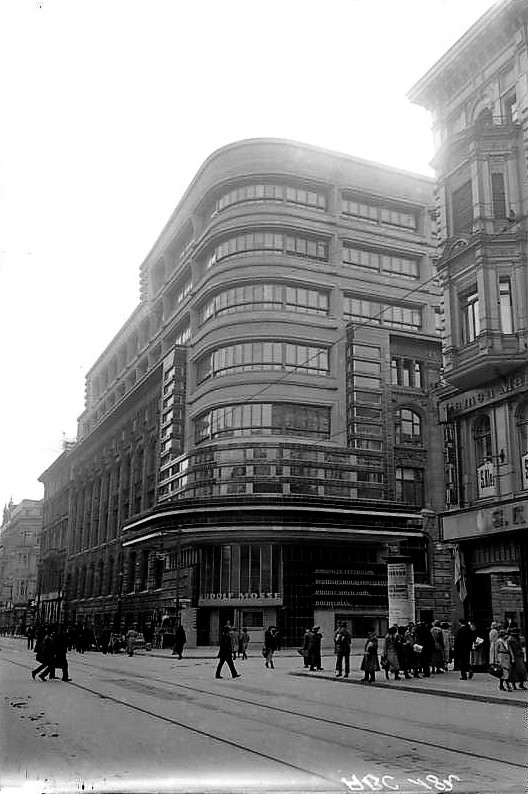
Mossehaus, September 1923

Mossehaus is an office building on 18–25 Schützenstraße in Berlin, renovated and with a corner designed by Erich Mendelsohn between 1921 and 1923.

The original Mosse building housed the printing press and offices of the newspapers owned by Rudolf Mosse, mainly liberal newspapers such as the Berliner Tageblatt. The sandstone-fronted historicist 1901 building by Cremer & Wolffenstein was badly damaged in 1919 during the Spartacist uprising; held by the insurrectionists, it was laid under siege by government troops.

In 1921, on the strength of his Einstein Tower, Mendelsohn was hired to add extra storeys and a new entrance to the building. The new frontage made prominent use of aluminum and modern typography, and the new upper floors were made from ferro-concrete. The experimental nature of the structure led to a disaster during construction in 1923, when one of the slabs of the new extension fell into the newspaper offices, which were still in use, killing 14 people.

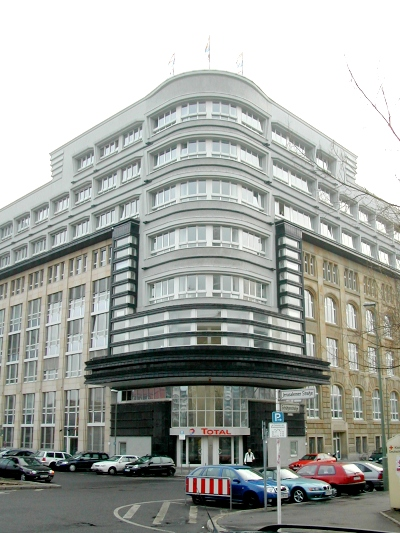
Mossehaus in 2006, on the corner of Jerusalemerstraße and Schützenstraße

The use of strips and sculpted elements in the fenestration gave it a dynamic, futuristic form, emphasised by the contrast with the earlier Wilhelmine style. It was one of the first examples of a streamlined building, and hence a great influence on Streamline Moderne. The effect on American architecture is perhaps unsurprising, as Mendelsohn's partner on the Mossehaus and the designer of the interiors was Richard Neutra.

The building was very badly damaged during World War II. The entire wing along Jerusalemerstraße was destroyed, as was the façade on the corner of Schützen-/Jerusalemerstraße, which was elaborately constructed by Mendelsohn. After the war, it was rebuilt in a simplified form.

The building was very close to the Berlin Wall, so it became dilapidated. Though Mossehaus was at one time the tallest non-church building in Berlin, it is now dwarfed by the nearby Fischerinsel tower blocks on the former East side and the Axel Springer AG buildings on the former West side. The building was restored to its original splendor in the 1990s.
