= Red Banner Textile Factory =

Factory in Saint Petersburg, Russia

Coordinates: 59°57′41″N 30°16′54″E

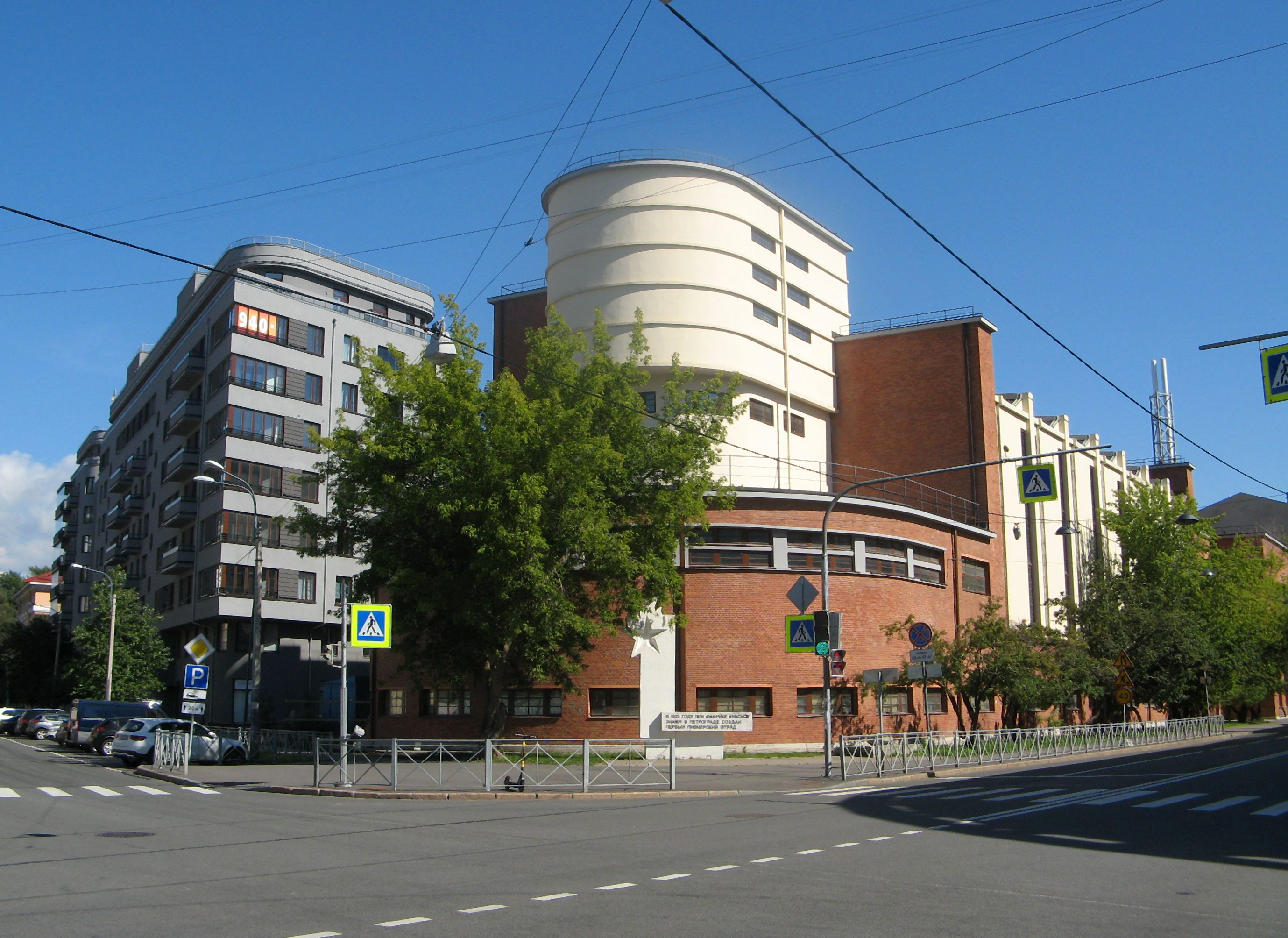
The power station of the Red Banner Factory

The Red Banner Textile Factory (Russian: Трикотажная фабрика «Красное Знамя»; Trikotazhnaya fabrika "Krasnoye Znamya") in St Petersburg, Pionerskaya ulitsa (Pioneers street), 53 was designed by Erich Mendelsohn and later partly redesigned by S. O. Ovsyannikov, E. A. Tretyakov, and Hyppolit Pretreaus (the senior architect of the project). Built in 1926–1937.

Mendelsohn was the first foreign architect in 1925 to be asked to design in the USSR, on the basis of his dynamic, futuristic Expressionist architecture. A model was made of a large factory, similar though more functionalist in appearance to his earlier Luckenwalde hat factory. Mendelsohn made several trips to the USSR during its construction. He was inspired by the country's Constructivist architecture, and wrote a study entitled Russland-Europa-Amerika. However, the primitive construction techniques of the time were insufficient to realise the structure in full, and liberties were taken with Mendelsohn's design.

Mendelsohn participated only in the first stage of the project in 1925–1926. He drew an initial (later modified) plan of the factory and designed the power station of the factory, officially recognized as an object of Russian historical and cultural heritage (built in 1926). The other buildings were completed by S. O. Ovsyannikov, E. A. Tretyakov, and Hyppolit Pretreaus in 1926—1928 and 1934—1937. Now the entire complex of buildings of this factory is included in the List of newly revealed objects of historical and cultural heritage, issued by the government of Saint-Petersburg in 2001 (with additions of 2006).

Mendelsohn disowned the building after its completion in 1926, although he would frequently make use of the model as an example of his approach to industrial architecture. The factory is still partly in use as storage space.

After many years of abandonment and decay, by 2017 the chimney seen in the picture above had been removed, and plants are growing on the roof. With a change of ownership, by early 2018 the exterior had been restored. In mid 2019 the unrestored interior was open for tours.
