= Shrubs Wood =

Coordinates: 51.6377°N 0.5490°W

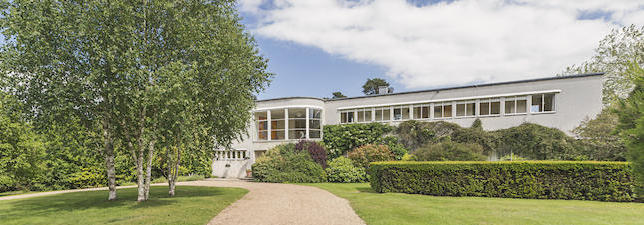
Shrubs Wood c.2015

Shrubs Wood is a privately owned, Grade II* listed, Art Deco country house in Chalfont St Peter, Buckinghamshire, England. Built between 1933 and 1934, Shrubs Wood was designed by Erich Mendelsohn and Serge Chermayeff. It is one of only two residential properties designed during their short partnership (the other is Cohen House in Chelsea, London).

Shrubs Wood is notable for its exterior, staircase and integrated furniture. It is unique as a Modernist interpretation of the traditional English country house and is considered an important example of "mature" Modernism. Shrubs Wood was originally named Nimmo House, before being renamed by Bridget D'Oyly Carte when she bought the property in 1949.

Shrubs Wood has been used as a location for period film and TV series such as Agatha Christie's Marple, Agatha Christie's Poirot, Midsomer Murders, Jonathan Creek and Endeavour.
