= Mendelsohn House =

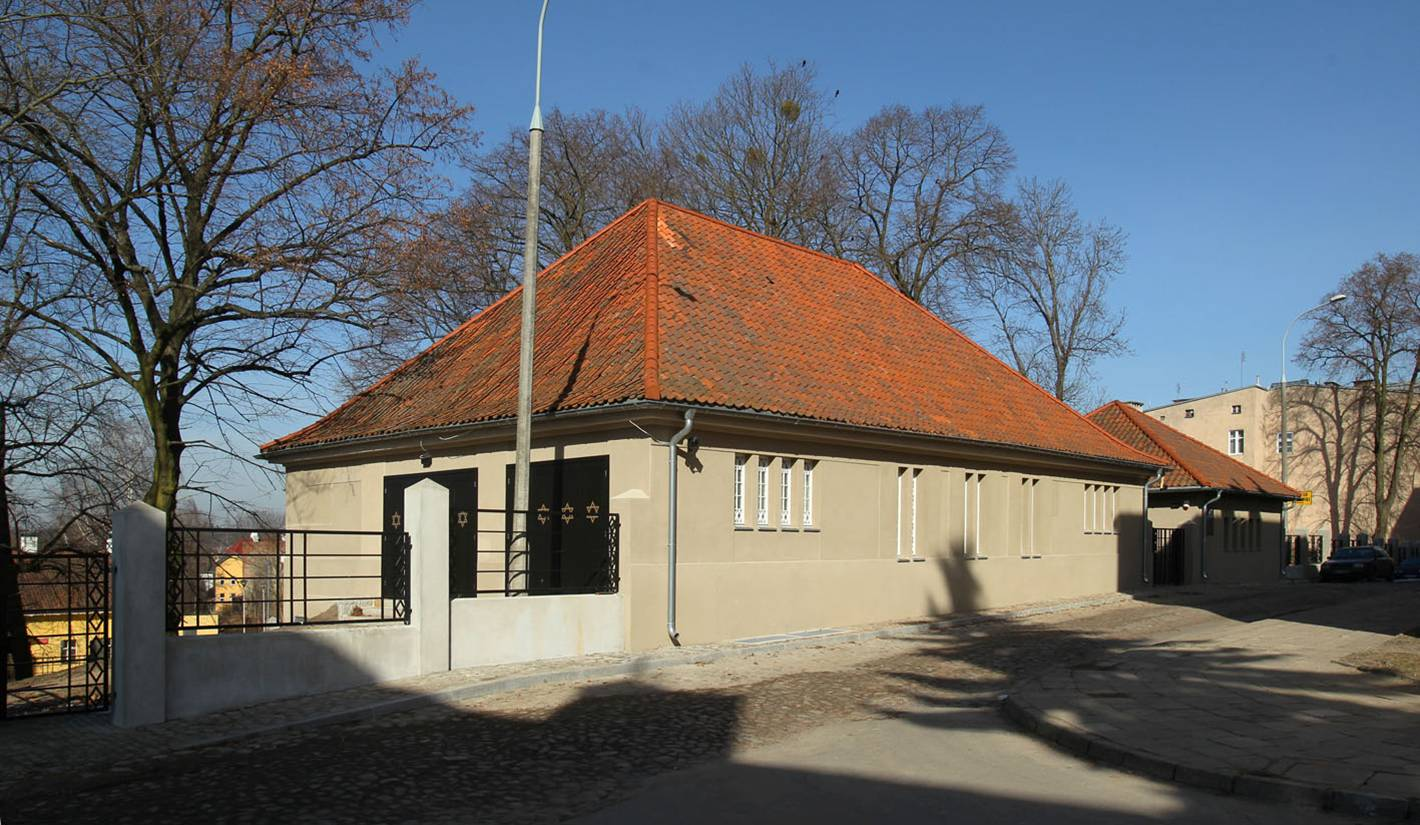
- The Mendelsohn House (2012)
- Interactive map of the Mendelsohn House area

General information
- Location: ul. Zyndrama z Maszkowic, Olsztyn, Poland
- Coordinates: 53°46′31″N 20°28′06″E
- Completed: 1913

Design and construction
- Architect: Erich Mendelsohn

The Mendelsohn House (Polish: Dom Mendelsohna) is a former Jewish Tahara house (Bet Tahara) in Olsztyn, Poland, today used as a center for intercultural dialogue. It also includes a gatehouse.

== Tahara House ==
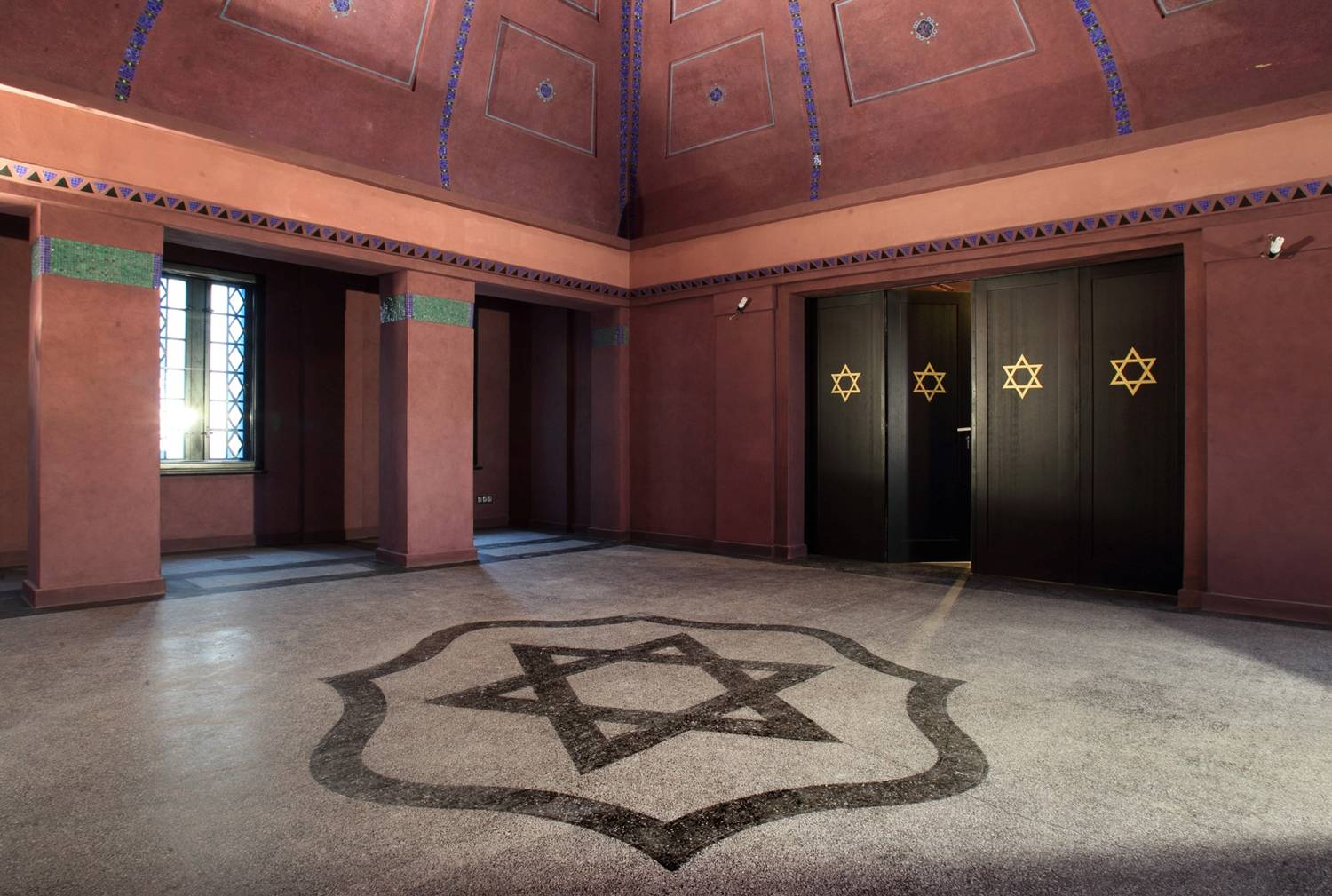
The central hall

The Tahara house, completed in 1913, was the first buildings designed by Erich Mendelsohn and the only one in his hometown of Allenstein. The Bet Tahara was built from 1911 to 1912 as a component of the Jewish cemetery of Allenstein that was already existing since 1818. Mendelsohn create this project during his studies at the Munich Technical University, and had the chance to realize it.

A smaller gatehouse, the residence of the cemetery's gardener, is part of the complex. The passage between both buildings was used as the main entrance of the cemetery. The structure was influenced by Joseph Maria Olbrich's architecture.

The circumstances of Mendelsohn's commissioning remain unclear. The commissioning was probably influenced by Mendelsohn's father, a venerable member of the Jewish community of Allenstein. The house was equipped with rooms for the ritual washing of the corpses, a mourning hall and a mortuary leading to the adjacent Jewish cemetery. The interior is dominated by the central hall, a pyramidal wooden dome with mosaic decoration. A frieze with Hebrew lettering decorates the room. The design is only partially characterized by Jewish symbolism, simplified geometric elements show the influence of Art Nouveau and expressionism.

With the rise of Adolf Hitler in Germany, the cemetery was defiled by the Nazis in early 1936 but was not directly affected by the Kristallnacht riots of 1938. In 1943 the state of construction of the building was described as good, the gatehouse was still inhabited.

In 1939 Allenstein's Jewish community counted 138 members (448 in 1933) In summer 1942 the Germans deported the Jews of Allenstein to the Minsk Ghetto and Theresienstadt and murdered them in the Holocaust. The Jewish community of Allenstein ceased to exist.

== Municipal archive ==
After World War II the region became part of Poland. The use of the building during the immediate post war years is unknown.

After an anti-semitic campaign in Poland the remains of the cemetery were levelled to the ground in 1968 and the building was used as a magazine by the municipal archive of Olsztyn until 1996. Construction drawings of 1971 show several significant changes like the installation of a staircase between the main floor and the basement. This alteration resulted in the loss of most wall decorations, original floors in the wings and the original ceiling. New concrete floors destroyed the frieze in the main hall.

== Reconstruction ==
In 2005, Borussia (Fundacja Borussia) and Association of Olsztyn’s Fancies initiated the reconstruction of the building which began in 2008. Borussia is a Polish Foundation founded in 1990 and dedicated to the unbiased research of East Prussian heritage in the area, which had been tabooed for decades in Communist Poland. The restoration project was made with the support of European Founds ("Operation Program Warmia and Mazury 2007-2013)

The building and the adjacent cemetery were acquired by the Foundation for the Preservation of Jewish Heritage in Poland. Since 21 March 2013, the 126th anniversary of the Mendelsohn's birth, the building has been used as a center for intercultural dialogue by the "Borussia" Foundation and was named Mendelsohn House (Dom Mendelsohna) in memory of its architect.

The gatehouse hosts the Borussia's offices, and Mendelsohn House is used for concerts, expositions, workshops and tourism.

== Description of the buildings ==
The Mendelsohn House is a beautiful couple of Jewish buildings that were used to prepare Jewish burial ceremonies. Its history is deeply linked to the Jewish culture and the search for information leads automatically to the Jewish habits and tradition.

In the Jewish culture the body is always hidden from the public and it is washed and dressed by a group of people, the Chevra Kadisha, that conduct this ceremony as volunteers. The Chevra Kadisha, the sacred society, is a group of pious men and women who have taken on the obligation of ritually preparing the deceased. They perform the Taharah, which means purification. These people ritually bathe the deceased and then dress the person in Tachrichim, shrouds, the Traditional burial garments. The Mendelsohn House has been shaped to be the perfect spot to organize and complete these tasks.

The entrance of the first building was divided into three small rooms one adjacent to the others. The door led into the central room and at the left there was the bathing chamber where the dead bodies were washed following the Jewish rules. This ceremony was private, that's why the room was closed by walls, now the walls don't exist anymore, but it is still possible to see their marks on the floor and on the other main walls. The decoration of this room has been deduced from some small pieces of the original plaster and mosaic that during the years have been covered with new layers of plaster and colors. The care that Mendelsohn took to design this room probably reflects the importance that it had: the corners where the walls meet the ceiling are rounded and the ceramics on the bottom part of the walls are of a bright white, the upper part has been designed by blue rectangles and lines that create the boundaries of big parts of plaster. Probably in the center of each square there was a decoration but, due to the horrible condition of the building (between 1996-2006) and the works that had been made before the restoration, it is impossible to clearly understand the shape, it is just possible to see some blue small dots.

At the other side of the main chamber there is what was thought to be one room, but it was discovered later that it was divided in two. The real function of this spot is unclear, it could probably be two dressing rooms for the Chevra Kadisha members: there is an exhaust pipe (there is one also in the washing chamber) that could be used to warm up the water. Strangely the pipes are completely clean.

The central room, the atrium, is in between the washing chamber and the dressing rooms and it is the first room after the entrance. With a dark pavement and dark purple walls, it could be the metaphorical entrance into the death.

The most important room it is, without doubts, the consecration hall. This room was the one where the ceremony used to take place. The big central space is enclosed by a gallery, three columns at each side describe two small corridors illuminated by three windows. The original white floor is decorated by a black Star of David in the center, that corresponds perfectly to the center of the dome. All the way around the gallery there was the Hebrew inscription "And if thou draw out thy soul to the hungry, and satisfy the afflicted soul; then shall the light rise in the obscurity, and thy darkness be as noon day" from the Isaiah's book 58:10. We know about this particular because Mendelsohn himself took some photos and kept them in his archives. In one of them it is clearly readable part of this verse.

Extremely important is the roof, probably the finest expression of the Mendelsohn's genial mind. The Jewish law states that the Koheni (the Priest) and the dead body can't be under the same roof. Mendelsohn found a special solution to this problem: he built two domes one in the other, where the internal one do not touch the external one, creating this way two roofs. While the external one creates the shape of the entire building, the internal one gives personality to the central room. Of square shape, the dome rise up decorated by blue and green mosaics that, from the bottom the line where the ornament with the Isaish's book quotation was to the peak of the roof, design lines and patterns. At the peak, in correspondence of the Star of David of the floor, there is another Star of David, smaller, but far brighter, made of golden pieces. The contrast between the soft and the dark parts of the mosaic makes the golden parts even shiner of how they effectively are, creating a spot of light right in the center of the dome. It is now possible to observe the structure of the domes by going upstairs where some windows have been created to show visitors the Mendlsohn’s architectural trick.

The last room is at the opposite side of the commemoration room and it can be defined as the Koheni room. This chamber was divided in three, now is an open space. The central part was probably the spot where the body was taken and placed on the chariot that would lead the body to the cemetery, passing thought a big door where on the top was written in Hebrew "For surely there is an end; and thin expectation shall not be cut off" from the Proverbs' book 23:18. The left part was the room where the Kohenim prepared themselves for the ceremony, there is, in fact, another door, probably the priest-door, because the Kohenim are not allowed to pass from the same door as dead body.
