= Weizmann House =

Coordinates: 31°54′23.23″N 34°49′6.83″E

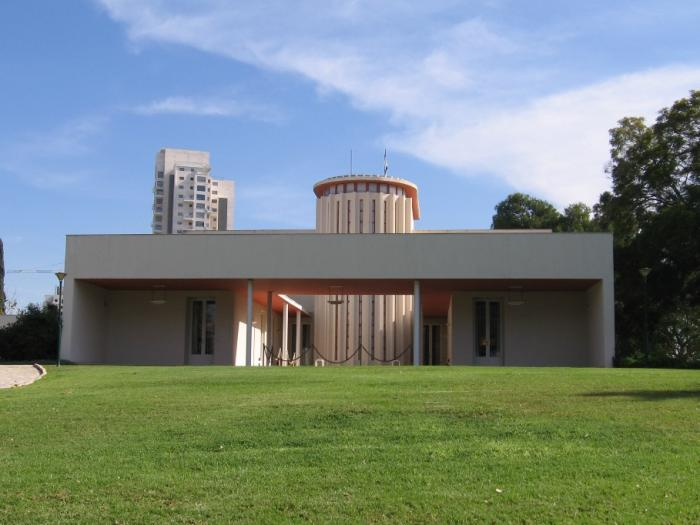
View of the entrance to the Weizmann House

The Weizmann House (Hebrew: בית ויצמן) was the home of the first President of Israel, Chaim Weizmann, and first First Lady, Vera Weizmann. The house sits atop a hill in Rehovot, and is now part of the Weizmann Institute of Science. The architect was Erich Mendelsohn.

== History ==
In 1934 Chaim Weizmann, who was then living in England, asked Mendelsohn to plan his house in Israel — after hearing of Mendelsohn's project for Salman Schocken's house in Jerusalem. The design process was extensive and initiated a complicated relationship between Weizmann and Mendelsohn. Weizmann required a modest house, and when asked about the cost, Mendelsohn bid £20,000, which was nearly twice the amount Weizmann was ready to invest. The two corresponded for several months, with Mendelsohn trying to convince Weizmann that building the house according to his designs was a good decision: the costs were not to be spent on luxury, rather they would benefit the personal and official requirements of the Weizmanns. This correspondence continued until August 1935, when the two agreed on the program after long negotiation, especially with regard to the price. The building of the house took about a year, and the Weizmanns were able to take ownership in January 1937. The final cost after negotiations and construction was £14,832 6s 8d. Though this house was designed for the Weizmanns, they lived there only after the Second World War, several years after it was ready for them. When the Weizmanns were not home the house was lived in by visiting world leaders, luminaries, and guests. After the house was completed difficulties between the architect and clients continued: Chaim Weizmann was displeased with Mendelsohn over imperfections in the building such as dampness in the winter, and Vera Weizmann chose her own interior decoration over that of Mendelsohn. The house now displays the art and objects that the Weizmanns had collected.

The design of the house was met with praise early on. One guest, Blanche Dugdale, the niece of Arthur Balfour, described it as "a modern, aristocratic house, in harmony with its surroundings, well suited to its purpose, fully expressing the soul of its owners, and, like them, a national treasure." Beginning in 1949 until Chaim Weizmann's death three years later, the years Weizmann served as President of Israel, the house functioned as the official residence of the President.

The house was adapted into a museum in 1978 and was featured on an Israeli postage stamp in 1991. It underwent further renovations in 1999, during the presidency of the Weizmanns' nephew, Ezer Weizmann.

== Architecture ==
The house was designed in keeping with the international style though many aspects distinguish it from the style as a characteristic and original work of Erich Mendelsohn. Situated on 11 acres (45,000 m^{2}) of land, it was designed to be becoming of its site, climate, and landscape. From the top of a hill, the house has a commanding view of the coastal plain, a primary consideration in planning of the house. The structure is symmetrical, which is not common for its style. The form of the structure is simple and is designed to exacting proportions, which are highlighted by the use of clean forms. The structure is organized around a cylindrical stairwell, half facing the courtyard of the house with a pool in its center. Although courtyards enclosed on four sides are an architectural typology, in this case the front facade of the house blurs the boundary between the interior of the house, and the natural environment, both because of this openness to the landscape and the open space above through the roofing.

Mendelsohn designed a number of buildings in Israel in addition to the Weizmann house, including several buildings at the Sieff Institute which would later become the Weizmann Institute of Science, the Schocken house and library, Mount Scopus Hadassah Hospital, the first building for the Rambam Hospital, and the Anglo-Palestine Bank building, now the Bank Leumi in Jerusalem.

== Gardens ==
The gardens on the grounds of the complex are the resting place for Chaim and Vera Weizmann.

== Gallery ==
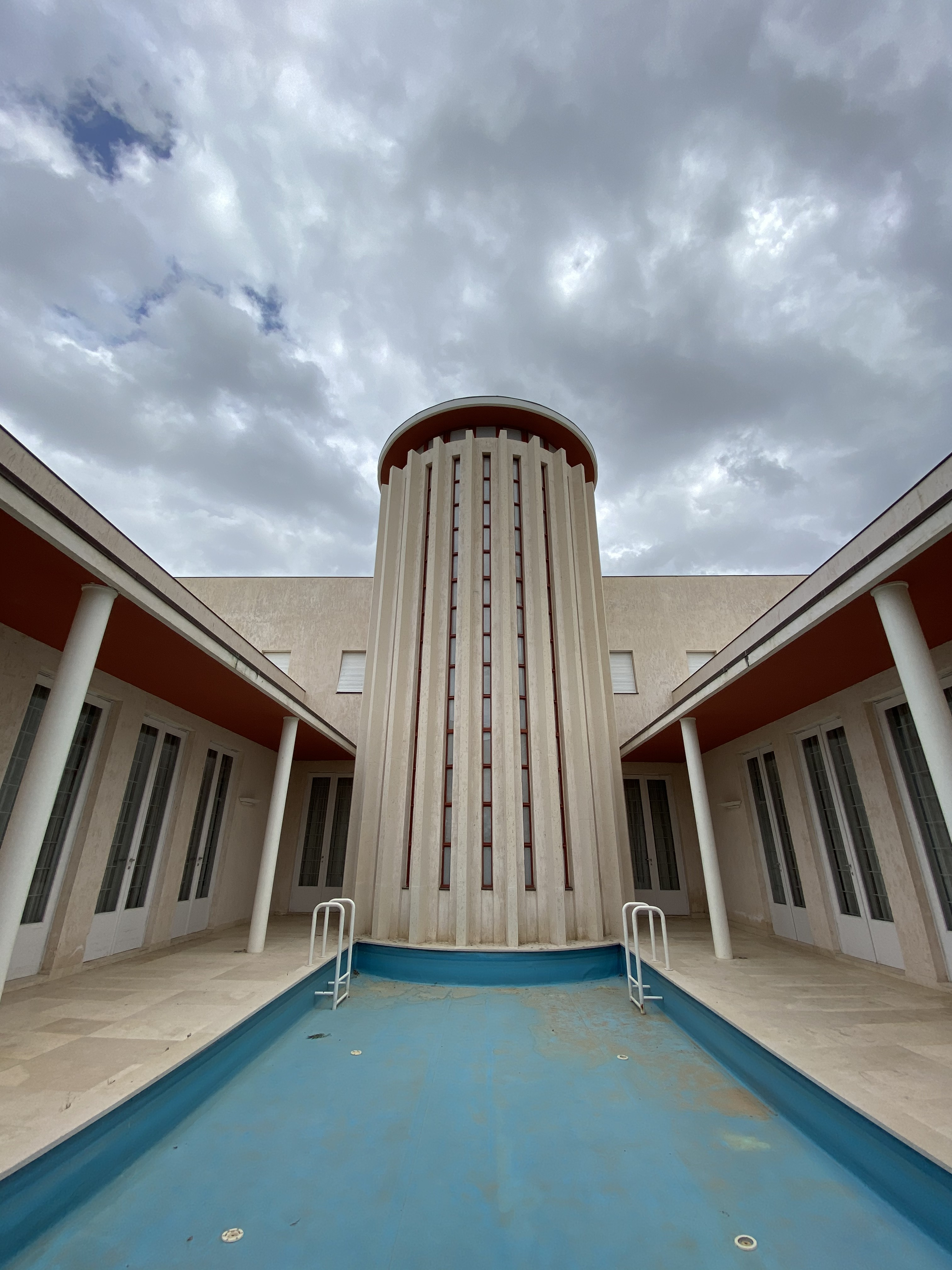
Weizmann Residence in 2021

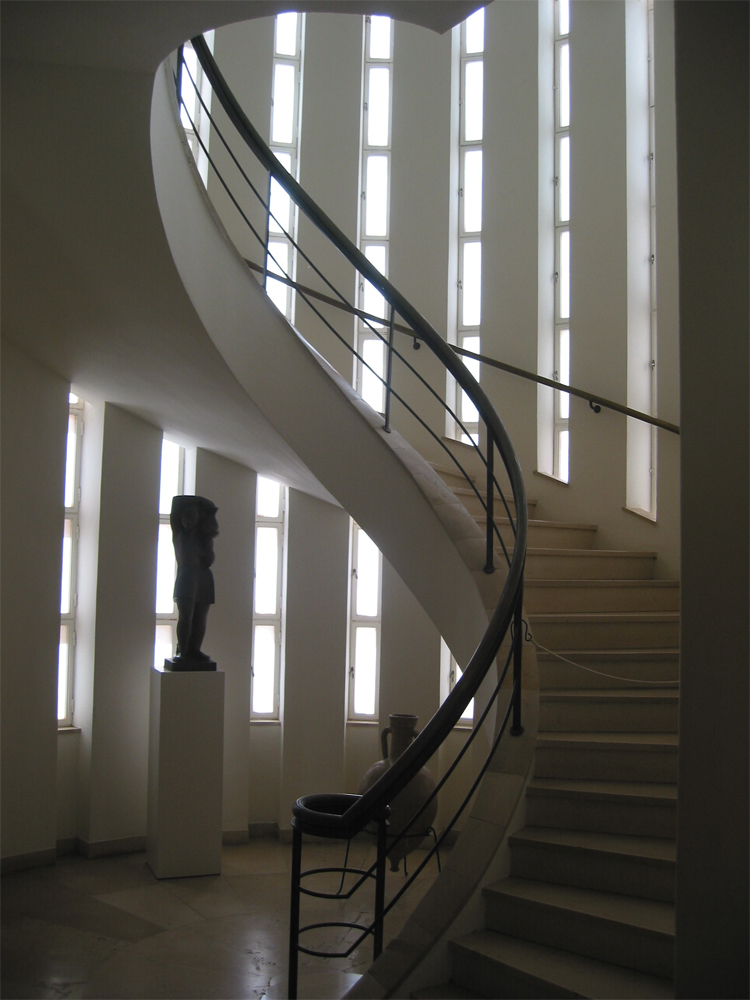
Interior view of the spiral staircase tower

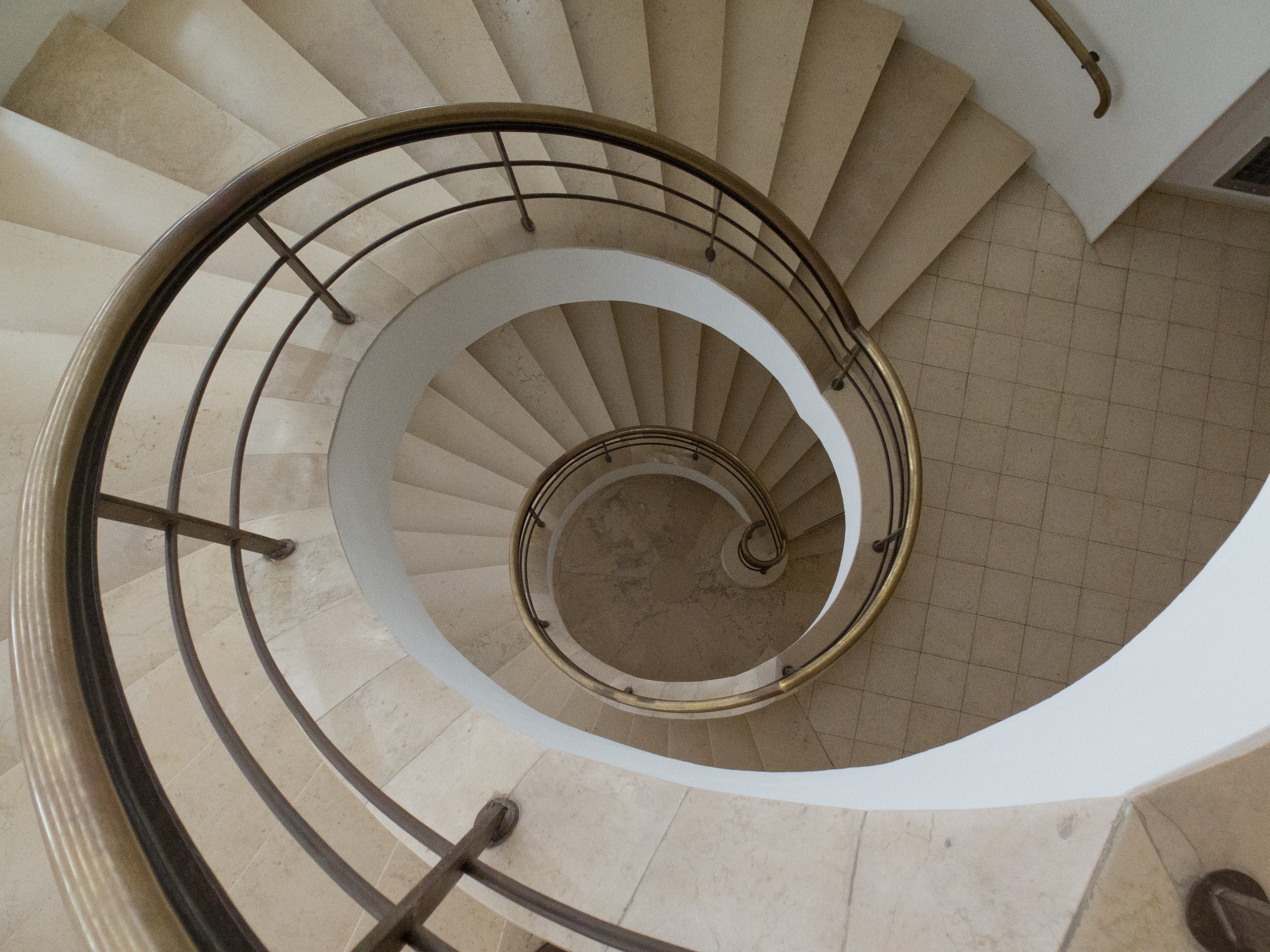
Interior view down spiral staircase tower

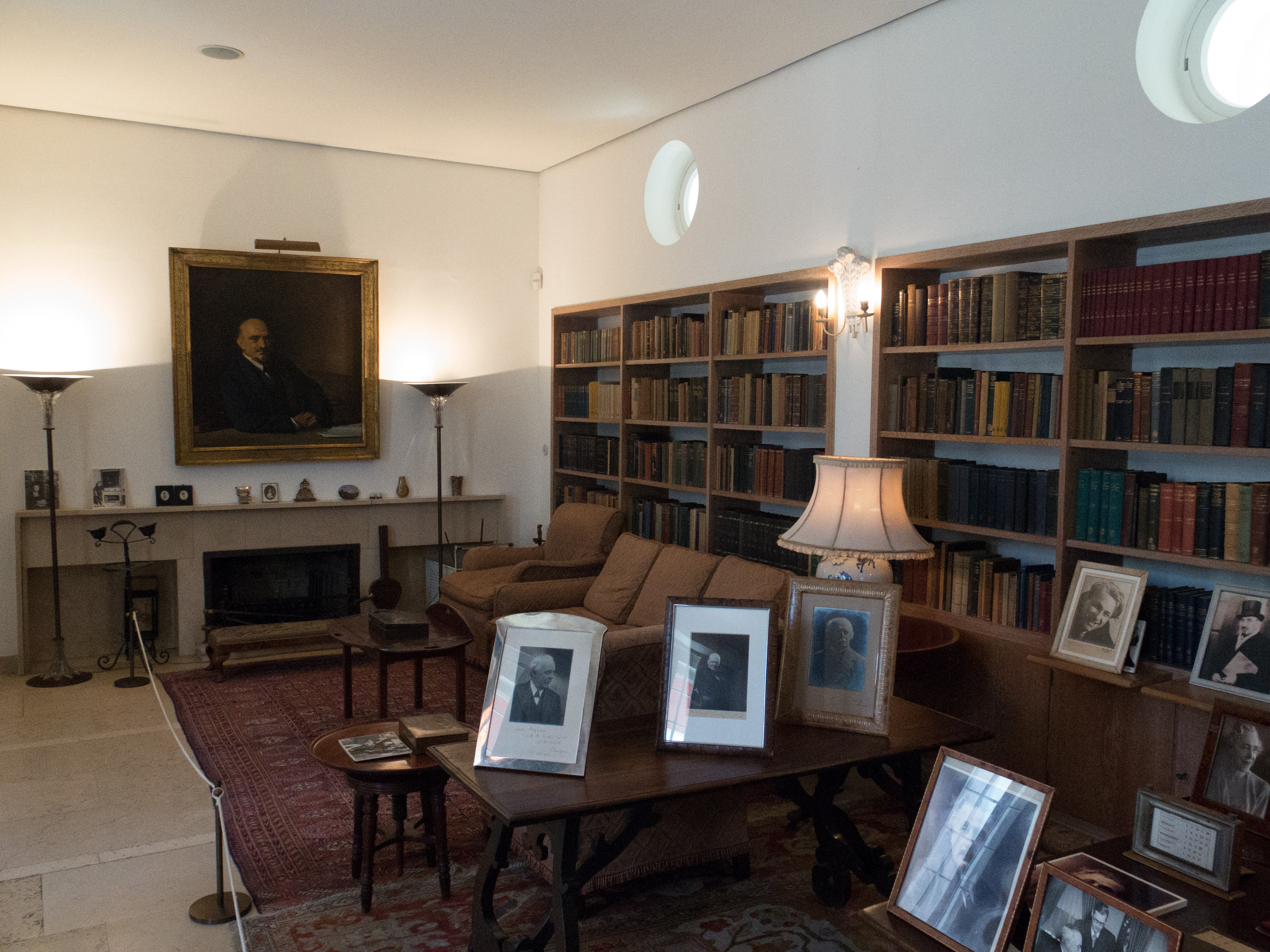
Library Weizmann House

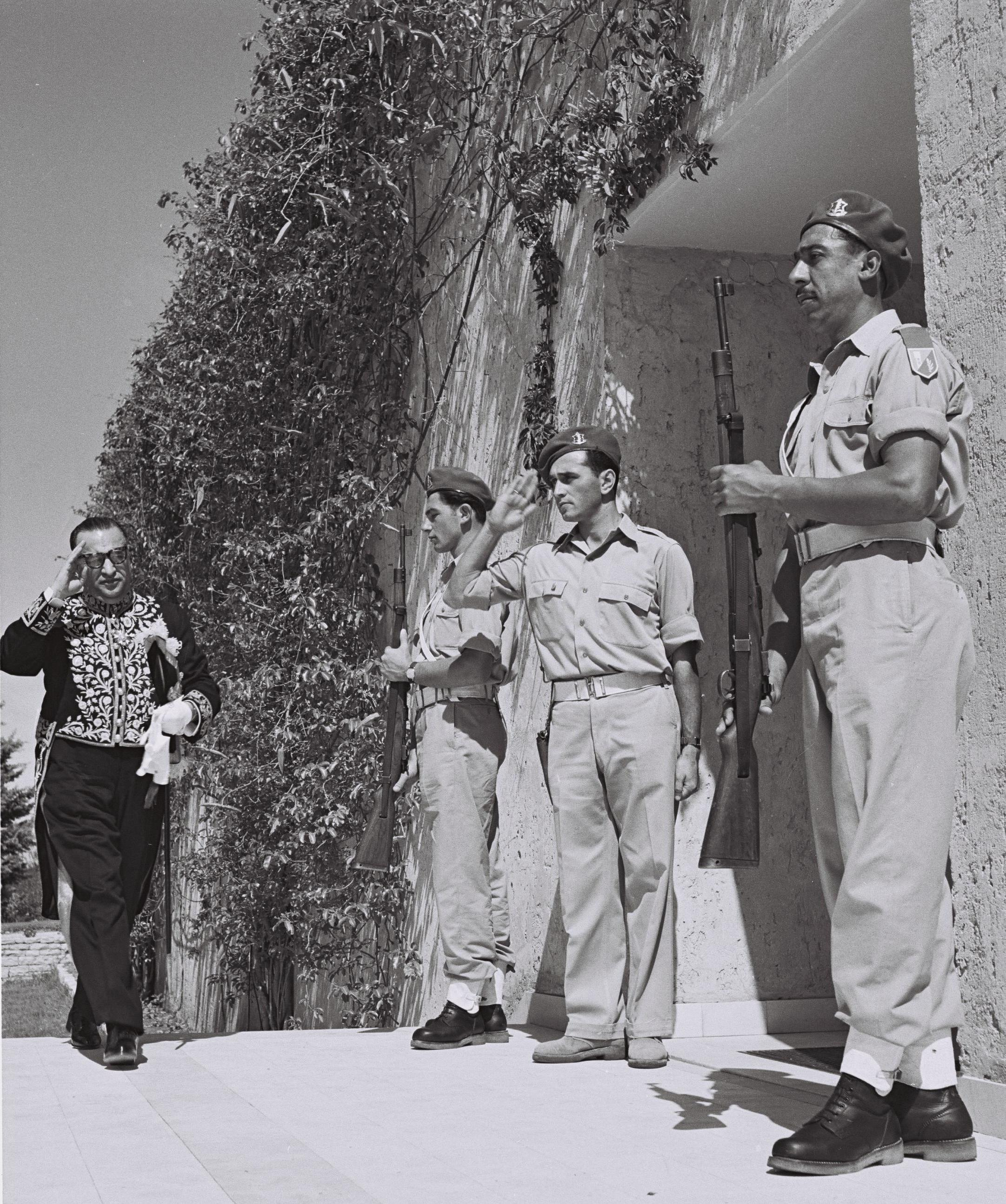
Iranian minister Reza Saffinia arriving at the Weizmann House, to greet Chaim Weizmann on Yom Ha'atzmaut, 1950
