= Tagblatt-Turm =

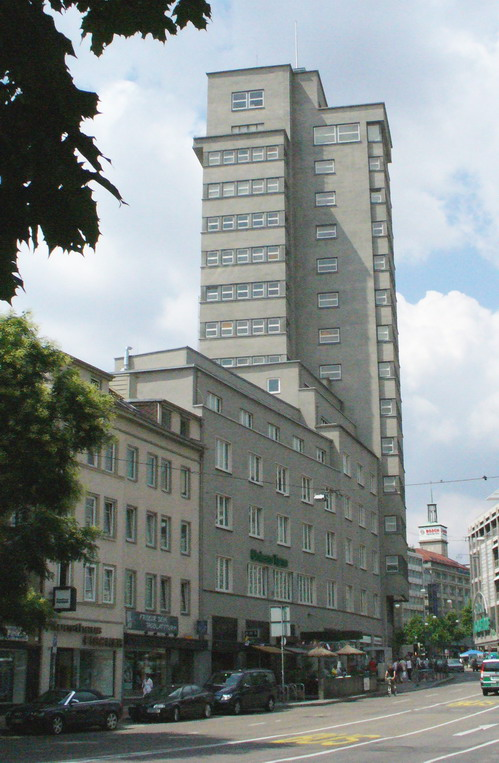
- Interactive map of the Tagblatt-Turm area

General information
- Type: Commercial offices
- Architectural style: Early Modernism
- Location: Eberhardstraße 61; Stuttgart, Germany
- Coordinates: 48°46′22″N 9°10′34″E
- Completed: 1924-1928

Height
- Roof: 61 m (200 ft)

Technical details
- Floor count: 16

Design and construction
- Architect: Ernst Otto Osswald
- Main contractor: Kübler AG

Tagblatt-Turm (English: Daily Newspaper Tower) is a 61 m (200 ft), the 16-storey high-rise building in Stuttgart, Baden-Württemberg, Germany.

The landmark Tagblatt-Turm was designed by architect Ernst Otto Oßwald, and is one of Germany's earliest high-rises, constructed between 1924 and 1928 and made from crushed stone and cement. Upon completion it was the tallest building in the city after the old 1905 city hall, and the highest office building in Germany. Its modern design caused controversy during construction, however, the building has since been recognized as a cultural and architectural landmark. The earliest high-rise office building erected from cement and steel was the Zeiss Building in Jena, built by the Dywidag company of Nuremberg in 1912 to house Zeiss' corporate headquarters.

From 1928 to 1943, the tower was the seat of the editorship and publishing house of the Stuttgarter Neues Tagblatt, a local newspaper; the building derives its name from this original tenant. After World War II until 1978, the tower served as the headquarters for the two newspapers Stuttgarter Zeitung and the Stuttgarter Nachrichten. In 2004, after extensive renovations, the tower was converted into a cultural center with several theatres under the name Kultur unterm Turm.
