= List of Cum Laude Society chapters =

The Cum Laude Society is an organization that honors academic achievement at secondary institutions. It was founded at the Tome School in 1906. Following is a list of Cum Laude Society chapters, with inactive institutions in italics.

Chapter	Charter date	Institution	Location	State or province	Status	Ref.
		Agnes Irwin School	Rosemont, Pennsylvania	PA	Active	
		The Albany Academy	Albany, New York	NY	Active	
		Albany Academy for Girls	Albany, New York	NY	Active	
		Albuquerque Academy	Albuquerque, New Mexico	NM	Active	
		All Saints Episcopal School	Tyler, Texas	TX	Active	
		Allendale Columbia School	Rochester, New York	NY	Active	
		American School of Madrid	Pozuelo de Alarcón, Madrid, Spain		Active	
		American School of Paris	Saint-Cloud, Île-de-France, France		Active	
		Anderson High School	Cincinnati, Ohio	OH	Active	
		Arendell Parrott Academy	Kinston, North Carolina	NC	Active	
		Athens Academy	Athens, Georgia	GA	Active	
		Augusta Preparatory Day School	Martinez, Georgia	GA	Active	
		Asheville School	Asheville, North Carolina	NC	Active	
		Avon Old Farms School	Avon, Connecticut	CT	Active	
		Bancroft School	Worcester, Massachusetts	MA	Active	
		The Barstow School	Kansas City, Missouri	MO	Active	
		Battle Ground Academy	Franklin, Tennessee	TN	Active	
		Baylor School	Chattanooga, Tennessee	TN	Active	
		Beaver Country Day School	Chestnut Hill, Massachusetts	MA	Active	
		Belmont Hill School	Belmont, Massachusetts	MA	Active	
		The Benjamin School	Palm Beach County, Florida	FL	Active	
		Berkeley Carroll School	Park Slope, New York City, New York	NY	Active	
		Berkeley Preparatory School	Tampa, Florida	FL	Active	
		Berkshire School	Sheffield, Massachusetts	MA	Active	
		Berwick Academy	South Berwick, Maine	ME	Active	
		Bexley High School	Bexley, Ohio	OH	Active	
		Birch Wathen Lenox School	Manhattan, New York City, New York	NY	Active	
		The Bishop's School	La Jolla, California	CA	Active	
		Blair Academy	Blairstown, New Jersey	NJ	Active	
		The Blake School	Hopkins, Minnesota	MN	Active	
		The Branson School	Ross, California	CA	Active	
		Brentwood School	Los Angeles, California	CA	Active	
		Breck School	Golden Valley, Minnesota	MN	Active	
		Brookfield Academy	Brookfield, Wisconsin	WI	Active	
	before December 1908	Brooklyn Collegiate and Polytechnic Institute	Brooklyn, New York	NY	Inactive	(Note: In 1917, the preparatory program separated from the institute and became the Polytechnic Preparatory Country Day School. The institute is now the New York University Tandon School of Engineering/) (Note: Was originally a chapter of Alpha Delta Tau.)
		Brooks School	North Andover, Massachusetts	MA	Active	
		Brookstone School	Columbus, Georgia	GA	Active	
		Brunswick School	Greenwich, Connecticut	CT	Active	
		Bryn Mawr School	Baltimore, Maryland	MD	Active	
		Buckingham Browne & Nichols School	Cambridge, Massachusetts	MA	Active	
		Buffalo Seminary	Buffalo, New York	NY	Active	
		Byram Hills High School	Armonk, New York	NY	Active	
		Campbell Hall School	Studio City, Los Angeles, California	CA	Active	
		Cannon School	Concord, North Carolina	NC	Active	
		Canterbury School	Fort Wayne, Indiana	IN	Active	
		Canterbury School	St. Petersburg, Florida	FL	Active	
		Cape Cod Academy	Osterville, Massachusetts	MA	Active	
		Cape Henry Collegiate School	Virginia Beach, Virginia	VA	Active	
	2019	Carrollwood Day School	Tampa, Florida	FL	Active	
		Casady School	Oklahoma City, Oklahoma	OK	Active	
		Castilleja School	Palo Alto, California	CA	Active	
		Cate School	Carpinteria, California	CA	Active	
	before December 1908	Centenary Collegiate Institute	Hackettstown, New Jersey	NJ	Inactive	(Note: Centenary Collegiate Institute became Centenary Junior College in 1940 and is now Centenary University.)
		Chadwick School	Palos Verdes Peninsula, California	CA	Active	
		Chagrin Falls High School	Chagrin Falls, Ohio	OH	Active	
		Charles Wright Academy	University Place, Washington	WA	Active	
		Charlotte Country Day School	Charlotte, North Carolina	NC	Active	
		Charlotte Latin School	Charlotte, North Carolina	NC	Active	
		Chase Collegiate School	Waterbury, Connecticut	CT	Active	
		Chatham Hall	Chatham, Virginia	VA	Active	
		Cherry Hill High School East	Cherry Hill, New Jersey	NJ	Active	
		Choate Rosemary Hall	Wallingford, Connecticut	CT	Active	
		Christ Church Episcopal School	Greenville, South Carolina	SC	Active	
		Cincinnati Country Day School	Indian Hill, Ohio	OH	Active	
		Cistercian Preparatory School	Irving, Texas	TX	Active	
		Classical High School	Providence, Rhode Island	RI	Active	
		The College Preparatory School	Oakland, California	CA	Active	
		Collegiate School	Manhattan, New York	NY	Active	
		Collegiate School	Richmond, Virginia	VA	Active	
		Collierville High School	Collierville, Tennessee	TN	Active	
		Columbus Academy	Gahanna, Ohio	OH	Active	
		Columbus School for Girls	Bexley, Ohio	OH	Active	
		Columbus Torah Academy	Columbus, Ohio	OH	Active	
		Community School of Naples	Naples, Florida	FL	Active	
		The Covenant School	Charlottesville, Virginia	VA	Active	
		Cranbrook Schools	Bloomfield Hills, Michigan	MI	Active	
		Crystal Springs Uplands School	Hillsborough, California	CA	Active	
		Culver Academies	Culver, Indiana	IN	Active	
		Cushing Academy	Ashburnham, Massachusetts	MA	Active	
		Dana Hall School	Wellesley, Massachusetts	MA	Active	
		Darlington School	Rome, Georgia	GA	Active	
		Deerfield Academy	Deerfield, Massachusetts	MA	Active	
		Detroit Country Day School	Beverly Hills, Michigan	MI	Active	
		Doane Academy	Burlington, New Jersey	NJ	Active	
		Durham Academy	Durham, North Carolina	NC	Active	
		Dwight-Englewood School	Englewood, New Jersey	NJ	Active	
		Edgemont High School	Edgemont, New York	NY	Active	
		Elgin Academy	Elgin, Illinois	IL	Active	(Note: The school closed at the end of the 2023-2024 year.)
		The Ellis School	Pittsburgh, Pennsylvania	PA	Active	
		Emma Willard School	Troy, New York	NY	Inactive	
		Episcopal Academy	Newtown Square, Pennsylvania	PA	Active	
		Episcopal Collegiate School	Little Rock, Arkansas	AR	Active	
		Episcopal High School	Alexandria, Virginia	VA	Active	
		Episcopal School of Dallas	Dallas, Texas	TX	Active	
		Episcopal School of Jacksonville	Jacksonville, Florida	FL	Active	
		Ethel Walker School	Simsbury, Connecticut	CT	Active	
	before December 1908	Evanston Academy	Evanston, Illinois	IL	Inactive	(Note: The academy closed in 1917.)
		Father Ryan High School	Nashville, Tennessee	TN	Active	
		Flint Hill School	Oakton, Virginia	VA	Active	
		Flintridge Preparatory School	La Cañada Flintridge, California	CA	Active	
		Forsyth Country Day School	Lewisville, North Carolina	NC	Active	
		Fort Worth Country Day School	Fort Worth, Texas	TX	Active	
		Fountain Valley School of Colorado	Colorado Springs, Colorado	CO	Active	
		Foxcroft School	Middleburg, Virginia	VA	Active	
		Francis Parker School	San Diego, California	CA	Active	
		Franklin Road Academy	Nashville, Tennessee	TN	Active	
		Friends Academy	Glen Cove, New York	NY	Active	
		Friends' Central School	Wynnewood, Pennsylvania	PA	Active	
		Friends School of Baltimore	Baltimore, Maryland	MD	Active	
		Fuqua School	Farmville, Virginia	VA	Active	
		Garrison Forest School	Owings Mills, Maryland	MD	Active	
		Georgetown Visitation Preparatory School	Washington, D.C.	DC	Active	
		Germantown Academy	Fort Washington, Pennsylvania	PA	Active	
		Gill St. Bernard's School	Somerset County, New Jersey	NJ	Active	
		Gilman School	Baltimore, Maryland	MD	Active	
		Gilmour Academy	Gates Mills, Ohio	OH	Active	
		Girls Preparatory School	Chattanooga, Tennessee	TN	Active	
		Glenbrook South High School	Glenview, Illinois	IL	Active	
		Glenelg Country School	Howard County, Maryland	MD	Active	
		Gould Academy	Bethel, Maine	ME	Active	
		The Governor's Academy	Byfield, Massachusetts	MA	Active	
		Granville High School	Granville, Ohio	OH	Active	
		Greenhill School	Addison, Texas	TX	Active	
		Greenhills School	Ann Arbor, Michigan	MI	Active	
		Greens Farms Academy	Greens Farms, Connecticut	CT	Active	
		Greensboro Day School	Greensboro, North Carolina	NC	Active	
		Greenwich Academy	Greenwich, Connecticut	CT	Active	
		Gulliver Preparatory School	Kendall, Florida	FL	Active	
		The Frederick Gunn School	Washington, Connecticut	CT	Active	
		Hackley School	Tarrytown, New York	NY	Active	
		Hall High School	Little Rock, Arkansas	AR	Active	
		Hamden Hall Country Day School	Hamden, Connecticut	CT	Active	
		Hammond School	Columbia, South Carolina	SC	Active	
		Hampton Roads Academy	Newport News, Virginia	VA	Active	
		Harpeth Hall School	Nashville, Tennessee	TN	Active	
		Harvard-Westlake School	Los Angeles, California	CA	Active	
		Hathaway Brown School	Shaker Heights, Ohio	OH	Active	
	1930	Haverford School	Haverford, Pennsylvania	PA	Active	
		Hawaii Preparatory Academy	Kamuela, Hawaii	HI	Active	
		Hawken School	Gates Mills, Ohio	OH	Active	
		Head-Royce School	Oakland, California	CA	Active	
		Heathwood Hall Episcopal School	Columbia, South Carolina	SC	Active	
		Hebron Academy	Hebron, Maine	ME	Active	
		Heritage Hall School	Oklahoma City, Oklahoma	OK	Active	
		Hewitt School	New York City, New York	NY	Active	
		Highlands High School	Fort Thomas, Kentucky	KY	Active	
		The Hill School	Pottstown, Pennsylvania	PA	Active	
		Hockaday School	Dallas, Texas	TX	Active	
		Holderness School	Holderness, New Hampshire	NH	Active	
		Holland Hall School	Tulsa, Oklahoma	OK	Active	
		Holton-Arms School	Bethesda, Maryland	MD	Active	
		Holy Innocents' Episcopal School	Sandy Springs, Georgia	GA	Active	
		Hopkins School	New Haven, Connecticut	CT	Active	
		Horace Mann School	Bronx, New York City, New York	NY	Active	
		Hotchkiss School	Lakeville, Connecticut	CT	Active	
		Hun School of Princeton	Princeton, New Jersey	NJ	Active	
		Hutchison School	Memphis, Tennessee	TN	Active	
		International School Manila	Taguig, Metro Manila, Philippines	MM	Active	
		Iolani School	Honolulu, Hawaii	HI	Active	
		Irvington High School	Irvington, New York	NY	Active	
		Isidore Newman School	New Orleans, Louisiana	LA	Active	
		Jackson Academy	Jackson, Mississippi	MS	Active	
		Jackson Preparatory School	Flowood, Mississippi	MS	Active	
		The John Cooper School	The Woodlands, Texas	TX	Active	
		Kent Denver School	Cherry Hills Village, Colorado	CO	Active	
		Kent Place School	Summit, New Jersey	NJ	Active	
	1930	Kent School	Kent, Connecticut	CT	Active	
		Kents Hill School	Kents Hill, Maine	ME	Active	
		Kentucky Country Day School	Louisville, Kentucky	KY	Active	
		Kimball Union Academy	Meriden, New Hampshire	NH	Active	
		King School	Stamford, Connecticut	CT	Active	
		Kingswood Oxford School	West Hartford, Connecticut	CT	Active	
		The Kinkaid School	Piney Point Village, Texas	TX	Active	
		The Kiski School	Saltsburg, Pennsylvania	PA	Active	
		La Jolla Country Day School	University City, San Diego, California	CA	Active	
		La Jolla High School	San Diego, California	CA	Active	
		Laguna Blanca School	Santa Barbara and Montecito, California	CA	Active	
		Lake Forest Academy	Lake Forest, Illinois	IL	Active	
		Lake Forest High School	Lake Forest, Illinois	IL	Active	
		Lake Highland Preparatory School	Orlando, Florida	FL	Active	
		Landon School	Bethesda, Maryland	MD	Active	
		Latin School of Chicago	Chicago, Illinois	IL	Active	
		Laurel School	Shaker Heights, Ohio	OH	Active	
		Lausanne Collegiate School	Memphis, Tennessee	TN	Active	
		Lawrence Academy at Groton	Groton, Massachusetts	MA	Active	
		Lawrence Woodmere Academy	Woodmere, New York	NY	Active	
		Lawrenceville School	Lawrenceville, New Jersey	NJ	Active	
		Lincoln-Sudbury Regional High School	Sudbury, Massachusetts	MA	Active	
		Little Rock Central High School	Little Rock, Arkansas	AR	Active	
		Loomis Chaffee School	Windsor, Connecticut	CT	Active	
		Louisville Collegiate School	Louisville, Kentucky	KY	Active	
		Lovett School	Atlanta, Georgia	GA	Active	
		MacDuffie School	Granby, Massachusetts	MA	Active	
		Maclay School	Tallahassee, Florida	FL	Active	
		Mariemont High School	Mariemont, Ohio	OH	Active	
		Maret School	Washington, D.C.	DC	Active	
		Marin Academy	San Rafael, California	CA	Active	
		Marlborough School	Los Angeles, California	CA	Active	
		Mary Institute and St. Louis Country Day School	Ladue, Missouri	MO	Active	
		Marymount High School	Los Angeles, California	CA	Active	
		Masters School	Dobbs Ferry, New York	NY	Active	
		Maumee Valley Country Day School	Toledo, Ohio	OH	Active	
		The McCallie School	Chattanooga, Tennessee	TN	Active	
		McDonogh School	Owings Mills, Maryland	MD	Active	
		The Meadows School	Las Vegas, Nevada	NV	Active	
		Memphis University School	Memphis, Tennessee	TN	Active	
	1930	Mercersburg Academy	Mercersburg, Pennsylvania	PA	Active	
		Metairie Park Country Day School	Metairie, Louisiana	LA	Active	
		Millbrook School	Stanford, New York	NY	Active	
		Milton Academy	Milton, Massachusetts	MA	Active	
		Miss Hall's School	Pittsfield, Massachusetts	MA	Active	
		Miss Porter's School	Farmington, Connecticut	CT	Active	
		Montclair Kimberley Academy	Montclair, New Jersey	NJ	Active	
		Montgomery Academy	Montgomery, Alabama	AL	Active	
		Moorestown Friends School	Moorestown, New Jersey	NJ	Active	
		Montgomery Bell Academy	Nashville, Tennessee	TN	Active	
		Montverde Academy	Montverde, Florida	FL	Active	
		Moravian Academy	Bethlehem and Allentown, Pennsylvania	PA	Active	
		Morgan Park Academy	Chicago, Illinois	IL	Active	
		Morristown–Beard School	Morristown, New Jersey	NJ	Active	
	1930	Moses Brown School	Providence, Rhode Island	RI	Active	
		Mounds Park Academy	Maplewood, Minnesota	MN	Active	
		Mount de Sales Academy	Macon, Georgia	GA	Active	
		Mt. Lebanon High School	Mt. Lebanon, Pennsylvania	PA	Active	
		Mount St. Mary Academy	Watchung, New Jersey	NJ	Active	
		National Cathedral School	Washington, D.C.	DC	Active	
		New Hampton School	New Hampton, New Hampshire	NH	Active	
		Newark Academy	Livingston, New Jersey	NJ	Active	
		Newton South High School	Newton, Massachusetts	MA	Active	
		Nichols School	Buffalo, New York	NY	Active	
		Nightingale-Bamford School	Manhattan, New York	NY	Active	
		Noble and Greenough School	Dedham, Massachusetts	MA	Active	
		Norfolk Academy	Norfolk, Virginia	VA	Active	
		North Cross School	Roanoke, Virginia	VA	Active	
		North Yarmouth Academy	Yarmouth, Maine	ME	Active	
		Northfield Mount Hermon School	Gill, Massachusetts	MA	Active	
		Northwood School	Lake Placid, New York	NY	Active	
		Notre Dame Preparatory School	Towson, Maryland	MD	Active	
		Oak Hall School	Gainesville, Florida	FL	Active	
		Oak Knoll School of the Holy Child	Summit, New Jersey	NJ	Active	
		Oak Park and River Forest High School	Oak Park, Illinois	IL	Active	
		The O'Neal School	Southern Pines, North Carolina	NC	Active	
Newman	2016	Oratory Preparatory School	Summit, New Jersey	NJ	Active	
		Out-of-Door Academy	Sarasota, Florida	FL	Active	
		Pace Academy	Atlanta, Georgia	GA	Active	
		Pacific Ridge School	Carlsbad, California	CA	Active	
		Packer Collegiate Institute	Brooklyn, New York City, New York	NY	Active	
		Parish Episcopal School	Dallas, Texas	TX	Active	
		Park Tudor School	Indianapolis, Indiana	IN	Active	
		Peddie School	Hightstown, New Jersey	NJ	Active	
		The Pembroke Hill School	Kansas City, Missouri	MO	Active	
		The Pennington School	Pennington, New Jersey	NJ	Active	
		Perkiomen School	Pennsburg, Pennsylvania	PA	Active	
	before December 1908	Phillips Academy	Andover, Massachusetts	MA	Active	
	before December 1908	Phillips Exeter Academy	Exeter, New Hampshire	NH	Active	
		Pine Crest School	Fort Lauderdale and Boca Raton, Florida	FL	Active	
		Pingree School	South Hamilton, Massachusetts	MA	Active	
		Pingry School	Short Hills, New Jersey	NJ	Active	
		Poly Prep Country Day School	Dyker Heights, Brooklyn, New York City, New York	NY	Active	
		Polytechnic School	Pasadena, California	CA	Active	
		Pomfret School	Pomfret, Connecticut	CT	Active	
		Portledge School	Matinecock, New York	NY	Active	
		Porter-Gaud School	Charleston, South Carolina	SC	Active	
		Portsmouth Abbey School	Portsmouth, Rhode Island	RI	Active	
		The Prairie School	Wind Point, Wisconsin	WI	Active	
		Princeton Day School	Princeton, New Jersey	NJ	Active	
		Principia School	Town and Country, Missouri	MO	Active	
		Providence Country Day School	East Providence, Rhode Island	RI	Active	
		Providence Day School	Charlotte, North Carolina	NC	Active	
		Pulaski Academy	Little Rock, Arkansas	AR	Active	
		Rabun Gap-Nacoochee School	Rabun Gap, Georgia	GA	Active	
		Randolph School	Huntsville, Alabama	AL	Active	
		Ranney School	Tinton Falls, New Jersey	NJ	Active	
		Ransom Everglades School	Coconut Grove, Florida	FL	Active	
		Ravenscroft School	Raleigh, North Carolina	NC	Actove	
		Rivers School	Weston, Massachusetts	MA	Active	
	1962	Roland Park Country School	Baltimore, Maryland	MD	Active	
		Roxbury Latin School	West Roxbury, Massachusetts	MA	Active	
		Rutgers Preparatory School	Franklin Township, New Jersey	NJ	Active	
		Sacramento Country Day School	Arden-Arcade, California	CA	Active	
		Sacred Heart Greenwich	Greenwich, Connecticut	CT	Active	(Note: Chapter formed at the Convent of the Sacred Heart, now called Sacred Heart Greenwich.)
		Saddle River Day School	Saddle River, New Jersey	NJ	Active	
		St. Albans School	Washington, D.C.	DC	Active	
		St. Andrew's Episcopal School	Potomac, Maryland	MD	Active	
		St. Andrew's Episcopal School	Ridgeland, Mississippi	MS	Active	
		Saint Andrew's School	Boca Raton, Florida	FL	Active	
		St. Andrew's-Sewanee School	Sewanee, Tennessee	TN	Active	
		St. Anne's-Belfield School	Charlottesville, Virginia	VA	Active	
		St. Catherine's School	Richmond, Virginia	VA	Active	
		Saint Edward's School	Vero Beach, Florida	FL	Active	
		St. George's Independent School	Memphis, Collierville, and Germantown, Tennessee	TN	Active	
		St. George's School	Middletown, Rhode Island	RI	Active	
		Saint George's School	Spokane, Washington	WA	Active	
		Saint James School	Hagerstown, Maryland	MD	Active	
		St. Johns Country Day School	Orange Park, Florida	FL	Active	
		Saint John's School	San Juan, Puerto Rico	PR	Active	
		St. John's School	Houston, Texas	TX	Active	
		St. Luke's School	New Canaan, Connecticut	CT	Active	
		St. Margaret's Episcopal School	San Juan Capistrano, California	CA	Active	
		St. Mark's School	Southborough, Massachusetts	MA	Active	
		St. Mark's School of Texas	Dallas, Texas	TX	Active	
		St. Martin's Episcopal School	Metairie, Louisiana	LA	Active	
		St. Mary's Episcopal School	Memphis, Tennessee	TN	Active	
		Saint Mary's Hall	San Antonio, Texas	TX	Active	
		St. Mary's School	Medford, Oregon	OR	Active	
		St. Paul Academy and Summit School	Saint Paul, Minnesota	MN	Active	
		St. Paul's School	Concord, New Hampshire	NH	Active	
		St. Paul's School for Boys	Brooklandville, Maryland	MD	Active	
		St. Paul's School for Girls	Brooklandville, Maryland	MD	Active	
		Saint Sebastian's School	Needham, Massachusetts	MA	Active	
		St. Stephen's & St. Agnes School	Alexandria, Virginia	VA	Active	
		St. Stephen's Episcopal School	Austin, Texas	TX	Active	
		Saint Stephen's Episcopal School	Bradenton, Florida	FL	Active	
		St. Timothy's School	Stevenson, Maryland	MD	Active	
		Salisbury School	Salisbury, Connecticut	CT	Active	
		Sanford School	Hockessin, Delaware	DE	Active	
		Santa Catalina School	Monterey, California	CA	Active	
		Santa Fe Preparatory School	Santa Fe, New Mexico	NM	Active	
		Savannah Country Day School	Savannah, Georgia	GA	Active	
		Seabury Hall	Makawao, Hawaii	HI	Active	
		Selwyn House School	Westmount, Quebec, Canada	QC	Active	
		Seven Hills School	Cincinnati, Ohio	OH	Active	
		Severn School	Severna Park, Maryland	MD	Active	
		Shady Side Academy	Pittsburgh, Pennsylvania	PA	Active	
		Shattuck-Saint Mary's	Faribault, Minnesota	MN	Active	
		Shorecrest Preparatory School	St. Petersburg, Florida	FL	Active	
		Sierra Canyon School	Los Angeles, California	CA	Active	
		South Kent School	South Kent, Connecticut	CT	Active	
		Spartanburg Day School	Spartanburg, South Carolina	SC	Active	
		Springside Chestnut Hill Academy	Philadelphia, Pennsylvania	PA	Active	
		Stevenson School	Pebble Beach, California	CA	Active	
		Stone Ridge School of the Sacred Heart	Bethesda, Maryland	MD	Active	
	1930	The Stony Brook School	Stony Brook, New York	NY	Active	
		Storm King School	Cornwall-on-Hudson, New York	NY	Active	
		Suffield Academy	Suffield, Connecticut	CT	Active	
		Tabor Academy	Marion, Massachusetts	MA	Active	
		Taft School	Watertown, Connecticut	CT	Active	
		Tampa Preparatory School	Tampa, Florida	FL	Active	
		Tatnall School	Wilmington, Delaware	DE	Active	
		TASIS England	Thorpe, Surrey, England		Active	
		TASIS Switzerland	Montagnola, Collina d'Oro, Switzerland		Active	
		The Thacher School	Ojai, California	CA	Active	
		Thayer Academy	Braintree, Massachusetts	MA	Active	
		Tilton School	Tilton, New Hampshire	NH	Active	
	1906	Tome School	Port Deposit, Maryland	MD	Inactive	(Note: The chapter was formed as the Alpha Delta Tau fraternity and emphasized both scholarship and other school activities.)
		Tower Hill School	Wilmington, Delaware	DE	Active	
		Trinity Preparatory School	Winter Park, Florida	FL	Active	
		Trinity School	New York City, New York	NY	Active	
		Trinity-Pawling School	Dutchess County, New York	NY	Active	
		Tupelo High School	Tupelo, Mississippi	MS	Active	
		UMS-Wright Preparatory School	Mobile, Alabama	AL	Active	
		University High School	Carmel, Indiana	IN	Active	
		University Lake School	Delafield, Wisconsin	WI	Active	
		University Liggett School	Grosse Pointe Woods, Michigan	MI	Active	
		University School	Shaker Heights and Hunting Valley, Ohio	OH	Active	
		University School of Milwaukee	Milwaukee, Wisconsin	WI	Active	
		University School of Nashville	Nashville, Tennessee	TN	Active	
		Upper Arlington High School	Upper Arlington, Ohio	OH	Active	
		Vermont Academy	Saxtons River, Vermont	VT	Active	
		Viewpoint School	Calabasas, California	CA	Active	
		Virginia Episcopal School	Lynchburg, Virginia	VA	Active	
		Walnut Hills High School	Cincinnati, Ohio	OH	Active	
		Walnut Hill School	Natick, Massachusetts	MA	Active	
		Wardlaw-Hartridge School	Edison, New Jersey	NJ	Active	
		Waterford School	Sandy, Utah	UT	Active	
		Watertown High School	Watertown, Massachusetts	MA	Active	
	June 14, 1910	Wayland Academy	Beaver Dam, Wisconsin	WI	Active	(Note: This was originally the Iota chapter of Alpha Delta Tau.)
		Waynflete School	Portland, Maine	ME	Active	
		The Webb School	Bell Buckle, Tennessee	TN	Active	
		Webb School of Knoxville	Knoxville, Tennessee	TN	Active	
		The Webb Schools	Claremont, California	CA	Active	
		The Wellington School	Upper Arlington, Ohio	OH	Active	
		Western Reserve Academy	Hudson, Ohio	OH	Active	
		The Westminster Schools	Atlanta, Georgia	GA	Active	
		Westridge School	Pasadena, California	CA	Active	
		Wheeler School	Providence, Rhode Island	RI	Active	
		Wichita Collegiate School	Wichita, Kansas	KS	Active	
		Wilbraham & Monson Academy	Wilbraham, Massachusetts	MA	Active	
	before December 1908	William Penn Charter School	Philadelphia, Pennsylvania	PA	Active	
		The Williams School	New London, Connecticut	CT	Active	
		Williston Northampton School	Easthampton, Massachusetts	MA	Active	
		Winchester Thurston School	Pittsburgh, Pennsylvania	PA	Active	
		Windward School	Los Angeles, California	CA	Active	
		Withrow High School	Cincinnati, Ohio	OH	Active	
		Woodberry Forest School	Woodberry Forest, Virginia	VA	Active	
		Wooster School	Danbury, Connecticut	CT	Active	
		Worcester Academy	Worcester, Massachusetts	MA	Active	
		Worcester Preparatory School	Berlin, Maryland	MD	Active	
		Wyoming Seminary	Kingston, Pennsylvania	PA	Active	
		York Country Day School	York, Pennsylvania	PA	Active	
