= History of the Jews in Ohio =

The history of Jews in Ohio dates back to 1817, when Joseph Jonas, a pioneer, came from England and made his home in Cincinnati. He drew after him a number of English Jews, who held Orthodox-style divine service for the first time in Ohio in 1819, and, as the community grew, organized themselves in 1824 into the first Jewish congregation of the Ohio Valley, the B'ne Israel. This English immigration was followed in the next two decades by the coming of German immigrants who, in contrast, were mostly Reform Jews. A Bavarian, Simson Thorman, settled in 1837 in Cleveland, then a considerable town, which thus became the second place in the state where Jews settled. Thorman was soon followed by countrymen of his, who in 1839 organized themselves into a congregation (the first in Cleveland, and the second in Ohio) called the Israelitish Society. The same decade saw an influx of German Jews into Cincinnati, and these in 1841 founded the Bene Yeshurun congregation. To these two communities the Jewish history of Ohio was confined for the first half of the 19th century. In 1850 Ohio had six congregations: four in Cincinnati and two in Cleveland.

As of 2012, Ohio has a Jewish population of 148,680, about 1.3% of the state.

== Population growth ==
After the middle of the 19th century, congregations sprang up throughout the state. In the statistics published by the Union of American Hebrew Congregations in September 1880, Ohio was credited with a Jewish population of 6,581, which seems to be too low an estimate. The number of Jews in Ohio in 1904 was supposed to be about 50,000. This estimate made the Jewish community of Ohio one of the largest in the country, surpassed in numerical strength only by New York, Pennsylvania, Illinois, and Massachusetts. The Jews of Ohio formed a little over 1 percent of the total population, which was 4,157,545.

== Distinguished Jews in 19th century Ohio ==
The Jews of Ohio have taken a significant part in the public life of the state. In the American Civil War, 1,004 Jews were enrolled from Ohio, a number exceeded only by the Jewish contingent of New York. This fact points also to the relative size of the Jewish community in Ohio at that time. One of these soldiers, Marcus M. Spiegel, rose from the ranks to a colonel, and but for his untimely death would have become a brigadier general, for which rank he had been recommended. Two others — David Orbansky and Abraham Greenawalt — received the Medal of Honor, the highest military decoration for gallantry in action.

In political life also the Jews have been active. Joseph Jonas, Jacob Wolf, William Bloch, Daniel Wolf, Caspar Lowenstein, Harry M. Hoffheimer, Fred A. Johnson, Frederick S. Spiegel, Charles Fleischmann, Henry Mack, Alfred M. Cohen, and Max Silverberg have served in the state legislature. Julius Freiburg was a member of the convention to change the constitution.

Jews have filled also many local offices, judicial and administrative, both through election and appointment. Of federal office-holders may be mentioned Nathaniel Newburgh, appointed by President Cleveland as appraiser of merchandise, and Bernhard Bettman, appointed by President McKinley as collector of internal revenue.

== Jewish communities in Ohio at the turn of the 20th century ==
According to the American Jewish Year Book of 5662 (1902), almost every town of importance had some Jewish organization. The two largest communities now had 12 congregations in Cincinnati and 14 in Cleveland. In 1901 18 cities and towns had one or more Jewish institutions, 16 of them having 50 regularly organized congregations. The following cities also had Jewish organizations as of 1902:

- Akron has the Akron Hebrew Congregation, organized in 1865 (rabbi, Isador Philo). It has also the Francis Joseph Society, a charitable organization, and an Orthodox congregation.
- Bellaire has three congregations, Agudath Achim founded in 1850 (rabbi, Becker), Moses Montefiore, and Sons of Israel, the last-named organized in 1896. It has further a Young Men's Hebrew Association, and a Ladies' Auxiliary Society.
- Canton has a congregation and a Hebrew Ladies' Aid Society.
- Chillicothe has a Jewish Relief Society. Religious services were also organized in town.
- Circleville has a congregation, Children of Israel.
- Columbus, the capital of the state, had in 1902 a Reform congregation, Temple Israel; and two Orthodox congregations, Agudas Achim (which became a Conservative congregation in the 21st century) and Beth Jacob.
- Dayton is also the seat of a considerable Jewish community. It has three congregations, Bnai Yeshurun, founded in 1854 (rabbi, David Lefkowitz), and two orthodox congregations, one of which, the House of Jacob (Rabbi Hillel Fox), was founded in 1886.
- Fremont, Ohio had a congregation known as the Fremont Hebrew Temple. By 1942 this congregation had merged with Beth Israel, a newer Jewish group.
- Hamilton's Congregation B'nai Israel (rabbi, L. Liebman) was founded in 1866.
- Ironton and Mansfield have each a congregation. In Mansfield, a Jewish presence can be dated to the 1840s.
- Lancaster was home to a Congregation called B'nai Israel, which purchased a permanent building in 1926.
- Lima has had an active Jewish population for over 150 years. It is home to Temple Beth Israel-Shaare Zedek. The congregation is composed of the previous Reform and Conservative congregations which merged in 1961. The Temple currently holds regular bi-monthly services but has no permanent rabbi as of January 2024.
- Marion has a Jewish Aid Society and a Hebrew Sabbath-school.
- Piqua's congregation, Anshe Emeth, was founded in 1858.
- Portsmouth's Congregation Bench Abraham (rabbi, Louis Kuppin), was organized in 1858 and included a Ladies' Hebrew Benevolent Society.
- Sandusky has one congregation, Temple Oheb Shalom
- Springfield has two congregations, Chesed Shel Emeth (rabbi, H. Arnofsky) and Ohev Zedakah (founded in 1866).
- Steubenville was the site of two congregations in 1900. By 1902, these two congregations merged under the name B'nai Israel.
- Toledo has one of the largest Jewish communities in Ohio. Its oldest religious institution is a chevra kadisha, Beni Israel, founded in 1867. It has three congregations, Bnai Israel (rabbi, Joseph Levin), Bnai Jacob (rabbi, Herz Benowitz); founded in 1870), and Shomer Emonim (rabbi, Charles Freund; founded in 1870, dissolved in 1874, and reorganized in 1884).
- Youngstown has two congregations, Children of Israel (rabbi, J. Friedman) and Rodef Sholem (rabbi, J. B. Grossman; organized in 1867). Youngstown has also a Ladies' Aid Society and a Hebrew Charity Society.
- Zanesville has two congregations, Beth Abraham and K'neseth Israel. Beth Abraham traced its history to 1874 and K'neseth Israel was formed in 1868.

High holiday services are held in Bowling Green, East Liverpool, Findlay and Marion. In addition, five cities have sections of the Council of Jewish Women, four have nine Zionist societies, and eight have fifty-two lodges (comp. "American Jewish Year Book," 5662, p. 146).

== Cleveland, Cincinnati, and Columbus ==
Today, roughly nine out of ten Ohio Jews live in the metropolitan areas of Cleveland, Cincinnati and Columbus, with community population estimates of 80,000 for Cleveland (as of 1996); 27,000 for Cincinnati (as of 2008); and 25,500 for Columbus (as of 2013).

These three cities are not only the most important numerically; they are the seats of the most prominent Jewish educational and charitable organizations and of the Jewish press of the state. Cleveland is home to the first Telshe Yeshiva in the United States, established in 1941 after the school was relocated out of Lithuania. In Cincinnati, the activity of Rabbi Isaac Mayer Wise and the founding of the Hebrew Union College there, as well as of the other major institutions of Reform Judaism such as the Union of American Hebrew Congregations, the Central Conference of American Rabbis, the Hebrew Sabbath-School Union, and the National Jewish Charities, made Ohio prominent in Jewish affairs nationally in the latter half of the 19th century. By the early 20th century, Cleveland, with its larger population swelled by immigration from eastern Europe, became the most prominent center for Jewish activities in the state. All of Ohio's statewide-elected Jewish politicians, most prominently U.S. Sen. Howard Metzenbaum, have hailed from the Cleveland area. By the end of the 20th century, Columbus was an increasingly important center of national Jewish prominence, driven by its population growth and by educational and cultural institutions such as Ohio State University's Melton Center and the Wexner Foundation.

See Jewish history in Cincinnati, Jews and Judaism in Cleveland and History of the Jews in Greater Columbus for further details.
