= Ross Friedman =

Ross Friedman may refer to:

- Ross the Boss (Ross Friedman (1954 - 2026), guitarist
- Ross Friedman (soccer) (born 1992), American soccer player
