= History of the Jews in Greater Columbus =

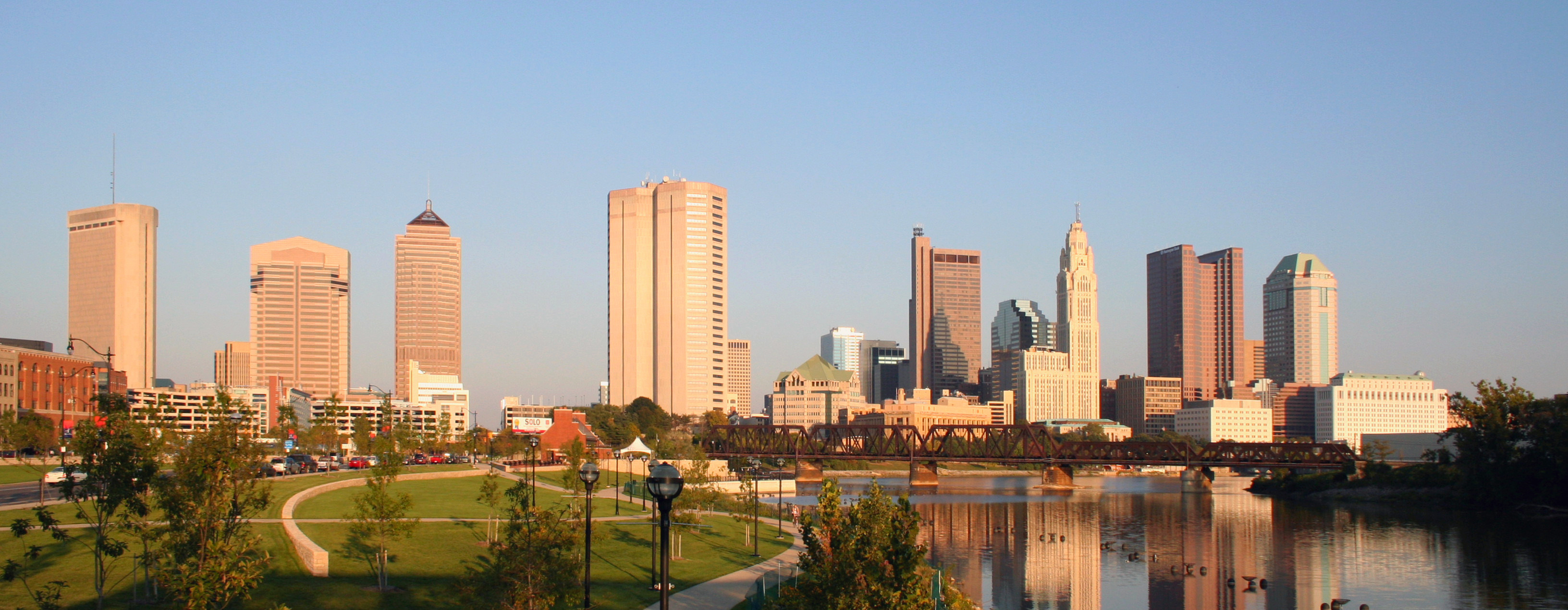
Columbus, Ohio

The Jewish community of Greater Columbus has made up a small but noteworthy part of the region since the arrival of Jews in 1840. The community has gone through periods of growth, especially in the last quarter of the 20th century. Today, the well-established community includes schools, temples, elder care facilities, kosher food services, ritual baths, social clubs, community religious learning centers and other organizations and has a population of approximately 25,500, as of the most recent 2013 study. It is the 43rd largest Jewish community in the United States and the third largest in Ohio, trailing Cleveland and Cincinnati.

== History ==
The Jewish community in Columbus began with the settlement of the Nusbaums and the Gundersheimers in 1840, six years after the city's 1834 establishment. Like Cleveland's first Jews, these immigrants came from Bavaria. Four synagogues were created in the 19th century; B’nai Jeshurun, Temple Israel, Agudas Achim, and Beth Jacob. After World War II, many Jews moved east into Bexley, Berwick, and Eastmoor, where many Jews and Jewish organizations remain today. Between 1975 and 2000, the Jewish population grew by 60%. A factor in this growth was the immigration of Soviet Jews after the fall of the Soviet Union in 1991. About 1,400 of these immigrants came to Columbus during this period. Today the population of 25,500 contributes to numerous local Jewish organizations. The modern Jewish community is based mostly in New Albany, Bexley, Gahanna, and certain neighborhoods in the city of Columbus.

== Jewish institutions ==
The community is home to many types of Jewish Institutions including schools, temples, and organizations. JewishColumbus is a leading organization and is a result of the merger of the Columbus Jewish Federation and the Columbus Jewish Foundation Synagogues in the region include:

- Ahavas Sholom - Orthodox, Bexley
- Agudas Achim - Traditional-Egalitarian, Bexley
- Beth Jacob Synagogue - Orthodox, Columbus
- Beth Tikvah - Reform, Worthington
- Temple Beth Shalom - Reform, New Albany
- Temple Israel - Reform, Columbus
- Tifereth Israel - Conservative, Columbus
- Torat Emet - Orthodox, Bexley
- The Lori Schottenstein Chabad Center - New Albany
- The Torah Center - Orthodox, Bexley
- Chabad of Downtown Columbus - Orthodox, Downtown Columbus
- Ohio State Hillel - Ohio State University
- Schottenstein Chabad House at OSU - Orthodox, Ohio State University
- Columbus Community Kollel - Orthodox, Bexley

There are two Jewish schools, Columbus Torah Academy, an Orthodox K-12 school, and Columbus Jewish Day School, a K-5 Jewish Day School. In addition, there is a Jewish Community Center, the Jewish Community Center of Greater Columbus, the Wexner Heritage Village retirement home, formerly the Jewish Home for the Aged, and several Jewish cemeteries.

== Notable people ==
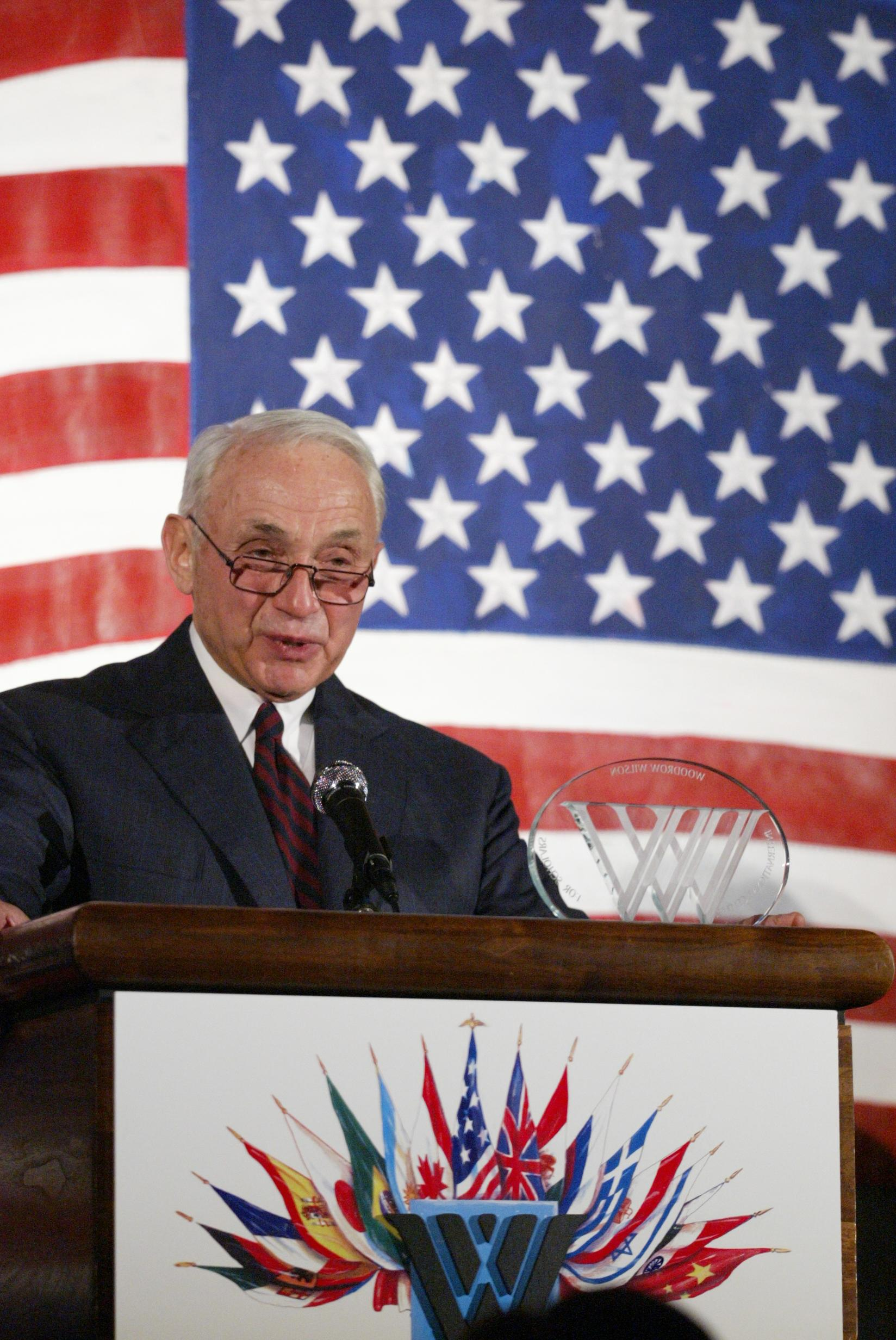
Les Wexner, businessman and philanthropist

- Amy Acton, Governor-Elect of Ohio, former director of the Ohio Department of Health
- Nate Ebner, NFL Player for the New England Patriots, US Olympian
- Michael Feinstein, Grammy nominated singer
- Ross Friedman, Harvard and Major League Soccer player
- Herbert Glimcher, founder of Glimcher Realty Trust.
- David Goodman, Former Member of the Ohio Senate and the Ohio House of Representatives
- Bob Greene, Journalist
- Paul Palnik, artist
- Josh Radnor, actor and director
- Robert W. Schiff, founder and chairman of Shoe Corporation of American (SCOA)
- Jay Schottenstein, businessman and philanthropist
- Jerome Schottenstein, noted businessman and philanthropist, patriarch of Schottenstein family
- Robert Shamansky, U.S. Representative from 1981 to 1983
- R.L. Stine, author
- Les Wexner, businessman and philanthropist, wealthiest person in Ohio
