= Joseph Saul Kornfeld =

American diplomat

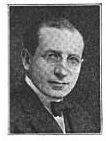

United States Minister to Persia
- In office April 11, 1922 – September 1, 1924
- President: Warren G. Harding

Personal details
- Born: February 12, 1876 Austria-Hungary
- Died: June 29, 1944 (aged 68)
- Education: Hebrew Union College
- Occupation: Reform rabbi, diplomat

Joseph Saul Kornfeld (February 12, 1876 – June 29, 1944) was an American reform rabbi and diplomat. He was US minister to Persia (Iran) from 1922 to 1924.

== Early life ==
Kornfeld was born in 1876 in the Austro-Hungarian empire to Jewish parents. He came to the US as a child, and in 1899 was ordained a rabbi at Hebrew Union College.

== Career ==
He served as a rabbi in Pine Bluff, Arkansas, Montreal and from 1907 at Temple Israel in Columbus. He was politically active in Columbus as a member of both the Charter Commission (1913) and Board of Education (1914–19). He was friendly with Ohio politicians and campaigned for Warren G. Harding in 1920.

November 9, 1921 he was appointed Envoy Extraordinary and Minister Plenipotentiary to Persia, the first rabbi to represent the United States at a foreign diplomatic post. During his time in Iran (April 11, 1922 – September 1, 1924) he made contact with Iranian Jewry and helped fight antisemitism in many cases. In one specific case in September 1922 he helped restore the water supply to the Jewish neighborhood of Oudlajan when Reza Khan had blocked it. His last significant duty was conducting the inquiry into the murder of Acting Consul Robert W. Imbrie, who was attacked in the Tehran bazaar on July 18, 1924. Kornfeld left Tehran on September 1 and returned to the United States.

He was rabbi of the Collingwood Avenue temple in Toledo, Ohio (1925-1934).

He was a lecturer. He was acting rabbi at Toronto’s Holy Blossom Temple when he died in 1944.
