= Mount Zion Temple =

Reform synagogue in St. Paul, Minnesota, United States

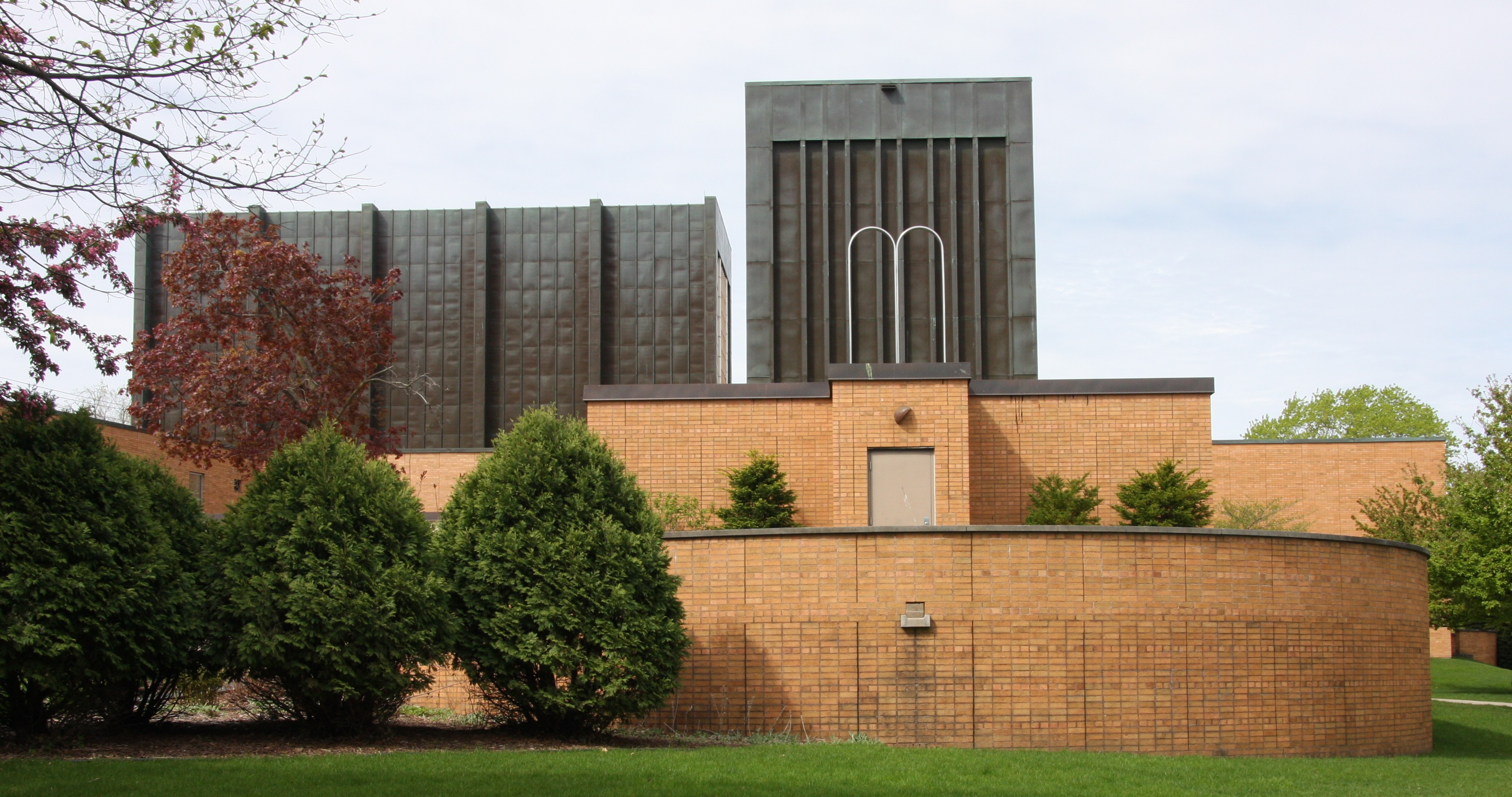
- Mount Zion Temple, in 2017

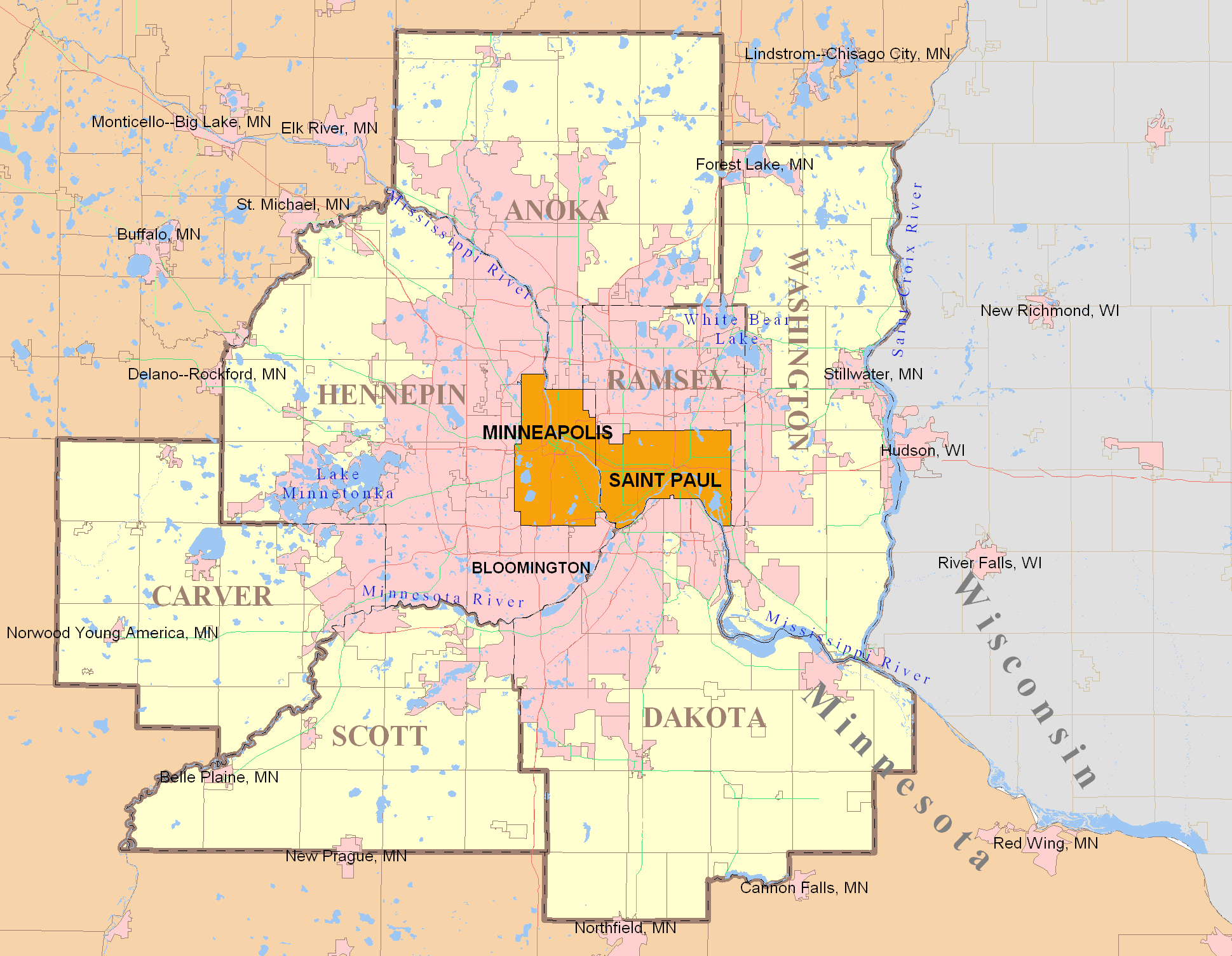
- Location in St. Paul, Minnesota

Religion
- Affiliation: Reform Judaism
- Ecclesiastical or organizational status: Synagogue
- Leadership: Rabbi Adam Spilker; Rabbi Esther Adler
- Status: Active

Location
- Location: 1300 Summit Avenue, St. Paul, Minnesota 55105
- Country: United States
- Interactive map of Mount Zion Temple
- Coordinates: 44°56′27″N 93°9′19″W

Architecture
- Architect: Erich Mendelsohn
- Type: Synagogue
- General contractor: Naugle-Leck
- Established: 1856 (as a congregation)
- Completed: 1871 (10th and Minnesota Sts.); 1900 (Holly and Avon Sts.); 1954 (Summit Ave.)

Website
- mzion.org

Mount Zion Temple is a Reform synagogue in St. Paul, Minnesota, United States. It is the oldest Jewish congregation in the state, founded in 1856 as Mount Zion Hebrew Association in Minnesota Territory. Its architecturally significant mid-century modern building is located on Summit Avenue.

== History ==
Founded in 1856 by eight German-Jewish families, Mount Zion Hebrew Association (as it was then called) was the first Jewish congregation in Minnesota. Through the 1860s the congregation met in rented rooms around St. Paul before their first building was completed in 1871, located at East Tenth Street and Minnesota Street in the Lowertown district. Early on the congregation was divided by a group called Ahabath Ahim, (Note: Hebrew: אהבת אחים, lit. 'Brotherly Love') which branched off then returned. Rabbi Leopold Wintner began as Mount Zion's first and Minnesota's first rabbi in 1871; the same year that the congregation built the first synagogue in the state; and founded the Hebrew Ladies Benevolent Society, members of which organized Neighborhood House to serve immigrants in the community. The rabbis and congregants of Mount Zion are still board members of Neighborhood House. In 1878, Mount Zion congregation joined the Reform Movement.

Emanuel Hess, who had been born in Meerholz, Germany in 1845, became rabbi in 1888. He had previously served as rabbi of Temple Israel of Columbus, Ohio in 1876–1877, and then Congregation B'nai Zion in Shreveport, Louisiana, where he served until 1888. Hess was rabbi of Mount Zion until his death in 1906.

In the 1940s the congregation participated in recreations such as "The Jewish Home Beautiful" which shared traditions of daily life. In 1948, began the leadership of Rabbi Gunther Plaut, who published books on the congregation's history and on the Jewish history of Minnesota.

In the 1950s, the congregation chose the prominent avant-garde architect Erich Mendelsohn to design a building for them on a hill on Summit Avenue. After projects in Europe, the Soviet Union, Israel, and America, this was his final building, breaking ground in 1952 and completed after his death in 1953. Completed in late 1954, the farewell service in the old temple building at Avon St & Holly Ave took place on Friday, December 17, 1954, with dedication of the new building on Sunday, December 19, 1954, installing the Torah scrolls and lighting an "eternal light" on the altar of the main sanctuary—intended to burn continuously; Rabbi Gunther Plaut stated it was the first such continuously burning light in the United States.

In 2002, the Mount Zion Temple was part of a radio program that detailed their restoration of Torah scrolls. In 2007, 690 families were members of the congregation. As of 2025 the rabbis were Adam Stock Spilker, Esther Adler, and Heather Renetzky. The cantors were Rachel Stock Spilker and Jen Strauss-Klein.

== Gallery ==
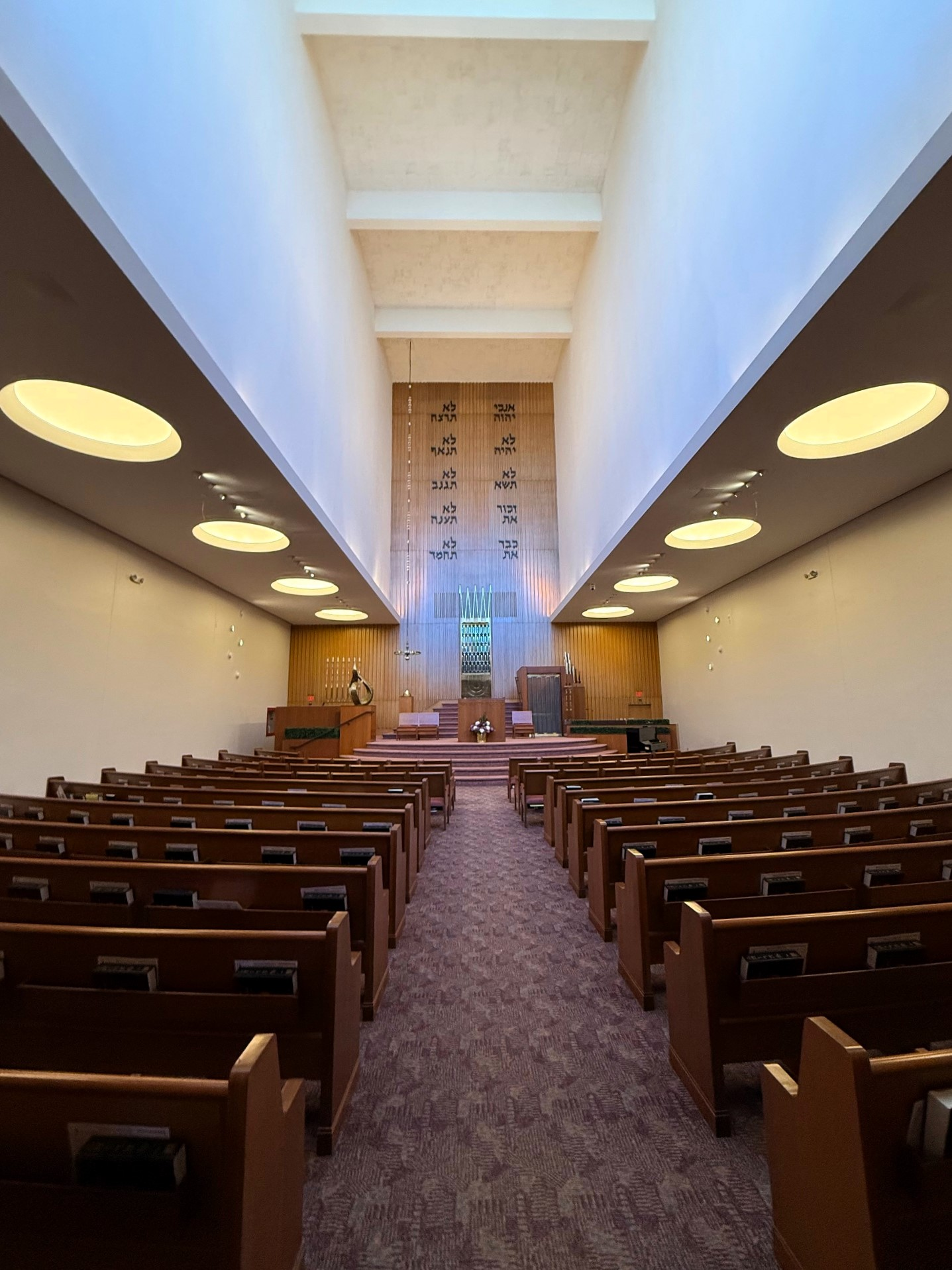
Main sanctuary

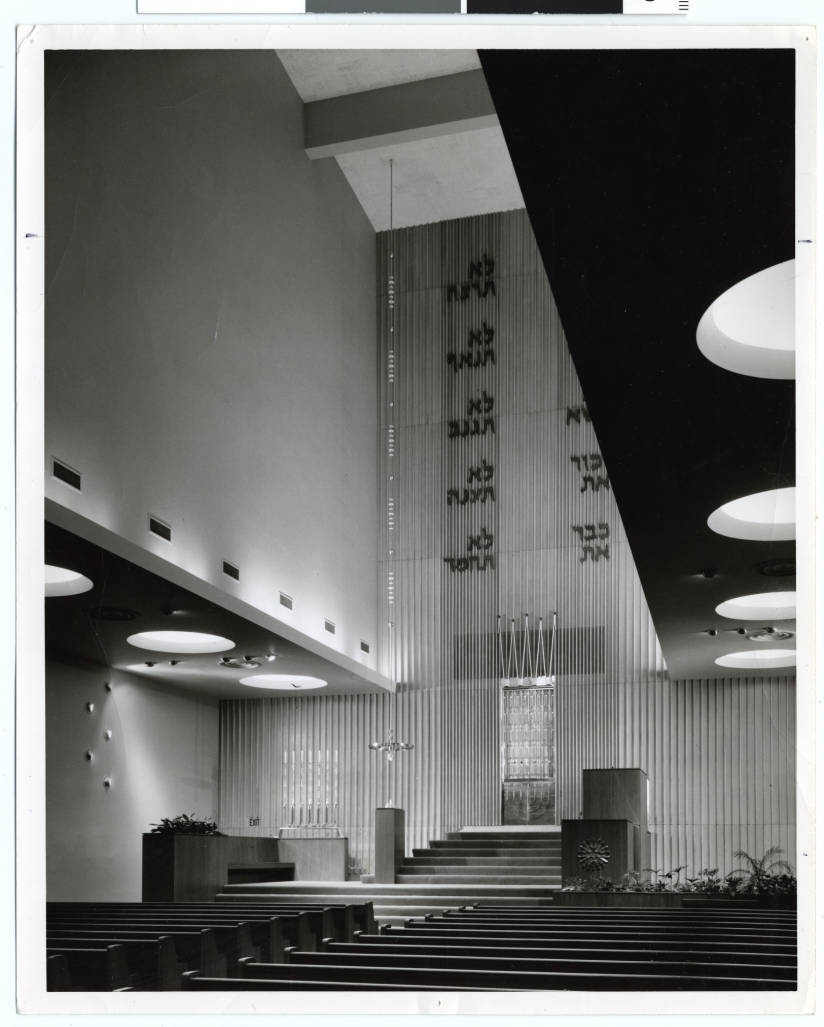
Sanctuary in 1954, before modifications to bimah

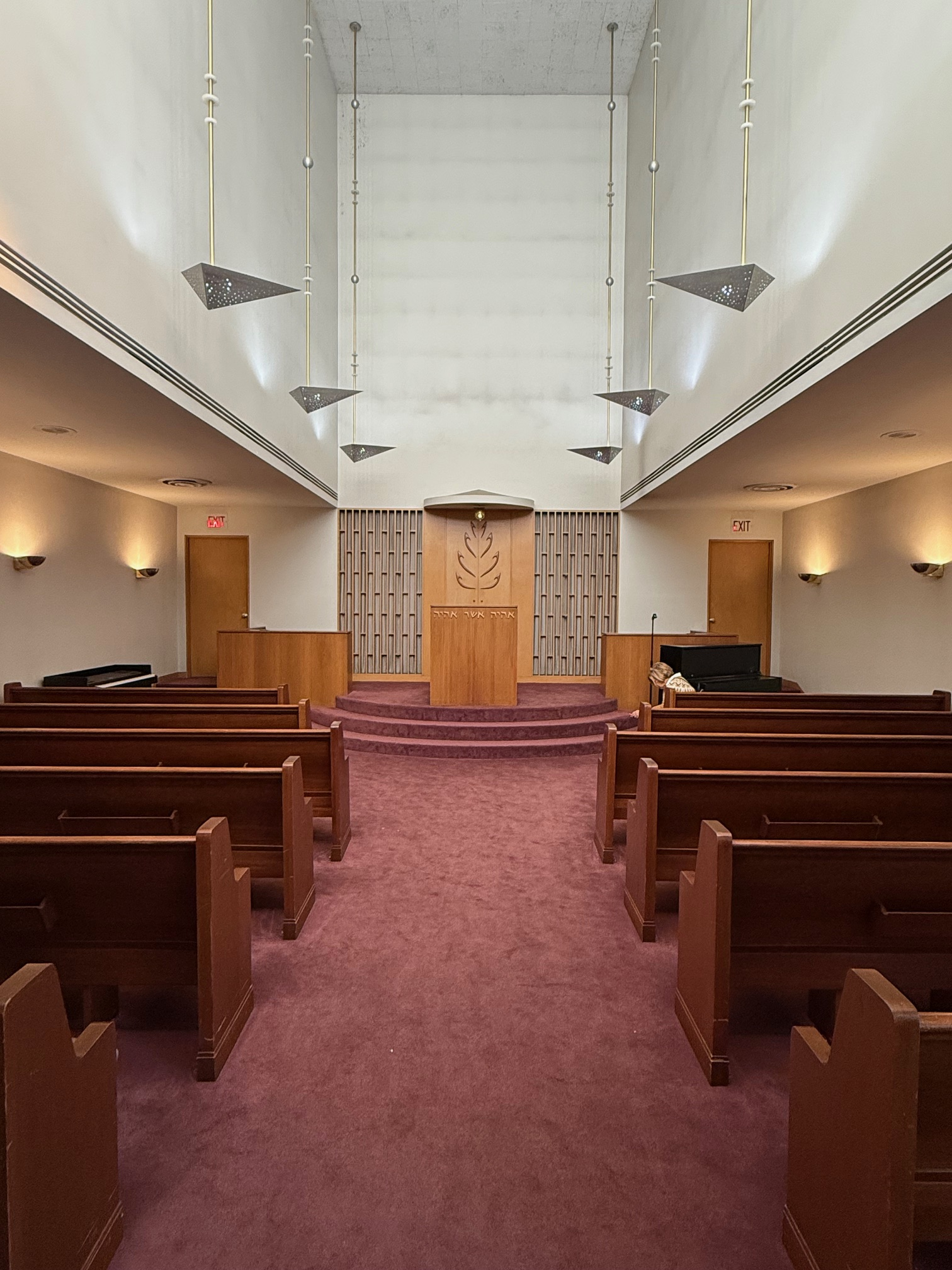
Harris Chapel

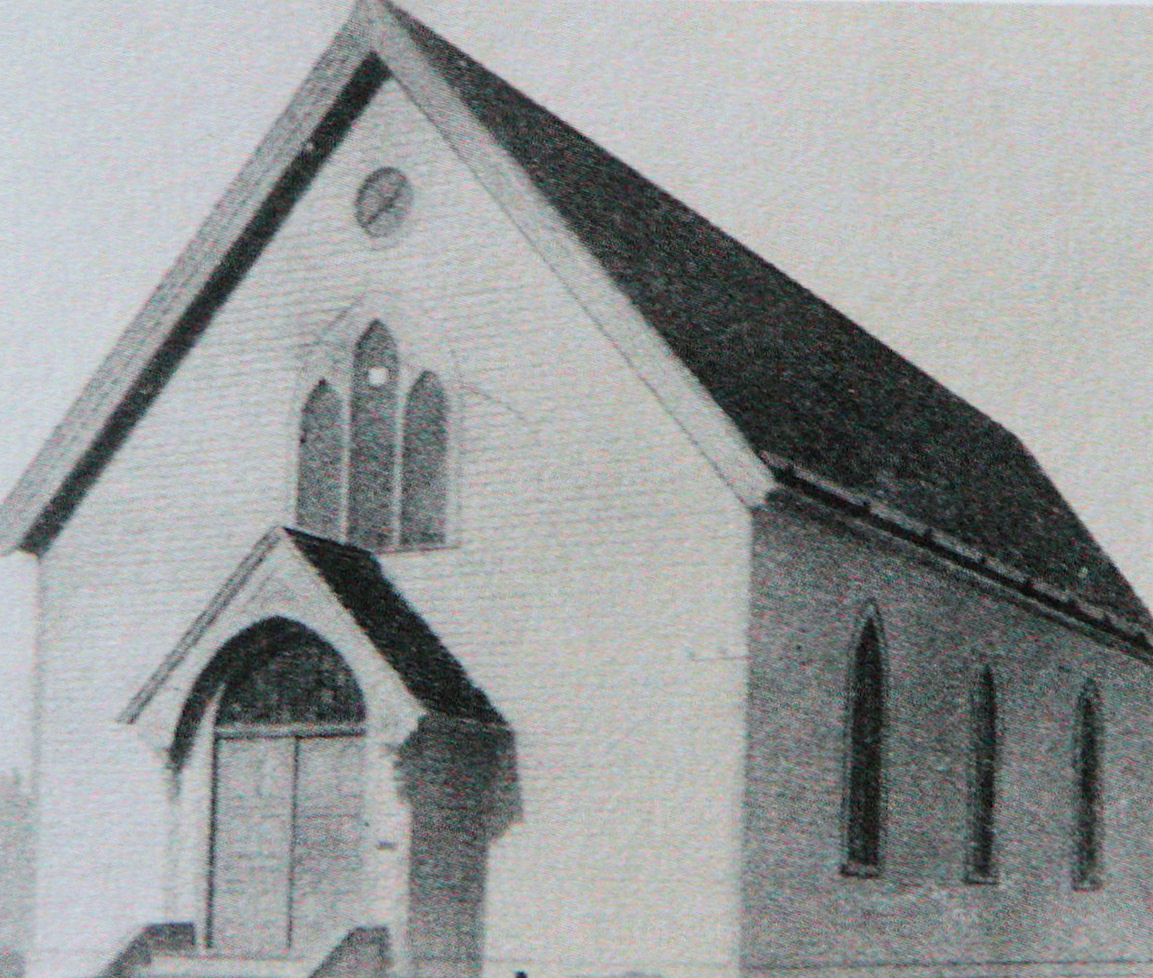
The first Mount Zion Temple, in 1875

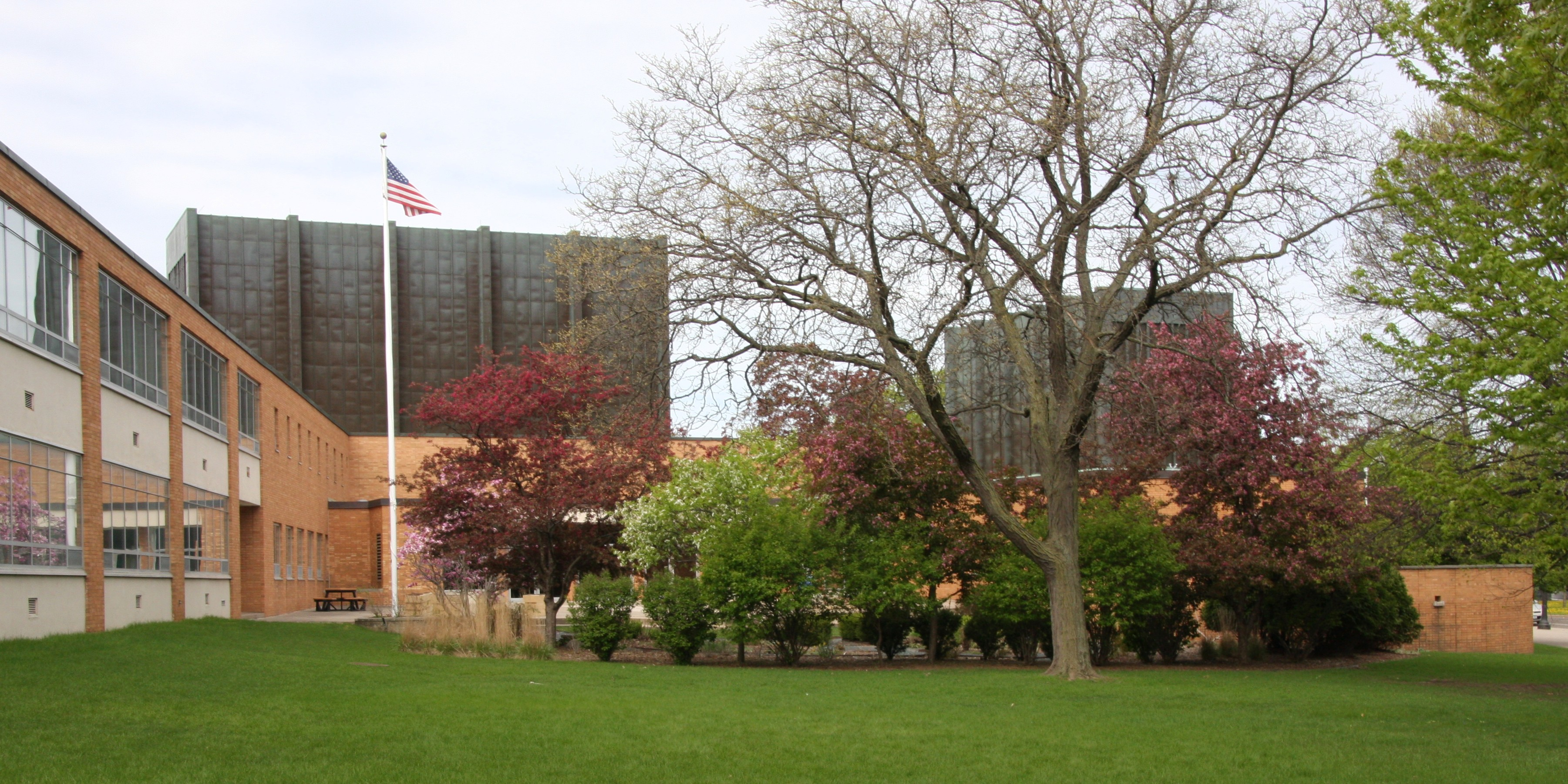
The building and grounds, in 2017

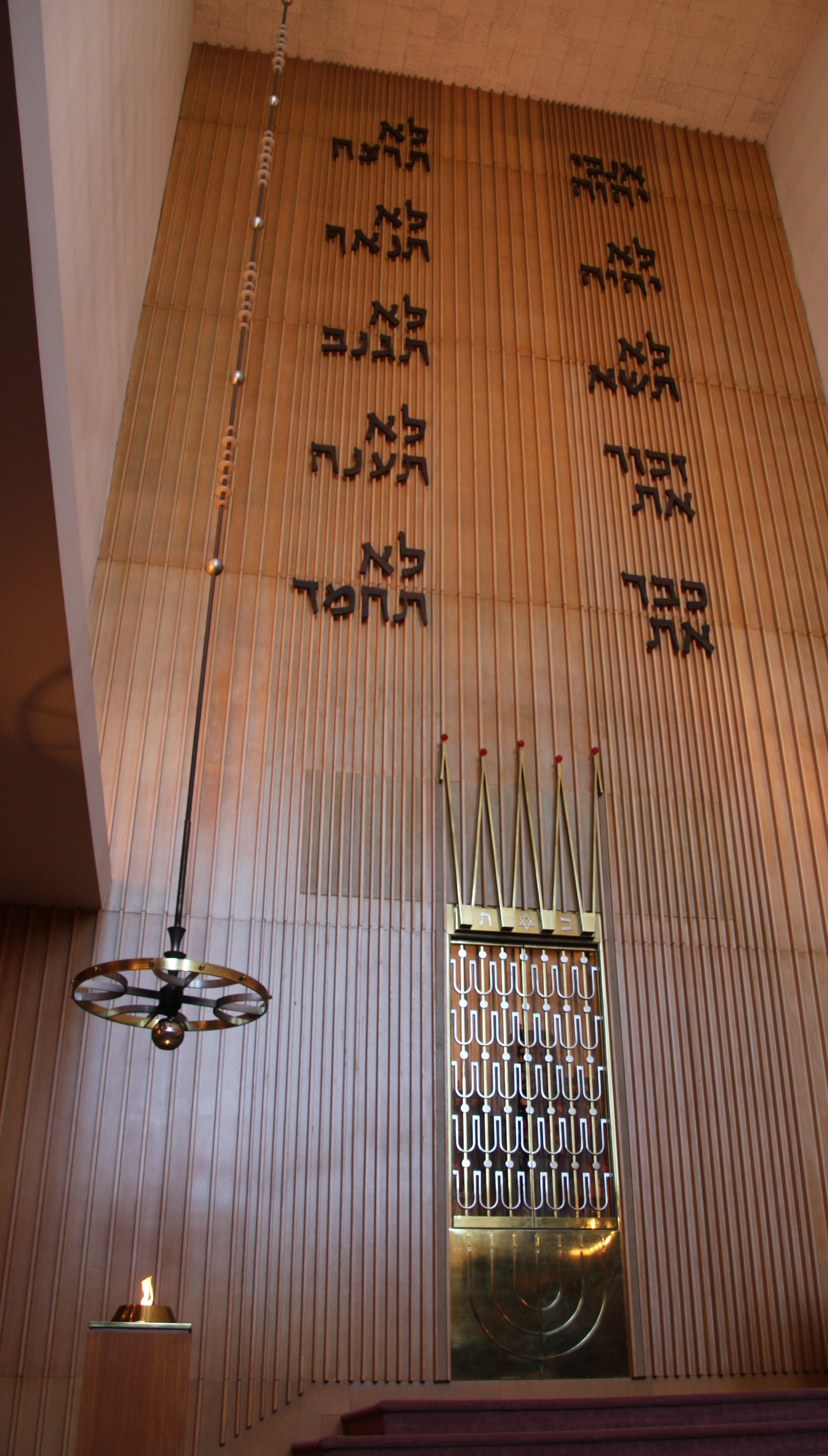
The Torah ark

== See also ==
- List of synagogues in Minnesota
