= Columbus Torah Academy =

Jewish school in Columbus, Ohio, US

- Official School Logo

Location
- 181 Noe Bixby Rd. Columbus, Ohio; United States
- Coordinates: 39°58′27″N 82°51′19″W

Information
- Type: Private, K-12, religious, co-educational
- Religious affiliation: Modern Orthodox/Zionist
- Founded: 1958
- Principal: Debbie Grashin
- Principal: Mirana Kogon
- Headmaster: Rabbi Avrohom Drandoff
- Teaching staff: approx. 50
- Grades: K- 12
- Enrollment: approx. 213
- Student to teacher ratio: 6:1
- Schedule type: Double Curriculum, 9-period
- Schedule: 7:30 am - 4:00 pm
- Hours in school day: 7.5 - 8.5
- Affiliations: ISACS
- Website: torahacademy.org

Columbus Torah Academy (CTA) is a Modern Orthodox Jewish K-12 school in Columbus, Ohio.

== About ==
Columbus Torah Academy provides a comprehensive college preparatory education and a Judaic studies education for Jewish students in the greater Columbus area.

Established in 1958, CTA started with a class of 11 students in the basement of the Agudas Achim Synagogue. With expansion each year, the school grew to include grades K-8, with the first graduating class of eight students in 1966. From 1972-75, Temple Israel was the temporary home to the school.

In 1975, CTA moved to its permanent home at 181 Noe Bixby Road. Due to the large population of children who arrived from the former Soviet Union, the Learning Center was created in 1988 in order to provide English as a second language to these students. As enrollment continued to increase, the school expanded into trailers and then in 1991, a new wing of 10 classrooms was added.

With growing support for day school secondary education, the families and leadership of CTA sought to expand the school to include grades 9-12. In 1991, the first ninth grade class enrolled with five students. Each year a grade and a trailer were added with the first high school graduation of five students in 1995. To accommodate this growth, an additional two-story building was constructed in 1995 containing ten Upper School classrooms, state of the art chemistry lab, biology lab, elementary library, Upper School library, computer lab, gymnasium with seating for 300 people, and administrative offices.

In 1997, a chapel was built by Saul Schottenstein and dedicated in memory of his parents, Ephraim and Anna Schottenstein. The chapel has seating for 200 people and is used daily for morning prayers. Frequently, the chapel facilitates parent meetings, school assemblies, and other gatherings.

== Classes ==
Columbus Torah Academy runs a double curriculum. Students spend half of the day in Judaic studies and half of the day in secular studies. There are different levels of classes, and, based on grade level and previous experiences, students are sorted into one of these classes.

== Community service ==
High school students are required to volunteer at least 15 hours of community service.

== Campus layout ==
The CTA campus is situated on a 42-acre (170,000 m^{2}) tract. Prayer services are held twice daily in the school's synagogue-sanctuary, also used as an auditorium. The facility includes 32 classrooms, three science labs, two gymnasiums, two computer labs, one writing lab, arts loft and two libraries. Additionally, the campus contains outdoor soccer, and ball fields, tennis courts, and playground equipment.

== Notable alumni ==
- Ross Friedman (born 1992), Major League Soccer player
- Josh Radnor (born 1974), actor
