= Ross Friedman (soccer) =

American soccer player (born 1992)

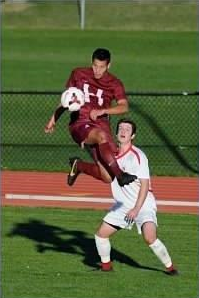

Personal information
- Full name: Ross Benjamin Friedman
- Date of birth: January 8, 1992 (age 34)
- Place of birth: Columbus, Ohio, United States
- Height: 1.75 m (5 ft 9 in)
- Position: Defender

Youth career
- 2008–2010: Columbus Crew
- 2010–2013: Harvard Crimson

Senior career*
Years	Team	Apps	(Gls)
2014	Columbus Crew	0	(0)
2014	→ Dayton Dutch Lions (loan)	16	(0)

International career
2013	Team USA – Maccabiah Games		
- * Club domestic league appearances and goals as of September 8, 2014

Ross Friedman
Medal record

Representing United States

Football

Maccabiah Games
Gold medal – first place	2013 Maccabiah	Football

Ross Benjamin Friedman (born January 8, 1992) is an American former professional soccer player who played for the Columbus Crew and the Dayton Dutch Lions as a defender. In high school he was first team All-MSL, first team all-district, first team all-Ohio, and NSCAA all region. At Harvard University, he attained two all-time records at Harvard his senior year with 12 season assists and 17 career assists, and was named 2nd team All-Ivy League. Professionally, he played for the Columbus Crew and the Dayton Dutch Lions. He and Team USA won the gold medal at the 2013 Maccabiah Games in Israel.

== Early life ==
Friedman is Jewish, and was born in Columbus, Ohio, to Tod and Cheri Friedman, and his hometown was Bexley, Ohio. He was a member of the Jewish Community Center of Greater Columbus. He began his soccer career at the JCC and on the Columbus Torah Academy recreational FIFA team. He attends both Temple Israel and Beth Jacob Congregation in Columbus.

== High school ==
Friedman attended Bexley High School in Bexley, Ohio where he was a four-year letter winner and captained the Boys' Soccer Team his junior and senior years. During his tenure at Bexley, he led the team to two state semi-final appearances, earning first team All-MSL as a junior, first team all-district, first team all-state and NSCAA all region as a senior. Friedman also played for the Crew Soccer Academy that finished 3rd at the Development Academy finals.

== College ==
Friedman committed to Harvard University (Government, Economics '14) in 2010. He played in 14 games as a freshman, starting four and scoring the game-winning goal against the University of Massachusetts. As a sophomore, he started all 17 games and led the team in points with six assists and six points, receiving an All-Ivy League Honorable Mention. Friedman attained two all-time records at Harvard his senior year by having 12 season assists and 17 career assists, also ranking 6th in the NCAA in assists and 5th in assists per game. He was named 2nd team All-Ivy League as well as named to the Academic All-Ivy League. He helped the Columbus Crew Junior win the 2010 and the 2011 Super-20 championship and was named the all-tournament teams in 2010 and 2012. He was also a member of the fraternity AEPi at Harvard.

== Maccabiah Games ==
In 2013 Friedman helped Team USA capture the gold medal at the 2013 Maccabiah Games in Israel, leading the tournament in assists. He scored on his penalty kick in the overtime shootout in the championship against Argentina. He said playing in the 2013 Maccabiah Games "was the best and coolest experience in my whole soccer career."

== Professional career ==
Friedman signed as a Homegrown Player with Columbus Crew on January 8, 2014. He was loaned out to their USL Pro affiliate Dayton Dutch Lions in March 2014. On November 18, 2014, the Crew declined his option.

Friedman then played a short while for an Israeli club in southern Tel Aviv. In 2015, a significant injury forced him to retire.

== After soccer ==
Friedman then began a career in real estate, working first for Rockbridge, a private investment firm specializing in hospitality investments, from 2015 to 2018. In 2018 he and some partners started Main + High Investments, a private equity and real estate firm in Columbus.
