= Temple Israel (Columbus, Ohio) =

Reform Jewish synagogue in Ohio, US

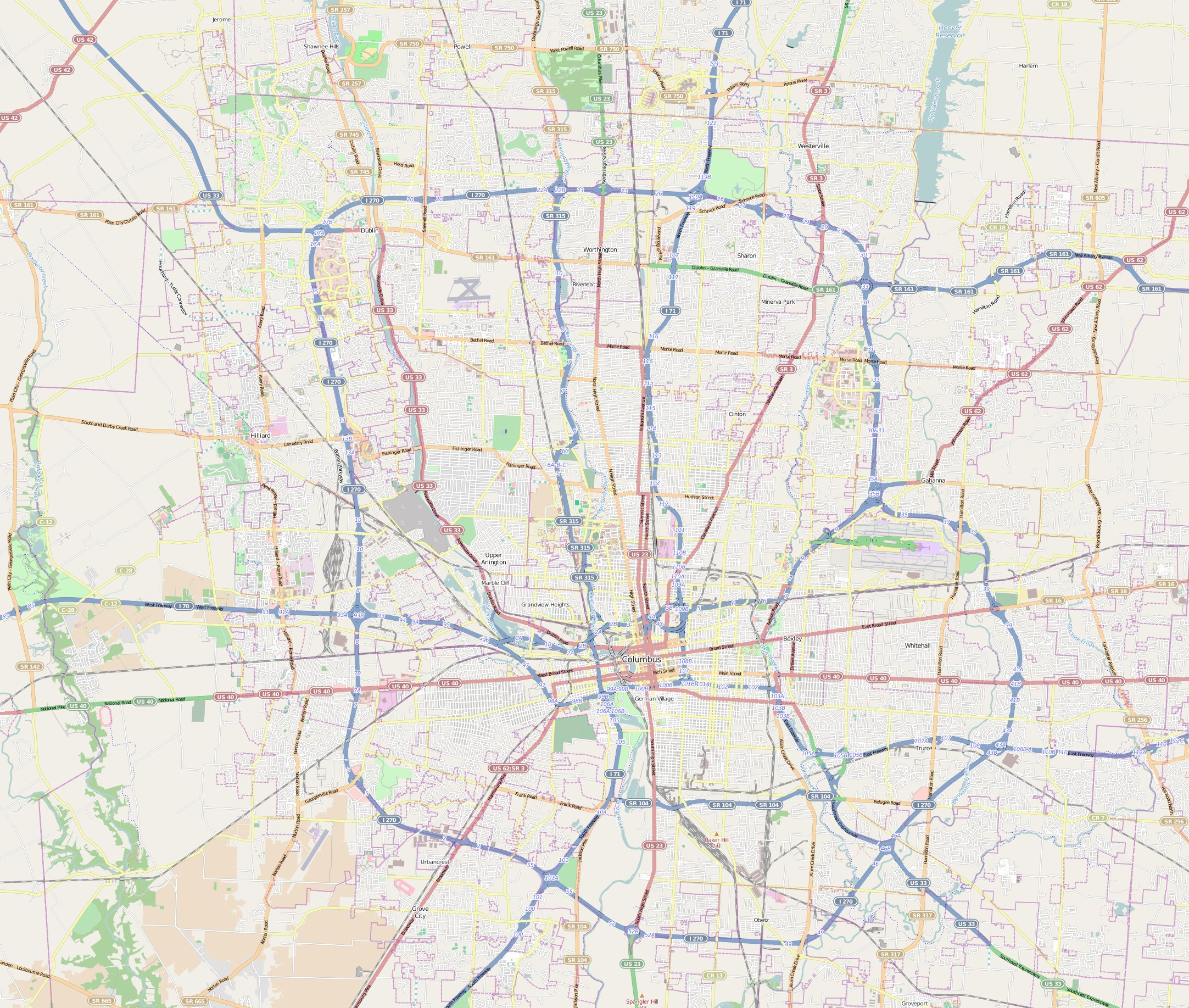
- Location in Columbus, Ohio

Religion
- Affiliation: Reform Judaism
- Ecclesiastical or organizational status: Synagogue
- Leadership: Rabbi Sharon Mars
- Status: Active

Location
- Location: 3100 East Broad Street, Columbus, Ohio
- Country: United States
- Interactive map of Temple Israel
- Coordinates: 39°58′41″N 82°51′19″W

Architecture
- Architect: Percival Goodman
- Type: Synagogue architecture
- Style: Modernist
- Established: 1846 (as a congregation)
- Completed: 1870 (Friend and 3rd Streets); 1904 (Olde Towne East); 1959 (East Broad Street)

Website
- templeisrael.org

Temple Israel is a Reform Jewish congregation and synagogue, located at 3100 East Broad Street, in Columbus, Ohio, in the United States. Founded as the Orthodox Bene Jeshurun congregation in 1846, the congregation is the oldest Jewish congregation in Columbus, and a founding member of the Union for Reform Judaism. Its first religious leader was Simon Lazarus, a clothing merchant who founded what would become Lazarus department stores.

Differences between traditionalists and reformers led to a split in 1868, and re-merger in 1870, as the Reform B'nai Israel (later Temple Israel). To accommodate growth, the congregation constructed buildings in 1870 and 1903–1904.

Jerome Folkman started his tenure as the synagogue's longest-serving rabbi in 1947, and the congregation moved to its current location in 1959, a building designed by architect Percival Goodman. The building was significantly renovated in the late 1990s. Sharon Mars, appointed in 2017, is the first woman senior rabbi in the congregation's history.

== Formation, move to Reform ==
Temple Israel was formed as early as 1846 by eleven families of Jews of German background as Bene Jeshurun, the first and oldest Jewish congregation in Columbus. Originally Orthodox, its first religious leader was Simon Lazarus, a clothing merchant who founded what would become Lazarus department stores. Lazarus, who had received rabbinical training in Berlin, served as a rabbi, without pay, and services were initially held in an upstairs room in his store.

By 1868, many members wished to reform the services, and a majority (19 families, including all the remaining original founders) left Bene Jeshurun to form "B'nai Israel". By 1870 Bene Jeshurun had dissolved; its members joined B'nai Israel, which also inherited Bene Jeshurun's assets. That year the congregation hired its first full-time rabbi, Judah Wechsler, and erected its first building, at the corner of Friend and Third Streets. The lot had cost $5,000 (today $127,000), with funds coming primarily from 21 of the 35 member families. The laying of the cornerstone was accompanied by "Masonic ceremonies", and the keynote speaker was rabbi Isaac Mayer Wise.

In the new building the congregation significantly reformed its religious practices. It adopted the Minhag America prayer-book, with prayers in English instead of Hebrew, added choir music (including non-Jewish choir members) to the service, adopted mixed seating (men and women together), insisted that sermons be given in English and German, The congregation also did away with the second day of the three Pilgrimage Festivals and the New Year, and allowed men to pray without wearing head coverings. Nevertheless, for a time, they kept some traditional practices and views; they "continued to employ a ritual slaughterer", and, in 1872, the synagogue board demanded that officials "put a stop to" Christian songs in public schools. The following year the congregation was one of the founding members of the Union for Reform Judaism.

Wechsler left in 1873, and was succeeded as rabbi that year by Samuel Weil. Weil served for three years. He was followed by Emanuel Hess, who had been born in Meerholz, Germany in 1845. At the time, the congregation was experiencing financial difficulties. Hess was forced to leave after only one year, when he failed to ask for permission to officiate at the marriage of a non-member. Hess moved to Congregation B'nai Zion in Shreveport, Louisiana, where he served until 1888, and then to Mount Zion Temple in St. Paul, Minnesota until his death in 1906.

== Early 20th century, Folkman era ==
By the turn of the 20th century, under the leadership of Rabbi E.B.M. Brown, B'nai Israel held services twice a week, Friday nights at 8:00pm and Saturday mornings at 10:00am. The congregation had 41 member families, and annual revenues of $2,650 (today $103,000). The religious school held classes once a week, and had four teachers and 66 students.

The congregation had grown to over 100 member families by 1903, and larger premises were required. In 1902 they had purchased a lot on Bryden Road at 18th Street—in Columbus's Olde Towne East neighborhood—for $6,300 (today $234,000). Construction was started in 1903, and completed in 1904, at a cost of $40,587 (today $1,450,000). By this time the synagogue was also known as "Temple Israel". By 1907, the rabbi was Joseph Saul Kornfeld. Membership had dropped to 80, and the school had 75 students.

In 1918, under Kornfeld's leadership, the congregational school held classes one day a week, and had six teachers and ten students. Kornfeld served as rabbi until 1921, when he was appointed United States Minister to Persia. He filled that role until 1924, when he became rabbi of the Collingwood Avenue Temple in Toledo, Ohio, where he served until 1934.

Jerome D. Folkman became Temple Israel's rabbi in 1947. Born in 1907, he was ordained at Hebrew Union College (HUC) in 1928. He first served at Temple Beth Israel in Jackson, Michigan and Temple Emanuel in Grand Rapids, Michigan before coming to Temple Israel. Folkman was a family therapist, and he focused on working with congregational families. Though he made no changes to ritual, he did re-introduce some traditional elements to the service: he wore a tallit in the pulpit, and put silver ornaments on the Torah scrolls. Both of these actions were criticized. Noted for his pastoral and humanitarian work, he was a recipient of a number of awards, including, in 1968, a Governor's Award. Rabbi Folkman was the father of cancer researcher Dr. Judah Folkman. Folkman would become Temple Israel's longest-serving rabbi, retiring in 1973.

By 1942 membership was over 400 families, and by 1950 that had increased to over 750 families. Jack and Eleanor Resler donated the land for a larger facility. Reflecting Folkman's view that "Jews move eastward in American cities", the new site was at 5419 East Broad Street, on the far east side of the city. Prolific synagogue architect Percival Goodman was engaged, and produced the drawings for a new Modernist building in 1956. In July, 1958 construction was begun on the structure, which was dedicated in December, 1959.

== 1970s to present ==
Folkman was succeeded in 1973 by Edward D. Kiner. Kiner focussed on involving parents in their children's religious education, and on family education in general. During his tenure, a number of families who took issue with Kiner's leadership left Temple Israel, and formed Beth Shalom Congregation. Kiner served until 1977.

Harvey Goldman succeeded Kiner as rabbi in 1978. During his tenure, the congregation hired its first cantor in 1980. Goldman served until 1985.

Bradley Bleefeld became senior rabbi in 1987. Bleefeld, a graduate of the University of Cincinnati, had been ordained at HUC in 1975, and had served as Temple Israel's assistant rabbi from 1975 to 1977. He subsequently filled rabbinic roles at Baltimore Hebrew Congregation, the Chautauqua Institution, and Temple Anshe Hesed in Erie, Pennsylvania before returning to Temple Israel. Bleefeld focused on education, convincing pupils at the religious school to continue their education until their Confirmation ceremony. He also supported the homeless, convincing congregants to use synagogue facilities to house them, and participate in food distribution programs. He also encouraged the members to become actively involved in Jewish organizations, at the local, regional, and national levels. He left Temple Israel in 1995, moving to Reform Congregation Keneseth Israel of Elkins Park, Pennsylvania.

Bleefeld was succeeded in 1995 by Arthur Nemitoff; that year, Temple Israel had over 850 member families. Nemitoff had been ordained at HUC in 1981, and had served in pulpits in Houston, Philadelphia, and Boston before coming to Temple Israel. By September 2000, the congregation completed a major renovation of its over 59,000 square foot (5,500 m^{2}) building. The bimah, sanctuary lamp, stained glass windows and sconces from the Bryden Road synagogue were incorporated into the redesigned sanctuary and chapel. Nemitoff would serve through 2003, before becoming Senior Rabbi at Kansas City's Temple B'nai Jehudah, where he had been a congregant as a teen.

Misha E. Zinkow joined as senior rabbi in July 2004. A graduate of Occidental College, he had been ordained at HUC in 1985, and had previously served at Congregation Emanu-El in San Francisco, California, Mount Zion Temple in St. Paul, Minnesota and as a Hillel rabbi at Ohio State University. Emily Rosenzweig joined Temple Israel as Rabbi after being ordained at HUC in 2006. As of 2012, Temple Israel had over 650 member families. Zinkow was the senior rabbi, and Bat-Ami Moses was the cantor.

Rabbi Sharon Mars joined Temple Israel as the Associate Rabbi and Director of Community Engagement in April 2013 and was appointed as senior rabbi in July 2017, the first female appointed to this position.

== Notable members ==
- Ross Friedman (born 1992), professional soccer player

== See also ==
- List of the oldest synagogues in the United States
- History of the Jews in Ohio
