= Bexley High School =

Public school in Bexley, Ohio, US

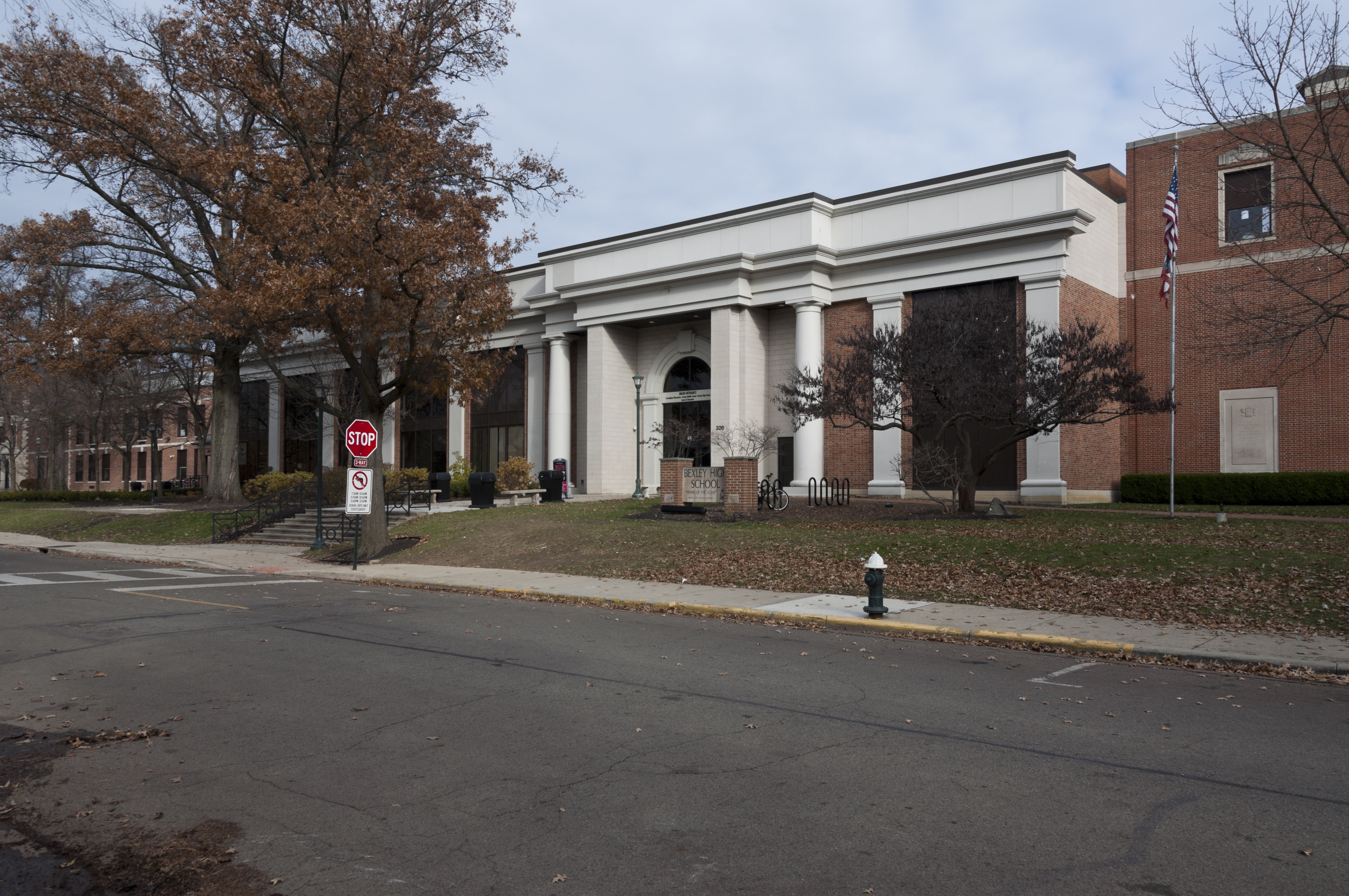
- Bexley High School

Location
- 326 South Cassingham Road; Bexley, Ohio, (Franklin County) 43209; United States; 39°57′49″N 82°55′48″W

Information
- Type: Public, coeducational high school
- Established: 1921
- School district: Bexley City Schools
- Superintendent: Jason Fine
- CEEB code: 361505
- Principal: Jason Caudill
- Teaching staff: 43.93 (FTE)
- Grades: 9-12
- Enrollment: 768 (2023-2024)
- Student to teacher ratio: 17.48
- Colors: Royal blue and white
- Athletics conference: Central Buckeye League
- Mascot: Lion
- Team name: Lions
- Rival: Columbus Academy
- Accreditation: North Central Association of Colleges and Schools
- Newspaper: The Torch
- Yearbook: Bexleo
- Feeder schools: Bexley Middle School
- Website: https://bhs.bexley.us/

Bexley High School (BHS) is a public high school located in Bexley, Ohio, a suburb of Columbus.

== Athletics ==
Bexley’s athletic program includes teams in the following sports: lacrosse, football, basketball, baseball, cheerleading, cross country, field hockey, lacrosse, soccer, softball, swimming, tennis, track, volleyball, and wrestling. Bexley purchased artificial grass for athletes to perform on in the winter of 2003. In 2024 the school purchased 6 million dollars' worth of land for a new athletic complex. Teams have won the Ohio High School Athletic Association State Championships in:

- Boys Golf - 2015
- Boys Basketball - 1983
- Boys Soccer - 2003, 2005
- Girls Volleyball - 1977

Other non-sanctioned titles:

- Girls Tennis (OTCA)- 1975, 1976, 1977, 1978,2023,2024
- Boys Tennis (OTCA)- 1975, 2017
- Boys Diving - 2023

=== Football program ===
In 2016, the program earned its first home playoff game and first playoff win, and went 11–1. The program also earned a playoff spot in the 2008, 2013, 2014, and 2015 seasons.

=== Soccer program ===
The Men's and women's soccer teams have combined for 12 state final fours since 1999. The men's team has won two state championships (in 2003 and 2005) and has appeared in multiple Final Four and Regional Finals. They have also had a flurry of All-District, All-State, and two All-American selections. The men's program won their league championship for 15 straight seasons until the streak was ended in 2009. The women have been one of the most consistent teams of their sport in the state; they were state finalists in 1999 through 2003, 2005, and 2006; state runners-up in 1999; and state champions in 2009. The women have also had multiple all-district, all-state, and all-American recipients.

Ross Friedman was a four-year letter winner and captained the team his junior and senior years. During his tenure at Bexley, he led the team to two state semi-final appearances, earning first team All-MSL as a junior, first team all-district, first team all-state and NSCAA all region as a senior.

=== Wrestling program ===
The wrestling program has had individual successes throughout the school's history. There have been numerous state qualifiers, 10 state placers and one state champion. As a team there has not been a great deal of success until recently when they earned a Mid-State League Title in 2017 for first time since 1998. A team dual record of 17-2 was also set in 2017 breaking the previous season record of 16–3. The program currently has successful youth and junior high teams as well.

=== Softball program ===
The 2018 season was one of the most successful in program history with the team going 14-9 and winning two games in the state tournament (defeating Licking Valley and London). The Lions advanced to the district semi-finals and fell to Hebron Lakewood.

== Clubs ==
- Art Club
- Bexleo (Yearbook)
- Bexley Asian American and Pacific Islander Club
- Ski Club
- Environmental Club
- Book Club
- Key Club
- The Lamplight
- In The Know
- Latin Club - functions as a local chapter of both the Ohio Junior Classical League (OJCL) and the National Junior Classical League (NJCL).
- Student Council
- Band
- Choirs: Men's Glee, Women's Glee, Men's Chorus, Women's Chorale, and Vocal Ensemble
- Orchestra: Concert Orchestra, Bexley Sinfonia
- Chess Club
- Ultimate
- Vex Robotics Club

== Band program ==
=== Marching Band ===
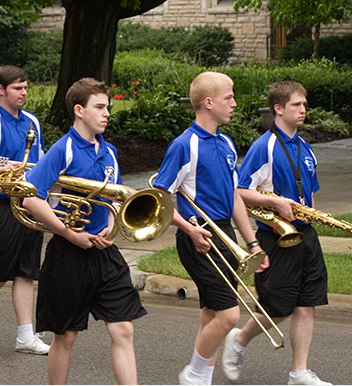
BHS Marching Band at July 4th Parade, 2008

Bexley High School Marching Pride is a show-style marching band that excels in entertaining a crowd, performs pop, rock, funk, and blues music at sports events, community parades, as well as public concerts throughout the year. The Marching Pride has performed at the Outback Bowl game, Walt Disney Magic Kingdom, Walt Disney Epcot, Chicago, IL, University of Cincinnati, and Honolulu, Hawaii at Pearl Harbor.

=== Concert Band ===
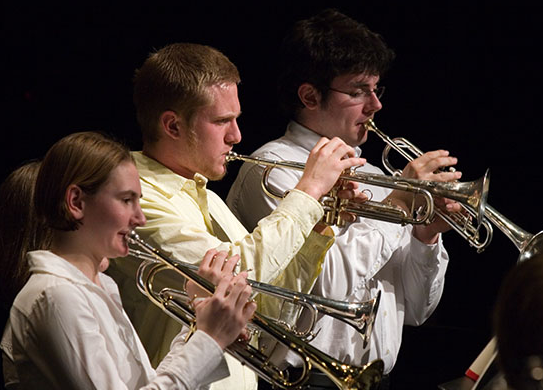
BHS Concert Band at their December 2007 concert

Concert Band begins at the conclusion of the football season. The students are split into two bands for the Concert Band Season - Symphonic Band and Prism. Concerts are graded performances, including OMEA Contests, and opportunities for OMEA Solo and Ensemble. The Concert Band is a Co-Curricular, Board of Education-supported class where students receive a grade and credit for participation.

=== Pep Band ===
Pep Band, considered an extension of the Marching Band, is an opportunity to perform for men's and women's home varsity basketball games. It is a volunteer band composed of students from the school band program.

=== Jazz Band ===
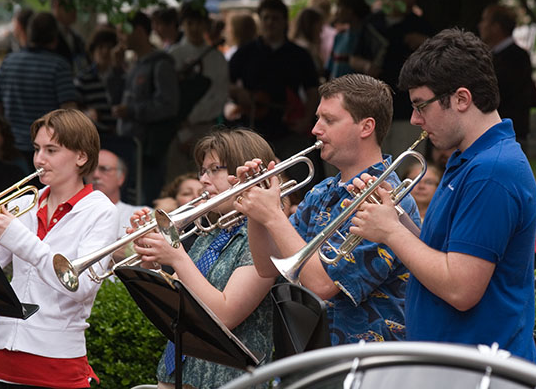
BHS Jazz Band with their director Andrew Johnson on trumpet

Jazz Band is a Co-Curricular, Board of Education-supported class where students receive a grade and credit for participation. It performs several concerts throughout the year. To join, auditions are necessary, and most instruments are accepted. The Jazz Band has traveled to conferences (Beaver Creek Jazz Festival and Capital University Jazz and World Music Festival).

== Orchestra ==
The Bexley High School Orchestra is in two classes: Camerata Orchestra, which is the entry-level orchestra, and Sinfonia Orchestra, which is the higher level performance group in the program.

=== Camerata Orchestra ===
The Camerata Orchestra is the entry-level orchestra, having the same director as the Sinfonia Orchestra, but playing different pieces aimed at a high school level.

=== Bexley Sinfonia ===
The Sinfonia Orchestra is the higher level orchestra, which tends to play arrangements of Baroque and Classical pieces. Former students who have performed a solo with Sinfonia include Oliver Martin, performing Hoffmeister's Viola Concerto in D Major.

== Performance ==
- 2024: U.S. News & World Report named BHS the top public high school in Central Ohio, second best in Ohio, and 147th nationally.
- 2023: U.S. News & World Report named BHS the top public high school in Central Ohio, best in Ohio, and 121st nationally.
- 2020: U.S. News & World Report named BHS the top public high school in Central Ohio, third best in Ohio, and 136th nationally.
- 2019: The Ohio Department of Education Report Card showed that, among high schools, BHS had the highest Performance Index Score in Franklin County.
- 2019: U.S. News & World Report named BHS the top public high school in Central Ohio, fourth best in Ohio, and 132nd nationally.
- 2018: The Ohio Department of Education Report Card showed that, among high schools, BHS had the highest Performance Index Score in Franklin County, the highest percentage of students scoring Advanced or Advanced Plus in Central Ohio, and the fifth highest Value Added score in the state.
- 2018: Niche.com named BHS the eighth best public high school in Ohio.
- 2018: U.S. News & World Report named BHS the top public high school in Central Ohio, fourth in Ohio, and 185th in the nation.
- 2016-2017: The Ohio Department of Education released results which showed BHS to have the highest Gifted Performance Index Score, and second highest Performance Index Score, among public high schools in Franklin County.Ohio School Report Cards
- 2017: The Washington Post named BHS the most challenging high school in Central Ohio, fourth in Ohio, and 250th in the nation.
- 2017: The National Center for Education Statistics and research from TheBestSchools.org, a resource for career and education guidance, ranked Bexley High School as the top public high school in Central Ohio, second best in Ohio, and 62nd nationally.
- 2016: Newsweek named BHS 120th nationally, seventh in Ohio, and first in Central Ohio. In its companion study Beating the Odds (based on performance, while accounting for student poverty rates), BHS was 91st nationally and first in Central Ohio.
- 2016: Bexley Schools was No. 1 for Franklin County school districts in multiple categories including SAT Mean Score (1783), percentage of students taking AP courses (82.8%), and percentage of students receiving an AP score of 3 or higher (68.3%).

== Eastland-Fairfield Career & Technical School ==
School	Location	Satellite Locations	School Districts	Grades
Eastland-Fairfield Career & Technical Schools	Eastland: Groveport, Ohio Fairfield: Carrol, Ohio	Lincoln High School; Groveport Madison High School; New Albany High School; Pickerington High School North; Reynoldsburg High School; Canal Winchester High School	16 School Districts	11–12

== Notable alumni ==
- Natalia Fedner, fashion designer
- Ross Friedman, former Harvard and Columbus Crew professional soccer player
- Bob Greene (class of 1965), author, chronicled attendance in his book Be True To Your School
- Eileen Heckart (class of 1937), Oscar and Tony Award-winning actress
- Kevin S. Huffman, former Tennessee Education Commissioner
- Charley Pettys, former professional soccer player
- Josh Radnor, actor, How I Met Your Mother
- Captain Willard F. Searle, Jr, U.S. Navy
- K. B. Sharp, former Women's National Basketball Association player
- Gayle Smith, coordinator of the global COVID response and health security at the U.S. Department of State
- R. L. Stine, author
- Andy Tongren, musician, Young Rising Sons
- Les Wexner, CEO of L Brands and Ohio's richest person
