= Congregation Agudas Achim (Bexley, Ohio) =

Conservative synagogue

Agudas Achim
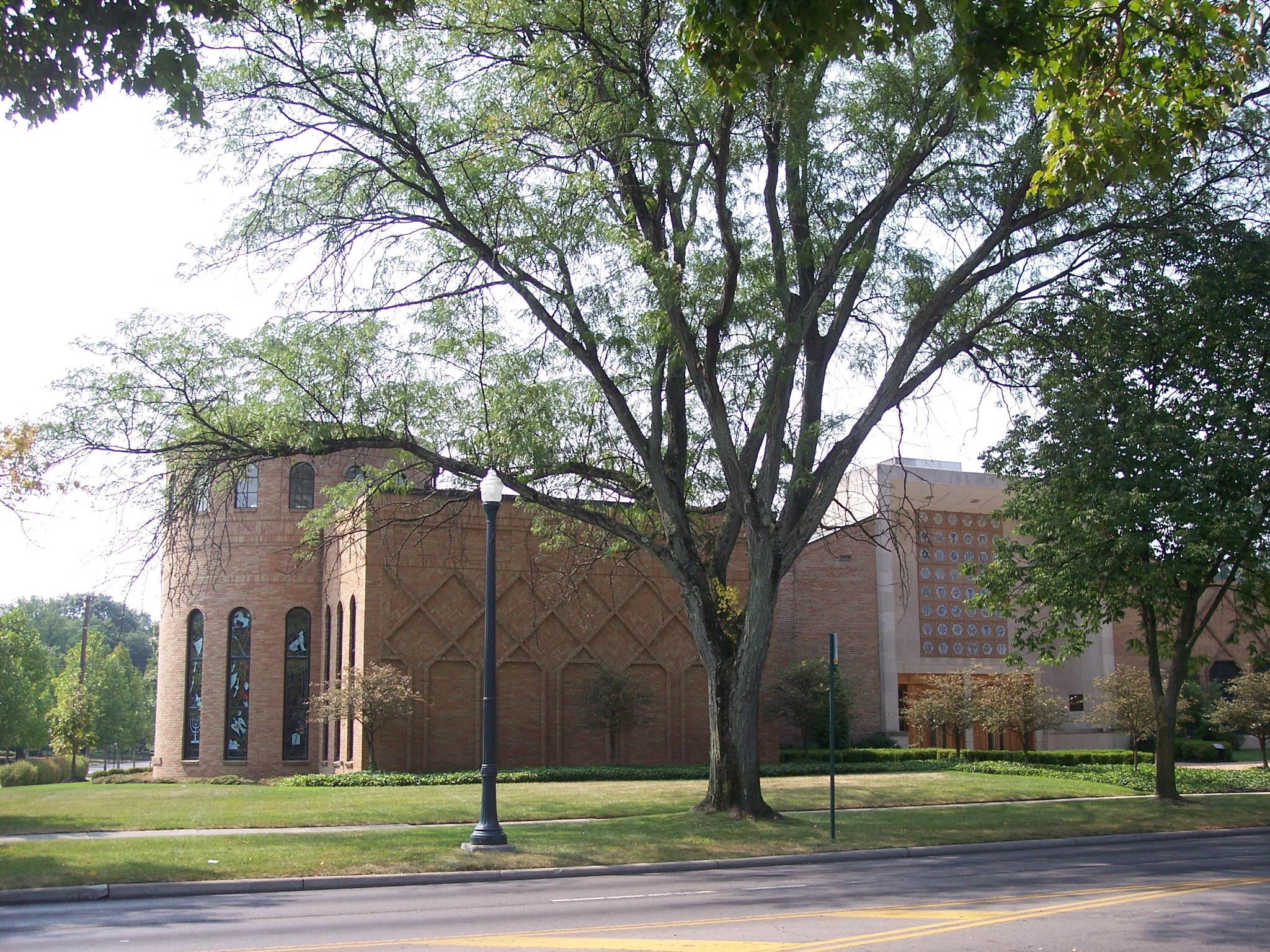
- Agudas Achim, in 2011

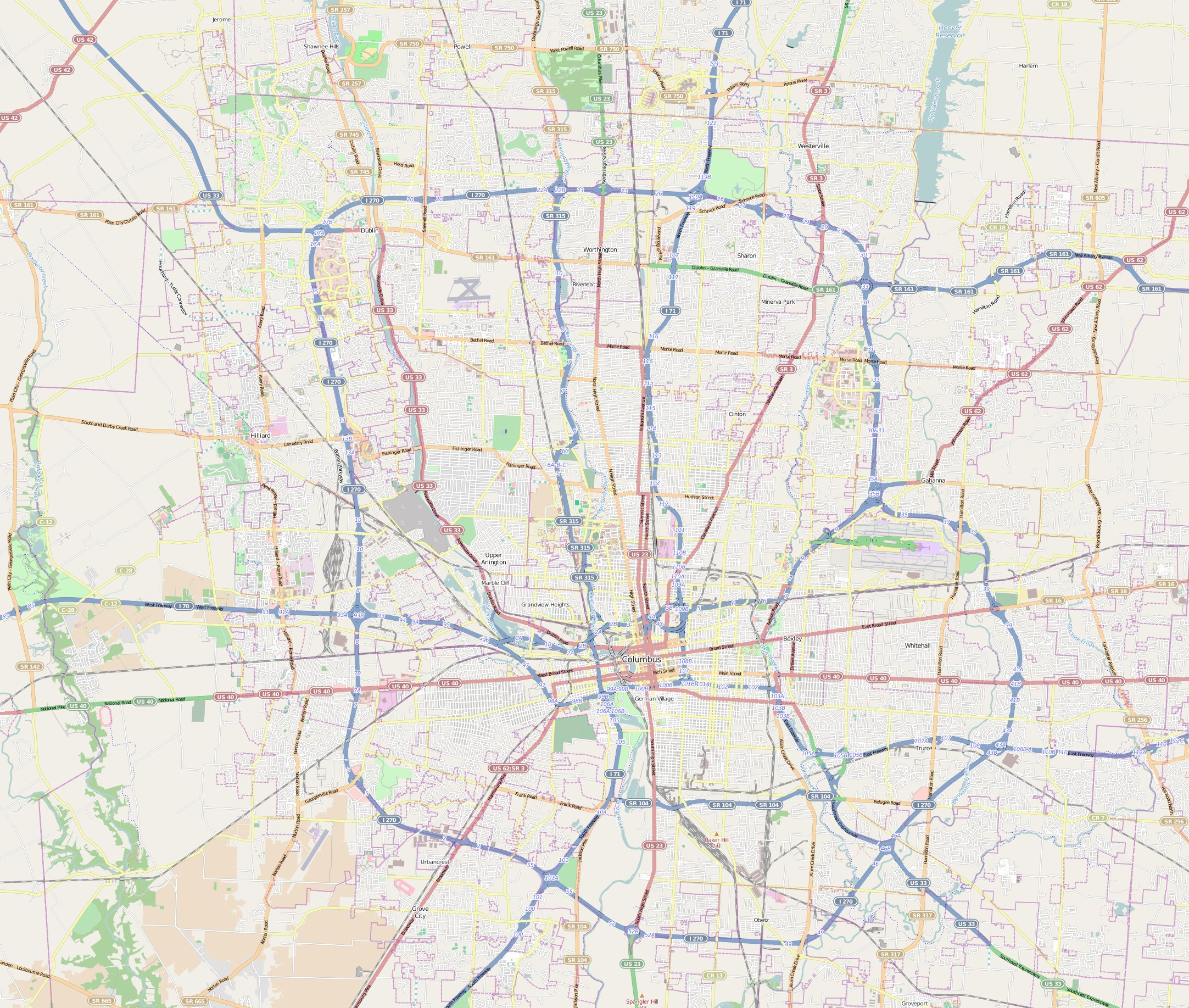
- Location in Columbus, Ohio

Religion
- Affiliation: Conservative Judaism
- Ecclesiastical or organizational status: Synagogue
- Leadership: Rabbi Josh Warshawsky (Rabbi-in-Residence)
- Status: Active

Location
- Location: 2767 East Broad Street, Bexley, Columbus, Ohio 43209
- Country: United States
- Interactive map of Agudas Achim
- Coordinates: 39°58′12″N 82°55′38″W

Architecture
- Established: 1881 (as a congregation)
- Completed: 1895 (South Fifth St.); 1907 (Washington/Donaldson Sts.); 1951 (Broad/Roosevelt Sts.)

Website
- agudasachim.org

Agudas Achim is a Conservative synagogue located in Bexley, Ohio, in the United States. It was established in Columbus in 1881, and by 1897 was no longer the only Orthodox synagogue in the city. Presently, Agudas shares Broad Street with three other synagogues - Ahavat Shalom, Temple Israel, and Tifereth Israel.

== Overview ==
A well-known Agudas cemetery is located not too far from the synagogue, off Alum Creek Drive. Old Agudas Achim cemetery is still preserved.

In September 2010, Rabbi Mitchell Levine was appointed Scholar in Residence in order to allow the synagogue to place greater emphasis on Jewish education for all ages. In June 2011, he joined Rabbi Melissa F. Crespy as a rabbi of the congregation. In January 2011, Agudas Achim became the first synagogue to appoint a full-time Environmental Scholar in Residence, Ariel Kohane, to its staff.

== Affiliation ==
Originally Agudas came to Columbus as an Orthodox congregation. According to the synagogue's website and the Columbus Jewish Federation, the congregation is Conservative. The change in affiliation came after the congregation refused to comply with a responsum from the Orthodox Union calling for all Orthodox synagogues to put up a mechitzah.
