= Bexley, Ohio =

- City
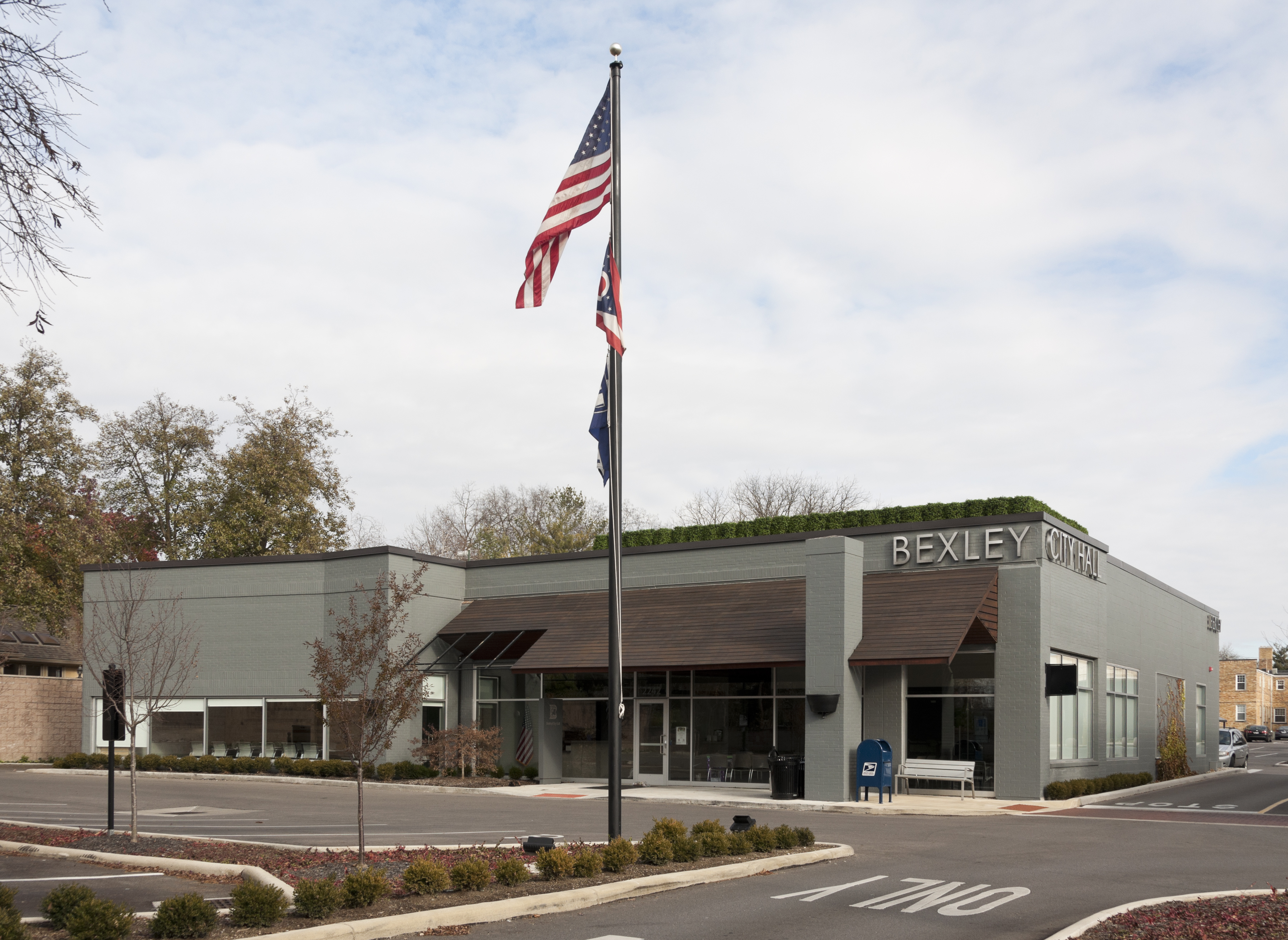
- Bexley City Hall

- Flag Seal
- Interactive map of Bexley, Ohio
- Location within Ohio Location within the United States
- Coordinates: 39°57′54″N 82°56′03″W
- Country: United States
- State: Ohio
- County: Franklin
- Incorporated: 1908 (village); 1932 (city)

Government
  - Type: Mayor–Council
  - Mayor: Ben Kessler

Area
  - Total: 2.44 sq mi (6.32 km^{2})
  - Land: 2.42 sq mi (6.27 km^{2})
  - Water: 0.019 sq mi (0.05 km^{2})
- Elevation: 791 ft (241 m)

Population (2020)
  - Total: 13,928
  - Estimate (2023): 12,785 ▼
  - Density: 5,750/sq mi (2,220/km^{2})
- Time zone: UTC-5 (EST)
  - Summer (DST): UTC-4 (EDT)
- ZIP code: 43209
- Area code: 614 and 380
- FIPS code: 39-06278
- GNIS ID: 1086097
- Website: bexley.org

Bexley is a city in Franklin County, Ohio, United States. The population was 13,928 at the 2020 census. The city is a suburban enclave of Columbus, situated on the banks of Alum Creek east of Columbus's Near East Side. It was founded in 1908 as a merger between the Bullitt Park neighborhood and Pleasant Ridge community, which met at the National Road (Main Street) which bisects the city.

Capital University and Trinity Lutheran Seminary are based in Bexley. The city is home to large estates, including the Ohio Governor's Mansion, the Jeffrey Park Mansion (a.k.a. "Kelveden"), and the home of the president of Ohio State University.

== History ==
Bexley was named at the suggestion of an early resident, Col. Lincoln Kilbourne, in honor of his family's roots in Bexley, in London, England. The village of Bexley was incorporated in 1908 when prominent citizens of Bullitt Park to the north along Alum Creek, including industrialist and 35th mayor of Columbus Robert H. Jeffrey, agreed to merge with the Lutheran community of Pleasant Ridge to the south near the Evangelical Lutheran Joint Synod of Ohio college, Capital University (established 1850) and the Evangelical Lutheran Theological Seminary (now Trinity Lutheran Seminary) founded 1830. Both educational institutions today are affiliated with the Evangelical Lutheran Church in America.

Bullitt Park had been founded in 1889, when Logan M. Bullitt of Philadelphia submitted his first plat for the area. Wealthy citizens of Columbus continued to build urban townhouses and country homes to the east along Broad Street and Town Road (now Bryden Road), extending to Franklin Park. By the 1890s, several large homes were erected across Alum Creek in the Bullitt Park area, one of which became the original campus of the Columbus School for Girls, still an exclusive girls' private school in Bexley.

The onset of the Spanish–American War was also instrumental in Bexley's history. In 1898, Ohio Governor Asa Bushnell chose a cluster of unsold lots around Broad and Drexel in Bullitt Park as an assembly site for state volunteers for the war. Camp Bushnell, as it was known, was home for three weeks to 8,000 Ohio recruits headed for Cuba. This led to the development of water and sewer lines for the soldiers, thus preparing the area for later real estate development in subsequent decades.

By 1908, the residents of Bullitt Park, north of Main Street, and Pleasant Ridge, south of Main Street, decided to merge their neighborhoods and incorporated as the Village of Bexley. The village reached the 5,000 population mark required by the state of Ohio to become a city in 1928 and, on January 1, 1932, officially became a city. William A. Schneider was elected the first mayor in 1935. Schneider oversaw construction of the first city hall and led Bexley through a long and profitable growth period. He remained in office for 32 years before retiring.

In March 2013, the city of Bexley was accredited as an arboretum by the Morton Register of Arboreta, making it the first city in the United States to successfully obtain arboretum accreditation.

== Geography ==
According to the 2010 census, the city has a total area of 2.45 square miles (6.3 km^{2}), of which 2.43 square miles (6.3 km^{2}) (or 99.18%) is land and 0.02 square miles (0.052 km^{2}) (or 0.82%) is water.

== Demographics ==
Historical population
Census	Pop.	Note	%±
1910	682		—
1920	1,342		96.8%
1930	7,396		451.1%
1940	8,705		17.7%
1950	12,378		42.2%
1960	14,319		15.7%
1970	14,888		4.0%
1980	13,396		−10.0%
1990	13,088		−2.3%
2000	13,203		0.9%
2010	13,057		−1.1%
2020	13,928		6.7%
2023 (est.)	12,785		−8.2%

Bexley is informally divided into three sections: North Bexley, consisting of the neighborhoods north of Broad Street; Central Bexley, the area between Main Street and Broad Street; and South Bexley, the area between Main Street and Livingston Avenue. The demographics of these three sections are distinct. North Bexley, particularly the Bullitt Park area comprising roughly the western half of North Bexley, is an area of large, mansion-like homes. Central Bexley consists primarily of large homes of between 2,000 and 4,500 square feet, and many residents are white-collar professionals characteristic of the upper middle class. South Bexley contains smaller homes, many of which have fewer than 1,500 square feet. Clerical and trade workers, as well as young professionals with small children, are more easily found among South Bexley residents, and the neighborhood would be seen as exhibiting many characteristics of the middle class.

Bexley is a community of primarily white residents with above-average resources. A plurality of Bexley residents are adherents of Mainline Protestant denominations. The city is home to two Lutheran (ELCA) churches, a United Methodist church and an Episcopal church, and not far outside of the city may be found three Presbyterian churches. Bexley contains many Jewish residents and is home to three synagogues (Agudas Achim, Ahavas Sholom and Torat Emet). The city also has a significant number of Roman Catholic residents, and three Roman Catholic churches are located just outside Bexley's borders. While still a small minority of residents, African-American and mixed-race families are becoming increasingly prominent in the community.

Bexley has grown increasingly progressive both politically and socially in the 21st century, a trend shared by other inner-ring suburbs in Franklin County.

=== 2020 census ===
As of the 2020 census, Bexley had a population of 13,928. The median age was 35.5 years. 26.3% of residents were under the age of 18 and 14.1% of residents were 65 years of age or older. For every 100 females there were 89.9 males, and for every 100 females age 18 and over there were 85.8 males age 18 and over.

100.0% of residents lived in urban areas, while 0% lived in rural areas.

There were 4,704 households in Bexley, of which 42.3% had children under the age of 18 living in them. Of all households, 61.3% were married-couple households, 11.8% were households with a male householder and no spouse or partner present, and 23.0% were households with a female householder and no spouse or partner present. About 22.2% of all households were made up of individuals and 11.3% had someone living alone who was 65 years of age or older.

There were 4,942 housing units, of which 4.8% were vacant. Among occupied housing units, 76.6% were owner-occupied and 23.4% were renter-occupied. The homeowner vacancy rate was 0.9% and the rental vacancy rate was 6.4%.

Racial composition as of the 2020 census
Race	Number	Percent
White	11,744	84.3%
Black or African American	845	6.1%
American Indian and Alaska Native	15	0.1%
Asian	299	2.1%
Native Hawaiian and Other Pacific Islander	6	<0.1%
Some other race	144	1.0%
Two or more races	875	6.3%
Hispanic or Latino (of any race)	442	3.2%

=== 2010 census ===
As of the 2010 United States census, there were 13,057 people, 4,661 households, and 3,281 families residing in the city. The population density was 5,373.3 inhabitants per square mile (2,074.6/km^{2}). There were 5,041 housing units at an average density of 2,074.5 per square mile (801.0/km^{2}). The racial makeup of the city was 89.6% White, 5.9% African American, 0.1% Native American, 1.5% Asian, 0.4% from other races, and 2.5% from two or more races. Hispanic or Latino of any race were 1.8% of the population.

There were 4,661 households, of which 38.2% had children under the age of 18 living with them, 57.6% were married couples living together, 9.4% had a female householder with no husband present, 3.4% had a male householder with no wife present, and 29.6% were non-families. 23.5% of all households were made up of individuals, and 10% had someone living alone who was 65 years of age or older. The average household size was 2.59 and the average family size was 3.09.

The median age in the city was 35.5 years. 25.7% of residents were under the age of 18; 15.3% were between the ages of 18 and 24; 21.4% were from 25 to 44; 27.4% were from 45 to 64; and 10.1% were 65 years of age or older. The gender makeup of the city was 46.9% male and 53.1% female.

=== 2000 census ===
As of the 2000 United States census, there were 13,203 people, 4,705 households, and 3,387 families residing in the city. The population density was 5,398.4 people per square mile (2,080.7 per km^{2}). There were 4,974 housing units at an average density of 2,033.8 per square mile (783.9 per km^{2}). The racial makeup of the city was 92.45% White, 4.48% African American, 0.17% Native American, 0.99% Asian, 0.05% Pacific Islander, 0.47% from other races, and 1.39% from two or more races. Hispanic or Latino of any race were 0.92% of the population. Bexley is also home to a large Jewish population and is considered one of the major Jewish communities in central Ohio.

There were 4,705 households, out of which 40.9% had children under the age of 18 living with them, 59.9% were married couples living together, 9.4% had a female householder with no husband present, and 28.0% were non-families. 23.7% of all households were made up of individuals, and 10.0% had someone living alone who was 65 years of age or older. The average household size was 2.59 and the average family size was 3.09.

In the city, the population was spread out, with 27.3% under the age of 18, 12.5% from 18 to 24, 24.4% from 25 to 44, 24.9% from 45 to 64, and 10.8% who were 65 years of age or older. The median age was 36 years. For every 100 females, there were 88.6 males. For every 100 females age 18 and over, there were 83.6 males.

The median income for a household in the city was $70,200, and the median income for a family was $83,363. Males had a median income of $56,573 versus $39,851 for females. The per capita income for the city was $37,375. About 3.1% of families and 4.6% of the population were below the poverty line, including 2.7% of those under age 18 and 6.5% of those age 65 or over.

== Arts and culture ==
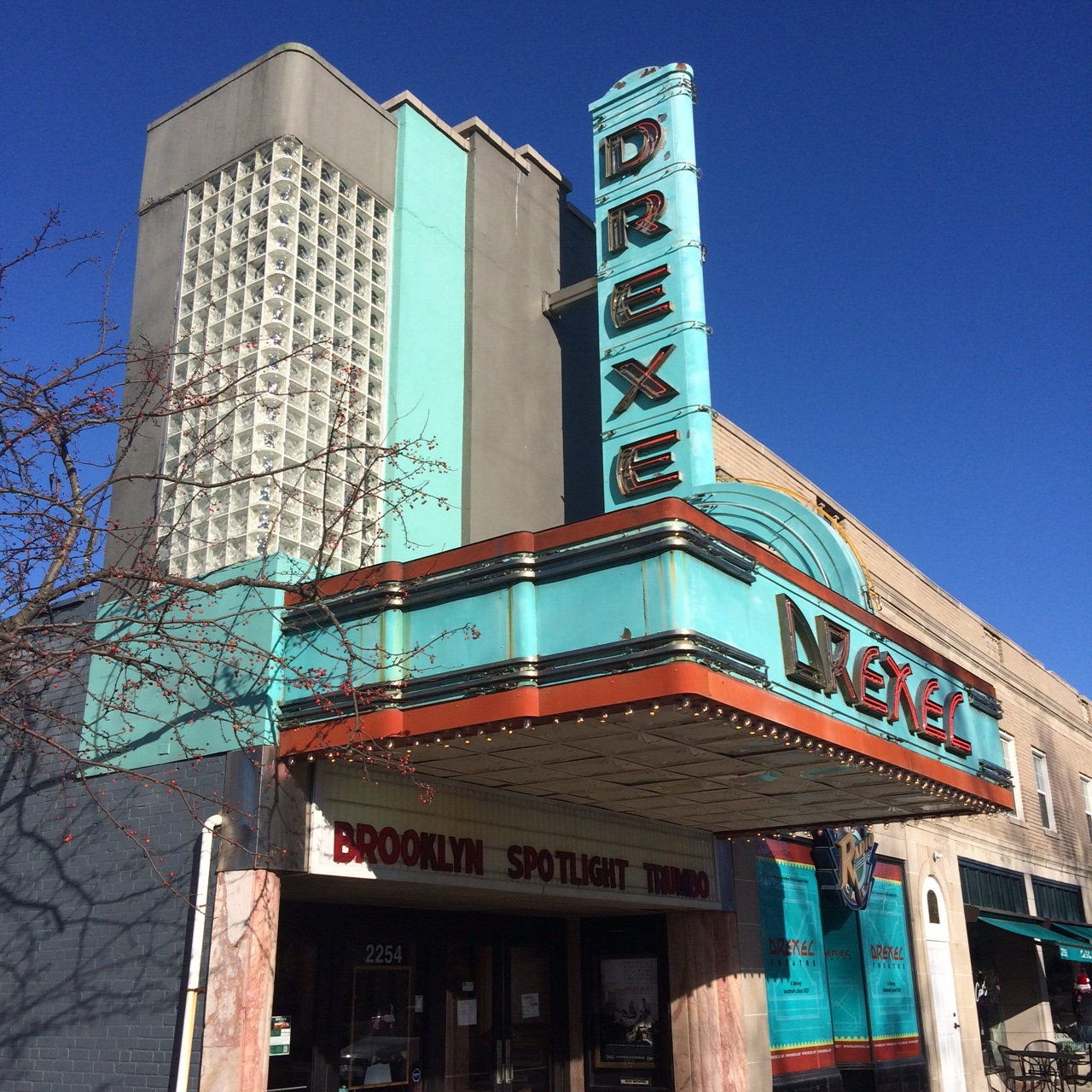
Drexel Theater

Bexley is home to several churches and synagogues, numerous historic sites and pieces of outdoor sculpture, and several miles of U.S. Route 40, known as the National Road. Adjoining Bexley to the west is the Franklin Park Conservatory.

The Jeffrey Mansion was built between 1903 and 1905 by Robert H. Jeffrey the son of the founder of the Jeffrey Manufacturing Company. It sits on nearly 40 acres (16 ha) of land in North Bexley, including two parks located on the east side of Parkview Avenue. The mansion is open to the public and offers cultural and arts education programs. The land behind the mansion is open to the public and includes stone staircases leading to walking trails along Alum Creek, tennis courts, and the Bexley community swimming pool.

Bexley houses several of sculptor Alfred Tibor's creations, including at the Trinity Lutheran Seminary, Saint Charles Preparatory School, and the Congregation Agudas Achim.

== Government ==
Bexley is run by a mayor–council government. The current mayor of Bexley is Ben Kessler, who became mayor in 2012 following the death of former mayor John Brennan. He previously served as the president of the Bexley City Council. The current president of the council is Troy Markham, who replaced fellow council member Lori Ann Feibel as president in 2022. The chief of police is Gary Lewis, who was selected for the position in 2022.

== Education ==
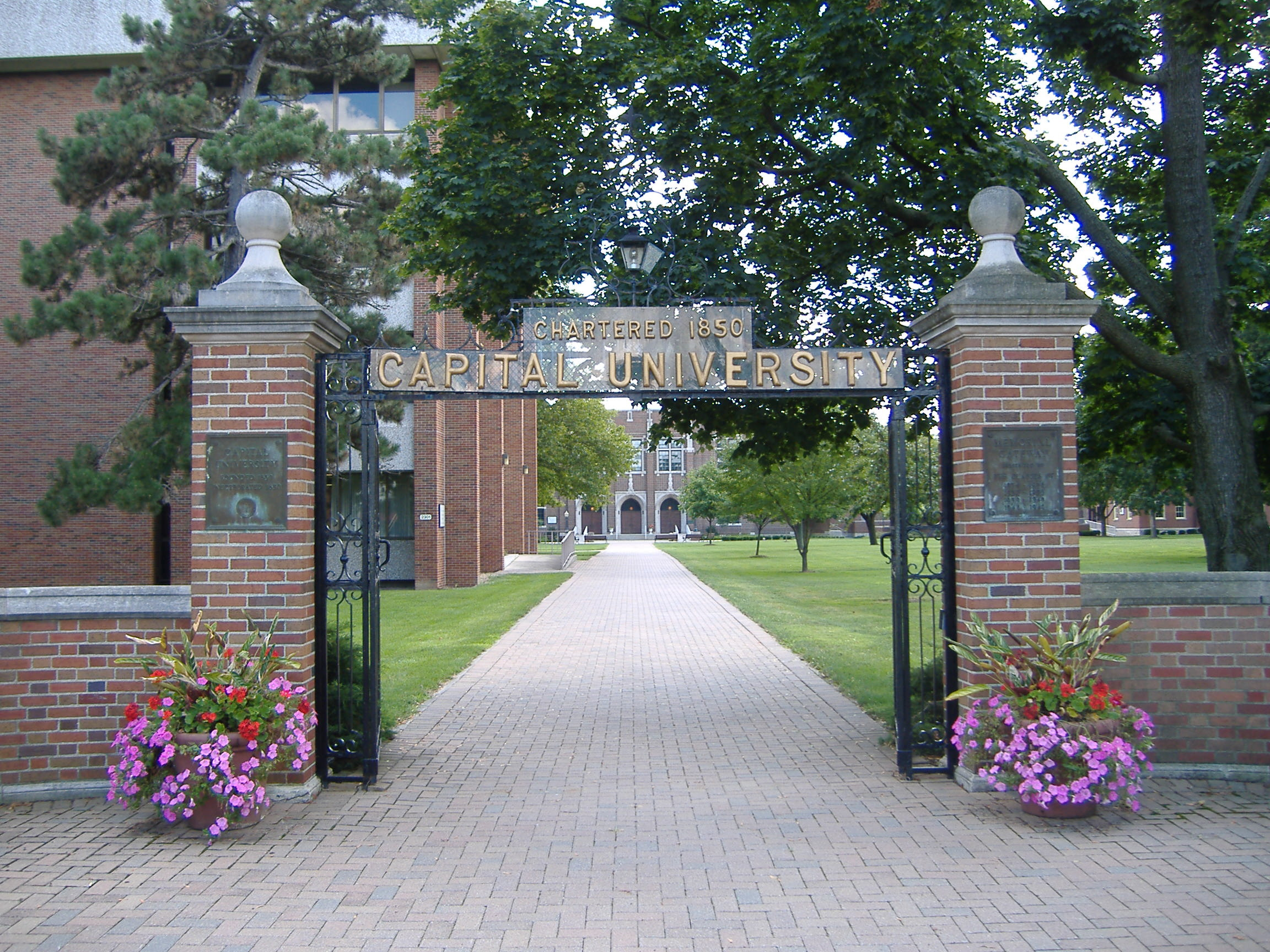
Capital University

Bexley's public schools are administered by Bexley City Schools, which consists of Bexley High School, Bexley Middle School, and three elementary schools. The city is also home to two private schools, Columbus School for Girls, the only all-girls high school in Franklin County, and Saint Charles Preparatory School, an all-boys Catholic school. Bexley was the original home of another all-boys private school, Columbus Academy; the school relocated to Gahanna in 1968.

Two higher education institutions are located within Bexley: Capital University, a private liberal arts university, and Trinity Lutheran Seminary, which is part of Capital. Capital University and Trinity Lutheran were founded in 1830 and are both affiliated with the Evangelical Lutheran Church in America (ELCA).

== Notable people ==
- Amy Acton, physician and governor-elect of Ohio
- Marco Arment, lead developer of the blogging website Tumblr
- Eliot Borenstein, professor of Russian and Slavic Studies
- Sherrod Brown, U.S. senator-elect for Ohio, and Connie Schultz
- Larry Flynt, publisher of Hustler, also lived in the city at one point before moving to Hollywood.
- Ross Friedman, Major League Soccer player
- Bob Greene, the former Chicago Tribune columnist, who wrote Be True to Your School
- Michael Jeffries, former chief executive officer of Abercrombie & Fitch.
- Sue Klebold, author and activist, mother of Dylan Klebold; grew up in Bexley
- Frank Lesser, a writer for the Comedy Central show The Colbert Report
- Josh Radnor, the star of the CBS sitcom How I Met Your Mother
- Laurie Lea Schaefer, Miss America of 1972, also called Bexley home.
- Maggie Smith, the poet and author, resides in Bexley, Ohio
- R. L. Stine, children's author
- Harvey Wasserman, writer and anti-nuclear activist, lives in Bexley
- Les Wexner
- David Wilhelm, 1992 Clinton presidential campaign manager and 2008 Biden presidential campaign senior advisor
