= Schocken =

Schocken may refer to:

- Schocken Books, a German publishing company
- Schocken Department Stores, a chain of German department stores
- an alternate spelling of Schokken, which was the former German name for the Prussian town that is now called Skoki, located in Wągrowiec County, Greater Poland Voivodeship, Poland

== People ==
- Deganit Stern Schocken (born 1947), Israeli jewellery designer and art curator
- Gershom Schocken (1912–1990), Israeli journalist and politician
- Gideon Schocken (1919–1981), British-Israeli military officer
- Salman Schocken (1877–1959), German entrepreneur
- Amos Schocken (1944–), Israeli businessman
