= Gadi Taub =

Israeli historian, author, and political commentator (born 1965)

- גדי טאוב
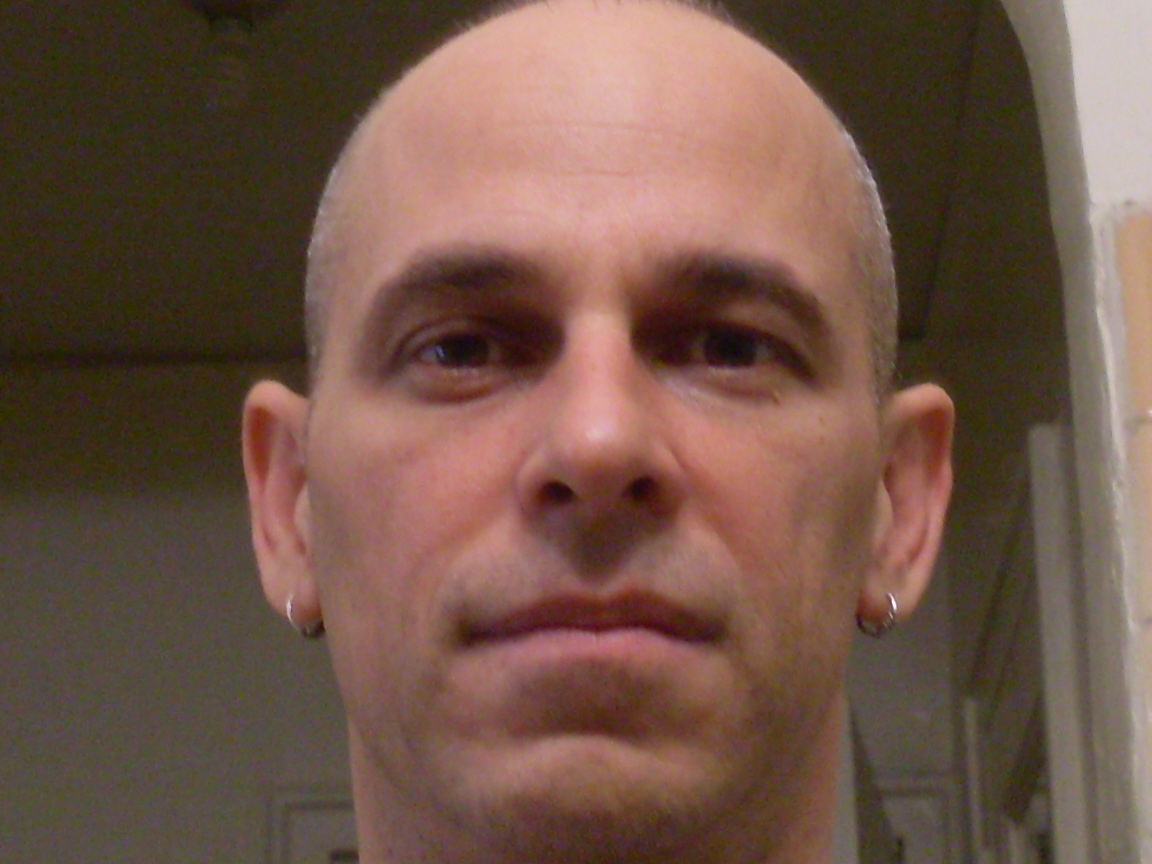
- Gadi Taub, 2009
- Born: April 19, 1965; Jerusalem, Israel
- Education: Tel Aviv University; Rutgers University
- Employer: Hebrew University of Jerusalem

Gadi Taub (Hebrew: גדי טאוב; born April 19, 1965, in Jerusalem) is an Israeli historian, author, screenwriter and political commentator. He is a Senior Lecturer in the School of Public Policy and the Department of Communications at The Hebrew University of Jerusalem. Taub is also an internationally recognized voice in the discourse on Zionism.

== Biography ==
Gadi Taub grew up in Jerusalem. Taub's maternal grandparents were Polish Zionist pioneers who immigrated to British Mandatory Palestine in the 1920s. His father and grandfather, Yitzhak and Yahezkel Taub, fled Czechoslovakia in 1939 after the Nazi invasion. When they arrived in Mandatory Palestine they were interned by the British. Later Yitzhak fought in the 1948 War of Independence. After the war, he studied economics and law, became a senior economist and journalist, and then chair of the Israel Securities Authority.

Gadi Taub attended the Hebrew University Secondary School and then did his 3 years' compulsory military service in the Israeli Air Force. From 1986 to 1998 Taub worked as a writer and presenter of children's programs on Israeli radio and television. Meanwhile, he completed his bachelor's degree in History and General Humanities at Tel Aviv University, wrote a book of short stories, and published a book of essays, "The Dispirited Rebellion: Essays on Contemporary Israeli Culture" [in Hebrew].

From 1998 to 2003, Taub studied at Rutgers University, New Jersey, where he received his PhD in American History. His thesis was on American liberalism and philosophical pragmatism. Meanwhile, he wrote a novel for young adults, The Witch from Melchet Street.

== Academic and media career ==
Since 2003, he has taught at the Hebrew University of Jerusalem. He became a senior lecturer in 2010. In 2007 he published a book about religious settlers that was translated into English by Yale University Press. Taub argued that the settlement movement is not a continuation of Zionism but its negation.

In 2009, he published a novel named "Allenby Street" about late-night bars and strip clubs in Tel Aviv. Taub was both creator and co-screenwriter (along with Erez Kavel) of a TV series based on his novel. The series was broadcast on Israel's Channel 10 in 2012. He was also a co-screenwriter and co-director of a prime time series for Channel 13, entitled Harem, about a polygamous cult.

Since 1996, Taub has been a columnist for Maariv, Yedioth Ahronoth and Haaretz. He has written political and cultural commentaries for the American and European press, including The New York Times, The New Republic, Die Zeit, Frankfurter Allgemeine Zeitung, and Corriere della Sera. He was a panelist on Channel 10's political show "Council of the Wise". He is a member of the academic council of the Metzila Center for Zionist, Jewish, Liberal and Humanist Thought.

== Views ==
=== Zionism of Liberty vs. Zionism of Land ===
Gadi Taub sees himself as a Zionist in what he calls the original meaning of the term, that is, a believer in the right of all peoples, including the Jews, for self-determination in their own nation state. He has expressed support, in principle, in the creation of a Palestinian state beside Israel in the future, although he has also clarified that Israel should not allow a Palestinian state at the moment. Taub distinguishes between the original Zionism, which he calls Zionism of Liberty (or Zionism of State) on the one hand, and a new messianic kind of Zionism which emerged among a minority of Israelis after the 1967 war, which he calls a Zionism of Land. Zionism of Liberty of the kind professed by Theodor Herzl and David Ben Gurion, sees Israel as an embodiment of the right of Jews to democratic self-determination, and is deeply democratic, while Zionism of Land is a "blood and soil" type of nationalism, for which the state of Israel is a means in fulfilling a mystical connection between the Jewish People and the Land of Israel. In Taub's view, Zionism of Land is not just an ideological negation of the original Zionism of Liberty, it is also the road to Israel's demise. The occupation of the West Bank not only violates the very right on which Zionism morally stands – the right of all peoples to self-determination as the Israeli Declaration of Independence declares –, it will also eventually lead to a bi-national state in which neither the Jews nor the Palestinians will be able to exercise self-determination. Therefore, Taub has been a vocal critic of the settlement movement and originally supported an immediate unilateral withdrawal from all occupied territories, with or without a peace agreement. However, he abandoned his support for unilateralism in the wake of the Second Lebanon War, which he felt "taught Israelis the harsh lesson...that unilateral withdrawal does not ensure peace unless there is some stable sovereign power to which authority can be transferred."

Taub is also a vocal critic of the post-Zionist left, which advocates a one-state solution to the Israeli–Palestinian conflict.

=== Immigration policy ===
Since 2016, Taub has expressed, in articles and public statements, consistent support of deporting unauthorized migrant workers from Israel, unless they are proven to be in real need of asylum. He has repeatedly argued that portraying populism as necessarily xenophobic was at its root a way to deny that much of its force is derived from democratic impulses that arise to resist the attempt to deprive citizens of a nation-state of the means to participate in shaping their own collective destiny. Like Douglas Murray, Taub believes that it is one of the most important tasks of our time to distinguish the moderate populist right from the racists at the margins of those movements. Taub hosted Murray at an event at Tel Aviv University addressing the subject. Critical of multiculturalism and intersectionality, Taub has repeatedly criticized the tendency to excuse the oppression of women and gays by Muslim communities, as well as the attempt to silence such criticism as motivated only by Islamophobia. He was originally in the anti-Trump camp, until it became clear that Trump was bent on stemming the rise of China to global hegemony, and stopping Iran's nuclear program. He also became critical of the "globalist elites", whom he dubbed (following Zygmunt Bauman and David Goodhart) "The Mobile Classes". In a series of Haaretz articles, he argued that these classes were using abstract human rights to undermine concrete civil rights, and free themselves from the traditional responsibilities that former elites felt that they owed their fellow citizens.

=== Feminism as a zero-sum game ===
Taub has also been a long-time critic of feminism some of whose adherents, he argues, have turned their back on the ideal of equality and adopted a conception of gender relations as a zero-sum game. His interview with Jordan Peterson explored these themes, which he first broached in his 1997 book, A Dispirited Rebellion.

=== Judicial Revolution and the collapse of the "Trias Politica" ===
Taub has positioned himself as one of the most outspoken critics of the Israeli Supreme Court. He stresses that since Aharon Barak’s Judicial revolution of the 1990s, the supreme court has usurped the power of the elected branches of government (the executive and legislative branches). Taub claims that the judicial intervention comes in many ways and some are indirect, such as using the Legal Council's office to intercept legislation before it reaches the Knesset floor. Taub bases many of his claims on the works of known and widely acclaimed figures such as Professor Daniel Friedmann, in his book "The Purse and the Sword" and by Professor Amnon Rubinstein who wrote:

Thus a situation has arisen whereby the Supreme Court may convene and decide on every conceivable issue. In addition to that the unreasonableness of an administrative decision will be grounds for judicial intervention. This was a total revolution in the judicial thinking which characterized the Supreme Court of previous generations, and this has given it the reputation of the most activist court in the world, causing both admiration and criticism. In practice, in many respects the Supreme Court under Barak has become an alternate government.

Taub claims that the Israeli Supreme Court has appropriated authorization never before seen worldwide have grounds on Richard Posner review in The New Republic, on Aharon Barak's book "The Judge in a Democracy". Posner, a judge on the United States Court of Appeals for the Seventh Circuit and authority on jurisprudence, criticized Barak's decision to interpret the Basic Laws as Israel's constitution, stating that:

only in Israel do judges confer the power of abstract review on themselves, without benefit of a constitutional or legislative provision.

Other Israeli high-profile critics of Barak's judicial activism who upheld Taub's criticism, are former President of the Supreme Court of Israel Moshe Landau, Menachem Mautner – Professor of Comparative Civil Law and Jurisprudence at the Tel Aviv University, and Ruth Gavison – Law professor at the Hebrew University of Jerusalem and a member of the Israel Academy of Sciences and Humanities.

Taub claims that his main concern is to the judicial system which is losing the public confidence, which is, ultimately, the only real basis of its power. Taub's criticism of the Supreme court's interventionist tendency was subjected to frequent criticism and personal attacks in the Haaretz op-ed pages.

=== Palestine ===
Taub has become disillusioned regarding the prospects of peace between Israelis and Palestinians. He has since become a vigorous critic of what he portrays as Palestinian recalcitrance and rejectionism – most recently their rejection of U.S. President Trump's 2020 plan.

== Personal life ==
Taub married Kati Kimchi in 1998, and the couple divorced in 1999. He was then in several relationships, including with actress Smadar Kilchinsky and journalist Natasha Mozgovaya. Since 2017 he is in a relationship with Vlada Taub, a Ukrainian citizen, whom he married in June 2019. They divorced several years later.

== Published works ==
=== Political and social science ===
- The Settlers and the Struggle over the Meaning of Zionism (2010, Hebrew, English)
- A Dispirited Rebellion: Essays on Contemporary Israeli Culture (1997, Hebrew)
- Against Solitude: Impressions (2011, essays, Hebrew)

=== Fiction ===
- Allenby Street (2009, novel, Hebrew)
- What Might Have Happened Had We Forgotten Dov (1992, short stories, Hebrew)
- The Witch from 3 Melchett Street (2000, novel for young adults, Hebrew)
- The Giraffe Who Liked to Feel Sorry for Himself (children, 2003 Hebrew, 2006 English)
- The Deer Who Liked Everything Clean (2005, children, Hebrew)
- Things I Keep to Myself (1990, children, Hebrew)
- Things I Keep From Yael (1992, children, Hebrew)
- The Lion Who Thought He was a Coward (2007, children, Hebrew)
