= Mozgovoy =

Mozgovoy or Mozgovoi (Russian: Мозговой) is a Russian masculine surname; its feminine counterpart is Mozgovaya or Mozgovaia (Russian: Мозговая). Notable people with the surname include:

- Aleksey Mozgovoy (1975–2015), pro-Russian separatist leader in the Lugansk Republic
- Bogdan Mozgovoi (born 2000), a Russian Paralympic swimmer
- Mykola Mozhovyy (1947–2010), Ukrainian and Soviet composer, producer, and songwriter
- Natasha Mozgovaya (born 1979), an American-Israeli journalist
