= State Museum of Archaeology Chemnitz =

- Staatliches Museum für Archäologie Chemnitz
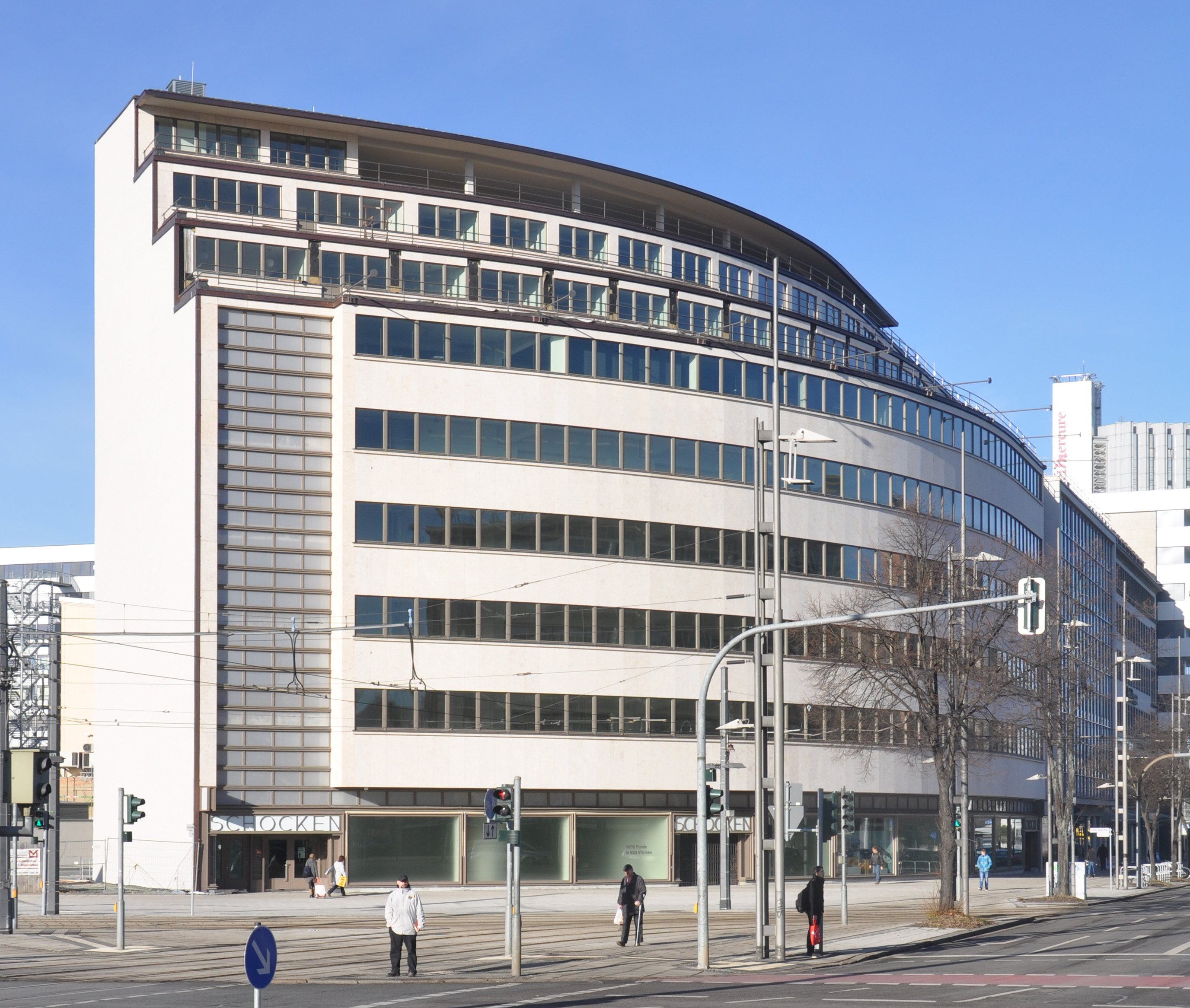
- State Museum of Archaeology Chemnitz in the former Schocken department store
- Established: 15 May 2014
- Location: Stefan-Heym-Platz 1, 09111 Chemnitz, Germany
- Coordinates: 50.83402°N 12.925186°E
- Director: Sabine Wolfram
- Architect: Erich Mendelsohn
- Owner: Free State of Saxony
- Website: www.smac.sachsen.de/en/index.html#1

The State Museum of Archaeology Chemnitz (German: Staatliches Museum für Archäologie Chemnitz), abbreviated smac, is the archaeological and cultural-historical museum of the Free State of Saxony. It is in Chemnitz, Germany, and was opened on 15 May 2014 in the former Schocken department store. It is the successor institution to the State Museum of Prehistory Dresden (Landesmuseum für Vorgeschichte Dresden). The State Museum of Archaeology Chemnitz is part of the Archaeological Heritage Service (Landesamt für Archäologie Sachsen).

With the opening of the museum, Saxony has its first statewide permanent exhibition on archaeology. It covers 300,000 years of human history in Saxony and ends with the period of industrialization. Three smaller exhibitions are dedicated to the history of the department store, the department store founder Salman Schocken and the architect of the building Erich Mendelsohn.

== Permanent exhibition ==
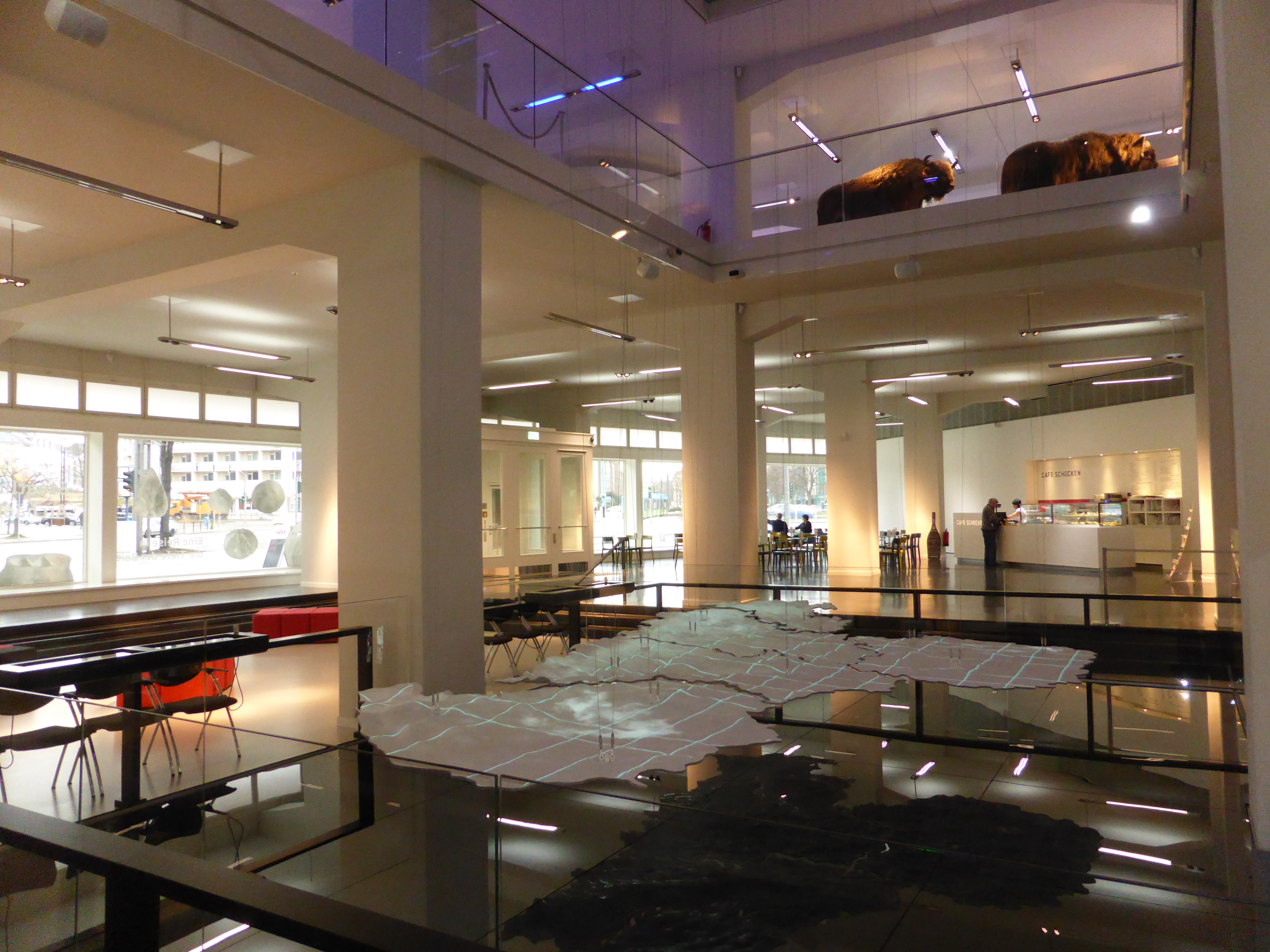
The kinetic sculpture in the foyer of the smac consists of five different parts. Individual information can be accessed via touchscreens.

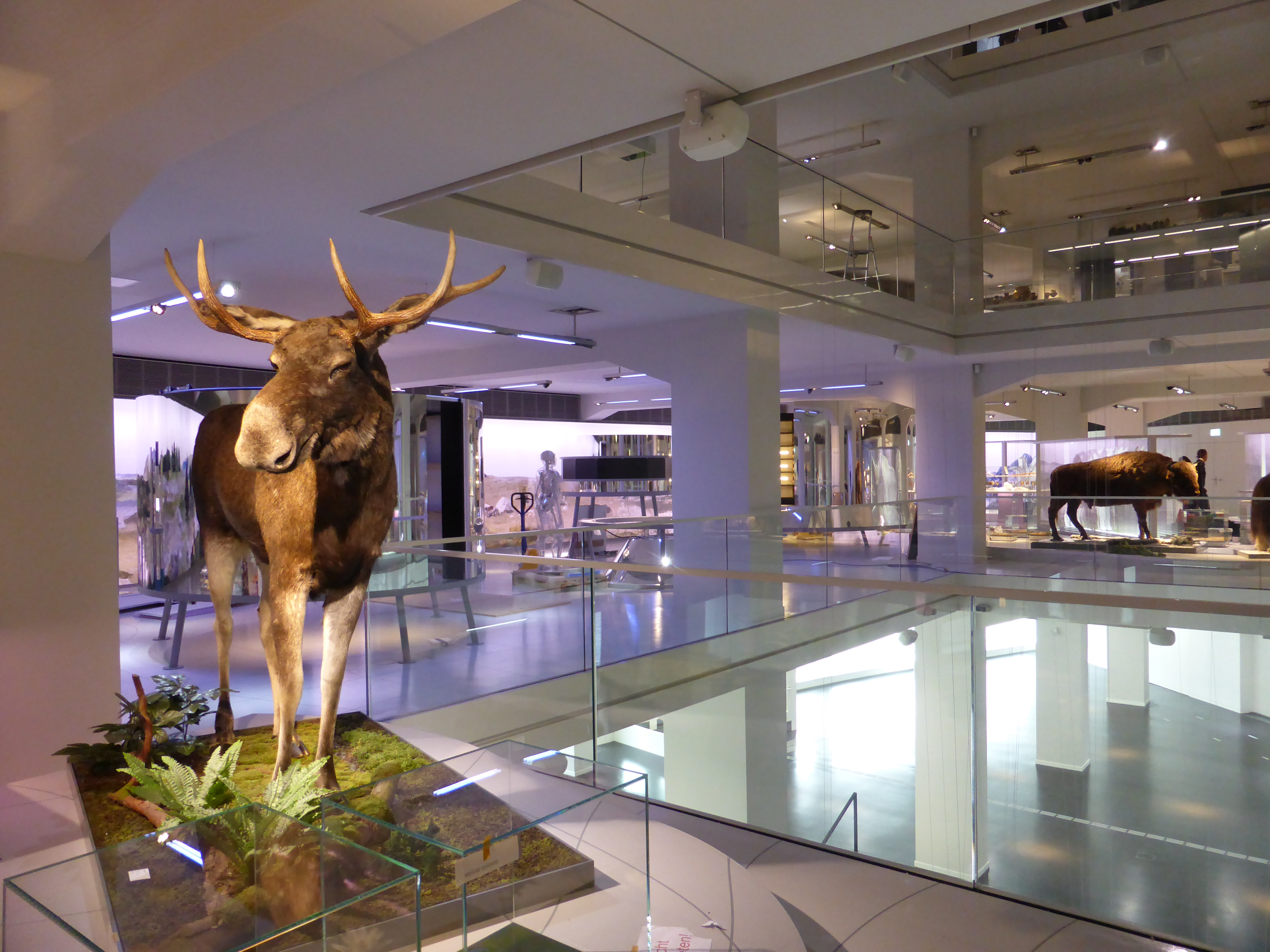
View of the first floor of the permanent archaeological exhibition. The Glass Neanderthal can be seen in the background.

The development of Saxony from the time of the first hunters and gatherers to the beginning of industrialization is presented in a three-story exhibition on approximately 3,000 square metres (32,000 sq ft).

The first floor covers the longest period of time in the permanent archaeological exhibition, spanning almost 300,000 years. The oldest stone tools from the Middle Paleolithic period come from the Markkleeberg site. The depictions of horses on the slate plate from the Groitzsch site near Eilenburg are more than 12,000 years old. Additional information can be found on climate history, evolution, anthropology, zoology, genetics and anatomy. In cooperation with the Max Planck Institute for Evolutionary Anthropology in Leipzig, a museum laboratory was created to illustrate the differences between Neanderthals and people living today. A special feature of the first floor is the "Glass Neanderthal". It is reminiscent of the Glass Man in the German Hygiene Museum in Dresden.

The second exhibition floor shows farming cultures from the Neolithic period (5500 BC) to the early Middle Ages (800 AD). On display is the 7000 year old wooden frame of the Linear Pottery culture well from Eythra near Zwenkau, one of the oldest wooden buildings in Europe. The completely preserved ceramic vessels decorated with bark bast and pitch from the Neolithic well at Altscherbitz near Leipzig are remarkable. The oldest clay figure in Central Europe with clearly male sexual characteristics from Zschernitz is located next to the Venus of Zauschwitz, a female idol from the early Neolithic period. The Saxon Bronze Age (2200–800 BC) with its treasure trove-like depots, e.g. the Bronze Age depots at Kyhna and Dobritz, offers another highlight of the exhibition. A mirror installation shows visitors how people dressed during the Iron Age (800–450 BC) and the Roman Imperial Period (0–375 AD). This transforms the reflection into a clothed and fully equipped person from the Iron Age or Imperial Period.

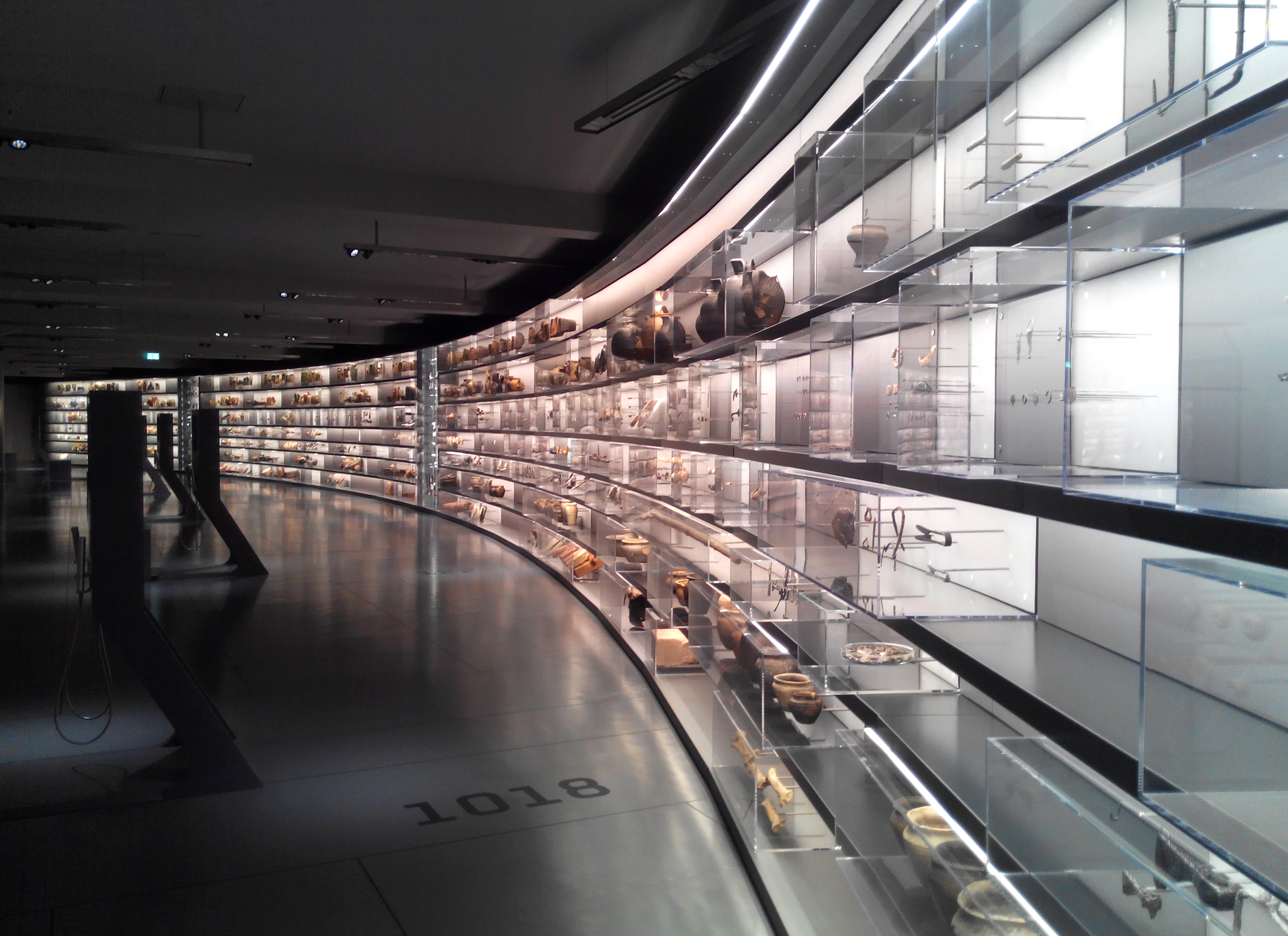
In the everyday life wall on the 3rd floor of the permanent archaeological exhibition, more than 1200 objects from Saxon city center excavations illustrate the medieval world of life.

The approximately 40 metres (130 ft) long rear wall on the third exhibition floor offers an insight into the medieval world with its presentation of 1,200 everyday objects from excavations in the Saxon city centers. With its formative influence on Saxon history, mining is the focus of the exhibition theme on this floor. In a "treasure trove of written records", the Dresden State Archives, as a cooperation partner, is given a showcase for the presentation of its holdings, which are otherwise hidden in archives. The tour of the permanent archaeological exhibition ends in 1839 with the opening of the railway line from Leipzig to Dresden.

In the separate bay windows along the curved window front, there are further permanent exhibitions. On the first floor, the life and work of the architect Erich Mendelsohn are presented using architectural models and documents. The second floor is dedicated to the history of the Schocken department store in Chemnitz, its importance for Saxony and its connections in the Jewish community. Department store co-founder Salman Schocken, a passionate collector of Jewish books and manuscripts, is presented on the third floor.

A landscape model of Saxony, floating through all three floors of the permanent exhibition, is located in the middle of the building. The relief, which can be changed via video projections, can dissolve into different regions of the country and reassemble. It shows different historical states of the country.

On the ground floor, visitors can access individual information via an interactive handrail. It is also possible to display information on the underside of the landscape sections using a mirror embedded in the floor.

== History of the former Schocken department store ==
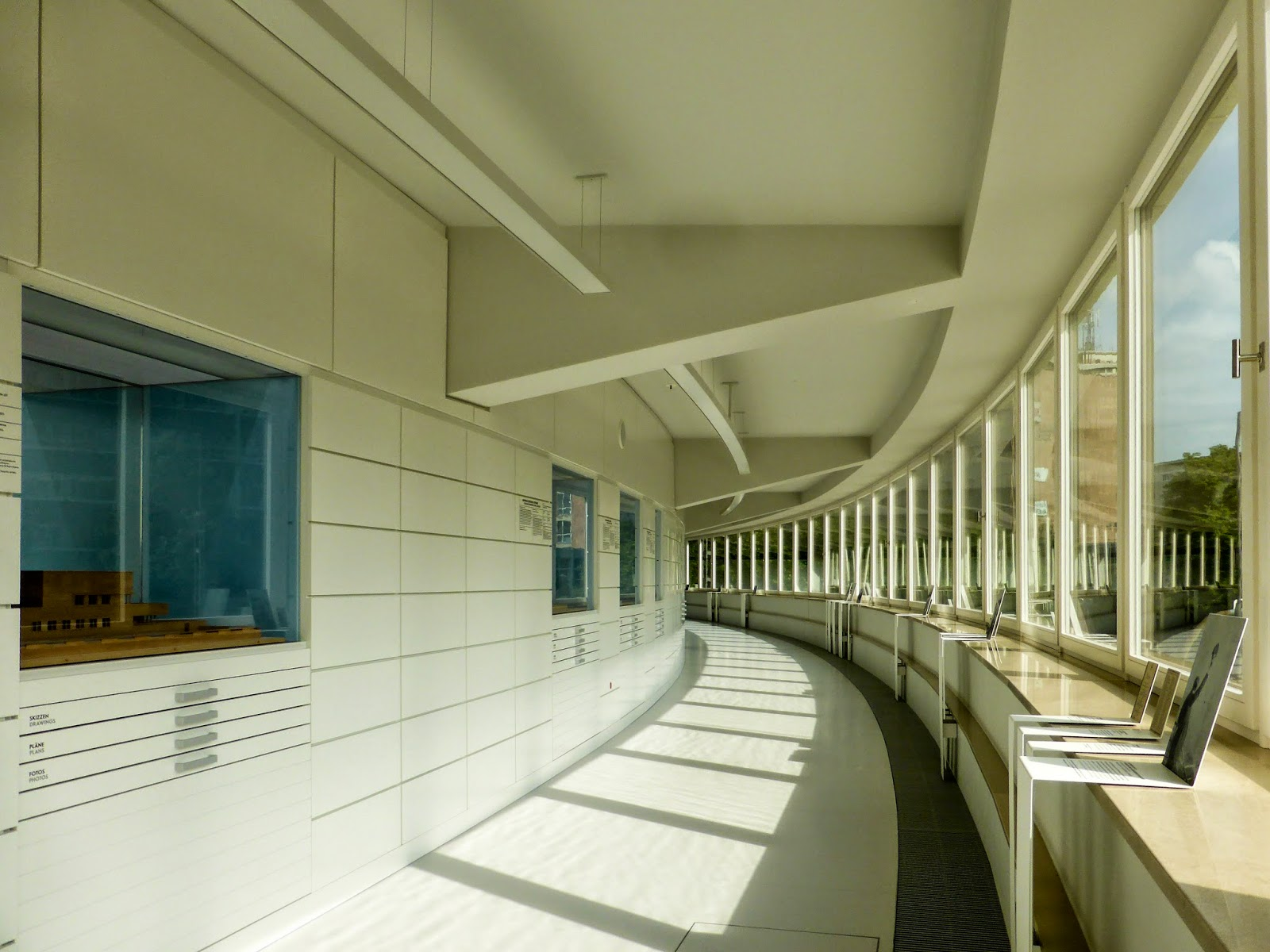
View of the bay window area on the 1st floor with the curved window front. Here is the permanent exhibition on Erich Mendelsohn with architectural models and documents on the life and work of the architect.

The building was designed and planned at the end of the 1920s by Erich Mendelsohn as a department store for the Schocken brothers' retail group. Construction began in July 1929 and it opened on 15 May 1930. With over 700 employees, the department store became an important economic factor in the city of Chemnitz. In 1933, the antisemitic Chemnitz Combat League for Small and Medium-Sized Businesses (Nationalsozialistischer Kampfbund für den gewerblichen Mittelstand) put the Schocken department store on the list of stores that the population should avoid. The store continued to do successful business despite the boycott, but the Schocken family was expropriated after the November pogroms of 1938 and had to emigrate to Palestine and the USA. On 9 December 1938, the company was renamed Merkur Kaufstätte Aktiengesellschaft, under which the department store operated from 1 January 1939. After the end of the war, Merkur Kaufstätte AG was re-expropriated. The State Insurance Institute, the People's Solidarity and the Chemnitz Consumers' co-operative moved into the department store, which was only slightly damaged. The consumer cooperative gave up the department store in October 1950. At the beginning of 1952 the building was taken over by the Handelsorganisation. At the beginning of 1965 the department store was affiliated to the newly founded Association of People's Owned Department Stores Centrum (Vereinigung Volkseigener Warenhäuser Centrum), based in Leipzig. The former Tietz and Schocken department stores were henceforth known as Centrum Department Stores (Cenrum Warenhäuser). In February 1991 the Kaufhof Warenhaus AG took over the department store, but later sold it again. After a long period of vacancy from 2001, work on converting it into an archaeology museum began in 2010. The client was the "PVG Projektierungs- und Verwaltungsgesellschaft Schocken mbH". The extensive conversion was carried out by the consortium of architects Auer Weber Stuttgart and Knerer and Lang Dresden. The exhibition design was carried out by Atelier Brückner Stuttgart.

== Special exhibitions ==
The fourth level with 1,000 square metres (11,000 sq ft) is available for special exhibitions. In addition, since 2019, special exhibitions have also been presented permanently online through the museum's own digital format smac + (smac Plus).

- SALZ BERG WERK (3 July 2015 to 17 January 2016)

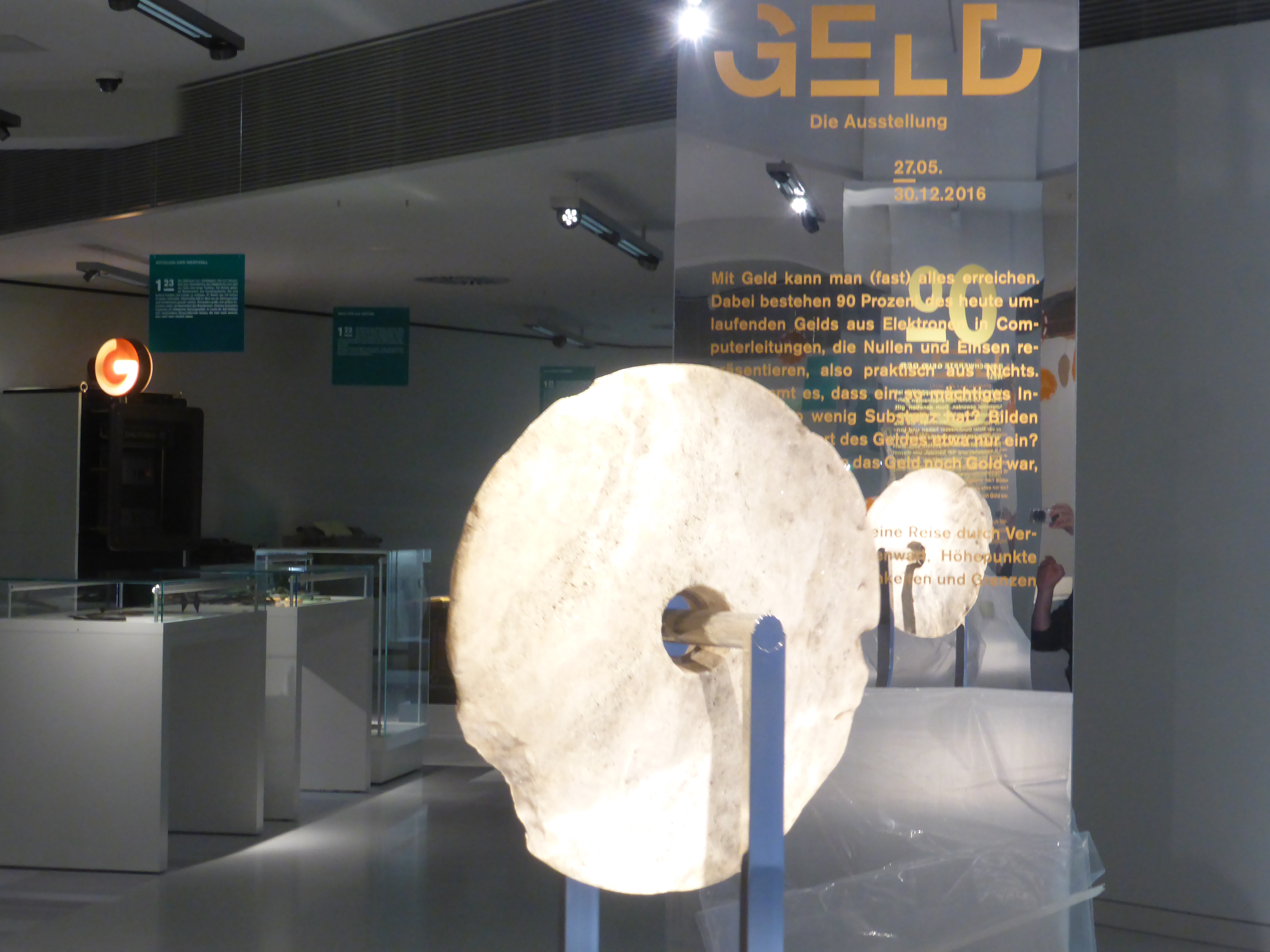
Special exhibition MONEY

- MONEY (27 May to 30 December 2016)
- Treasures of the Archaeology and Culture of Vietnam (31 March to 20 August 2017)
- Death & Ritual (16 November 2017 to 21 May 2018)
- Life at the Dead Sea (27 September 2019 to 12 July 2020)
- The City. Between Skyline and Latrine (1 April to 26 September 2021)
- Chic! Jewelry. Power. People (1 April to 28 August 2022)
- Home sweet home (26 October 2023 to 28 April 2024)
- Silver Shine and Miner's Death. The Mining Exhibition (25 October 2024 to 29 June 2025)

== Awards ==
The exhibition design and the time-dynamic Saxony model in the smac were several times awarded, in 2015 a prize of the cultural fund of the Niedersächsische Sparkassenstifung, the Art Directors Club awarded the bronze nail in the category “Communication in space | Thematic installation / exhibit”. and the RedDot Design Award. In September 2018, the smac in Aarhus also received the DASA Award from the European Museum Academy. The jury praised “the clear concept, the narrative / storyline and the excellent design.”. Including the DASA Award of the European Museum Academy 2018 the smac has received 14 awards and mentions.

== See also ==
- List of museums in Saxony
- Archaeology museum

== Bibliography ==
- Nicolette Baumeister, ed. (2014), Baukulturführer 84 Staatliches Museum für Archäologie Chemnitz (in German), Amberg: Koch, Schmidt und Wilhelm, ISBN 978-3-943242-37-9
- Jens Beutmann und Sabine Wolfram, ed. (2016), GELD. Die Ausstellung (in German), Dresden: smac / Landesamt für Archäologie Sachsen, ISBN 978-3-943770-25-4
- Antje Borrmann, Doreen Mölders, Sabine Wolfram, ed. (2016), Konsum und Gestalt, Leben und Werk von Salman Schocken und Erich Mendelsohn vor 1933 und im Exil (in German), Berlin: Hentrich & Hentrich Verlag, ISBN 978-3-95565-145-9
- Kulturbund e. V., Landesverband Sachsen, ed. (2014), Sächsische Heimatblätter, Zeitschrift für sächsische Geschichte, Denkmalpflege, Natur und Umwelt (in German), vol. 60, Chemnitz: Verlag Klaus Gumnior, ISSN 0486-8234
- Andreas Reinecke, LWL-Museum für Archäologie Herne, Staatliches Museum für Archäologie Chemnitz, Curt-Engelhorn-Stiftung für die Reiss-Engelhorn-Museen Mannheim, Deutschen Archäologischen Institut Berlin/Bonn, ed. (2016), Schätze der Archäologie Vietnams (Begleitband zur Sonderausstellung) (in German), Mainz: Nünnerich-Asmus Verlag, ISBN 978-3-945751-44-2
- Tilo Richter (1998), Evangelisches Forum Chemnitz (ed.), Erich Mendelsohns Kaufhaus Schocken (Jüdische Kulturgeschichte in Chemnitz) (in German), Leipzig: Passage-Verlag, ISBN 3-9805299-5-9
- Sabine Wolfram, ed. (2015), Archäologie eines Kaufhauses (in German), Dresden: smac / Landesamt für Archäologie Sachsen, ISBN 978-3-943770-21-6
- Sabine Wolfram, ed. (2016), Das Archäologische Museum in Chemnitz (Ein Buch über unsere Ausstellung in Leichter Sprache) (in German), Dresden: Neue Druckhaus Dresden GmbH, ISBN 978-3-943770-27-8
- Sabine Wolfram, ed. (2014), In die Tiefe der Zeit – 300.000 Jahre Menschheitsgeschichte in Sachsen (Das Buch zur Dauerausstellung) (in German), Dresden: smac / Landesamt für Archäologie Sachsen, ISBN 978-3-943770-15-5
- Matthias Zwarg, ed. (2014), Erich Mendelsohns Schocken in Chemnitz (Vom Kaufhaus zum Museum) (in German), Chemnitz: Chemnitzer Verlag und Druck, ISBN 978-3-944509-17-4
- Jens Beutmann, Jasmin Kaiser, Gabriela Manschus, Sabine Wolfram, ed. (2017), Tod & Ritual (Kulturen von Abschied und Erinnerung) (in German), Dresden: smac / Landesamt für Archäologie Sachsen, ISBN 978-3-943770-31-5
- Martin Peilstöcker, Sabine Wolfram, ed. (2019), Leben am Toten Meer (Archäologie aus dem Heiligen Land) (in German), Dresden: smac / Landesamt für Archäologie Sachsen, ISBN 978-3-943770-47-6
- Sabine Wolfram, Jens Beutmann, ed. (2020), Die Stadt (Zwischen Skyline und Latrine) (in German), Dresden: smac / Landesamt für Archäologie Sachsen, ISBN 978-3-943770-60-5
- Karina Iwe, Yvonne Schmuhl, Sabine Wolfram, ed. (2022), Chic! (Schmuck. Macht. Leute.) (in German), Dresden: smac / Landesamt für Archäologie Sachsen, ISBN 978-3-943770-67-4
- Christina Michel, Sabine Wolfram, ed. (2023), home sweet home (Archäologie des Wohnens) (in German), Dresden: smac / Landesamt für Archäologie Sachsen, ISBN 978-3-943770-80-3
- Jens Beutmann, Anton Gontscharov, Christian Landrock, Sabine Wolfram, ed. (2024), Silberglanz und Kumpeltod (Die Bergbauausstellung) (in German), Dresden: smac / Landesamt für Archäologie Sachsen, ISBN 978-3-943770-83-4
