= Aluf Benn =

Israeli journalist

- אלוף בן
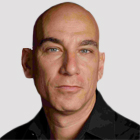
- Born: 1965 (age 60–61); Ramat HaSharon, Israel
- Education: Tel Aviv University, Northwestern University
- Occupation: Journalist

Aluf Benn (Hebrew: אלוף בן; born 1965) is an Israeli journalist, author and editor-in-chief of the liberal Israeli national daily Haaretz.

== Biography ==
Aluf Bomstein (later Benn) was born in Ramat HaSharon, son of Atida and 2010 Israel Prize poet laureate Aryeh Bomstein (who publishes under Aryeh Sivan). He was named for his uncle, Aluf Horowitz, who was killed in action in the Gaza Strip during the Israeli retribution operations of 1955.

Benn holds an MBA degree from the Kellogg School of Management at Northwestern University, and a degree from Tel Aviv University.

== Media career ==
He began working for the paper Ha'ir in 1986, and Hebraicized his surname Bomstein to Benn. In 1989, he moved to the newspaper Haaretz, where he served in various roles, including night editor, investigative reporter, head of the news division and wrote on security matters. His articles have been published in a variety of international newspapers, including The New York Times, The Guardian, Foreign Affairs and Newsweek.

On August 1, 2011, he was appointed editor-in-chief of Haaretz.
