= Walter Gross (journalist) =

Israeli journalist (1911–1995)

Walter Shlomo Gross (Hebrew: ולטר שלמה גרוס; 7 November 1911 – 19 September 1995) was an Israeli journalist of German birth. He joined the staff of Haaretz in 1949 and in 1951 became a member of its governing editorial board. He remained in a leadership capacity at Haaretz up until his death 44 years later, during which time he was also one the paper's main columnists. He also worked as the Israel-based correspondent for the British newspaper The Guardian during the 1950s and 1960s.

== Life and career ==
Born into a Jewish family in Stettin, Germany in what is now Szczecin, Poland, Gross earned degrees from the University of Königsberg, Heidelberg University, the Humboldt University of Berlin, and Goethe University Frankfurt (doctorate 1933). His doctoral dissertation, Die Revolutionen in der Stadt Rom, 1219—1254, was published in 1934 in the journal Historische Studien. After finishing his studies, he took a position with the Zionist Federation of Germany; working in their information office. He concurrently worked as an editor for a Jewish newspaper. In 1939 he migrated to Jerusalem. He served as a junior officer in the Haganah Zionist paramilitary force from 1941 through 1949.

At the invitation of Gershom Schocken, Gross joined the staff of Haaretz in 1949 as a parliamentary reporter. In 1951 he was named a member of that paper's governing editorial board in Tel-Aviv. He held that post until 1994 when he briefly retired, only to come back soon after and resume that role until he died in 1995. While serving as one of the paper's leaders, he was simultaneously one of the newspaper's most prominent columnists. He simultaneously served as the Israel-based correspondent for the British newspaper The Guardian during the 1950s and 1960s.

Gross died on 19 September 1995 in Bad Reichenhall, Germany.
