= Bücherei des Schocken Verlags =

German Jewish book series

The Bücherei des Schocken Verlags ("Library of the Schocken Verlag" in German) sometimes informally referred to as beliebte Reihe der Schocken-Bücherei ("popular series of the Schocken library") with its distinct, uniform style is widely considered "one of the most important manifestations of the spiritual life of Jews in Germany between 1933 and 1938" ("wichtigsten Erscheinungen des geistigen Lebens").

Conceived by Salman Schocken, in consultation with Buber, Moritz Spitzer, and Lambert Schneider, the series was "designed to select from the wellsprings of all Jewish literature texts of peculiar relevance to Jewish readers in Nazi Germany. In the spirit of the very first title--Isaiah's prophecies of comfort in the new translation by Buber and Rosenzweig--each selection vibrated with levels of meaning that comprised consolation and instruction." Spitzer, in his position as editor of the Verlag, invited Walter Benjamin to help with the series. Schneider, as co-owner, brought with him the backlist from his Lambert Schneider Verlag, including Die Schrift, the Buber-Rosenzweig translation of the Tanakh.

In a representative assessment of the imprint's impact, Ismar Schorsch writes:

What is most remarkable about this inspired series is its almost unbounded cultural range and the speed at which it was produced. The 83 titles convey a conception of Judaism as a religious civilisation that spans the Bible, rabbinic literature, medieval and modern Hebrew poetry, philosophy and mysticism, folklore and popular culture, letters and memoirs, modern belles lettres and poetry in German and Yiddish, as well as works of Jewish history and historical sources.

More remarkable still is the fact that the series, which began publishing six months after the Nazi book burnings, continued activity until the end of 1938, when the events following Kristallnacht made it impossible to continue. The last book in the series, Hermann Cohen's Briefe, although dated 1939, was actually printed in late 1938. The previous summer, volume 68, a reprint of Die Judenbuche, a novel by Annette von Droste-Hülshoff, was (save for a few copies) pulped by the Nazis. (A second volume 68, Schneersohn's Die Geschichte von Chajim was printed in its place.) From that point on, the series carried the Nazi-imposed "Jüdischer Buchverlag" (Jewish Publisher) on the title page of all volumes.

Although the planned two volumes a month was realized in only one of the five full years of publication (1935; the first five volumes were published in November and December 1933), "the production of a German library of 92 volumes of Jewish culture over a period of five years is testimony not only to the urgency of the hour and the dedication of Moritz Spitzer and Lambert Schneider, but also to the very existence of a living cultural legacy." All in all, the 83 titles represented over a third of the firm's production before it moved from Berlin to Palestine in 1939.

The series featured the first appearances (or translations) of major works by authors (such as S.Y. Agnon, Martin Buber, Franz Kafka, Franz Rosenzweig, and Gershom Scholem) who would become internationally recognized when the Verlag moved to New York, became Schocken Books, and began publishing these authors (many of them for the first time) in English.
