= The Witch from Melchet Street =

- Directed by: Dina Zvi-Riklis
- Written by: Alma Ganihar and Gadi Taub
- Starring: Rozina Kambus, Eyal Cohen, Benny Avni, Lupo Berkowitch, Sagit Emet
- Release date: 26 October 2007 (Chicago International Children's Film Festival)
- Running time: 50 minutes
- Country: Israel
- Language: Hebrew

The Witch from Melchet Street is a 2007 Israeli modern-day urban fairy tale about magic and first love. It is based on a book by Israeli author Gadi Taub and is geared towards both children and adults as it tells the story of the summer that Assaf fell in love for the first time with a neighborhood girl and became close friends with the witch who lived on his street.

== Summary ==
The Witch From Melchet Street is told from the perspective of a grown up Assaf, remembering what it was like to be young and in love and the quirky friend who helped him through it. Plagued by her own broken heart, the three-hundred-year-old witch (with a youthful appearance) finds it easy to sympathize with her little neighbor friend, who's spending his summer pining over a little neighborhood girl who hardly acknowledges his existence.

Nearly two decades after the summer Assaf is still gripped by his memories. Since then, the little girl has grown up and moved away, but Assaf never left. "When you live in the house you grew up in, your childhood is always right beside you", he explains. "You buy cigarettes where you used to buy popsicles, you sit at a cafe overlooking your old school".

Now, when Assaf spots his first love wandering through his neighborhood, he can't help but follow a few steps behind her. As he watches her walk, he remembers the little girl who, long ago, showed no remorse while breaking his heart.

== Awards ==
- Official Selection in Istanbul Children's Film Festival, 2007
- Official Selection in Chicago Children's Film Festival, 2007

== See also ==
Other dramas set modern in Israel:

- Alila
- The Postwoman
- You Don't Say
- Time of Favor
