= Amos Schocken =

Israeli publisher

- עמוס שוקן
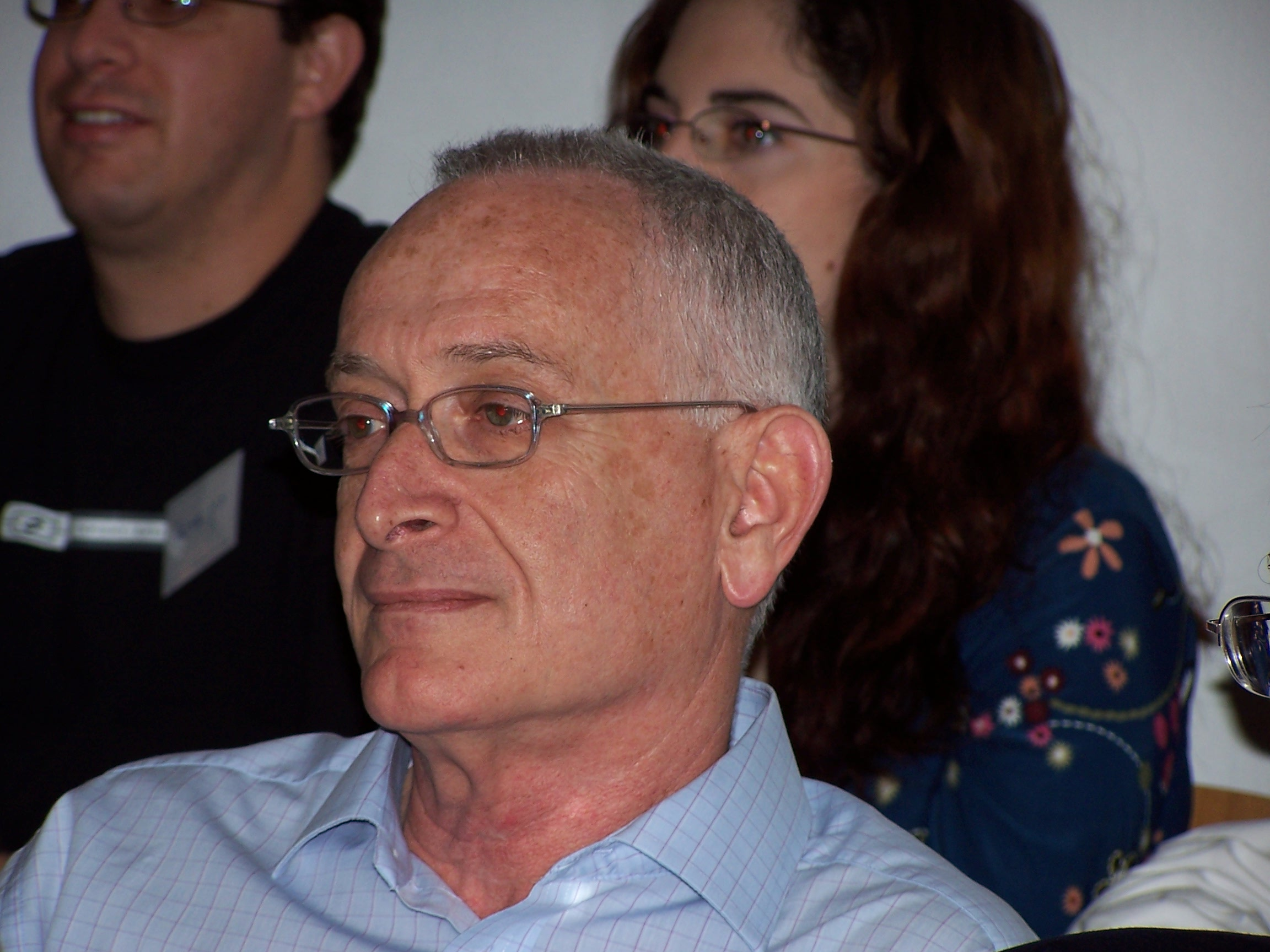
- Born: December 6, 1944 (age 81); Tel-Aviv, Mandatory Palestine
- Education: Hebrew University of Jerusalem
- Occupations: Publisher, businessman
- Father: Gershom Schocken
- Relatives: Salman Schocken (paternal grandfather); Shoshana Persitz (maternal grandmother); Gideon Schocken (uncle)

Amos Schocken (Hebrew: עמוס שוקן; born 6 December 1944) is an Israeli businessman who serves as the publisher of the Haaretz newspaper and the head of Haaretz Group. He is the son of Gershom Schocken, the former editor and publisher of Haaretz.

== Biography ==
Amos Schocken was born in Tel Aviv to Shulamit Persitz and Gershom Schocken. He is the grandson of Zalman Schocken, founder of Schocken Books, and Shoshana Persitz, a Zionist activist, educator and Israeli politician.

Schocken worked in various positions at the newspaper during his childhood, including as a newspaper distributor. Schocken attended Ironi Aleph high school in Tel Aviv. After serving in the Israel Defense Forces, he joined the newspaper as an administrative assistant. He earned a bachelor's degree in economics and statistics from the Hebrew University of Jerusalem and later completed a master's degree in business administration at Harvard University.

In November 2024, the Israeli government cut ties with the Haaretz newspaper over comments Schocken made at a conference in London, criticising the Netanyahu government for allegedly imposing an apartheid regime on the Palestinian population and referring to "Palestinian freedom fighters that Israel calls terrorists". After hundreds of readers protested by cancelling their subscriptions, Schocken responded "I should have said, 'Freedom fighters who also use terrorist methods and need to be fought against.' The use of terrorism is not legitimate."
