= Shoshana Persitz =

Israeli politician (1892–1969)

- שושנה פרסיץ
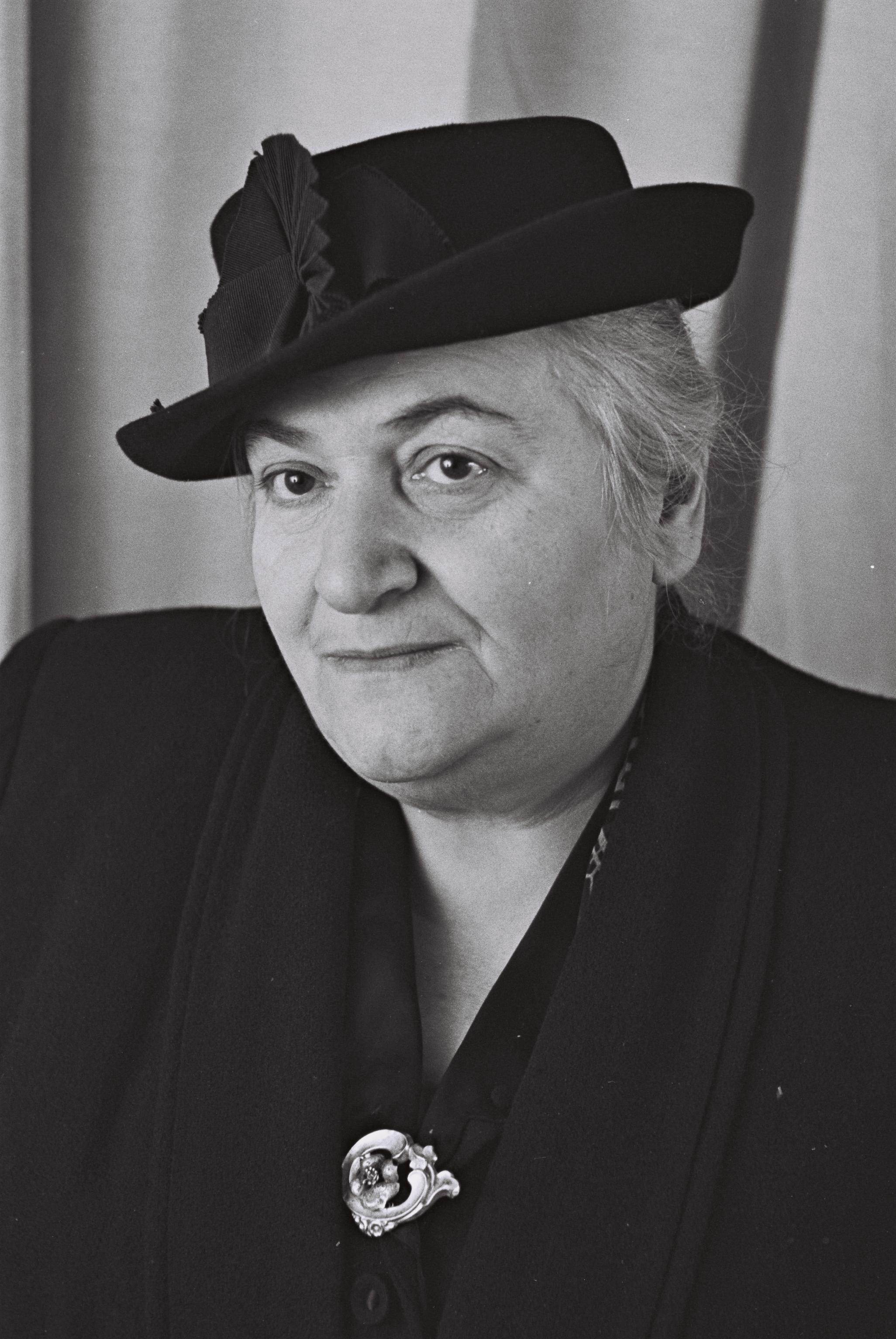

Faction represented in the Knesset
- 1949–1959: General Zionists

Personal details
- Born: 16 November 1892; Kiev, Russian Empire
- Died: 22 March 1969 (aged 76); Tel Aviv, Israel

Rosalia Gillelovna "Shoshana" Persitz (née Zlatopolsky; 16 November 1892 – 22 March 1969), also known as Shoshana Persitz (Hebrew: שושנה פרסיץ), was a Zionist activist, educator and Israeli politician.

== Biography ==
Rosalia Gillelovna Zlatopolsky was born in 1892 in Kiev in the Russian Empire (now Ukraine), the daughter of Hillel Zlatopolsky (1868–1932), a Zionist leader, philanthropist and co-founder of Keren Hayesod, and his wife, Fania (née Mirkin), a homemaker. Hillel Zlatopolsky had been decorated by France with the order of the Legion of Honor for his contributions to business. Persitz's brother Moshe died in Israel in 1956.

In 1909, she became active in "Tarbut” ("Culture"), an organization for the dissemination of Hebrew culture throughout the Jewish diaspora. In 1917, she founded the publication Omanut (Art) in Bad Homburg vor der Höhe, with her husband, Itzhak-Yosef Zelikovich-Persitz. In 1920, Persitz served as a delegate to the Zionist Congress in London. She studied in the universities of Moscow and Paris and received her degree in literature from the Sorbonne. In 1925, she immigrated to the British Mandate of Palestine, and adopted the forename "Shoshana". From 1926 to 1935 she was a member of the Tel Aviv City Council and head of the education department of the municipality and a member of the education committee of the Zionist Federation and member of the education department of the Vaad Leumi.

In 1932, her father was murdered in Paris by one of his employees, Leon Laval, who later committed suicide.

Shoshana Persitz was Chairwoman of the Supervisory Committee of the General School System and of the General Zionists Women's Organization from 1948 to 1954. She was elected to the first, second and third Knessets for the General Zionists and was chairwoman of the Education and Culture Committee.

== Death ==
Shoshana Persitz died on 22 March 1969. Her daughter, Yemima Milo, was a theater actress, director and acting teacher and one of the founders of the Cameri Theater. Another daughter, Shulamit, married Gershom Schocken, a politician and Haaretz editor. A street in north Tel Aviv is named after her.

== Awards ==
In 1968, Persitz was awarded the Israel Prize, in education.

== See also ==
- List of Israel Prize recipients
