= Schocken Department Stores =

Building in Chemnitz, Saxony, Germany

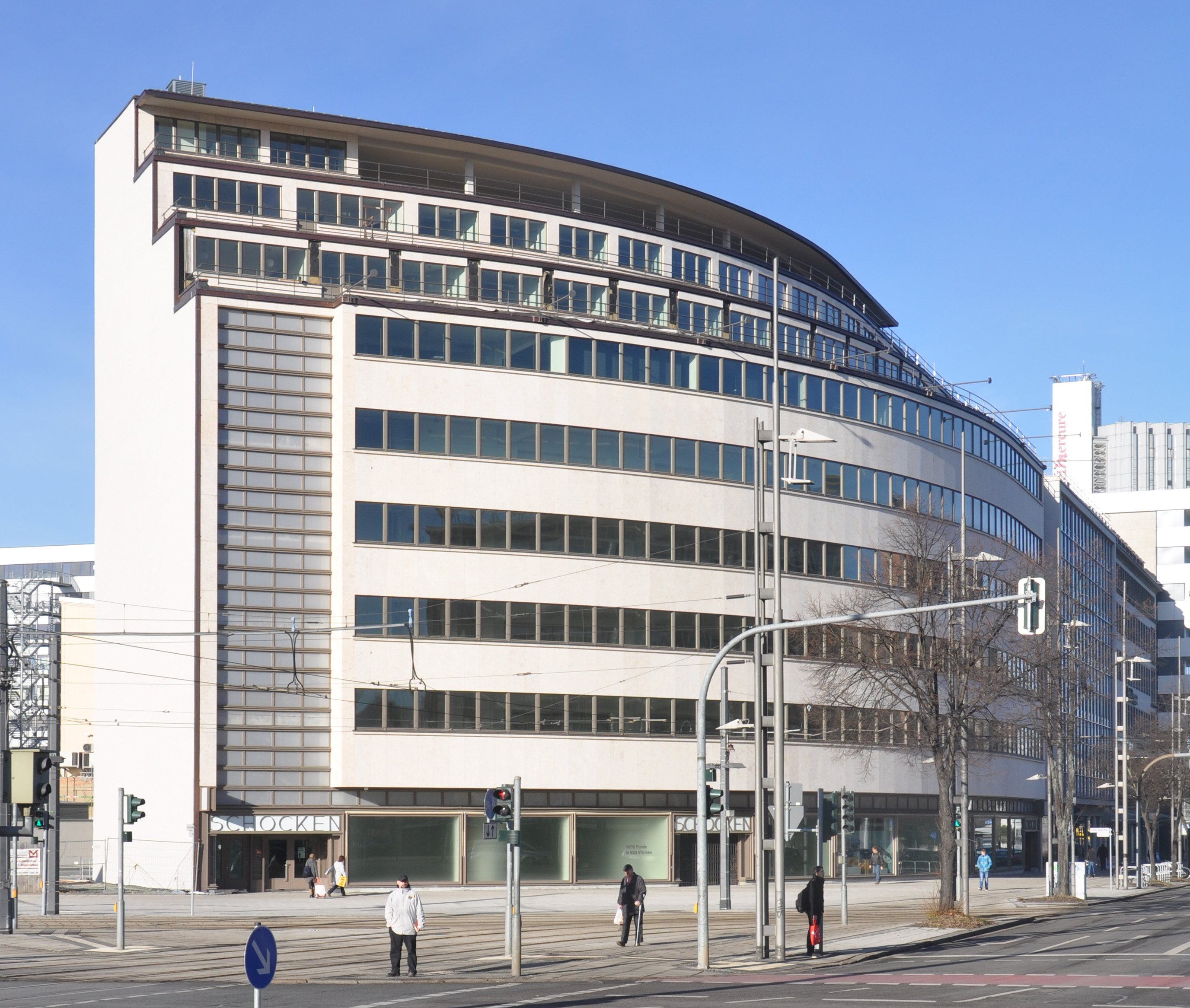
- Former Schocken Department Store in Chemnitz, shortly before re-opening as State Museum of Archaeology Chemnitz
- Native name: Kaufhaus Schocken
- Formerly: I. Schocken Sons
- Industry: consumer products distribution
- Founded: 1921
- Founders: Simon Schocken; Salman Schocken
- Headquarters: Zwickau
- Parent: Helmut Horten GmbH

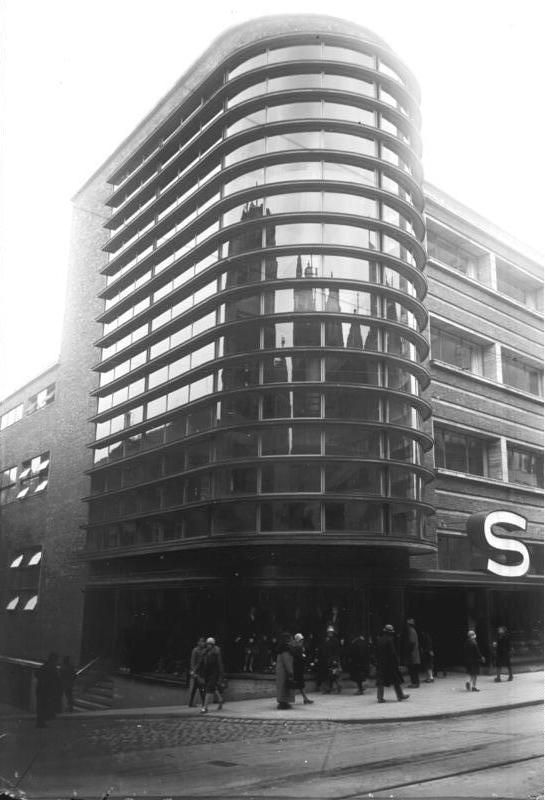
Schocken Department Store Stuttgart, 1928

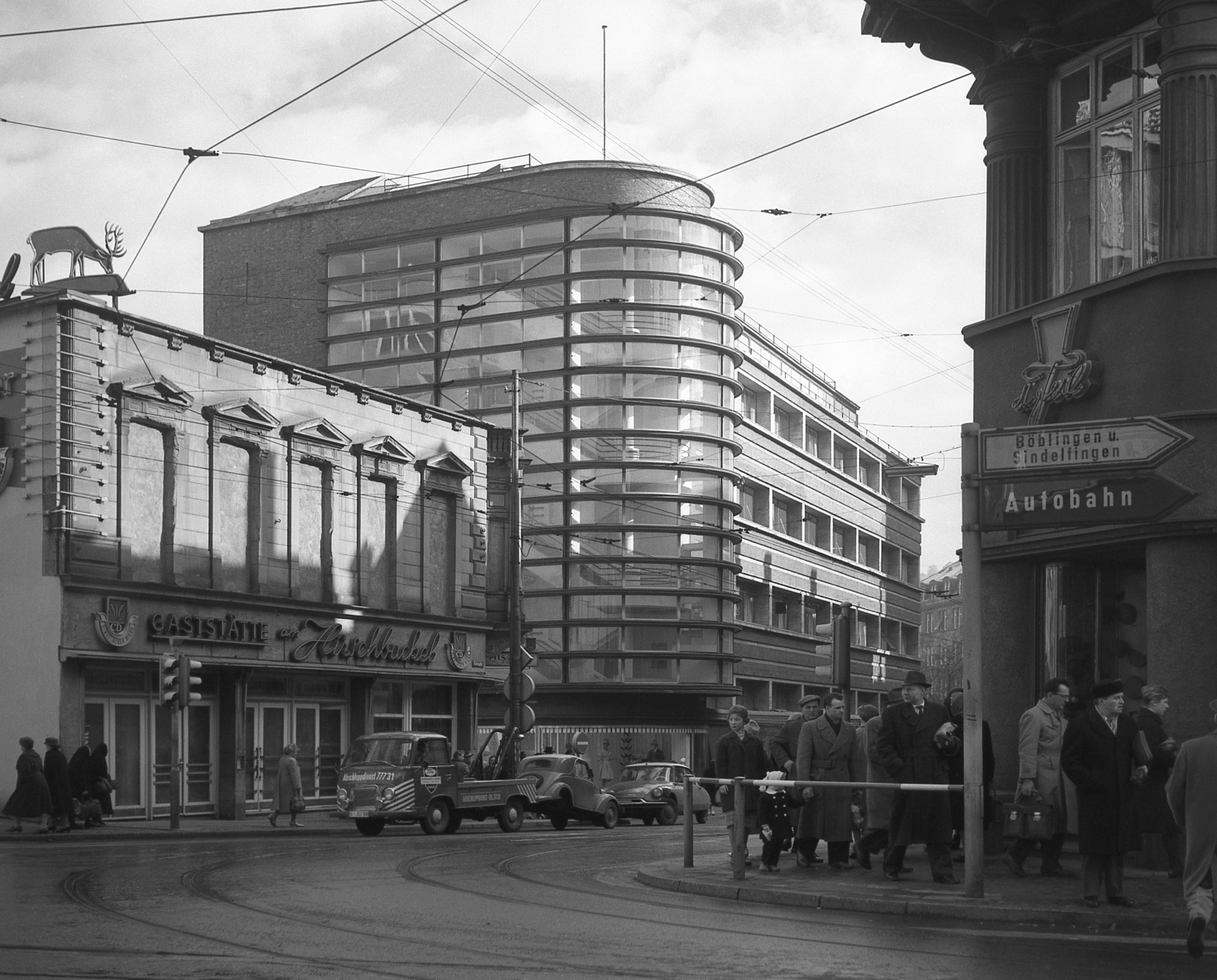
Schocken Department Store Stuttgart c. 1960

Schocken Department Stores (Kaufhaus Schocken) was a chain of department stores in Germany before World War II.

== History ==
The company was founded by Simon Schocken (1874–1929) and Salman Schocken (1877–1959). After Simon had married into the owner family of Warenhaus Ury Gebrüder in Leipzig, the two brothers enlarged the business to a chain by establishing a second department store in Zwickau. In 1930, the company (named I. Schocken Sons since 1907) had become the fourth largest department store company in Germany with 20 stores. After the death of Simon Schocken in a car crash in 1929, his brother was sole owner.

The most famous stores are the ones in Nuremberg (Aufseßplatz) (built 1925/26, demolished), Stuttgart (→ Schocken Stuttgart, 1926–28, demolished 1960) and Chemnitz (1927–30) designed by architect Erich Mendelsohn. All three can be seen as milestones in modern architecture.

After the rise of Nazism, Salman Schocken was forced to sell his department stores to the Merkur AG (so-called "Aryanisation"). After the war, Schocken sold his regained share of the company (51%) to Helmut Horten GmbH, which later became part of Kaufhof and is currently owned by Metro.

In 1931, Salman Schocken founded his own publishing house (later Schocken Books) which published books in German and Hebrew. It later moved to Mandatory Palestine and the United States. The Schocken family lives in Israel and the United States. Schocken Books is now affiliated with Random House Publishing. The family still owns 60% of the Israeli newspaper Haaretz once owned by Salman Schocken.
