= Gideon Schocken =

- גדעון שוקן
- Gideon Shocken, January 5, 1959
- Born: December 28, 1919; Weimar Republic
- Died: November 24, 1981 (aged 61); Israel
- Spouse: Deborah Schocken
- Military career
- Allegiance: United Kingdom; Israel
- Branch: British Army; Haganah; Israel Defense Forces
- Service years: 1936–1961
- Rank: Aluf
- Commands: Major in the British Army, World War II; Deputy Head of the Manpower Directorate, February 1949 – 1954; Head of staff of the Operations Directorate in 1953 - 1955; Head of the Manpower Directorate, February 1956 – April 1961
- Conflicts: World War II; 1948 Arab–Israeli War
- Other work: Manager of Schocken Books Publishing in New York; Commissioner of the Israeli security forces; Member of the Board of directors of Bank Leumi
- Father: Salman Schocken
- Relatives: Gershom Schocken (brother); Amos Schocken (nephew)

Gideon Schocken (also spelled Shocken; Hebrew: גדעון שוקן; December 28, 1919 – November 24, 1981) was a German-born Haganah fighter, major in the British Army during World War II, and aluf (major general) in the Israel Defense Forces (IDF). He served as the head of the Manpower Directorate from February 1956 to April 1961.

== Biography ==
Gideon Schocken was born to Zerline "Lilli" (née Ehrmann) and Salman Schocken, the co-founder of Schocken Books, an established publishing company in Germany. He immigrated to Israel with his family in 1934, graduating from Gymnasia Rehavia the following year. In 1936, Schocken joined the Haganah, and in 1943 he passed the platoon commanders' course.

Schocken studied at Hebrew University and Oxford University. During World War II, he volunteered for the British Army and served in the Jewish Brigade after its establishment. He served in North Africa and Italy. In 1946, he was discharged from the British Army as a major. Following the war, he went to the United States to help his father move their publishing business to New York.

By 1949, Schocken had returned to Israel, joining the IDF, where he was appointed the deputy head of the Manpower Directorate. He served as the head of staff of the Operations Directorate from 1953 until 1955, when he joined the Emergency Management division of the Office of the Prime Minister. On February 15, 1956, Schocken was appointed head of Manpower Directorate of the General Staff of the Israel Defense Forces with the rank of aluf mishne. He received the rank of aluf in May 1959.

Schocken retired at the end of his term in April 1961. After his military service, Schocken became the commissioner of the Israeli security forces under the office of the State Comptroller of Israel. He also became a member on the board of directors of Bank Leumi.

Schocken was an avid collector of modern and naïve art and photography. Among other things, he designed the first book covers of Franz Kafka's English publications.

Schocken died in 1981. His wife, Deborah Schocken is curator of art and founder of the Herzliya Museum of Contemporary Art. Schocken had two daughters: Yael Miron and Tamar Schocken. Schocken's son, Shimon Schocken, is a professor of computer science at the Interdisciplinary Center Herzliya.
