= Haaretz =

Israeli daily newspaper

- Type: Daily newspaper
- Format: Berliner
- Owner(s): Schocken family (75%); Leonid Nevzlin (25%)
- Publisher: Amos Schocken
- Editor: Aluf Benn
- Founded: 1919; 107 years ago
- Political alignment: Centre-left to left-wing Liberalism; Progressivism
- Language: Hebrew, English
- Headquarters: Global HQ: Tel Aviv, Israel; North American HQ: New York City
- Circulation: 72,000 (weekends: 100,000)
- OCLC number: 635016457
- Website: haaretz.co.il (in Hebrew); haaretz.com

Front page of Ḥadshot Ha'aretz, August 1919

Haaretz (Hebrew: הָאָרֶץ, lit. 'The Land [of Israel]'; originally Ḥadshot Haaretz – Hebrew: חַדְשׁוֹת הָאָרֶץ, IPA: [χadˈʃot haˈʔaʁets], lit. 'News of the Land [of Israel]') is an Israeli daily newspaper. It was founded in 1918, making it the longest running newspaper currently in print in Israel. The paper is published in Hebrew and English in the Berliner format, and is also available online. In North America, it is published as a weekly newspaper, combining articles from the Friday edition with a roundup from the rest of the week. Haaretz is Israel's newspaper of record. It is known for its left-wing and liberal stances on domestic and foreign issues.

As of 2022, Haaretz has the third-largest circulation in Israel. It is widely read by international observers, especially in its English edition, and discussed in the international press. According to the Center for Research Libraries, among Israel's daily newspapers, "Haaretz is considered the most influential and respected for both its news coverage and its commentary."

== History and ownership ==
Haaretz was first published in 1918 as a newspaper sponsored by the British military government in Palestine. In 1919, it was taken over by a group of socialist-oriented Zionists, mainly from Russia. The newspaper was established on 18 June 1919 by a group of businessmen including the philanthropist Isaac Leib Goldberg, initially called Hadashot Ha'aretz ("News of the Land"). Later, the name was shortened to Haaretz. The literary section of the paper attracted leading Hebrew writers of the time.

The newspaper was initially published in Jerusalem. From 1919 to 1922, the paper was headed by a succession of editors, among them Leib Yaffe. It was closed briefly due to a budgetary shortfall and reopened in Tel Aviv at the beginning of 1923 under the editorship of Moshe Glickson, who held the post for 15 years. The Tel Aviv municipality granted the paper financial support by paying in advance for future advertisements.

Throughout the 1920s and 1930s, Haaretz's liberal viewpoint was to some degree associated with the General Zionist "A" faction, which later helped form the Progressive Party, though it was nonpartisan and careful not to espouse any specific party line. It was considered the most sophisticated of the Yishuv's dailies.

Salman Schocken, a Jewish businessman who left Germany in 1934 after the Nazis had come to power, bought the paper in December 1935. Schocken was active in Brit Shalom, also known as the Jewish–Palestinian Peace Alliance, a body supporting co-existence between Jews and Arabs which was sympathetic to a homeland for both peoples. His son, Gershom Schocken, became the chief editor in 1939 and held that position until his death in 1990.

The Schocken family were the sole owners of the Haaretz Group until August 2006, when they sold a 25% stake to German publisher M. DuMont Schauberg. The deal was negotiated with the help of the former Israeli ambassador to Germany, Avi Primor. This deal was seen as controversial in Israel as DuMont Schauberg's father, Kurt Neven DuMont, was a member of the Nazi Party and his publishing house promoted Nazi ideology.

On 12 June 2011, it was announced that Russian-Israeli businessman Leonid Nevzlin had purchased a 20% stake in the Haaretz Group, buying 15% from the family and 5% from M. DuMont Schauberg. In December 2019, members of the Schocken family bought all of the Haaretz stock belonging to M. DuMont Schauberg. The deal saw the Schocken family reach 75% ownership, with the remaining 25% owned by Leonid Nevzlin.

In October 2012, a union strike mobilized to protest planned layoffs by the Haaretz management, causing a one-day interruption of Haaretz and its TheMarker business supplement. According to Israel Radio, it was the first time since 1965 that a newspaper did not go to press on account of a strike.

On 24 November 2024, the Israeli government ordered a boycott of Haaretz by government officials and anyone working for a government-funded body, and banned government advertising with the newspaper. According to The Guardian, Haaretz "had published a series of investigations of wrongdoing or abuses by senior officials and the armed forces, and has long been in the crosshairs of the current government." The sanctions against Haaretz were condemned by the Committee to Protect Journalists and by Anton Harber and Irwin Manoim, the founders and editors of the South African newspaper Weekly Mail. They stated in a letter to the editor of Haaretz, "The Netanyahu government's sanctions against Ha'aretz have brought back vivid memories of our own newspaper's struggle against the apartheid government about four decades ago."

== Management ==
The newspaper's editorial policy was defined by Gershom Schocken, who was editor-in-chief from 1939 to 1990. Schocken was succeeded as editor-in-chief by Hanoch Marmari. In 2004 David Landau replaced Marmari and was succeeded by Dov Alfon in 2008. The current editor-in-chief of the newspaper is Aluf Benn, who replaced Alfon in August 2011. Charlotte Halle became editor of the English print edition in February 2008.

Walter Gross was a member of the governing editorial board and a columnist with the paper from 1951 to 1995.

== Editorial policy and viewpoints ==
Haaretz describes itself as having "a broadly liberal outlook both on domestic issues and on international affairs", and has been summarized as being "liberal on security, civil rights and economy, supportive of the Supreme Court, very critical of Netanyahu's government". Others describe it alternatively as liberal, centre-left, left-wing, and the country's only major left-leaning newspaper. The paper opposes continuing the Israeli occupation of the Palestinian territories and consistently supports peace initiatives. The Haaretz editorial line is supportive of weaker elements in Israeli society, such as sex workers, foreign laborers, Israeli Arabs, Ethiopian immigrants, and Russian immigrants.

=== International media views ===
In 2006, the BBC said that Haaretz takes a moderate stance on foreign policy and security. David Remnick in The New Yorker described Haaretz as "easily the most liberal newspaper in Israel", its ideology as left-wing and its temper as "insistently oppositional". According to Ira Sharkansky, Haaretz's op-ed pages are open to a variety of opinions. J. J. Goldberg, the editor of the American The Jewish Daily Forward, describes Haaretz as "Israel's most vehemently anti-settlement daily paper". Stephen Glain of The Nation described Haaretz as "Israel's liberal beacon", citing its editorials voicing opposition to the occupation, the discriminatory treatment of Arab citizens, and the mindset that led to the Second Lebanon War. A 2003 study in The International Journal of Press/Politics concluded that Haaretz's reporting of the Israeli–Palestinian conflict was more favorable to Israelis than to Palestinians but less so than that of The New York Times. In 2016, Jeffrey Goldberg, the editor-in-chief of The Atlantic, wrote: "I like a lot of the people at Haaretz, and many of its positions, but the cartoonish anti-Israelism and anti-Semitism can be grating."

=== Position on Palestinian statehood ===
The paper strongly advocated a two-state solution in July 2025, at a high point of the Gaza–Israel conflict. Its editorial welcomed and endorsed the proposal by French President Emmanuel Macron to include France by September 2025 in the number of countries which recognise a Palestinian state.

== Formatting, circulation, and reputation ==
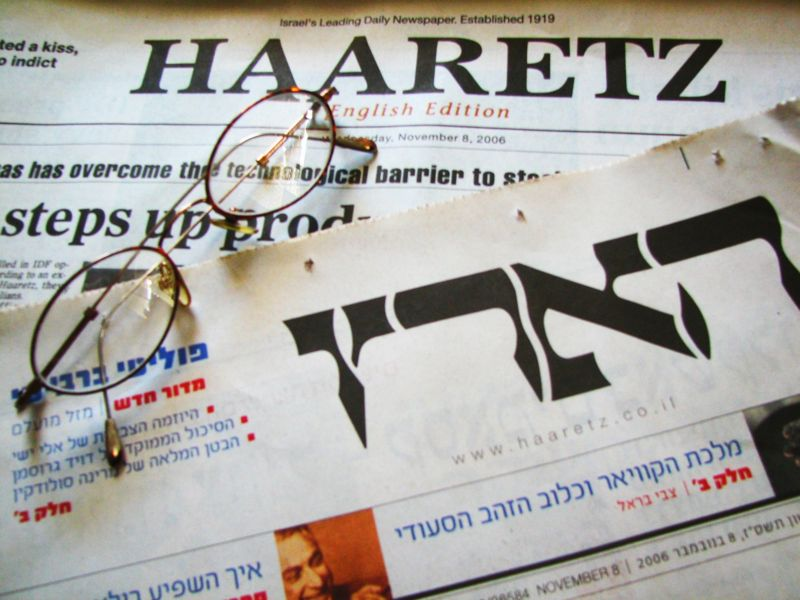
Front page of the Hebrew and English editions

=== Circulation ===
In 2022, a TGI survey found that Haaretz was the newspaper with the third largest readership in Israel, with an exposure rate of 4.7%, below Israel Hayom's rate of 31% and Yedioth Ahronoth's 23.9%.

=== Formatting and image ===
Haaretz uses smaller headlines and print than other mass circulation papers in Israel. Less space is devoted to pictures, and more to political analysis. Opinion columns are generally written by regular commentators rather than guest writers. Its editorial pages are considered influential among government leaders. Apart from the news, Haaretz publishes feature articles on social and environmental issues, as well as book reviews, investigative reporting, and political commentary. In 2008, the newspaper itself reported a paid subscribership of 65,000, daily sales of 72,000 copies, and 100,000 on weekends. The English edition has a subscriber base of 15,000.

=== Readership and reception ===
Despite its historically relatively low circulation in Israel, Haaretz has for many years been described as Israel's most influential daily newspaper. In 2006, it exposed a scandal regarding professional and ethical standards at Israeli hospitals. Its readership includes members of Israel's intelligentsia and members of its political and economic elites. In 1999, surveys showed that Haaretz readership had above-average education, income, and wealth, and that most were Ashkenazi Jews. Some have said that Haaretz functions in Israel much as The New York Times does in the United States, as a newspaper of record. In 2007, Shmuel Rosner, Haaretz's former U.S. correspondent, told The Nation, "people who read it are better educated and more sophisticated than most, but the rest of the country doesn't know it exists." According to Hanoch Marmari, a former Haaretz editor, the newspaper has lost its political influence in Israel because it became "detached" from the country's political life.

Andrea Levin, executive director of the pro-Israel Committee for Accuracy in Middle East Reporting in America (CAMERA), said Haaretz was doing "damage to the truth" and sometimes making serious factual errors without correcting them. According to The Jerusalem Post, Haaretz editor-in-chief David Landau said at the 2007 Limmud conference in Moscow that he had told his staff not to report on criminal investigations against Prime Minister Ariel Sharon in order to promote Sharon's 2004–2005 Gaza disengagement plan. In April 2017, Haaretz published an op-ed by a staff writer that said the Israeli religious right was worse than Hezbollah. Condemnation followed, including from Prime Minister Benjamin Netanyahu, President Reuven Rivlin, and other government ministers and MPs, as well as from Opposition Leader Isaac Herzog.

On 31 October 2024, Haaretz's publisher Amos Schocken made remarks during a speech at a Haaretz conference in London, criticising the Netanyahu government for allegedly imposing an apartheid regime on the Palestinian population and referring to "Palestinian freedom fighters that Israel calls terrorists." In response, the Israeli interior, education, diaspora ministries severed ties with Haaretz while the Communications Minister Shlomo Karhi advocated a boycott of the newspaper covering all government bodies and employees. Schocken distanced himself from parts of comments the next day, saying that "the use of terrorism is not legitimate". By 4 November, the newspaper had received hundreds of cancellation and subscription termination requests, and a decline in advertising revenue. Several ministries had requested to cancel their subscriptions, with the Israeli foreign ministry cancelling 90 subscriptions.

== Internet editions ==
Haaretz operates both Hebrew and English language websites. The two sites offer up-to-the-minute breaking news, live Q&A sessions with newsmakers from Israel, the Palestinian territories and elsewhere, and blogs covering a range of political standpoints and opinions. The two sites fall under the supervision of Lior Kodner, the head of digital media for the Haaretz Group. Individually, Simon Spungin is the editor of Haaretz.com (English) and Avi Scharf is the editor of Haaretz.co.il (Hebrew).

== Offices ==
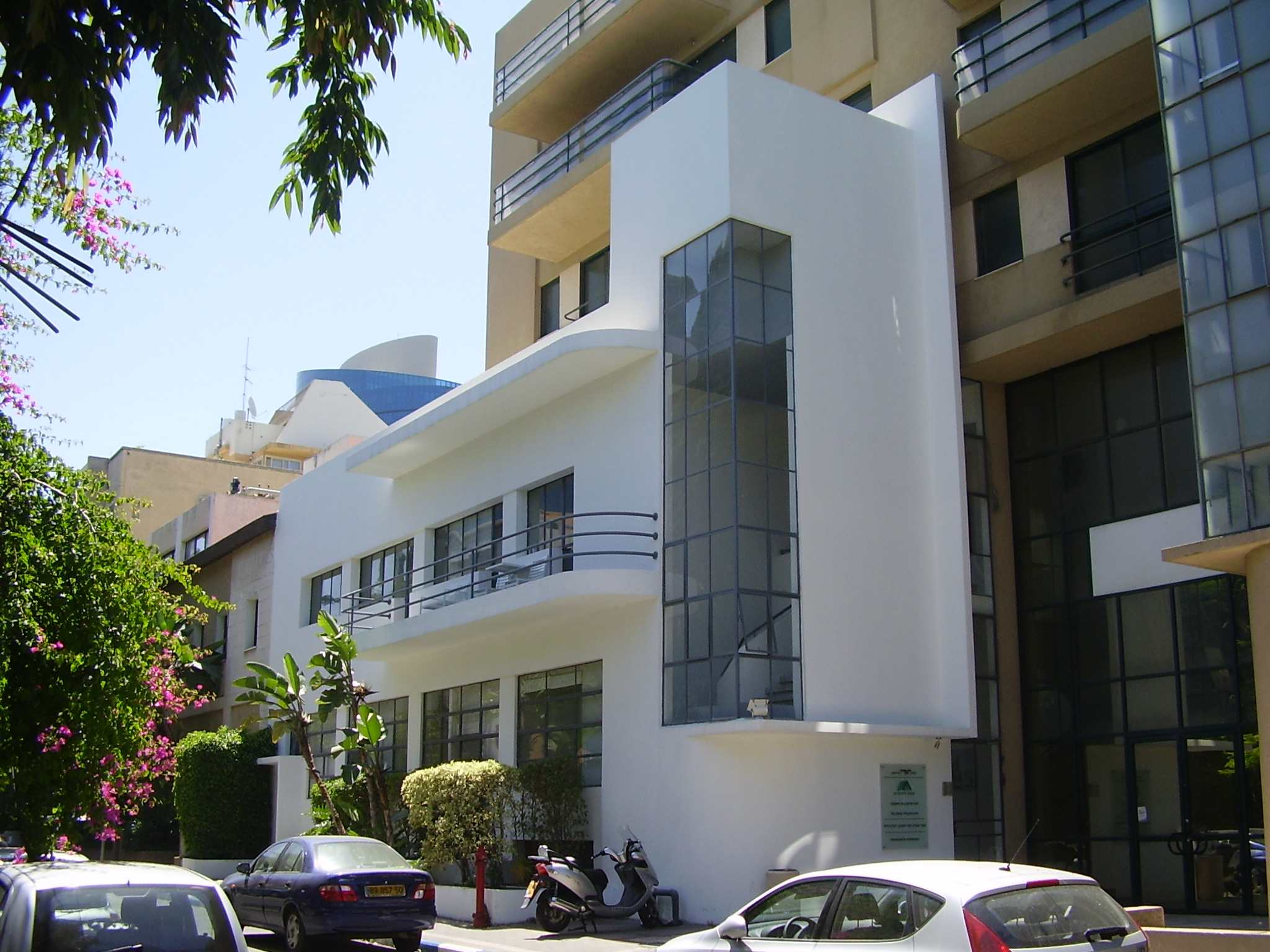
Former Haaretz building (1932–1973), of which only part of the facade has been preserved

The Haaretz building is on Schocken Street in south Tel Aviv.

The former Haaretz building of 1932–1973 was designed by architect Joseph Berlin. It was demolished in the early 1990s, with only part of the facade preserved and integrated into the new building at 56, Maza Street.

On 8 July 2026, the Haaretz office in Tel Aviv was vandalized after an unknown masked individual smashed the entrance door using bricks before fleeing the scene. In response to the incident, Haaretz released a statement that it will take steps to increase security to protect employees and will "continue to fulfill its professional and public mission of free and independent journalism" as well as "not surrender to these violent attempts of intimidation and silencing." Haaretz later reported the incident to the police. Prior to the attack, a similar incident occurred on 5 July when a Channel 12 studio was vandalized after a masked person damaged the glass entrance door with a stone.

== Journalists and writers ==
=== Present ===
- Ruth Almog – literature, publicist
- Merav Arlosoroff – economy affairs columnist (in The Marker)
- Avraham Balaban – Tel Aviv and cultural history publicist
- Zvi Barel – Middle East affair commentator
- Omer Benjakob - technology, disinformation, Wikipedia
- Aluf Benn – editor-in-chief
- Bradley Burston – political columnist
- Saggi Cohen – food columnist
- Lily Galili
- Doram Gaunt – food columnist
- Avirama Golan
- Ehud Barak
- Ehud Olmert
- Zehava Galon
- Amos Harel – military correspondent
- Israel Harel – columnist
- Danna Harman – feature writer
- Amira Hass – Ramallah-based Palestinian affairs correspondent.
- Avi Issacharoff – military correspondent
- Uri Klein – film critic
- Yitzhak Laor – publicist
- Alex Levac – photo columnist
- Gideon Levy – Palestinian affairs columnist
- Amir Mandel – classic music critic
- Amir Oren – military affairs
- Sammy Peretz – economic affairs columnist (in The Marker)
- Anshel Pfeffer – political and military affairs
- Tsafrir Rinat – environmental issues
- Guy Rolnick – economic affairs editorialist (of The Marker)
- Doron Rosenblum – satirist, publicist
- Ruth Schuster, Senior Editor for archaeology and science at the Haaretz English Edition.
- Tom Segev – historian, political commentator
- Ben Shalev – popular music critic
- Nehemia Shtrasler – economic affairs, publicist
- Simon Spungin – Managing Editor, English Edition
- Gadi Taub – political commentary
- Amir Tibon
- Yossi Verter – political reporter
- Esther Zandberg – architecture
- Benny Ziffer – literature, publicist

=== Past ===
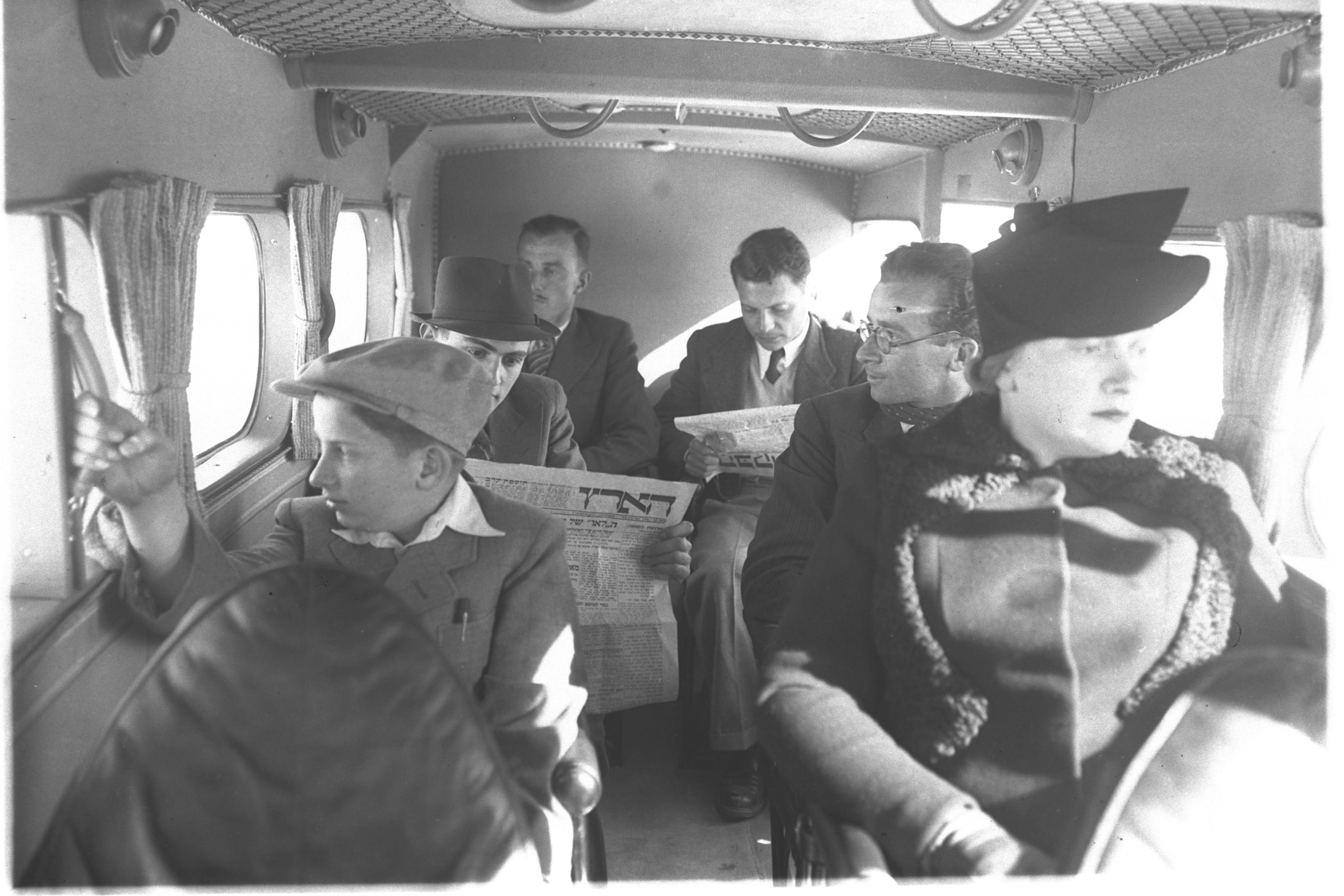
Passengers on board a Palestine Airways Short Scion, 1939. The second passenger on the left is reading Haaretz.

- Nathan Alterman (1910–1970)
- Moshe Arens – columnist
- Ehud Asheri
- Gidi Avivi – popular music critic
- Meron Benvenisti (1934–2020) – political columnist
- Noam Ben Ze'ev – music critic
- Yoram Bronowski (1948–2001) – literary critic, TV critic
- Arie Caspi
- Daniel Dagan
- Akiva Eldar – diplomatic affairs analyst
- Amos Elon (1926–2009) – correspondent, editor, writer
- Boaz Evron
- Michael Handelzalts – theater critic, columnist
- Sayed Kashua – satiric columnist, author
- Jerrold Kessel
- Yair Kotler
- Tami Litani
- Aviva Lori
- Yoel Marcus – political commentator, publicist
- Yossi Melman – former intelligence correspondent
- Natasha Mozgovaya – former U.S. correspondent
- Ran Reznick – health issues
- Daniel Rogov – food and wine critic
- Danny Rubinstein – former Arab affairs analyst
- Gideon Samet – political commentator
- Yossi Sarid (1940–2015) – politician, publicist
- Ze'ev Schiff – military and defense analyst
- Daniel Ben Simon
- Ruth Sinai – social welfare and humanitarian issues
- Ze'ev Segal – law
- Ari Shavit – political columnist
- Yair Sheleg – Jewish religious affairs
- Nadav Shragai
- Ze'ev Sternhell – political commentary
- Benjamin Tammuz (1919–1989) - literary critic, writer, editor of the literary supplement
- Pavel Wolberg – photographer
- Merav Michaeli

== See also ==
- Culture of Israel
- Economy of Israel
- List of newspapers in Israel
