= Salman Schocken =

Jewish publisher and entrepreneur (1877-1959)

- שלמה זלמן שוקן
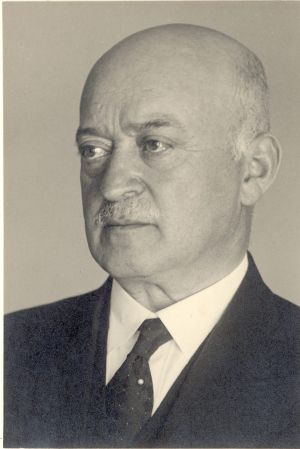
- Born: October 30, 1877; Margonin, Posen, German Empire
- Died: August 6, 1959 (aged 81); Pontresina, Switzerland
- Resting place: Israel
- Occupations: Publisher, businessman
- Known for: Kaufhaus Schocken; Haaretz; Schocken Books
- Spouse: Zerline Ehrmann (m. 1910)
- Children: 5, including Gershom and Gideon
- Relatives: Amos Schocken (grandson)

Salman Schocken (German: [ˈzalman ˈʃɔkn̩]; October 30, 1877 – August 6, 1959) or Shlomo Zalman Schocken (Hebrew: שלמה זלמן שוקן) was a German Jewish publisher, and co-founder of the large Kaufhaus Schocken chain of department stores in Germany. Stripped of his citizenship and forced to sell his company by the German government, he immigrated to Mandatory Palestine in 1934, where he purchased the newspaper Haaretz (which is still majority-owned by his descendants).

== Biography ==
=== Germany ===
Salman Schocken ("S" in Salman pronounced "Z") was born on October 30, 1877, in Margonin, Posen, German Empire (today Poland), the son of a Jewish shopkeeper. In 1901, he moved to Zwickau, a German town in southwest Saxony, to help manage a department store owned by his brother, Simon. Together they built up the business and established a chain of Kaufhaus Schocken stores throughout Germany. Schocken commissioned German Jewish architect Erich Mendelsohn to design Modernist style buildings. He opened branches in Nuremberg (1926), Stuttgart (1928) and Chemnitz (1930, the only one to survive). By 1930 the Schocken chain was one of the largest in Europe, with 20 stores. After his brother Simon's death in 1929, when his friend Franz Rosenzweig also died, Salman Schocken became sole owner of the chain.

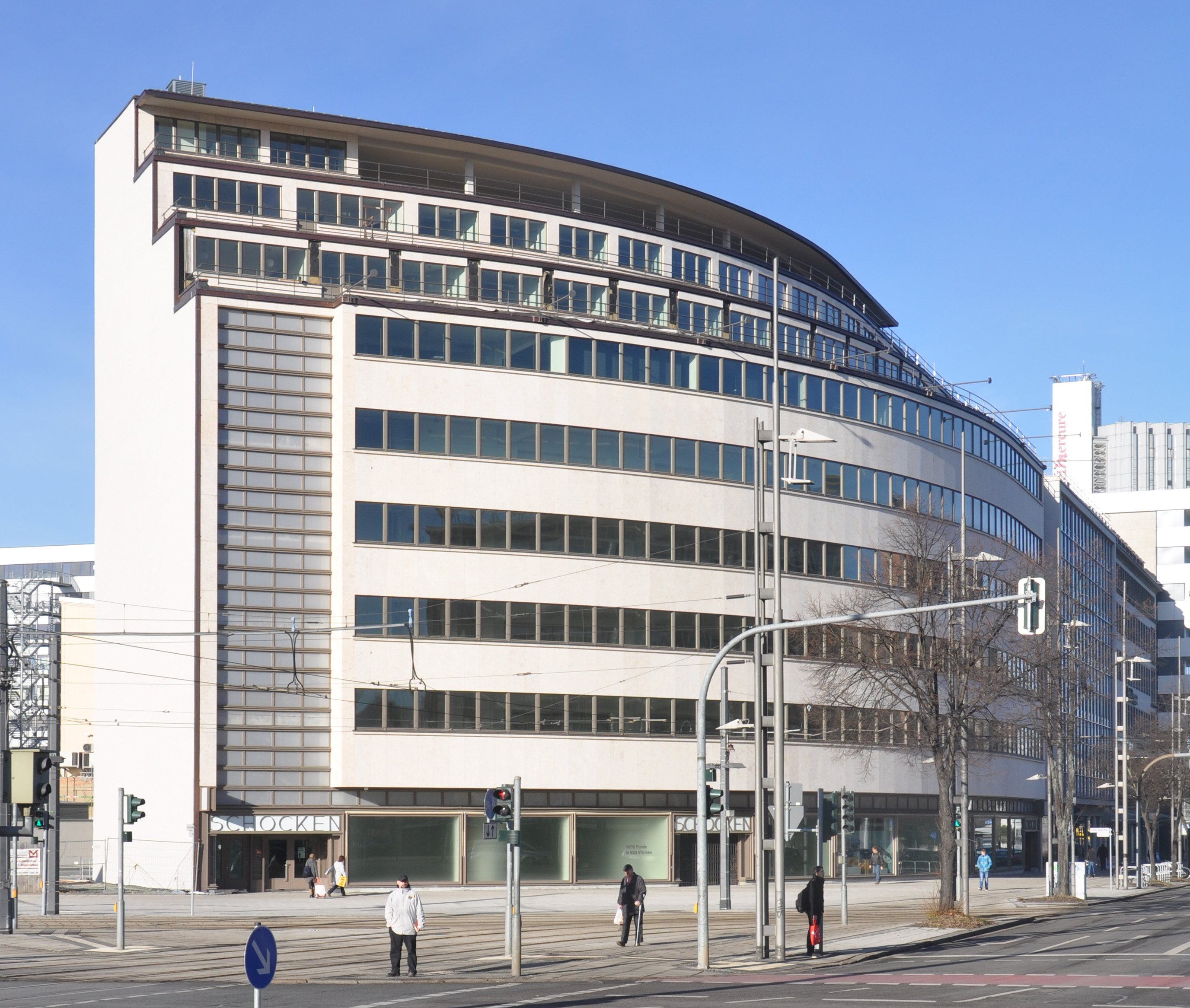
State Museum of Archaeology Chemnitz in the former Schocken department store

In 1915, Schocken co-founded the Zionist journal Der Jude (with Martin Buber). Schocken would support Buber financially, as well as other Jewish writers such as Gerschom Scholem and S.Y. Agnon. In 1930 he established the Schocken Institute for Research on Hebrew Poetry in Berlin, a research center intended to discover and publish manuscripts of medieval Jewish poetry. The inspiration for this project was his longstanding dream of finding a Jewish equivalent for the foundational literature of Germany, such as the German epic poem The Nibelungenlied.

In 1931, he founded the publishing firm Schocken Verlag (English, "Schocken Publishers"), which printed books by German Jewish writers such as Franz Kafka and Walter Benjamin, making their work widely available. The firm also reprinted the Buber-Rosenzweig translation of the Bible and issued the Bücherei des Schocken Verlags (English, "Library of the Schocken Verlag") and the Jüdische Lesehefte (English, "Jewish readers") book series. These initiatives earned him the nickname "the mystical merchant" from his friend Scholem.

In 1933, the Nazis stripped Schocken of his German citizenship. They forced him to sell his German enterprises to Merkur AG, but he managed to recover some of his property after World War II.

=== British Mandate of Palestine ===
In 1934 Schocken left Germany for the Holy Land. In Jerusalem, he built the Schocken Library, also designed by Erich Mendelsohn. He became a board member of the Hebrew University of Jerusalem, and bought the newspaper Haaretz for 23,000 pounds sterling in 1935. His eldest son, Gershom Schocken, became the chief editor in 1939 and held that position until his death in 1990. The Schocken family today has a 75% share of the newspaper. Salman Schocken also founded the Schocken Publishing House Ltd. and, in New York in 1945 with the aid of Hannah Arendt and Nahum Glatzer, opened another branch, Schocken Books. In 1987 Schocken Books became an imprint of the Knopf Doubleday Publishing Group at Random House, owned by widely diversified media corporation Bertelsmann since 1998.

Schocken became a board member of the Jewish National Fund and helped with the purchase of land in the Haifa Bay area.

Schocken became the patron of Shmuel Yosef Agnon during his years in Germany. Recognizing Agnon's literary talent, Schocken paid him a stipend that relieved him of financial worries and allowed him to devote himself to writing. Agnon went on to win the Nobel Prize in Literature in 1966.

=== United States ===
In 1940, Schocken left Palestine with his family except for one son (Gershom), and settled in the United States, where he founded Schocken Books.

Schocken died of heart failure on August 6, 1959, while vacationing at an Alpine resort in Pontresina, Switzerland. He was buried in Israel.

== Family ==
In 1910 Salman Schocken married Zerline "Lilli" Ehrmann, a twenty-year-old German Jewish woman from Frankfurt. They had four sons and one daughter. Their eldest son, Gustav Gershom Schocken, succeeded his father at the Schocken publishing house in Tel Aviv and at the Haaretz newspaper. Another son, Gideon Schocken, became a Haganah fighter and later a general and the head of the Manpower Directorate of the Israel Defense Forces.

== Villa Schocken in Jerusalem ==
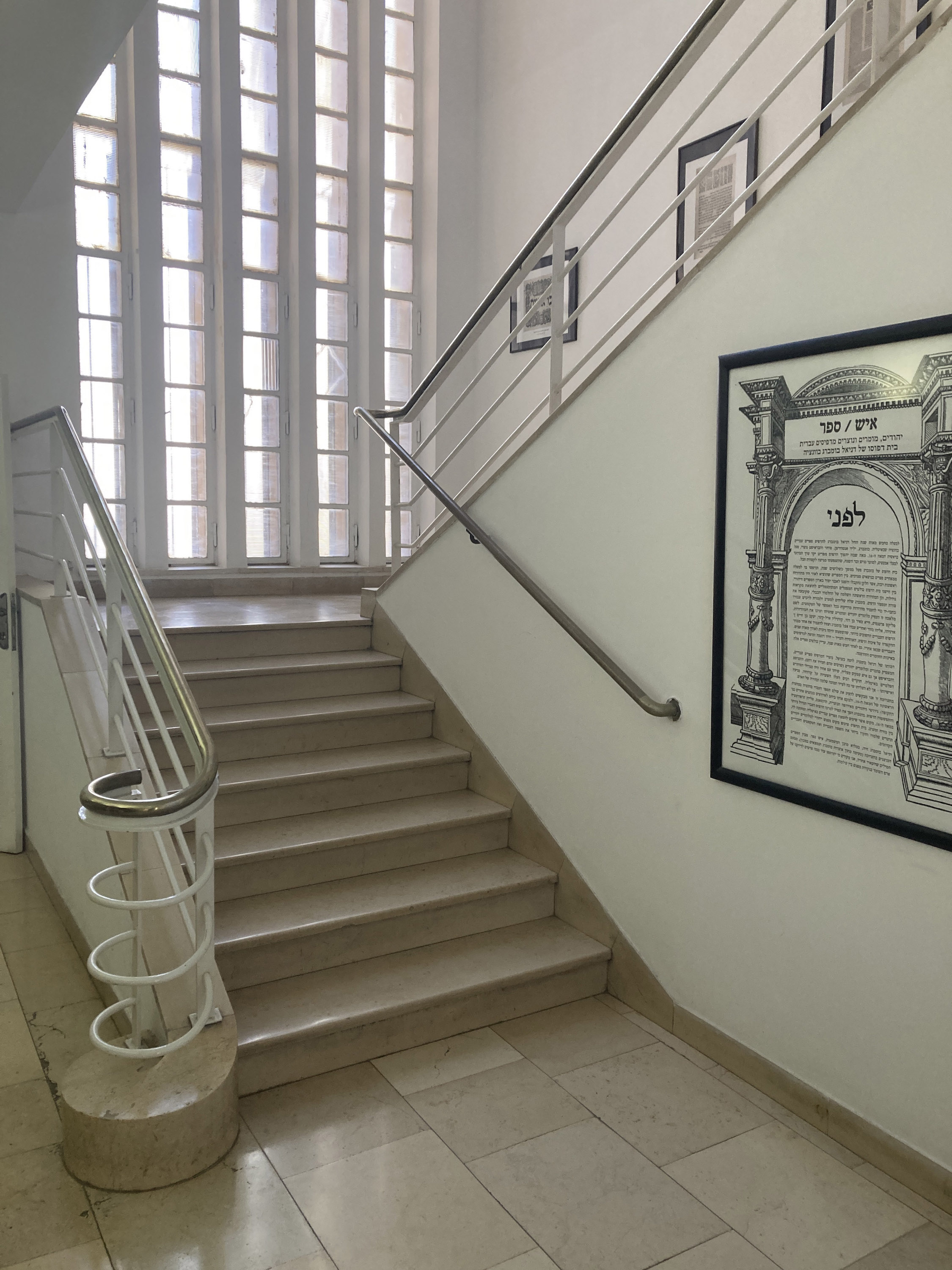
Staircase at the Schocken Library

The home of Salman Schocken at what is now 7 Smolenskin Street is in the Rehavia neighborhood of Jerusalem. It was designed by Erich Mendelsohn. The building, constructed of Jerusalem stone between 1934 and 1936, was originally surrounded by a spacious 1.5-acre (6,100 m^{2}) garden. During the British Mandate the building was taken over by the British and used as the residence of General Evelyn Barker. In 1957, the property was sold to the Jerusalem Academy of Music and Dance which invited another architect, Joseph Klarvin, to design an additional front wing of classrooms facing the street. Klarvin also added a third story, dispensing with the pergolas and blocking over the oval pool in the courtyard.

Schocken also had a library built in Jerusalem for his significant book collection. The building was also designed by Erich Mendelsohn and was built at what is now 6 Balfour Street, close to his home. Today the historic building is home to the Schocken Institute for Jewish Research of the Jewish Theological Seminary of America. The Institute houses the Salman Schocken Library and other important archives and collections of Jewish and other books.

== Reparations ==
On June 12, 2014, a court in Berlin awarded 50 million euros to Salman Schocken's surviving heirs in Israel as part of reparations for the seizure of Schocken AG by the Nazi regime in 1938.

== See also ==
- List of German Jews
