= Gershom Schocken =

Israeli journalist and politician

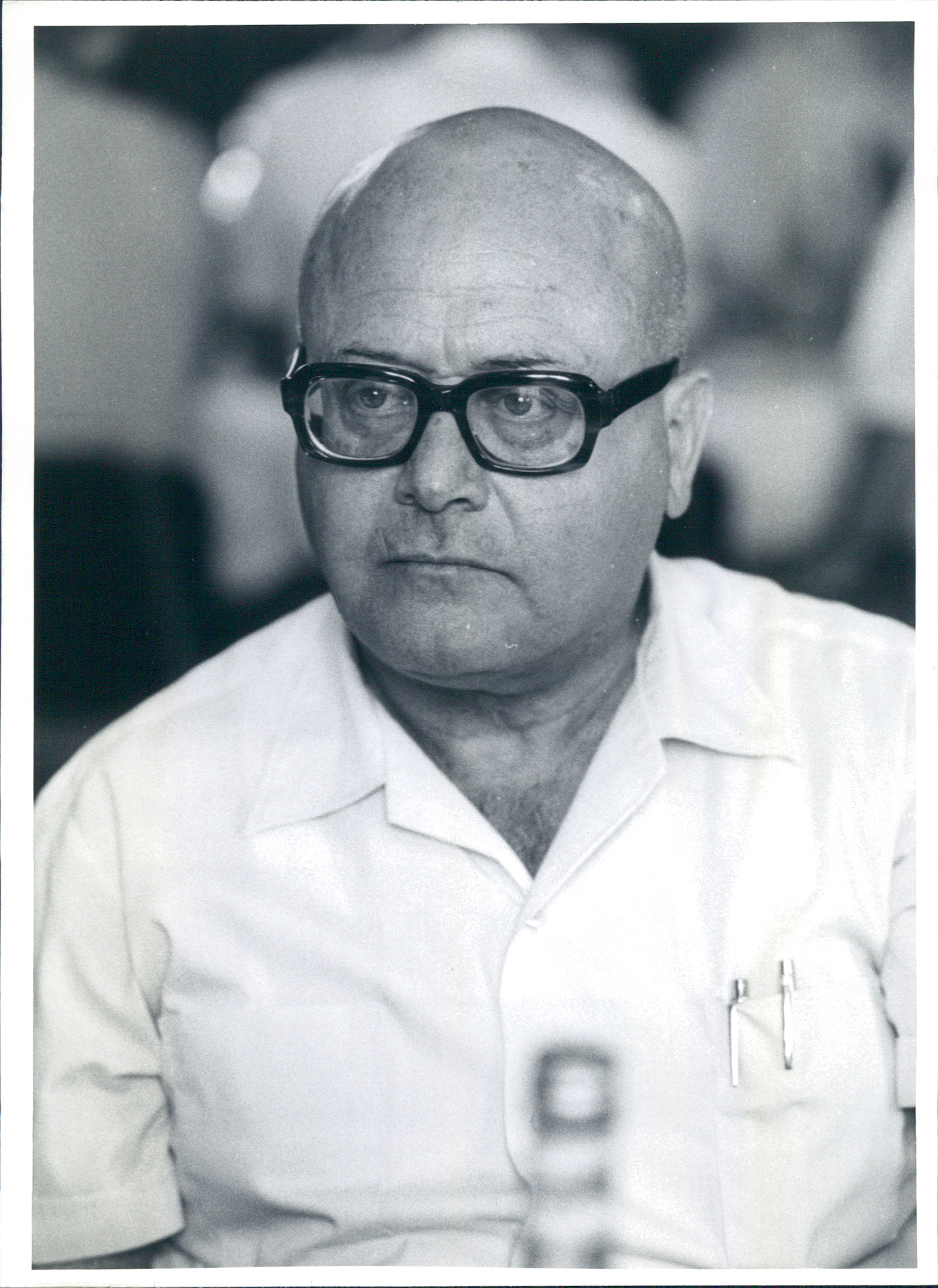
- Schocken in the 1950s

Faction represented in the Knesset
- 1955–1959: Progressive Party

Personal details
- Born: 29 September 1912 Zwickau, German Empire
- Died: 20 December 1990 (aged 78) Tel Aviv, Israel

Gershom Gustav Schocken (Hebrew: גרשום גוסטב שוקן; 29 September 1912 – 20 December 1990) was an Israeli journalist and politician who was editor of Haaretz for more than 50 years and a member of the Knesset for the Progressive Party between 1955 and 1959.

== Biography ==
Gustav "Gershom" Schocken was born in Zwickau, Germany, to Zerline "Lilli" (née Ehrmann) and Salman Schocken, a retailer. He studied at the University of Heidelberg and the London School of Economics. While in Heidelberg, he befriended fellow student Walter Gross, whom he would later work with for decades at Haaretz. Following Adolf Hitler's rise to power, he emigrated to Mandatory Palestine in 1933 one year before the rest of his family, and started working at Anglo-Palestine Bank, where he remained until 1936. Schocken was married to Shulamit Persitz, daughter of General Zionists MK Shoshana Persitz, and had three children, Amos (the current publisher of Haaretz), Hillel (an architect) and Racheli Edelman.

In 1939 he became editor of the Haaretz newspaper, which had been bought by his father Salman two years earlier. He remained editor of the paper until his death in 1990. In 1950 he was amongst the founders of the ITIM news agency. Schocken also published poetry in German, English and Hebrew under the penname Robert Pozen, as well as publishing a book, Poems for Times of Celebration in 1969. In 1983 he was named International Editor of the Year Award by the World Press Review for Haaretz's "excellence in coverage of Israel's invasion of Lebanon in 1982". He often signed his articles using the pseudonym "Ben-Dam," literally "Son of Blood."

In 1955 he was elected to the Knesset on the Progressive Party list, and served on the House Committee, the Economic Affairs Committee and the Labor Committee. He quit politics and lost his seat in the 1959 elections.

He died of liver cancer at the Sheba Medical Center in Tel Aviv on 20 December 1990 at the age of 78. He was buried in Nahalat Yitzhak Cemetery.
