= Natasha Mozgovaya =

American-Israeli journalist

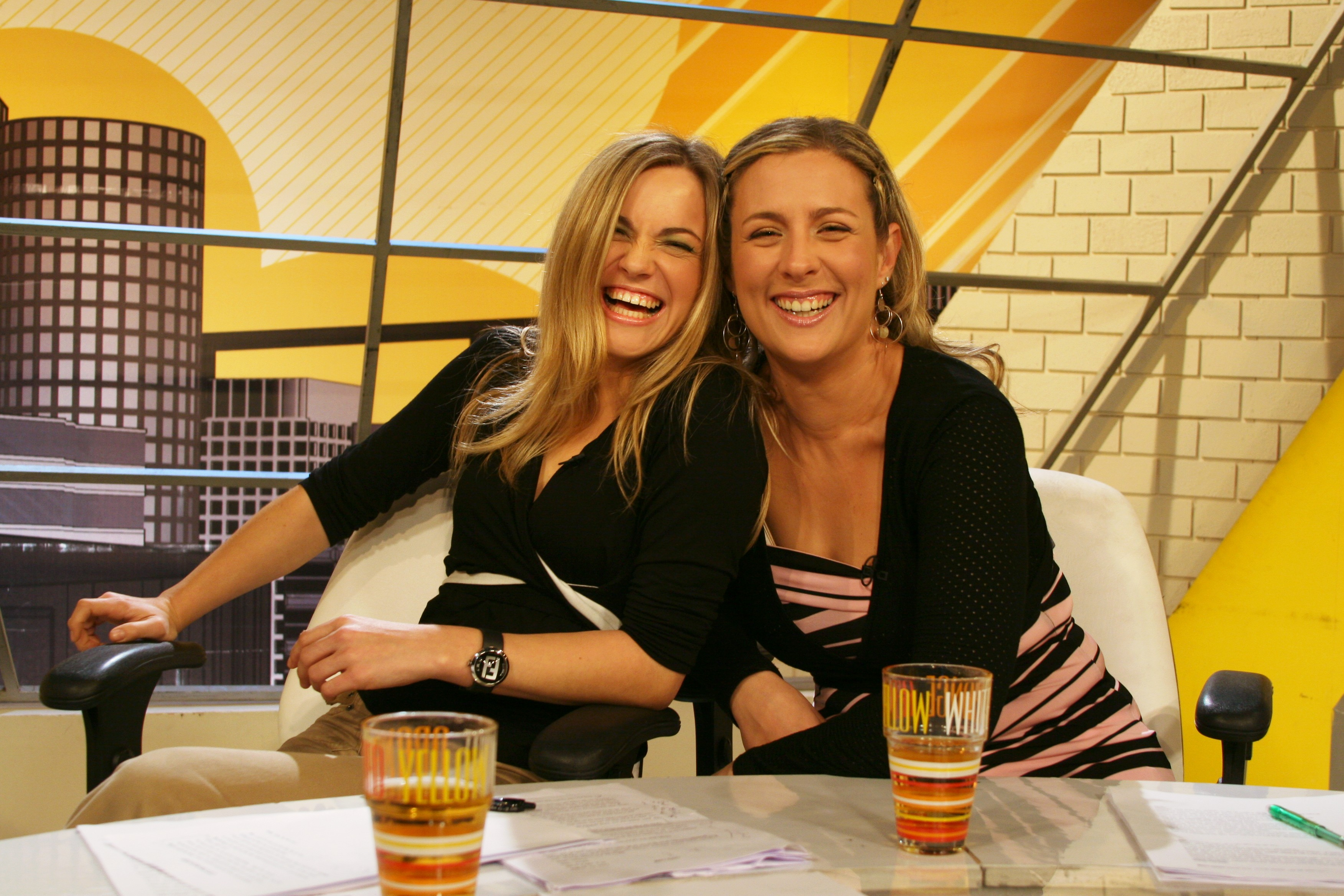
- Natasha Mozgovaya (left) with Daphna Shpigelman
- Born: 1979 (age 46–47); Soviet Union
- Other names: Hebrew: נטשה מוזגוביה; Russian: Наташа Мозговая
- Education: Tel Aviv University
- Occupations: Journalist & TV host
- Children: 3

Natasha Mozgovaya (Hebrew: נטשה מוזגוביה, Russian: Наташа Мозговая; born 1979) is an American-Israeli journalist. She is a former TV host for Voice of America.

== Biography ==
Natasha Mozgovaya was born in the Soviet Union in 1979 to two journalist parents, and immigrated to Israel in 1990. At the age of 11, she published her first piece in a Russian-language newspaper. At 14, she was writing a weekly satiric column for the Russian-Israeli newspaper Vesti. In time she advanced to become editor for two supplement magazines at the newspaper and translated several books from Russian to Hebrew. At the age of 12, she won her screen-debut, taking part in advertisements for the Jewish Agency.

Mozgovaya has a bachelor's degree in sociology and anthropology and a master's degree in political science from Tel Aviv University , and an MBA from Illinois Institute of Technology.

In 2000, Mozgovaya left Vesti and became a correspondent for Yediot Ahronoth newspaper, covering a broad spectrum of issues in Israel and all over the world. During the presidency of Vladimir Putin, Mozgovaya contributed extensive coverage of the Russian opposition. Meanwhile, she anchored the investigative report TV program "Special Department" on Channel 9, the cultural shows "Osim Ruach" on Channel 1 and Ha-boker ha-Shvii on Channel 2.

From October 2007 she presented the nightly newscast on Channel 9 and starred in the documentary series Tmol Shilshom, that engages in the history of Israel from 1948, each part dedicated to a different year in history of the country. Although working most of the time in Hebrew, her reports in Russian from the Palestinian territories and Israel were published in various magazines and newspapers in Russia, and one of her blogs was chosen twice as "the best blog" in Russian blogosphere and the "Best Journalistic Blog in Russian" by Deutsche Welle in 2004.

In 2008, Mozgovaya left Yedioth Ahronoth to become the Washington Bureau Chief for Haaretz newspaper in Washington, D.C. She was a frequent lecturer on Israel and Middle Eastern affairs in various U.S. universities, communities and think-tanks. She left Haaretz in 2012.

In 2013, Mozgovaya started working at the Voice of America, hosting the daily Current time TV show. In 2015, she developed and started hosting Briefing, a daily web TV show. In 2016, she became Digital Managing Editor, overseeing the development of original digital media projects, including multi-platform special-event productions, internet television shows, podcasts, and the cultural series America. The Big Road Trip, which she also partially hosted.

In 2020, she assumed the role of Project Manager, leading the development and launch of VOA+ over-the-top (OTT) streaming applications and managing VOA podcast operations.

After relocating to Seattle, she added coverage of topics related to the Pacific Northwest.

== Personal life ==
She lives with her family in Seattle, Washington.
