= His Alienated Wife =

Novel by Eda Zoritte

- Author: Eda Zoritte
- Original title: אשתו המנודה
- Cover artist: Lena Zaidel
- Language: Hebrew
- Genre: Historical fiction
- Publisher: Keter Publishing House
- Publication date: 1997
- Publication place: Israel
- Media type: Print
- ISBN: 9650707115

His Alienated Wife (orig. title in Hebrew: אשתו המנודה), is a 1997 novel by Israeli author Eda Zoritte.

The book is a novel about Theodor Herzl's wife, Julie Naschauer-Herzl. In it, Zoritte suggests a fictitious alternative to the official Zionist depicting of Julie as a cherished figure of the Zionist movement, in which she and her two children were smuggled by activists of the World Zionist Organization to the United States, where she was committed to a sanatorium in order not to taint the official national myth and official Zionist history with her frustrations and capricious outbursts.

The book is written in two parts. Part I, "The New World", consists of confessional pages, written by Julie and placed in safekeeping with a young journalist who documents her meetings with the great leader's wife. Part II, ״The Diaries, 1922–1925", is the diaries written by Julie until the end of her residence in the sanatorium.

His Alientated Wife is one of three books by Zoritte in which she chose to give a voice to the forgotten women of the Zionist movement. The other two books are Life Long Love, a novel on the tragic love of the painter Ira Jan to Hayim Nahman Bialik and The Maiden and the Poet, about Nathan Alterman's lover, the painter Zila Binder.
