= Eda Zoritte =

Israeli writer, playwright, translator and poet (born 1926)

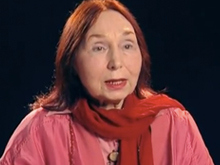
- Native name: אידה צורית
- Born: 9 February 1926 (age 100) Tel Aviv, Mandatory Palestine
- Occupation: Writer, essayist, playwright, poet, translator
- Language: Hebrew
- Spouse: Aharon Megged
- Children: Eyal Megged, Amos Megged

Eda Zoritte Megged (Hebrew: אידה צורית מגד; born 9 February 1926) is an Israeli writer, essayist, playwright, translator and poet.

== Biography ==
Zoritte was born in Tel Aviv in 1926. She graduated from the Levinsky Seminar for Teachers in Jaffa, studied dance and theater in the United States and appeared there in productions of the Hebrew theater "Pargod", directed by Peter Frye.

After returning to Israel, Zoritte began publishing essays about literature and art, in the literary supplement "Masa" (He: ״משא״, the literature supplement of LaMerhav newspaper), in other newspapers and in books. Among her publications are an essay on the poetry of Nathan Alterman, a partial biography of Amir Gilboa, a biography of Avoth Yeshurun and studies of his works. She also published historical novels, including about Theodor Herzl's wife, Hayim Nahman Bialik's wife and Nathan Alterman's lover, the painter Zila Binder. In addition, she published novels, short stories and a poetry book, The Shadow of Time.

Zoritte is writer Aharon Megged's widow. She has two children.

=== Performed plays ===
- "Last Game" was directed by Robert Rietti and performed in Purcell Room in London in 1970.
- "The Crystal Ball" was performed by the Karov Theatre in 2010.

=== Prizes ===
- 1981, 2000 – Prime Minister's Award
- 1990 – Dov Sadan Foundation Award

== Works ==
=== Fiction and poetry ===
- Ariadne's Thread (dialogue), Aleph, 1964 [Chut Ariadna]
- Somber Blossoming (novel), Hakibbutz Hameuchad, 1969 [Pricha Afela]
- Happy Years (novel), Sifriat Poalim, 1975 [Ha-Gil Ha-Meushar]
- The Roman Way (stories), Massada [Ba-Derech Ha-Roma'it]
- Astray (novel), Am Oved, 1984 [Iir Ha-Nidachat]
- His Alienated Wife (novel), Keter, 1997 [Ishto Ha-Menuda] – a novel about Theodor Herzl's wife
- Life Long Love (novel), Keter, 2000 [Ahavat Chayim] – a novel on the tragic love of the painter Ira Jan for Hayim Nahman Bialik
- The Maiden and the Poet, Yedioth Ahronoth, 2004 [Ha-Alma Ve-Ha-Meshorer] – about Nathan Alterman's lover, the painter Zila Binder
- The Thirty-Seventh Step (stories), Carmel, 2007 [Ha-Madrega Ha-Shloshim Ve-Sheva]
- Aurelia: Book of Visions and Prayers (novel), Nahar Sfarim, 2012 [Aurelia: Sefer Ha-Chezyonot Ve-Ha-Tfilot]
- The Shadow of Time (poetry), Olam Hadash, 2014 [Tzel Ha-Zman]

=== Non fiction ===
- Two Plays of Love, Eked, 1963 [Shnei Machazot Al Ahava]
- The Sacrifice and the Covenant (monograph), 1973 [Ha-Korban Ve-Ha-Brit] – studies of the poetry of Nathan Alterman
- Spheres of Life and Emanation (literary essays), Hakibbutz Hameuchad, 1988 [Ha-Chayim, Ha-Atzilut]
- The Song of the Noble Savage: A Biography of the Poet Avot Yeshurun, Hakibbutz Hameuchad/ Siman Kriah, Sifriat Zagagy, 1995 [Shirat Ha-Pere Ha-Atzil: Biographya Shel Ha-Meshorer Avot Yeshurun]

=== Translations ===
- "The Dragon", a play performed by the Cameri Theater in 1964.
- "The Ice Palace" ("Is-slottet") by Tarjei Vesaas.
