= On the Slaughter =

- by Hayim Nahman Bialik
- Publication date: 1903

"On the Slaughter" (Hebrew: על השחיטה, Al HaShchita) is a Hebrew poem written by Haim Nahman Bialik in 1903, in response to the Kishinev Pogrom. The poem is one of the literary reactions to the massacre of Jews in Kishinev, expressing deep despair and anger over the violence and the lack of justice.

Heaven, beg mercy for me! If there is
a God in you, a pathway through
you to this God - which I have not
discovered - then pray for me! For my
heart is dead, no longer is there prayer
on my lips; all strength is gone, and
hope is no more. Until when, how
much longer, until when?

You, executioner! Here's my neck - go
to it, slaughter me! Behead me like a
dog, yours is the almighty arm and the
axe, and the whole earth is my scaffold
- and we, we are the few! My blood is
fair game - strike the skull, and
murder's blood, the blood of nurslings
and old men, will spurt onto your
clothes and will never, never be wiped
off.

And if there is justice - let it show
itself at once! But if justice show itself
after I have been blotted out from
beneath the skies - let its throne be
hurled down forever! Let heaven rot
with eternal evil! And you, the arrogant,
go in this violence of yours, live by
your bloodshed and be cleansed by it.

And cursed be the man who says:
Avenge! No such revenge - revenge for
the blood of a little child - has yet been
devised by Satan. Let the blood pierce
through the abyss! Let the blood seep
down into the depths of darkness, and
eat away there, in the dark, and breach
all the rotting foundations of the earth.

== History ==
The poem was written in the aftermath of the Kishinev Pogrom (April 1903), one of the brutal anti-Jewish riots in the Russian Empire. The pogrom, instigated by antisemitic propaganda and tolerated by the authorities, resulted in the murder of 49 Jews, the wounding of hundreds, and the destruction of Jewish homes and businesses.

Bialik, who was commissioned to document the atrocities, later wrote "In the City of Slaughter" (Be'Ir HaHaregah), a much longer and more detailed poem condemning the inaction and passivity of Jewish men. "On the Slaughter" is a shorter, more direct expression of grief, horror, and hopelessness.

=== Poetic themes ===
The poem is marked by: A deep sense of despair and anger, Vivid, graphic imagery and Religious and biblical references.

== Publication ==
When the poem was submitted for publication in the literary journal HaShiloah, the Warsaw censor, Nehemiah Zaksh, was hesitant to approve it. The editor of HaShiloah, Joseph Klausner, sent the poem—along with a payment of 25 rubles—for approval by the chief censor in Saint Petersburg, Israel Landa, a former Chabad Hasid who had converted to Christianity in order to obtain residence rights in the city.

The publication of the poem was delayed for two months. Eventually, it was approved for publication, but with alterations: the title "On the Slaughter" (Al HaShchita) and the phrase "My blood is permitted" (Dami mutar) were deemed critical of the Tsarist regime and had to be changed. The poem was published under the title "Heavens, Seek Mercy Upon Me", and the phrase "My blood is permitted" was replaced with "Raise the axe" (Haneif garzen). Bialik was forced to accept these changes reluctantly. However, when his poems were later compiled into a book, the original title and wording were restored.
