= Sefer HaAggadah =

Anthology of Jewish lore

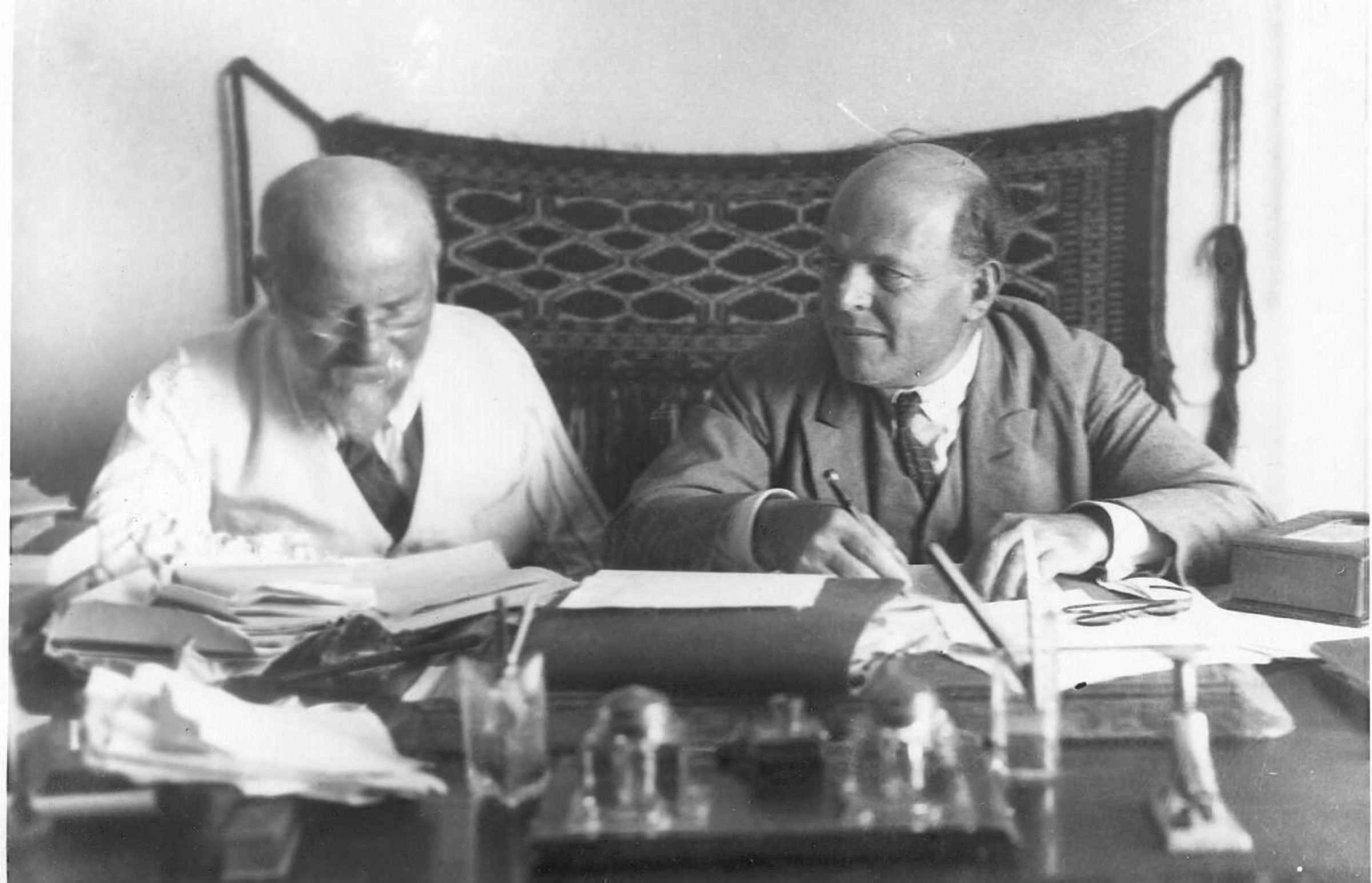
Bialik (right) and Rawnitzki (left)

Sefer HaAggadah (The Book of Legends) is a compilation of Aggadot (singular Aggadah; Aramaic אַגָּדָה: "tales, lore") that was compiled and edited by Hayim Nahman Bialik and Yehoshua Hana Rawnitzki and first published in Odessa in 1908-1911, when Odessa was still a part of the Russian Empire. An English translation was published in 1992; other translations include Yiddish, Russian, and Japanese. Most of the sources included in Sefer HaAggadah come from the period of the Tannaim and the Amoraim. Bialik and Ravnitzky include aggadot from the Mishnah, the Babylonian Talmud, Jerusalem Talmud, Avot of Rabbi Natan, Mekhilta, Sifra, Sifre, Tosefta, Midrash Rabba, Midrash Tanhuma, Pirke De-Rabbi Eliezer, Sefer Yetzirah, Yalkut Shimoni, Alphabet of Sirach and others. Nahum Norbert Glatzer, Jewish literary scholar, theologian, and editor writes that Bialik's goal in compiling the Sefer HaAggadah was "…part of his attempt to popularize Hebrew classics." This mission is very much evident in Bialik's essay, Halakah and Aggadah where he expands on the roles of Halakah and Aggadah in reinventing or renewing a society's culture.

== Halakah and Aggadah ==
In 1917 Hayim Nahman Bialik published an essay titled Halakah and Aggadah where he elaborates on the role of Halakah (torah law) and Aggadah (lore) as two key elements in Judaism that can only work hand in hand. Throughout the essay Bialik shows the dual nature of Halakah and Aggadah and the complementary roles that they play. He writes that, "Halakhah is all husk, body, action; Aggadah is all content, soul, aspiration. The first is hardening inertia, compulsion and submission; the second, continuous renewal, freedom and spontaneity." Although Sefer HaAggadah's goal is to spread the "renewal, freedom and spontaneity" within the rich tradition of Jewish lore, in Halakah and Aggadah Bialik emphasizes the gravity and importance of Halakah. Halakah to Bialik is the implementation of the lessons learned from Aggadah, it is "a defined attitude towards life." When Bialik refers to Halakah he isn't necessarily referring to Torah Law. He may be talking about the implementation of the morals and ethics that people learn from the rich Jewish Aggadic literature. To Bialik the renewal of a Jewish culture was crucial and he believed that it had to be rooted in the past yet refocused for a new modern Hebrew speaking audience. Although the goal of Sefer HaAggadah was to popularize the old Hebrew classics in the form of Aggadah, Bialik's calls for a life of "…action rather than talk, and in writing, for Halakhah rather than Aggadah." In other words, culture does not enter the conscience of a people or a nation if it does not transition into the realm of action.
