= Nahal Hadar =

Seasonal stream in Israel

Coordinates: 32°07′N 34°53′E

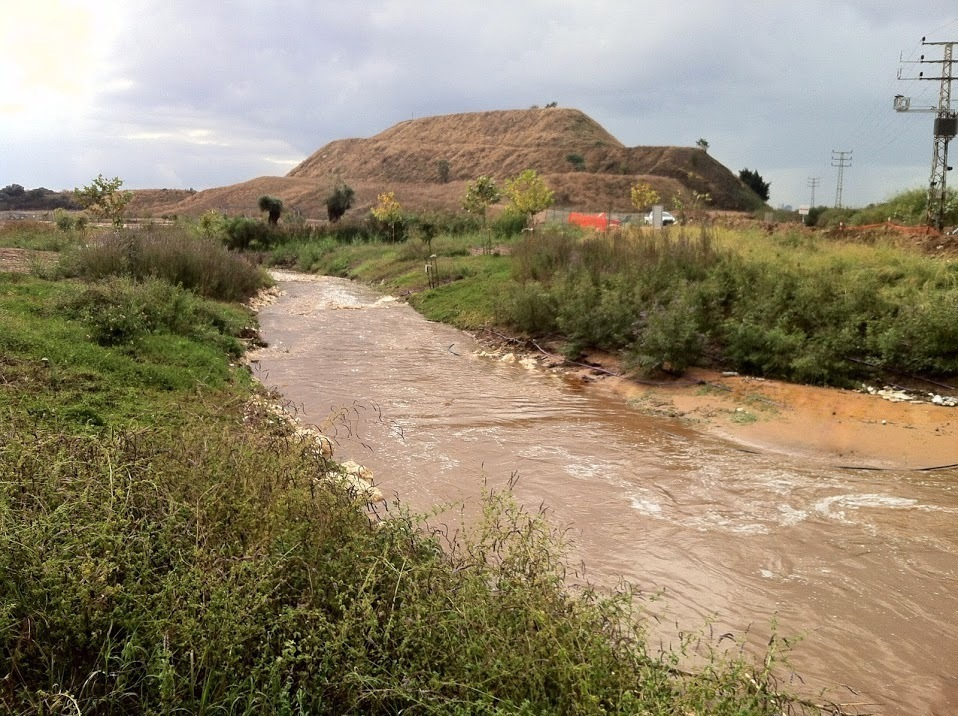
Hadar Stream flowing after autumn rains, with the old landfill in the background, south of Hod HaSharon

Nahal Hadar is a seasonal stream in Israel and one of the tributaries of Yarkon River. The stream originates in the area of Moshav Giv'at Hen south of Ra'anana, mainly in the Hod HaSharon area, and flows into the Yarkon River near Tel Kane opposite the mouth of Nahal Shilo.

== History ==
The name Nahal Hadar ("Citrus Stream") comes from the many orchards that used to surround the area. The stream flows into the Yarkon River opposite the mouth of Nahal Shilo - Bacharya orchard, which was purchased by the people of the Hebrew settlement led by Yitzhak Rokach in 1904.

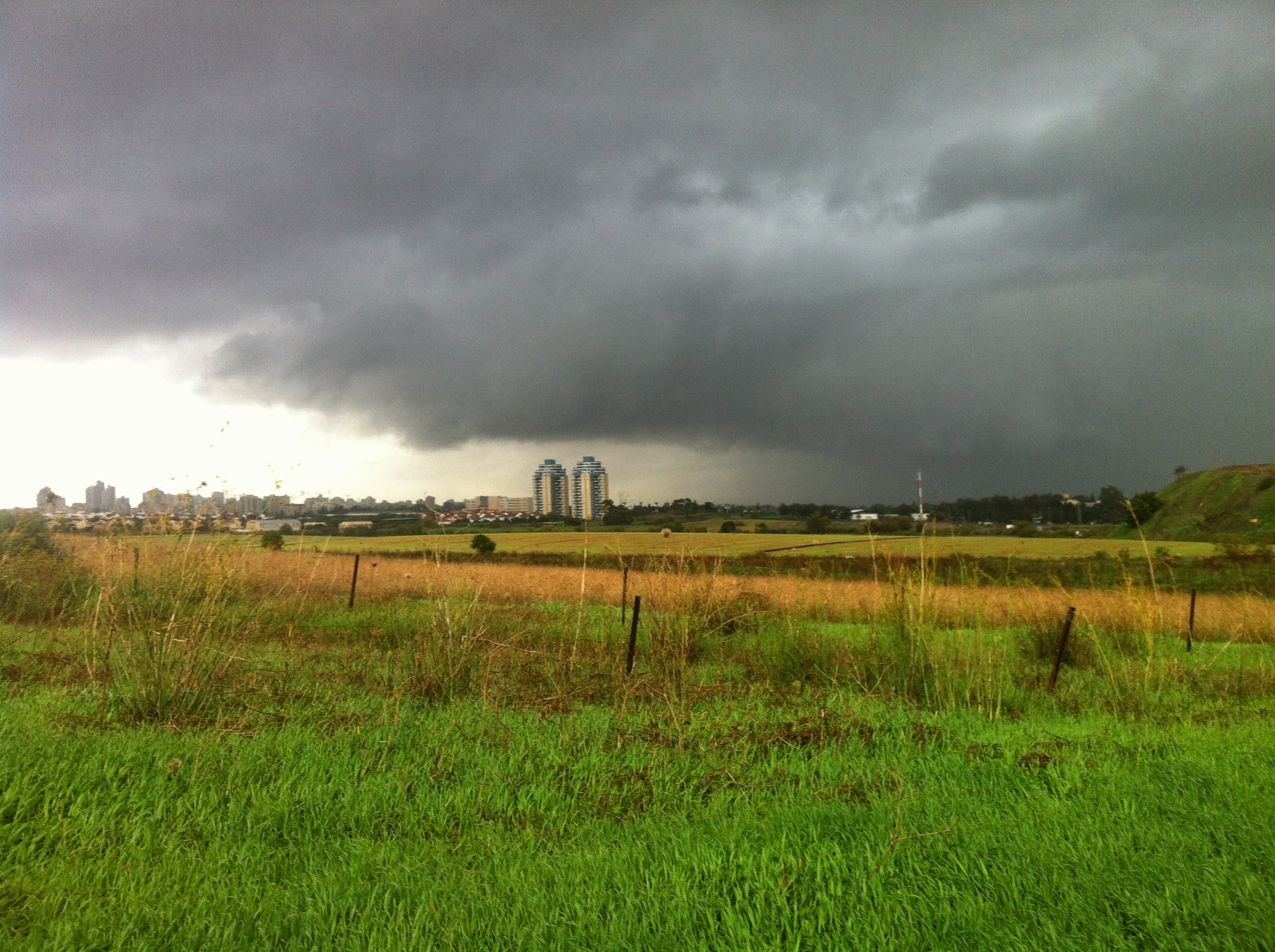
Hod HaSharon and its southern fields on a rainy autumn day near Hadar Stream

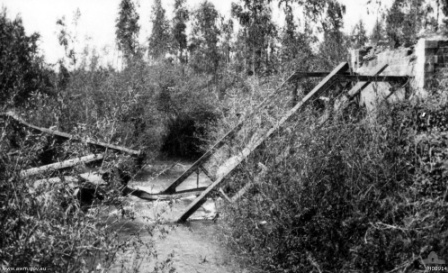
Iron bridge near Prochia station, blown up by the Ottomans as a means of prevention before the Battle of Yarkon Crossings

The stream begins in the area of Giv'at Hen south of Ra'anana and west of Hod HaSharon. In this section, it is just an open drainage channel. The stream crosses Road 4 and continues through the Ganei Tzvi and Hadar areas. Under the Four Seasons Park, the stream is channeled into an underground tunnel, flowing beneath Ramot Hadar with a garden above it. South of Ramot Hadar, the stream emerges from the tunnel and leaves the built-up area of Hod HaSharon, passing through its fields near the landfill. Its lower reaches are where the waters of Kfar Saba and Hod HaSharon are recycled using the "green ponds" method and Tel Kane. The Hod HaSharon municipality plans to make this section flow with water all year round.

The Hod HaSharon municipality plans to flow treated wastewater and water from unused wells into the stream, turning it into a recreational and leisure site.

== See also ==
- Geography of Israel
