= Rehavia Gymnasium =

Gymnasia Rehavia
- הגימנסיה העברית רחביה
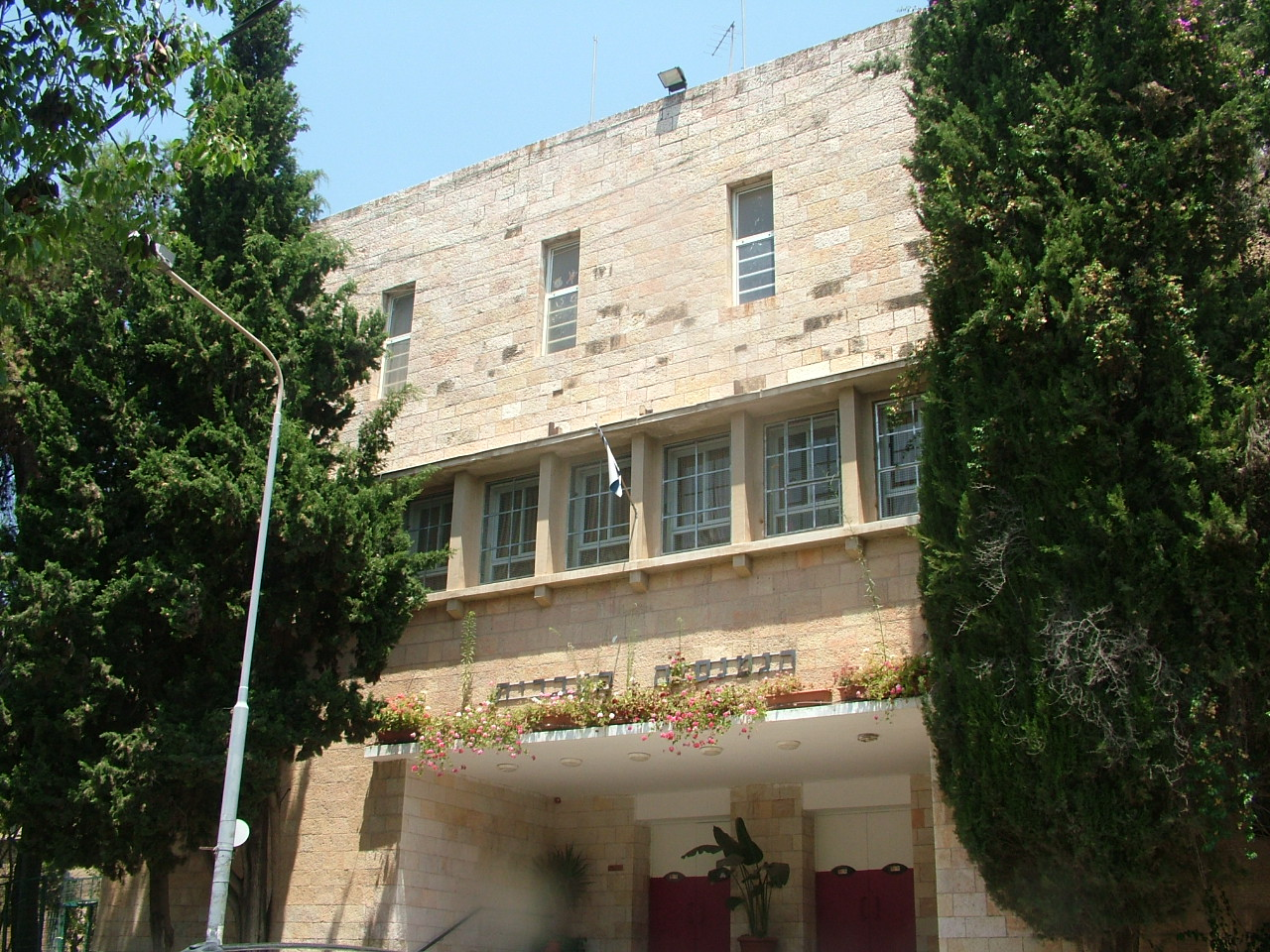

Location
- 14 Keren Kayemet Street, Jerusalem
- 31.776964°N 35.21351°E

Information
- Established: 1909
- Language: Hebrew
- Website: jer-gym.co.il

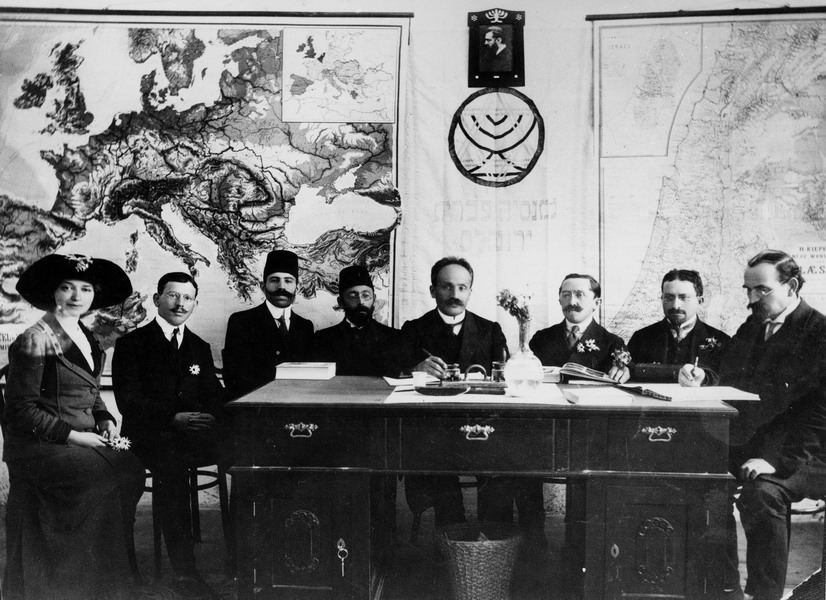
Founders of Gymnasia Rehavia

Rehavia Gymnasium or the Jerusalem Rehavia Gymnasium, by its Hebrew name Gymnasia Rehavia (Hebrew: גמנסיה רחביה, romanized: Gimnazya Rehavya), is a high school in the Rehavia neighborhood in West Jerusalem.

== History ==
The high school's initial name was the Hebrew Gymnasium in Jerusalem.

Gymnasia Rehavia was Jerusalem's first and the country's second modern Jewish high school or gymnasium, after the Herzliya Hebrew Gymnasium in Tel Aviv. The school was first established in Jerusalem's Bukharan Quarter in 1909, by members of the loosely organized group of artists who named themselves "The New Jerusalem", for lack of an appropriate school framework in Jerusalem for their children. The building on Keren Kayemet Street in the Rehavia neighborhood was built in 1928. Among the founders were Dr. Naftali and Hannah Weitz, Yehoshua Barzilay, Yitzhak Ben-Zvi, later the second president of Israel, his wife Rachel Yanait and the artist Ira Jan. The latter three were also among its first teachers.

In July 2009, the high school celebrated its centennial at an event attended by generations of alumni, many of whom are leading figures in Israeli society today.

== Notable alumni ==
- Shmuel Agmon (born 1922), mathematician
- Naomi Ben-Ami (born 1960), government official
- Yitzhak Danziger (1916–77), sculptor
- Trude Dothan (1922–2016), archaeologist specialised in Philistine culture
- Avraham "Avi" Gabbay (born 1967), businessman and politician
- Gil Hovav (born 1962), TV presenter, culinary journalist, restaurant critic, and author
- Ephraim Katzir (1916–2009), biophysicist, politician, 4th President of Israel (1973–1978)
- Dan Meridor (born 1947), politician and government minister
- Sallai Meridor (born 1955), politician and diplomat
- Miriam Naor (born 1947), President of the Supreme Court (2015–2017)
- Uzi Narkiss (1925–1997), IDF general
- Yoni Netanyahu (1946–76), commander of Sayeret Matkal; killed during Operation Entebbe
- Amos Oz (1939–2018), writer, novelist, journalist, and academic
- Reuven Rivlin (born 1939), politician, lawyer, 10th President of Israel (2014–2021)
- Eli Salzberger (born 1960), law professor
- Gideon Schocken (1919–1981), major general, former head of the Manpower Directorate
- Nahman Shai (born 1946), journalist and politician
- Chemi Shalev (born 1953), journalist
- Aaron Valero (1913–2000), Israeli physician and educator
- Matan Vilnai (born 1944), politician and a former Major General
- Yigael Yadin (1917–84), archeologist, politician, and Chief of Staff of the Israel Defense Forces
- A. B. Yehoshua (born 1936), novelist, essayist and playwright
- Rehavam Ze'evi (1926–2001), general and politician
- Israel Dostrovsky (1918–2010), physical chemist, fifth president of the Weizmann Institute of Science
- Avri Gilad an Israeli media personality
- Eliezer Goldberg ( 1931–2022) judge and civil servant who served on the Supreme Court of Israel
- Carmi Gillon (born 1950), politician and a former Israeli ambassador to Denmark and head of Shin Bet
