= In the City of Slaughter =

Poem written by Hayim Nahman Bialik

- by Hayim Nahman Bialik
- Original title: בעיר ההרגה
- Written: 1904
- Language: he

"In the City of Slaughter" (Hebrew: בְּעִיר הַהֲרֵגָה) is a Hebrew poem written in 1904 by Hayim Nahman Bialik about the 1903 Kishinev pogrom. Bialik had previously written the poem "On the Slaughter" in the direct aftermath of the pogrom.

== History ==
The poem was first published under the title "Massa Nemirov" ("The Vision of Nemirov") in the newspaper HaZman, edited by Ben-Tzion Katz, in the city of Petersburg. The change of title and the omission of several lines in the poem were necessary in order to gain the approval of the censor, the converted Jew Landau, for the publication of the poem. The change of the poem's title caused it to sound as if it were written about the pogrom in Nemirov that occurred during Khmelnytsky uprising in the 17th century, thereby disconnecting it from the specific historical context. The poem was translated into Russian by Ze'ev Jabotinsky, thus reaching a wider audience, including the Jewish public that does not read Hebrew.

== Poem ==
Excerpt from the poem "In the City of Slaughter", translated by Vladimir Jabotinsky.

...Get up and walk through the city of the massacre,
And with your hand touch and lock your eyes
On the cooled brain and clots of blood
Dried on tree trunks, rocks, and fences; it is they.
Go to the ruins, to the gaping breaches,
To walls and hearths, shattered as though by thunder:
Concealing the blackness of a naked brick,
A crowbar has embedded itself deeply, like a crushing crowbar,
And those holes are like black wounds,
For which there is no healing or doctor.
Take a step, and your footstep will sink: you have placed your foot in fluff,
Into fragments of utensils, into rags, into shreds of books:
Bit by bit they were amassed through arduous labor—and in a flash,
Everything is destroyed...
And you will come out into the road—
Acacias are blooming and pouring their aroma,
And their blooms are like fluff, and they smell as though of blood.
And their sweet fumes will enter your breast, as though deliberately,
Beckoning you to springtime, and to life, and to health;
And the dear little sun warms and, teasing your grief,
Splinters of broken glass burn with a diamond fire—
God sent everything at once, everyone feasted together:
The sun, and the spring, and the red massacre!

.

== Impact ==
Max Dimont wrote that "Bialik's poem caused thousands of Jewish youths to cast off their pacifism and join the Russian underground to fight Czar and tyranny." Steven Zipperstein wrote that the poem is considered "the most influential" if not "the finest" "Jewish poem written since medieval times." Avner Holtzman believes that no other poem by Bialik made such an impression on his readers, whats "making it possibly the most important poem he ever composed".

Michael Gluzman conducts a psychological analysis of the poem and shows how Bialik's past trauma erupted when he interviewed one of the rape victims in the pogrom, Rivka Schiff. This experience led him to write the harsh lines against Jewish men in his poem.
