= Aharon Megged =

Israeli author and playwright (1920–2016)

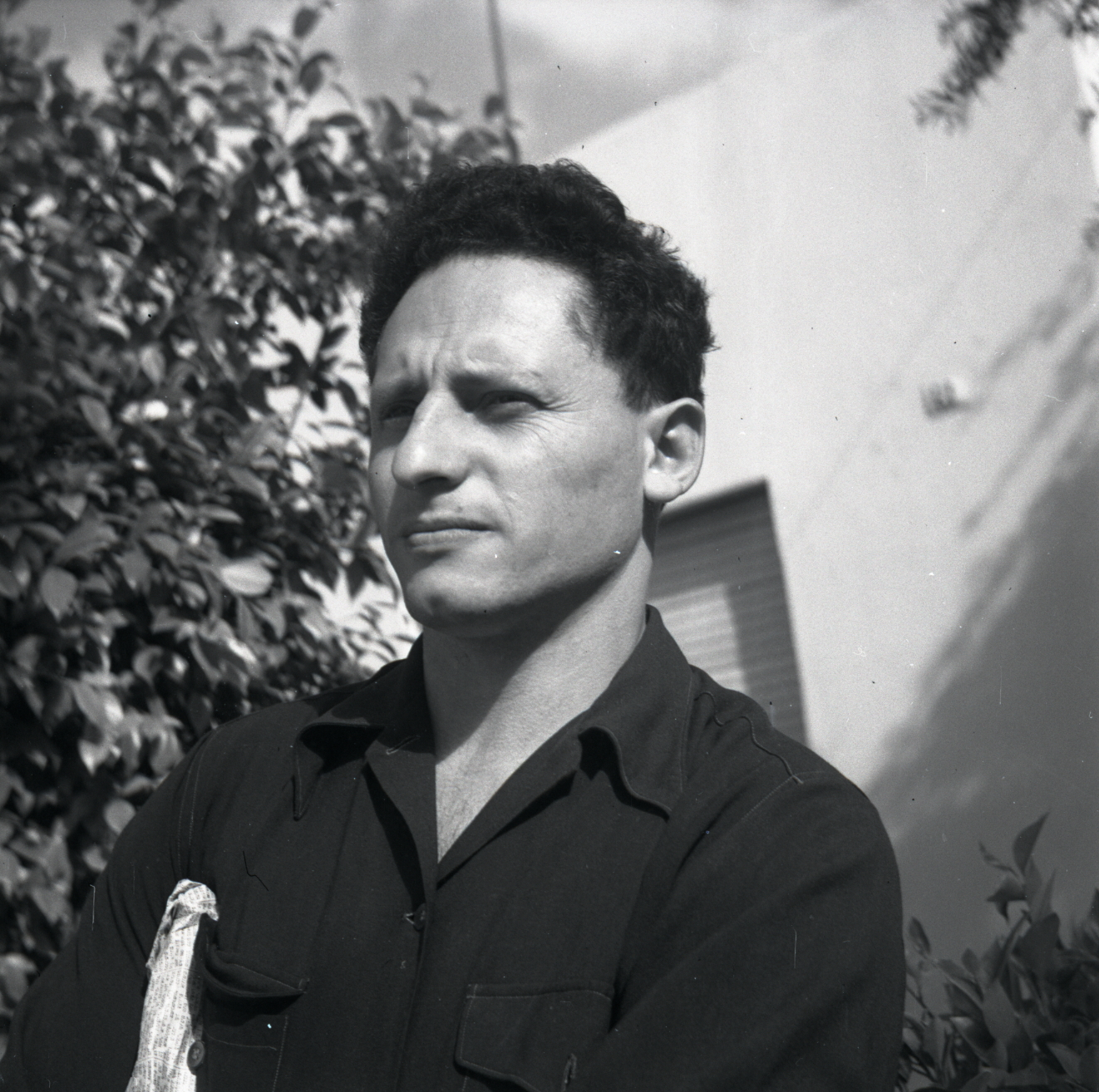
- Megged in 1952
- Native name: אהרון מגד
- Born: Aharon Greenberg; 10 August 1920 Włocławek, Second Polish Republic
- Died: 23 March 2016 (aged 95) Tel Aviv, Israel
- Occupation: Author; Playwright; Diplomat
- Notable works: The Evyatar Notebooks: a novel, Of Trees and Stones
- Notable awards: Israel Prize (2003); Bialik Prize (1974); Brenner Prize; S.Y. Agnon Prize; Prime Minister's Prize
- Spouse: Eda Zoritte
- Children: 2

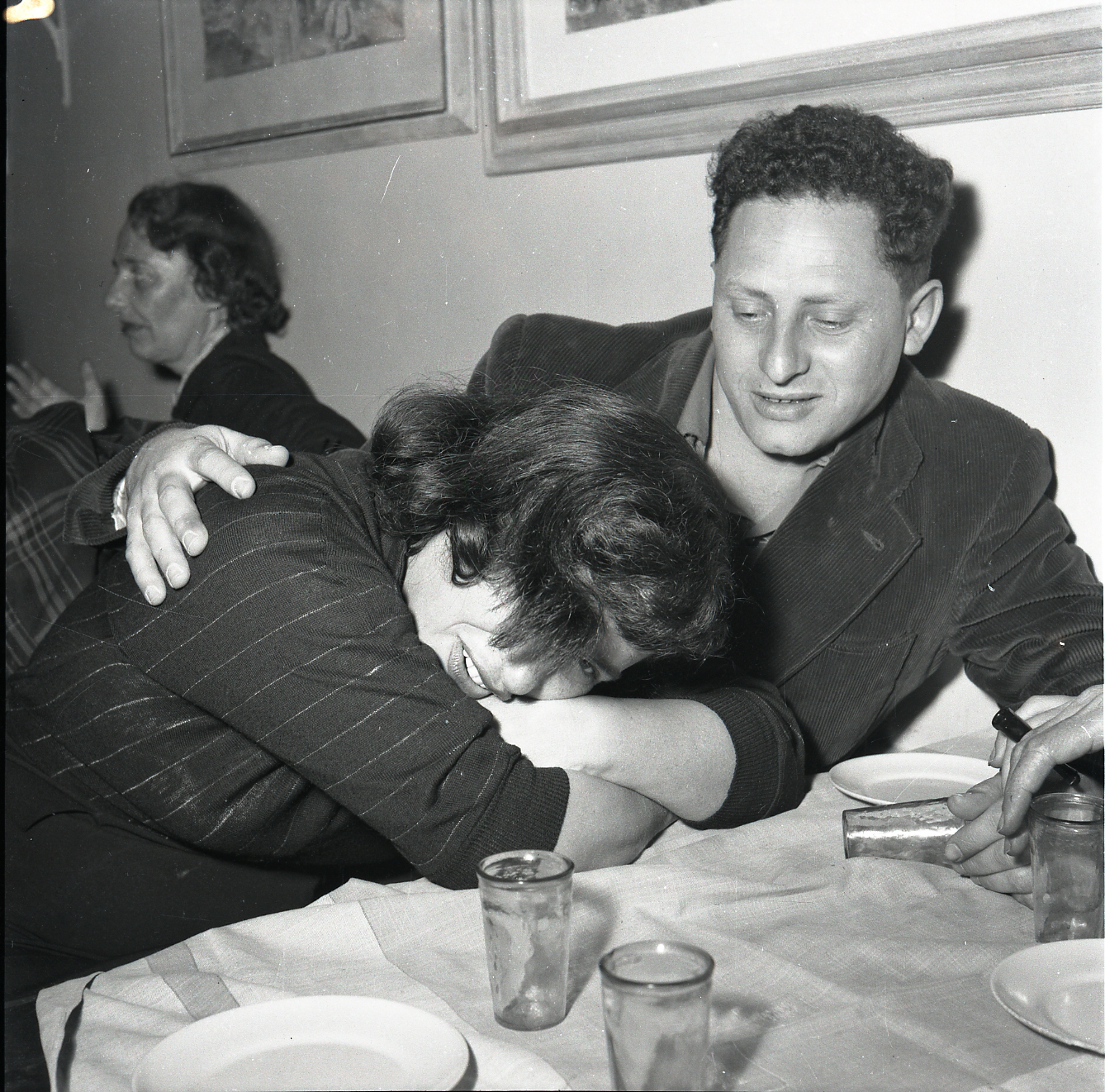
Megged, 1958

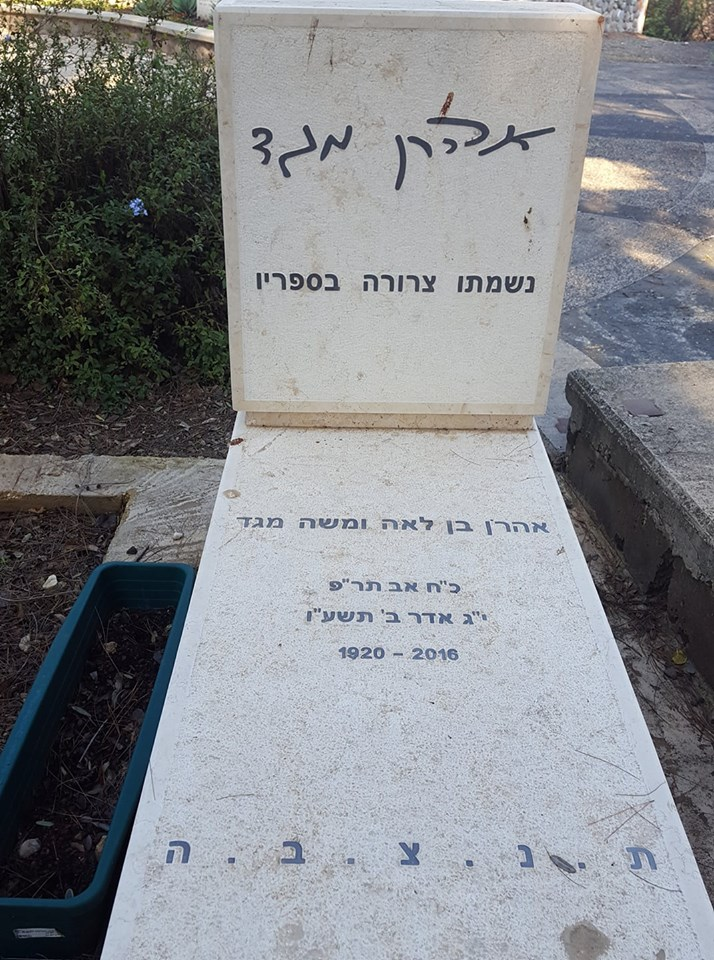
Megged's grave, Kinneret cemetery

Aharon Megged (Hebrew: אהרון מגד; 10 August 1920 – 23 March 2016) (Hebrew year 5680) was an Israeli author and playwright, a winner of multiple literary awards.

== Biography ==
Aharon Greenberg (later Megged) was born in Włocławek, Poland. In 1926, he immigrated with his parents to Mandate Palestine. He grew up in Ra'anana, attending Herzliya high school in Tel Aviv. After graduation, he joined a Zionist pioneering youth movement HaMahanot HaOlim, training at Kibbutz Giv'at Brenner. He was a member of Kibbutz Sdot Yam for twelve years. He left the kibbutz in 1951.

Megged was married to author Eda Zoritte, with whom he had two children.

== Literary career ==
Megged was one of the founders of the Masa literary weekly, and its editor for fifteen years. He worked as a literary editor for the Hebrew newspapers La-merhav and Davar. In 1977/78 he was author-in-residence at the Center for Hebrew Studies affiliated with the University of Oxford. He made several lecture tours of the United States, and was also author-in-residence at the University of Iowa. He published 35 books.

Megged's plays were performed at Habima, Ha-Ohel and other theaters. His books have been translated into numerous languages and published in the United Kingdom, the United States, Argentina, France, and other countries.

His books Hedva and I (1954), Fortunes of a Fool (1960), The Living and the Dead (1965), and The Short Life (1972) show contrast between idealistic kibbutzniks and materialistic city dwellers.

== Diplomatic career ==
From 1968 to 1971, Megged was cultural attaché to the Israeli embassy in London.

== Awards and recognition ==
- 1954: Ussishkin Prize for the book Hedva and I. The book was the base of the TV series Hedva and Shlomik
- 1974: Megged won the Bialik Prize for his books The Evyatar Notebooks: a novel and Of Trees and Stones.
- 2003: he was awarded the Israel Prize, for literature.
- 2004: Koret Jewish Book Award for the translated Foiglman in fiction category, tied with Barbara Honigmann’s “A Love Made Out of Nothing” and “Zohara’s Journey” (David R. Godine)

Megged also won the Brenner Prize, the S.Y. Agnon Prize, and the Prime Minister's Prize.

== Translated books ==
Only a small part of his books were translated:

- Fortunes of a Fool
- The Living on the Dead
- Asahel
- The Short Life
- Hedva and I (Spanish, English, Russian, French)
- The Flying Camel and the Golden Hump
- Of Trees and Stones
- Foiglman
- Heinz, His Son, and the Evil Spirit
- The Children's Journey to the Promised Land
- Till Evening Falls
- Hanna Senesz (play)
- The First Sin (play)
