= Ido Kass =

Israeli Defense Force officer

- Native name: עידו קס
- Born: 1985 (age 40–41); Kfar Bilu, Israel
- Rank: Aluf Mishne
- Conflicts: Second Lebanon War; Operation Cast Lead; Operation Pillar of Defense; Operation Protective Edge; Gaza war

Ido Kas (Hebrew: עידו קס; born in 1985) is an Israel Defence Force officer with the rank of Colonel, currently serving as the commander of the Fire arrows Formation.

== Biography ==
Kas was born and raised in Kfar Bilu. He enlisted in the IDF and volunteered for Shayetet 13. After completing his combat training and operational service, he finished an infantry officers' course. He served in various staff and command positions in Shayetet 13. In 2021, he was appointed as the head of the office of the Chief of General Staff Aviv Kochavi and later, Herzi Halevi. On September 4, 2023, he was appointed as the commander of the Fire arrows Formation. Kas commanded the brigade in the Gaza war, where it fought in the northern Gaza Strip in the Beit Hanoun and Beit Lahiya area, destroying Hamas infrastructure and killing many Hamas operatives. Subsequently, the brigade fought in the Jabalia refugee camp, where it also destroyed terrorist infrastructure and targeted Hamas operatives.
