= Ze'ev Raban =

Israeli painter, decorative artist and industrial designer

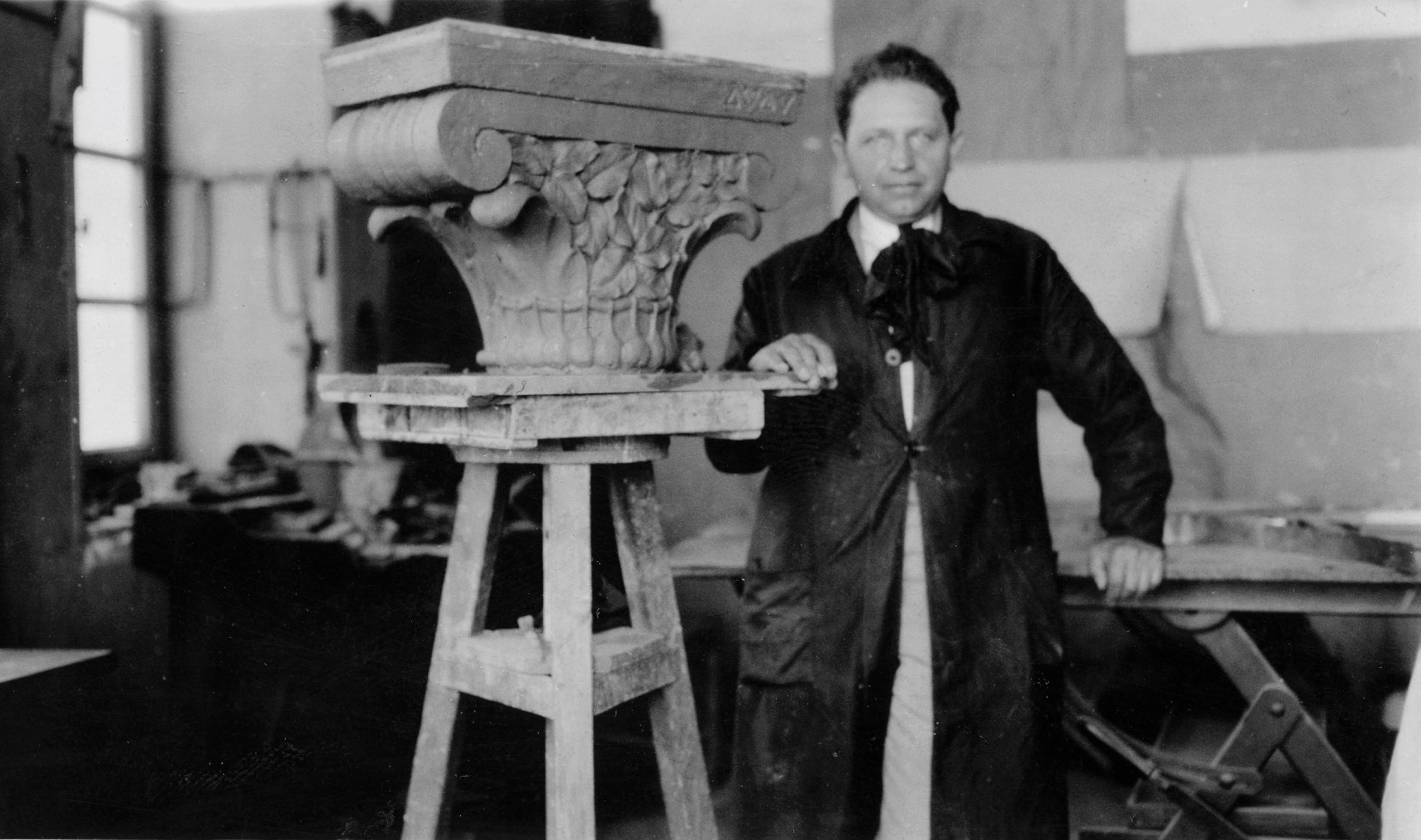
Ze'ev Raban, 1930

Ze’ev Raban (Hebrew: זאב רבן; 22 September 1890 – 19 January 1970), born Wolf Rawicki (Ravitzki), was a leading painter, decorative artist, and industrial designer of the Bezalel school style, and was one of the founders of the Israeli art world.

== Biography ==
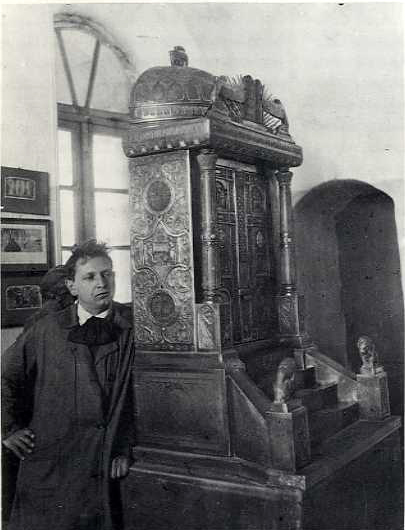
Raban with Bezalel Torah ark

=== Early life and education ===
Wolf Rawicki (later Ze'ev Raban) was born in Łódź, Congress Poland, and began his studies there. He continued his studies in sculpture and architectural ornamentation at a number of European art academies. These included, in 1905, the School of Applied Art in Munich at the height of the Jugendstil movement; in 1907, the neo-classical studio of Marius-Jean-Antonin Mercié at the École des Beaux-Arts in Paris; the Académie Royale des Beaux-Arts in Brussels, then a center of Art Nouveau, under symbolist and idealist artists Victor Rousseau and Constant Montald; and in 1912 he left Europe, joining the Bezalel School of Art in Jerusalem (see below).

=== Ottoman and British Mandate Palestine ===
Poster for the Society for the Promotion of Travel in the Holy Land. 1929 Lithograph

==== Studies ====
Under the influence of Boris Schatz, the founder of the Bezalel School of Art, Raban moved to the Ottoman Palestine in 1912 during the wave of Zionist immigration known as the Second Aliyah. Here he continued his studies at the Bezalel school.

==== Teaching activity ====
Two years after following Schatz's call, Raban joined the faculty of the Bezalel school. Here he headed the Repoussé Department, taught anatomy and composition, painting and sculpture. Raban also became director of the Graphics Press and the Industrial Art Studio. In 1914 his designs constituted the majority of the works created in the Bezalel workshop. Raban taught at Bezalel until the school had to close down in 1929 due to financial difficulties.

==== Tower of David exhibition ====
In 1921, he participated in the historic art exhibition at the Tower of David in Jerusalem, the first exhibit of Hebrew artists in Palestine, which became the first of an annual series of such exhibits.

== Artistic style and range ==
=== Style ===
Raban is regarded as a leading member of the Bezalel school art style, in which artists portrayed both Biblical and Zionist themes in a style influenced by the European Jugendstil (similar to Art Nouveau) and by traditional Persian and Syrian styles.

Like other European art nouveau artists of the period, such as Alphonse Mucha, Raban combined commercial commissions with uncommissioned paintings.

"Raban navigated a wealth of artistic sources and mediums, borrowing and combining ideas from East and West, fine arts and crafts from past and present. His works blended European neoclassicism, Symbolist art and Art Nouveau with oriental forms and techniques to form a distinctive visual lexicon. Versatile and productive, he lent this unique style to most artistic mediums, including the fine arts, illustration, sculpture, repousee, jewellery design, and ceramics."

=== Book illustration and graphic design ===
Good examples of Raban's specific eclectic mix of European and Oriental styles are his illustrated editions of the Book of Ruth, Song of Songs, Book of Job, Book of Esther, and the Passover Hagadah. Known are also his playing cards, where in the suit of leaves, the King is Ahasuerus and the Queen is Esther. He also designed a wide range of day-to-day objects, including commercial packaging for products such as Hanukkah candles and Jaffa oranges, tourism posters, and insignia for Zionist institutions.

=== "Bezalel ceramics" (tile murals) ===
Raban collaborated with other artists to produce versions of his work as ceramic tile murals, of the so-called "Bezalel ceramics" type, a number of which can still be sees on buildings in Tel Aviv and Jerusalem, including the Bialik House. The 1925 Lederberg house, at the intersection of Rothschild Boulevard and Allenby Street features a series of large ceramic murals designed by Raban. The four murals show a Jewish pioneer sowing and harvesting, a shepherd, and Jerusalem with a verse from Jeremiah 31:4, "Again I will rebuild thee and thous shalt be rebuilt."

=== Architectural decoration ===
Raban designed the decorative elements of such important Jerusalem buildings as the King David Hotel and the Jerusalem YMCA.

=== Judaica ===
Raban also designed a wide range of Jewish religious objects, including Hanukkah menorahs, temple windows, and Torah arks. Temple Emanuel (Beaumont, Texas) has a notable set of six windows, each 16-feet high]. The windows were commissioned from Raban in 1922 by Rabbi Samuel Rosinger. Each window depicts an event in the life of one of the principal Hebrew prophets, Jeremiah, Elijah, Elisha, Ezekiel, Moses, and Isaiah.

In 2015 one of his works received international attention. The President of Israel, Reuven Rivlin visited at the White House with U.S. President Barack Obama and First Lady Michelle Obama for the December 2015 Hannukah celebration. Israel's First Lady Nechama Rivlin joined her husband in lighting a menorah made in Israel by Raban, and loaned by the North Carolina Museum of Art's Judaic Art Gallery. The White House noted: "The design elements of this menorah underscore a theme of coexistence, and its presence in the collection of the Judaic Art Gallery in North Carolina highlights the ties between American Jews and Israeli Jews and the vibrancy of Jewish life in the American South."

== See also ==
- Visual arts in Israel
