= Temple Emanuel (Beaumont, Texas) =

Reform Jewish synagogue in Beaumont, Texas

- Location in Texas

Religion
- Affiliation: Reform Judaism
- Ecclesiastical or organizational status: Synagogue
- Leadership: Lay led
- Status: Active
- Notable feature: Six windows by Ze'ev Raban

Location
- Location: 1120 Broadway, Beaumont, Texas 77701
- Country: United States
- Interactive map of Temple Emanuel
- Coordinates: 30°05′07″N 94°06′21″W

Architecture
- Architect: Albert S. Gottlieb
- Type: Synagogue
- Style: Byzantine Revival
- Established: 1895 (as a congregation)
- Completed: 1923

Specifications
- Dome: One
- Materials: Brick; copper; limestone

Website
- emanuelbeaumont.org

Temple Emanuel is a Reform Jewish synagogue located at 1120 Broadway in Beaumont, Texas, in the United States.

The congregation was founded in September 1895, and erected its first building in 1901. The eclectic wooden synagogue building with Gothic, classical, and Byzantine-inspired elements was replaced by the congregation's current brick synagogue building in 1923, designed by Albert S. Gottlieb in the Byzantine Revival style, complete with a cooper dome.

Particularly notable are the congregation's set of six windows, each 16 by 6 feet (4.9 m × 1.8 m), designed by Ze'ev Raban. The windows were commissioned from Raban in 1922 by Rabbi Samuel Rosinger. Each window depicts an event in the life of one of the principal Hebrew prophets, Jeremiah, Elijah, Elisha, Ezekiel, Moses, and Isaiah.

In 1971, Temple Emanuel merged with Congregation Kol Israel; and in 1985, Rodef Shalom, a synagogue in Port Arthur, merged into Temple Emanuel.
