= Bialik House =

Coordinates: 32.072888°N 34.771007°E

- בית ביאליק
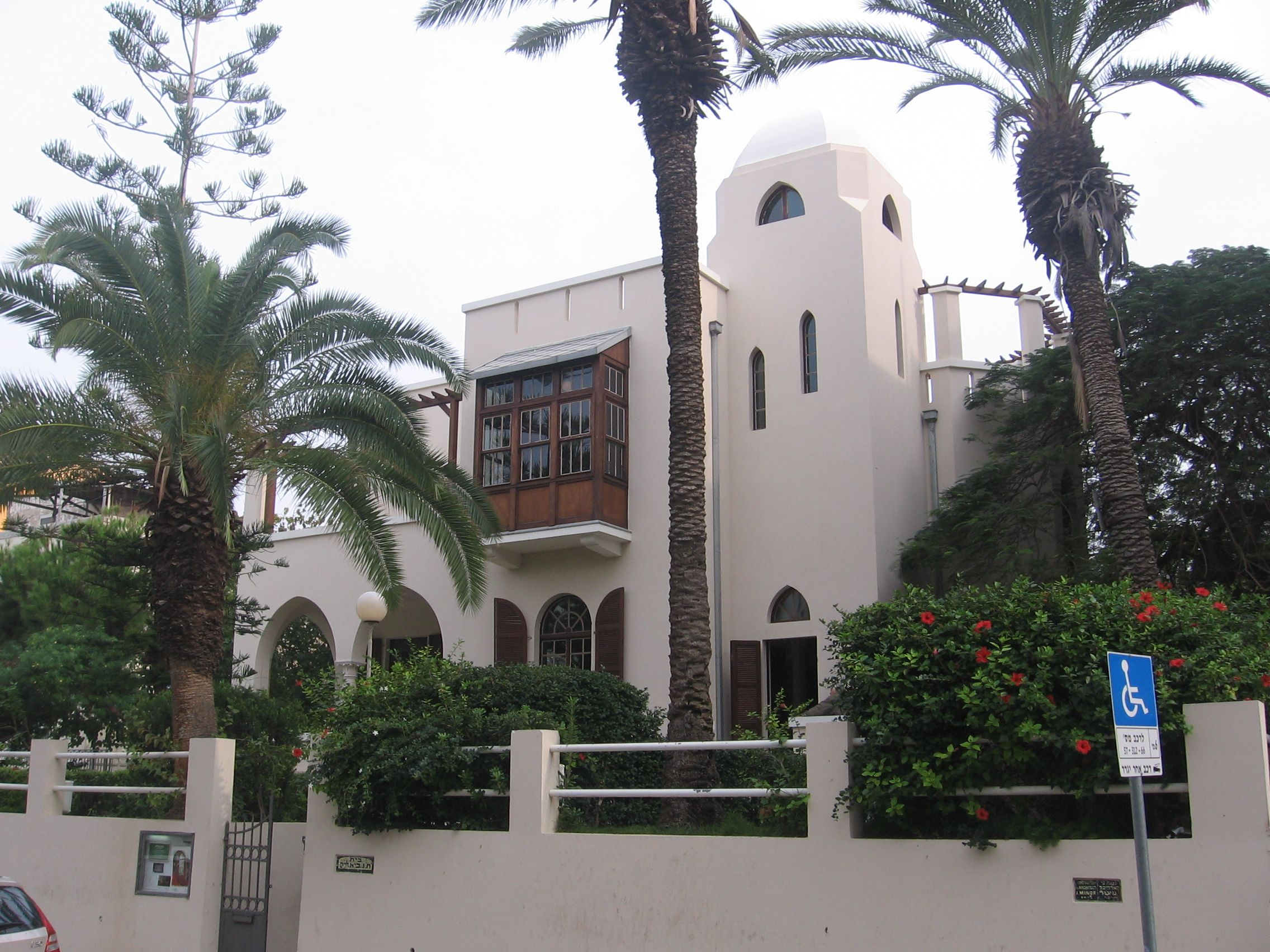
- Bialik House

General information
- Type: Residential
- Architectural style: Arts and Crafts, Hebrew Revival
- Location: 22 Bialik Street, Tel Aviv, Israel
- Construction started: 1924
- Completed: 1925
- Client: Hayyim Nahman Bialik

Design and construction
- Architect: Joseph Minor

Website
- Bialik House Museum

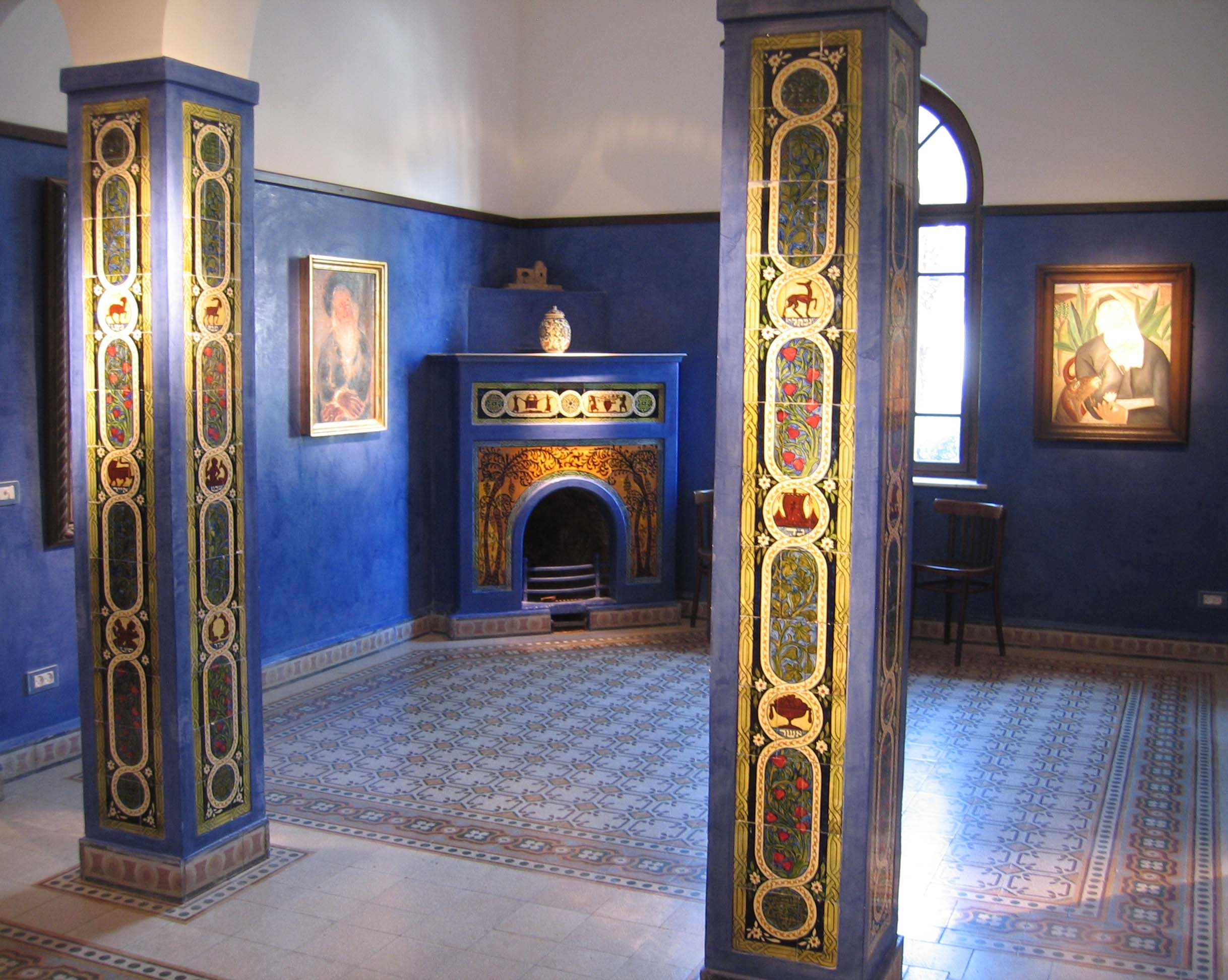
Bezalel school tiles indoors

Bialik House (Hebrew: בית ביאליק, Beit Bialik) was the home of the Hebrew national poet Hayyim Nahman Bialik in the center of Tel Aviv, Israel, and is now used as a museum. The museum is located on 22 Bialik Street, Tel Aviv, close to the old city hall building.

== History ==
Bialik purchased a plot of land in Tel Aviv through the offices of the Geula company before settling in Israel in March 1924. The site was a sandy area leading off Allenby Street not far from a hotel under construction that later became the Tel Aviv municipality. A foundation stone-laying ceremony was held in the presence of Bialik's close friends, among them Ahad Haam, a resident of Tel Aviv since 1922. The house was built by the Solel Boneh company under the supervision of Eliezer Kaplan, later Israel's first minister of finance.

== Architecture ==
The house was built in 1925 by Joseph Minor, an architect who had studied under Alexander Baerwald. The two were among a group of architects attempting to develop a "Hebrew style" of architecture, by combining western building forms with stylistic elements characteristic of the Middle East or thought or known to have been in use in the ancient Jewish kingdoms of Eretz Israel. While the interior is in the Arts and Crafts movement style, then popular in northern Europe, orientalizing features include a tower, outdoor terraces, domes, pointed-arch windows and extensive tile work.

The most notable tiles are in the first floor reception room. Here, the entryway features a columned archway featuring the tiles produced by the Bezalel school featuring the designs of Ze'ev Raban produced as ceramic art tiles. One of the columns has tile cartouches of the twelve months, the other, the twelve tribes of Israel. On the sides are a pair of cartouches, one, the famous "Judea capta" coin issued by the Emperor Titus after the Roman defeat of the Jewish Revolt of the year 70. The well-known coin shows a woman, Judea, sitting under a palm tree in chains, over her stands the Roman Emperor in armor. The artist riffs on this familiar image with a scene featuring Judea liberated, rising as the chains break.

== See also ==
- Architecture in Israel
- Culture of Israel
