= Ira Jan =

Russian artist, writer (1869–1919)

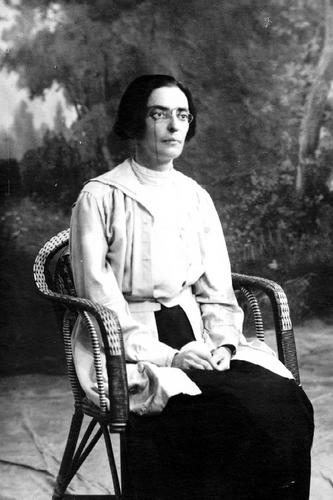
- Born: Esther Yoselevitch Slepyan; 2 February 1869; Chișinău, Bessarabia Governorate, Russian Empire
- Died: 24 April 1919 (aged 50); Tel Aviv, Occupied Enemy Territory Administration
- Resting place: Trumpeldor Cemetery
- Spouse: Dmitry Slepian
- Partner: Hayim Nahman Bialik

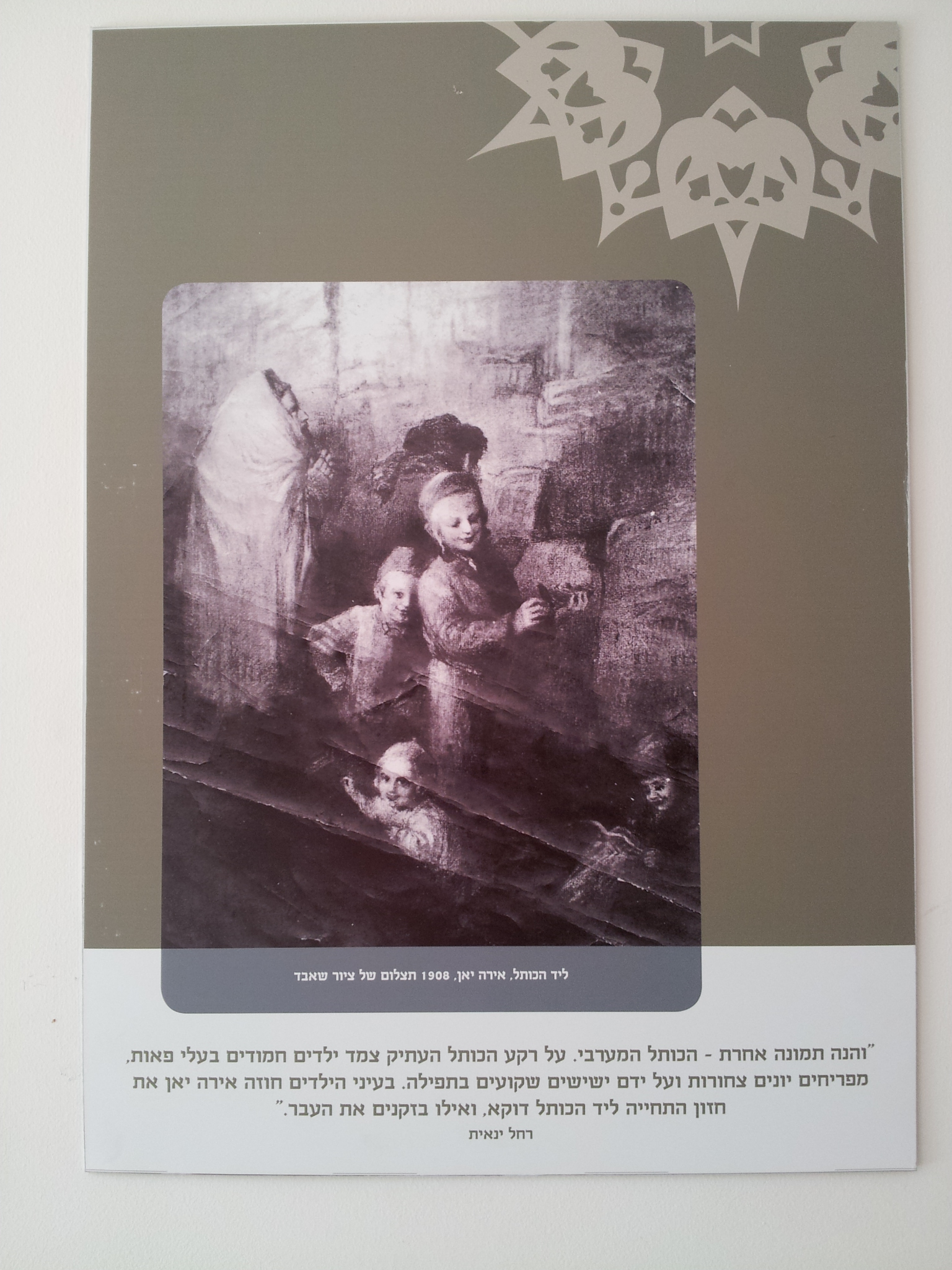
A lost painting by Ira Jan. Photo in the archives of Rachel Yanait Ben-Zvi

Ira Jan (Russian: И́ра Ян) is the pseudonym of Russian-born Jewish painter and writer Esther Yoselevitch Slepyan (Эсфи́рь Иосиле́вич Слепя́н; 2 February 1869 – 24 April 1919).She was a member of the commune at Bezalel and among the founders of Gymnasia Rehavia.

== Biography ==
Esther Yoselevitch was the youngest of three children of a Jewish family in Kishinev, then in the Russian Empire (now part of Moldova). Her father, Joseph (Osip) Yoselevitch, was an influential Russian lawyer. Recognizing her artistic talent, her father sent her at the age of 16 to study at the Moscow School of Painting, Sculpture and Architecture in Moscow, an uncommon move in Jewish society at that time. After completing her studies in Moscow, she studied in Paris, where her brother, Shimon, was practicing medicine. After returning to Kishinev, she became involved with the Socialist Revolutionary Party, one of whom was the bacteriology student Dmitry Slepian (Дмитрий Слепян), whom she married and with whom she had a daughter, Elena (Елена).

In 1903, after the Kishinev pogrom, Hayim Nahman Bialik, later recognized as Israel's national poet, was sent to Kishinev by the Jewish Historical Commission in Odessa to interview survivors and prepare a report. During this time, Jan met Bialik and fell in love with him, leading her to leave her husband and revolutionary party. She wrote later, "These three weeks gave me the happiness of being with our great poet. He brought me back to my people and to himself."

In 1906 Jan immigrated to Ottoman Palestine with her daughter. In 1908 she settled in Jerusalem and became associated with a group of artists who called themselves "The New Jerusalem", founded by Boris Schatz whom she had met in Paris. She lived in a commune-like setting in a building near the Bezalel Academy together with Rachel Yanait Ben-Zvi, Yitzhak Ben-Zvi and others. During this period, she translated into Russian Bialik's prose poem Scroll of Fire and the poem The Dead of the Desert. Rachel Yanait and Jan became very close, and would walk around Jerusalem, with Jan drawing and painting scenes and people of the city. Jan also published some essays and poems in Eliezer Ben-Yehuda's newspaper HaZvi (later renamed "HaOr"). For lack of an appropriate school framework for their children, the artist group also founded the Gymnasia Rehavia.

In 1914, following the outbreak of World War I, Jan moved to Tel Aviv and lived in the Adler House. There she continued to teach drawing at the Herzliya Hebrew Gymnasium, where Nachum Gutman was one of her students. In the 1917 Tel Aviv and Jaffa deportation Jan was deported to Alexandria in Egypt, where she lived in poverty for four months, and contracted tuberculosis. Just before the deportation, she managed to hastily hide all her large oil paintings in the Tel Aviv attic of Avraham Brill, a Jewish Colonization Association official, and upon returning to Tel Aviv she discovered that all had disappeared. She died of the tuberculosis, heartbroken at the loss of her works.

== Relationship with Bialik ==
From the 1980s, academic studies uncovered the tangled web of Bialik and Ira Jan's love. With the pogrom in the background, Jan fell in love with the poet, left her husband and prior beliefs, and immigrated to The Land of Israel.

Bialik was married, but heartbroken by the fact that they were childless, and was obviously attracted to the artist. Some scholars, including Ziva Shamir and Hillel Barzel, believe that at least two of Bialik's poems, "Thou Art Leaving Me" (״הולכת את מעמי״) and "To Your Secret Path" (״לנתיבך הנעלם״), were dedicated to Jan.

Bialik apparently concealed his love to her for fear of losing his reputation, cut all contact with her after she left for the Land of Israel, and only went to the Land of Israel himself after she had died. Only in 1972 did some scholars reveal some letters that expressed Bialik's big secret, that were hidden by Moshe Ungerfeld, the second administrator of the Bialik House. Ungerfeld's incentive, too, was protecting Bialik's reputation. Additional related material was found after Ungerfeld's death in 1983.

Ziva Shamir believes that a large portion of Bialik's works were directly inspired by his relationship with Jan, that, in her opinion, were the central love affair of his life.
