= Yehoshua Hana Rawnitzki =

Hebrew publisher and editor

Yehoshua Rawnitzki
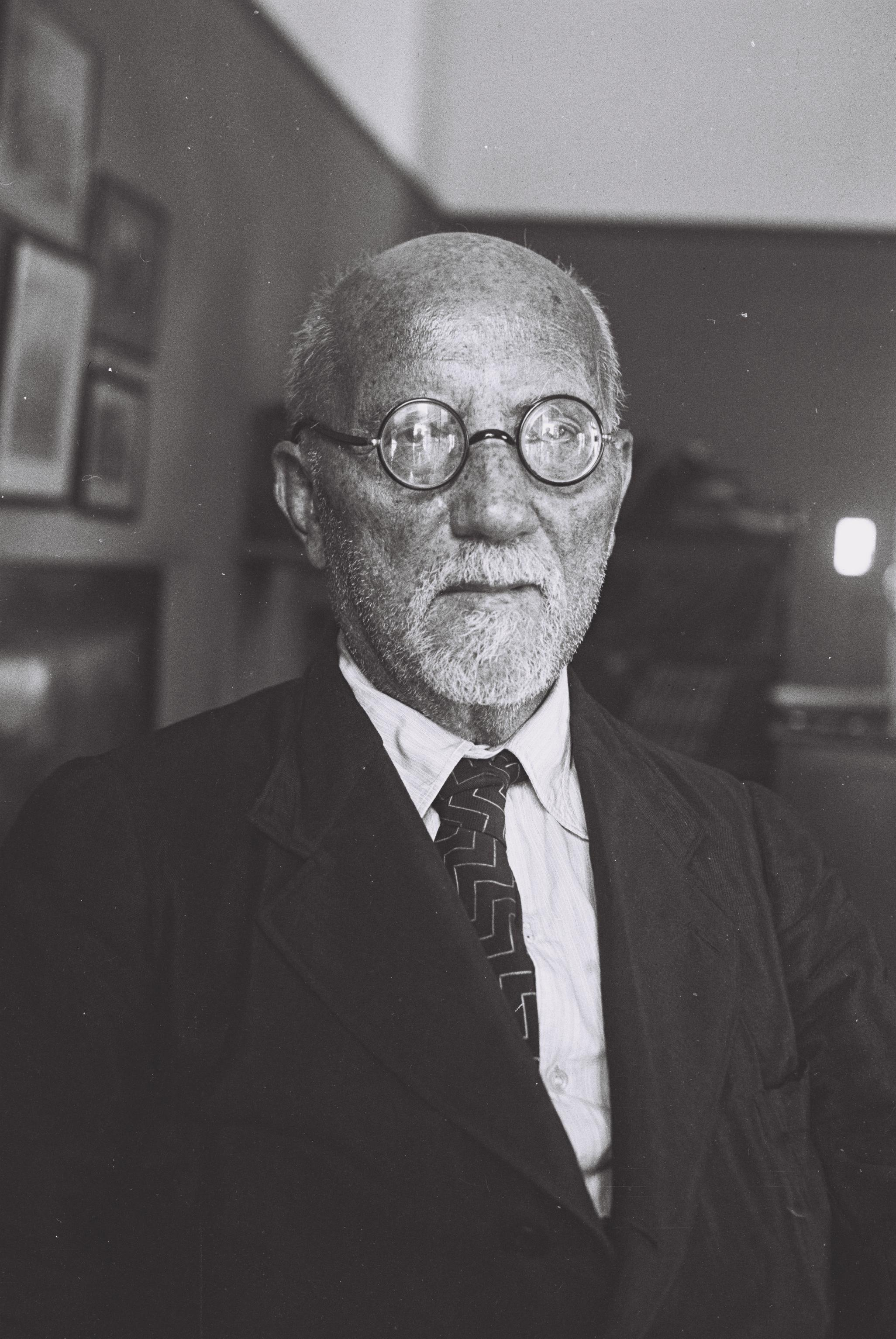
- Photograph of Rawnitzki by Zoltan Kluger
- Native name: יהושע רבניצקי
- Born: September 13, 1859 Odessa, Russian Empire
- Died: May 4, 1944 (aged 84) Tel Aviv, Mandatory Palestine
- Language: Hebrew, Yiddish

Yehoshua Ḥana Rawnitzki (Hebrew: יהושע חנא רבניצקי; 13 September 1859 – 4 May 1944) was a Hebrew publisher, editor, and collaborator of Hayim Nahman Bialik.

== Biography ==
Yehoshua Ḥana Rawnitzki was born to a poor Jewish family in Odessa in 1859. He began his journalistic career in 1879, by contributing first to Ha-Kol, and then to other periodicals. He was the editor and publisher of Pardes, a literary collection best known for publishing Hayim Nahman Bialik's first poem, "El ha-Tzippor," in 1892. With Sholem Aleichem (under the pseudonym Eldad), Rawnitzki (under the pseudonym Medad) published a series of feuilletons entitled Kevurat Soferim ("The Burial of Writers"). From 1908 through 1911, Rawnitzki and Bialik published Sefer Ha-Aggadah ("The Book of Legends") a compilation of aggadah from the Mishnah, the two Talmuds and the Midrash literature.

Rawnitzki moved to Palestine in 1921, where he took part in the founding of the Dvir publishing house. He died there in May 1944.
