= Givat Hen =

Moshav in central Israel

Givat Hen: גִּבְעַת חֵ״ן (Hebrew)
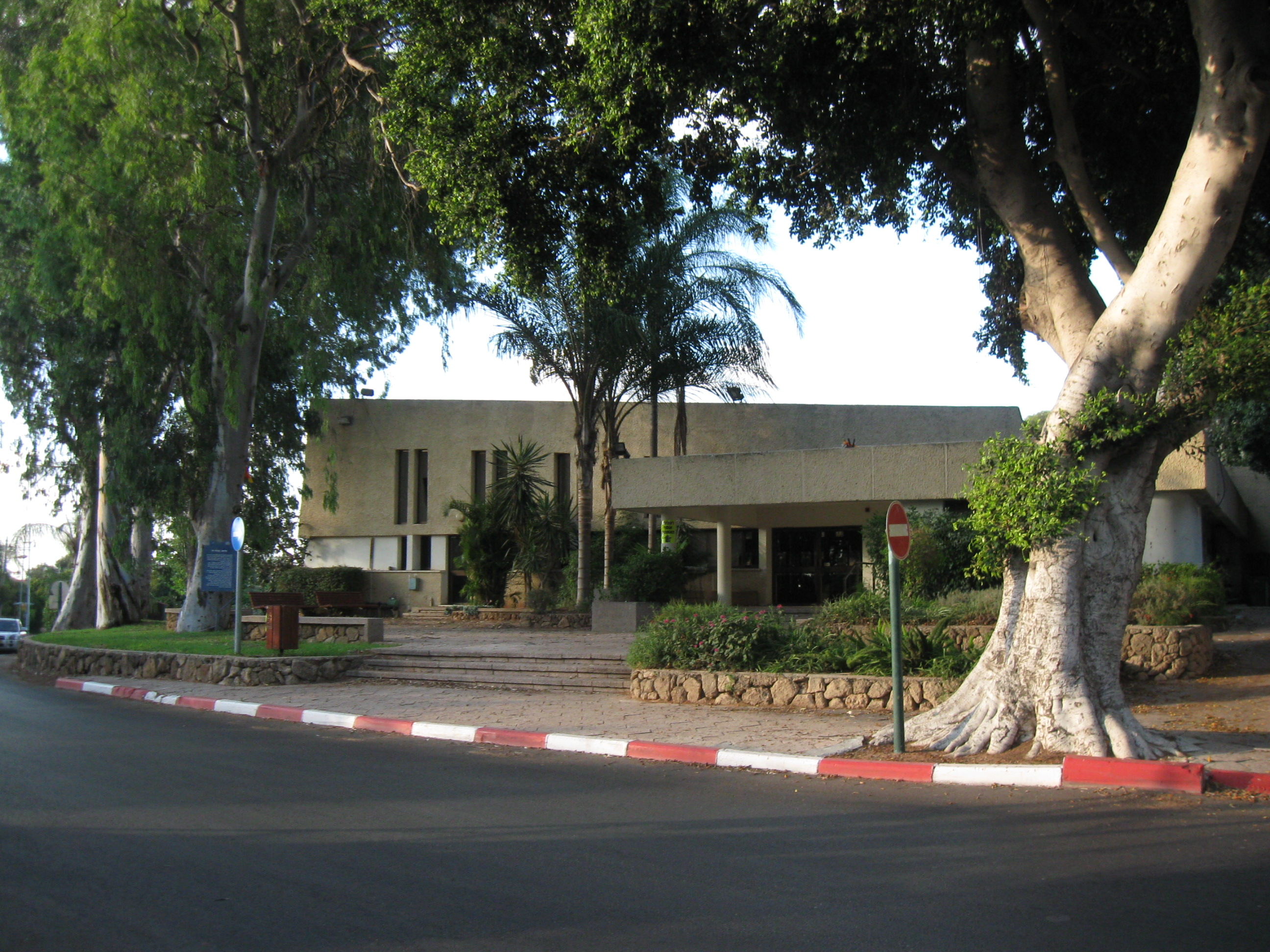

- Location within Central Israel
- Coordinates: 32°10′3″N 34°52′34″E
- Country: Israel
- District: Central
- Subdistrict: Petah Tikva
- Council: Drom HaSharon
- Affiliation: Moshavim Movement
- Founded: 1933
- Founder: Eastern European immigrants
- Population (2024): 532

Givat Hen (Hebrew: גִּבְעַת חֵ״ן, lit. 'HN Hill') is a moshav in central Israel. Located near Ra'anana, it falls under the jurisdiction of Drom HaSharon Regional Council. In 2024 it had a population of 532.

== History ==
Givat Hen was founded in 1933 by immigrants from Lithuania, Poland and Russia and was part of the Settlement of the Thousand plan. They were later joined by immigrants from Germany.

The name of the moshav is based on the initials of Hayyim Nahman Bialik (HN), and the street names are based upon the names of poems he wrote.

== Notable residents ==
- Uri Adelman
