= Hayim Nahman Bialik =

Hebrew poet, author, and editor (1873–1934)

- חיים נחמן ביאַליק
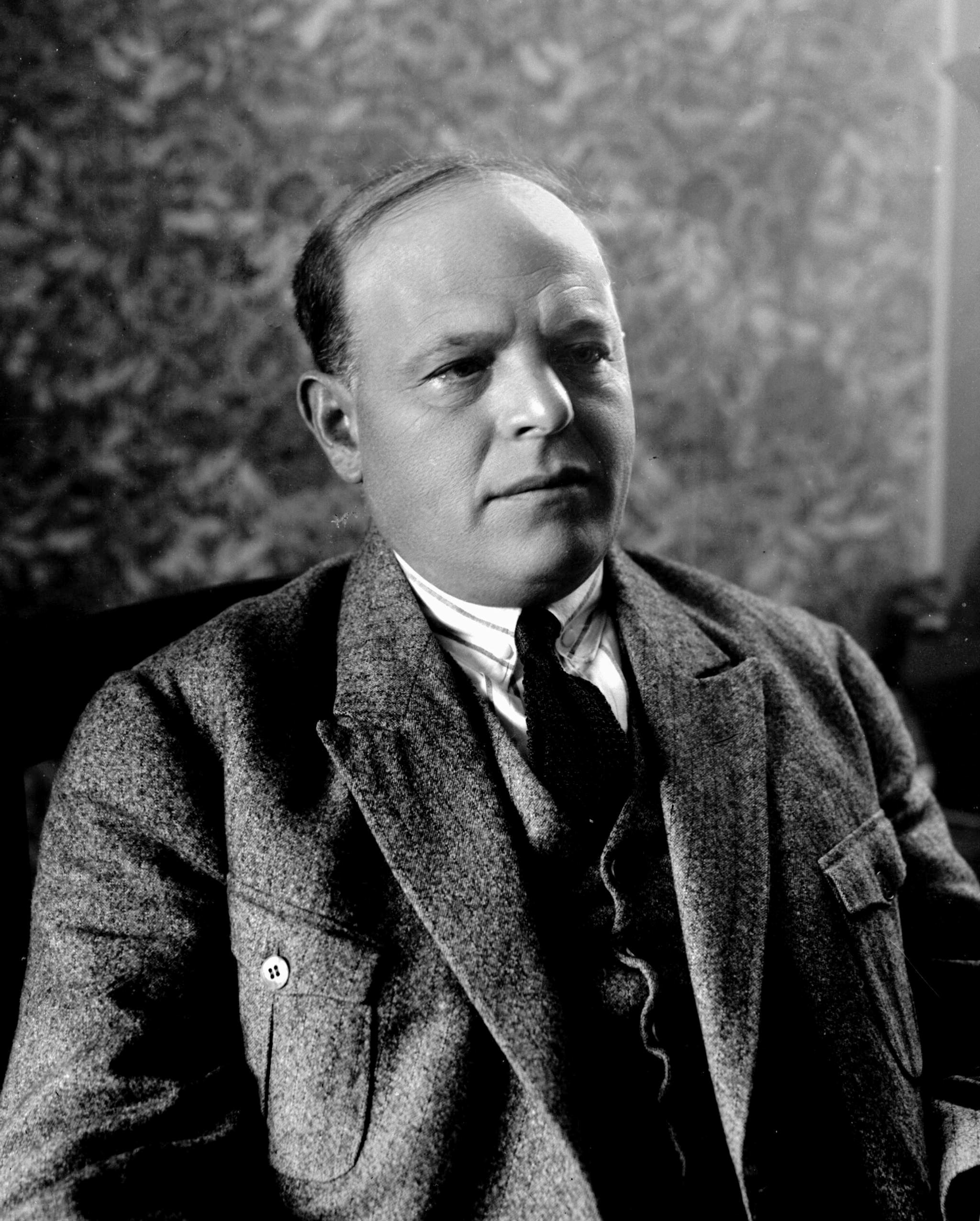
- Bialik, 1923
- Born: January 9, 1873; Ivnytsia, Volhynian Governorate, Russian Empire (present day Zhytomyr Oblast, Ukraine)
- Died: July 4, 1934 (aged 61); Vienna, Austria
- Resting place: Trumpeldor Cemetery, Israel
- Occupations: Poet, journalist, children's writer, translator
- Writing career
- Movement: Hovevei Zion

Hayim Nahman Bialik (Hebrew: חיים נחמן ביאַליק; January 9, 1873 – July 4, 1934) (Note: Also spelled Hayyim, Chayyim, Chaim or Haim) was a Russian-Jewish poet who wrote primarily in Hebrew and Yiddish. Bialik is considered a pioneer of modern Hebrew poetry, part of the vanguard of Jewish thinkers who gave voice to the new spirit of the time in the Jewish world. He is recognized today as Israel's national poet. Aside from his work as an essayist, poet and story-teller, Bialik translated major works from European languages into Hebrew.

== Biography ==
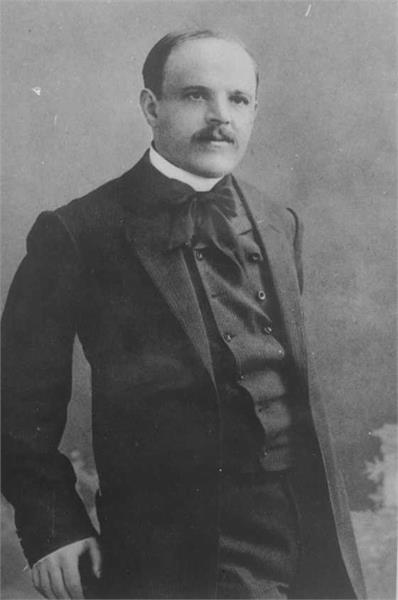
Hayim Nahman Bialik in 1905

Hayim Nahman Bialik was born in Radi, Volhynia Governorate in the Russian Empire to Itzik Yosef Bialik, a wood merchant from Zhytomyr, and his wife, Dinah Priveh. He had an older brother, Sheftel (born in 1862), and two sisters, Chenya-Ides (born in 1871) and Bluma (born in 1875). When Bialik was 8 years old, his father died. His mother took him to Zhytomyr to live with his Orthodox grandfather, Yankl-Moishe Bialik. Bialik did not see his mother for over twenty years, until he brought her to Odessa to live with him.

In Zhytomyr, Bialik explored European literature alongside the traditional Jewish religious education he received. At the age of 15, he convinced his grandfather to send him to the Volozhin Yeshiva in Vilna Governorate to study under Naftali Zvi Yehuda Berlin, where he hoped he could continue his Jewish schooling while expanding his knowledge of European literature. There, Bialik encountered the Haskala (Jewish Enlightenment) movement and drifted away from yeshiva life (religious life). A story in the biography of Chaim Soloveitchik cites an anonymous student, presumably Bialik himself, being expelled from the Yeshiva for involvement in the Haskala movement. As Rabbi Chaim was escorting him out, Bialik asked, "Why?" In response, the rabbi said he had spent the time convincing Bialik not to use his writing talents against the yeshiva world. Poems such as HaMatmid ("The Talmud student"), written in 1898, reflect Bialik's great ambivalence toward that way of life: on the one hand, admiration for the dedication and devotion of the yeshiva students to their studies; on the other, a disdain for their narrow world.

At 18, Bialik left for Odessa, center of modern Jewish culture in the southern Russian Empire. He was drawn by his admiration for authors such as Mendele Mocher Sforim and Ahad Ha'am. There, Bialik studied the Russian and German languages and literature while dreaming of enrolling in the Orthodox Rabbinical Seminary in Berlin. Alone and penniless, Bialik made his living teaching Hebrew.

In 1892, Bialik published his first poem, El Hatzipor "To the Bird", which expresses a longing for Zion, in a booklet edited by Yehoshua Hana Rawnitzki (1859–1944), which opened the doors into the Jewish literary circles in Odessa. There, he joined the Hovevei Zion movement where he befriended the author Ahad Ha'am, who had a significant influence on his Zionist outlook.

In 1892, the Volozhin Yeshiva had closed and Bialik therefore returned home to Zhytomyr in order to prevent his grandfather from discovering that he had discontinued his religious education. He arrived to find both his grandfather and his older brother close to death. Following their deaths, Bialik married Manya Averbuch in 1893.

For a time, he served as a bookkeeper in his father-in-law's lumber business in Korostyshiv, near Kyiv. This proved unsuccessful, so in 1897 he moved to Sosnowiec, a small town in the Dąbrowa Basin in Vistula Land in Congress Poland, which was under Russian Control. There, Bialik worked both as a Hebrew teacher and, to earn extra income, a coal merchant. In 1900, feeling depressed by the provincial life of Sosnowiec, Bialik secured a teaching job in Odessa.

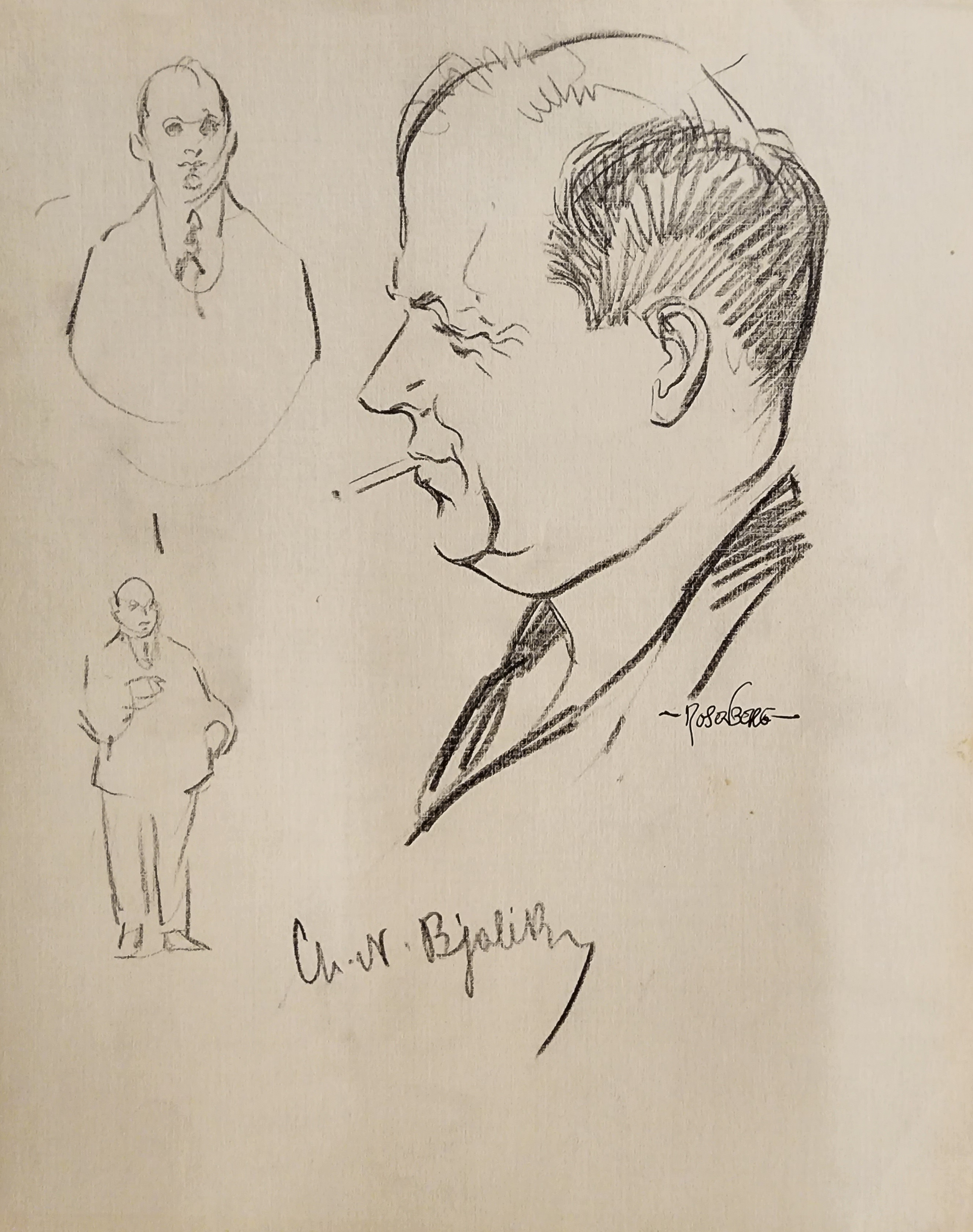
Signed drawing of Chaim Bialik by Manuel Rosenberg, 1926

Bialik visited the United States, where he stayed with his cousin Raymond Bialeck in Hartford, CT. He is the uncle of actress Mayim Bialik's great-great-grandfather.

== Literary career ==
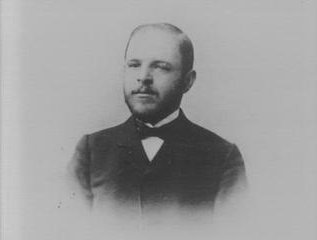
A young Bialik

The year 1900 marked the beginning of Bialik's "golden period": he continued his activities in Zionist and literary circles, and his literary fame continued to rise. In 1901 his first collection of poetry was published in Warsaw, where it was greeted with much critical acclaim, being hailed as "The Poet of National Renaissance". Bialik relocated to Warsaw briefly in 1904 to serve as literary editor of the weekly magazine Ha-Shiloaḥ founded by Ahad Ha'am, a position he served for six years.

In 1903, in the wake of the Kishinev pogroms, the Jewish Historical Commission in Odessa asked Bialik to travel to Kishiniev (today Chișinău) to interview survivors and prepare a report. In response to his findings, Bialik wrote his epic poem "In the City of Slaughter" (originally published under the name "Massa Nemirov"), a powerful statement of anguish at the situation of the Jews. The poem's condemnation of passivity against antisemitic violence is said to have inspired thousands of Jewish youths to cast off their pacifism and join the Russian underground against the Czar, the founding of Jewish self-defense groups in the Russian Empire, and, later on, the Haganah in Palestine.

…Get up and walk through the city of the massacre,
And with your hand touch and lock your eyes
On the cooled brain and clots of blood
Dried on tree trunks, rocks, and fences; it is they.
Go to the ruins, to the gaping breaches,
To walls and hearths, shattered as though by thunder:
Concealing the blackness of a naked brick,
A crowbar has embedded itself deeply, like a crushing crowbar,
And those holes are like black wounds,
For which there is no healing or doctor.
Take a step, and your footstep will sink: you have placed your foot in fluff,
Into fragments of utensils, into rags, into shreds of books:
Bit by bit they were amassed through arduous labor—and in a flash,
Everything is destroyed…
And you will come out into the road—
Acacias are blooming and pouring their aroma,
And their blooms are like fluff, and they smell as though of blood.
And their sweet fumes will enter your breast, as though deliberately,
Beckoning you to springtime, and to life, and to health;
And the dear little sun warms and, teasing your grief,
Splinters of broken glass burn with a diamond fire—
God sent everything at once, everyone feasted together:
The sun, and the spring, and the red massacre!

— Excerpt from the poem "In the City of Slaughter", translated by Vladimir Jabotinsky

It was during his visit to Odessa that Bialik first met the painter Ira Jan, with whom he conducted a secret love affair for many years.

In the early 1900s, Bialik, together with Yehoshua Rawnitzki, Simcha Ben Zion and Elhanan Leib Lewinsky, founded Moriah, a publishing house aimed at issuing Hebrew classics and school texts. He translated into Hebrew various European works, such as William Shakespeare's Julius Caesar, Friedrich Schiller's William Tell, Miguel de Cervantes's novel Don Quixote, Heinrich Heine's poems, and S. Ansky's The Dybbuk.

Throughout the years 1899–1915, Bialik published about 20 of his Yiddish poems in different periodicals throughout the Russian Empire. These poems are often considered to be among the best of modern Yiddish poetry. Starting in 1908, Bialik switched to writing in prose: In collaboration with Rawnitzki, Bialik published Sefer HaAggadah (The Book of Legends, 1908–1911), a two-volume edition of the folk tales and proverbs scattered throughout the Talmud. The book comprises a selection of hundreds of texts arranged thematically. It was immediately recognized as a masterwork and has been reprinted numerous times. Bialik also edited the poems of the Andalusi poet and philosopher Solomon ibn Gabirol and began a modern commentary on the Mishna, but only completed Zeraim, the first of the six Sedarim (Orders), of the Mishna. For this, Bialik intentionally chose to use the traditional Vilna edition of the Mishnah instead of a more scientific text and created, arguably, the first modern commentary to a Seder of Mishnah that included, in its introduction, a summary of the content as well as all of the relevant biblical passages. In the 1950s, under the direction of Hanoch Albeck, the Bialik Institute published a commentary on the entire Mishnah, an expansion of Bialik's project.

In 1919 in Odessa, Bialik founded the Dvir publishing house. The institution, now based in Israel, is known today as Kinneret Zmora-Bitan Dvir after it was purchased by the Zmora-Bitan publishing house in 1986, and subsequently merged with Kinneret Publishing. It was in Odessa, where BIalik befriended the soprano Isa Kremer, and inspired her to become the first woman sing Yiddish music on the concert stage.

Bialik remained in Odessa until 1921, when the Moriah publishing house was closed by Soviet authorities as a result of mounting paranoia following the Bolshevik Revolution. Through the intervention of Maxim Gorky, a group of Hebrew writers were given permission by the Soviet government to leave the country.

== Move to Germany ==
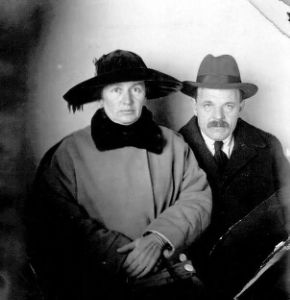
Hayim Nahman and his wife Manya in 1925

Bialik moved, via the Second Polish Republic and Revolutionary Ankara Turkey, to Berlin, where, together with his friends Yehoshua Rawnitzki and Shmaryahu Levin, he re-established the Dvir publishing house. There, in collaboration with the rabbinical college Hochschule für die Wissenschaft des Judentums, Bialik published the first Hebrew language scientific journal.

In Germany, Bialik joined a community of noted Jewish authors and publishers. Among them were Shmuel Yosef Agnon, Salman Schocken (owner of Schocken Department Stores and founder of Schocken Books), the historian Simon Dubnow, Israel Isidor Elyashev, Uri Zvi Greenberg, Jakob Klatzkin (cofounder of the Eshkol publishing house in Berlin), Moyshe Kulbak, Zeev Latsky ("Bertoldi") (cofounder of Klal-farlag publishing house in Berlin in 1922), Simon Rawidowicz (co-founder of Klal-farlag) Zalman Shneour, Nochum Shtif, Shaul Tchernichovsky, Shoshana Persitz (founder of Omanut publishing house) and Martin Buber. They met routinely at the Hebrew Committee House (Hebrew: בת וועד העברי, romanized: Bet Havad haIvri) in Berlin's Scheunenviertel, in Café Monopol, which had a Hebrew-speaking corner, or Café des Westens (both in Berlin's more elegant western boroughs).

Bialik succeeded Klal Publishing's Hebrew chief editor, Saul Israel Hurwitz, upon his death on August 8, 1922, during which time 80 titles were published.

In January 1923, Bialik's 50th birthday was celebrated in the old concert hall of the Berlin Philharmonic, bringing together everybody who was anybody.

== Move to Tel Aviv ==
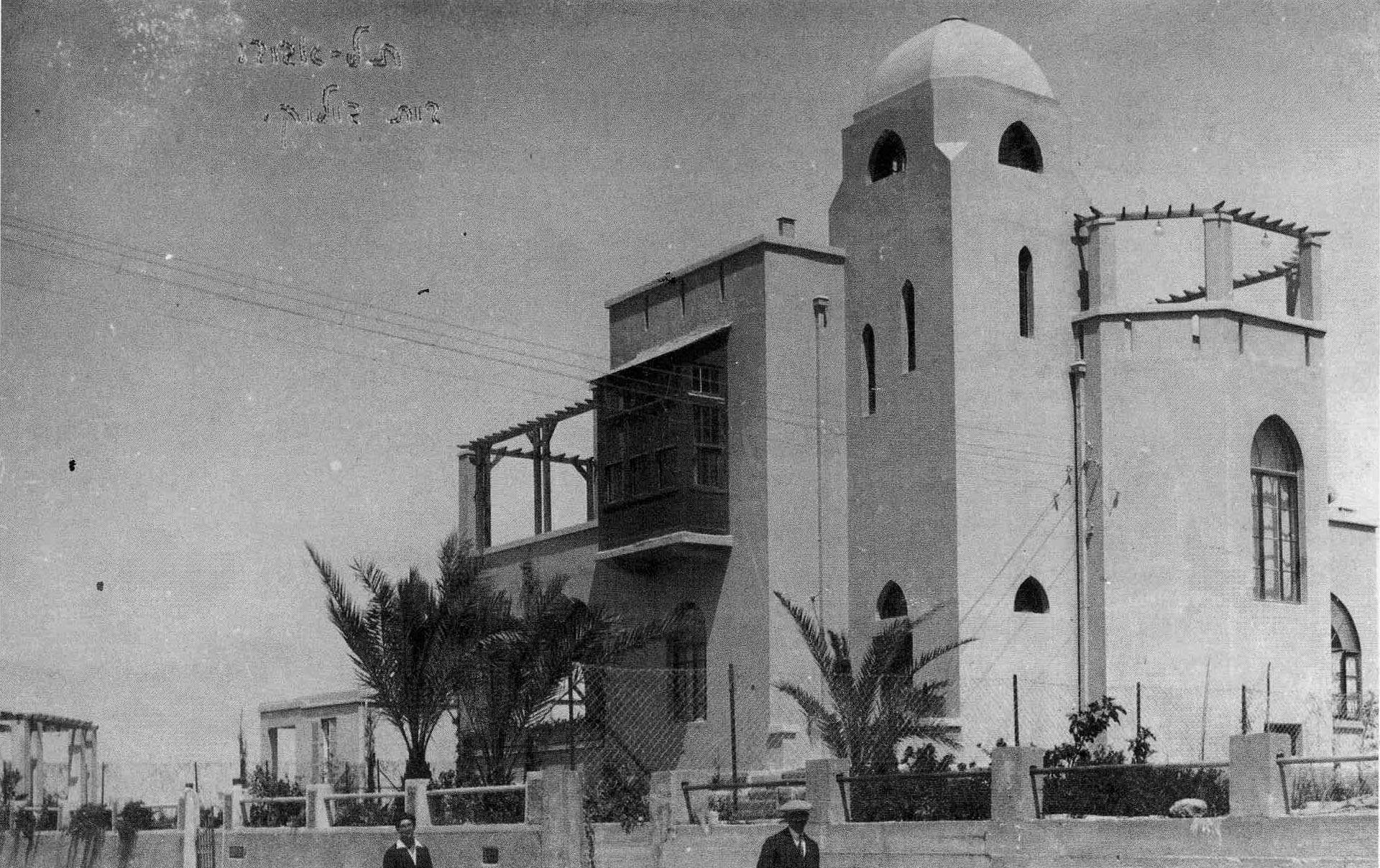
Bialik House, mid-1920s

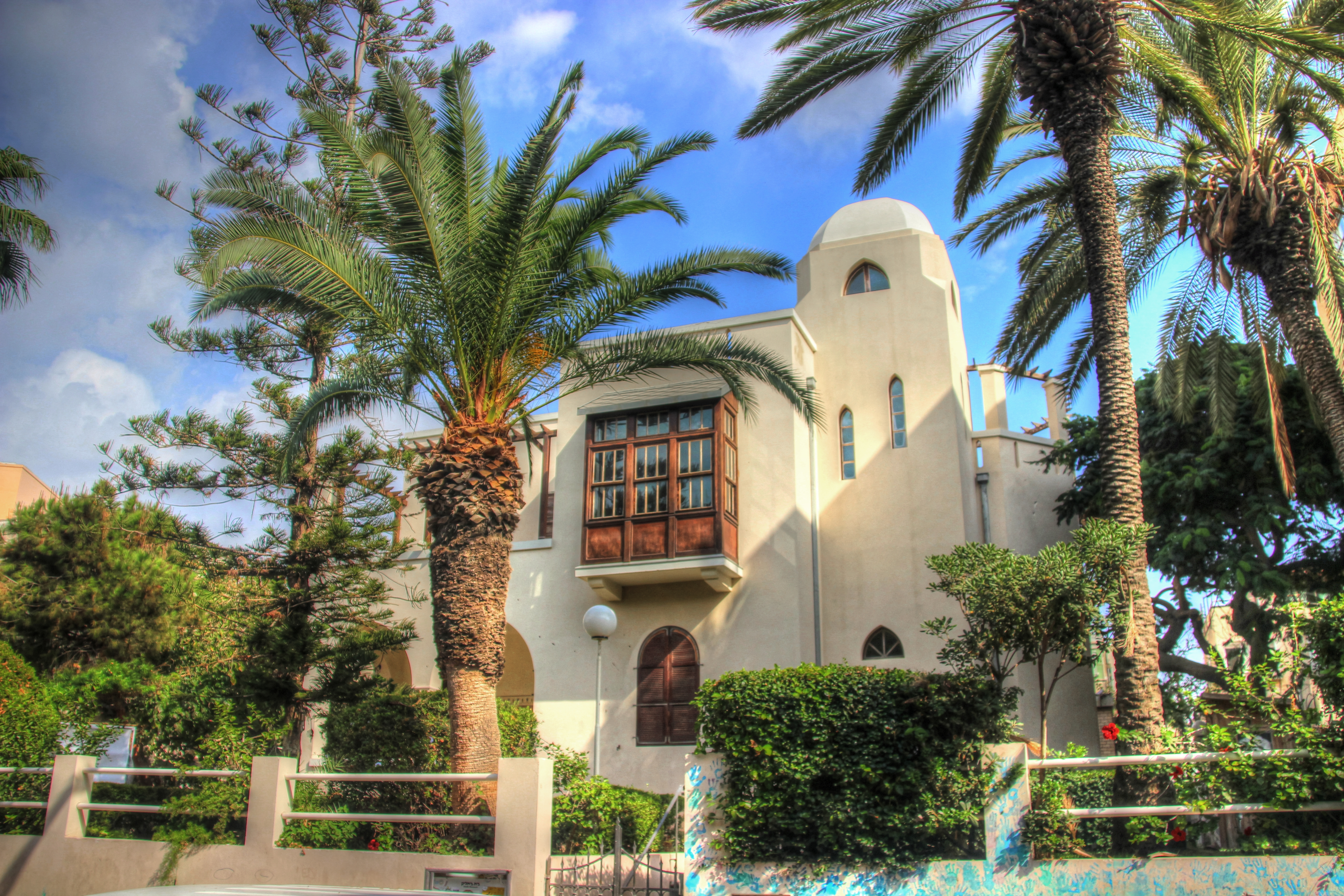
Bialik House, Tel Aviv, 2015

Bialik first visited Palestine in 1909. In 1924, he relocated with his publishing house Dvir to the township of Tel Aviv, devoting himself to cultural activities and public affairs and becoming a celebrated literary figure in the Yishuv. In 1927, Bialik was elected as head of the Hebrew Writers Association, a position he retained for the rest of his life. That year, he founded the Oneg Shabbat society of Tel Aviv, which sponsored communal gatherings on Shabbat afternoons to study Torah and sing. Samuel S. Bloom than financed the construction of the Ohel Shem hall, designed by Moshe Czerner, to house this society. It later became the home of the Israel Philharmonic Orchestra until its move in the 1950s to Heichal HaTarbut. Even though he was not an observant Jew, Bialik believed that public observance of Shabbat was essential to preserving the Jewish people. In response to criticism regarding his community activism, Bialik responded: "Show me the judge who can say which is preferable: a good poem or a good deed."

== Works and influence ==
Bialik wrote several different kinds of poetry: he is perhaps most famous for his long, nationalistic poems, which call for a reawakening of the Jewish people. Bialik had his own awakening even before writing those poems, arising out of the anger and shame he felt at the Jewish response to pogroms. In his poem In the City of Slaughter, Bialik excoriated the Jews of Kishinev who had allowed their persecutors to wreak their will without rising up to defend themselves. No less admired are his passionate poems on love, nature, the yearning for Zion and children's poems.

Bialik wrote most of his poems using Ashkenazi pronunciation. Today, modern Israeli Hebrew uses the Sephardi pronunciation (what Miryam Segal called the "new accent"), i.e., an amalgam of vowels and consonantal sounds from variety of sources. Consequently, Bialik's poems are rarely recited in the meter in which they were written, although according to Segal, the Ashkenazi (penultimate) stress pattern is still preserved.

Bialik contributed significantly to the revival of the Hebrew language, which, before his days was used almost exclusively for liturgy. The generation of Hebrew language poets who followed in Bialik's footsteps, including Jacob Steinberg and Jacob Fichman, are known as "the Bialik generation".

Bialik is honored as Israel's national poet. Bialik House, his former home at 22 Bialik Street in Tel Aviv, has been converted into a museum and a center for literary events. The Bialik Prize for literature was established by the municipality of Tel Aviv; Kiryat Bialik, a suburb of Haifa, and Givat Hen, a moshav bordering the city of Raanana, are named after him. The research body and publishing house, the Bialik Institute, is named after him. He is the only person to have two streets named after him in the same Israeli city – Bialik Street and Hen Boulevard in Tel Aviv. There is a Bialik Hebrew Day School in Toronto, ON, Canada; a Bialik High School in Montreal, QC, Canada, and a cross-communal Jewish Zionist school in Melbourne called Bialik College; in Caracas, Venezuela, the Jewish community school is named Herzl-Bialik and the Jewish school in Rosario, Argentina is named after him.

Bialik's poems have been translated into at least 30 languages, with some set to music as popular songs. These poems, and the songs based on them, have become an essential part of the education and culture of modern Israel and throughout the Jewish world.

== Death ==
Bialik died in Vienna, Austria, on July 4, 1934, from a sudden heart attack a week after undergoing a successful prostate operation. His burial in Tel Aviv had a large mourning procession followed from his home on the street named after him, to his final resting place.

== Gallery ==
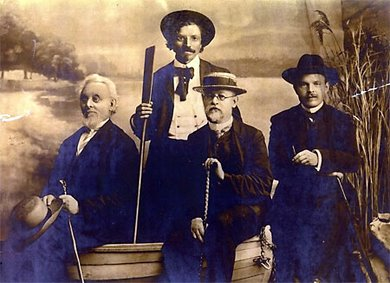
Mendele Mocher Sforim, Sholem Aleichem, Mordechai Ben Ami, Hayim Bialik in Odessa, 1910

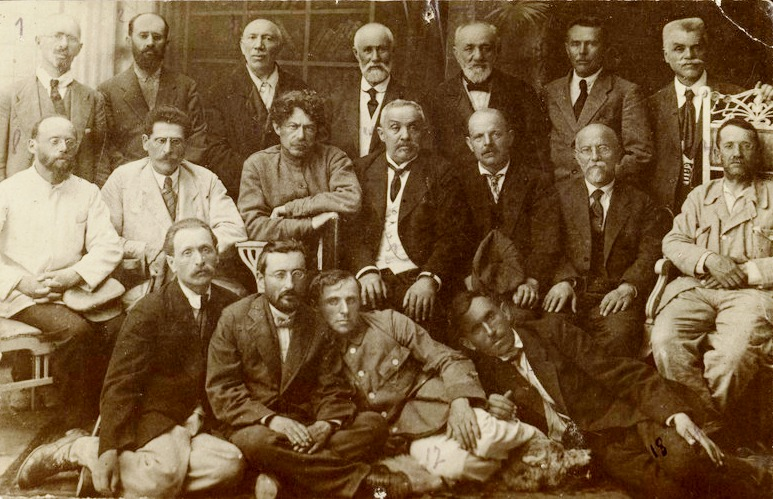
Hebrew writers in Odessa before leaving Soviet Russia, 1921

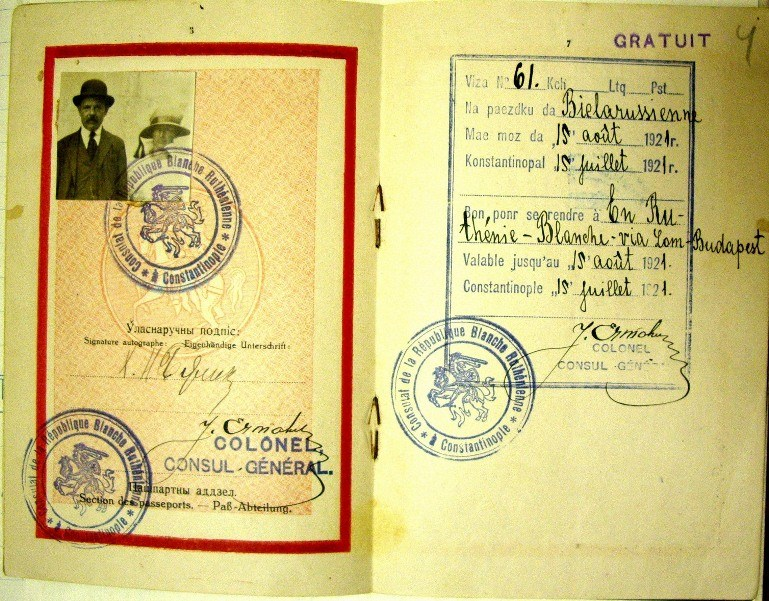
Passport of Belarusian People's Republic, 1921

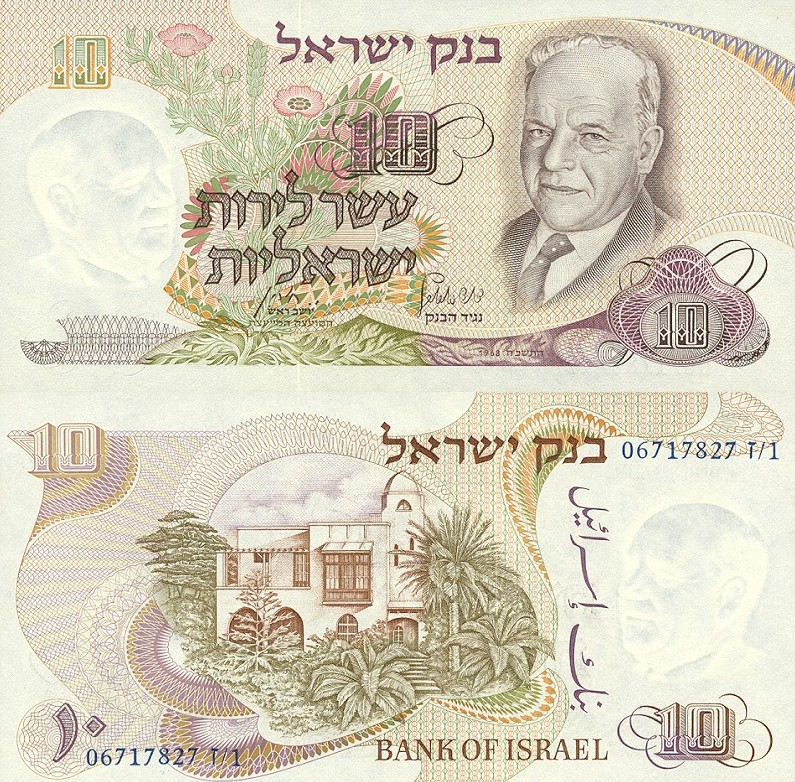
Israel 10 Lirot Obverse & Reverse, 1968

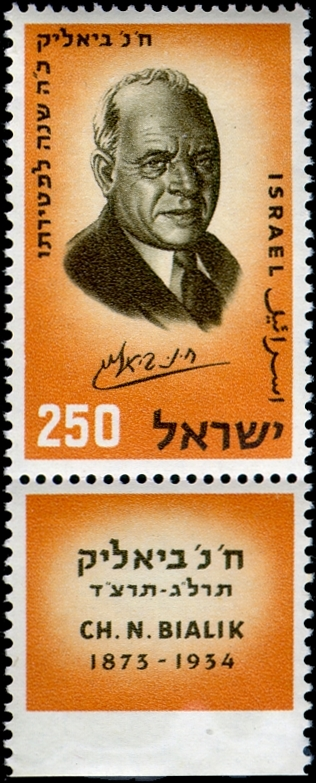
Israeli postal stamp, 1959

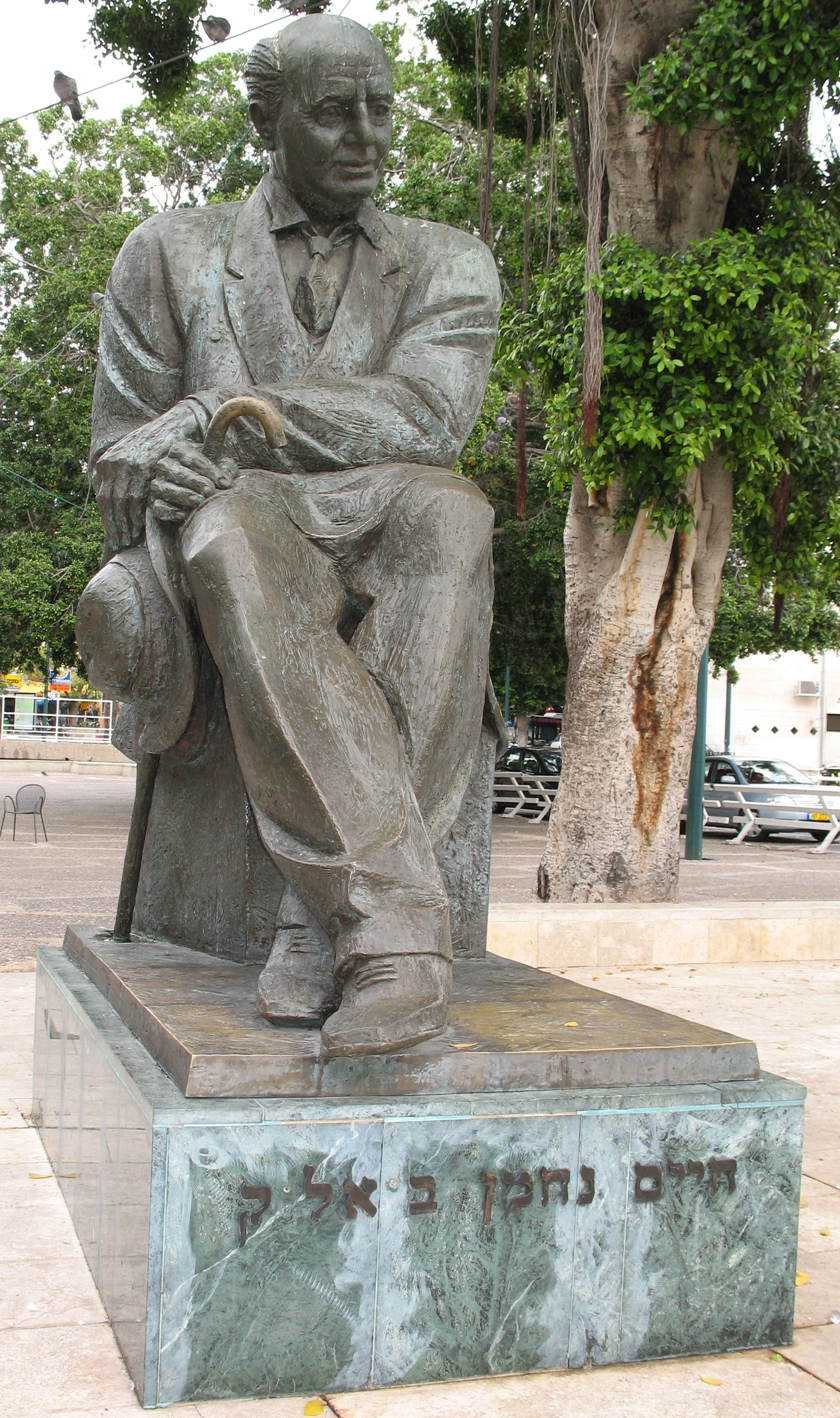
Statue in Ramat Gan, Israel

== Selected bibliography in English ==
- Selected Writings (poetry and prose) Hasefer, 1924; New York, New Palestine, 1926; Philadelphia, Jewish Publication Society, 1939; New York, Histadrut Ivrit of America, 1948; New York, Bloch, 1965; New York, Union of American Hebrew Congregations, 1972; Tel Aviv, Dvir and the Jerusalem Post, 1981; Columbus, Alpha, 1987
- The Short Friday Tel Aviv, Hashaot, 1944
- Knight of Onions and Knight of Garlic New York, Jordan, 1939
- Random Harvest – The Novellas of C. N. Bialik, Boulder, Colorado, Westview Press (Perseus Books), 1999
- The Modern Hebrew Poem Itself (2003), ISBN 0-8143-2485-1
- Songs from Bialik: Selected Poems of Hayim Nahman Bialik, Syracuse, Syracuse University Press, 2000
- Selected Poems: Bilingual Edition, (translated by Ruth Nevo), Jerusalem: Dvir, 1981.
